= Holy Cross Crusaders =

Athletic teams representing the College of the Holy Cross

- University: College of the Holy Cross
- Nickname: Crusaders
- NCAA: Division I (FCS)
- Conference: Patriot League (primary); Atlantic Hockey America (men's ice hockey); Hockey East (women's ice hockey); EARC (rowing)
- Athletic director: Kit Hughes
- Location: Worcester, Massachusetts
- Varsity teams: 27
- Football stadium: Fitton Field
- Basketball arena: Hart Recreation Center
- Baseball stadium: Hanover Insurance Park at Fitton Field
- Softball stadium: Freshman Field
- Soccer stadium: Linda Johnson Smith Soccer Stadium
- Volleyball arena: Hart Recreation Center
- Colors: Royal purple
- Website: goholycross.com

The Holy Cross Crusaders are the athletic teams representing the College of the Holy Cross. They compete in NCAA Division I, primarily as members of the Patriot League. In ice hockey, a sport not sponsored by the Patriot League for either sex, the Crusaders are members of two other leagues, with men competing in the Atlantic Hockey Association and women in Hockey East. The men's rowing team is part of the Eastern Association of Rowing Colleges. Of its 27 varsity teams, Holy Cross supports 13 men's and 14 women's sports, giving Holy Cross the largest ratio of teams-per-enrollment in the country. Holy Cross's athletic teams for both men and women are known as the Crusaders.

Holy Cross is a founding member of the Patriot League, with one-quarter of its student body participating in its varsity athletic programs. Principal facilities include Fitton Field for football (capacity: 23,500) and Hanover Insurance Park at Fitton Field for baseball (3,000), the Hart Center at the Luth Athletic Complex for basketball (3,600) and ice hockey (1,400), the Linda Johnson Smith Soccer Stadium (1,320), and the Smith Wellness Center, located inside the Luth Athletic Complex.

The college is one of nine schools to have won an NCAA championship in both baseball (1952) and basketball (1947).

== Sports ==
Men's sports	Women's sports
Baseball	Basketball
Basketball	Cross country
Cross country	Field hockey
Football	Golf
Golf	Ice hockey
Ice hockey	Lacrosse
Lacrosse	Rowing
Rowing	Soccer
Soccer	Softball
Swimming & diving	Swimming & diving
Tennis	Tennis
Track & field^{1}	Track & field^{1}
	Volleyball
^{1} – includes both indoor and outdoor.|

=== Baseball ===
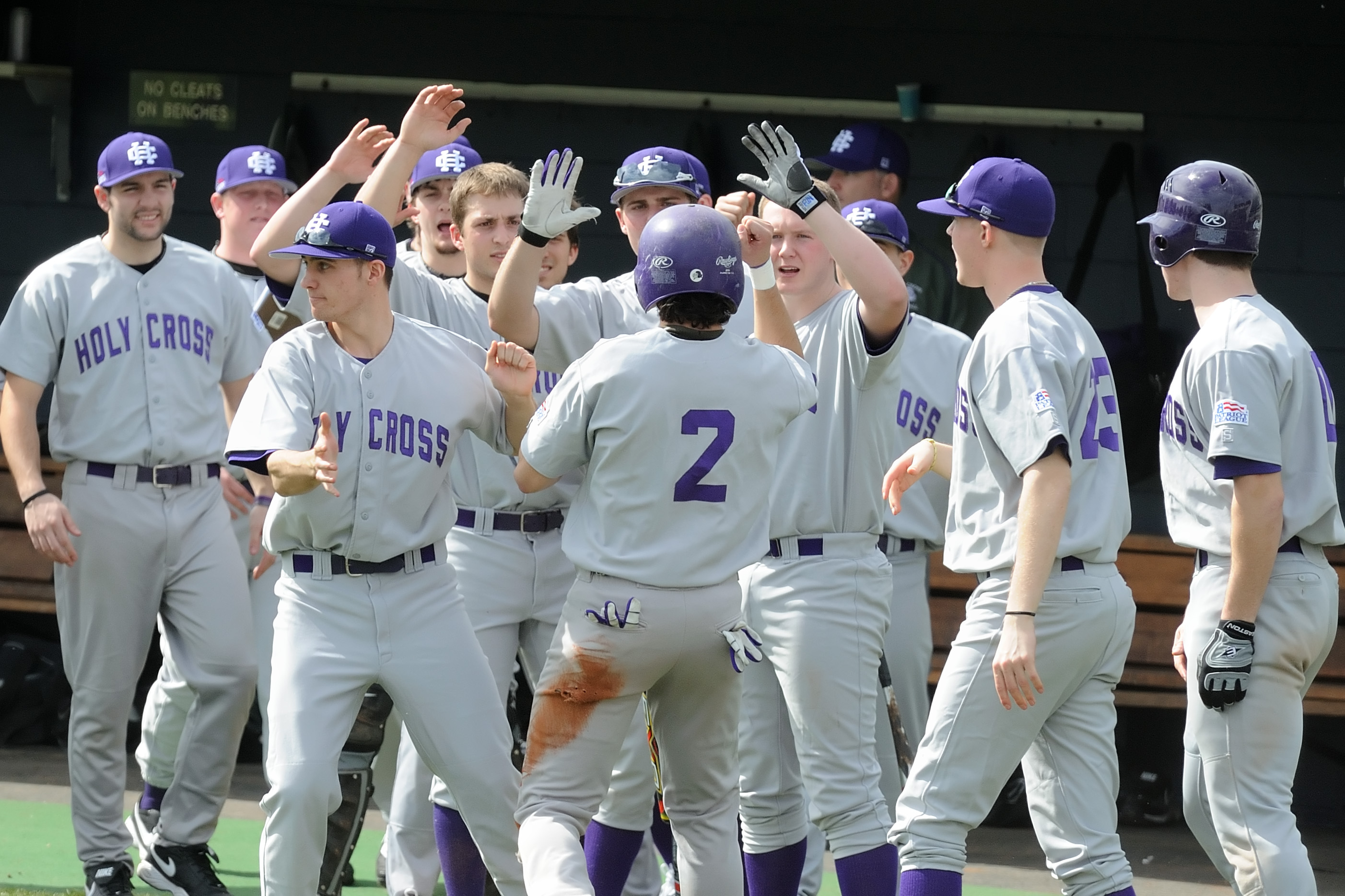
Crusaders baseball players celebrating a run in 2009

The Holy Cross baseball team won the NCAA National Championship in 1952 and remains the only team from the northeastern part of the United States to have won the College World Series. The Crusaders also reached the College World Series in 1958, 1962, and 1963. In the last two of these seasons, the team featured pitcher Dick Joyce, who briefly made the major leagues, and third baseman John Peterman, who after a short minor-league career went on to become a successful entrepreneur who was parodied on Seinfeld. The Crusaders won their first Patriot League Baseball Tournament title in 2017 and returned to the NCAA Tournament for the first time since 1978 where it defeated No. 25 Nebraska.

=== Basketball ===
==== Men's basketball ====
The Holy Cross men's basketball team has won two national tournament championships having won the NCAA Tournament in 1947 and the National Invitation Tournament in 1954 at a time when the NIT was considered to be equal to if not more prestigious than the NCAA Tournament. The team also has reached the Final Four in 1948 and the Elite Eight in 1950 and 1953. In 2016, the team captured its first win in an NCAA Tournament game since the 1953 season. Notable former players include Boston Celtics legends and Naismith Memorial Basketball Hall of Fame inductees Bob Cousy and Tom Heinsohn.

==== Women's basketball ====
The Holy Cross women's basketball team has also made several appearances in the postseason including 12 trips to the NCAA tournament as well as one appearance in both the Women's National Invitation Tournament and the Women's Basketball Invitational. They are 1–12 in the NCAA Tournament with the lone win coming in 1991 as an upset over 6th seeded Maryland. This is the only victory in the NCAA Tournament for any team from the Patriot League. Six-time Patriot League Coach of the Year Bill Gibbons recorded his 500th win early in the 2011–2012 campaign.

=== Football ===
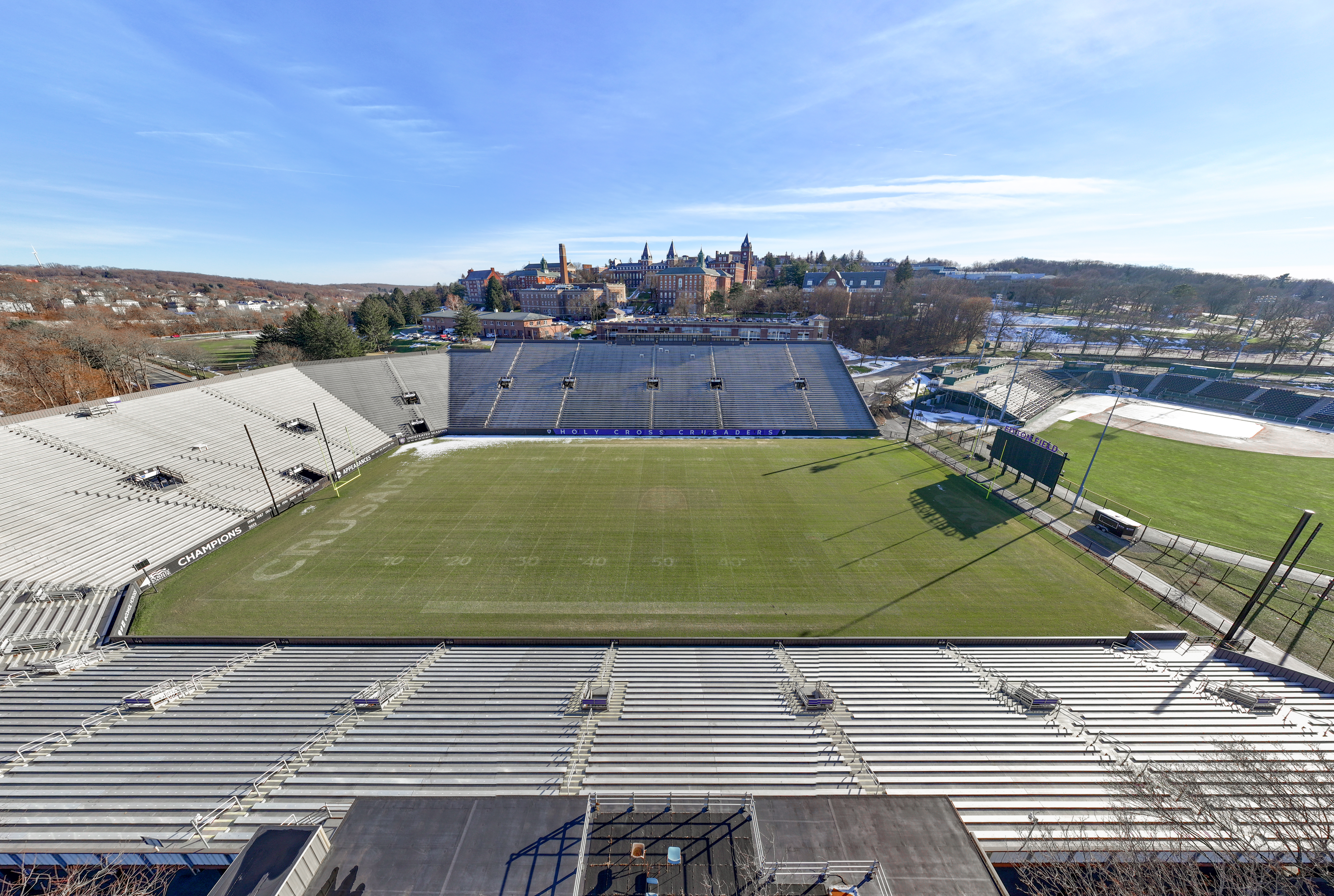
Fitton Field, home to Holy Cross football

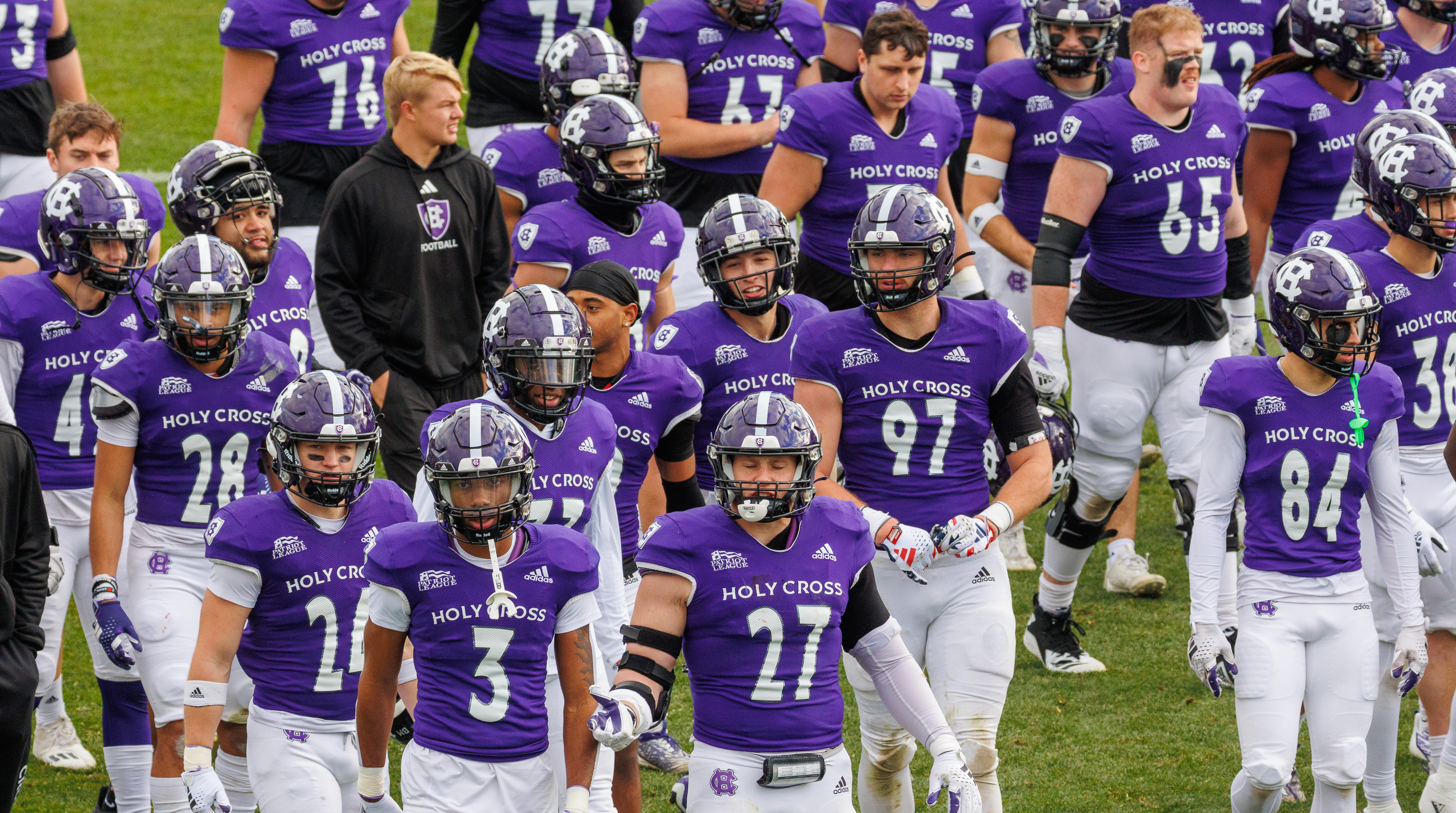
Players of Holy Cross during a game in 2023

The Holy Cross football team played in the 1946 Orange Bowl. The team has since made the FCS postseason in 1983, 2009, 2019, 2020, 2021 and 2022. In 1987, the team went undefeated and finished first in the national polls despite the Patriot League not allowing its teams to participate in the NCAA playoffs.

Notable former players include Bill Osmanski who went on to win four NFL Championships with the Chicago Bears, Gill Fenerty a former NFL and Holy Cross star, and two-time Heisman Trophy finalist Gordie Lockbaum.

=== Ice hockey ===
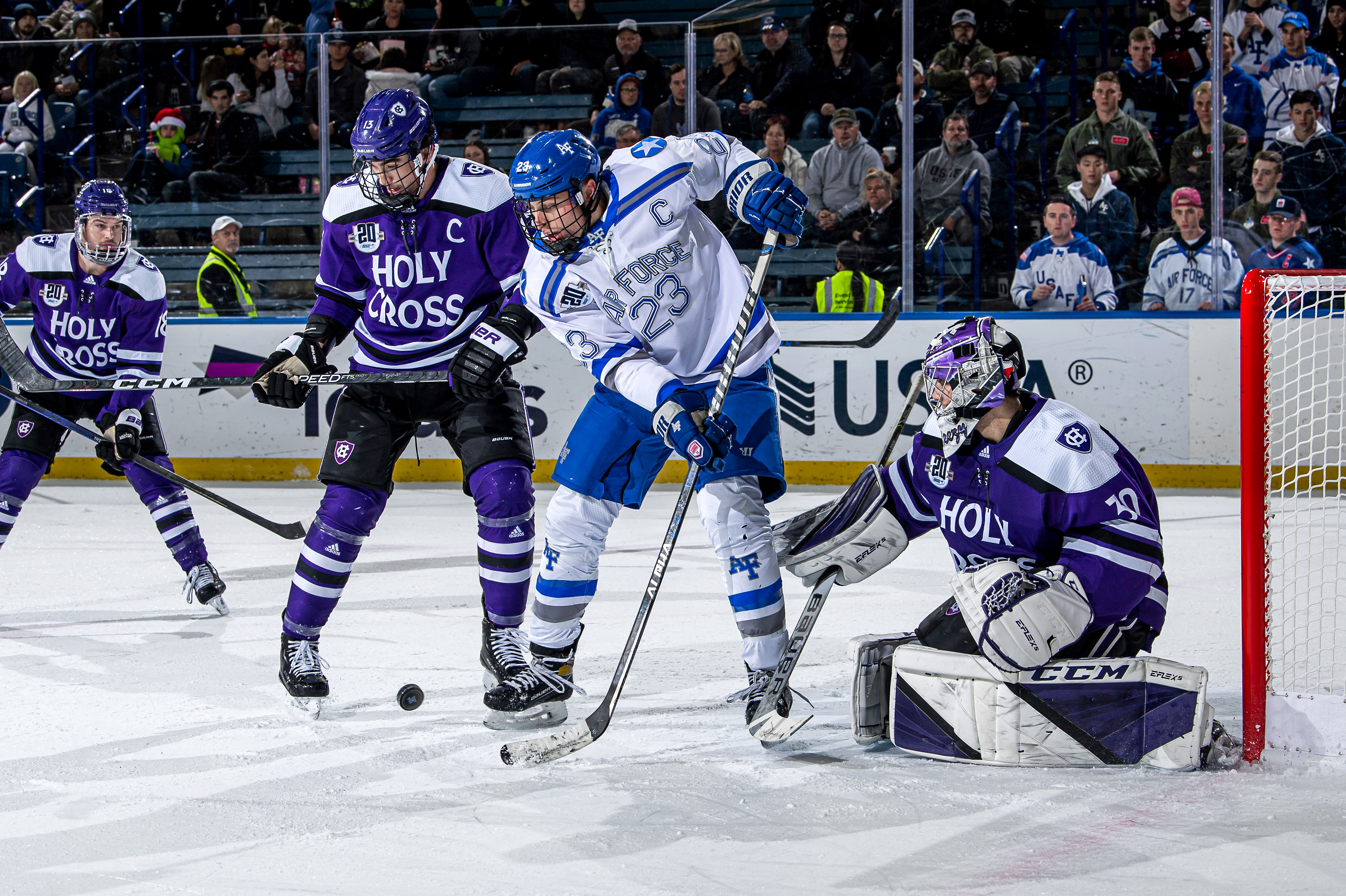
The Holy Cross men's ice hockey team plays against Air Force in 2022

On March 24, 2006, the Holy Cross men's hockey team made history by defeating the Golden Gophers of the University of Minnesota in the first round of the 2006 NCAA Division I Men's Ice Hockey Tournament by the score of 4–3, in overtime. Coined as one of the biggest upsets in NCAA ice hockey history, never since the NCAA tourney expanded to sixteen teams had a sixteen seed beat a number one seed until again in 2015 when the 16th seeded RIT Tigers defeated the first seeded Minnesota State Mavericks by a score of 2–1. In its history, the Holy Cross ice hockey program has seen two NCAA appearances, and has won the Atlantic Hockey and MAAC three times (1999, 2004, 2006). The men's ice hockey program competes in the Atlantic Hockey Association.

The women's ice hockey team competed in the Division III New England Hockey Conference from its creation in 2015–16 until moving to Division I play in 2017. This team competed as a Division I independent during the 2017–18 season as part of a scheduling agreement known as the New England Women's Hockey Alliance before joining Hockey East for the 2018–19 season.

=== Other sports ===
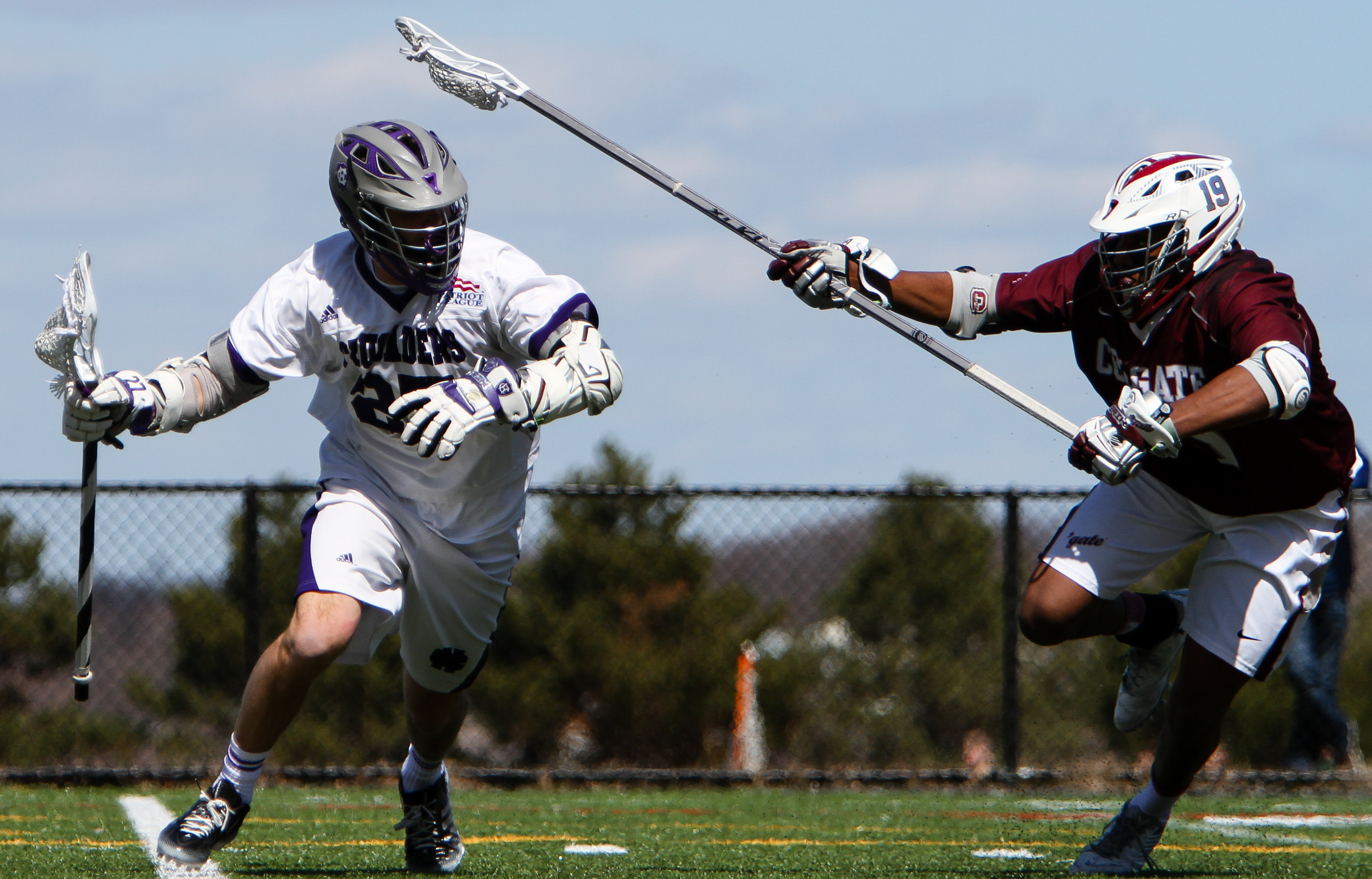
Holy Cross v Colgate lacrosse match in 2015

Holy Cross has a rich history of success with its track & field program. In 1917, Andrew Kelly set the world record in the 300 yard dash. Joe Tierney won the IC4A 440 yard title in 1925, and James Quinn won the IC4A 100 yard in 1928 before going on to win an Olympic gold medal in the 4 × 100 m relay. Leo Larrivee is the only other Crusader to earn an Olympic medal when his 3000-metre team finished with the bronze in the 1924 Olympic Games. In the early 1960s, Charlie Buchta and Kevin Kilgallen were prominent Crusaders on the national scene.

The Holy Cross golf team has also produced several professional golfers including Willie Turnesa who won two US Amateur titles (1938, 1948) and a British Amateur (1947), and Paul Harney who, after earning a medal as the stroke play champion at the 1952 NCAA Golf Championship, won six PGA Tour events and was inducted into the PGA of America Hall of Fame.

In recent years, the soccer programs made their first NCAA Tournament appearances with the women appearing in 2000 and the men appearing in 2002. In 2006 and 2007, the women's lacrosse team made its first NCAA Tournament appearances, defeating LeMoyne in the NCAA play-in game before falling to Duke in 2006, and losing to Northwestern in 2007.

In addition, the Holy Cross rowing teams, both men and women, have enjoyed success over the years. Key highlights include the women's team winning several New England championships and the 2002 ECAC National Invitational, and the men's varsity eight finishing ranked within the national top 20 in 2005, 2006, 2013, and 2015. In 2016, the men's varsity four finished fourth at the Intercollegiate Rowing Association National Championship. The women's team competes in the Patriot League and also holds membership in the Eastern College Athletic Conference. As the NCAA and Patriot League do not sponsor men's rowing, the men's team was granted an acceptance into the Eastern Association of Rowing Colleges (EARC), which is composed of the traditional Ivy League schools plus other select universities.

== Academics ==
Holy Cross student-athletes are among the most academically successful in the nation. In 2016, the Crusaders’ overall Graduation Success Rate of 97 percent for all student-athletes tied for the 17th best mark in the country out of 351 Division I schools. That marked the 10th straight year in which Holy Cross posted a Graduation Success Rate of at least 97 percent.

Also in 2016, 14 Holy Cross varsity athletic teams received Division I Academic Progress Rate (APR) public recognition awards from the NCAA. These teams posted multi-year APR scores in the top 10 percent of all squads in their respective sports. The 14 total teams earning public recognition awards put Holy Cross in the top 10 among all Division I athletic programs. The Crusaders finished tied for eighth in the nation out of 356 schools, placing them in the top three percent of all of Division I.

== Championships ==
=== NCAA Team Championships ===
Holy Cross has won two NCAA team national championships:

- Men's (2)
  - Baseball (1): 1952
  - Basketball (1): 1947

=== Other national team championships ===
Holy Cross also claims two national championships not recognized by the NCAA:

- Men's (2)
  - Basketball (1): 1954*
  - Football (1): 1987**

* - The NIT was widely considered equally prestigious to the NCAA Tournament at the time, particularly because it was played at the high-profile Madison Square Garden.

** – The Patriot League did not allow its members to participate in the I-AA football playoffs during its early years, but the undefeated Crusaders finished first in the national polls and The Sporting News declared them National Champions.

=== Conference Championships ===
Holy Cross has won more than 50 regular season and/or postseason conference championships throughout its Division I history. The majority of these have come in the Patriot League, where it currently competes for most sports.

- Men's
  - Baseball - Regular Season: 1986, 2013; Tournament: 2017
  - Basketball – Regular Season: 1990, 1994, 2001, 2003, 2005, 2007; Tournament: 1977, 1980, 1993, 2001, 2002, 2003, 2007, 2016
  - Football – 1986, 1987, 1989, 1990, 1991, 2009, 2019, 2020, 2021, 2022
  - Ice Hockey – Regular Season: 2004, 2006; Tournament: 1999, 2004, 2006
  - Soccer – Regular Season: 1995, 1999, 2001, 2002, 2007; Tournament: 2002
- Women's
  - Basketball – Regular Season: 1984, 1991, 1993, 1995, 1997, 1998, 1999, 2000, 2001, 2002, 2003, 2005, 2022; Tournament – 1985, 1989, 1991, 1993, 1995, 1996, 1998, 1999, 2000, 2001, 2003, 2005, 2007, 2023
  - Cross Country – 1983, 1984, 1985
  - Field Hockey – Regular Season: 1998, 2000, 2001; Tournament: 1997, 1998, 2000
  - Lacrosse – Regular Season: 2006, 2007; Tournament: 2006, 2007
  - Soccer – Tournament: 2000
  - Softball – Regular Season: 1998; Tournament: 1998
  - Tennis – 1987, 1989

== Traditions ==
=== "Crusader" moniker and mascot ===
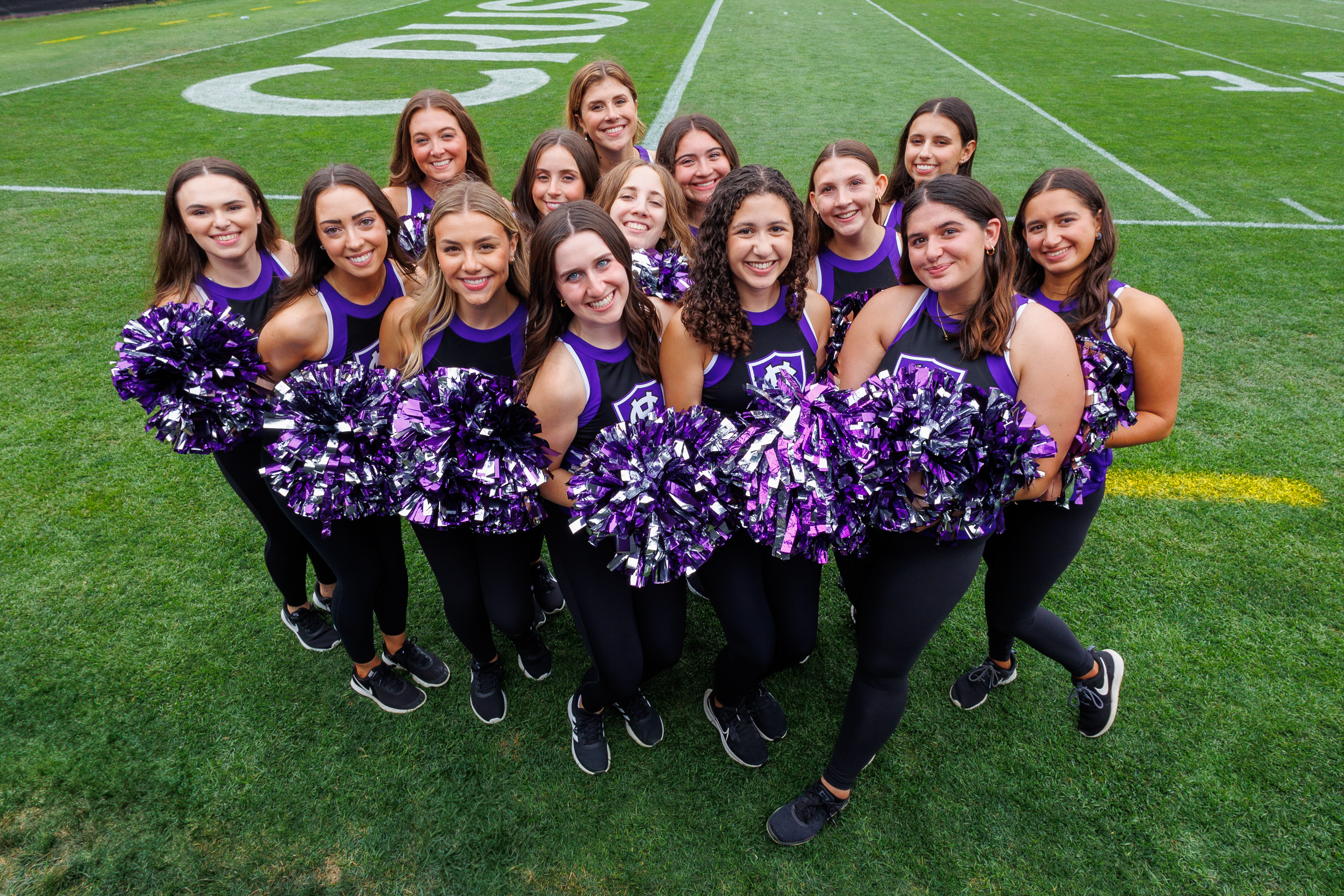
Cheer Team in September 2024

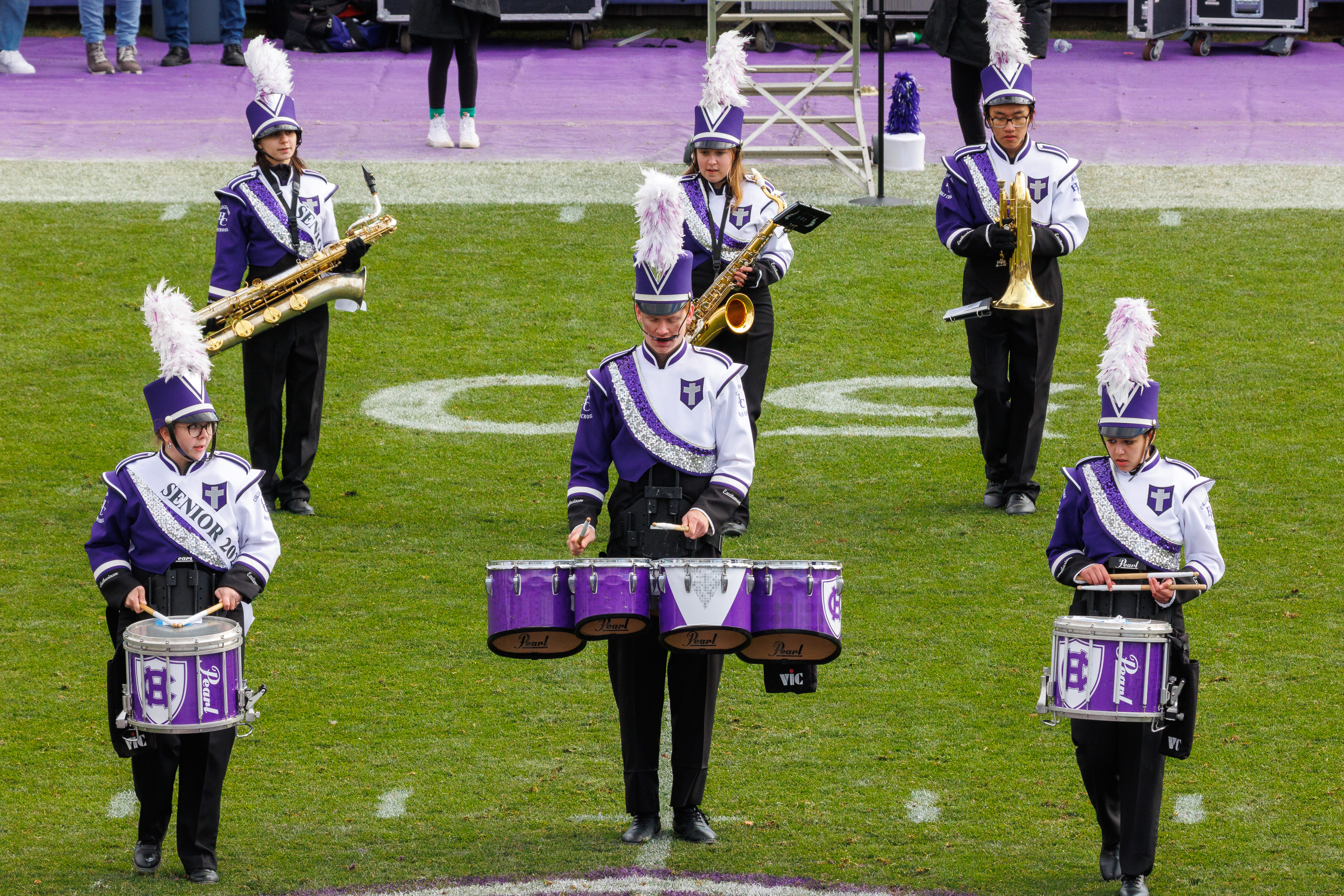
Holy Cross Goodtime Marching Band, 2023

It is reported that the name "Crusader" was first associated with Holy Cross in 1884 at an alumni banquet in Boston, where an engraved Crusader mounted on an armored horse appeared at the head of the menu.

The name was rediscovered by Stanley Woodward, a sports reporter for the Boston Herald, when he used the term "Crusader" to describe the Holy Cross baseball team in a story written in 1925. The name appealed to the Holy Cross student body, which held a vote later in that year to decide whether this cognomen or one of the other two currently in use – "Chiefs" and "Sagamores"- would be adopted. On October 6, 1925, The Tomahawk, an earlier name of the student newspaper, reported that the results of the ballot were: Crusaders 143, Chiefs 17, Sagamores 7.

Owing to the post-9/11 controversy over the “Crusaders” nickname, only Holy Cross maintains the Crusaders nickname at the NCAA Division I level.

In 2018, college administrators reviewed the appropriateness of the school's use of the "Holy Cross Crusader" moniker and mascot. The school decided to retain the Crusader name but discontinue the use of a costumed knight mascot. Instead, the school adopted an interlocking "HC" on a purple shield to serve as its main logo.

=== School spirit ===
Football games and other athletic events are supported by the Holy Cross Goodtime Marching Band and the Holy Cross Cheer Team.

=== School colors ===
The school color is royal purple. There are two theories of how Holy Cross chose purple as its official color. One suggests it was derived from the royal purple used by Emperor Constantine the Great (born about 275 A.D., died in 337 AD) as displayed on his labarum (military standard) and on those of later Christian emperors of Rome.

The other version is attributed to Walter J. Connors, an 1887 graduate, and was printed in the October 1940 issue of the Alumnus. According to the account, there was a disagreement during the 1870s between Holy Cross students from Massachusetts and Connecticut concerning the schools' baseball uniform colors. Those from Massachusetts purportedly favored the crimson of Harvard, while those from Connecticut favored the deep blue of Yale. Legend has it that a fellow student with a sense of diplomacy resolved the dispute in the chemistry lab, where he mixed copper sulphate (blue) with iron oxide (red) to produce the color of deep purple.

== Boston College rivalry ==
Historically, Holy Cross' major rival has been the Eagles of Boston College, especially in football. Boston College does not share this view as far as Holy Cross being a "rival". In 1896, Holy Cross and Boston College played the first football game between the two schools.

To accommodate larger crowds, the Holy Cross game was routinely held at larger venues off campus, with the 1916 matchup taking place at the newly constructed Fenway Park. A record 54,000 attended the 1922 game at Braves Field, home of the Boston Braves baseball team. On November 28, 1942, Holy Cross beat BC in a huge upset by a score of 55–12, a result that proved fortunate for the losing Eagles. The BC team had booked their victory party for a popular Boston nightclub, but canceled after the upset loss. As a result, the Eagles were not among the nearly 500 who died or the hundreds more who were injured when the nightclub caught fire that night.

By the late 1970s the Holy Cross game had become more of a tradition than a rivalry, as Holy Cross football began to cease to be a major power. By 1980, the game was no longer part of the student ticket package, and was mostly attended by alumni. In 1986 Holy Cross changed the direction of its football program, joining the Division I-AA Patriot League, and terminated the series. BC had won 17 of the last 20 games.

The last basketball game between the two schools was played on January 17, 2006, a 63–53 win for Boston College at Worcester's DCU Center. Later that year, BC's athletic director, Gene DeFilippo, caused a minor controversy when he announced that the school would not schedule any more basketball games against Holy Cross, claiming that it was not beneficial for BC.

The two schools renewed their rivalry in basketball on November 22, 2010, as part of the Jesuit Basketball Spotlight, a national effort to bring attention to Jesuit education. In a game held at BC's Conte Forum, Boston College posted a 69–56 victory, the Eagles' 16th in their last 17 games against Holy Cross. On November 18, 2011, the Crusaders defeated the Eagles 86–64 in Worcester.

== Fans ==
The Holy Cross Crusaders have a group of loyal fans, sometimes called the "Mount St. James Faithful" or the "Hart Center Faithful", the nickname coming from the athletic stadium at The College of the Holy Cross.
