= List of Columbia Lions football seasons =

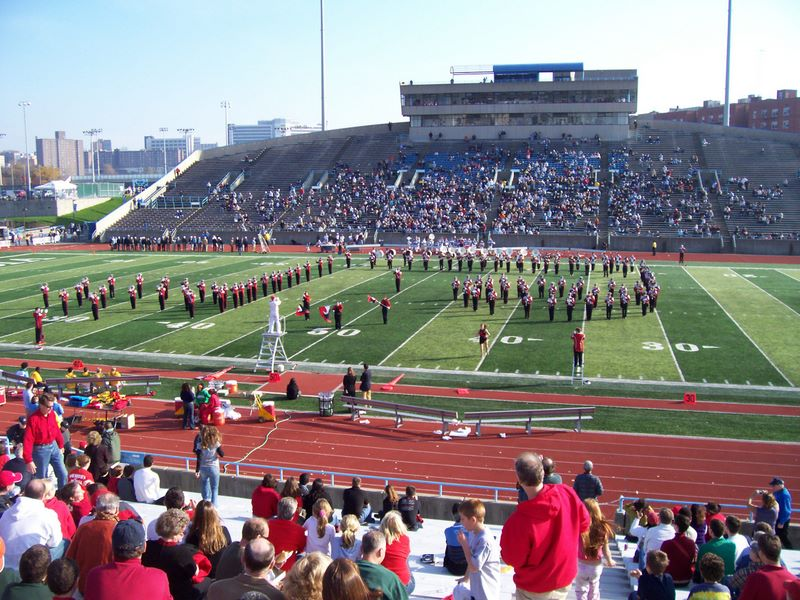
Robert K. Kraft Field at Lawrence A. Wien Stadium, where the Columbia Lions have played their home games from 1923 to 1982 and since 1984.

This is a list of seasons completed by the Columbia Lions football team of the National Collegiate Athletic Association (NCAA) Division I Football Championship Subdivision (FCS). Since the team's 1870 creation, Columbia has played more than 1,100 football games, with an all-time record of 421–708–43. Columbia originally competed as a football independent before joining the Ivy League as a founding member in 1956.

== Seasons ==
Year	Coach	Overall	Conference	Standing	Bowl/playoffs	Coaches^{#}	AP^{°}
Independent (1870–1891)
1870	No coach	0–1					
1871	No team						
1872	No coach	1–2–1					
1873	No coach	2–1					
1874	No coach	1–5					
1875	No coach	4–1–1					
1876	No coach	1–3					
1877	No coach	2–3					
1878	No coach	0–0–1					
1879	No coach	0–3–2					
1880	No coach	1–2					
1881	No coach	3–3–1					
1882	No coach	0–5					
1883	No coach	1–3					
1884	No coach	1–1					
1885–88	No team						
1889	No coach	2–7–2					
1890	No coach	1–6–1					
1891	No coach	1–5					
1892–98	No team						
George Sanford (Independent) (1899–1901)
1899	George Sanford	9–3					
1900	George Sanford	7–3–1					
1901	George Sanford	8–5					
Bill Morley (Independent) (1902–1905)
1902	Bill Morley	6–4–1					
1903	Bill Morley	9–1					
1904	Bill Morley	7–3					
1905	Bill Morley	4–3–2					
1906–14	No team						
T. Nelson Metcalf (Independent) (1915–1917)
1915	T. Nelson Metcalf	5–0					
1916	T. Nelson Metcalf	1–5–2					
1917	T. Nelson Metcalf	2–4					
Fred Dawson (Independent) (1918–1919)
1918	Fred Dawson	5–1					
1919	Fred Dawson	2–4–3					
Frank O’Neill (Independent) (1920–1922)
1920	Frank O’Neill	4–4					
1921	Frank O’Neill	2–6					
1922	Frank O’Neill	5–4					
Percy Haughton (Independent) (1923–1924)
1923	Percy Haughton	4–4–1					
1924	Haughton & Withington	5–3–1					
Charles F. Crowley (Independent) (1925–1929)
1925	Charles F. Crowley	6–3–1					
1926	Charles F. Crowley	6–3					
1927	Charles F. Crowley	5–2–2					
1928	Charles F. Crowley	5–3–1					
1929	Charles F. Crowley	4–5					
Lou Little (Independent) (1930–1955)
1930	Lou Little	5–4					
1931	Lou Little	7–1–1					
1932	Lou Little	7–1–1					
1933	Lou Little	8–1			W Rose		
1934	Lou Little	7–1					
1935	Lou Little	4–4–1					
1936	Lou Little	5–3					
1937	Lou Little	2–5–2					
1938	Lou Little	3–6					
1939	Lou Little	2–4–2					
1940	Lou Little	5–2–2					
1941	Lou Little	3–5					
1942	Lou Little	3–6					
1943	Lou Little	0–8					
1944	Lou Little	2–6					
1945	Lou Little	8–1					20
1946	Lou Little	6–3					
1947	Lou Little	7–2					20
1948	Lou Little	4–5					
1949	Lou Little	2–7					
1950	Lou Little	4–5					
1951	Lou Little	5–3					
1952	Lou Little	2–6–1					
1953	Lou Little	4–5					
1954	Lou Little	1–8					
1955	Lou Little	1–8					
Lou Little (Ivy League) (1956)
1956	Lou Little	3–6	2–5	T–6th			
Aldo Donelli (Ivy League) (1957–1967)
1957	Aldo Donelli	1–8	1–6	8th			
1958	Aldo Donelli	1–8	1–6	7th			
1959	Aldo Donelli	2–7	1–6	8th			
1960	Aldo Donelli	3–6	3–4	5th			
1961	Aldo Donelli	6–3	6–1	T–1st			
1962	Aldo Donelli	5–4	4–3	T–3rd			
1963	Aldo Donelli	4–4–1	2–4–1	6th			
1964	Aldo Donelli	2–6–1	1–5–1	7th			
1965	Aldo Donelli	2–7	1–6	T–7th			
1966	Aldo Donelli	2–7	2–5	6th			
1967	Aldo Donelli	2–7	0–7	8th			
Frank Navarro (Ivy League) (1968–1973)
1968	Frank Navarro	2–7	2–5	6th			
1969	Frank Navarro	1–8	1–6	T–7th			
1970	Frank Navarro	3–6	1–6	T–7th			
1971	Frank Navarro	6–3	5–2	3rd			
1972	Frank Navarro	3–5–1	2–4–1	T–6th			
1973	Frank Navarro	1–7–1	1–6	7th			
William V. Campbell (Ivy League) (1974–1979)
1974	William V. Campbell	1–8	0–7	8th			
1975	William V. Campbell	2–7	2–5	T–6th			
1976	William V. Campbell	3–6	2–5	T–5th			
1977	William V. Campbell	2–7	1–6	T–7th			
1978	William V. Campbell	3–5–1	2–4–1	T–5th			
1979	William V. Campbell	1–8	1–6	7th			
Bob Naso (Ivy League) (1980–1984)
1980	Bob Naso	1–9	0–7	8th			
1981	Bob Naso	1–9	1–6	T–7th			
1982	Bob Naso	1–9	1–6	8th			
1983	Bob Naso	1–7–2	1–5–1	7th			
1984	Bob Naso	0–9	0–7	8th			
James W. Garrett (Ivy League) (1985)
1985	James W. Garrett	0–10	0–7	8th			
Larry McElreavy (Ivy League) (1986–1988)
1986	Larry McElreavy	0–10	0–7	8th			
1987	Larry McElreavy	0–10	0–7	8th			
1988	Larry McElreavy	2–8	2–5	T–6th			
Ray Tellier (Ivy League) (1989–2002)
1989	Ray Tellier	1–9	1–6	8th			
1990	Ray Tellier	1–9	1–6	8th			
1991	Ray Tellier	1–9	1–6	T–7th			
1992	Ray Tellier	3–7	2–5	T–6th			
1993	Ray Tellier	2–8	1–6	T–7th			
1994	Ray Tellier	5–4–1	3–4	T–4th			
1995	Ray Tellier	3–6–1	3–4	5th			
1996	Ray Tellier	8–2	5–2	2nd			
1997	Ray Tellier	3–7 (Note: Penn forfeited a conference win over Columbia due to the use of ineligible players, leading to an official record of 4–6 (3–4).)	2–5	T–6th			
1998	Ray Tellier	4–6	3–4	T–5th			
1999	Ray Tellier	3–7	1–6	T–7th			
2000	Ray Tellier	3–7	1–6	T–6th			
2001	Ray Tellier	3–7	3–4	T–4th			
2002	Ray Tellier	1–9	0–7	8th			
Bob Shoop (Ivy League) (2003–2005)
2003	Bob Shoop	4–6	3–4	6th			
2004	Bob Shoop	1–9	1–6	T–7th			
2005	Bob Shoop	2–8	0–7	8th			
Norries Wilson (Ivy League) (2006–2011)
2006	Norries Wilson	5–5	2–5	T–6th			
2007	Norries Wilson	1–9	0–7	8th			
2008	Norries Wilson	2–8	2–5	T–6th			
2009	Norries Wilson	4–6	3–4	T–4th			
2010	Norries Wilson	4–6	2–5	6th			
2011	Norries Wilson	1–9	1–6	T–7th			
Pete Mangurian (Ivy League) (2012–2014)
2012	Pete Mangurian	3–7	2–5	T–6th			
2013	Pete Mangurian	0–10	0–7	8th			
2014	Pete Mangurian	0–10	0–7	8th			
Al Bagnoli (Ivy League) (2015–2022)
2015	Al Bagnoli	2–8	1–6	T–7th			
2016	Al Bagnoli	3–7	2–5	T–6th			
2017	Al Bagnoli	8–2	5–2	T–2nd			
2018	Al Bagnoli	6–4	3–4	T–4th			
2019	Al Bagnoli	3–7	2–5	T–6th			
2020	No team (Note: Columbia did not compete during the 2020 season as a result of the COVID-19 pandemic and the subsequent cancellation of the Ivy League season.)						
2021	Al Bagnoli	7–3	4–3	T–4th			
2022	Al Bagnoli	6–4	3–4	5th			
Mark Fabish (Ivy League) (2023)
2023	Mark Fabish (Note: Offensive coordinator Mark Fabish was elevated to interim head coach after the retirement of Al Bagnoli in August.)	3–7	1–6	8th			
Jon Poppe (Ivy League) (2024–present)
2024	Jon Poppe	7–3	5–2	T–1st			
2025	Jon Poppe	2–8	1–6	8th			
Total:		421–708–43					
National championship Conference title Conference division title or championship game berth
^{†}Indicates Bowl Coalition, Bowl Alliance, BCS, or CFP / New Years' Six bowl.; ^{#}Rankings from final Coaches Poll.

== See also ==
- List of Ivy League football standings
