= 1987 Colgate Red Raiders football team =

American college football season

1987 Colgate Red Raiders football
- Conference: Colonial League
- Record: 7–4 (2–2 Colonial)
- Head coach: Frederick Dunlap (12th season)
- Captains: Kenny Gamble; Kyle Warwick
- Home stadium: Andy Kerr Stadium

1987 Colonial League football standings
	Conf.					Overall
Team	W		L		T	W		L		T
No. 1 Holy Cross $	4	–	0	–	0	11	–	0	–	0
Lehigh	3	–	1	–	1	5	–	5	–	1
Colgate	2	–	2	–	0	7	–	4	–	0
Lafayette	2	–	3	–	0	4	–	7	–	0
Bucknell	1	–	3	–	1	4	–	5	–	1
Davidson	0	–	3	–	0	1	–	10	–	0
$ – Conference champion; Rankings from NCAA Division I-AA Football Committee poll

The 1987 Colgate Red Raiders football team was an American football team that represented Colgate University during the 1987 NCAA Division I-AA football season. Colgate finished third in the Colonial League.

In its 12th and final season under head coach Frederick Dunlap, the team compiled a 7–4 record. Kenny Gamble and Kyle Warwick were the team captains.

Despite posting a winning record, the Red Raiders finished exactly even on the scoresheet, scoring 236 points and allowing 236 points over the course of the season. Colgate's 2–2 conference record placed third in the six-team Colonial League standings.

The Red Raiders spent two weeks in the national top 20 rankings, reaching No. 13 in the poll released September 22 and No. 11 on September 29, but then fell out of the rankings and were not ranked at season's end.

The team played its home games at Andy Kerr Stadium in Hamilton, New York.

== Schedule ==
Date	Opponent	Site	Result	Attendance	Source
September 5	at Duke*	Wallace Wade Stadium; Durham, NC	L 6–41	18,300	
September 12	Bucknell	Andy Kerr Stadium; Hamilton, NY	W 31–28	3,500	
September 19	No. 9 William & Mary*	Andy Kerr Stadium; Hamilton, NY	W 19–7	3,800	
September 26	at Cornell*	Schoellkopf Field; Ithaca, NY (rivalry)	W 27–3	18,000	
October 3	at No. 1 Holy Cross	Fitton Field; Worcester, MA	L 7–49	20,211	
October 10	Lehigh	Andy Kerr Stadium; Hamilton, NY	L 6–7	6,200	
October 17	at Army*	Michie Stadium; West Point, NY	W 22–20	40,578	
October 24	at Syracuse*	Carrier Dome; Syracuse, NY (rivalry)	L 6–52	48,097	
October 31	at Lafayette	Fisher Field; Easton, PA	W 35–14	6,700	
November 7	at Princeton*	Palmer Stadium; Princeton, NJ	W 39–15	8,653	
November 14	Boston University*	Andy Kerr Stadium; Hamilton, NY	W 38–0	3,500	
*Non-conference game; Rankings from NCAA Division I-AA Football Committee Poll released prior to the game
