= 1987 Princeton Tigers football team =

American college football season

1987 Princeton Tigers football
- Conference: Ivy League
- Record: 6–4 (4–3 Ivy)
- Head coach: Steve Tosches (1st season)
- Captain: Matthew B. Whalen
- Home stadium: Palmer Stadium

1987 Ivy League football standings
	Conf.					Overall
Team	W		L		T	W		L		T
Harvard $	6	–	1	–	0	8	–	2	–	0
Brown	5	–	2	–	0	7	–	3	–	0
Yale	5	–	2	–	0	7	–	3	–	0
Princeton	4	–	3	–	0	6	–	4	–	0
Cornell	4	–	3	–	0	5	–	5	–	0
Penn	3	–	4	–	0	4	–	6	–	0
Dartmouth	1	–	6	–	0	2	–	8	–	0
Columbia	0	–	7	–	0	0	–	10	–	0
$ – Conference champion

The 1987 Princeton Tigers football team was an American football team that represented Princeton University during the 1987 NCAA Division I-AA football season. Princeton tied for fourth in the Ivy League.

In their first year under head coach Steve Tosches, the Tigers compiled a 6–4 record and outscored opponents 230 to 155. Matthew B. Whalen was the team captain.

Princeton's 4–3 conference record tied for fourth in the Ivy League standings. The Tigers outscored Ivy opponents 157 to 95.

Princeton played its home games at Palmer Stadium on the university campus in Princeton, New Jersey.

== Schedule ==
Date	Opponent	Site	Result	Attendance	Source
September 19	at Dartmouth	Memorial Field; Hanover, NH	W 34–3	8,919	
September 26	at Davidson*	American Legion Memorial Stadium; Charlotte, NC	W 42–6	2,814	
October 3	at Brown	Brown Stadium; Providence, RI	L 7-13	7,100	
October 10	Columbia	Palmer Stadium; Princeton, NJ	W 38–8	11,247	
October 17	Lehigh*	Palmer Stadium; Princeton, NJ	W 16–15	13,800	
October 24	at Harvard	Harvard Stadium; Boston, MA (rivalry)	L 19–24	20,200	
October 31	at Penn	Franklin Field; Philadelphia, PA (rivalry)	W 17–7	31,255	
November 7	Colgate*	Palmer Stadium; Princeton, NJ	L 15–39	8,653	
November 14	Yale	Palmer Stadium; Princeton, NJ (rivalry)	L 19–34	26,029	
November 21	Cornell	Palmer Stadium; Princeton, NJ	W 23–6	4,134	
*Non-conference game
