= 1987 Dartmouth Big Green football team =

American college football season

1987 Dartmouth Big Green football
- Conference: Ivy League
- Record: 2–8 (1–6 Ivy)
- Head coach: Buddy Teevens (1st season)
- Captains: Matthew Drury; Brett Matthews
- Home stadium: Memorial Field

1987 Ivy League football standings
	Conf.					Overall
Team	W		L		T	W		L		T
Harvard $	6	–	1	–	0	8	–	2	–	0
Brown	5	–	2	–	0	7	–	3	–	0
Yale	5	–	2	–	0	7	–	3	–	0
Princeton	4	–	3	–	0	6	–	4	–	0
Cornell	4	–	3	–	0	5	–	5	–	0
Penn	3	–	4	–	0	4	–	6	–	0
Dartmouth	1	–	6	–	0	2	–	8	–	0
Columbia	0	–	7	–	0	0	–	10	–	0
$ – Conference champion

The 1987 Dartmouth Big Green football team was an American football team that represented Dartmouth College during the 1987 NCAA Division I-AA football season. Dartmouth finished second-to-last in the Ivy League.

In their first season under head coach Eugene "Buddy" Teevens, the Big Green compiled a 2–8 record and were outscored 302 to 113. Matthew Drury and Brett Matthews were the team captains.

The Big Green's 1–6 conference record placed seventh in the Ivy League standings. Dartmouth was outscored 192 to 46 by Ivy opponents. The team's only league win was a two-point victory over Columbia, a team in the midst of a five-year losing streak.

Dartmouth played its home games at Memorial Field on the college campus in Hanover, New Hampshire.

== Schedule ==
Date	Opponent	Site	Result	Attendance	Source
September 19	Princeton	Memorial Field; Hanover, NH	L 3–34	8,919	
September 26	at New Hampshire*	Cowell Stadium; Durham, NH (rivalry)	L 3–41	10,207	
October 3	Davidson*	Memorial Field; Hanover, NH	W 38–7	6,103	
October 10	No. 1 Holy Cross*	Memorial Field; Hanover, NH	L 23–62	11,109	
October 17	at Harvard	Harvard Stadium; Boston, MA (rivalry)	L 3–42	20,500	
October 24	at Cornell	Schoellkopf Field; Ithaca, NY (rivalry)	L 14–21	10,500	
October 31	Yale	Memorial Field; Hanover, NH	L 7–17	11,131	
November 7	at Columbia	Wien Stadium; New York, NY	W 12–10	6,875	
November 14	Brown	Memorial Field; Hanover, NH	L 0–19	6,114	
November 21	at Penn	Franklin Field; Philadelphia, PA	L 7–49	4,620	
*Non-conference game; Rankings from the latest NCAA Division I-AA poll released prior to the game
