= 1987 Davidson Wildcats football team =

American college football season

1987 Davidson Wildcats football
- Conference: Colonial League
- Record: 1–10 (0–3 Colonial)
- Head coach: Vic Gatto (3rd season)
- Home stadium: Richardson Stadium; American Legion Memorial Stadium

1987 Colonial League football standings
	Conf.					Overall
Team	W		L		T	W		L		T
No. 1 Holy Cross $	4	–	0	–	0	11	–	0	–	0
Lehigh	3	–	1	–	1	5	–	5	–	1
Colgate	2	–	2	–	0	7	–	4	–	0
Lafayette	2	–	3	–	0	4	–	7	–	0
Bucknell	1	–	3	–	1	4	–	5	–	1
Davidson	0	–	3	–	0	1	–	10	–	0
$ – Conference champion; Rankings from NCAA Division I-AA Football Committee poll

The 1987 Davidson Wildcats football team represented Davidson College as a member of the Colonial League during the 1987 NCAA Division I-AA football season. Led by third-year head coach Vic Gatto, the Wildcats compiled an overall record of 1–10 with a mark of 0–3 in conference play, placing last out of six teams in the Colonial.

== Schedule ==
Date	Opponent	Site	Result	Attendance	Source
September 5	at Presbyterian*	Bailey Stadium; Clinton, SC	L 7–24	2,000	
September 12	at Lehigh	Taylor Stadium; Bethlehem, PA	L 0–47		
September 19	Bucknell	Richardson Stadium; Davidson, NC	L 3–34	1,500	
September 26	Princeton*	American Legion Memorial Stadium; Charlotte, NC	L 6–42	2,814	
October 3	at Dartmouth*	Memorial Field; Hanover, NH	L 7–38		
October 10	Wingate*^{†}	Richardson Stadium; Davidson, NC	L 27–50	3,000	
October 17	at Lafayette	Fisher Stadium; Easton, PA	L 10–38	2,200	
October 24	at Wofford*	Snyder Field; Spartanburg, SC	W 10–0	3,000	
October 31	Furman*	Richardson Stadium; Davidson, NC	L 3–58		
November 7	West Virginia Tech*	Richardson Stadium; Davidson, NC	L 25–41		
November 14	Catawba*	Richardson Stadium; Davidson, NC	L 20–27	400	
*Non-conference game; ^{†}Homecoming
