= 1987 Bucknell Bison football team =

American college football season

1987 Bucknell Bison football
- Conference: Colonial League
- Record: 4–5–1 (1–3–1 Colonial)
- Head coach: George Landis (2nd season)
- Captains: Jim Given; Greg Schiano
- Home stadium: Memorial Stadium

1987 Colonial League football standings
	Conf.					Overall
Team	W		L		T	W		L		T
No. 1 Holy Cross $	4	–	0	–	0	11	–	0	–	0
Lehigh	3	–	1	–	1	5	–	5	–	1
Colgate	2	–	2	–	0	7	–	4	–	0
Lafayette	2	–	3	–	0	4	–	7	–	0
Bucknell	1	–	3	–	1	4	–	5	–	1
Davidson	0	–	3	–	0	1	–	10	–	0
$ – Conference champion; Rankings from NCAA Division I-AA Football Committee poll

The 1987 Bucknell Bison football team was an American football team that represented Bucknell University during the 1987 NCAA Division I-AA football season. It finished second-to-last in the Colonial League.

Bucknell played its home games at Memorial Stadium on the university campus in Lewisburg, Pennsylvania.

During its second year under head coach George Landis, the Bison compiled a 4–5–1 record. Jim Given and Greg Schiano were the team captains.

Bucknell's team was outscored 259 to 248. Its 1–3–1 conference record placed it fifth in the six-team Colonial League standings.

== Schedule ==
Date	Opponent	Site	Result	Attendance	Source
September 12	at Colgate	Andy Kerr Stadium; Hamilton, NY	L 28–31	3,500	
September 19	at Davidson	Richardson Stadium; Davidson, NC	W 34–3	1,500	
September 24	Penn*	Memorial Stadium; Lewisburg, PA	W 32–24	8,500	
October 3	at Harvard*	Harvard Stadium; Boston, MA	L 14–33	7,650	
October 10	at Lafayette	Fisher Field; Easton, PA	L 21–42	10,700	
October 17	No. 1 Holy Cross^	Memorial Stadium; Lewisburg, PA	L 10–48	11,240	
October 24	at Columbia^{†}*	Memorial Stadium; Lewisburg, PA	W 62–20	7,330	
October 31	at Cornell*	Schoellkopf Field; Ithaca, NY	W 20–6	6,000	
November 7	at William & Mary*	Cary Field; Williamsburg, VA	L 6–31	5,680	
November 14	Lehigh	Memorial Stadium; Lewisburg, PA	T 14–14	4,330	
*Non-conference game; ^{†}Homecoming; ^ Parents Weekend; Rankings from NCAA Division I-AA Football Committee Poll released prior to the game
