= 1987 Lehigh Engineers football team =

American college football season

1987 Lehigh Engineers football
- Conference: Colonial League
- Record: 5–5–1 (3–1–1 Colonial)
- Head coach: Hank Small (2nd season)
- Captains: Aaron Frantz; Kevin Rife
- Home stadium: Taylor Stadium

1987 Colonial League football standings
	Conf.					Overall
Team	W		L		T	W		L		T
No. 1 Holy Cross $	4	–	0	–	0	11	–	0	–	0
Lehigh	3	–	1	–	1	5	–	5	–	1
Colgate	2	–	2	–	0	7	–	4	–	0
Lafayette	2	–	3	–	0	4	–	7	–	0
Bucknell	1	–	3	–	1	4	–	5	–	1
Davidson	0	–	3	–	0	1	–	10	–	0
$ – Conference champion; Rankings from NCAA Division I-AA Football Committee poll

The 1987 Lehigh Engineers football team was an American football team that represented Lehigh University during the 1987 NCAA Division I-AA football season. Lehigh finished second in the Colonial League.

In their second year under head coach Hank Small, the Engineers compiled a 5–5–1 record.

The Engineers outscored opponents 221 to 201. Lehigh's 3–1–1 conference record placed second in the six-team Colonial League standings.

This was the 74th and final year that Lehigh played its home games at Taylor Stadium on the university's main campus in Bethlehem, Pennsylvania. The following year, Lehigh would open Goodman Stadium on the Goodman Campus; the former Taylor site is now occupied by Lehigh's business school and arts center.

== Schedule ==
Date	Opponent	Site	Result	Attendance	Source
September 12	Davidson	Taylor Stadium; Bethlehem, PA	W 47–0		
September 19	at Navy*	Navy–Marine Corps Memorial Stadium; Annapolis, MD	W 24–9	25,047	
September 26	at No. 1 Holy Cross	Taylor Stadium; Bethlehem, PA	L 6–63	12,500	
October 3	at William & Mary*	Cary Field; Williamsburg, VA	L 27–28	5,237	
October 10	at Colgate	Andy Kerr Stadium; Hamilton, NY	W 7–6	6,200	
October 17	at Princeton*	Palmer Stadium; Princeton, NJ	L 15–16	13,800	
October 24	Delaware*	Taylor Stadium; Bethlehem, PA (rivalry)	L 24–28	14,100	
October 31	at Columbia*	Wien Stadium; New York, NY	W 26–10	3,415	
November 7	Brown*	Taylor Stadium; Bethlehem, PA	L 7–10	13,300	
November 14	at Bucknell	Memorial Stadium; Lewisburg, PA	T 21–21	4,330	
November 21	at Lafayette	Taylor Stadium; Bethlehem, PA (The Rivalry)	W 17–10	17,000	
*Non-conference game; Rankings from the latest NCAA Division I-AA poll released prior to the game
