= Ed Zubrow =

American football player and coach (born 1951)

Biographical details
- Born: February 7, 1951 (age 75)

Playing career

Football
- c. 1970: Haverford

Baseball
- 1971–1973: Haverford

Coaching career (HC unless noted)

Football
- 1978–1980: Penn Charter (PA)
- 1981–1985: Penn (assistant)
- 1986–1988: Penn

Head coaching record
- Overall: 23–7 (college)

Accomplishments and honors

Championships
- 2 Ivy (1986, 1988)

Edward "Zeke" Zubrow (born February 7, 1951) is an American former football coach. He served as the head football coach at the University of Pennsylvania from 1986 to 1988, compiling a record of 23–7. After leading the Penn Quakers to two Ivy League titles, in 1986 and 1988, Zubrow resigned from his post at Penn in March 1989 to take a job with the School District of Philadelphia to combat drug abuse and dropout rates.

== Head coaching record ==
=== College ===
Year	Team	Overall	Conference	Standing	Bowl/playoffs
Penn Quakers (Ivy League) (1986–1988)
1986	Penn	10–0	7–0	1st	
1987	Penn	4–6	3–4	6th	
1988	Penn	9–1	6–1	T–1st	
Penn:		23–7	16–5		
Total:		23–7			
National championship Conference title Conference division title or championship game berth
