= 1987 Holy Cross Crusaders football team =

American college football season

1987 Holy Cross Crusaders football

Colonial League champion Lambert Cup winner
- Conference: Colonial League
- Record: 11–0 (4–0 Colonial)
- Head coach: Mark Duffner (2nd season)
- Defensive coordinator: Kevin Coyle (2nd season)
- Home stadium: Fitton Field

1987 Colonial League football standings
| | Conf. | | | | | Overall |
| Team | W | | L | | T | W | | L | | T |
|---|---|---|---|---|---|---|---|---|---|---|
| No. 1 Holy Cross $ | 4 | – | 0 | – | 0 | 11 | – | 0 | – | 0 |
| Lehigh | 3 | – | 1 | – | 1 | 5 | – | 5 | – | 1 |
| Colgate | 2 | – | 2 | – | 0 | 7 | – | 4 | – | 0 |
| Lafayette | 2 | – | 3 | – | 0 | 4 | – | 7 | – | 0 |
| Bucknell | 1 | – | 3 | – | 1 | 4 | – | 5 | – | 1 |
| Davidson | 0 | – | 3 | – | 0 | 1 | – | 10 | – | 0 |
$ – Conference champion; Rankings from NCAA Division I-AA Football Committee poll

The 1987 Holy Cross Crusaders football team was an American football team that represented the College of the Holy Cross as a member of the Colonial League during the 1987 NCAA Division I-AA football season. In its second year under head coach Mark Duffner, the team compiled an 11–0 record (4–0 against conference opponents) and won their second straight Colonial League championship. The team also claims a share of the Division I-AA national championship. The team played its home games at Fitton Field in Worcester, Massachusetts.

== Schedule ==
| Date | Opponent | Site | Result | Attendance | Source |
|---|---|---|---|---|---|
| September 12 | at Army* | Michie Stadium; West Point, NY | W 34–24 | 38,428 | |
| September 19 | Lafayette | Fitton Field; Worcester, MA | W 40–11 | 10,651 | |
| September 26 | at Lehigh | Taylor Stadium; Bethlehem, PA | W 63–6 | 12,500 | |
| October 3 | Colgate^{†} | Fitton Field; Worcester, MA | W 49–7 | 20,211 | |
| October 10 | at Dartmouth* | Memorial Field; Hanover, NH | W 62–23 | 11,109 | |
| October 17 | at Bucknell | Memorial Stadium; Lewisburg, PA | W 48–10 | 11,240 | |
| October 24 | Brown* | Fitton Field; Worcester, MA | W 41–0 | 20,661 | |
| October 31 | UMass* | McGuirk Stadium; Hadley, MA | W 54–10 | 15,214 | |
| November 7 | Harvard* | Fitton Field; Worcester, MA | W 41–6 | 17,211 | |
| November 14 | William & Mary* | Fitton Field; Worcester, MA | W 40–7 | 14,671 | |
| November 19 | at Villanova* | Villanova Stadium; Villanova, PA | W 39–6 | 13,400 | |
*Non-conference game; ^{†}Homecoming
