= Holy Cross Crusaders football =

Collegiate American football program

2026 Holy Cross Crusaders football team
- First season: 1891; 135 years ago (Note: The team was formed in 1884; 142 years ago, but they did not play any games until 1891.)
- Athletic director: Kit Hughes
- Head coach: Dan Curran; 2nd season, 9–15 (.375)
- Location: Worcester, Massachusetts
- Stadium: Fitton Field (capacity: 23,500)
- NCAA division: Division I FCS
- Conference: Patriot League
- Colors: Royal purple
- All-time record: 680–559–55 (.547)
- Bowl record: 0–1 (.000)

Conference championships
- Patriot League: 1986, 1987, 1989, 1990, 1991, 2009, 2019, 2020, 2021, 2022, 2023, 2024
- Rivalries: Boston College Eagles (rivalry); Fordham Rams (Ram–Crusader Cup)

Uniforms
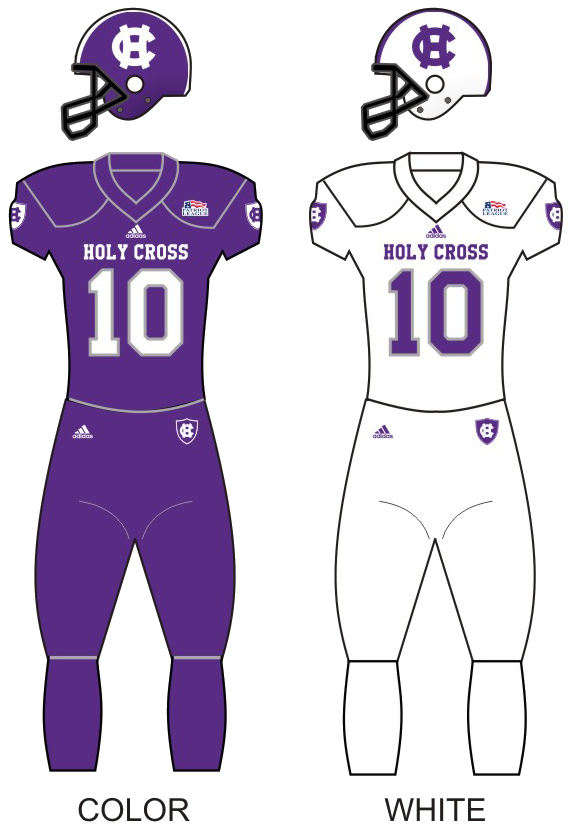
- Fight song: Chu! Chu! Rah! Rah!
- Marching band: Holy Cross Goodtime Marching Band
- Outfitter: Adidas
- Website: GoHolyCross.com

The Holy Cross Crusaders football team is the collegiate American football program of the College of the Holy Cross in Worcester, Massachusetts. The team is a member of the Patriot League, an NCAA Division I conference that participates in the Football Championship Subdivision (FCS). The team plays its home games at Fitton Field on the college campus.

== History ==
Football began at Holy Cross in 1884, with games against teams from other schools beginning in 1891. Early home games were played at several off-campus facilities in Worcester, including the Worcester College Grounds, Worcester Agricultural Fairgrounds and the Worcester Oval. The first intercollegiate game played on campus was a 6–0 defeat of Massachusetts Agricultural College on September 26, 1903, on the site of what is now Hanover Insurance Park at Fitton Field. In 1908, the football team moved to its own field adjacent to the baseball field, though both were known as "Fitton Field". Since 1910, the Holy Cross Crusader "Goodtime" Marching Band has performed halftime shows at home football games.

The original Fitton Field was built with wooden and concrete stands. These were replaced with steel stands in 1924 and aluminum seating in 1986. The largest crowd ever to pack Fitton Field was the 27,000 who showed up to see Holy Cross's All-American back Bill Osmanski in his last home game in 1938.

=== Boston College rivalry ===
In 1896, Holy Cross and Boston College played the first football game between the two schools, starting the Boston College–Holy Cross football rivalry. For much of the early to mid 20th century, BC and The Cross drew some of New England's largest sports crowds. To accommodate larger crowds, the Holy Cross game was routinely held at a large venue in Boston, with the 1916 matchup taking place at the newly constructed Fenway Park. A record 54,000 attended the 1922 game at Braves Field, home of the Boston Braves baseball team. On November 28, 1942, Holy Cross beat BC in a huge upset 55–12. The game is still the most famous between the two foes, not only for its result (which spoiled BC's undefeated season) but also its aftermath. The Eagles had booked their victory party that night at the popular Cocoanut Grove nightclub in Boston, but canceled after the loss. As a result, the BC team was absent when the club caught fire, killing nearly 500.

But fortune did not always favor the Crusaders, and the series was suspended in 1986 after BC had won 17 games over a 20-year span. After an over three-decade hiatus, the series resumed in 2018 as Holy Cross traveled to Chestnut Hill to take on Boston College. A rematch was held in 2023, which BC won 31–28.

=== 1946 Orange Bowl ===
In 1945, Holy Cross brought its best team in school history to the Orange Bowl. On January 1, 1946, Holy Cross lost to the University of Miami in its only bowl appearance. With the score tied 6–6 and only seconds remaining in regulation, Holy Cross was intercepted by Miami's Al Hudson, who ran the ball 89 yards for a touchdown. The final score was 13–6.

=== A glorious decade ===
In 1969, Holy Cross had to cancel the final eight games of the season when a contaminated faucet on a practice field led to an outbreak of hepatitis. Through the 1970s Holy Cross continued to play major East Coast football powers, but the Crusaders struggled to compete with the bigger schools.

In 1981, the NCAA dropped Holy Cross from the upper tier of football competition to Division I-AA. Holy Cross enjoyed a football renaissance over the next decade under coaches Rick E. Carter (35–19–2) and especially Mark Duffner (60–5–1). In 1983, the team led by Gill Fenerty was No. 3 in the nation in I-AA under Carter. Under Duffner, Holy Cross became the nation's most successful I-AA program. There were 11–0 seasons in both 1987 and 1991. Holy Cross won five Colonial League and Patriot League championships, four Lambert Cups, and four ECAC Team of the Year Awards. It also earned the No. 1 ranking in the final 1987 NCAA Division I-AA poll. In 1987 running back/defensive back Gordie Lockbaum finished third in the Heisman Trophy balloting after finishing fifth in 1986.

In the midst of these winning seasons, Holy Cross changed the direction of its football program. In 1986 it joined the Colonial League, a football-only conference that adopted the Ivy League model of need-based financial aid and grants rather than formal athletic scholarships. In 1990, the Colonial League became an all-sports conference and changed its name to the Patriot League; over time, it began allowing scholarships in non-football sports (with the recipients ineligible to play football), but continued to prohibit football scholarships through the 2012 season. In 2013, the Patriot League transitioned back to traditional scholarship football following Fordham’s decision to offer football scholarships in 2010.

=== 2009 season ===
In 2009, Holy Cross had one of its best teams since the founding of the Patriot League, led by star quarterback Dominic Randolph. The Crusaders won the league title and earned an automatic berth to the FCS playoffs, where they lost in the first round to eventual national champion Villanova.

=== The Chesney era and beyond ===
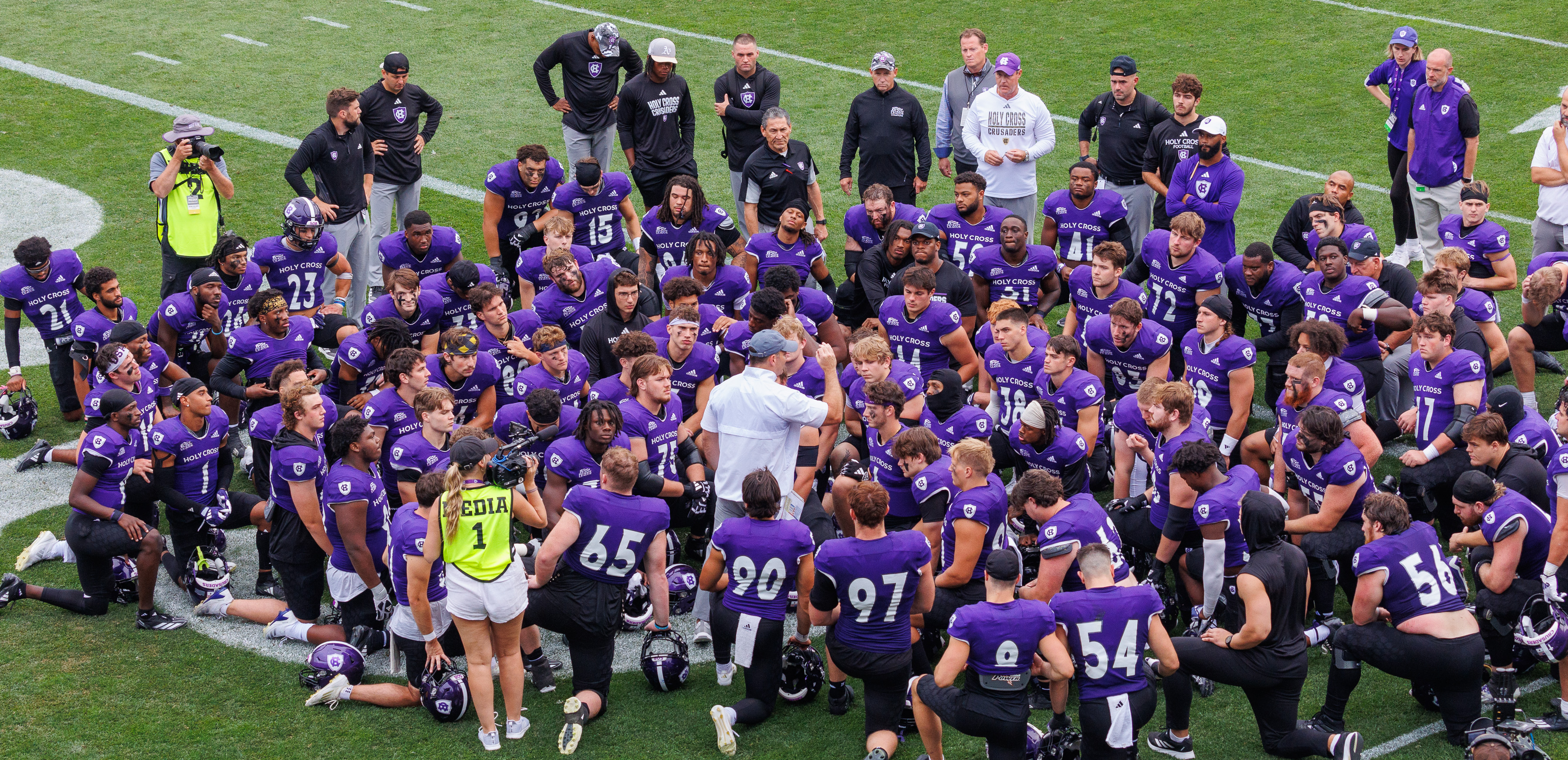
The 2024 team

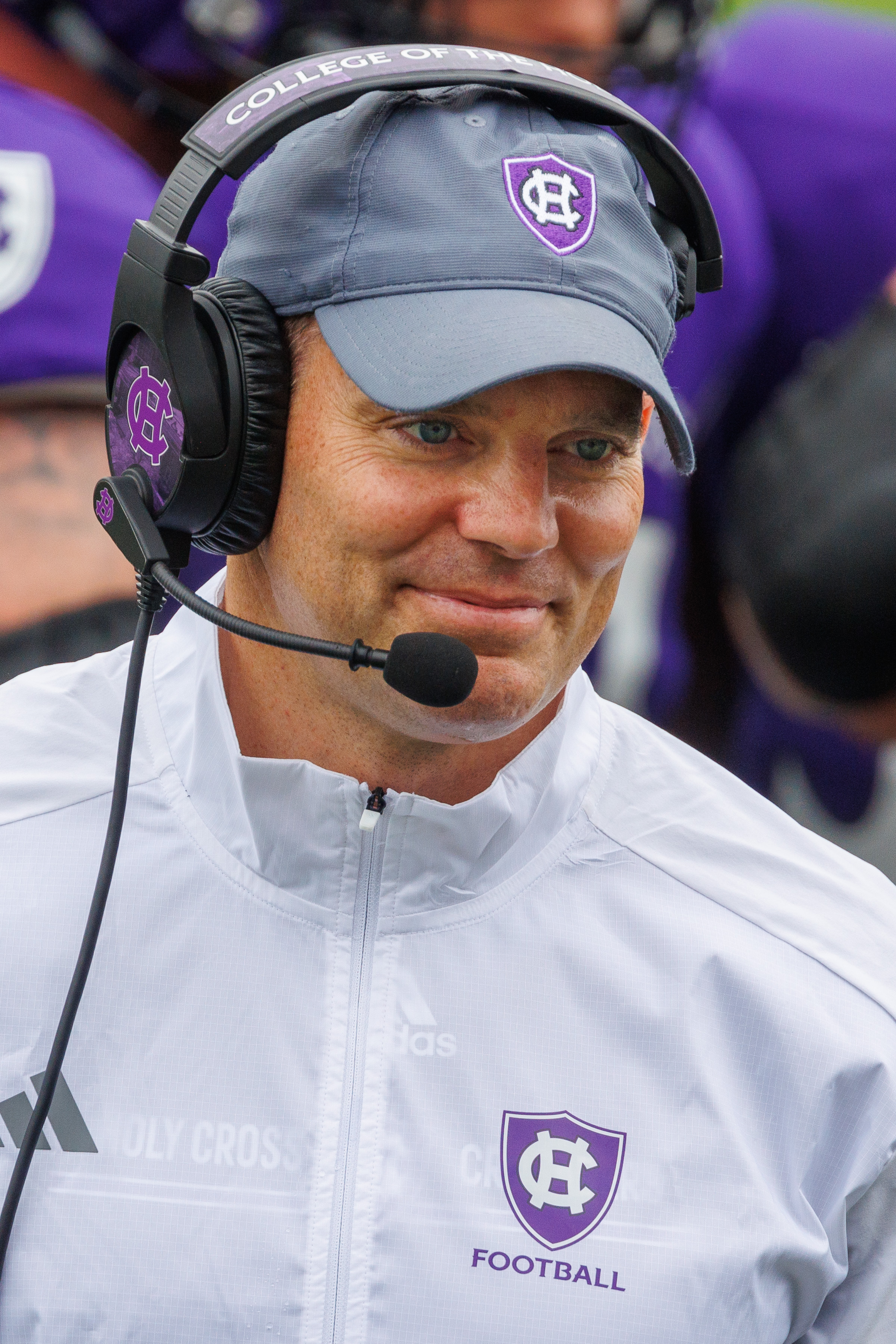
Head coach Dan Curran

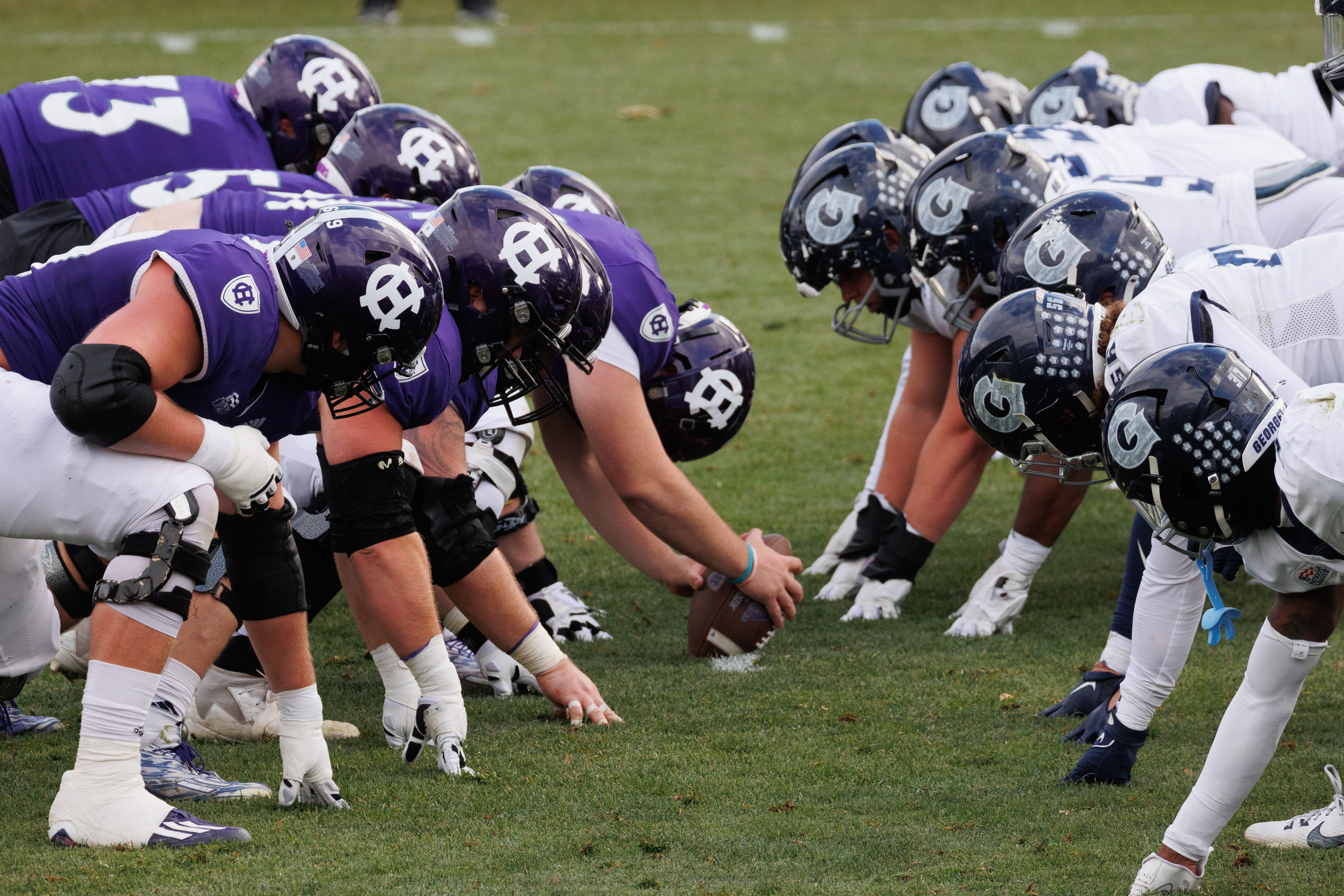
Holy Cross (left) lines up on offense before a snap against Georgetown at Fitton Field in 2023

Bob Chesney took over as Holy Cross head coach in 2018. In his first season, the Crusaders won their last 4 games to finish second in the Patriot League, notching a 4–2 Patriot League record and 5–6 overall standing.

The Crusaders' 2019 campaign produced a Patriot League title and a 5–1 conference standing, paired with a 7–6 record overall. Holy Cross earned an automatic berth to the FCS playoffs, where they lost in the first round to Monmouth.

In a shortened 2021 spring season, the Crusaders went undefeated in Patriot League play (3–0) and won the league title for the second year in a row.

In the fall 2021 season, the Crusaders won their third Patriot League Championship in a row, going 6–0 in conference play and 10–3 overall. The season also marked the first FCS playoff victory for Holy Cross, a 13–10 win over Sacred Heart in the first round. The Crusaders saw their season end once again at the hands of Villanova, however.

The 2022 season saw the team post an undefeated 11–0 regular season record, highlighted by a win at FBS opponent Buffalo and a sweep of Harvard and Yale. Their success saw them receive the #8 seed in the FCS playoffs, which carried with it a first-round bye and a home game in the round of 16. In poor weather conditions, the Crusaders took out New Hampshire 35–19 in Worcester to advance to play #1 overall seed South Dakota State, eventually losing 42–21.

Chesney left the program following the 2023 season after being hired as head coach of James Madison. He was succeeded by Merrimack's Dan Curran.

== Bowl game appearances ==
Season	Coach	Bowl	Opponent	Result
1945	John DaGrosa	Orange Bowl	Miami	L 6–13

== Division I-AA/FCS Playoffs results ==
The Crusaders have appeared in the FCS playoffs six times with an overall record of 2–6.

Year	Round	Opponent	Result
1983	Quarterfinals	Western Carolina	L 21–28
2009	First Round	Villanova	L 28–38
2019	First Round	Monmouth	L 27–44
2020	First Round	South Dakota State	L 3–31
2021	First Round; Second Round	Sacred Heart; Villanova	W 13–10; L 16–21
2022	Second Round; Quarterfinals	New Hampshire; South Dakota State	W 35–19; L 21–42

== Appearances in the final Associated Press poll ==
Holy Cross has made 39 appearances in the AP Poll since it was introduced for the 1936 season, peaking at No. 9 in 1938. Holy Cross has finished the year ranked in the final Associated Press poll of the season 5 times:

Year	Rank	Record
1937	14	8–0–2
1938	9	8–1
1942	19	5–4–1
1945	16	8–1
1951	19	8–2

== Hall of Fame honors ==
Pro Football Hall of Fame:

- George Connor – ex-class of 1948

College Football Hall of Fame:

- Eddie Anderson – coach 1933–1938, 1950–1964
- George Connor – ex-class of 1948
- Ed Healey – ex-class of 1917
- Gordie Lockbaum – class of 1988
- Bill Osmanski – class of 1939
- Bill Swiacki – ex-class of 1945

== Future non-conference opponents ==
Future non-conference opponents announced as of December 15, 2025.

2026	2027	2028
at Miami (OH)	at Northwestern	at Navy
Yale	Central Connecticut	at Central Connecticut
at Harvard	at Yale	Yale
