= 1987 Harvard Crimson football team =

American college football season

1987 Harvard Crimson football

Ivy League champion
- Conference: Ivy League
- Record: 8–2 (6–1 Ivy)
- Head coach: Joe Restic (17th season)
- Captain: Kevin J. Dulsky
- Home stadium: Harvard Stadium

1987 Ivy League football standings
	Conf.					Overall
Team	W		L		T	W		L		T
Harvard $	6	–	1	–	0	8	–	2	–	0
Brown	5	–	2	–	0	7	–	3	–	0
Yale	5	–	2	–	0	7	–	3	–	0
Princeton	4	–	3	–	0	6	–	4	–	0
Cornell	4	–	3	–	0	5	–	5	–	0
Penn	3	–	4	–	0	4	–	6	–	0
Dartmouth	1	–	6	–	0	2	–	8	–	0
Columbia	0	–	7	–	0	0	–	10	–	0
$ – Conference champion

The 1987 Harvard Crimson football team was an American football team that represented Harvard University during the 1987 NCAA Division I-AA football season. Harvard was champion of the Ivy League.

In their 17th year under head coach Joe Restic, the Crimson compiled an 8–2 record and outscored opponents 243 to 163. Kevin J. Dulsky was the team captain.

Harvard's 6–1 conference record was the best in the Ivy League standings. The Crimson outscored Ivy opponents 177 to 84.

The Crimson briefly appeared in the weekly national top 20, achieving No. 20 in the poll released November 3, but fell out of the rankings the next week and remained unranked through the end of the season.

Harvard played its home games at Harvard Stadium in the Allston neighborhood of Boston, Massachusetts.

== Schedule ==
Date	Opponent	Site	Result	Attendance	Source
September 19	at Columbia	Wien Stadium; New York, NY	W 35–0	6,449	
September 26	Northeastern*	Harvard Stadium; Boston, MA	W 27–24	15,900	
October 3	Bucknell*	Harvard Stadium; Boston, MA	W 33–14	7,650	
October 10	at Cornell	Schoellkopf Field; Ithaca, NY	L 17–29	21,000	
October 17	Dartmouth	Harvard Stadium; Boston, MA (rivalry)	W 42–3	20,500	
October 24	Princeton	Harvard Stadium; Boston, MA (rivalry)	W 24–19	20,200	
October 31	at Brown	Brown Stadium; Providence, RI	W 14–9	16,800	
November 7	at No. 1 Holy Cross*	Fitton Field; Worcester, MA	L 6–41	17,211	
November 14	Penn	Harvard Stadium; Boston, MA (rivalry)	W 31–14	14,900	
November 21	at Yale	Yale Bowl; New Haven, CT (The Game)	W 14–10	66,548	
*Non-conference game; Rankings from NCAA Division I-AA Football Committee Poll released prior to the game
