= 1987 Lafayette Leopards football team =

American college football season

1987 Lafayette Leopards football
- Conference: Colonial League
- Record: 4–7 (2–3 Colonial)
- Head coach: Bill Russo (7th season)
- Captains: Jim Johnson; Dave MacPhee
- Home stadium: Fisher Field

1987 Colonial League football standings
	Conf.					Overall
Team	W		L		T	W		L		T
No. 1 Holy Cross $	4	–	0	–	0	11	–	0	–	0
Lehigh	3	–	1	–	1	5	–	5	–	1
Colgate	2	–	2	–	0	7	–	4	–	0
Lafayette	2	–	3	–	0	4	–	7	–	0
Bucknell	1	–	3	–	1	4	–	5	–	1
Davidson	0	–	3	–	0	1	–	10	–	0
$ – Conference champion; Rankings from NCAA Division I-AA Football Committee poll

The 1987 Lafayette Leopards football team was an American football team that represented Lafayette College during the 1987 NCAA Division I-AA football season. Lafayette finished fourth in the Colonial League.

In their seventh year under head coach Bill Russo, the Leopards compiled a 4–7 record. Jim Johnson and Dave MacPhee were the team captains.

Despite posting a losing record, the Leopards outscored opponents 264 to 257. Lafayette's 2–3 conference record placed fourth in the six-team Colonial League standings.

Lafayette played its home games at Fisher Field on College Hill in Easton, Pennsylvania.

== Schedule ==
Date	Opponent	Site	Result	Attendance	Source
September 12	Kutztown*	Fisher Field; Easton, PA	W 29–17		
September 19	at No. 2 Holy Cross	Fitton Field; Worcester, MA	L 11–40	10,651	
September 26	Columbia*	Fisher Field; Easton, PA	W 38–7	9,100	
October 3	at Cornell*	Schoellkopf Field; Ithaca, NY	L 12–17	9,000	
October 10	Bucknell^{†}	Fisher Field; Easton, PA	W 42–21	10,700	
October 17	Davidson	Fisher Field; Easton, PA	W 38–10	2,200	
October 24	at No. 8 New Hampshire*	Cowell Stadium; Durham, NH	L 19–21	8,455	
October 31	Colgate	Fisher Field; Easton, PA	L 14–35	6,700	
November 7	Penn*	Fisher Field; Easton, PA	L 14–23	5,200	
November 14	at Army*	Michie Stadium; West Point, NY	L 37–49	37,195	
November 21	at Lehigh	Taylor Stadium; Bethlehem, PA (The Rivalry)	L 10–17	17,000	
*Non-conference game; ^{†}Homecoming; Rankings from NCAA Division I-AA Football Committee Poll released prior to the game
