= 1987 Cornell Big Red football team =

American college football season

1987 Cornell Big Red football
- Conference: Ivy League
- Record: 5–5 (4–3 Ivy)
- Head coach: Maxie Baughan (5th season)
- Captains: Dave Quarles; Lee Reherman; Gary Rinkus
- Home stadium: Schoellkopf Field

1987 Ivy League football standings
| | Conf. | | | | | Overall |
| Team | W | | L | | T | W | | L | | T |
|---|---|---|---|---|---|---|---|---|---|---|
| Harvard $ | 6 | – | 1 | – | 0 | 8 | – | 2 | – | 0 |
| Brown | 5 | – | 2 | – | 0 | 7 | – | 3 | – | 0 |
| Yale | 5 | – | 2 | – | 0 | 7 | – | 3 | – | 0 |
| Princeton | 4 | – | 3 | – | 0 | 6 | – | 4 | – | 0 |
| Cornell | 4 | – | 3 | – | 0 | 5 | – | 5 | – | 0 |
| Penn | 3 | – | 4 | – | 0 | 4 | – | 6 | – | 0 |
| Dartmouth | 1 | – | 6 | – | 0 | 2 | – | 8 | – | 0 |
| Columbia | 0 | – | 7 | – | 0 | 0 | – | 10 | – | 0 |
$ – Conference champion

The 1987 Cornell Big Red football team was an American football team that represented Cornell University during the 1987 NCAA Division I-AA football season. Cornell tied for fourth in the Ivy League.

In its fifth season under head coach Maxie Baughan, the team compiled a 5–5 record and was outscored 197 to 154. Lee Reherman, Gary Rinkus and Dave Quarles were the team captains.

Cornell's 4–3 conference record tied for fourth in the Ivy League standings. The Big Red was outscored 138 to 128 by Ivy opponents.

Cornell played its home games at Schoellkopf Field in Ithaca, New York.

== Schedule ==
| Date | Opponent | Site | Result | Attendance | Source |
|---|---|---|---|---|---|
| September 19 | at No. 19 Penn | Franklin Field; Philadelphia, PA (rivalry) | W 17–13 | 21,359 | |
| September 26 | Colgate* | Schoellkopf Field; Ithaca, NY (rivalry) | L 3–27 | 18,000 | |
| October 3 | Lafayette* | Schoellkopf Field; Ithaca, NY | W 17–12 | 9,000 | |
| October 10 | Harvard | Schoellkopf Field; Ithaca, NY | W 29–17 | 21,000 | |
| October 17 | at Brown | Brown Stadium; Providence, RI | L 15–23 | 11,200 | |
| October 24 | Dartmouth^{†} | Schoellkopf Field; Ithaca, NY | W 21–14 | 10,500 | |
| October 31 | Bucknell* | Schoellkopf Field; Ithaca, NY | L 6–20 | 6,000 | |
| November 7 | at Yale | Yale Bowl; New Haven, CT | L 9–28 | 20,188 | |
| November 14 | Columbia | Schoellkopf Field; Ithaca, NY (rivalry) | W 31–20 | 7,500 | |
| November 21 | at Princeton | Palmer Stadium; Princeton, NJ | L 6–23 | 4,134 | |
*Non-conference game; ^{†}Homecoming; Rankings from the latest NCAA Division I-AA poll released prior to the game
