= 1987 Brown Bears football team =

American college football season

1987 Brown Bears football
- Conference: Ivy League
- Record: 7–3 (5–2 Ivy)
- Head coach: John Rosenberg (4th season)
- Offensive coordinator: Peter Giunta (1st season)
- Defensive coordinator: Lou Ferrari (1st season)
- Captains: Walt Cataldo; Mark Donovan
- Home stadium: Brown Stadium

1987 Ivy League football standings
	Conf.					Overall
Team	W		L		T	W		L		T
Harvard $	6	–	1	–	0	8	–	2	–	0
Brown	5	–	2	–	0	7	–	3	–	0
Yale	5	–	2	–	0	7	–	3	–	0
Princeton	4	–	3	–	0	6	–	4	–	0
Cornell	4	–	3	–	0	5	–	5	–	0
Penn	3	–	4	–	0	4	–	6	–	0
Dartmouth	1	–	6	–	0	2	–	8	–	0
Columbia	0	–	7	–	0	0	–	10	–	0
$ – Conference champion

The 1987 Brown Bears football team was an American football team that represented Brown University during the 1987 NCAA Division I-AA football season. Brown finished second in the Ivy League.

In their fourth season under head coach John Rosenberg, the Bears compiled a 7–3 record but were outscored 160 to 144. Walt Cataldo and Mark Donovan were the team captains.

The Bears' 5–2 conference record placed second in the Ivy League standings. They outscored Ivy opponents 117 to 97.

Brown played its home games at Brown Stadium in Providence, Rhode Island.

== Schedule ==
Date	Opponent	Site	Result	Attendance	Source
September 19	at Yale	Yale Bowl; New Haven, CT	W 17–7	11,658	
September 26	Rhode Island*	Brown Stadium; Providence, RI (rivalry)	W 17–15	13,500	
October 3	Princeton	Brown Stadium; Providence, RI	W 13–7	7,100	
October 10	at Penn	Franklin Field; Philadelphia, PA	L 17–38	27,253	
October 17	Cornell	Brown Stadium; Providence, RI	W 23–15	11,200	
October 24	at No. 1 Holy Cross*	Fitton Field; Worcester, MA	L 0–41	20,661	
October 31	Harvard	Brown Stadium; Providence, RI	L 9–14	16,800	
November 7	at Lehigh*	Taylor Stadium; Bethlehem, PA	W 10–7	13,300	
November 14	at Dartmouth	Memorial Field; Hanover, NH	W 19–0	6,114	
November 21	Columbia	Brown Stadium; Providence, RI	W 19–16	27,050	
*Non-conference game; Rankings from the latest NCAA Division I-AA poll released prior to the game
