= 1987 Penn Quakers football team =

American college football season

1987 Penn Quakers football
- Conference: Ivy League
- Record: 4–6 (3–4 Ivy)
- Head coach: Ed Zubrow (2nd season)
- Offensive coordinator: Dick Maloney (2nd season)
- Captains: Mike Lista; Brent Novoselsky
- Home stadium: Franklin Field

1987 Ivy League football standings
	Conf.					Overall
Team	W		L		T	W		L		T
Harvard $	6	–	1	–	0	8	–	2	–	0
Brown	5	–	2	–	0	7	–	3	–	0
Yale	5	–	2	–	0	7	–	3	–	0
Princeton	4	–	3	–	0	6	–	4	–	0
Cornell	4	–	3	–	0	5	–	5	–	0
Penn	3	–	4	–	0	4	–	6	–	0
Dartmouth	1	–	6	–	0	2	–	8	–	0
Columbia	0	–	7	–	0	0	–	10	–	0
$ – Conference champion

The 1987 Penn Quakers football team represented the University of Pennsylvania in the 1987 NCAA Division I-AA football season.

== Schedule ==
Date	Opponent	Rank	Site	Result	Attendance	Source
September 19	Cornell	No. 19	Franklin Field; Philadelphia, PA (rivalry)	L 13–17	21,359	
September 26	at Bucknell*		Memorial Stadium; Lewisburg, PA	L 24–31	8,500	
October 3	at Columbia		Wien Stadium; New York, NY	W 23–0	4,150	
October 10	Brown		Franklin Field; Philadelphia, PA	W 38–17	27,253	
October 17	Navy*		Franklin Field; Philadelphia, PA	L 28–38	16,809	
October 24	at Yale		Yale Bowl; New Haven, CT	L 22–28	23,151	
October 31	Princeton		Franklin Field; Philadelphia, PA (rivalry)	L 7–17	31,255	
November 7	at Lafayette*		Fisher Stadium; Easton, PA	W 23–14	5,200	
November 14	Harvard		Harvard Stadium; Boston, MA (rivalry)	L 14–31	14,900	
November 21	at Dartmouth		Franklin Field; Philadelphia, PA	W 49–17	4,620	
*Non-conference game; Rankings from NCAA Division I-AA Football Committee Poll released prior to the game

== Roster ==
1987 Penn Quakers football team roster
Players
Coaches
Offense

Pos.	#	Name	Class
RB	27	Chris Flynn	Sr
C		Tom Gizzi	Jr
TE	85	Brent Novoselsky	Sr

Defense

Pos.	#	Name	Class
DE	94	Mike Lista	Sr
CB	21	Donald Wilson	Sr

Special teams

Pos.	#	Name	Class
P	4	Dave Fassnachi	Sr
K	3	Jim Grass	Sr

Head coach

- Ed Zubrow

Coordinators/assistant coaches

- Gary Schnell

Legend

- (C) Team captain
- (S) Suspended
- (I) Ineligible
- Injured
- Redshirt
