= 1987 Yale Bulldogs football team =

American college football season

1987 Yale Bulldogs football
- Conference: Ivy League
- Record: 7–3 (5–2 Ivy)
- Head coach: Carmen Cozza (23rd season)
- Home stadium: Yale Bowl

1987 Ivy League football standings
	Conf.					Overall
Team	W		L		T	W		L		T
Harvard $	6	–	1	–	0	8	–	2	–	0
Brown	5	–	2	–	0	7	–	3	–	0
Yale	5	–	2	–	0	7	–	3	–	0
Princeton	4	–	3	–	0	6	–	4	–	0
Cornell	4	–	3	–	0	5	–	5	–	0
Penn	3	–	4	–	0	4	–	6	–	0
Dartmouth	1	–	6	–	0	2	–	8	–	0
Columbia	0	–	7	–	0	0	–	10	–	0
$ – Conference champion

The 1987 Yale Bulldogs football team represented Yale University in the 1987 NCAA Division I-AA football season. The Bulldogs were led by 23rd-year head coach Carmen Cozza, played their home games at the Yale Bowl and finished in third place in the Ivy League with a 5–2 record, 7–3 overall.

== Schedule ==
Date	Opponent	Site	Result	Attendance	Source
September 19	Brown	Yale Bowl; New Haven, CT	L 7–17	11,658	
September 26	Connecticut*	Yale Bowl; New Haven, CT	W 30–27	34,068	
October 3	at Hawaii*	Aloha Stadium; Halawa, HI	L 10–62	41,447	
October 10	William & Mary*	Yale Bowl; New Haven, CT	W 40–34	20,217	
October 17	at Columbia	Wien Stadium; New York, NY	W 27–13	7,750	
October 24	Penn	Yale Bowl; New Haven, CT	W 28–22	23,151	
October 31	at Dartmouth	Memorial Field; Hanover, NH	W 17–7	11,131	
November 7	Cornell	Yale Bowl; New Haven, CT	W 28–9	20,188	
November 14	at Princeton	Palmer Stadium; Princeton, NJ (rivalry)	W 34–19	26,029	
November 21	Harvard	Yale Bowl; New Haven, CT (The Game)	L 10–14	66,548	
*Non-conference game
