= Kenny Gamble (American football) =

American football player (born 1965)

No. 48, 22
- Position: Running back

Personal information
- Born: March 8, 1965 (age 61); Holyoke, Massachusetts, U.S.
- Listed height: 5 ft 10 in (1.78 m)
- Listed weight: 197 lb (89 kg)

Career information
- High school: Cushing (Ashburnham, Massachusetts)
- College: Colgate (1984–1987)
- NFL draft: 1988: 10th round, 251st overall pick

Career history
- Kansas City Chiefs (1988–1991); Buffalo Bills (1992)*
- * Offseason or practice squad member only

Awards and highlights
- Walter Payton Award (1987)

Career NFL statistics
- Rushing yards: 24
- Rushing average: 4
- Rushing touchdowns: 1
- Receptions: 3
- Receiving yards: –5
- Stats at Pro Football Reference
- College Football Hall of Fame

Kenneth Patrick Gamble (born March 8, 1965) is an American former professional football player who was a running back for the Kansas City Chiefs of the National Football League (NFL) from 1988 to 1990. He played college football for the Colgate Raiders, winning the first-ever Walter Payton Award in 1987. He was selected 251st overall by the Chiefs in the tenth round of the 1988 NFL draft. Gamble was elected to the College Football Hall of Fame in 2002.
