= Holy Cross Goodtime Marching Band =

Marching band of the College of the Holy Cross

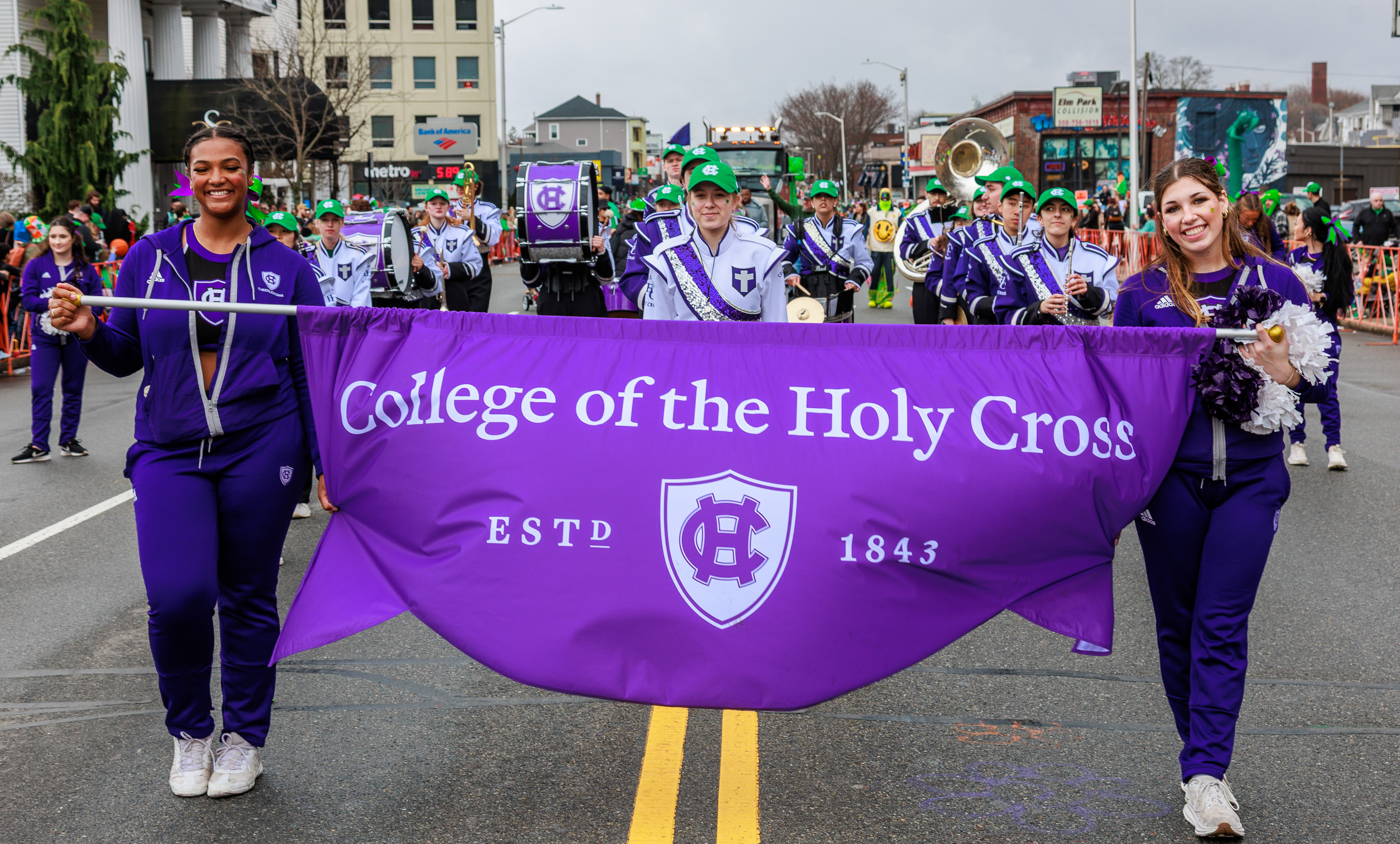
- 2025 Worcester Saint Patrick's Day parade
- School: College of the Holy Cross
- Location: Worcester, Massachusetts
- Conference: Patriot League
- Founded: 1845
- Fight song: "Chu Chu, Rah Rah"
- Website: www.holycross.edu/office-student-involvement/spirit-programs

Formed in 1845, the Holy Cross Goodtime Marching Band is one of the oldest organizations at The College of the Holy Cross in Worcester, Massachusetts, USA, and one of the oldest college bands in the United States. The Crusaders Marching Band first began performing at football games in 1910 and the band's role has expanded significantly since to include other athletic appearances, performing at all home football games, selected away games, in exhibition at high school band competitions, and at various events throughout the country. In the spring, the marching band converts into the Holy Cross Bettertime Pep Band and plays at all home basketball games, and travels with the teams to the NCAA tournament. The Marching Band performs at Fitton Field while the Pep Band plays in the Hart Center. In March 2025, the band appeared in the Worcester County St. Patrick’s Parade.

== Membership ==
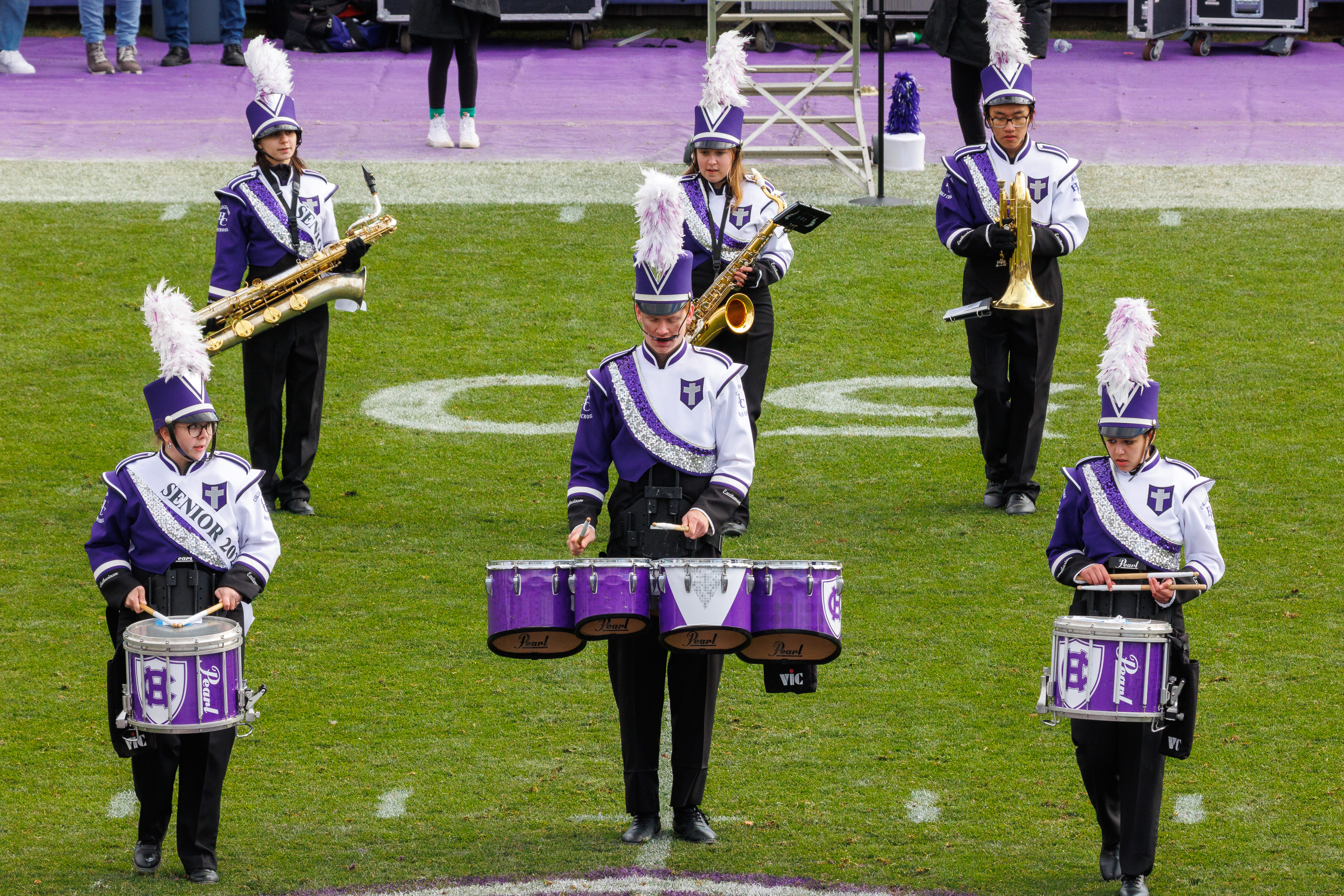
2023

The Goodtime Marching Band consists of wind players, on-field battery, and a contemporary front ensemble with an electric guitar, electric bass, keys, and drum set. The band also hosts a featured twirler, who performs during the football halftime shows and spirit events in addition to representing Holy Cross at regional and national competitions. Band membership is open to students throughout the Worcester Consortium of Schools (as Holy Cross is the only school in the city that has a Division I affiliated marching band), and students from Clark University and Worcester State University are currently represented.

Membership consists of primarily non-music majors, with current students coming from more than 20 academic majors, minors, and concentrations. Participation is accessible for students from a variety of musical and marching backgrounds, and members have the opportunity to move into the college early for an August Band Camp to practice music and drill. During the fall season, students rehearse twice a week for 90 minutes, in addition to performances at home football games that include a pre-game field show of traditional Holy Cross music, pop-music in the stands, a halftime show, and a post-game concert. Despite their commitment to the band, members are able to and usually do remain in good academic standing as well; the HCGTMB boasts and average grade point average of 3.55.

== History ==
The Holy Cross Crusaders Marching Band in the familiar HC formation

The Holy Cross Bands Program is one of the oldest organizations on campus. It is only two years younger than the college, dating back to 1845 and the founding of the College Brass. The band was led by the founding director, Samuel Reeves Leland (1817-1885) who taught at the college 1843–1864. The Marching Band played its first football halftime show in 1910 and has been an active presence at Crusader football ever since.

=== 1920–1951 ===
The band was led by J. Edward Bouvier (1884-1970), Director of Holy Cross Music Clubs. In addition to the band, he directed the Glee Club and Philharmonic Orchestra and conducted over 1000 performances of these groups during his 31 years on Mount St. James.

=== 1947–1966 ===
Frederick "Doc" Mirliani, class of '32, was hired by Bouvier and was director of the band, orchestra, and glee club from 1947 until 1966. His glee club was nationally recognized when it was awarded First Place (twice) in the US for catholic colleges. The glee club did annual tours of various cities in the US, and was recorded on Capitol Records three times. His arrangements for the glee club and band were known for exhibiting the iconic "Mirliani Idiom".

=== 1981–2002 ===
Robert "Bob" A. Principe

=== Other past directors ===
Rob Hammerton, Matt Glenn, Frederick "Doc" Mirliani ('32)

=== 100th anniversary ===
The HCMB conducted a celebration of its first performance on Fitton Field which occurred in 1910 in October 2010. The celebration included a gathering for past band alumni and current band members to discuss memories and history of the Holy Cross Band Program.

=== 2010–2015 ===
During the 2010 season, the band was left without a director just before the beginning of the football season. A former band member and 2009 graduate, Matthew Cain, stepped in and served as interim director, organizing and conducting weekly rehearsals, coordinating non-athletic performances, and even arranging songs for the band to play at basketball games during pep season. During the season, the band looked to hire a permanent director, and appointed Nicholas J. McKenzie, a graduate of UMass Amherst and a professional in both band direction and drill coordination. McKenzie assumed his position at the end of the marching season in 2010 and, under his leadership, the band has unveiled new uniforms and a new field show. The band debuted the show and uniform at the first night game held at Holy Cross' Fitton Field, on 1 September 2011, a game against UMass. The band was well received by the crowd of almost 20,000 fans, alumni and students.

=== 2015–2018 ===
In 2015, the college hired as its new director of bands Dr. Steven Riley (D.M.A., University of Iowa). Under his direction, the Bands Program launched the College Concert Band, which quickly became Holy Cross’ largest performing ensemble and now presents two concerts per year. During Riley's tenure the HCGTMB has performed in Yankee Stadium for the Ram-Crusader Cup (2016) and hosted eight collegiate bands in exhibition for the New England Collegiate Marching Band Festival (2017). His and the band's work was formally acknowledged by the college in 2016 when it awarded them the Rev. Ciampi Award.

=== 2018–2021 ===
Following Riley's departure for Arkansas State University, the college hired Dr. Ernest Jennings (D.M.A., University of Iowa) to take over as director of bands. Following his arrival, the band invested extensively in its music library, percussion equipment, and new heavy weather uniforms. In coming years Jennings will oversee the program's further integration with the college's department of music and forthcoming Center for the Arts and Creativity.*

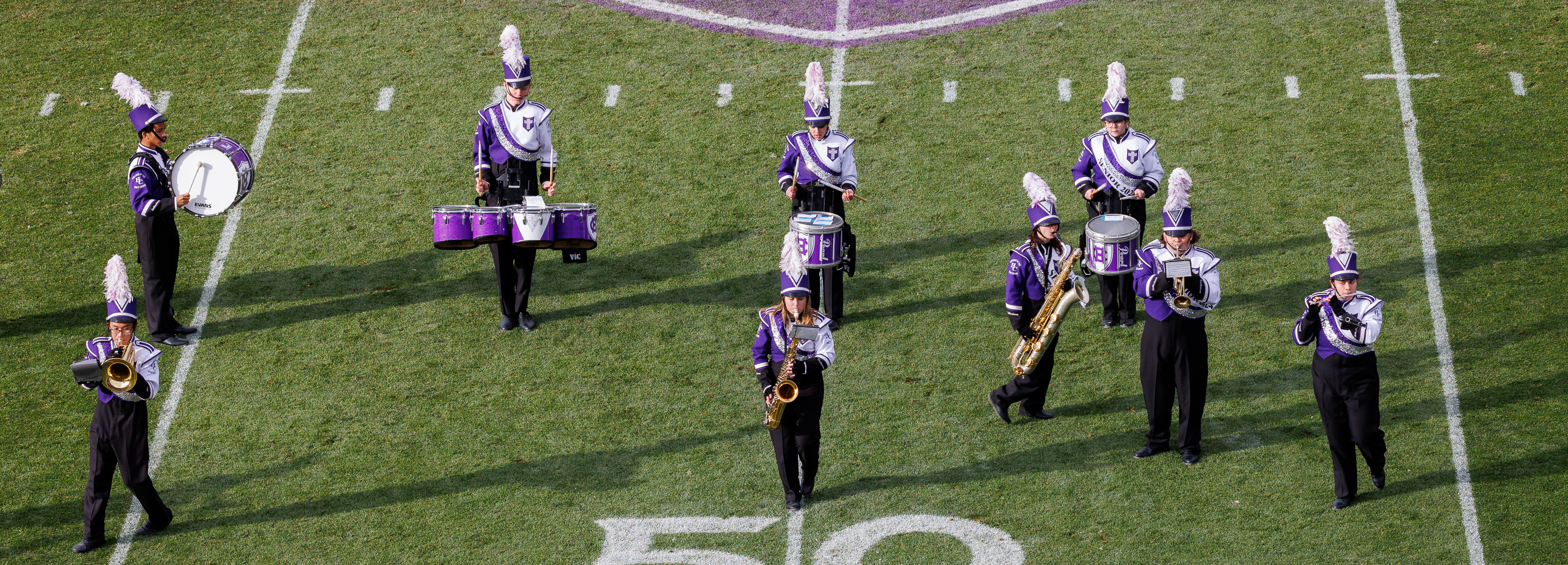
Goodtime Marching Band in 2023

=== 175th anniversary ===
In the 2018–2019 academic year, the college celebrated 175 years since its founding, otherwise known as its dodransbicentennial. As part of the festivities, the marching band performed at several special performances throughout the year, including a 175th Anniversary picnic and a celebration of music's place in Holy Cross’ Jesuit heritage. The HCGTMB also celebrated with a 1-7-5 themed field show, featuring music from Blondie, the White Stripes, and Beethoven.

=== 2021–present ===
In June 2021 Duane Melzer (M.M., Boston University/D.M.E. student L.U.) was appointed associate director of Bands and upon the departure of Dr. Jennings, was appointed Interim Director of Bands in September 2021. By 2025, Melzer had left Holy Cross to become Director of the Pep Band at Johns Hopkins University.

== Traditions ==
As an institution over 180 years old, the Goodtime Marching Band is rich in school traditions:

=== Holy Cross songs ===
The marching band, along with the College Choir, keeps alive the musical traditions of Mount Saint James. Band members learn to play the college fight song Chu Chu Rah Rah, its alma mater (which is famously set to the same tune as Oh Christmas Tree), and its victory march, Hoiah! Another favorite played by the band is the school classic Mamie Reilly.

The lyrics to the College Fight Song are:

Ring out then your Hoiah with

A Chu, Chu, Rah, Rah,

A Chu, Chu, Rah, Rah!

A Chu, Chu, Rah, Rah!

Give another Hoiah and a Chu, Chu, Rah, Rah!

A Chu, Chu, Rah, Rah, for Holy Cross!

March on as knights of old

(With hearts as) loyal and true and bold,

And wage the bitter fight with all your might,

Fight hard for Holy Cross!

You'll know when battle's done,

(It was for) her that the fight was won,

Oh, may it never die, that battle cry,

On, on for Holy Cross!

=== The band name ===
While usually referred to as the Goodtime Marching Band, the band's full name is ever-evolving. Each graduating class of seniors chooses a new clause to be added to the “official” name of the band. The new addition is read when the band takes the field each year for its homecoming halftime performance, a day when alumni often come back to perform in the stands.

As of 2023, the band's complete title reads:

The Holy Cross Crusader, Hit and Run, Giant Killer, Neutral Field, Pull Through the Clutch, Never Say Die, Have Ticket Will Fly, Have Coffee Will Sober, Legendary and Notorious, Tug of War, Apple Corps, Halloween Howling, Rugby Shirt Erasing, Only Undefeated, Papally Blessed, Award Winning, Lost in Paramus, Cigar Smoking, Push It, Tone Deaf, Waterlogged, "Got There, Got There," Our Power is Beyond Your Understanding, Lush and Haunting, Feeling the Unit, Topless on the Turnpike, Visually Stimulating, Sublimely Sybaritic, What About Bob?, Band is Safe Fun, Maximum Capacity, March to the Arch, Turning Over a New Rob, Holy Cross College High School, Harnessing Our Inner Chu, Brrreakdown, "Less Poncho, More Feeling," Off We Go... to Ramapo??, Dancin' in the Street, Dancin' in the Street, Stop and Watch the Ivy Grow, Dressed to Impress, Foster-Care Rockin', Thus Always to Tyrants, Oh Doctor Riley Going Far Away, [Intentionally Left Blank], Trashy Monkeys, Cool Beans Cool Beans, Enthusiasm Excitement Eviction, Fauci Force Zooming, Wooden Nickel Refusing "Goodtime" Marching Band

== Music ==
Music performed at games includes a wide variety of classic pep band songs, and some HCMB original arrangements. Favorite pep band songs include "Build Me Up Buttercup", "Holiday", "Runaway Baby", "Chameleon", and "Sweet Caroline", but the whole repertoire consists of some 30+ songs, with dozens more out of current rotation.

The field show is the highlight of the Marching Band season. Field shows generally include three to five songs with a uniting theme. Some recent halftime shows include:

- "Back in Time" (Treasure by Bruno Mars, We Didn't Start the Fire and Piano Man by Billy Joel, Dancing Queen by ABBA, and Sir Duke and Superstition by Stevie Wonder.).
- "Queen" (Fat Bottomed Girls, Under Pressue, and Don't Stop Me Now by Queen)
- "1-7-5" (One Way or Another by Blondie, Seven Nation Army by the White Stripes, and excerpts from Beethoven's Fifth Symphony),
- "80s New Wave" (Take On Me by a-ha, Call Me by Blondie, and Mr. Roboto by Styx),
- "Foo Fighters" (Everlong, Learn to Fly, and The Pretender by Foo Fighters),

== Bettertime Pep Band ==
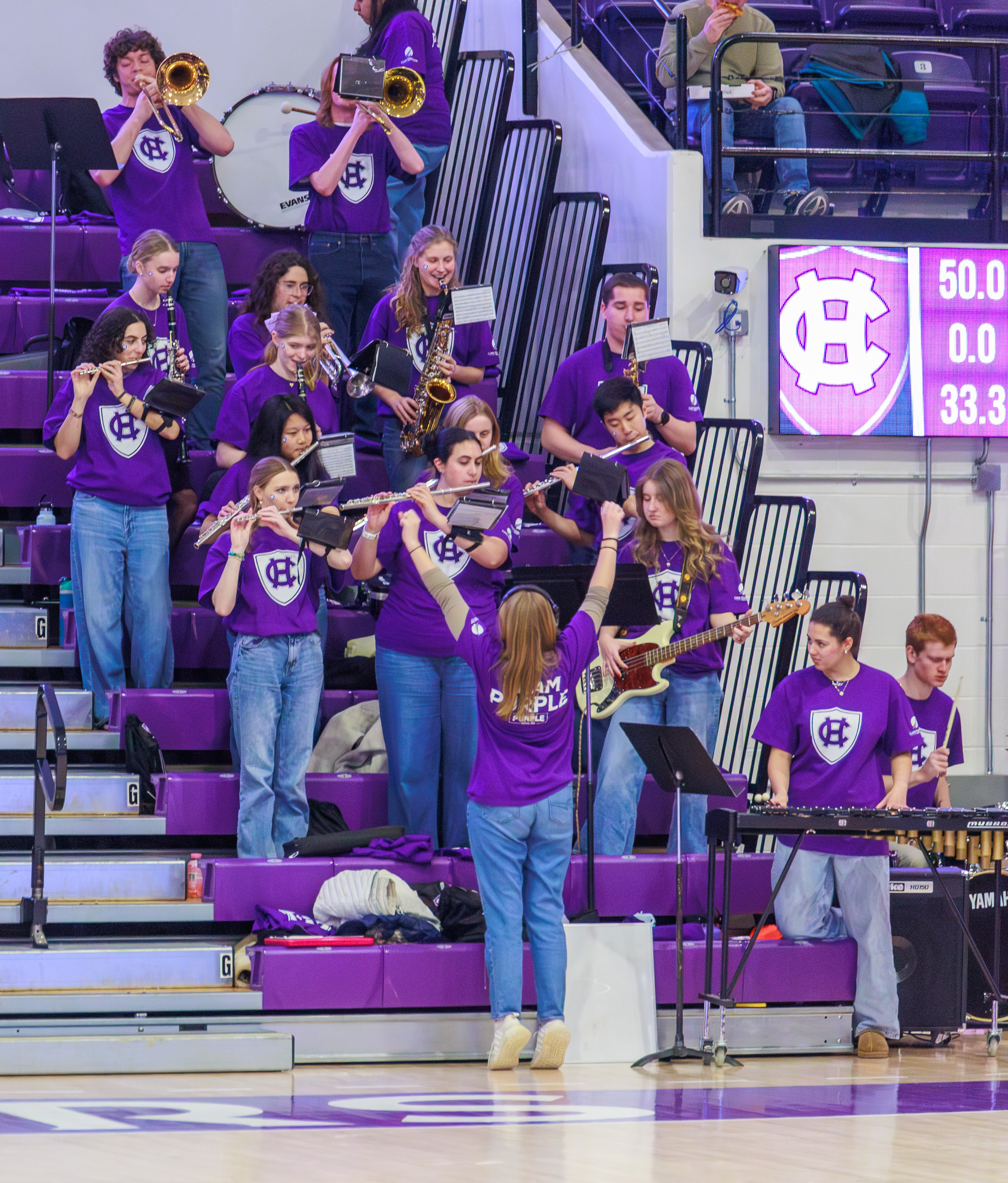
The Bettertime Pep Band at a home basketball game

During the spring semester, many marchers trade in their uniforms for purple athletic polos and transform into the Holy Cross Bettertime Pep Band. The band attends the men's and women's basketball games played at Holy Cross, as well as select men's and women's hockey games.

The Boston College Eagles are the Crusaders' traditional athletic rivals while fellow Patriot League members including American University and Bucknell University are its modern rivals. Following Holy Cross's victory in the 2024 Patriot League Women's Basketball Tournament, the Bettertime Pep Band traveled to Iowa City, Iowa, for a March Madness matchup against the University of Iowa and superstar Caitlin Clark. Past trips have included Columbus, St. Louis, Missouri, Indianapolis, Indiana, Raleigh, and College Park, Maryland. The Goodtime Marching Band traveled to Dayton, Ohio and Spokane, Washington for the 2016 NCAA Division I men's basketball tournament.

== See also ==
- College of the Holy Cross
- Fitton Field
- Hart Center
