= 1987 Columbia Lions football team =

American college football season

1987 Columbia Lions football
- Conference: Ivy League
- Record: 0–10 (0–7 Ivy)
- Head coach: Larry McElreavy (2nd season)
- Defensive coordinator: Bill Narduzzi (2nd season)
- Captain: Mike Bissinger
- Home stadium: Wien Stadium

1987 Ivy League football standings
	Conf.					Overall
Team	W		L		T	W		L		T
Harvard $	6	–	1	–	0	8	–	2	–	0
Brown	5	–	2	–	0	7	–	3	–	0
Yale	5	–	2	–	0	7	–	3	–	0
Princeton	4	–	3	–	0	6	–	4	–	0
Cornell	4	–	3	–	0	5	–	5	–	0
Penn	3	–	4	–	0	4	–	6	–	0
Dartmouth	1	–	6	–	0	2	–	8	–	0
Columbia	0	–	7	–	0	0	–	10	–	0
$ – Conference champion

The 1987 Columbia Lions football team was an American football team that represented Columbia University during the 1987 NCAA Division I-AA football season. Amid a record-setting loss streak, Columbia finished last in the Ivy League.

In their second season under head coach Larry McElreavy, the Lions compiled an 0–10 record and were outscored 311 to 104. Mike Bissinger was the team captain.

The Lions' winless (0–7) conference record was the worst in the Ivy League standings. Columbia was outscored 185 to 67 by Ivy opponents.

By losing all of their games in 1987, the Lions extended a winless streak and a losing streak that began in 1983. The team would later set a Division I record for consecutive games without a win, 47. It would not win or tie another game until October 9, 1988, a win. At the end of 1987, the streak stood at 44 games without a win, and 41 straight losses.

Columbia played its homes games at Lawrence A. Wien Stadium in Upper Manhattan, in New York City.

== Schedule ==
Date	Opponent	Site	Result	Attendance	Source
September 19	Harvard	Wien Stadium; New York, NY	L 0–35	6,449	
September 26	at Lafayette*	Fisher Field; Easton, PA	L 7–38	9,100	
October 3	Penn	Wien Stadium; New York, NY	L 0–23	4,150	
October 10	at Princeton	Palmer Stadium; Princeton, NJ	L 8–38	11,247	
October 17	Yale^{†}	Wien Stadium; New York, NY	L 13–27	7,750	
October 24	at Bucknell*	Memorial Stadium; Lewisburg, PA	L 20–62	7,330	
October 31	Lehigh*	Wien Stadium; New York, NY	L 10–26	3,415	
November 7	Dartmouth	Wien Stadium; New York, NY	L 10–12	6,875	
November 14	at Cornell	Schoellkopf Field; Ithaca, NY (rivalry)	L 20–31	7,500	
November 21	at Brown	Brown Stadium; Providence, RI	L 16–19	27,050	
*Non-conference game; ^{†}Homecoming

== Roster ==
1987 Columbia Lions football team roster
Players
Coaches
Offense

Pos.	#	Name	Class
WR	22	Terry Brown	Jr
FB	32	Chris Konovaichik	So
TE	9	Matt Less	So
C	59	John Miller	Sr
RB	11	Chris Della Pietra	Jr
QB	13	David Putelo	Sr

Defense

Pos.	#	Name	Class
DE	96	John Robinson	Sr
DT	65	Matt Sodi	Sr

Special teams

Pos.	#	Name	Class
K	16	Kurt Dasbach	Sr

Head coach

- Larry McElreavy

Coordinators/assistant coaches

Legend

- (C) Team captain
- (S) Suspended
- (I) Ineligible
- Injured
- Redshirt
