= Larry McElreavy =

American football player and coach (born 1946)

Biographical details
- Born: September 25, 1946 (age 80); Claremont, New Hampshire, U.S.

Playing career
- 1966–1969: New Hampshire

Coaching career (HC unless noted)
- 1975–1979: Yale (OL)
- 1980–1983: Penn (OC)
- 1983–1985: New Haven
- 1986–1988: Columbia

Head coaching record
- Overall: 14–46

Larry Brian McElreavy (born September 25, 1946) is an American former football player and coach. From 1983 to 1985 he led the New Haven Chargers, going 12–18. From 1986 to 1988 he was head coach at Columbia University (the Lions), going 2–28. McElreavy resigned following the 1988 season and finished his head coaching career with an overall record of 14–46.

After leaving coaching, McElreavy went into the real estate business. He currently works as a car salesman in Bellows Falls, Vermont.

== Head coaching record ==
Year	Team	Overall	Conference	Standing	Bowl/playoffs
New Haven Chargers (NCAA Division II independent) (1983–1985)
1983	New Haven	1–9			
1984	New Haven	5–5			
1985	New Haven	6–4			
New Haven:		12–18			
Columbia Lions (Ivy League) (1986–1988)
1986	Columbia	0–10	0–7	8th	
1987	Columbia	0–10	0–7	8th	
1988	Columbia	2–8	2–5	T–6th	
Columbia:		2–28	2–19		
Total:		14–46			
