= Hart Center at the Luth Athletics Complex =

Athletic center at the College of the Holy Cross in Massachusetts, US

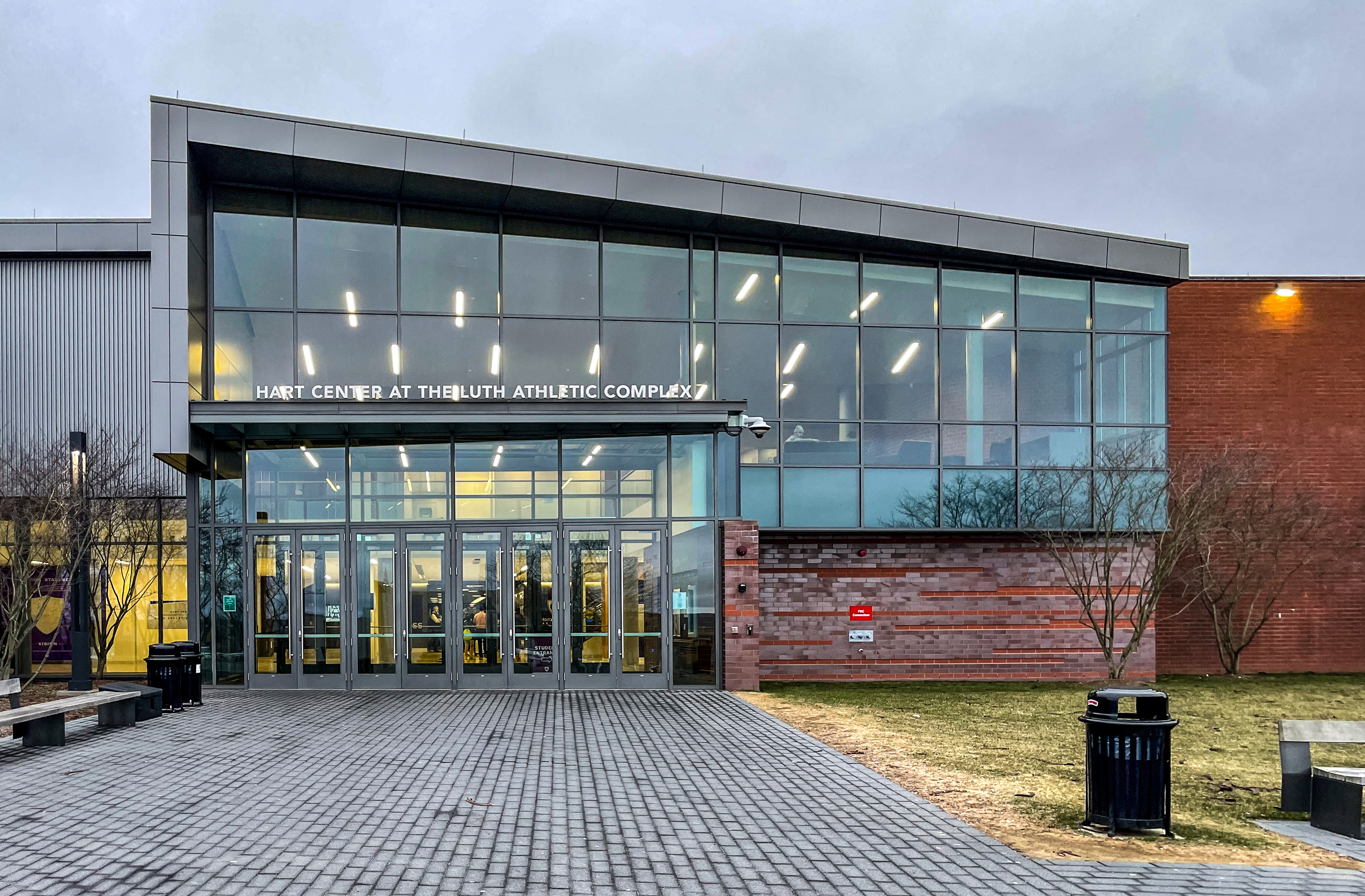
- Interactive map of Hart Center at the Luth Athletics Complex
- Location: 1 College Street; Worcester, MA 01610
- Coordinates: 42.235046°N 71.806381°W
- Owner: College of the Holy Cross
- Operator: College of the Holy Cross
- Capacity: 3,536 (basketball); 1,600 (hockey)
- Surface: 200' x 85' (ice arena)

Construction
- Opened: December 1, 1975

Tenant
- Holy Cross Crusaders Athletics

Hart Center

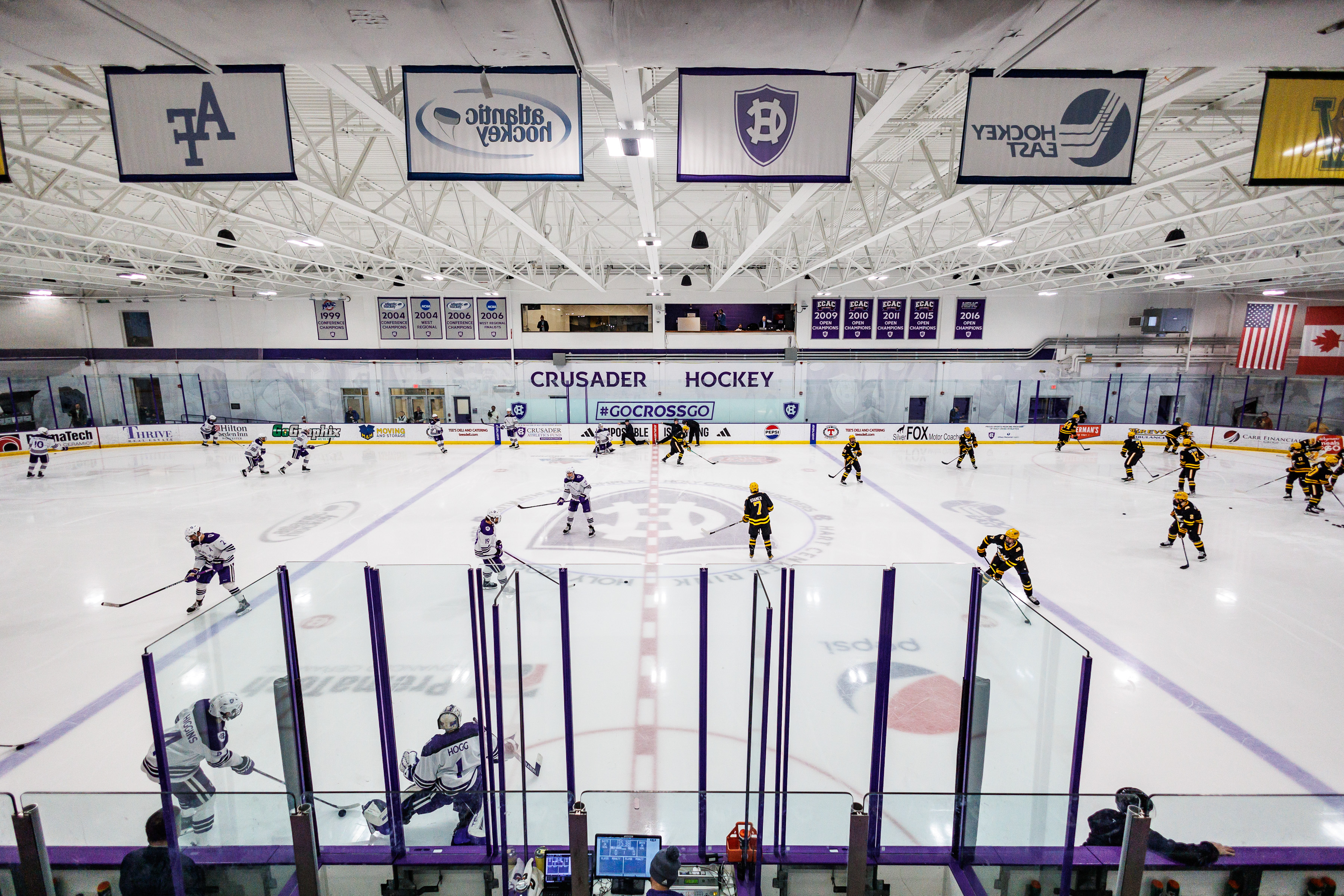
Hockey rink

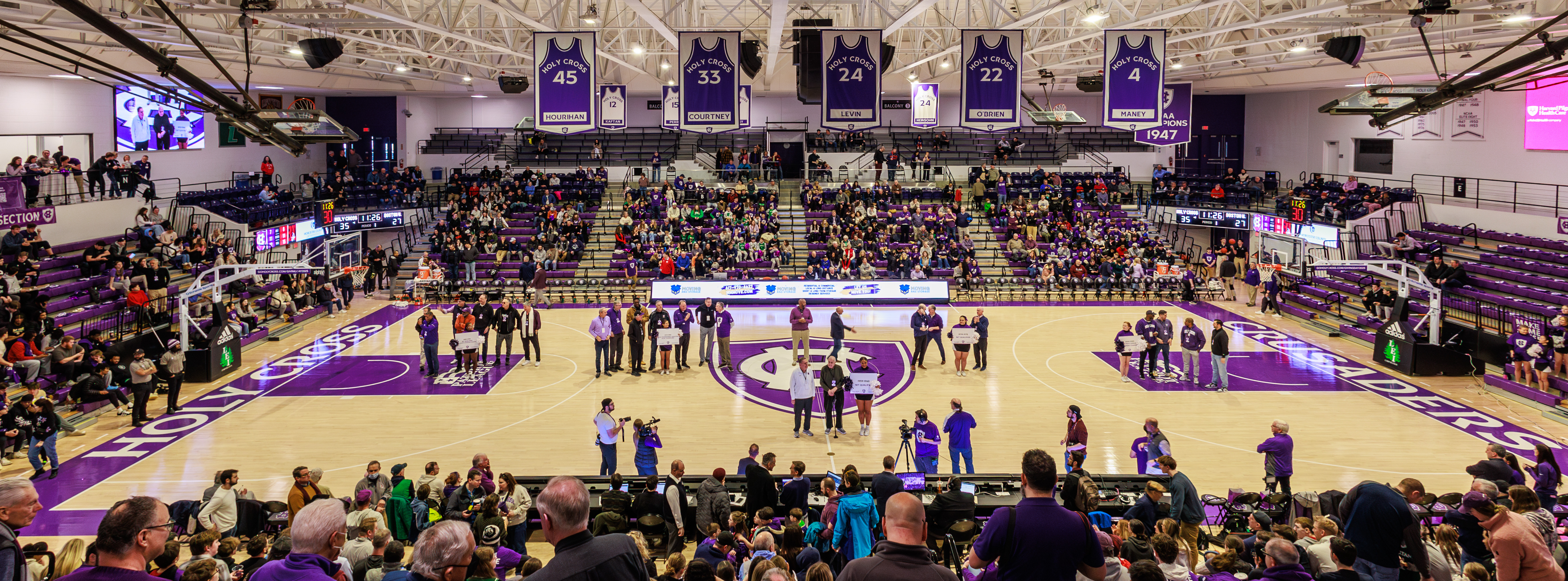
Basketball court

Hart Center at the Luth Athletic Complex is the main athletic center at the College of the Holy Cross in Worcester, Massachusetts. It was built in 1975 and is home to the Holy Cross Crusaders athletic teams.

== Description ==
The center is named for the Rev. Francis J. Hart, S.J., the guiding force behind intramurals at Holy Cross for more than 40 years, as well as John E. Luth '74 and Joanne Chouinard-Luth, who donated $32.5 million to the College in 2015 towards renovating and expanding the athletics complex. John E. Luth is the founding partner, chairman and chief executive officer of Seabury Group LLC, the preeminent global aviation advisory firm. Dr. Joanne Chouinard-Luth practiced dental medicine in Chicago for 30 years.

The Hart Center arena seats 3,536 for basketball, and is the home for the Holy Cross men's and women's basketball teams as well as the college's volleyball team. It has hosted the Patriot League men's basketball tournament numerous times. The hockey rink seats 1,600 and hosts the Division I men's hockey team and the Division I women's hockey team, which was formed in 1998. The rink also was the site of the 1999 and 2002 MAAC hockey championships. The whole complex also contains a 64,000-square-foot (5,900 m^{2}) practice facility with 100 yards of turf, an auxiliary gym for basketball and volleyball practice, a swimming pool, rowing tanks, racquetball & squash courts, a varsity strength and conditioning gym, and locker rooms and offices for all programs.

In late 2015, Holy Cross announced that it had raised the necessary two-thirds of the estimated construction costs for the expansion and renovation of the Hart Center. Construction began in early 2016 and the Luth Athletic Complex was opened in April 2018.

== See also ==
- List of NCAA Division I basketball arenas
