= 1987 NCAA Division I-AA Football Championship Game =

College football game

1987 NCAA Division I-AA Football Championship
- I-AA National Championship Game
Marshall Thundering Herd	Northeast Louisiana Indians
(10–4)	(12–2)
SoCon	Southland
42	43
Head coach: George Chaump	Head coach: Pat Collins
NCAA / Seed; 14 / –	NCAA / Seed; 3 / 2
	1	2	3	4	Total
Marshall	3	10	29	0	42
Northeast Louisiana	7	14	7	15	43
- Date: December 19, 1987
- Season: 1987
- Stadium: Minidome
- Location: Pocatello, Idaho
- Attendance: 11,513

United States TV coverage
- Network: ESPN
- Announcers: Denny Schreiner (play-by-play), Stan White (color)

The 1987 NCAA Division I-AA Football Championship Game was a postseason college football game between the Northeast Louisiana Indians (now the Louisiana–Monroe Warhawks) and the Marshall Thundering Herd. The game was played on December 19, 1987, at the Minidome (now known as Holt Arena) in Pocatello, Idaho. The culminating game of the 1987 NCAA Division I-AA football season, it was won by Northeast Louisiana, 43–42.

== Teams ==
The participants of the Championship Game were the finalists of the 1987 I-AA Playoffs, which began with a 16-team bracket.

=== Northeast Louisiana Indians ===
Northeast Louisiana finished their regular season with a 9–2 record (6–0 in conference); one of their losses was to the Ragin' Cajuns of the then University of Southwestern Louisiana, a Division I-A program. Ranked third in the final NCAA I-AA in-house poll and seeded second in the tournament, the Indians defeated North Texas State, Eastern Kentucky, and third-seed Northern Iowa to reach the final. This was the first appearance for Northeast Louisiana in a Division I-AA championship game.

=== Marshall Thundering Herd ===
Marshall finished their regular season with a 7–4 record (4–2 in conference); one of their losses was to Ohio of Division I-A. Ranked 14th in the final NCAA I-AA in-house poll and unseeded in the tournament, the Thundering Herd defeated James Madison, Weber State, and top-seed Appalachian State to reach the final. This was also the first appearance for Marshall in a Division I-AA championship game.

== Game summary ==
=== Scoring summary ===
Scoring summary

Quarter	Time	Drive			Team	Scoring information	Score	
Quarter	Time	Plays	Yards	TOP	Team	Scoring information	MU	NLU
1					NLU	Henry “Cisco” Richard 15-yard touchdown run, Teddy Garcia kick good	0	7
1					MU	33-yard field goal by Brian Mitchell	3	7
2					MU	Keith Baxter 9-yard touchdown reception from Tony Petersen, Mitchell kick good	10	7
2					NLU	Richard 7-yard touchdown run, Garcia kick good	10	14
2					MU	31-yard field goal by Mitchell	13	14
2					NLU	Mike Manzullo 5-yard touchdown reception from Stan Humphries, Garcia kick good	13	21
3					MU	Michael Barber 9-yard touchdown reception from Petersen, 2-point pass failed	19	21
3					MU	Baxter 29-yard touchdown reception from Peterson, 2-point pass good (Bruce Hammond from Peterson)	27	21
3					NLU	Chris Jones 9-yard touchdown reception from Humphries, Garcia kick good	27	28
3					MU	Hammond 17-yard touchdown reception from Petersen, 2-point pass good (Sean Doctor from Peterson)	35	28
3	0:36				MU	Ronald Darby 6-yard touchdown run, Mitchell kick good	42	28
4	13:34		74		NLU	Kenneth Johnson 10-yard touchdown reception from Humphries, 2-point pass good (Jackie Harris from Humphries)	42	36
4	7:19		80	3:52	NLU	Humphries 3-yard touchdown run, Garcia kick good	42	43
"TOP" = time of possession. For other American football terms, see Glossary of American football.							42	43

=== Game statistics ===
	1	2	3	4	Total
Thundering Herd	3	10	29	0	42
Indians	7	14	7	15	43

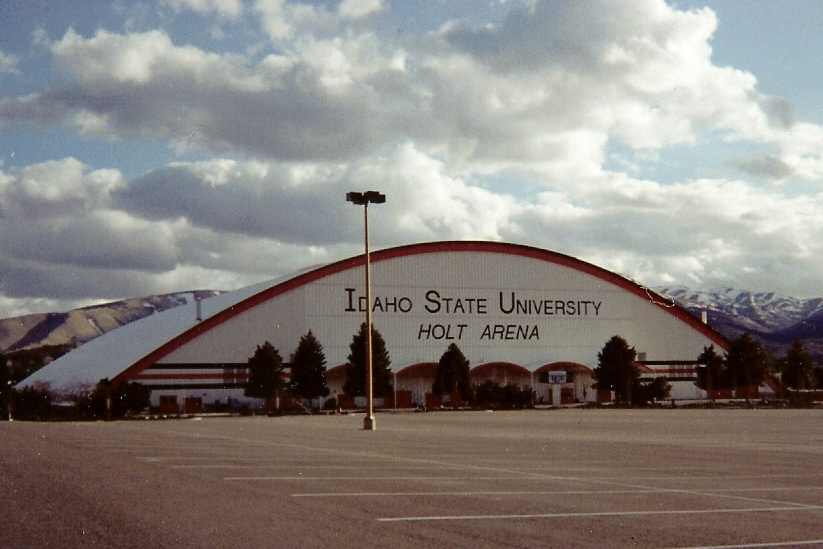
Minidome, now Holt Arena, site of the 1987 Division I-AA championship game

Statistics	MU	NLU
First downs	28	28
Plays–yards	85–576	85–570
Rushes–yards	31–102	42–134
Passing yards	474	436
Passing: comp–att–int	28–54–3	26–43–0
Time of possession	28:55	31:05

Team	Category	Player	Statistics
Marshall	Passing	Tony Petersen	28–54, 474 yds, 4 TD, 3 INT
Marshall	Rushing	Ronald Darby	24 car, 136 yds, 1 TD
Marshall	Receiving	Michael Barber	9 rec, 195 yds, 1 TD
Northeast Louisiana	Passing	Stan Humphries	26–43, 436 yds, 3 TD
Northeast Louisiana	Rushing	Henry “Cisco” Richard	15 car, 77 yds, 2 TD
Northeast Louisiana	Receiving	Mike Manzullo	7 rec, 101 yds, 1 TD
