= 1987 Southern Illinois Salukis football team =

American college football season

1987 Southern Illinois Salukis football
- Conference: Gateway Collegiate Athletic Conference
- Record: 3–8 (2–4 GCAC)
- Head coach: Ray Dorr (3rd season)
- Home stadium: McAndrew Stadium

1987 Gateway Collegiate Athletic Conference football standings
	Conf.					Overall
Team	W		L		T	W		L		T
No. 4 Northern Iowa $^	6	–	0	–	0	10	–	4	–	0
Western Illinois	5	–	1	–	0	7	–	4	–	0
Eastern Illinois	3	–	3	–	0	5	–	6	–	0
SW Missouri State	3	–	3	–	0	5	–	6	–	0
Indiana State	2	–	4	–	0	5	–	6	–	0
Southern Illinois	2	–	4	–	0	3	–	8	–	0
Illinois State	0	–	6	–	0	3	–	7	–	0
$ – Conference champion; ^ – NCAA Division I-AA playoff participant; Rankings from NCAA Division I-AA Football Committee poll

The 1987 Southern Illinois Salukis football team was an American football team that represented Southern Illinois University (now known as Southern Illinois University Carbondale) in the Gateway Collegiate Athletic Conference (GCAC) during the 1987 NCAA Division I-AA football season. Under third-year head coach Ray Dorr, the team compiled a 3–8 record (2–4 against conference opponents) and tied for fifth place in the conference. The team played its home games at McAndrew Stadium in Carbondale, Illinois.

== Schedule ==
Date	Time	Opponent	Site	Result	Attendance	Source
September 5		Delta State*	McAndrew Stadium; Carbondale, IL	L 16–24	10,200	
September 12		Southwest Missouri State	McAndrew Stadium; Carbondale, IL	L 13–18	13,100	
September 19		at Austin Peay*	Municipal Stadium; Clarksville, TN	W 10–3	4,913	
September 26		Illinois State	McAndrew Stadium; Carbondale, IL	W 38–7	13,500	
October 3		at Kansas*	Memorial Stadium; Lawrence, KS	L 15–16	20,500	
October 10		at Fresno State*	Bulldog Stadium; Fresno, CA	L 0–35	34,523	
October 17		No. 9 Western Illinois	McAndrew Stadium; Carbondale, IL	L 15–21	13,325	
October 24		No. 17 Arkansas State*	McAndrew Stadium; Carbondale, IL	L 9–33	5,800	
October 31		at Indiana State	Memorial Stadium; Terre Haute, IN	L 15–24	10,531	
November 7		at Eastern Illinois	O'Brien Field; Charleston, IL	W 32–27	11,485	
November 14	7:00 p.m.	at No. 5 Northern Iowa	UNI-Dome; Cedar Falls, IA	L 3–20	11,813	
*Non-conference game; Rankings from NCAA Division I-AA Football Committee Poll released prior to the game; All times are in Central time

== Roster ==
1987 Southern Illinois Salukis football team roster
Players
Coaches
Offense

Pos.	#	Name	Class
WR	88	Brian Bradley	Jr
TE	82	Randy Brave	So
QB	9	Kevin Brown	Jr
WR	2	Joe Cook	Jr
QB	--	Pat King	Sr
OT	--	Dave Smith	Sr

Defense

Pos.	#	Name	Class
FS	13	Charlie Bell	Sr
LB	47	Jimmy Burnette	Sr
LB	45	Mike Carbonaro	Sr
SS	--	Bobby McNabb	Sr

Special teams

Pos.	#	Name	Class
K	14	John Brda	Sr

Head coach

- Ray Dorr

Coordinators/assistant coaches

- Charlie Strong (WR)

Legend

- (C) Team captain
- (S) Suspended
- (I) Ineligible
- Injured
- Redshirt
