= 1987 Southwest Texas State Bobcats football team =

American college football season

1987 Southwest Texas State Bobcats football
- Conference: Southland Conference
- Record: 4–7 (2–4 SLC)
- Head coach: John O'Hara (5th season)
- Home stadium: Bobcat Stadium

1987 Southland Conference football standings
	Conf.					Overall
Team	W		L		T	W		L		T
No. 3 Northeast Louisiana $^	6	–	0	–	0	13	–	2	–	0
No. 19 Sam Houston State	5	–	1	–	0	8	–	3	–	0
No. 16 North Texas State ^	5	–	1	–	0	7	–	5	–	0
Northwestern State	3	–	3	–	0	6	–	5	–	0
SW Texas State	2	–	4	–	0	4	–	7	–	0
Stephen F. Austin	1	–	5	–	0	3	–	7	–	1
McNeese State	1	–	5	–	0	2	–	9	–	0
$ – Conference champion; ^ – NCAA Division I-AA playoff participant; Northeast Louisiana's games against Louisiana Tech and Arkansas State, Sam Houston State's games against Texas Southern and Western Illinois, Stephen F. Austin's game against Nicholls State, and McNeese State's game against Louisiana Tech counted in the conference standings.; Rankings from NCAA Division I-AA Football Committee poll

The 1987 Southwest Texas State Bobcats football team was an American football team that represented Southwest Texas State University (now known as Texas State University) during the 1987 NCAA Division I-AA football season as a member of the Southland Conference (SLC). In their fifth year under head coach John O'Hara, the team compiled an overall record of 4–7 with a mark of 2–4 in conference play.

== Schedule ==
Date	Opponent	Site	Result	Attendance	Source
September 5	Texas A&I*	Bobcat Stadium; San Marcos, TX	L 0–20		
September 12	at No. 5 North Texas State	Fouts Field; Denton, TX	L 3–20	14,480	
September 19	No. 8 Northeast Louisiana	Bobcat Stadium; San Marcos, TX	L 7–44		
September 26	at Rice*	Rice Stadium; Houston, TX	L 26–38		
October 10	at Baylor*	Baylor Stadium; Waco, TX	L 15–36	21,739	
October 17	Northwestern State	Bobcat Stadium; San Marcos, TX	L 21–24	6,223	
October 24	at Nicholls State*	John L. Guidry Stadium; Thibodaux, LA (rivalry)	W 31–16		
October 31	Lamar*	Bobcat Stadium; San Marcos, TX	W 27–19	9,160	
November 7	at McNeese State	Cowboy Stadium; Lake Charles, LA	W 26–10		
November 14	at Stephen F. Austin	Homer Bryce Stadium; Nacogdoches, TX	W 7–3		
November 21	No. 16 Sam Houston State	Bobcat Stadium; San Marcos, TX (rivalry)	L 21–24		
*Non-conference game; Rankings from NCAA Division I-AA Football Committee Poll released prior to the game
