= 1987 Northwestern State Demons football team =

American college football season

1987 Northwestern State Demons football
- Conference: Southland Conference
- Record: 6–5 (3–3 Southland)
- Head coach: Sam Goodwin (5th season)
- Home stadium: Harry Turpin Stadium

1987 Southland Conference football standings
	Conf.					Overall
Team	W		L		T	W		L		T
No. 3 Northeast Louisiana $^	6	–	0	–	0	13	–	2	–	0
No. 19 Sam Houston State	5	–	1	–	0	8	–	3	–	0
No. 16 North Texas State ^	5	–	1	–	0	7	–	5	–	0
Northwestern State	3	–	3	–	0	6	–	5	–	0
SW Texas State	2	–	4	–	0	4	–	7	–	0
Stephen F. Austin	1	–	5	–	0	3	–	7	–	1
McNeese State	1	–	5	–	0	2	–	9	–	0
$ – Conference champion; ^ – NCAA Division I-AA playoff participant; Northeast Louisiana's games against Louisiana Tech and Arkansas State, Sam Houston State's games against Texas Southern and Western Illinois, Stephen F. Austin's game against Nicholls State, and McNeese State's game against Louisiana Tech counted in the conference standings.; Rankings from NCAA Division I-AA Football Committee poll

The 1987 Northwestern State Demons football team was an American football team that represented Northwestern State University as a member of the Southland Conference during the 1987 NCAA Division I-AA football season. In their fifth year under head coach Sam Goodwin, the team compiled an overall record of 6–5, with a mark of 3–3 in conference play, and finished fourth in the Southland.

== Schedule ==
Date	Opponent	Rank	Site	Result	Attendance	Source
September 5	at No. 2 Arkansas State*		Indian Stadium; Jonesboro, AR	W 23–20	17,114	
September 12	McNeese State		Harry Turpin Stadium; Natchitoches, LA (rivalry)	W 39–3		
September 19	No. 13 North Texas State	No. 4	Harry Turpin Stadium; Natchitoches, LA	L 13–15	11,100	
October 3	No. 2 Northeast Louisiana	No. 8	Harry Turpin Stadium; Natchitoches, LA (rivalry)	L 31–33		
October 10	at Southwestern Louisiana*	No. 20	Cajun Field; Lafayette, LA	L 3–13	19,502	
October 17	at Southwest Texas State		Bobcat Stadium; San Marcos, TX	W 24–21	6,223	
October 24	vs. Louisiana Tech*		Independence Stadium; Shreveport, LA (rivalry)	L 0–23	15,232	
October 31	at Sam Houston State		Bowers Stadium; Huntsville, TX	L 7–34	10,150	
November 7	at Nicholls State*		John L. Guidry Stadium; Thibodaux, LA (rivalry)	W 31–28		
November 14	No. 4 Jackson State*		Harry Turpin Stadium; Natchitoches, LA	W 26–24		
November 21	Stephen F. Austin		Harry Turpin Stadium; Natchitoches, LA (rivalry)	W 33–21		
*Non-conference game; Rankings from NCAA Division I-AA Football Committee Poll released prior to the game
