= 1987 North Texas State Mean Green football team =

American college football season

1987 North Texas State Mean Green football

NCAA Division I-AA First Round, L 9–30 vs. Northeast Louisiana
- Conference: Southland Conference
- Record: 7–5 (5–1 Southland)
- Head coach: Corky Nelson (6th season)
- Home stadium: Fouts Field

1987 Southland Conference football standings
	Conf.					Overall
Team	W		L		T	W		L		T
No. 3 Northeast Louisiana $^	6	–	0	–	0	13	–	2	–	0
No. 19 Sam Houston State	5	–	1	–	0	8	–	3	–	0
No. 16 North Texas State ^	5	–	1	–	0	7	–	5	–	0
Northwestern State	3	–	3	–	0	6	–	5	–	0
SW Texas State	2	–	4	–	0	4	–	7	–	0
Stephen F. Austin	1	–	5	–	0	3	–	7	–	1
McNeese State	1	–	5	–	0	2	–	9	–	0
$ – Conference champion; ^ – NCAA Division I-AA playoff participant; Northeast Louisiana's games against Louisiana Tech and Arkansas State, Sam Houston State's games against Texas Southern and Western Illinois, Stephen F. Austin's game against Nicholls State, and McNeese State's game against Louisiana Tech counted in the conference standings.; Rankings from NCAA Division I-AA Football Committee poll

The 1987 North Texas State Mean Green football team was an American football team that represented North Texas State University (now known as the University of North Texas) during the 1987 NCAA Division I-AA football season as a member of the Southland Conference. In their sixth year under head coach Corky Nelson, the team compiled a 7–5 record.

== Schedule ==
Date	Opponent	Rank	Site	Result	Attendance	Source
September 5	at No. 1 (I-A) Oklahoma*		Oklahoma Memorial Stadium; Norman, OK	L 14–69	75,004	
September 12	Southwest Texas State		Fouts Field; Denton, TX	W 20–3	14,480	
September 19	at Northwestern State	No. 13	Harry Turpin Stadium; Natchitoches, LA	W 15–13	11,100	
September 26	at McNeese State	No. 7	Cowboy Stadium; Lake Charles, LA	W 38–16		
October 3	Abilene Christian*	No. 5	Fouts Field; Denton, TX	W 26–3		
October 10	Sam Houston State^{†}	No. 3	Fouts Field; Denton, TX	W 41–24		
October 17	at TCU*	No. 2	Amon G. Carter Stadium; Fort Worth, TX	L 10–19	23,291	
October 31	at Stephen F. Austin	No. 5	Homer Bryce Stadium; Nacogdoches, TX	W 16–14		
November 7	at No. 15 Arkansas State*	No. 4	Indian Stadium; Jonesboro, AR	L 20–27		
November 14	at No. 3 Northeast Louisiana	No. 12	Malone Stadium; Monroe, LA	L 23–24		
November 21	Louisiana Tech*	No. 21	Fouts Field; Denton, TX	W 10–5	8,125	
November 28	at No. 3 Northeast Louisiana*	No. 16	Malone Stadium; Monroe, LA (NCAA Division I-AA First Round)	L 9–30		
*Non-conference game; ^{†}Homecoming; Rankings from NCAA Division I-AA Football Committee Poll released prior to the game
