= 1987 McNeese State Cowboys football team =

American college football season

1987 McNeese State Cowboys football
- Conference: Southland Conference
- Record: 2–9 (1–5 Southland)
- Head coach: Sonny Jackson (1st season)
- Home stadium: Cowboy Stadium

1987 Southland Conference football standings
	Conf.					Overall
Team	W		L		T	W		L		T
No. 3 Northeast Louisiana $^	6	–	0	–	0	13	–	2	–	0
No. 19 Sam Houston State	5	–	1	–	0	8	–	3	–	0
No. 16 North Texas State ^	5	–	1	–	0	7	–	5	–	0
Northwestern State	3	–	3	–	0	6	–	5	–	0
SW Texas State	2	–	4	–	0	4	–	7	–	0
Stephen F. Austin	1	–	5	–	0	3	–	7	–	1
McNeese State	1	–	5	–	0	2	–	9	–	0
$ – Conference champion; ^ – NCAA Division I-AA playoff participant; Northeast Louisiana's games against Louisiana Tech and Arkansas State, Sam Houston State's games against Texas Southern and Western Illinois, Stephen F. Austin's game against Nicholls State, and McNeese State's game against Louisiana Tech counted in the conference standings.; Rankings from NCAA Division I-AA Football Committee poll

The 1987 McNeese State Cowboys football team was an American football team that represented McNeese State University as a member of the Southland Conference (Southland) during the 1987 NCAA Division I-AA football season. In their first year under head coach Sonny Jackson, the team compiled an overall record of 2–9, with a mark of 1–5 in conference play, and finished tied for sixth in the Southland.

== Schedule ==
Date	Time	Opponent	Site	Result	Attendance	Source
September 5		Northern Iowa*	Cowboy Stadium; Lake Charles, LA	L 31–34	18,500	
September 12		at Northwestern State	Harry Turpin Stadium; Natchitoches, LA (rivalry)	L 3–39		
September 19		Stephen F. Austin	Cowboy Stadium; Lake Charles, LA	W 20–8		
September 26		No. 7 North Texas State	Cowboy Stadium; Lake Charles, LA	L 16–38		
October 3		Arkansas State*	Cowboy Stadium; Lake Charles, LA	L 0–17		
October 10	1:30 p.m.	at Louisiana Tech (Note: McNeese State's game against Louisiana Tech was a designated conference game and counted in the Southland standings.)	Joe Aillet Stadium; Ruston, LA	L 3–7	16,300	
October 24		at New Mexico State*	Aggie Memorial Stadium; Las Cruces, NM	L 13–32	7,861	
October 31		at No. 9 Northeast Louisiana	Malone Stadium; Monroe, LA	L 10–37		
November 7		Southwest Texas State	Cowboy Stadium; Lake Charles, LA	L 10–26		
November 14		Nicholls State*	Cowboy Stadium; Lake Charles, LA	L 7–29		
November 21		at Lamar*	Cardinal Stadium; Beaumont, TX (rivalry)	W 44–36	3,259	
*Non-conference game; Rankings from NCAA Division I-AA Football Committee Poll released prior to the game; All times are in Central time
