= 1987 Northeast Louisiana Indians football team =

American college football season

1987 Northeast Louisiana Indians football

NCAA Division I-AA champion SLC champion

Division I-AA Championship Game, W 43–42 vs. Marshall
- Conference: Southland Conference
- Record: 13–2 (6–0 SLC)
- Head coach: Pat Collins (7th season)
- Home stadium: Malone Stadium

1987 Southland Conference football standings
	Conf.					Overall
Team	W		L		T	W		L		T
No. 3 Northeast Louisiana $^	6	–	0	–	0	13	–	2	–	0
No. 19 Sam Houston State	5	–	1	–	0	8	–	3	–	0
No. 16 North Texas State ^	5	–	1	–	0	7	–	5	–	0
Northwestern State	3	–	3	–	0	6	–	5	–	0
SW Texas State	2	–	4	–	0	4	–	7	–	0
Stephen F. Austin	1	–	5	–	0	3	–	7	–	1
McNeese State	1	–	5	–	0	2	–	9	–	0
$ – Conference champion; ^ – NCAA Division I-AA playoff participant; Northeast Louisiana's games against Louisiana Tech and Arkansas State, Sam Houston State's games against Texas Southern and Western Illinois, Stephen F. Austin's game against Nicholls State, and McNeese State's game against Louisiana Tech counted in the conference standings.; Rankings from NCAA Division I-AA Football Committee poll

The 1987 Northeast Louisiana Indians football team represented Northeast Louisiana University (now known as the University of Louisiana at Monroe) as a member of the Southland Conference (SLC) during the 1987 NCAA Division I-AA football season. Northeast Louisiana played their home games on-campus at Malone Stadium in Monroe, Louisiana. This Indians squad won the 1987 NCAA Division I-AA Football Championship Game.

The Indians were led by seventh-year head coach Pat Collins, and were led by first team All-America Stan Humphries. The squad completed the regular season with an overall record of 9–2 and finished 6–0 to capture their first outright Southland Conference championship. En route to the championship game, NLU defeated North Texas, Eastern Kentucky and Northern Iowa. The Indians faced off against the Marshall Thundering Herd for the I-AA National Championship. In the championship game, Marshall took a 42–28 lead into the fourth quarter only to have Humphries lead the Indians to a pair of late touchdowns and captured the championship with their 43–42 victory.

== Schedule ==
Date	Time	Opponent	Rank	Site	Result	Attendance	Source
September 12	7:00 p.m.	at Louisiana Tech (Note: Northeast Louisiana's games against Louisiana Tech and Arkansas State were designated conference games and counted in the Southland standings.)	No. 16	Joe Aillet Stadium; Ruston, LA (rivalry)	W 44–7	24,975	
September 19		at Southwest Texas State	No. 8	Bobcat Stadium; San Marcos, TX	W 44–7		
September 26		Nicholls State*	No. 3	Malone Stadium; Monroe, LA	W 26–14	19,638	
October 3		at No. 8 Northwestern State	No. 2	Harry Turpin Stadium; Natchitoches, LA (rivalry)	W 33–31		
October 10		at Lamar*	No. 2	Cardinal Stadium; Beaumont, TX	L 28–48		
October 17		No. 8 Georgia Southern*	No. T–6	Malone Stadium; Monroe, LA	W 26–17	17,231	
October 24		Southwestern Louisiana*	No. 3	Malone Stadium; Monroe, LA (rivalry)	L 7–17	18,783	
October 31		McNeese State	No. 9	Malone Stadium; Monroe, LA	W 37–10		
November 7		at Southern Miss*	No. 8	M. M. Roberts Stadium; Hattiesburg, MS	W 34–24	10,123	
November 14		No. 12 North Texas State	No. 3	Malone Stadium; Monroe, LA	W 24–23		
November 21		No. 8 Arkansas State	No. 3	Malone Stadium; Monroe, LA	W 31–21		
November 28		No. 16 North Texas State*	No. 3	Malone Stadium; Monroe, LA (NCAA Division I-AA First Round)	W 30–9		
December 5		No. 7 Eastern Kentucky*	No. 3	Malone Stadium; Monroe, LA (NCAA Division I-AA Quarterfinal)	W 33–32		
December 12		No. 4 Northern Iowa*	No. 3	Malone Stadium; Monroe, LA (NCAA Division I-AA Semifinal)	W 44–41 ^{2OT}	14,443	
December 19		vs. No. 14 Marshall*	No. 3	ASISU Minidome; Pocatello, ID (NCAA Division I-AA Championship Game)	W 43–42	11,513	
*Non-conference game; Rankings from NCAA Division I-AA Football Committee Poll released prior to the game; All times are in Central time

== Team players in the NFL ==
Player	Year	Round	Pick	Position	Club
Teddy Garcia	1988 NFL draft	4	100	Kicker	New England Patriots
Stan Humphries	1988 NFL draft	6	159	Quarterback	Washington Redskins
Jackie Harris	1990 NFL draft	4	102	Tight end	Green Bay Packers
