= 1987 Stephen F. Austin Lumberjacks football team =

American college football season

1987 Stephen F. Austin Lumberjacks football
- Conference: Southland Conference
- Record: 3–7–1 (1–5 Southland)
- Head coach: Jim Hess (6th season)
- Home stadium: Homer Bryce Stadium

1987 Southland Conference football standings
	Conf.					Overall
Team	W		L		T	W		L		T
No. 3 Northeast Louisiana $^	6	–	0	–	0	13	–	2	–	0
No. 19 Sam Houston State	5	–	1	–	0	8	–	3	–	0
No. 16 North Texas State ^	5	–	1	–	0	7	–	5	–	0
Northwestern State	3	–	3	–	0	6	–	5	–	0
SW Texas State	2	–	4	–	0	4	–	7	–	0
Stephen F. Austin	1	–	5	–	0	3	–	7	–	1
McNeese State	1	–	5	–	0	2	–	9	–	0
$ – Conference champion; ^ – NCAA Division I-AA playoff participant; Northeast Louisiana's games against Louisiana Tech and Arkansas State, Sam Houston State's games against Texas Southern and Western Illinois, Stephen F. Austin's game against Nicholls State, and McNeese State's game against Louisiana Tech counted in the conference standings.; Rankings from NCAA Division I-AA Football Committee poll

The 1987 Stephen F. Austin Lumberjacks football team was an American football team that represented Stephen F. Austin State University as a member of the Southland Conference during the 1987 NCAA Division I-AA football season. In their sixth year under head coach Jim Hess, the team compiled an overall record of 3–7–1, with a mark of 1–5 in conference play, and finished tied for sixth in the Southland.

== Schedule ==
Date	Opponent	Site	Result	Attendance	Source
September 5	at West Texas State*	Kimbrough Memorial Stadium; Canyon, TX	W 7–3		
September 12	Prairie View A&M*	Homer Bryce Stadium; Nacogdoches, TX	T 13–13		
September 19	at McNeese State	Cowboy Stadium; Lake Charles, LA	L 8–20		
September 26	at Lamar*	Cardinal Stadium; Beaumont, TX	L 26–28		
October 3	Eastern Washington*	Homer Bryce Stadium; Nacogdoches, TX	L 0–3		
October 17	at No. 15 Nicholls State (Note: Stephen F. Austin's game against Nicholls State was a designated conference game and counted in the Southland standings.)	John L. Guidry Stadium; Thibodaux, LA	W 24–21		
October 24	at Nevada*	Mackay Stadium; Reno, NV	W 9–7	14,577	
October 31	No. 5 North Texas State	Homer Bryce Stadium; Nacogdoches, TX	L 14–16		
November 7	Sam Houston State	Homer Bryce Stadium; Nacogdoches, TX (rivalry)	L 17–31	15,522	
November 14	Southwest Texas State	Homer Bryce Stadium; Nacogdoches, TX	L 3–7		
November 21	at Northwestern State	Harry Turpin Stadium; Natchitoches, LA	L 21–33		
*Non-conference game; Rankings from NCAA Division I-AA Football Committee Poll released prior to the game
