= 1987 Middle Tennessee Blue Raiders football team =

American college football season

1987 Middle Tennessee Blue Raiders football
- Conference: Ohio Valley Conference
- Record: 6–5 (4–2 OVC)
- Head coach: Boots Donnelly (9th season)
- Home stadium: Johnny "Red" Floyd Stadium

1987 Ohio Valley Conference football standings
	Conf.					Overall
Team	W		L		T	W		L		T
No. 7 Eastern Kentucky +^	5	–	1	–	0	9	–	3	–	0
No. 15 Youngstown State +^	5	–	1	–	0	8	–	4	–	0
Middle Tennessee	4	–	2	–	0	6	–	5	–	0
Murray State	3	–	3	–	0	6	–	5	–	0
Tennessee Tech	2	–	4	–	0	5	–	6	–	0
Morehead State	1	–	5	–	0	2	–	8	–	0
Austin Peay	1	–	5	–	0	2	–	9	–	0
+ – Conference co-champions; ^ – NCAA Division I-AA playoff participant; Rankings from NCAA Division I-AA Football Committee poll

The 1987 Middle Tennessee Blue Raiders football team represented Middle Tennessee State University in the 1987 NCAA Division I-AA football season

== Schedule ==
Date	Opponent	Rank	Site	Result	Attendance	Source
September 5	at Tennessee State*		Vanderbilt Stadium; Nashville, TN	W 55–19	30,827	
September 19	at Georgia Southern*	No. 5	Paulson Stadium; Statesboro, GA	L 13–17	4,527	
September 26	at Western Kentucky*	No. 12	L. T. Smith Stadium; Bowling Green, KY (rivalry)	L 16–28	16,500	
October 3	Austin Peay		Johnny "Red" Floyd Stadium; Murfreesboro, TN	W 38–16	11,500	
October 10	vs. Mississippi Valley State*		Liberty Bowl Memorial Stadium; Memphis, TN	W 38–7	2,547	
October 17	No. 4 Eastern Kentucky	No. 20	Johnny "Red" Floyd Stadium; Murfreesboro, TN	W 17–16	11,000	
October 25	Winston-Salem State*	No. 15	Johnny "Red" Floyd Stadium; Murfreesboro, TN	L 8–11	8,000	
October 31	Youngstown State	No. T–20	Johnny "Red" Floyd Stadium; Murfreesboro, TN	L 16–17	13,400	
November 7	at Morehead State		Jayne Stadium; Morehead, KY	L 3–7		
November 14	Murray State		Johnny "Red" Floyd Stadium; Murfreesboro, TN	W 27–9		
November 21	at Tennessee Tech		Tucker Stadium; Cookeville, TN	W 17–13	8,570	
*Non-conference game; Rankings from NCAA Division I-AA Football Committee Poll released prior to the game
