= 1987 Sam Houston State Bearkats football team =

American college football season

1987 Sam Houston State Bearkats football
- Conference: Southland Conference
- Record: 8–3 (5–1 Southland)
- Head coach: Ron Randleman (6th season)
- Home stadium: Bowers Stadium

1987 Southland Conference football standings
| | Conf. | | | | | Overall |
| Team | W | | L | | T | W | | L | | T |
|---|---|---|---|---|---|---|---|---|---|---|
| No. 3 Northeast Louisiana $^ | 6 | – | 0 | – | 0 | 13 | – | 2 | – | 0 |
| No. 19 Sam Houston State | 5 | – | 1 | – | 0 | 8 | – | 3 | – | 0 |
| No. 16 North Texas State ^ | 5 | – | 1 | – | 0 | 7 | – | 5 | – | 0 |
| Northwestern State | 3 | – | 3 | – | 0 | 6 | – | 5 | – | 0 |
| SW Texas State | 2 | – | 4 | – | 0 | 4 | – | 7 | – | 0 |
| Stephen F. Austin | 1 | – | 5 | – | 0 | 3 | – | 7 | – | 1 |
| McNeese State | 1 | – | 5 | – | 0 | 2 | – | 9 | – | 0 |
$ – Conference champion; ^ – NCAA Division I-AA playoff participant; Northeast Louisiana's games against Louisiana Tech and Arkansas State, Sam Houston State's games against Texas Southern and Western Illinois, Stephen F. Austin's game against Nicholls State, and McNeese State's game against Louisiana Tech counted in the conference standings.; Rankings from NCAA Division I-AA Football Committee poll

The 1987 Sam Houston State Bearkats football team represented Sam Houston State University as a member of the Southland Conference during the 1987 NCAA Division I-AA football season. Led by sixth-year head coach Ron Randleman, the Bearkats compiled an overall record of 8–3 with a mark of 5–1 in conference play, and finished tied for second in the Southland.

== Schedule ==
| Date | Opponent | Rank | Site | Result | Attendance | Source |
|---|---|---|---|---|---|---|
| September 5 | at Angelo State* | | San Angelo Stadium; San Angelo, TX | W 31–14 | | |
| September 12 | at Montana State* | No. T–13 | Sales Stadium; Bozeman, MT | L 48–52 | 7,357 | |
| September 19 | Texas A&I* | | Bowers Stadium; Huntsville, TX | W 45–35 | | |
| September 26 | at Houston* | | Houston Astrodome; Houston, TX | L 34–38 | 21,705 | |
| October 3 | Texas Southern (Note: Sam Houston State's games against Texas Southern and Western Illinois were designated conference games and counted in the Southland standings.) | | Bowers Stadium; Huntsville, TX | W 45–7 | | |
| October 10 | at No. 3 North Texas State | | Fouts Field; Denton, TX | L 24–41 | | |
| October 24 | at Lamar* | | Cardinal Stadium; Beaumont, TX | W 34–21 | 7,014 | |
| October 31 | Northwestern State | | Bowers Stadium; Huntsville, TX | W 34–7 | 10,150 | |
| November 7 | at Stephen F. Austin | | Homer Bryce Stadium; Nacogdoches, TX (Battle of the Piney Woods) | W 31–17 | 15,522 | |
| November 14 | No. 19 Western Illinois | No. T–22 | Bowers Stadium; Huntsville, TX | W 42–18 | 5,300 | |
| November 21 | at Southwest Texas State | No. 16 | Bobcat Stadium; San Marcos, TX (rivalry) | W 24–21 | | |
*Non-conference game; Rankings from NCAA Division I-AA Football Committee Poll released prior to the game
