= 1987 Miami Redskins football team =

American college football season

1987 Miami Redskins football
- Conference: Mid-American Conference
- Record: 5–6 (5–3 MAC)
- Head coach: Tim Rose (5th season)
- Home stadium: Yager Stadium

1987 Mid-American Conference football standings
	Conf.					Overall
Team	W		L		T	W		L		T
Eastern Michigan $	7	–	1	–	0	10	–	2	–	0
Kent State	5	–	3	–	0	7	–	4	–	0
Miami (OH)	5	–	3	–	0	5	–	6	–	0
Bowling Green	5	–	3	–	0	5	–	6	–	0
Western Michigan	4	–	4	–	0	5	–	6	–	0
Central Michigan	3	–	4	–	1	5	–	5	–	1
Toledo	3	–	4	–	1	3	–	7	–	1
Ball State	3	–	5	–	0	4	–	7	–	0
Ohio	0	–	8	–	0	1	–	10	–	0
$ – Conference champion

The 1987 Miami Redskins football team was an American football team that represented Miami University in the Mid-American Conference (MAC) during the 1987 NCAA Division I-A football season. In its fifth season under head coach Tim Rose, the team compiled a 5–6 record (5–3 against MAC opponents), finished in a tie for second place in the MAC, and were outscored by all opponents by a combined total of 235 to 180.

The team's statistical leaders included Mike Bates with 2,218 passing yards, Jon Gist with 429 rushing yards, and Andy Schillinger with 574 receiving yards.

== Schedule ==
Date	Opponent	Site	Result	Attendance	Source
September 5	at Central Michigan	Kelly/Shorts Stadium; Mount Pleasant, MI	W 15–6	14,625	
September 12	Eastern Michigan	Yager Stadium; Oxford, OH	L 17–33	17,788	
September 19	at Syracuse*	Carrier Dome; Syracuse, NY	L 10–24	33,838	
September 26	at Cincinnati*	Nippert Stadium; Cincinnati, OH (rivalry)	L 26–31	27,291	
October 3	Ball State	Yager Stadium; Oxford, OH	W 30–20	16,762	
October 10	at Western Michigan	Waldo Stadium; Kalamazoo, MI	W 17–0	13,395	
October 17	Ohio	Yager Stadium; Oxford, OH (rivalry)	W 10–9	27,382	
October 24	at Toledo	Glass Bowl; Toledo, OH	L 25–37	18,485	
October 31	Bowling Green	Yager Stadium; Oxford, OH	W 17–7	22,208	
November 7	at No. 3 Miami (FL)*	Miami Orange Bowl; Miami, FL	L 3–54	40,128	
November 14	at Kent State	Dix Stadium; Kent, OH	L 10–14	12,100	
*Non-conference game; Rankings from AP Poll released prior to the game
