= Dan Simrell =

American football player and coach (born 1943)

Biographical details
- Born: April 9, 1943 (age 83)
- Education: University of Toledo (B.A., 1964; M.S., 1975)

Playing career
- 1962–1964: Toledo
- Positions: Quarterback, safety

Coaching career (HC unless noted)
- 1965: St. Francis de Sales HS (OH) (assistant)
- 1966–1968: Start HS (OH) (assistant)
- 1969–1970: Start HS (OH)
- 1971–1981: Toledo (assistant)
- 1982–1989: Toledo
- 1990: Memphis State (assistant)
- 1991–1994: West Virginia (assistant)
- 1995–1999: West Virginia (OC/QB)
- 2000–2006: Findlay
- 2007–2014: Tri–State / Trine (QB)
- 2015–2019: Olivet (QB)

Head coaching record
- Overall: 81–82–2
- Bowls: 0–1

Accomplishments and honors

Championships
- 1 MAC (1984)

Awards
- MAC Coach of the Year (1984); GLIAC Coach of the Year (2002); Toledo Rockets Hall of Fame (1996); Region 3 Division II Coach of the Year (2002)

Dan Simrell (born April 9, 1943) is an American former college football coach. He was the quarterbacks coach at Olivet College in Olivet, Michigan from 2015 to 2019. Simrell served as the head football coach at the University of Toledo from 1982 to 1989 and at the University of Findlay from 2000 to 2006.

Simrell played collegiately as a quarterback for Toledo. In 1964, he set single-season school records for the Rockets in passing yards (1,239), completions (115) and total offense (1,616). (Note: Broke the previous total offense mark of 1,201 set by Lee Pete in 1947.)

== Head coaching record ==
=== College ===
Year	Team	Overall	Conference	Standing	Bowl/playoffs
Toledo Rockets (Mid-American Conference) (1982–1989)
1982	Toledo	6–5	5–4	T–5th	
1983	Toledo	9–2	7–2	T–2nd	
1984	Toledo	8–3–1	7–1–1	1st	L California
1985	Toledo	4–7	3–6	T–6th	
1986	Toledo	7–4	5–3	T–2nd	
1987	Toledo	3–7–1	3–4–1	T–6th	
1988	Toledo	6–5	4–4	6th	
1989	Toledo	6–5	6–2	T–2nd	
Toledo:		49–38–2	40–26–2		
Findlay Oilers (Great Lakes Intercollegiate Athletic Conference) (2000–2006)
2000	Findlay	2–8	2–8	T–10th	
2001	Findlay	3–8	3–7	T–9th	
2002	Findlay	9–2	8–2	T–2nd	
2003	Findlay	6–5	5–5	T–4th	
2004	Findlay	6–5	5–5	6th	
2005	Findlay	4–7	3–7	T–8th	
2006	Findlay	2–9	1–9	T–11th	
Findlay:		32–44	27–43		
Total:		81–82–2			
National championship Conference title Conference division title or championship game berth
