= George Chaump =

American football player and coach (1936–2019)

Biographical details
- Born: April 28, 1936; Scranton, Pennsylvania, U.S.
- Died: May 19, 2019 (aged 83)

Playing career
- 1957: Bloomsburg

Coaching career (HC unless noted)
- 1961: Shamokin High School
- 1962–1967: Harrisburg HS (PA)
- 1968–1978: Ohio State (assistant)
- 1979–1981: Tampa Bay Buccaneers (assistant)
- 1982–1985: IUP
- 1986–1989: Marshall
- 1990–1994: Navy
- 1997–2001: Central Dauphin HS (PA)
- 2002–2010: Harrisburg HS (PA)
- 2011–2012: Central Dauphin East HS (PA)

Head coaching record
- Overall: 71–73–2 (college); 190–66 (high school)
- Tournaments: 4–2 (NCAA D-I-AA playoffs)

Accomplishments and honors

Championships
- 1 SoCon (1988); 2 PSAC Western Division (1984–1985)

George Chaump (April 28, 1936 – May 19, 2019) was an American football player and coach. He served as head coach at Indiana University of Pennsylvania (1982–1985), Marshall University (1986–1989), and the United States Naval Academy (1990–1994), compiling a career college football record of 71–73–2. In 1987, Chaump led his Marshall Thundering Herd squad to the 1987 NCAA Division I-AA Football Championship Game.

== Coaching career ==
Chaump's football head coaching career began in 1961 at Shamokin High School in Pennsylvania, followed by six seasons at John Harris High School, where his teams went 58–4 in those six seasons.

In 1968, he joined the staff as an assistant coach with Ohio State under Woody Hayes, for whom he coached 11 seasons from 1968 to 1978. This stretch was followed by three years (1979–1981) as an assistant coach in the National Football League with the Tampa Bay Buccaneers under coach John McKay, with the team compiling an overall record of 24–23–1. He left the NFL and served for four seasons as head coach at Indiana University of Pennsylvania from 1982 to 1985, compiling a record of 24-16-1.

From 1986 to 1989, Chaump coached at Marshall, where he compiled a 33–16–1 record. This record includes back-to-back 10-win seasons in 1987 and 1988. From 1990 to 1994, he coached at Navy, where he compiled a 14–41 record.

After leaving Navy, Chaump returned to coaching at Central Dauphin High School in Harrisburg, Pennsylvania, in 1997. He coached the school to a 57–14 record through the 2002 season before taking over the head coaching duties at Harrisburg High School prior to the 2003 season. Chaump's tenure at Harrisburg ended in 2010. For two seasons (2011 and 2012), Chaump then served as head coach of the Central Dauphin East High School football team, posting an 8–13 record. In 23 years as a high school coach, Chaump's record was 190–66.

== Death ==
Chaump died on May 19, 2019.

== Head coaching record ==
=== College ===
| Year | Team | Overall | Conference | Standing | Bowl/playoffs | NCAA Poll^{#} |
|---|---|---|---|---|---|---|
IUP Indians (Pennsylvania State Athletic Conference) (1982–1985)
| 1982 | IUP | 4–6 | 3–3 | T–4th (West) | | |
| 1983 | IUP | 5–5 | 4–2 | T–2nd (West) | | |
| 1984 | IUP | 7–3 | 4–2 | T–1st (West) | | |
| 1985 | IUP | 8–2–1 | 6–0 | 1st (West) | | |
| IUP: | | 24–16–1 | 17–7 | | | |
Marshall Thundering Herd (Southern Conference) (1986–1989)
| 1986 | Marshall | 6–4–1 | 3–3 | 5th | | |
| 1987 | Marshall | 10–5 | 4–2 | 2nd | L NCAA Division I-AA Championship | 14 |
| 1988 | Marshall | 11–2 | 6–1 | T–1st | L NCAA Division I-AA Quarterfinal | 7 |
| 1989 | Marshall | 6–5 | 4–3 | T–3rd | | |
| Marshall: | | 33–16–1 | 17–9 | | | |
Navy Midshipmen (NCAA Division I-A independent) (1990–1994)
| 1990 | Navy | 5–6 | | | | |
| 1991 | Navy | 1–10 | | | | |
| 1992 | Navy | 1–10 | | | | |
| 1993 | Navy | 4–7 | | | | |
| 1994 | Navy | 3–8 | | | | |
| Navy: | | 14–41 | | | | |
| Total: | | 71–73–2 | | | | |
National championship Conference title Conference division title or championship game berth
^{#}Rankings from final NCAA Poll.
