= 1987 Liberty Flames football team =

American college football season

1987 Liberty Flames football
- Conference: Independent
- Record: 3–7
- Head coach: Morgan Hout (4th season)
- Home stadium: City Stadium

1987 NCAA Division II independents football records
	Conf.			Overall
Team	W	L	T	W		L		T
No. 16 New Haven		–		8	–	2	–	0
Saint Mary's		–		8	–	3	–	0
No. 11 UCF ^		–		9	–	4	–	0
Springfield		–		5	–	3	–	1
Central Connecticut		–		4	–	4	–	1
American International		–		3	–	5	–	2
Liberty		–		3	–	7	–	0
Kentucky State		–		2	–	8	–	1
Michigan Tech		–		2	–	7	–	0
Southern Connecticut State		–		1	–	9	–	0
^ – NCAA Division II playoff participant; Rankings from NCAA Division II Football Committee poll

The 1987 Liberty Flames football team represented Liberty University as an independent during the 1987 NCAA Division II football season. Led by fourth-year head coach Morgan Hout, the Flames compiled an overall record of 3–7.

== Schedule ==
Date	Opponent	Site	Result	Attendance	Source
September 5	Edinboro	City Stadium; Lynchburg, VA	W 13–8	5,800	
September 12	at Tennessee Tech	Tucker Stadium; Cookeville, TN	L 23–43	9,356	
September 19	Villanova	City Stadium; Lynchburg, VA	L 20–24	8,530	
September 26	Eastern Illinois	City Stadium; Lynchburg, VA	L 14–17	6,100	
October 10	at No. 4 (I-AA) Appalachian State	Conrad Stadium; Boone, NC	L 6–24	13,715	
October 17	at Murray State	Roy Stewart Stadium; Murray, KY	L 12–34	4,560	
October 24	Newberry	City Stadium; Lynchburg, VA	W 20–19	8,860	
October 31	at Western Illinois	Hanson Field; Macomb, IL	L 14–24	5,000	
November 7	at No. 7 UCF	Florida Citrus Bowl; Orlando, FL	L 21–42	11,081	
November 14	Towson State	City Stadium; Lynchburg, VA	W 31–14	6,575	
Rankings from NCAA Division II Football Committee Poll released prior to the game
