= Bill Baldridge =

American football player and coach

Biographical details
- Born: c. 1943

Playing career
- 1963–1966: Morehead State
- Position: End

Coaching career (HC unless noted)
- 1970–1972: Harrodsburg HS (KY)
- 1973: Georgetown (KY) (assistant)
- 1974: Harrodsburg HS (KY)
- 1975: Morehead State (assistant)
- 1976–1977: Bellevue HS (KY)
- 1978–1979: Murray State (assistant)
- 1980: Georgetown (KY)
- 1981–1982: Cincinnati (associate HC)
- 1983: Kansas (assistant)
- 1984–1989: Morehead State
- 2006–2007: Rowan County HS (KY)

Head coaching record
- Overall: 24–50 (college)

Accomplishments and honors

Awards
- OVC Coach of the Year (1986)

Bill Baldridge (born c. 1943) is an American former football player and coach. He served as the head football coach at Georgetown College in Georgetown, Kentucky in 1980 and at Morehead State University in Morehead, Kentucky from 1984 to 1989, compiling a career college football coaching record of 24–50. As an assistant at Morehead State in 1975, he coached Phil Simms, future quarterback in the National Football League (NFL).

== Head coaching record ==
=== College ===
Year	Team	Overall	Conference	Standing	Bowl/playoffs
Georgetown Tigers (Heartland Collegiate Conference) (1980)
1980	Georgetown	4–5	3–4	T–5th	
Georgetown:		4–5	3–4		
Morehead State Eagles (Ohio Valley Conference) (1984–1989)
1984	Morehead State	2–9	1–6	7th	
1985	Morehead State	1–10	0–7	8th	
1986	Morehead State	7–4	3–4	T–5th	
1987	Morehead State	2–8	1–5	T–6th	
1988	Morehead State	3–8	2–4	T–4th	
1989	Morehead State	5–6	2–4	T–5th	
Morehead State:		20–45	9–30		
Total:		24–50			
