= 1987 Montana Grizzlies football team =

American college football season

1987 Montana Grizzlies football
- Conference: Big Sky Conference
- Record: 6–5 (5–3 Big Sky)
- Head coach: Don Read (2nd season)
- Offensive coordinator: Tommy Lee (2nd season)
- Defensive coordinator: Bill Smith (2nd season)
- Home stadium: Washington–Grizzly Stadium

1987 Big Sky Conference football standings
	Conf.					Overall
Team	W		L		T	W		L		T
No. 5 Idaho $^	7	–	1	–	0	9	–	3	–	0
No. 10 Weber State ^	7	–	1	–	0	10	–	3	–	0
Montana	5	–	3	–	0	6	–	5	–	0
Boise State	4	–	4	–	0	6	–	5	–	0
Nevada	4	–	4	–	0	5	–	6	–	0
Northern Arizona	4	–	4	–	0	7	–	4	–	0
Idaho State	3	–	5	–	0	3	–	7	–	1
Eastern Washington	2	–	6	–	0	4	–	7	–	0
Montana State	0	–	8	–	0	1	–	10	–	0
$ – Conference champion; ^ – NCAA Division I-AA playoff participant; Rankings from NCAA Division I-AA Poll

The 1987 Montana Grizzlies football team represented the University of Montana in the 1987 NCAA Division I-AA football season as a member of the Big Sky Conference. The Grizzlies were led by second-year head coach Don Read and finished the season with a record of six wins and five losses (6–5, 5–3 Big Sky).

This was the first full season that Montana played at Washington–Grizzly Stadium; the on-campus venue opened the previous October.

== Schedule ==
Date	Time	Opponent	Rank	Site	Result	Attendance	Source
September 12		No. 7 (D-II) Portland State*		Washington–Grizzly Stadium; Missoula, MT	L 3–20	8,450	
September 19		at Northern Arizona		Walkup Skydome; Flagstaff, AZ	L 17–24	10,538	
September 26		No. 1 Nevada		Washington–Grizzly Stadium; Missoula, MT	W 41–29	8,200	
October 3	12:30 p.m.	at No. 4 Northern Iowa*		UNI-Dome; Cedar Falls, IA	W 33–16	12,027	
October 10	8:00 p.m.	at Idaho	No. 15	Kibbie Dome; Moscow, ID (Little Brown Stein)	L 25–31	9,500	
October 17		No. 19 Boise State		Washington–Grizzly Stadium; Missoula, MT	W 12–3	10,107	
October 24		No. 10 Weber State		Washington–Grizzly Stadium; Missoula, MT	L 26–29	12,318	
October 31		at Montana State		Reno H. Sales Stadium; Bozeman, MT (rivalry)	W 55–7	17,027	
November 7		Idaho State		Washington–Grizzly Stadium; Missoula, MT	W 63–0	8,263	
November 14		at Eastern Washington		Joe Albi Stadium; Spokane, WA (EWU–UM Governors Cup)	W 22–3	3,553	
November 21		at Cal State Fullerton*		Santa Ana Stadium; Santa Ana, CA	L 26–43	2,141	
*Non-conference game; Rankings from NCAA Division I-AA Football Committee Poll released prior to the game; All times are in Mountain time
