= 1987 Weber State Wildcats football team =

American college football season

1987 Weber State Wildcats football

NCAA Division I-AA Quarterfinal, L 23–51 vs. Marshall
- Conference: Big Sky Conference
- Record: 10–3 (7–1 Big Sky)
- Head coach: Mike Price (7th season)
- Home stadium: Wildcat Stadium

1987 Big Sky Conference football standings
	Conf.					Overall
Team	W		L		T	W		L		T
No. 5 Idaho $^	7	–	1	–	0	9	–	3	–	0
No. 10 Weber State ^	7	–	1	–	0	10	–	3	–	0
Montana	5	–	3	–	0	6	–	5	–	0
Boise State	4	–	4	–	0	6	–	5	–	0
Nevada	4	–	4	–	0	5	–	6	–	0
Northern Arizona	4	–	4	–	0	7	–	4	–	0
Idaho State	3	–	5	–	0	3	–	7	–	1
Eastern Washington	2	–	6	–	0	4	–	7	–	0
Montana State	0	–	8	–	0	1	–	10	–	0
$ – Conference champion; ^ – NCAA Division I-AA playoff participant; Rankings from NCAA Division I-AA Poll

The 1987 Weber State Wildcats football team represented Weber State University as a member of the Big Sky Conference during the 1987 NCAA Division I-AA football season. Led by seventh-year head coach Mike Price and junior quarterback Jeff Carlson, the Wildcats compiled an overall record of 10–3 with a mark of 7–1 in conference play, placing second in the Big Sky behind the conference champion, Idaho. For the first time, Weber State was invited to the NCAA Division I-AA Football Championship playoffs, where they defeated the aforementioned Vandals in the first round before falling in the quarterfinal round to Marshall.

== Schedule ==
Date	Opponent	Rank	Site	Result	Attendance	Source
September 5	Western State (CO)*		Wildcat Stadium; Ogden, UT	W 40–10		
September 12	at Long Beach State*		Veterans Stadium; Long Beach, CA	L 7–30	6,109	
September 19	Southern Utah		Wildcat Stadium; Ogden, UT (Beehive Bowl)	W 36–26		
September 26	No. 9 Boise State		Wildcat Stadium; Ogden, UT	W 55–44	10,647	
October 10	Northern Arizona		Wildcat Stadium; Ogden, UT	W 30–17		
October 17	Montana State	No. 13	Reno H. Sales Stadium; Bozeman, MT	W 35–32	12,397	
October 24	Montana	No. 10	Washington–Grizzly Stadium; Missoula, MT	W 29–26	12,318	
October 31	No. 12 Idaho	No. 7	Wildcat Stadium; Ogden, UT	L 38–41	13,486	
November 7	Eastern Washington	No. 13	Wildcat Stadium; Ogden, UT	W 46–23	4,212	
November 14	Nevada	No. 13	Mackay Stadium; Reno, NV	W 38–15	11,143	
November 21	at Idaho State	No. 11	ASISU Minidome; Pocatello, ID	W 53–37		
November 28	at No. 5 Idaho	No. 10	Kibbie Dome; Moscow, ID (NCAA Division I-AA First Round)	W 59–30	4,900	
December 5	at No. 14 Marshall*	No. 10	Fairfield Stadium; Huntington, WV (NCAA Division I-AA Quarterfinal)	L 51–23	13,197	
*Non-conference game; Rankings from NCAA Division I-AA Football Committee Poll released prior to the game
