= 1987 Eastern Kentucky Colonels football team =

American college football season

1987 Eastern Kentucky Colonels football

OVC co-champion

NCAA Division I-AA Quarterfinal, L 32–33 at Northeast Louisiana
- Conference: Ohio Valley Conference
- Record: 9–3 (5–1 OVC)
- Head coach: Roy Kidd (24th season)
- Home stadium: Hanger Field

1987 Ohio Valley Conference football standings
	Conf.					Overall
Team	W		L		T	W		L		T
No. 7 Eastern Kentucky +^	5	–	1	–	0	9	–	3	–	0
No. 15 Youngstown State +^	5	–	1	–	0	8	–	4	–	0
Middle Tennessee	4	–	2	–	0	6	–	5	–	0
Murray State	3	–	3	–	0	6	–	5	–	0
Tennessee Tech	2	–	4	–	0	5	–	6	–	0
Morehead State	1	–	5	–	0	2	–	8	–	0
Austin Peay	1	–	5	–	0	2	–	9	–	0
+ – Conference co-champions; ^ – NCAA Division I-AA playoff participant; Rankings from NCAA Division I-AA Football Committee poll

The 1987 Eastern Kentucky Colonels football team represented Eastern Kentucky University as a member of the Ohio Valley Conference (OVC) during the 1987 NCAA Division I-AA football season. Led by 24th-year head coach Roy Kidd, the Colonels compiled an overall record of 9–3, with a mark of 5–1 in conference play, and finished as OVC co-champion. Eastern Kentucky advanced to the NCAA Division I-AA Quarterfinal and were defeated by Northeast Louisiana.

== Schedule ==
Date	Opponent	Rank	Site	Result	Attendance	Source
September 12	at Chattanooga*	No. 3	Chamberlain Field; Chattanooga, TN	L 0–10	8,585	
September 19	Marshall*		Hanger Field; Richmond, KY	W 37–34		
September 26	at No. 2 (D-II) UCF*		Florida Citrus Bowl; Orlando, FL	W 23–16	15,197	
October 3	Western Kentucky*	No. 12	Hanger Field; Richmond, KY (rivalry)	W 20–10	20,200	
October 10	Murray State	No. 5	Hanger Field; Richmond, KY	W 29–21		
October 17	at No. 20 Middle Tennessee	No. 4	Johnny "Red" Floyd Stadium; Murfreesboro, TN	L 16–17	11,000	
October 24	at Youngstown State	No. 16	Stambaugh Stadium; Youngstown, OH	W 14–7	9,060	
October 31	Austin Peay	No. 13	Hanger Field; Richmond, KY	W 50–7		
November 7	at Tennessee Tech*	No. 11	Tucker Stadium; Cookeville, TN	W 44–8		
November 21	at Morehead State	No. 7	Jayne Stadium; Morehead, KY (rivalry)	W 23–0	7,500	
November 28	No. 11 Western Kentucky*	No. 7	Hanger Field; Richmond, KY (NCAA Division I-AA First Round)	W 40–17	4,050	
December 5	at No. 3 Northeast Louisiana*	No. 7	Malone Stadium; Monroe, LA (NCAA Division I-AA Quarterfinal)	L 32–33		
*Non-conference game; Rankings from NCAA Division I-AA Football Committee Poll released prior to the game
