= 1987 Central Michigan Chippewas football team =

American college football season

1987 Central Michigan Chippewas football
- Conference: Mid-American Conference
- Record: 5–5–1 (3–4–1 MAC)
- Head coach: Herb Deromedi (10th season)
- MVP: Eric Reed
- Home stadium: Kelly/Shorts Stadium

1987 Mid-American Conference football standings
	Conf.					Overall
Team	W		L		T	W		L		T
Eastern Michigan $	7	–	1	–	0	10	–	2	–	0
Kent State	5	–	3	–	0	7	–	4	–	0
Miami (OH)	5	–	3	–	0	5	–	6	–	0
Bowling Green	5	–	3	–	0	5	–	6	–	0
Western Michigan	4	–	4	–	0	5	–	6	–	0
Central Michigan	3	–	4	–	1	5	–	5	–	1
Toledo	3	–	4	–	1	3	–	7	–	1
Ball State	3	–	5	–	0	4	–	7	–	0
Ohio	0	–	8	–	0	1	–	10	–	0
$ – Conference champion

The 1987 Central Michigan Chippewas football team represented Central Michigan University in the Mid-American Conference (MAC) during the 1987 NCAA Division I-A football season. In their 10th season under head coach Herb Deromedi, the Chippewas compiled a 5–5–1 record (3–4–1 against MAC opponents), finished in sixth place in the MAC standings, and outscored their opponents, 222 to 203. The team played its home games in Kelly/Shorts Stadium in Mount Pleasant, Michigan, with attendance of 101,481 in five home games.

The team's statistical leaders included quarterback Marcelle Carruthers with 1,323 passing yards, tailback John Hood with 1,121 rushing yards, and wide receiver Eric Reed with 652 receiving yards. Reed received the team's most valuable player award. Five Central Michigan players (offensive tackle Joe Churches, tailback John Hood, outside linebacker Phil Zielinski, inside linebacker Chris Wise, and defensive back Howard Young) received first-team All-MAC honors.

== Schedule ==
Date	Opponent	Site	Result	Attendance	Source
September 5	Miami (OH)	Kelly/Shorts Stadium; Mount Pleasant, MI	L 6–15	14,625	
September 12	at Idaho*	Kibbie Dome; Moscow, ID	W 30–18	8,000	
September 26	at Minnesota*	Hubert H. Humphrey Metrodome; Minneapolis, MN	L 10–30	46,868	
October 3	at Kent State	Dix Stadium; Kent, OH	L 21–24	10,200	
October 10	Eastern Michigan	Kelly/Shorts Stadium; Mount Pleasant, MI (rivalry)	W 16–6	25,906	
October 17	Tulsa*	Kelly/Shorts Stadium; Mount Pleasant, MI	W 41–18	19,612	
October 24	at Ball State	Ball State Stadium; Muncie, IN	L 3–13	3,525	
October 31	Western Michigan	Kelly/Shorts Stadium; Mount Pleasant, MI (rivalry)	W 30–27	25,151	
November 7	at Ohio	Peden Stadium; Athens, OH	W 31–17		
November 14	Toledo	Kelly/Shorts Stadium; Mount Pleasant, MI	T 17–17	14,705	
November 21	at Bowling Green	Doyt Perry Stadium; Bowling Green, OH	L 17–18	3,312	
*Non-conference game
