= 1987 Bowling Green Falcons football team =

American college football season

1987 Bowling Green Falcons football
- Conference: Mid-American Conference
- Record: 5–6 (5–3 MAC)
- Head coach: Moe Ankney (2nd season)
- Defensive coordinator: Bob Wolfe (2nd season)
- Home stadium: Doyt Perry Stadium

1987 Mid-American Conference football standings
| | Conf. | | | | | Overall |
| Team | W | | L | | T | W | | L | | T |
|---|---|---|---|---|---|---|---|---|---|---|
| Eastern Michigan $ | 7 | – | 1 | – | 0 | 10 | – | 2 | – | 0 |
| Kent State | 5 | – | 3 | – | 0 | 7 | – | 4 | – | 0 |
| Miami (OH) | 5 | – | 3 | – | 0 | 5 | – | 6 | – | 0 |
| Bowling Green | 5 | – | 3 | – | 0 | 5 | – | 6 | – | 0 |
| Western Michigan | 4 | – | 4 | – | 0 | 5 | – | 6 | – | 0 |
| Central Michigan | 3 | – | 4 | – | 1 | 5 | – | 5 | – | 1 |
| Toledo | 3 | – | 4 | – | 1 | 3 | – | 7 | – | 1 |
| Ball State | 3 | – | 5 | – | 0 | 4 | – | 7 | – | 0 |
| Ohio | 0 | – | 8 | – | 0 | 1 | – | 10 | – | 0 |
$ – Conference champion

The 1987 Bowling Green Falcons football team was an American football team that represented Bowling Green University in the Mid-American Conference (MAC) during the 1987 NCAA Division I-A football season. In their second season under head coach Moe Ankney, the Falcons compiled a 5–6 record (5–3 against MAC opponents), finished in a tie for second place in the MAC, and were outscored by all opponents by a combined total of 249 to 215.

The team's statistical leaders included Rich Dackin with 2,211 passing yards, Shawn Daniels with 423 rushing yards, and Reggie Thornton with 698 receiving yards.

== Schedule ==
| Date | Opponent | Site | Result | Attendance | Source |
|---|---|---|---|---|---|
| September 5 | at No. 11 Penn State* | Beaver Stadium; University Park, PA | L 19–45 | 84,574 | |
| September 12 | Youngstown State* | Doyt Perry Stadium; Bowling Green, OH | L 17–20 | 10,000 | |
| September 19 | at Ball State | Ball State Stadium; Muncie, IN | W 24–0 | 11,750 | |
| September 26 | Western Michigan | Doyt Perry Stadium; Bowling Green, OH | L 27–34 | 18,054 | |
| October 3 | at Arizona* | Arizona Stadium; Tucson, AZ | L 7–45 | 43,498 | |
| October 10 | at Ohio | Peden Stadium; Athens, OH | W 28–7 | | |
| October 17 | Toledo | Doyt Perry Stadium; Bowling Green, OH (rivalry) | W 20–6 | | |
| October 31 | at Miami (OH) | Yager Stadium; Oxford, OH | L 7–17 | 22,208 | |
| November 7 | Kent State | Doyt Perry Stadium; Bowling Green, OH (rivalry) | W 30–20 | 20,612 | |
| November 14 | at Eastern Michigan | Rynearson Stadium; Ypsilanti, MI | L 18–38 | 20,205 | |
| November 21 | Central Michigan | Doyt Perry Stadium; Bowling Green, OH | W 18–17 | 3,312 | |
*Non-conference game; Rankings from AP Poll released prior to the game
