= 1987 Northern Arizona Lumberjacks football team =

American college football season

1987 Northern Arizona Lumberjacks football
- Conference: Big Sky Conference
- Record: 7–4 (4–4 Big Sky)
- Head coach: Larry Kentera (3rd season)
- Home stadium: Walkup Skydome

1987 Big Sky Conference football standings
	Conf.					Overall
Team	W		L		T	W		L		T
No. 5 Idaho $^	7	–	1	–	0	9	–	3	–	0
No. 10 Weber State ^	7	–	1	–	0	10	–	3	–	0
Montana	5	–	3	–	0	6	–	5	–	0
Boise State	4	–	4	–	0	6	–	5	–	0
Nevada	4	–	4	–	0	5	–	6	–	0
Northern Arizona	4	–	4	–	0	7	–	4	–	0
Idaho State	3	–	5	–	0	3	–	7	–	1
Eastern Washington	2	–	6	–	0	4	–	7	–	0
Montana State	0	–	8	–	0	1	–	10	–	0
$ – Conference champion; ^ – NCAA Division I-AA playoff participant; Rankings from NCAA Division I-AA Poll

The 1987 Northern Arizona Lumberjacks football team represented Northern Arizona University as a member of the Big Sky Conference during the 1987 NCAA Division I-AA football season. Led by third-year head coach Larry Kentera, the Lumberjacks compiled an overall record of 7–4, with a mark of 4–4 in conference play, and finished tied for fourth in the Big Sky.

== Schedule ==
Date	Opponent	Rank	Site	Result	Attendance	Source
September 5	at Northern Colorado*		Jackson Field; Greeley, CO	W 44–17	1,512	
September 19	Montana		Walkup Skydome; Flagstaff, AZ	W 24–17	10,538	
September 26	Idaho	No. 14	Walkup Skydome; Flagstaff, AZ	L 37–46	9,029	
October 3	Sonoma State*		Walkup Skydome; Flagstaff, AZ	W 55–6	12,765	
October 10	at Weber State	No. 10	Wildcat Stadium; Ogden, UT	L 17–30		
October 17	at Idaho State		ASISU Minidome; Pocatello, ID	W 32–23		
October 24	Montana State		Walkup Skydome; Flagstaff, AZ	W 54–21	13,856	
October 31	at Eastern Washington	No. 19	Joe Albi Stadium; Spokane, WA	W 41–24	1,717	
November 7	at Tulsa*	No. 19	Skelly Stadium; Tulsa, OK	W 24–20	10,863	
November 14	at Boise State	No. 16	Bronco Stadium; Boise, ID	L 18–48	15,286	
November 21	Nevada		Walkup Skydome; Flagstaff, AZ	L 39–40	10,123	
*Non-conference game; Rankings from NCAA Division I-AA Football Committee Poll released prior to the game
