= 1987 Idaho State Bengals football team =

American college football season

1987 Idaho State Bengals football
- Conference: Big Sky Conference
- Record: 3–7–1 (3–5 Big Sky)
- Head coach: Jim Koetter (5th season)
- Offensive scheme: West Coast
- Defensive coordinator: Bill Flodin (1st season)
- Base defense: 4–3
- Home stadium: ASISU Minidome

1987 Big Sky Conference football standings
	Conf.					Overall
Team	W		L		T	W		L		T
No. 5 Idaho $^	7	–	1	–	0	9	–	3	–	0
No. 10 Weber State ^	7	–	1	–	0	10	–	3	–	0
Montana	5	–	3	–	0	6	–	5	–	0
Boise State	4	–	4	–	0	6	–	5	–	0
Nevada	4	–	4	–	0	5	–	6	–	0
Northern Arizona	4	–	4	–	0	7	–	4	–	0
Idaho State	3	–	5	–	0	3	–	7	–	1
Eastern Washington	2	–	6	–	0	4	–	7	–	0
Montana State	0	–	8	–	0	1	–	10	–	0
$ – Conference champion; ^ – NCAA Division I-AA playoff participant; Rankings from NCAA Division I-AA Poll

The 1987 Idaho State Bengals football team represented Idaho State University as a member of the Big Sky Conference during the 1987 NCAA Division I-AA football season. Led by fifth-year head coach Jim Koetter, the Bengals compiled an overall record of 3–7–1, with a mark of 3–5 in conference play, and finished seventh in the Big Sky.

== Schedule ==
Date	Opponent	Site	Result	Attendance	Source
September 12	Texas A&I*	ASISU Minidome; Pocatello, ID	L 51–52	7,893	
September 19	at Eastern Washington	Joe Albi Stadium; Spokane, WA	L 14–44	3,862	
September 26	at Utah*	Robert Rice Stadium; Salt Lake City, UT	L 16–51	32,283	
October 3	No. 15 Idaho	ASISU Minidome; Pocatello, ID (Rivalry)	W 30–21	10,764	
October 10	Portland State*	ASISU Minidome; Pocatello, ID	T 24–24	7,325	
October 17	Northern Arizona	ASISU Minidome; Pocatello, ID	L 23–32		
October 24	at Boise State	Bronco Stadium; Boise, ID	W 35–32	21,255	
October 31	at Nevada	Mackay Stadium; Reno, NV	L 19–40	11,236	
November 7	at Montana	Washington–Grizzly Stadium; Missoula, MT	L 0–63	8,263	
November 14	Montana State	ASISU Minidome; Pocatello, ID	W 52–33	6,050	
November 21	No. 11 Weber State	ASISU Minidome; Pocatello, ID	L 37–53		
*Non-conference game; Rankings from NCAA Division I-AA Football Committee Poll released prior to the game
