= 1987 Youngstown State Penguins football team =

American college football season

1987 Youngstown State Penguins football

OVC co-champion

NCAA Division I-AA First Round, L 28–31 at Northern Iowa
- Conference: Ohio Valley Conference
- Record: 8–4 (5–1 OVC)
- Head coach: Jim Tressel (2nd season)
- Defensive coordinator: Jim Bollman (2nd season)
- Home stadium: Stambaugh Stadium

1987 Ohio Valley Conference football standings
| | Conf. | | | | | Overall |
| Team | W | | L | | T | W | | L | | T |
|---|---|---|---|---|---|---|---|---|---|---|
| No. 7 Eastern Kentucky +^ | 5 | – | 1 | – | 0 | 9 | – | 3 | – | 0 |
| No. 15 Youngstown State +^ | 5 | – | 1 | – | 0 | 8 | – | 4 | – | 0 |
| Middle Tennessee | 4 | – | 2 | – | 0 | 6 | – | 5 | – | 0 |
| Murray State | 3 | – | 3 | – | 0 | 6 | – | 5 | – | 0 |
| Tennessee Tech | 2 | – | 4 | – | 0 | 5 | – | 6 | – | 0 |
| Morehead State | 1 | – | 5 | – | 0 | 2 | – | 8 | – | 0 |
| Austin Peay | 1 | – | 5 | – | 0 | 2 | – | 9 | – | 0 |
+ – Conference co-champions; ^ – NCAA Division I-AA playoff participant; Rankings from NCAA Division I-AA Football Committee poll

The 1987 Youngstown State Penguins football team represented Youngstown State University as a member of the Ohio Valley Conference (OVC) during the 1987 NCAA Division I-AA football season. Led by second-year head coach Jim Tressel, the Penguins compiled an overall record of 8–4, with a mark of 5–1 in conference play, and finished as OVC co-champion. Youngstown State advanced to the NCAA Division I-AA first round and were defeated by Northern Iowa.

== Schedule ==
| Date | Opponent | Rank | Site | Result | Attendance | Source |
|---|---|---|---|---|---|---|
| September 5 | at Eastern Michigan* | | Rynearson Stadium; Ypsilanti, MI | L 20–35 | 17,252 | |
| September 12 | at Bowling Green* | | Doyt Perry Stadium; Bowling Green, OH | W 20–17 | 10,000 | |
| September 26 | at Marshall* | | Fairfield Stadium; Huntington, WV | L 13–38 | | |
| October 3 | Northeastern* | | Stambaugh Stadium; Youngstown, OH | W 29–14 | | |
| October 10 | at Tennessee Tech | | Tucker Stadium; Cookeville, TN | W 18–15 | | |
| October 17 | Austin Peay | | Stambaugh Stadium; Youngstown, OH | W 20–18 | | |
| October 24 | No. 16 Eastern Kentucky | | Stambaugh Stadium; Youngstown, OH | L 7–14 | 9,060 | |
| October 31 | at No. T–20 Middle Tennessee | | Johnny "Red" Floyd Stadium; Murfreesboro, TN | W 17–16 | 13,400 | |
| November 7 | Murray State | | Stambaugh Stadium; Youngstown, OH | W 20–13 | | |
| November 14 | Morehead State | No. T–20 | Stambaugh Stadium; Youngstown, OH | W 38–14 | | |
| November 20 | at Akron* | No. 19 | Rubber Bowl; Akron, OH (Steel Tire) | W 10–6 | 1,300 | |
| November 28 | at No. 4 Northern Iowa* | No. 15 | UNI-Dome; Cedar Falls, IA (NCAA Division I-AA First Round) | L 28–31 | 3,887 | |
*Non-conference game; Rankings from NCAA Division I-AA Football Committee Poll released prior to the game
