= 1987 Eastern Washington Eagles football team =

American college football season

1987 Eastern Washington Eagles football
- Conference: Big Sky Conference
- Record: 4–7 (2–6 Big Sky)
- Head coach: Dick Zornes (9th season)
- Home stadium: Joe Albi Stadium

1987 Big Sky Conference football standings
	Conf.					Overall
Team	W		L		T	W		L		T
No. 5 Idaho $^	7	–	1	–	0	9	–	3	–	0
No. 10 Weber State ^	7	–	1	–	0	10	–	3	–	0
Montana	5	–	3	–	0	6	–	5	–	0
Boise State	4	–	4	–	0	6	–	5	–	0
Nevada	4	–	4	–	0	5	–	6	–	0
Northern Arizona	4	–	4	–	0	7	–	4	–	0
Idaho State	3	–	5	–	0	3	–	7	–	1
Eastern Washington	2	–	6	–	0	4	–	7	–	0
Montana State	0	–	8	–	0	1	–	10	–	0
$ – Conference champion; ^ – NCAA Division I-AA playoff participant; Rankings from NCAA Division I-AA Poll

The 1987 Eastern Washington Eagles football team was an American football team that represented Eastern Washington University as a member of the Big Sky Conference during the 1987 NCAA Division I-AA football season. Led by ninth-year head coach Dick Zornes, the Eagles compiled an overall record of 4–7, with a mark of 2–6 in conference play, and finished eighth in the Big Sky.

== Schedule ==
Date	Opponent	Site	Result	Attendance	Source
September 5	Augustana (SD)*	Joe Albi Stadium; Spokane, WA	W 14–10	1,346	
September 12	No. 6 Nevada	Joe Albi Stadium; Spokane, WA	L 26–40	3,899	
September 19	Idaho State	Joe Albi Stadium; Spokane, WA	W 44–14	3,862	
September 26	at Montana State	Reno H. Sales Stadium; Bozeman, MT	W 32–30	11,187	
October 3	at Stephen F. Austin*	Homer Bryce Stadium; Nacogdoches, TX	W 3–0		
October 10	at Boise State	Bronco Stadium; Boise, ID	L 13–38	18,672	
October 17	Illinois State*	Joe Albi Stadium; Spokane, WA	L 14–31	4,232	
October 24	at No. 14 Idaho	Kibbie Dome; Moscow, ID	L 24–31	11,500	
October 31	No. 19 Northern Arizona	Joe Albi Stadium; Spokane, WA	L 24–41	1,717	
November 7	at No. 13 Weber State	Wildcat Stadium; Ogden, UT	L 23–46	4,212	
November 14	Montana	Joe Albi Stadium; Spokane, WA (EWU–UM Governors Cup)	L 3–22	3,553	
*Non-conference game; Rankings from NCAA Division I-AA Football Committee Poll released prior to the game
