= 1987 Illinois State Redbirds football team =

American college football season

1987 Illinois State Redbirds football
- Conference: Gateway Collegiate Athletic Conference
- Record: 3–7 (0–6 GCAC)
- Head coach: Bob Otolski (7th season)
- Home stadium: Hancock Stadium

1987 Gateway Collegiate Athletic Conference football standings
	Conf.					Overall
Team	W		L		T	W		L		T
No. 4 Northern Iowa $^	6	–	0	–	0	10	–	4	–	0
Western Illinois	5	–	1	–	0	7	–	4	–	0
Eastern Illinois	3	–	3	–	0	5	–	6	–	0
SW Missouri State	3	–	3	–	0	5	–	6	–	0
Indiana State	2	–	4	–	0	5	–	6	–	0
Southern Illinois	2	–	4	–	0	3	–	8	–	0
Illinois State	0	–	6	–	0	3	–	7	–	0
$ – Conference champion; ^ – NCAA Division I-AA playoff participant; Rankings from NCAA Division I-AA Football Committee poll

The 1987 Illinois State Redbirds football team represented Illinois State University as a member of the Gateway Collegiate Athletic Conference (GCAC) during the 1987 NCAA Division I-AA football season. In their seventh year under head coach Bob Otolski, the Redbirds compiled an overall record of 3–7, with a mark of 0–6 in conference play, and placed seventh in the GCAC. Illinois State played home games at Hancock Stadium in Normal, Illinois.

== Schedule ==
Date	Opponent	Rank	Site	Result	Attendance	Source
September 12	Western Michigan*		Hancock Stadium; Normal, IL	W 20–6		
September 19	at Eastern Illinois	No. T–14	O'Brien Field; Charleston, IL (rivalry)	L 9–15		
September 26	at Southern Illinois		McAndrew Stadium; Carbondale, IL	L 7–38	13,500	
October 3	No. T–17 Western Illinois		Hancock Stadium; Normal, IL	L 22–31		
October 17	at Eastern Washington*		Joe Albi Stadium; Spokane, WA	W 31–14	4,232	
October 24	Indiana State		Hancock Stadium; Normal, IL	L 3–10		
October 31	at Southwest Missouri State		Briggs Stadium; Springfield, MO	L 15–31	7,855	
November 7	No. 1 (D-II) Northern Michigan*		Hancock Stadium; Normal, IL	W 17–10		
November 14	No. 17 Maine*		Hancock Stadium; Normal, IL	L 34–37		
November 21	at No. 4 Northern Iowa		UNI-Dome; Cedar Falls, IA	L 17–48	9,582	
*Non-conference game; Rankings from NCAA Division I-AA Football Committee Poll released prior to the game
