= 1987 Northern Iowa Panthers football team =

American college football season

1987 Northern Iowa Panthers football

Gateway champion

NCAA Division I-AA Semifinal, L 41–44 vs. Northeast Louisiana
- Conference: Gateway Collegiate Athletic Conference
- Record: 10–4 (6–0 GCAC)
- Head coach: Darrell Mudra (5th season)
- Home stadium: UNI-Dome

1987 Gateway Collegiate Athletic Conference football standings
| | Conf. | | | | | Overall |
| Team | W | | L | | T | W | | L | | T |
|---|---|---|---|---|---|---|---|---|---|---|
| No. 4 Northern Iowa $^ | 6 | – | 0 | – | 0 | 10 | – | 4 | – | 0 |
| Western Illinois | 5 | – | 1 | – | 0 | 7 | – | 4 | – | 0 |
| Eastern Illinois | 3 | – | 3 | – | 0 | 5 | – | 6 | – | 0 |
| SW Missouri State | 3 | – | 3 | – | 0 | 5 | – | 6 | – | 0 |
| Indiana State | 2 | – | 4 | – | 0 | 5 | – | 6 | – | 0 |
| Southern Illinois | 2 | – | 4 | – | 0 | 3 | – | 8 | – | 0 |
| Illinois State | 0 | – | 6 | – | 0 | 3 | – | 7 | – | 0 |
$ – Conference champion; ^ – NCAA Division I-AA playoff participant; Rankings from NCAA Division I-AA Football Committee poll

The 1987 Northern Iowa Panthers football team was an American football team that represented the University of Northern Iowa as a member of the Gateway Collegiate Athletic Conference (Gateway Conference) during the 1987 NCAA Division I-AA football season. In its fifth and final season under head coach Darrell Mudra, the team compiled a 10–4 record (6–0 in conference games) and won the Gateway Conference championship. The Panthers advanced to the NCAA Division I-AA playoffs, defeating Youngstown State in the first round and Arkansas State in the quarterfinals before losing to Northeast Louisiana in the semifinals. The team gained an average of 428.6 yards of total offense, 526.6 all-purpose yards, and 261.5 passing yards per game.

Running back Carl Boyd rushed for 1,223 yards and 2,037 all-purpose yards, scored 108 points, and was named to the Kodak Division I-AA All-America team and was selected as the Gateway Conference offensive player of the year. Quarterback Mike Smith completed 228 of 386 passes for 2,859 yards and 23 touchdowns. In late May 1988, Mudra announced his retirement from coaching.

Seven Northern Iowa players were honored as first-team players on the 1987 all-Gateway Conference football team: Boyd; Smith; defensive end Jeff Bealles; offensive guard Louis Cox; defensive back Kevin Anderson; center Mark Hanssen; and tight end Sherrod Howard. Three others were named to the second team.

The team played its home games at the UNI-Dome in Cedar Falls, Iowa.

== Schedule ==
| Date | Time | Opponent | Rank | Site | TV | Result | Attendance | Source |
|---|---|---|---|---|---|---|---|---|
| September 5 | 7:00 p.m. | at McNeese State* | | Cowboy Stadium; Lake Charles, LA | | W 34–31 | 18,500 | |
| September 12 | 7:00 p.m. | at Minnesota* | | Metrodome; Minneapolis, MN | KITN | L 7–24 | 50,120 | |
| September 19 | 7:00 p.m. | Montana State* | No. 12 | UNI-Dome; Cedar Falls, IA | | W 53–7 | 14,213 | |
| September 26 | 1:30 p.m. | at Indiana State | No. 6 | Memorial Stadium; Terre Haute, IN | | W 38–14 | 8,457 | |
| October 3 | 1:30 p.m. | Montana*^{†} | No. 4 | UNI-Dome; Cedar Falls, IA | | L 16–33 | 12,027 | |
| October 10 | 1:00 p.m. | at Iowa State* | No. 11 | Cyclone Stadium; Ames, IA | | L 38–39 | 46,515 | |
| October 24 | 1:00 p.m. | Western Illinois | No. 12 | Hanson Field; Macomb, IL | | W 52–7 | 14,291 | |
| October 31 | 7:00 p.m. | at Eastern Illinois | No. 10 | UNI-Dome; Cedar Falls, IA | | W 19–17 | 13,203 | |
| November 7 | 1:30 p.m. | at Southwest Missouri State | No. 7 | Briggs Stadium; Springfield, MO | | W 17–13 | 3,343 | |
| November 14 | 7:00 p.m. | Southern Illinois | No. 5 | UNI-Dome; Cedar Falls, IA | | W 20–3 | 11,813 | |
| November 21 | 7:00 p.m. | Illinois State | No. 4 | UNI-Dome; Cedar Falls, IA | | W 48–17 | 9,582 | |
| November 28 | | No. 15 Youngstown State* | No. 4 | UNI-Dome; Cedar Falls, IA (NCAA Division I-AA First Round) | | W 31–28 | 3,887 | |
| December 5 | | No. 12 Arkansas State* | No. 4 | UNI-Dome; Cedar Falls, IA (NCAA Division I-AA Quarterfinal) | | W 48–28 | 6,100 | |
| December 12 | | at No. 3 Northeast Louisiana* | No. 4 | Malone Stadium; Monroe, LA (NCAA Division I-AA Semifinal) | | L 41–44 ^{2OT} | 14,443 | |
*Non-conference game; ^{†}Homecoming; Rankings from NCAA Division I-AA Football Committee Poll released prior to the game; All times are in Central time
