= 1987 Idaho Vandals football team =

American college football season

1987 Idaho Vandals football

Big Sky champion

NCAA Division I-AA First Round, L 30–59 vs. Weber State
- Conference: Big Sky Conference

Ranking
- AP: No. 5
- Record: 9–3 (7–1 Big Sky)
- Head coach: Keith Gilbertson (2nd season)
- Offensive coordinator: Bill Diedrick (2nd season)
- Defensive coordinator: Barry Lamb (1st season)
- Base defense: 4–3
- Home stadium: Kibbie Dome

1987 Big Sky Conference football standings
	Conf.					Overall
Team	W		L		T	W		L		T
No. 5 Idaho $^	7	–	1	–	0	9	–	3	–	0
No. 10 Weber State ^	7	–	1	–	0	10	–	3	–	0
Montana	5	–	3	–	0	6	–	5	–	0
Boise State	4	–	4	–	0	6	–	5	–	0
Nevada	4	–	4	–	0	5	–	6	–	0
Northern Arizona	4	–	4	–	0	7	–	4	–	0
Idaho State	3	–	5	–	0	3	–	7	–	1
Eastern Washington	2	–	6	–	0	4	–	7	–	0
Montana State	0	–	8	–	0	1	–	10	–	0
$ – Conference champion; ^ – NCAA Division I-AA playoff participant; Rankings from NCAA Division I-AA Poll

The 1987 Idaho Vandals football team represented the University of Idaho in the 1987 NCAA Division I-AA football season. The Vandals, led by second-year head coach Keith Gilbertson, were members of the Big Sky Conference and played their home games at the Kibbie Dome, an indoor facility on campus in Moscow, Idaho.

The Vandals won their second conference title in three seasons, and made the I-AA playoffs for the third consecutive season. Led by redshirt sophomore quarterback John Friesz, Idaho finished the regular season at 9–2 and 7–1 in the Big Sky.

== Notable games ==
Following a non-conference loss at home to Central Michigan, and a road loss to struggling intrastate rival Idaho State, Idaho won its final six games of the regular season. The Vandals defeated Nevada for only the second time in the ten meetings since the Wolf Pack joined the Big Sky in 1979, and defeated rival Boise State for the sixth consecutive year, the sixth of twelve straight over the Broncos.

== Division I-AA playoffs ==
For the third consecutive season, Idaho returned to the 16-team I-AA playoffs. The Vandals hosted conference foe Weber State, whom they had defeated in Utah four weeks earlier by three points. The Wildcats won the rematch 59–30, before a sparse crowd at the Kibbie Dome two days after Thanksgiving, ending the Vandals' season at 9–3.

== Notable players ==
The 1987 team included two future NFL players with lengthy pro careers: guard Mark Schlereth and redshirt sophomore John Friesz, a future collegiate hall of fame quarterback as a three-year starter (1987–89).

== Schedule ==
Date	Time	Opponent	Rank	Site	Result	Attendance	Source
September 5	7:00 pm	Mankato State*	No. 20	Kibbie Dome; Moscow, ID	W 31–17	7,600	
September 12	7:00 pm	Central Michigan*	No. 20	Kibbie Dome; Moscow, ID	L 18–30	8,000	
September 19	7:00 pm	at No. 6 (D-II) Portland State*		Civic Stadium; Portland, OR	W 17–10	8,535	
September 26	7:00 pm	at Northern Arizona		Walkup Skydome; Flagstaff, AZ	W 46–37	9,029	
October 3	6:30 pm	at Idaho State	No. 15	ISU MiniDome; Pocatello, ID (rivalry)	L 21–30	10,764	
October 10	7:00 pm	Montana		Kibbie Dome; Moscow, ID (Little Brown Stein)	W 31–25	9,500	
October 17	1:00 pm	No. 11 Nevada^{†}		Kibbie Dome; Moscow, ID	W 38–28	15,100	
October 24	7:00 pm	Eastern Washington	No. 14	Kibbie Dome; Moscow, ID (Governors Cup)	W 31–24	11,500	
October 31	12:00 pm	at No. 7 Weber State	No. 12	Wildcat Stadium; Ogden, UT	W 41–38	13,486	
November 7	12:00 pm	at Montana State	No. 10	Reno H. Sales Stadium; Bozeman, MT	W 14–7	6,007	
November 21	4:30 pm	Boise State	No. 5	Kibbie Dome; Moscow, ID (rivalry)	W 40–34	16,500	
November 28	12:30 pm	No. 10 Weber State*	No. 5	Kibbie Dome; Moscow, ID (NCAA Division I-AA First Round)	L 30–59	4,900	
*Non-conference game; ^{†}Homecoming; Rankings from NCAA (Div. I-AA); All times are in Pacific time

== Roster ==
1987 Idaho Vandals football team roster
Players
Coaches
Offense

Pos.	#	Name	Class
FL	6	Eric Jorgensen	Jr
SE		John Jake
QB		Steve Nolan	Fr
QB	17	John Friesz	So
RB		Bruce Harris	Fr
RB	20	Todd Hoiness	Jr
RB		Larry Leverett	So
TE		Craig Robinson	Sr
TE		Chris Slater	Jr
OT	70	Greg Hale	Jr
G	67	Todd Neu	So
C		Steve Unger	So
G	60	Mark Schlereth	Jr
OT	63	Troy Wright	So

Defense

Pos.	#	Name	Class
CB	1	Richard Carey	Jr
FS	8	Ernest Sanders	Sr
CB	29	Virgil Paulsen	Sr
SS		Dan McCanna	Sr
LB	51	Jerry Medved	Jr
LB		Jim Medved	Jr
LB		Mark Matthews	Fr
LB	31	Kevin Johnson	Sr
DE		Pete Wilkins	Sr
DT		Craig Dowdy	Sr
DT		Michael Bailey	Jr
DE		Kord Smith	Sr

Special teams

Pos.	#	Name	Class
K		Brian Decicio	Jr
P		John Pleas	Jr

Head coach

- Keith Gilbertson (2nd year)

Coordinators/assistant coaches

- Bill Diedrick (OC)
- Barry Lamb (DC)
- Mike Cox (LB)

Legend

- (C) Team captain
- (S) Suspended
- (I) Ineligible
- Injured
- Redshirt

== All-conference ==
Six Vandals were named to the all-conference team: quarterback John Friesz, tackle Greg Hale, guard Todd Neu, defensive end Pete Wilkins, safety Ernest Sanders, and cornerback Virgil Paulsen. Second team selections were wide receiver Eric Jorgensen, tight end Craig Robinson, and punter John Pleas. Honorable mention were wide receiver/kick returner John Jake, running back Todd Hoiness, center Steve Unger, defensive linemen Kord Smith and Jim Routos, and placekicker Brian Decicio.

Friesz, from Coeur d'Alene, was also named the Big Sky's outstanding offensive player.
