= 1987 Southwest Missouri State Bears football team =

American college football season

1987 Southwest Missouri State Bears football
- Conference: Gateway Football Conference
- Record: 5–6 (3–3 GFC)
- Head coach: Jesse Branch (2nd season)
- Defensive coordinator: Dave Wommack (2nd season)
- Captains: Ken Braden; Preston Estes; Bill Norton; Matt Soraghan
- Home stadium: Briggs Stadium

1987 Gateway Collegiate Athletic Conference football standings
	Conf.					Overall
Team	W		L		T	W		L		T
No. 4 Northern Iowa $^	6	–	0	–	0	10	–	4	–	0
Western Illinois	5	–	1	–	0	7	–	4	–	0
Eastern Illinois	3	–	3	–	0	5	–	6	–	0
SW Missouri State	3	–	3	–	0	5	–	6	–	0
Indiana State	2	–	4	–	0	5	–	6	–	0
Southern Illinois	2	–	4	–	0	3	–	8	–	0
Illinois State	0	–	6	–	0	3	–	7	–	0
$ – Conference champion; ^ – NCAA Division I-AA playoff participant; Rankings from NCAA Division I-AA Football Committee poll

The 1987 Southwest Missouri State Bears football team represented the Southwest Missouri State University (now known as Missouri State University) as a member of the Gateway Collegiate Athletic Conference (GCAC) during the 1987 NCAA Division I-AA football season. Led by second-year head coach Jesse Branch, the Bears compiled an overall record of 5–6, with a mark of 3–3 in conference play, and finished tied for third in the GFC.

== Schedule ==
Date	Time	Opponent	Rank	Site	Result	Attendance	Source
September 5		Central State (OK)*		Briggs Stadium; Springfield, MO	W 20–7		
September 12		at Southern Illinois		McAndrew Stadium; Carbondale, IL	W 18–13	13,100	
September 19		Nicholls State*	No. 18	Briggs Stadium; Springfield, MO	L 18–13	7,820	
September 26		at Western Illinois		Hanson Field; Macomb, IL	L 19–20		
October 3		Indiana State		Briggs Stadium; Springfield, MO	W 42–0	8,105	
October 17	1:00 p.m.	at Northern Illinois*		Huskie Stadium; DeKalb, IL	L 21–27	9,017	
October 24		at Eastern Illinois		O'Brien Field; Charleston, IL	L 3–7	1,203	
October 31		Illinois State^{†}		Briggs Stadium; Springfield, MO	W 31–15	7,855	
November 7	1:30 p.m.	No. 7 Northern Iowa		Briggs Stadium; Springfield, MO	L 13–17	3,343	
November 14		at Louisiana Tech*		Joe Aillet Stadium; Ruston, LA	W 13–10	13,780	
November 21		at Southern*		A. W. Mumford Stadium; Baton Rouge, LA	L 6–8		
*Non-conference game; ^{†}Homecoming; Rankings from NCAA Division I-AA Football Committee Poll released prior to the game; All times are in Central time

== Roster ==
1987 Missouri State Bears football team roster
Players
Coaches
Offense

Pos.	#	Name	Class
WR	9	Doug Adams	Fr
RB	22	Ryan Jackson	Sr
QB	6	David Johnson	So
WR	85	Ken Kelly	Fr
OT	72	Jeff Pickering	So
QB	2	DeAndre Smith	Fr

Defense

Pos.	#	Name	Class
DE	70	Tim Gary	So
DT	99	Joe Lisanti	Jr
DT	66	Tim McDuffey	Fr
DT	68	Rob Robinson	Jr
LB	50	Mike Soraghan	Sr

Special teams

Pos.	#	Name	Class
K	7	Jackson Workman	So

Head coach

Coordinators/assistant coaches

Legend

- (C) Team captain
- (S) Suspended
- (I) Ineligible
- Injured
- Redshirt
