= 1987 Austin Peay Governors football team =

American college football season

1987 Austin Peay Governors football
- Conference: Ohio Valley Conference
- Record: 2–9 (1–5 OVC)
- Head coach: Emory Hale (7th season)
- Home stadium: Municipal Stadium

1987 Ohio Valley Conference football standings
	Conf.					Overall
Team	W		L		T	W		L		T
No. 7 Eastern Kentucky +^	5	–	1	–	0	9	–	3	–	0
No. 15 Youngstown State +^	5	–	1	–	0	8	–	4	–	0
Middle Tennessee	4	–	2	–	0	6	–	5	–	0
Murray State	3	–	3	–	0	6	–	5	–	0
Tennessee Tech	2	–	4	–	0	5	–	6	–	0
Morehead State	1	–	5	–	0	2	–	8	–	0
Austin Peay	1	–	5	–	0	2	–	9	–	0
+ – Conference co-champions; ^ – NCAA Division I-AA playoff participant; Rankings from NCAA Division I-AA Football Committee poll

The 1987 Austin Peay Governors football team represented Austin Peay State University as a member of the Ohio Valley Conference (OVC) during the 1987 NCAA Division I-AA football season. Led by seventh-year head coach Emory Hale, the Governors compiled an overall record of 2–9, with a mark of 1–5 in conference play, and finished tied for sixth in the OVC.

== Schedule ==
Date	Opponent	Site	Result	Attendance	Source
September 5	at Kansas State*	KSU Stadium; Manhattan, KS	W 26–22	23,350	
September 12	at Tennessee–Martin*	Pacer Stadium; Martin, TN	L 10–30	5,900	
September 19	Southern Illinois*	Municipal Stadium; Clarksville, TN	L 3–10	4,913	
September 26	Tennessee Tech	Municipal Stadium; Clarksville, TN	L 9–14		
October 3	at Middle Tennessee	Johnny "Red" Floyd Stadium; Murfreesboro, TN	L 16–38	11,500	
October 10	Morehead State	Municipal Stadium; Clarksville, TN	W 20–13 ^{OT}		
October 17	at Youngstown State	Stambaugh Stadium; Youngstown, OH	L 18–20		
October 24	No. 11 Western Kentucky*	Municipal Stadium; Clarksville, TN	L 0–27	5,833	
October 31	at No. 13 Eastern Kentucky	Hanger Field; Richmond, KY	L 7–50		
November 14	at Cincinnati*	Nippert Stadium; Cincinnati, OH	L 10–42	10,164	
November 21	at Murray State	Roy Stewart Stadium; Murray, KY	L 0–40		
*Non-conference game; Rankings from NCAA Division I-AA Football Committee Poll released prior to the game
