= 1987 Kent State Golden Flashes football team =

American college football season

1987 Kent State Golden Flashes football
- Conference: Mid-American Conference
- Record: 7–4 (5–3 MAC)
- Head coach: Glen Mason (2nd season)
- Home stadium: Dix Stadium

1987 Mid-American Conference football standings
| | Conf. | | | | | Overall |
| Team | W | | L | | T | W | | L | | T |
|---|---|---|---|---|---|---|---|---|---|---|
| Eastern Michigan $ | 7 | – | 1 | – | 0 | 10 | – | 2 | – | 0 |
| Kent State | 5 | – | 3 | – | 0 | 7 | – | 4 | – | 0 |
| Miami (OH) | 5 | – | 3 | – | 0 | 5 | – | 6 | – | 0 |
| Bowling Green | 5 | – | 3 | – | 0 | 5 | – | 6 | – | 0 |
| Western Michigan | 4 | – | 4 | – | 0 | 5 | – | 6 | – | 0 |
| Central Michigan | 3 | – | 4 | – | 1 | 5 | – | 5 | – | 1 |
| Toledo | 3 | – | 4 | – | 1 | 3 | – | 7 | – | 1 |
| Ball State | 3 | – | 5 | – | 0 | 4 | – | 7 | – | 0 |
| Ohio | 0 | – | 8 | – | 0 | 1 | – | 10 | – | 0 |
$ – Conference champion

The 1987 Kent State Golden Flashes football team was an American football team that represented Kent State University in the Mid-American Conference (MAC) during the 1987 NCAA Division I-A football season. In their second and final season under head coach Glen Mason, the Golden Flashes compiled a 7–4 record (5–3 against MAC opponents), finished in a tie for second place in the MAC, and outscored all opponents by a combined total of 233 to 212.

The team's statistical leaders included tailback Eric Wilkerson with 1,221 rushing yards, quarterback Tim Phillips with 1,625 passing yards, and wide receiver Eric Dye with 606 receiving yards. Three Kent State players were selected as first-team All-MAC players: Wilkerson, Dye, and center Chip Curtis.

== Schedule ==
| Date | Opponent | Site | Result | Attendance | Source |
|---|---|---|---|---|---|
| September 12 | at Akron* | Rubber Bowl; Akron, OH (Wagon Wheel) | W 27–23 | 35,187 | |
| September 19 | at Kansas* | Memorial Stadium; Lawrence, KS | W 31–17 | 33,700 | |
| September 26 | Eastern Michigan | Dix Stadium; Kent, OH | L 21–23 | 17,400 | |
| October 3 | Central Michigan | Dix Stadium; Kent, OH | W 24–21 | 10,200 | |
| October 10 | at Ball State | Ball State Stadium; Muncie, IN | L 23–24 | 8,125 | |
| October 17 | Western Michigan | Dix Stadium; Kent, OH | W 27–13 | | |
| October 24 | at Ohio | Peden Stadium; Athens, OH | W 24–10 | 16,742 | |
| October 31 | Toledo | Dix Stadium; Kent, OH | W 17–13 | 18,200 | |
| November 7 | at Bowling Green | Doyt Perry Stadium; Bowling Green, OH (Anniversary Award) | L 20–30 | 20,612 | |
| November 14 | Miami (OH) | Dix Stadium; Kent, OH | W 14–10 | 12,100 | |
| November 21 | at No. 19 Pittsburgh* | Pitt Stadium; Pittsburgh, PA | L 5–28 | 35,472 | |
*Non-conference game; Rankings from AP Poll released prior to the game
