= 1987 Eastern Michigan Hurons football team =

American college football season

1987 Eastern Michigan Hurons football

MAC champion California Bowl champion

California Bowl, W 30–27 vs. San Jose State
- Conference: Mid-American Conference
- Record: 10–2 (7–1 MAC)
- Head coach: Jim Harkema (5th season)
- Home stadium: Rynearson Stadium

1987 Mid-American Conference football standings
	Conf.					Overall
Team	W		L		T	W		L		T
Eastern Michigan $	7	–	1	–	0	10	–	2	–	0
Kent State	5	–	3	–	0	7	–	4	–	0
Miami (OH)	5	–	3	–	0	5	–	6	–	0
Bowling Green	5	–	3	–	0	5	–	6	–	0
Western Michigan	4	–	4	–	0	5	–	6	–	0
Central Michigan	3	–	4	–	1	5	–	5	–	1
Toledo	3	–	4	–	1	3	–	7	–	1
Ball State	3	–	5	–	0	4	–	7	–	0
Ohio	0	–	8	–	0	1	–	10	–	0
$ – Conference champion

The 1987 Eastern Michigan Hurons football team represented Eastern Michigan University during the 1987 NCAA Division I-A football season. Eastern Michigan competed as a member of the Mid-American Conference (MAC), was coached by Jim Harkema, and played their homes game at Rynearson Stadium. They finished the season 10–2 overall and 7–1 in MAC play while winning the MAC championship. It was their first conference team since joining the MAC and first overall since winning the Illinois Intercollegiate Athletic Conference in 1957. The Hurons went to the 1987 California Bowl (their first bowl appearance since joining Division I and first since the 1971 Pioneer Bowl) and upset 17 1/2 point favorite San Jose State for their first bowl win in EMU history. It is the first and so far only time Eastern Michigan has had a ten win season along with their last bowl appearance until 2016.

== Schedule ==
Date	Opponent	Site	TV	Result	Attendance	Source
September 5	Youngstown State*	Rynearson Stadium; Ypsilanti, MI		W 35–20	17,252	
September 12	at Miami (OH)	Yager Stadium; Oxford, OH		W 33–17	17,788	
September 19	at Akron*	Rubber Bowl; Akron, OH		L 16–17	10,032	
September 26	at Kent State	Dix Stadium; Kent, OH		W 23–21	17,400	
October 3	Northern Illinois*	Rynearson Stadium; Ypsilanti, MI		W 32–31	13,306	
October 10	at Central Michigan	Kelly/Shorts Stadium; Mount Pleasant, MI (rivalry)		L 6–16	25,906	
October 17	Ball State^{†}	Rynearson Stadium; Ypsilanti, MI		W 35–28	17,201	
October 24	at Western Michigan	Waldo Stadium; Kalamazoo, MI		W 23–17	9,472	
October 31	Ohio	Rynearson Stadium; Ypsilanti, MI		W 34–16	11,763	
November 5	at Toledo	Glass Bowl; Toledo, OH	ESPN	W 38–9	17,041	
November 14	Bowling Green	Rynearson Stadium; Ypsilanti, MI		W 38–18	20,205	
December 12	vs. San Jose State*	Bulldog Stadium; Fresno, CA (California Bowl)	ESPN	W 30–27	24,000	
*Non-conference game; ^{†}Homecoming

== Coaching staff ==
Name	Position	Year at school
Jim Harkema	Head coach	5th

== After the season ==
The following Huron was selected in the 1988 NFL draft after the season.

Round	Pick	Player	Position	NFL club
7	172	Gary Patton	Running back	New York Jets
