= 1987 Montana State Bobcats football team =

American college football season

1987 Montana State Bobcats football
- Conference: Big Sky Conference
- Record: 1–10 (0–8 Big Sky)
- Head coach: Earle Solomonson (1st season)
- Home stadium: Sales Stadium

1987 Big Sky Conference football standings
	Conf.					Overall
Team	W		L		T	W		L		T
No. 5 Idaho $^	7	–	1	–	0	9	–	3	–	0
No. 10 Weber State ^	7	–	1	–	0	10	–	3	–	0
Montana	5	–	3	–	0	6	–	5	–	0
Boise State	4	–	4	–	0	6	–	5	–	0
Nevada	4	–	4	–	0	5	–	6	–	0
Northern Arizona	4	–	4	–	0	7	–	4	–	0
Idaho State	3	–	5	–	0	3	–	7	–	1
Eastern Washington	2	–	6	–	0	4	–	7	–	0
Montana State	0	–	8	–	0	1	–	10	–	0
$ – Conference champion; ^ – NCAA Division I-AA playoff participant; Rankings from NCAA Division I-AA Poll

The 1987 Montana State Bobcats football team was an American football team that represented Montana State University in the Big Sky Conference during the 1987 NCAA Division I-AA football season. In their first season under head coach Earle Solomonson, the Bobcats compiled a 1–10 record (0–8 against Big Sky opponents) and finished last in the Big Sky.

== Schedule ==
Date	Opponent	Site	Result	Attendance	Source
September 5	at Long Beach State*	Veterans Memorial Stadium; Long Beach, CA	L 15–51	3,606	
September 12	No. T–13 Sam Houston State*	Sales Stadium; Bozeman, MT	W 52–48	7,357	
September 19	at No. 12 Northern Iowa*	UNI-Dome; Cedar Falls, IA	L 7–53	14,213	
September 26	Eastern Washington	Sales Stadium; Bozeman, MT	L 30–32	11,187	
October 3	at Boise State	Bronco Stadium; Boise, ID	L 13–35	19,638	
October 10	at No. 19 Nevada	Mackay Stadium; Reno, NV	L 13–31	13,903	
October 17	No. 13 Weber State^{†}	Sales Stadium; Bozeman, MT	L 32–35	12,397	
October 24	at Northern Arizona	Walkup Skydome; Flagstaff, AZ	L 21–54	13,856	
October 31	Montana	Sales Stadium; Bozeman, MT (rivalry)	L 7–55	17,027	
November 7	No. 10 Idaho	Sales Stadium; Bozeman, MT	L 7–14	6,007	
November 14	at Idaho State	ASISU Minidome; Pocatello, ID	L 33–52	6,050	
*Non-conference game; ^{†}Homecoming; Rankings from NCAA Division I-AA Football Committee Poll released prior to the game
