= Moe Ankney =

American football player and coach (born 1942)

Biographical details
- Born: June 23, 1942 (age 84); Xenia, Ohio, U.S.

Playing career
- 1962–1963: Bowling Green
- Position: Quarterback

Coaching career (HC unless noted)
- 1971–1975: Ball State (DB)
- 1976–1979: Tulane (DC/DB)
- 1980–1985: Arizona (AHC/DC/AB)
- 1986–1990: Bowling Green
- 1991–1993: Purdue (DC)
- 1994–2000: Missouri (DC)
- 2001–2002: Minnesota (DC/DB)
- 2003–2005: Minnesota (AHC/DE)

Head coaching record
- Overall: 20–31–3

Howard "Moe" Ankney (born June 23, 1942) is an American former football player and coach. He served as the head football coach at the Bowling Green State University from 1986 to 1990, compiling a record of 20–31–3. Ankney played college football as a quarterback at Bowling Green, from which he graduated in 1964. There he played on the 1962 Mid-American Conference championship team coached by Doyt Perry. After coaching high school football in Ohio from 1964 to 1970, Ankney moved to the college ranks. In addition to his head coaching stint at his alma mater, he served as a defensive assistant at Ball State University, Tulane University, the University of Arizona, Purdue University, the University of Missouri, and the University of Minnesota. He currently resides in Oregon and is an avid golfer. He has three kids Angie, Molly and Andy. He has six grandchildren Ashley, Bryce, Collin, Hannah, Drew and Jack.

== Head coaching record ==
Year	Team	Overall	Conference	Standing	Bowl/playoffs
Bowling Green Falcons (Mid-American Conference) (1986–1990)
1986	Bowling Green	5–6	5–3	T–2nd	
1987	Bowling Green	5–6	5–3	T–2nd	
1988	Bowling Green	2–8–1	1–6–1	8th	
1989	Bowling Green	5–6	5–3	5th	
1990	Bowling Green	3–5–2	2–4–2	6th	
Bowling Green:		20–31–3	18–19–3		
Total:		20–31–3			
