= 1987 Western Michigan Broncos football team =

American college football season

1987 Western Michigan Broncos football
- Conference: Mid-American Conference
- Record: 5–6 (4–4 MAC)
- Head coach: Al Molde (1st season)
- Defensive coordinator: Larry Edlund (1st season)
- Home stadium: Waldo Stadium

1987 Mid-American Conference football standings
	Conf.					Overall
Team	W		L		T	W		L		T
Eastern Michigan $	7	–	1	–	0	10	–	2	–	0
Kent State	5	–	3	–	0	7	–	4	–	0
Miami (OH)	5	–	3	–	0	5	–	6	–	0
Bowling Green	5	–	3	–	0	5	–	6	–	0
Western Michigan	4	–	4	–	0	5	–	6	–	0
Central Michigan	3	–	4	–	1	5	–	5	–	1
Toledo	3	–	4	–	1	3	–	7	–	1
Ball State	3	–	5	–	0	4	–	7	–	0
Ohio	0	–	8	–	0	1	–	10	–	0
$ – Conference champion

The 1987 Western Michigan Broncos football team represented Western Michigan University in the Mid-American Conference (MAC) during the 1987 NCAA Division I-A football season. In their first season under head coach Al Molde, the Broncos compiled a 5–6 record (4–4 against MAC opponents), finished in fifth place in the MAC, and were outscored by their opponents, 240 to 218. The team played its home games at Waldo Stadium in Kalamazoo, Michigan.

The team's statistical leaders included Dave Kruse with 1,592 passing yards, Robert Davis with 477 rushing yards, and Jamie Hence with 858 receiving yards.

On December 17, 1986, Molde was named as Western's new head football coach. He had been head football coach at Eastern Illinois from 1983 to 1986 and led that team to an 11–2 record in 1986.

== Schedule ==
Date	Opponent	Site	Result	Attendance	Source
September 5	Akron*	Waldo Stadium; Kalamazoo, MI	W 24–19	15,378	
September 12	at Illinois State*	Hancock Stadium; Normal, IL	L 6–20		
September 19	Northern Illinois*	Waldo Stadium; Kalamazoo, MI	L 14–34	12,005	
September 26	at Bowling Green	Doyt Perry Stadium; Bowling Green, OH	W 34–27	18,054	
October 3	Toledo	Waldo Stadium; Kalamazoo, MI	W 21–14		
October 10	Miami (OH)	Waldo Stadium; Kalamazoo, MI	L 0–17	13,395	
October 17	at Kent State	Dix Stadium; Kent, OH	L 13–27		
October 24	Eastern Michigan	Waldo Stadium; Kalamazoo, MI	L 17–23	9,472	
October 31	at Central Michigan	Kelly/Shorts Stadium; Mount Pleasant, MI (rivalry)	L 27–30	25,151	
November 7	Ball State	Waldo Stadium; Kalamazoo, MI	W 31–16	7,254	
November 21	at Ohio	Peden Stadium; Athens, OH	W 31–13	2,100	
*Non-conference game
