= Brian Mitchell (kicker) =

American football player (born 1969)

Profile
- Position: Placekicker

Personal information
- Born: October 15, 1969 (age 57)
- Listed height: 5 ft 6 in (1.68 m)
- Listed weight: 170 lb (77 kg)

Career information
- College: Marshall (1987); Northern Iowa (1989–1991)

Career history
- Cleveland Thunderbolts (1994); St. Louis Stampede (1995)
- Stats at ArenaFan.com

Brian Mitchell (born October 15, 1969) is an American former college football and professional arena football player.

== Career ==
Mitchell played college football for the Marshall Thundering Herd in 1987 and the Northern Iowa Panthers (UNI) from 1989 to 1991. He holds many UNI football records and NCAA records as well, including the most accurate single-season kicker in NCAA college football history (26 for 27 in field goals). His longest field goal was 57 yards in 1990. He was a member of the Marshall squad that competed in the 1987 NCAA Division I-AA Football Championship Game. Mitchell was named number six on the Football Championship Subdivision (FCS; formerly Division I-AA) Top 30 Kickers all-time list between 1978 and 2008.

Mitchell played two years of professional football in the Arena Football League, in 1994 for the Cleveland Thunderbolts and in 1995 for the St. Louis Stampede. Mitchell kicked 6 drop kick field goals and 18 drop kick extra points in 1994. Mitchell holds every drop kick record in the Arena Football League. In 2024, Mitchell was inducted into the University of Northern Iowa Athletics Hall of Fame.
