= 1987 Indiana State Sycamores football team =

American college football season

1987 Indiana State Sycamores football
- Conference: Gateway Collegiate Athletic Conference
- Record: 5–6 (2–4 GCAC)
- Head coach: Dennis Raetz (8th season)
- Home stadium: Memorial Stadium

1987 Gateway Collegiate Athletic Conference football standings
	Conf.					Overall
Team	W		L		T	W		L		T
No. 4 Northern Iowa $^	6	–	0	–	0	10	–	4	–	0
Western Illinois	5	–	1	–	0	7	–	4	–	0
Eastern Illinois	3	–	3	–	0	5	–	6	–	0
SW Missouri State	3	–	3	–	0	5	–	6	–	0
Indiana State	2	–	4	–	0	5	–	6	–	0
Southern Illinois	2	–	4	–	0	3	–	8	–	0
Illinois State	0	–	6	–	0	3	–	7	–	0
$ – Conference champion; ^ – NCAA Division I-AA playoff participant; Rankings from NCAA Division I-AA Football Committee poll

The 1987 Indiana State Sycamores football team represented Indiana State University as a member of the Gateway Collegiate Athletic Conference (GCAC) during the 1987 NCAA Division I-AA football season. The team was led by eighth-year head coach Dennis Raetz and played their home games at Memorial Stadium in Terre Haute, Indiana. The Sycamores finished the season with a 5–6 record overall and a 2–4 record in conference play.

== Schedule ==
Date	Opponent	Site	Result	Attendance	Source
September 5	Salem*	Memorial Stadium; Terre Haute, IN	W 55–0		
September 12	Boston University*	Memorial Stadium; Terre Haute, IN	L 0–34		
September 19	at Western Illinois	Hanson Field; Macomb, IL	L 12–42		
September 26	No. 6 Northern Iowa	Memorial Stadium; Terre Haute, IN	L 14–38	8,457	
October 3	at Southwest Missouri State	Briggs Stadium; Springfield, MO	L 0–42	8,105	
October 10	at Georgia Tech*	Grant Field; Atlanta, GA	L 0–38	30,039	
October 17	at Eastern Illinois	O'Brien Field; Charleston, IL	L 14–20	9,734	
October 24	at Illinois State	Hancock Stadium; Normal, IL	W 10–3		
October 31	Southern Illinois^{†}	Memorial Stadium; Terre Haute, IN	W 24–15	10,531	
November 7	vs. Cincinnati*	Hoosier Dome; Indianapolis, IN	W 40–16	5,424	
November 21	vs. Ball State*	Hoosier Dome; Indianapolis, IN (Blue Key Victory Bell)	W 24–23	7,323	
*Non-conference game; ^{†}Homecoming; Rankings from NCAA Division I-AA Football Committee Poll released prior to the game
