= 1987 Nevada Wolf Pack football team =

American college football season

1987 Nevada Wolf Pack football
- Conference: Big Sky Conference
- Record: 5–6 (4–4 Big Sky)
- Head coach: Chris Ault (12th season)
- Home stadium: Mackay Stadium

1987 Big Sky Conference football standings
	Conf.					Overall
Team	W		L		T	W		L		T
No. 5 Idaho $^	7	–	1	–	0	9	–	3	–	0
No. 10 Weber State ^	7	–	1	–	0	10	–	3	–	0
Montana	5	–	3	–	0	6	–	5	–	0
Boise State	4	–	4	–	0	6	–	5	–	0
Nevada	4	–	4	–	0	5	–	6	–	0
Northern Arizona	4	–	4	–	0	7	–	4	–	0
Idaho State	3	–	5	–	0	3	–	7	–	1
Eastern Washington	2	–	6	–	0	4	–	7	–	0
Montana State	0	–	8	–	0	1	–	10	–	0
$ – Conference champion; ^ – NCAA Division I-AA playoff participant; Rankings from NCAA Division I-AA Poll

The 1987 Nevada Wolf Pack football team was an American football team that represented the University of Nevada, Reno during the 1987 NCAA Division I-AA football season. Nevada competed as a member of the Big Sky Conference (BSC). The Wolf Pack were led by 12th-year head coach Chris Ault and played its home games at Mackay Stadium. The team was ranked No. 1 early in the season but finished with a 5–6 record – the program's first losing season under Ault.

== Schedule ==
Date	Time	Opponent	Rank	Site	Result	Attendance	Source
September 12		at Eastern Washington	No. 6	Joe Albi Stadium; Spokane, WA	W 40–26	3,899	
September 19		No. 7 UC Davis*	No. 1	Mackay Stadium; Reno, NV	W 34–17	15,630	
September 26		at Montana	No. 1	Washington–Grizzly Stadium; Missoula, MT	L 29–41	8,200	
October 3		at UNLV*	No. 6	Sam Boyd Silver Bowl; East Las Vegas, NV (Fremont Cannon)	L 19–24		
October 10		Montana State	No. 19	Mackay Stadium; Reno, NV	W 31–13	13,903	
October 17	1:00 p.m.	at Idaho	No. 11	Kibbie Dome; Moscow, ID	L 28–38	15,100	
October 24		Stephen F. Austin*^{†}		Mackay Stadium; Reno, NV	L 7–9	14,577	
October 31		Idaho State		Mackay Stadium; Reno, NV	W 40–19	11,236	
November 7		Boise State		Mackay Stadium; Reno, NV (rivalry)	L 31–36	18,150	
November 14		Weber State		Mackay Stadium; Reno, NV	L 15–38	11,143	
November 21		at Northern Arizona		Walkup Skydome; Flagstaff, AZ	W 40–39	10,123	
*Non-conference game; ^{†}Homecoming; Rankings from NCAA Division I-AA Football Committee Poll released prior to the game; All times are in Pacific time

== Preseason ==
The Wolf Pack finished the 1986 season with a 13–1 record and 7–0 in BSC play to finish in first place, losing the Division I-AA semifinals against the eventual national champion Georgia Southern. The Wolf Pack returned 12 starters from the 1986 team and was ranked No. 1 in pre-season selections by Division I-AA sports information directors and by Don Heinrich's College Football '87 magazine. The team was also a near-unanimous, pre-season pick to repeat as the Big Sky champion.

== Key players ==
Placekicker Marty Zendejas broke the Division I-AA career kick-scoring record previously held by brother Tony Zendejas. Zendejas finished his college career with 385 points scored and was the only Division I-AA player selected by the Football Writers Association of America as a first-team honoree on the 1987 All-America college football team.

Junior running back Charvez Foger led the team with 1,132 rushing yards and 12 touchdowns. His career total of 3,200 rushing yards ranked third in Big Sky history at the end of the 1987 season. Foger was named to the All-Big Sky football team for the third consecutive season in 1987. Foger concluded his college career in 1988 with 4,486 rushing yards, the third best mark in Division I-AA history.

Jim Zaccheo, a junior college transfer from California, won the starting quarterback job after pre-season competition with Andy Genasci. He led the team with 2,158 passing yards.

Split end Tony Logan set school records with 64 catches, 1,099 receiving yards, and 12 receiving touchdowns. He was selected as a second-team player on the All-Big Sky team.

On defense, Scott Lommori led the team with 125 total tackles. Senior linebacker Jeff Davis led the team with 12 sacks and 20 tackles for loss and was a unanimous selection for the All-Big Sky team. Sophomore defensive back Bernard Ellison had six interceptions and seven deflections and was also a first-team All-Big Sky selection.
