= 1987 Toledo Rockets football team =

American college football season

1987 Toledo Rockets football
- Conference: Mid-American Conference
- Record: 3–7–1 (3–4–1 MAC)
- Head coach: Dan Simrell (6th season)
- Home stadium: Glass Bowl

1987 Mid-American Conference football standings
	Conf.					Overall
Team	W		L		T	W		L		T
Eastern Michigan $	7	–	1	–	0	10	–	2	–	0
Kent State	5	–	3	–	0	7	–	4	–	0
Miami (OH)	5	–	3	–	0	5	–	6	–	0
Bowling Green	5	–	3	–	0	5	–	6	–	0
Western Michigan	4	–	4	–	0	5	–	6	–	0
Central Michigan	3	–	4	–	1	5	–	5	–	1
Toledo	3	–	4	–	1	3	–	7	–	1
Ball State	3	–	5	–	0	4	–	7	–	0
Ohio	0	–	8	–	0	1	–	10	–	0
$ – Conference champion

The 1987 Toledo Rockets football team was an American football team that represented the University of Toledo in the Mid-American Conference (MAC) during the 1987 NCAA Division I-A football season. In their sixth season under head coach Dan Simrell, the Rockets compiled a 3–7–1 record (3–4–1 against MAC opponents), finished in a tie for sixth place in the MAC, and were outscored by all opponents by a combined total of 245 to 165.

The team's statistical leaders included Bill Bergan with 908 passing yards, David Rohrs with 681 rushing yards, and Eric Hutchinson with 431 receiving yards.

== Schedule ==
Date	Opponent	Site	Result	Attendance	Source
September 5	Temple*	Glass Bowl; Toledo, OH	L 12–13	18,191	
September 12	Ball State	Glass Bowl; Toledo, OH	W 21–17	18,057	
September 19	Ohio	Glass Bowl; Toledo, OH	W 17–12		
October 3	at Western Michigan	Waldo Stadium; Kalamazoo, MI	L 14–21		
October 10	at Northern Illinois*	Huskie Stadium; DeKalb, IL	L 5–41	20,939	
October 17	at Bowling Green	Doyt Perry Stadium; Bowling Green, OH (rivalry)	L 6–20		
October 24	Miami (OH)	Glass Bowl; Toledo, OH	W 37–25	18,485	
October 31	at Kent State	Dix Stadium; Kent, OH	L 13–17	18,200	
November 5	Eastern Michigan	Glass Bowl; Toledo, OH	L 9–38	17,041	
November 14	at Central Michigan	Kelly/Shorts Stadium; Mount Pleasant, MI	T 17–17	14,705	
November 21	at No. 3 Miami (FL)*	Miami Orange Bowl; Miami, FL	L 14–24	37,010	
*Non-conference game; Rankings from AP Poll released prior to the game
