= 1987 Tennessee Tech Golden Eagles football team =

American college football season

1987 Tennessee Tech Golden Eagles football
- Conference: Ohio Valley Conference
- Record: 5–6 (2–4 OVC)
- Head coach: Jim Ragland (2nd season)
- Home stadium: Tucker Stadium

1987 Ohio Valley Conference football standings
	Conf.					Overall
Team	W		L		T	W		L		T
No. 7 Eastern Kentucky +^	5	–	1	–	0	9	–	3	–	0
No. 15 Youngstown State +^	5	–	1	–	0	8	–	4	–	0
Middle Tennessee	4	–	2	–	0	6	–	5	–	0
Murray State	3	–	3	–	0	6	–	5	–	0
Tennessee Tech	2	–	4	–	0	5	–	6	–	0
Morehead State	1	–	5	–	0	2	–	8	–	0
Austin Peay	1	–	5	–	0	2	–	9	–	0
+ – Conference co-champions; ^ – NCAA Division I-AA playoff participant; Rankings from NCAA Division I-AA Football Committee poll

The 1987 Tennessee Tech Golden Eagles football team represented Tennessee Technological University (commonly referred to as Tennessee Tech) as a member of the Ohio Valley Conference (OVC) during the 1987 NCAA Division I-AA football season. Led by second-year head coach Jim Ragland, the Golden Eagles compiled an overall record of 5–6, with a mark of 2–4 in conference play, and finished fifth in the OVC.

== Schedule ==
Date	Opponent	Site	Result	Attendance	Source
September 12	Liberty*	Tucker Stadium; Cookeville, TN	W 43–23	9,356	
September 19	at Abilene Christian*	Shotwell Stadium; Abilene, TX	L 31–40		
September 26	at Austin Peay	Municipal Stadium; Clarksville, TN	W 14–9		
October 3	Arkansas–Pine Bluff*	Tucker Stadium; Cookeville, TN	W 49–6		
October 10	Youngstown State	Tucker Stadium; Cookeville, TN	L 15–18		
October 17	at Morehead State	Jayne Stadium; Morehead, KY	W 52–14	7,000	
October 24	Murray State	Tucker Stadium; Cookeville, TN	L 21–24		
October 31	at Cincinnati*	Nippert Stadium; Cincinnati, OH	L 17–38		
November 7	No. 11 Eastern Kentucky	Tucker Stadium; Cookeville, TN	L 8–44		
November 14	at Chattanooga*	Chamberlain Field; Chattanooga, TN	W 20–13	7,573	
November 21	Middle Tennessee	Tucker Stadium; Cookeville, TN	L 13–17	8,570	
*Non-conference game; Rankings from NCAA Division I-AA Football Committee Poll released prior to the game
