= 1987 Murray State Racers football team =

American college football season

1987 Murray State Racers football
- Conference: Ohio Valley Conference
- Record: 6–5 (3–3 OVC)
- Head coach: Mike Mahoney (1st season)
- Home stadium: Roy Stewart Stadium

1987 Ohio Valley Conference football standings
	Conf.					Overall
Team	W		L		T	W		L		T
No. 7 Eastern Kentucky +^	5	–	1	–	0	9	–	3	–	0
No. 15 Youngstown State +^	5	–	1	–	0	8	–	4	–	0
Middle Tennessee	4	–	2	–	0	6	–	5	–	0
Murray State	3	–	3	–	0	6	–	5	–	0
Tennessee Tech	2	–	4	–	0	5	–	6	–	0
Morehead State	1	–	5	–	0	2	–	8	–	0
Austin Peay	1	–	5	–	0	2	–	9	–	0
+ – Conference co-champions; ^ – NCAA Division I-AA playoff participant; Rankings from NCAA Division I-AA Football Committee poll

The 1987 Murray State Racers football team represented Murray State University during the 1987 NCAA Division I-AA football season as a member of the Ohio Valley Conference (OVC). Led by first-year head coach Mike Mahoney, the Racers compiled an overall record of 6–5, with a mark of 3–3 in conference play, and finished fourth in the OVC.

== Schedule ==
Date	Opponent	Rank	Site	Result	Attendance	Source
September 5	Tennessee–Martin*		Roy Stewart Stadium; Murray, KY	W 34–6		
September 12	Southeast Missouri State*		Roy Stewart Stadium; Murray, KY	W 30–12		
September 19	at Western Kentucky*	No. 3	L. T. Smith Stadium; Bowling Green, KY (rivalry)	L 17–21	19,250	
September 26	at Louisville*		Cardinal Stadium; Louisville, KY	L 10–34	29,231	
October 10	at No. 5 Eastern Kentucky		Hanger Field; Richmond, KY	L 21–29		
October 17	Liberty*		Roy Stewart Stadium; Murray, KY	W 34–12	4,560	
October 24	at Tennessee Tech		Tucker Stadium; Cookeville, TN	W 24–21		
October 31	Morehead State		Roy Stewart Stadium; Murray, KY	W 53–15	10,211	
November 7	at Youngstown State		Stambaugh Stadium; Youngstown, OH	L 13–20		
November 14	at Middle Tennessee		Johnny "Red" Floyd Stadium; Murfreesboro, TN	L 9–27		
November 21	Austin Peay		Roy Stewart Stadium; Murray, KY	W 40–0		
*Non-conference game; Rankings from NCAA Division I-AA Football Committee Poll released prior to the game
