= Jim Ragland =

American football player and coach (1940–2006)

Biographical details
- Born: November 12, 1940; Cookeville, Tennessee, U.S.
- Died: May 16, 2006 (aged 65); Cookeville, Tennessee, U.S.

Playing career
- 1959–1960: Ole Miss
- 1961–1963: Tennessee Tech
- Position: Quarterback

Coaching career (HC unless noted)
- 1965–1966: West Virginia (assistant)
- 1967–1969: West Virginia (scout)
- 1970–1972: Texas Tech (assistant)
- 1973–1974: Tampa (OC)
- 1975–1979: Memphis (OC)
- 1984: Tennessee Tech (RC)
- 1985: Tennessee Tech (OC)
- 1986–1995: Tennessee Tech

Head coaching record
- Overall: 42–66

Accomplishments and honors

Awards
- 2× OVC Coach of the Year (1992–1993)

James Donald Ragland (November 12, 1940 – May 16, 2006) was an American college football player and coach. He served as the head coach at Tennessee Technological University from 1986 to 1995, compiling a record of 42–66.

== Head coaching record ==
Year	Team	Overall	Conference	Standing	Bowl/playoffs	TSN^{#}
Tennessee Tech Golden Eagles (Ohio Valley Conference) (1986–1995)
1986	Tennessee Tech	0–10	0–7	8th		
1987	Tennessee Tech	5–6	2–4	5th		
1988	Tennessee Tech	1–10	1–5	7th		
1989	Tennessee Tech	5–5	3–3	T–3rd		
1990	Tennessee Tech	6–5	3–3	T–4th		
1991	Tennessee Tech	2–9	2–5	T–6th		
1992	Tennessee Tech	7–4	6–2	3rd		
1993	Tennessee Tech	8–3	7–1	2nd		22
1994	Tennessee Tech	5–6	3–5	T–6th		
1995	Tennessee Tech	3–8	2–6	T–6th		
Tennessee Tech:		42–66	29–41			
Total:		42–66				
