= 1987 Morehead State Eagles football team =

American college football season

1987 Morehead State Eagles football
- Conference: Ohio Valley Conference
- Record: 2–8 (1–5 OVC)
- Head coach: Bill Baldridge (4th season)
- Home stadium: Jayne Stadium

1987 Ohio Valley Conference football standings
	Conf.					Overall
Team	W		L		T	W		L		T
No. 7 Eastern Kentucky +^	5	–	1	–	0	9	–	3	–	0
No. 15 Youngstown State +^	5	–	1	–	0	8	–	4	–	0
Middle Tennessee	4	–	2	–	0	6	–	5	–	0
Murray State	3	–	3	–	0	6	–	5	–	0
Tennessee Tech	2	–	4	–	0	5	–	6	–	0
Morehead State	1	–	5	–	0	2	–	8	–	0
Austin Peay	1	–	5	–	0	2	–	9	–	0
+ – Conference co-champions; ^ – NCAA Division I-AA playoff participant; Rankings from NCAA Division I-AA Football Committee poll

The 1987 Morehead State Eagles football team represented Morehead State University as a member of the Ohio Valley Conference (OVC) during the 1987 NCAA Division I-AA football season. Led by fourth-year head coach Bill Baldridge, the Eagles compiled an overall record of 2–8, with a mark of 1–5 in conference play, and finished tied for sixth in the OVC.

== Schedule ==
Date	Opponent	Site	Result	Attendance	Source
September 5	at Marshall*	Fairfield Stadium; Huntington, WV	L 0–29	15,049	
September 12	Kentucky State*	Jayne Stadium; Morehead, KY	W 37–0		
September 19	at James Madison*	JMU Stadium; Harrisonburg, VA	L 10–44	3,100	
September 26	Southern Arkansas*	Jayne Stadium; Morehead, KY	L 23–38		
October 10	at Austin Peay	Municipal Stadium; Clarksville, TN	L 13–20 ^{OT}		
October 17	Tennessee Tech	Jayne Stadium; Morehead, KY	L 14–52	7,000	
October 31	at Murray State	Roy Stewart Stadium; Murray, KY	L 15–53	10,211	
November 7	Middle Tennessee	Jayne Stadium; Morehead, KY	W 7–3		
November 14	at No. T–20 Youngstown State	Stambaugh Stadium; Youngstown, OH	L 14–38		
November 21	No. 7 Eastern Kentucky	Jayne Stadium; Morehead, KY (rivalry)	L 0–23	7,500	
*Non-conference game; Rankings from NCAA Division I-AA Football Committee Poll released prior to the game
