= 1987 Ball State Cardinals football team =

American college football season

1987 Ball State Cardinals football
- Conference: Mid-American Conference
- Record: 4–7 (3–5 MAC)
- Head coach: Paul Schudel (3rd season)
- Offensive coordinator: Greg Meyer (1st season)
- Home stadium: Ball State Stadium

1987 Mid-American Conference football standings
	Conf.					Overall
Team	W		L		T	W		L		T
Eastern Michigan $	7	–	1	–	0	10	–	2	–	0
Kent State	5	–	3	–	0	7	–	4	–	0
Miami (OH)	5	–	3	–	0	5	–	6	–	0
Bowling Green	5	–	3	–	0	5	–	6	–	0
Western Michigan	4	–	4	–	0	5	–	6	–	0
Central Michigan	3	–	4	–	1	5	–	5	–	1
Toledo	3	–	4	–	1	3	–	7	–	1
Ball State	3	–	5	–	0	4	–	7	–	0
Ohio	0	–	8	–	0	1	–	10	–	0
$ – Conference champion

The 1987 Ball State Cardinals football team was an American football team that represented Ball State University in the Mid-American Conference (MAC) during the 1987 NCAA Division I-A football season. In its third season under head coach Paul Schudel, the team compiled an 4–7 record (3–5 against conference opponents) and finished in eighth place out of nine teams in the MAC. The team played its home games at Ball State Stadium in Muncie, Indiana.

The team's statistical leaders included Wade Kosakowski with 1,477 passing yards, Bernie Parmalee with 1,064 rushing yards and 90 points scored, and Deon Chester with 838 receiving yards.

== Schedule ==
Date	Opponent	Site	Result	Attendance	Source
September 12	at Toledo	Glass Bowl; Toledo, OH	L 17–21	18,057	
September 19	Bowling Green	Ball State Stadium; Muncie, IN	L 0–24	11,750	
September 26	at Wisconsin*	Camp Randall Stadium; Madison, WI	L 13–30	51,825	
October 3	at Miami (OH)	Yager Stadium; Oxford, OH	L 20–30	16,762	
October 10	Kent State	Ball State Stadium; Muncie, IN	W 24–23	8,125	
October 17	at Eastern Michigan	Rynearson Stadium; Ypsilanti, MI	L 28–35	17,201	
October 24	Central Michigan	Ball State Stadium; Muncie, IN	W 13–3	3,525	
October 31	Northern Illinois*	Ball State Stadium; Muncie, IN (rivalry)	W 42–17	4,675	
November 7	at Western Michigan	Waldo Stadium; Kalamazoo, MI	L 16–31	7,254	
November 14	Ohio	Ball State Stadium; Muncie, IN	W 30–17	6,240	
November 21	vs. Indiana State*	Hoosier Dome; Indianapolis, IN (Blue Key Victory Bell)	L 23–24	7,323	
*Non-conference game
