= 1987 Eastern Illinois Panthers football team =

American college football season

1987 Eastern Illinois Panthers football
- Conference: Gateway Collegiate Athletic Conference
- Record: 5–6 (3–3 GCAC)
- Head coach: Bob Spoo (1st season)
- Offensive coordinator: Kit Cartwright (1st season)
- Home stadium: O'Brien Stadium

1987 Gateway Collegiate Athletic Conference football standings
	Conf.					Overall
Team	W		L		T	W		L		T
No. 4 Northern Iowa $^	6	–	0	–	0	10	–	4	–	0
Western Illinois	5	–	1	–	0	7	–	4	–	0
Eastern Illinois	3	–	3	–	0	5	–	6	–	0
SW Missouri State	3	–	3	–	0	5	–	6	–	0
Indiana State	2	–	4	–	0	5	–	6	–	0
Southern Illinois	2	–	4	–	0	3	–	8	–	0
Illinois State	0	–	6	–	0	3	–	7	–	0
$ – Conference champion; ^ – NCAA Division I-AA playoff participant; Rankings from NCAA Division I-AA Football Committee poll

The 1987 Eastern Illinois Panthers football team represented Eastern Illinois University as a member of the Gateway Collegiate Athletic Conference (GCAC) during the 1987 NCAA Division I-AA football season. The Panthers played their home games at O'Brien Stadium in Charleston, Illinois. Led by first-year head coach Bob Spoo, Eastern Illinois compiled an overall record of 5–6 with a mark of 3–3 in conference play, tying for third in the GCAC.

== Schedule ==
Date	Opponent	Rank	Site	Result	Attendance	Source
September 5	at San Jose State*		Spartan Stadium; San Jose, CA	L 3–24		
September 12	at Northeast Missouri State*		Stokes Stadium; Kirksville, MO	W 16–10		
September 19	No. T–14 Illinois State		O'Brien Field; Charleston, IL (rivalry)	W 15–9		
September 26	at Liberty*		City Stadium; Lynchburg, VA	W 17–14	6,100	
October 3	at Akron*	No. 14	Rubber Bowl; Akron, OH	L 10–24	12,524	
October 10	No. 13 Western Illinois		O'Brien Field; Charleston, IL	L 12–21	2,413	
October 17	Indiana State^{†}		O'Brien Field; Charleston, IL	W 20–14	9,734	
October 24	Southwest Missouri State		O'Brien Field; Charleston, IL	W 7–3	1,203	
October 31	at No. 10 Northern Iowa		UNI-Dome; Cedar Falls, IA	L 17–19	13,203	
November 7	Southern Illinois		O'Brien Field; Charleston, IL	L 27–32	11,485	
November 14	at No. 14 Western Kentucky*		L. T. Smith Stadium; Bowling Green, KY	L 15–30	8,000	
*Non-conference game; ^{†}Homecoming; Rankings from NCAA Division I-AA Football Committee Poll released prior to the game
