= 1987 Boise State Broncos football team =

American college football season

1987 Boise State Broncos football
- Conference: Big Sky Conference
- Record: 6–5 (4–4 Big Sky)
- Head coach: Skip Hall (1st season)
- Home stadium: Bronco Stadium

1987 Big Sky Conference football standings
	Conf.					Overall
Team	W		L		T	W		L		T
No. 5 Idaho $^	7	–	1	–	0	9	–	3	–	0
No. 10 Weber State ^	7	–	1	–	0	10	–	3	–	0
Montana	5	–	3	–	0	6	–	5	–	0
Boise State	4	–	4	–	0	6	–	5	–	0
Nevada	4	–	4	–	0	5	–	6	–	0
Northern Arizona	4	–	4	–	0	7	–	4	–	0
Idaho State	3	–	5	–	0	3	–	7	–	1
Eastern Washington	2	–	6	–	0	4	–	7	–	0
Montana State	0	–	8	–	0	1	–	10	–	0
$ – Conference champion; ^ – NCAA Division I-AA playoff participant; Rankings from NCAA Division I-AA Poll

The 1987 Boise State Broncos football team represented Boise State University in the 1987 NCAA Division I-AA football season. The Broncos competed in the Big Sky Conference and played their home games on campus at Bronco Stadium in Boise, Idaho. The Broncos were led by first-year head coach Skip Hall, Boise State finished the season 6–5 overall and 4–4 in conference.

== Schedule ==
Date	Time	Opponent	Rank	Site	Result	Attendance	Source
September 5	7:00 pm	Delaware State*		Bronco Stadium; Boise, ID	W 34–13	18,101	
September 12	7:00 pm	Cal State Northridge*		Bronco Stadium; Boise, ID	W 30–0	18,534	
September 26	7:00 pm	at Weber State	No. 9	Wildcat Stadium; Ogden, UT	L 44–55	10,647	
October 3	7:00 pm	Montana State		Bronco Stadium; Boise, ID	W 35–13	19,638	
October 10	7:00 pm	Eastern Washington		Bronco Stadium; Boise, ID	W 38–13	18,672	
October 17		at Montana	No. 19	Washington–Grizzly Stadium; Missoula, MT	L 3–12	10,107	
October 24	7:00 pm	Idaho State^{†}		Bronco Stadium; Boise, ID	L 32–35	21,255	
October 31	1:30 pm	Utah*		Bronco Stadium; Boise, ID	L 27–31	15,241	
November 7	1:00 pm	at Nevada		Mackay Stadium; Reno, NV (rivalry)	W 36–31	18,150	
November 14	1:30 pm	No. 16 Northern Arizona		Bronco Stadium; Boise, ID	W 48–18	15,286	
November 21	5:30 pm	at No. 5 Idaho		Kibbie Dome; Moscow, ID (rivalry)	L 20–26	16,500	
*Non-conference game; ^{†}Homecoming; Rankings from NCAA Division I-AA Football Committee Poll released prior to the game; All times are in Mountain time
