= Ray Dorr =

American football player and coach (1941–2001)

Biographical details
- Born: November 2, 1941; Salem, Ohio, U.S.
- Died: March 1, 2001 (aged 59); College Station, Texas, U.S.
- Education: West Virginia Wesleyan

Playing career
- 1961–1964: West Virginia Wesleyan
- Position: Quarterback

Coaching career (HC unless noted)
- 1967: Akron (GA)
- 1968–1970: Akron (OB)
- 1971–1974: Kent State (QB)
- 1975–1983: Washington (QB)
- 1984–1987: Southern Illinois
- 1988: USC (WR)
- 1989–1991: USC (QB)
- 1992: USC (OC)
- 1993–1994: Kentucky (RB)
- 1995–1996: Kentucky (QB)
- 1997–1999: Texas A&M (QB)

Head coaching record
- Overall: 17–27

Raymond E. Dorr (November 2, 1941 – March 1, 2001) was an American football player and coach. He was the 15th head football coach for the Southern Illinois Salukis in Carbondale, Illinois and he held that position for four seasons, from 1984 until 1987. His overall coaching record at SIU was 17 wins, 27 losses, and 0 ties. This ranks him eighth at SIU in terms of total wins and 11th at SIU in terms of winning percentage.

Dorr died on March 1, 2001, at his home in College Station, Texas after suffering from amyotrophic lateral sclerosis.

== Head coaching record ==
Year	Team	Overall	Conference	Standing	Bowl/playoffs
Southern Illinois Salukis (Missouri Valley Conference) (1984–1985)
1984	Southern Illinois	3–8	0–5	7th	
1985	Southern Illinois	4–7	1–4	T–6th	
Southern Illinois Salukis (Gateway Football Conference) (1986–1987)
1986	Southern Illinois	7–4	4–2	T–2nd	
1987	Southern Illinois	3–8	2–4	T–5th	
Southern Illinois:		17–27	7–15		
Total:		17–27			
