= 1987 Ohio Bobcats football team =

American college football season

1987 Ohio Bobcats football
- Conference: Mid-American Conference
- Record: 1–10 (0–8 MAC)
- Head coach: Cleve Bryant (3rd season)
- Offensive coordinator: Bob Wylie (3rd season)
- Defensive coordinator: Tom Hollman (3rd season)
- Home stadium: Peden Stadium

1987 Mid-American Conference football standings
	Conf.					Overall
Team	W		L		T	W		L		T
Eastern Michigan $	7	–	1	–	0	10	–	2	–	0
Kent State	5	–	3	–	0	7	–	4	–	0
Miami (OH)	5	–	3	–	0	5	–	6	–	0
Bowling Green	5	–	3	–	0	5	–	6	–	0
Western Michigan	4	–	4	–	0	5	–	6	–	0
Central Michigan	3	–	4	–	1	5	–	5	–	1
Toledo	3	–	4	–	1	3	–	7	–	1
Ball State	3	–	5	–	0	4	–	7	–	0
Ohio	0	–	8	–	0	1	–	10	–	0
$ – Conference champion

The 1987 Ohio Bobcats football team was an American football team that represented Ohio University in the Mid-American Conference (MAC) during the 1987 NCAA Division I-A football season. In their third season under head coach Cleve Bryant, the Bobcats compiled a 1–10 record (0–8 against MAC opponents), finished in last place in the MAC, and were outscored by all opponents by a combined total of 271 to 127. They played their home games in Peden Stadium in Athens, Ohio.

== Schedule ==
Date	Opponent	Site	Result	Attendance	Source
September 5	at West Virginia*	Mountaineer Field; Morgantown, WV	L 3–23	46,744	
September 12	Marshall*	Peden Stadium; Athens, OH (rivalry)	W 23–15		
September 19	at Toledo	Glass Bowl; Toledo, OH	L 12–17		
October 3	at Kentucky*	Commonwealth Stadium; Lexington, KY	L 0–28	53,329	
October 10	Bowling Green	Peden Stadium; Athens, OH	L 7–28		
October 17	at Miami (OH)	Yager Stadium; Oxford, OH (rivalry)	L 9–10	27,382	
October 24	Kent State	Peden Stadium; Athens, OH	L 10–24	16,742	
October 31	at Eastern Michigan	Rynearson Stadium; Ypsilanti, MI	L 16–34	11,763	
November 7	Central Michigan	Peden Stadium; Athens, OH	L 17–31		
November 14	at Ball State	Ball State Stadium; Muncie, IN	L 17–30	6,240	
November 21	Western Michigan	Peden Stadium; Athens, OH	L 13–31	2,100	
*Non-conference game
