= 1987 Western Illinois Leathernecks football team =

American college football season

1987 Western Illinois Leathernecks football
- Conference: Gateway Collegiate Athletic Conference
- Record: 7–4 (5–1 GCAC)
- Head coach: Bruce Craddock (5th season)
- Offensive coordinator: Gary Crowton (1st season)
- Home stadium: Hanson Field

1987 Gateway Collegiate Athletic Conference football standings
	Conf.					Overall
Team	W		L		T	W		L		T
No. 4 Northern Iowa $^	6	–	0	–	0	10	–	4	–	0
Western Illinois	5	–	1	–	0	7	–	4	–	0
Eastern Illinois	3	–	3	–	0	5	–	6	–	0
SW Missouri State	3	–	3	–	0	5	–	6	–	0
Indiana State	2	–	4	–	0	5	–	6	–	0
Southern Illinois	2	–	4	–	0	3	–	8	–	0
Illinois State	0	–	6	–	0	3	–	7	–	0
$ – Conference champion; ^ – NCAA Division I-AA playoff participant; Rankings from NCAA Division I-AA Football Committee poll

The 1987 Western Illinois Leathernecks football team represented Western Illinois University as a member of the Gateway Collegiate Athletic Conference (GCAC) during the 1987 NCAA Division I-AA football season. Led by fifth-year head coach Bruce Craddock, the Leathernecks compiled an overall record of 7–4, with a mark of 5–1 in conference play, and finished second in the GCAC. The Leathernecks came within one loss, to Northern iowa, of winning the conference championship and making the national playoffs. The Leathernecks lost on a last second field goal to nationally ranked Division 1 Fresno State. Senior linebacker Marty Lomalino led the team in tackles and was named an All-American. Third year starter junior quarterback Paul Singer led the Leathernecks in passing for the third consecutive year, and broke the Leatherneck records for passing yards, touchdown passes, and total offense in a season.

== Schedule ==
Date	Opponent	Rank	Site	Result	Attendance	Source
September 5	Arkansas Tech*		Hanson Field; Macomb, IL	W 48–9		
September 12	at Fresno State*		Bulldog Stadium; Fresno, CA	L 17–20	34,325	
September 19	Indiana State		Hanson Field; Macomb, IL	W 42–12		
September 26	Southwest Missouri State		Hanson Field; Macomb, IL	W 20–19		
October 3	at Illinois State	No. T–17	Hancock Stadium; Normal, IL	W 31–22		
October 10	at Eastern Illinois	No. 13	O'Brien Field; Charleston, IL	W 21–12	2,413	
October 17	at Southern Illinois	No. 9	McAndrew Stadium; Carbondale, IL	W 21–15	13,325	
October 24	No. 12 Northern Iowa	No. 6	Hanson Field; Macomb, IL	L 7–52	14,291	
October 31	Liberty*	No. 16	Hanson Field; Macomb, IL	W 24–14	5,000	
November 7	at Northern Illinois*	No. 16	Huskie Stadium; DeKalb, IL	L 14–29	21,863	
November 14	at No. T–22 Sam Houston State*	No. 19	Bowers Stadium; Huntsville, TX	L 18–42	5,300	
*Non-conference game; Rankings from NCAA Division I-AA Football Committee Poll released prior to the game
