= List of Southern Conference football standings (1972–present) =

This is a list of yearly Southern Conference football standings.

== Southern Conference standings ==
1972 Southern Conference football standings
	Conf.					Overall
Team	W		L		T	W		L		T
East Carolina $	6	–	0	–	0	9	–	2	–	0
Richmond	5	–	1	–	0	6	–	4	–	0
William & Mary	4	–	2	–	0	5	–	6	–	0
The Citadel	4	–	3	–	0	5	–	6	–	0
Davidson	2	–	3	–	1	3	–	7	–	1
VMI	1	–	5	–	0	2	–	9	–	0
Furman	1	–	6	–	0	2	–	9	–	0
Appalachian State	0	–	3	–	1	5	–	5	–	1
$ – Conference champion

1973 Southern Conference football standings
	Conf.					Overall
Team	W		L		T	W		L		T
East Carolina $	7	–	0	–	0	9	–	2	–	0
Richmond	5	–	1	–	0	8	–	2	–	0
William & Mary	3	–	2	–	0	6	–	5	–	0
Furman	3	–	3	–	0	7	–	4	–	0
Appalachian State	2	–	2	–	0	3	–	7	–	1
VMI	2	–	4	–	0	2	–	9	–	0
Davidson	1	–	6	–	0	2	–	8	–	0
The Citadel	1	–	6	–	0	3	–	8	–	0
$ – Conference champion

1974 Southern Conference football standings
	Conf.					Overall
Team	W		L		T	W		L		T
VMI $	5	–	1	–	0	7	–	4	–	0
Appalachian State	4	–	1	–	0	6	–	5	–	0
East Carolina	3	–	3	–	0	7	–	4	–	0
Richmond	3	–	3	–	0	5	–	5	–	0
The Citadel	3	–	4	–	0	4	–	7	–	0
William & Mary	2	–	3	–	0	4	–	7	–	0
Furman	2	–	4	–	0	5	–	6	–	0
Davidson	0	–	3	–	0	2	–	7	–	0
$ – Conference champion

1975 Southern Conference football standings
	Conf.					Overall
Team	W		L		T	W		L		T
Richmond $	5	–	1	–	0	5	–	6	–	0
East Carolina	4	–	2	–	0	8	–	3	–	0
Appalachian State	3	–	2	–	0	8	–	3	–	0
The Citadel	4	–	3	–	0	6	–	5	–	0
William & Mary	2	–	3	–	0	2	–	9	–	0
Furman	2	–	4	–	0	5	–	5	–	1
VMI	2	–	4	–	0	3	–	8	–	0
Davidson	0	–	3	–	0	1	–	8	–	0
$ – Conference champion

1976 Southern Conference football standings
	Conf.					Overall
Team	W		L		T	W		L		T
East Carolina $	4	–	1	–	0	9	–	2	–	0
William & Mary	3	–	2	–	0	7	–	4	–	0
Appalachian State	2	–	2	–	1	6	–	4	–	1
Furman	2	–	2	–	1	6	–	4	–	1
VMI	2	–	3	–	0	5	–	5	–	0
The Citadel	1	–	4	–	0	6	–	5	–	0
Davidson	0	–	0	–	0	2	–	6	–	1
$ – Conference champion

1977 Southern Conference football standings
	Conf.					Overall
Team	W		L		T	W		L		T
Chattanooga +	4	–	1	–	0	9	–	1	–	1
VMI +	4	–	1	–	0	7	–	4	–	0
The Citadel	3	–	2	–	0	5	–	6	–	0
Furman	3	–	2	–	1	4	–	5	–	2
Western Carolina	2	–	2	–	1	6	–	4	–	1
Appalachian State	1	–	4	–	0	2	–	9	–	0
Marshall	0	–	5	–	0	2	–	9	–	0
Davidson	0	–	0	–	0	4	–	6	–	0
+ – Conference co-champions; VMI's games against William & Mary, East Carolina, and Richmond and Marshall's game against Louisville were designated as conference games and counted in the SoCon standings.

1978 Southern Conference football standings
	Conf.					Overall
Team	W		L		T	W		L		T
Furman +	4	–	1	–	0	8	–	3	–	0
Chattanooga +	4	–	1	–	0	7	–	3	–	1
Appalachian State	4	–	2	–	0	7	–	4	–	0
Western Carolina	4	–	2	–	0	6	–	5	–	0
The Citadel	2	–	3	–	0	5	–	6	–	0
VMI	1	–	4	–	0	3	–	8	–	0
Marshall	0	–	5	–	0	1	–	10	–	0
Davidson	0	–	0	–	0	5	–	5	–	0
East Tennessee State	0	–	0	–	0	4	–	7	–	0
+ – Conference co-champions; The conference was a hybrid of NCAA Division I-A and I-AA teams. Davidson was classified as I-AA. All the other teams were classified as I-A. Davidson and East Tennessee State were ineligible for the conference title. VMI's games against William & Mary and Richmond and Chattanooga's game against Richmond were designated as conference games and counted in the SoCon standings.

1979 Southern Conference football standings
	Conf.					Overall
Team	W		L		T	W		L		T
Chattanooga $	5	–	1	–	0	9	–	2	–	0
VMI	4	–	1	–	0	6	–	4	–	1
The Citadel	4	–	2	–	0	6	–	5	–	0
Furman	4	–	3	–	0	5	–	6	–	0
Appalachian State	3	–	4	–	0	3	–	8	–	0
East Tennessee State	2	–	3	–	0	7	–	4	–	0
Western Carolina	2	–	4	–	0	6	–	5	–	0
Marshall	0	–	6	–	0	1	–	10	–	0
Davidson	0	–	0	–	0	6	–	4	–	0
$ – Conference champion

1980 Southern Conference football standings
	Conf.					Overall
Team	W		L		T	W		L		T
Furman $	7	–	0	–	0	9	–	1	–	1
Chattanooga	5	–	2	–	0	8	–	3	–	0
Appalachian State	4	–	2	–	1	6	–	4	–	1
The Citadel	3	–	2	–	0	7	–	4	–	0
Western Carolina	2	–	4	–	1	3	–	7	–	1
VMI	1	–	4	–	1	3	–	7	–	1
East Tennessee State	1	–	4	–	0	2	–	9	–	0
Marshall	0	–	5	–	1	2	–	8	–	1
Davidson	0	–	0	–	0	5	–	5	–	0
$ – Conference champion; This conference was a hybrid of I-A and I-AA programs. Davidson was classified as I-AA. The rest of the teams were I-A.

1981 Southern Conference football standings
	Conf.					Overall
Team	W		L		T	W		L		T
Furman $	5	–	2	–	0	8	–	3	–	0
VMI	3	–	1	–	1	6	–	3	–	1
East Tennessee State	4	–	2	–	0	6	–	5	–	0
Chattanooga	3	–	2	–	1	7	–	3	–	1
The Citadel	3	–	2	–	1	7	–	3	–	1
Western Carolina	3	–	4	–	0	4	–	7	–	0
Appalachian State	1	–	5	–	1	3	–	7	–	1
Marshall	1	–	5	–	0	2	–	9	–	0
Davidson	0	–	0	–	0	4	–	6	–	0
$ – Conference champion; This conference was a hybrid of I-AA and I-A programs. Davidson was classified as I-AA. The rest of the teams were I-A.

1982 Southern Conference football standings
	Conf.					Overall
Team	W		L		T	W		L		T
No. 6 Furman $^	6	–	1	–	0	9	–	3	–	0
No. 17 Chattanooga	5	–	1	–	0	7	–	4	–	0
Western Carolina	4	–	2	–	0	6	–	5	–	0
The Citadel	3	–	4	–	0	5	–	6	–	0
Appalachian State	3	–	4	–	0	4	–	7	–	0
VMI	2	–	3	–	0	5	–	6	–	0
East Tennessee State	2	–	5	–	0	2	–	9	–	0
Marshall	1	–	6	–	0	3	–	7	–	0
Davidson	0	–	0	–	0	3	–	7	–	0
$ – Conference champion; ^ – NCAA Division I-AA playoff participant; Rankings from NCAA Division I-AA Football Committee poll

1983 Southern Conference football standings
	Conf.					Overall
Team	W		L		T	W		L		T
No. 2 Furman $^	6	–	0	–	1	10	–	2	–	1
No. 9 Western Carolina ^	5	–	0	–	1	11	–	3	–	1
Chattanooga	5	–	2	–	0	7	–	4	–	0
Appalachian State	4	–	3	–	0	6	–	5	–	0
Marshall	3	–	4	–	0	4	–	7	–	0
VMI	1	–	5	–	0	2	–	9	–	0
The Citadel	1	–	6	–	0	3	–	8	–	0
East Tennessee State	1	–	6	–	0	3	–	8	–	0
Davidson	0	–	2	–	0	2	–	8	–	0
$ – Conference champion; ^ – NCAA Division I-AA playoff participant; Rankings from NCAA Division I-AA Football Committee poll

1984 Southern Conference football standings
	Conf.					Overall
Team	W		L		T	W		L		T
No. 17 Chattanooga $^	5	–	1	–	0	6	–	5	–	0
No. 14 Western Carolina	5	–	2	–	0	8	–	3	–	0
The Citadel	4	–	2	–	0	7	–	4	–	0
No. 16 Furman	3	–	3	–	0	8	–	3	–	0
East Tennessee State	2	–	4	–	0	6	–	5	–	0
Marshall	2	–	4	–	0	6	–	5	–	0
Appalachian State	2	–	5	–	0	4	–	7	–	0
VMI	1	–	4	–	0	1	–	9	–	0
Davidson	0	–	2	–	0	2	–	8	–	0
$ – Conference champion; ^ – NCAA Division I-AA playoff participant; Rankings from NCAA Division I-AA Football Committee poll

1985 Southern Conference football standings
	Conf.					Overall
Team	W		L		T	W		L		T
No. T–2 Furman $^	6	–	0	–	0	12	–	2	–	0
No. T–12 Appalachian State	6	–	1	–	0	8	–	3	–	0
Chattanooga	5	–	2	–	0	6	–	5	–	0
Marshall	3	–	3	–	1	7	–	3	–	1
The Citadel	2	–	4	–	1	5	–	5	–	1
Western Carolina	2	–	4	–	1	4	–	6	–	1
VMI	1	–	4	–	1	3	–	7	–	1
East Tennessee State	0	–	7	–	0	0	–	10	–	1
Davidson	0	–	2	–	0	1	–	10	–	0
$ – Conference champion; ^ – NCAA Division I-AA playoff participant; Rankings from NCAA Division I-AA Football Committee poll

1986 Southern Conference football standings
	Conf.					Overall
Team	W		L		T	W		L		T
No. 6 Appalachian State $^	6	–	0	–	1	9	–	2	–	1
Western Carolina	5	–	2	–	0	6	–	5	–	0
No. 15 Furman ^	4	–	2	–	1	7	–	3	–	2
East Tennessee State	4	–	3	–	0	6	–	5	–	0
Marshall	3	–	3	–	0	6	–	4	–	1
Chattanooga	2	–	4	–	0	4	–	7	–	0
VMI	1	–	5	–	0	1	–	10	–	0
The Citadel	0	–	6	–	0	3	–	8	–	0
Davidson	0	–	4	–	0	0	–	9	–	0
$ – Conference champion; ^ – NCAA Division I-AA playoff participant; Rankings from NCAA Division I-AA Football Committee poll

1987 Southern Conference football standings
	Conf.					Overall
Team	W		L		T	W		L		T
No. 2 Appalachian State $^	7	–	0	–	0	11	–	3	–	0
No. 14 Marshall ^	4	–	2	–	0	10	–	5	–	0
Furman	4	–	3	–	0	7	–	4	–	0
Chattanooga	4	–	3	–	0	6	–	5	–	0
VMI	2	–	4	–	0	4	–	7	–	0
Western Carolina	2	–	4	–	0	4	–	7	–	0
East Tennessee State	2	–	5	–	0	5	–	6	–	0
The Citadel	1	–	5	–	0	4	–	7	–	0
$ – Conference champion; ^ – NCAA Division I-AA playoff participant; Rankings from NCAA Division I-AA Football Committee poll

1988 Southern Conference football standings
	Conf.					Overall
Team	W		L		T	W		L		T
No. 4 Furman +^	6	–	1	–	0	13	–	2	–	0
No. 6 Marshall +^	6	–	1	–	0	11	–	2	–	0
No. 14 The Citadel ^	5	–	2	–	0	8	–	4	–	0
Appalachian State	4	–	3	–	0	6	–	4	–	1
Chattanooga	3	–	3	–	0	4	–	7	–	0
VMI	1	–	5	–	0	2	–	9	–	0
East Tennessee State	1	–	6	–	0	3	–	8	–	0
Western Carolina	1	–	6	–	0	2	–	9	–	0
+ – Conference co-champions; ^ – NCAA Division I-AA playoff participant; Rankings from NCAA Division I-AA Football Committee poll

1989 Southern Conference football standings
	Conf.					Overall
Team	W		L		T	W		L		T
No. 2 Furman $^	7	–	0	–	0	12	–	2	–	0
No. 7 Appalachian State ^	5	–	2	–	0	9	–	3	–	0
Marshall	4	–	3	–	0	6	–	5	–	0
East Tennessee State	4	–	3	–	0	4	–	7	–	0
Chattanooga	2	–	4	–	1	3	–	7	–	1
Western Carolina	1	–	4	–	1	3	–	7	–	1
VMI	1	–	4	–	1	2	–	8	–	1
The Citadel	1	–	5	–	1	5	–	5	–	1
$ – Conference champion; ^ – NCAA Division I-AA playoff participant; Rankings from NCAA Division I-AA Football Committee poll

1990 Southern Conference football standings
	Conf.					Overall
Team	W		L		T	W		L		T
No. 12 Furman $^	6	–	1	–	0	9	–	4	–	0
Appalachian State	5	–	2	–	0	6	–	5	–	0
Chattanooga	4	–	2	–	0	6	–	5	–	0
No. 15 The Citadel ^	4	–	3	–	0	7	–	5	–	0
Marshall	4	–	3	–	0	6	–	5	–	0
Western Carolina	2	–	5	–	0	3	–	8	–	0
VMI	1	–	5	–	0	4	–	7	–	0
East Tennessee State	1	–	6	–	0	2	–	9	–	0
$ – Conference champion; ^ – NCAA Division I-AA playoff participant; Rankings from NCAA Division I-AA Football Committee poll

1991 Southern Conference football standings
	Conf.					Overall
Team	W		L		T	W		L		T
No. 17 Appalachian State $^	6	–	1	–	0	8	–	4	–	0
No. 8 Marshall ^	5	–	2	–	0	11	–	4	–	0
No. T–20 The Citadel	5	–	2	–	0	7	–	4	–	0
No. T–20 Furman	4	–	3	–	0	7	–	4	–	0
Chattanooga	4	–	3	–	0	7	–	4	–	0
VMI	2	–	5	–	0	4	–	7	–	0
Western Carolina	2	–	5	–	0	2	–	9	–	0
East Tennessee State	0	–	7	–	0	1	–	10	–	0
$ – Conference champion; ^ – NCAA Division I-AA playoff participant; Rankings from NCAA Division I-AA Football Committee poll

1992 Southern Conference football standings
	Conf.					Overall
Team	W		L		T	W		L		T
No. 1 The Citadel $^	6	–	1	–	0	11	–	2	–	0
No. 6 Marshall ^	5	–	2	–	0	12	–	3	–	0
No. 16 Appalachian State ^	5	–	2	–	0	7	–	5	–	0
Western Carolina	5	–	2	–	0	7	–	4	–	0
Furman	4	–	3	–	0	6	–	5	–	0
East Tennessee State	2	–	5	–	0	5	–	6	–	0
VMI	1	–	6	–	0	3	–	8	–	0
Chattanooga	0	–	7	–	0	2	–	9	–	0
$ – Conference champion; ^ – NCAA Division I-AA playoff participant; Rankings from NCAA Division I-AA Football Committee poll

1993 Southern Conference football standings
	Conf.					Overall
Team	W		L		T	W		L		T
No. 2 Georgia Southern $^	7	–	1	–	0	10	–	3	–	0
No. 9 Marshall ^	6	–	2	–	0	11	–	4	–	0
Western Carolina	5	–	3	–	0	6	–	5	–	0
Furman	4	–	4	–	0	5	–	5	–	1
The Citadel	4	–	4	–	0	7	–	5	–	0
Appalachian State	4	–	4	–	0	4	–	7	–	0
East Tennessee State	3	–	5	–	0	5	–	6	–	0
Chattanooga	2	–	6	–	0	4	–	7	–	0
VMI	1	–	7	–	0	1	–	10	–	0
$ – Conference champion; ^ – NCAA Division I-AA playoff participant; Rankings from The Sports Network poll

1994 Southern Conference football standings
	Conf.					Overall
Team	W		L		T	W		L		T
No. 2 Marshall $^	7	–	1	–	0	12	–	2	–	0
No. 17 Appalachian State ^	6	–	2	–	0	9	–	4	–	0
Georgia Southern	5	–	3	–	0	6	–	5	–	0
Western Carolina	5	–	3	–	0	6	–	5	–	0
The Citadel	4	–	4	–	0	6	–	5	–	0
East Tennessee State	4	–	4	–	0	6	–	5	–	0
Furman	2	–	6	–	0	3	–	8	–	0
Chattanooga	2	–	6	–	0	3	–	8	–	0
VMI	1	–	7	–	0	1	–	10	–	0
$ – Conference champion; ^ – NCAA Division I-AA playoff participant; Rankings from The Sports Network poll

1995 Southern Conference football standings
	Conf.					Overall
Team	W		L		T	W		L		T
No. 2 Appalachian State $^	8	–	0	–	0	12	–	1	–	0
No. 6 Marshall ^	7	–	1	–	0	12	–	3	–	0
No. 15 Georgia Southern ^	5	–	3	–	0	9	–	4	–	0
Furman	5	–	3	–	0	6	–	5	–	0
East Tennessee State	4	–	4	–	0	4	–	7	–	0
VMI	3	–	5	–	0	4	–	7	–	0
Chattanooga	2	–	6	–	0	4	–	7	–	0
Western Carolina	2	–	6	–	0	3	–	7	–	0
The Citadel	0	–	8	–	0	2	–	9	–	0
$ – Conference champion; ^ – NCAA Division I-AA playoff participant; Rankings from The Sports Network poll

1996 Southern Conference football standings
	Conf.			Overall
Team	W		L	W		L
No. 1 Marshall $^	8	–	0	15	–	0
No. T–8 East Tennessee State ^	7	–	1	10	–	3
No. 13 Furman ^	6	–	2	9	–	4
No. 25 Appalachian State	5	–	3	7	–	4
The Citadel	3	–	5	4	–	7
Georgia Southern	2	–	6	4	–	7
VMI	2	–	6	3	–	8
Chattanooga	2	–	6	3	–	8
Western Carolina	1	–	7	4	–	7
$ – Conference champion; Rankings from The Sports Network poll

1997 Southern Conference football standings
	Conf.			Overall
Team	W		L	W		L
No. 8 Georgia Southern $^	7	–	1	10	–	3
No. 15 Appalachian State	6	–	2	7	–	4
East Tennessee State	5	–	3	7	–	4
Furman	5	–	3	7	–	4
The Citadel	4	–	4	6	–	5
Chattanooga	4	–	4	7	–	4
Western Carolina	3	–	5	3	–	8
Wofford	2	–	6	3	–	7
VMI	0	–	8	0	–	11
$ – Conference champion; ^ – NCAA Division I-AA playoff participant; Rankings from The Sports Network poll

1998 Southern Conference football standings
	Conf.			Overall
Team	W		L	W		L
No. 2 Georgia Southern $^	8	–	0	14	–	1
No. 6 Appalachian State ^	6	–	2	10	–	3
Western Carolina	5	–	3	6	–	5
Chattanooga	4	–	4	5	–	6
The Citadel	4	–	4	5	–	6
East Tennessee State	3	–	5	4	–	7
Wofford	3	–	5	4	–	7
Furman	3	–	5	5	–	6
VMI	0	–	8	1	–	10
$ – Conference champion; ^ – NCAA Division I-AA playoff participant; Rankings from The Sports Network poll

1999 Southern Conference football standings
	Conf.			Overall
Team	W		L	W		L
No. 1 Georgia Southern +^	7	–	1	13	–	2
No. 9 Appalachian State +^	7	–	1	9	–	3
No. 12 Furman +^	7	–	1	9	–	3
Wofford	5	–	3	6	–	5
East Tennessee State	4	–	4	6	–	5
Chattanooga	3	–	5	5	–	6
Western Carolina	2	–	6	3	–	8
The Citadel	1	–	7	2	–	9
VMI	0	–	8	1	–	10
+ – Conference co-champions; ^ – NCAA Division I-AA playoff participant; Rankings from The Sports Network poll

2000 Southern Conference football standings
	Conf.			Overall
Team	W		L	W		L
No. 1 Georgia Southern $^	7	–	1	13	–	2
No. 4 Appalachian State ^	6	–	2	10	–	4
No. 10 Furman ^	6	–	2	9	–	3
No. 23 Wofford	5	–	3	7	–	4
East Tennessee State	4	–	4	6	–	5
Chattanooga	3	–	5	5	–	6
Western Carolina	3	–	5	4	–	7
The Citadel	1	–	7	2	–	9
VMI	1	–	7	2	–	9
$ – Conference champion; ^ – NCAA Division I-AA playoff participant; Rankings from The Sports Network poll

2001 Southern Conference football standings
	Conf.			Overall
Team	W		L	W		L
No. 2 Furman $^	7	–	1	12	–	3
No. 3 Georgia Southern $^	7	–	1	12	–	2
No. 6 Appalachian State ^	6	–	2	9	–	4
Western Carolina	5	–	3	7	–	4
East Tennessee State	4	–	4	6	–	5
Wofford	3	–	5	4	–	7
The Citadel	2	–	6	3	–	7
Chattanooga	1	–	7	3	–	8
VMI	1	–	7	1	–	10
$ – Conference champion; ^ – NCAA Division I-AA playoff participant; Rankings from The Sports Network I-AA Poll

2002 Southern Conference football standings
	Conf.			Overall
Team	W		L	W		L
No. 3 Georgia Southern $^	7	–	1	11	–	3
No. 14 Wofford	6	–	2	9	–	3
No. 10 Appalachian State ^	6	–	2	8	–	4
No. 9 Furman ^	6	–	2	8	–	4
VMI	3	–	5	6	–	6
Western Carolina	3	–	5	5	–	6
East Tennessee State	2	–	6	4	–	8
Chattanooga	2	–	6	2	–	10
The Citadel	1	–	7	3	–	9
$ – Conference champion; ^ – NCAA Division I-AA playoff participant; Rankings from The Sports Network poll

2003 Southern Conference football standings
	Conf.			Overall
Team	W		L	W		L
No. 3 Wofford $^	8	–	0	12	–	2
Appalachian State	6	–	2	7	–	4
No. 24 Georgia Southern	5	–	3	7	–	4
Furman	4	–	4	6	–	5
The Citadel	4	–	4	6	–	6
Western Carolina	3	–	5	5	–	7
Chattanooga	3	–	5	3	–	9
East Tennessee State	2	–	6	5	–	7
Elon	1	–	7	2	–	10
$ – Conference champion; ^ – NCAA Division I-AA playoff participant; Rankings from The Sports Network poll

2004 Southern Conference football standings
	Conf.			Overall
Team	W		L	W		L
No. 5 Furman +^	6	–	1	10	–	3
No. 10 Georgia Southern +^	6	–	1	9	–	3
No. 18 Wofford	4	–	3	8	–	3
Appalachian State	4	–	3	6	–	5
Western Carolina	2	–	5	4	–	7
The Citadel	2	–	5	3	–	7
Elon	2	–	5	3	–	8
Chattanooga	2	–	5	2	–	9
+ – Conference co-champions; ^ – NCAA Division I-AA playoff participant; Rankings from The Sports Network poll

2005 Southern Conference football standings
	Conf.			Overall
Team	W		L	W		L
No. 1 Appalachian State $^	6	–	1	12	–	3
No. 3 Furman ^	5	–	2	11	–	3
No. 9 Georgia Southern ^	5	–	2	8	–	4
Western Carolina	4	–	3	5	–	4
Wofford	3	–	4	6	–	5
Chattanooga	3	–	4	6	–	5
The Citadel	2	–	5	4	–	7
Elon	0	–	7	3	–	8
$ – Conference champion; ^ – NCAA Division I-AA playoff participant; Rankings from The Sports Network poll

2006 Southern Conference football standings
	Conf.			Overall
Team	W		L	W		L
No. 1 Appalachian State $^	7	–	0	14	–	1
No. 12 Furman ^	6	–	1	8	–	4
No. 23 Wofford	5	–	2	7	–	4
The Citadel	4	–	3	5	–	6
Elon	2	–	5	5	–	6
Chattanooga	2	–	5	3	–	8
Georgia Southern	2	–	5	3	–	8
Western Carolina	0	–	7	2	–	9
$ – Conference champion; ^ – FCS playoff participant; Rankings from The Sports Network poll

2007 Southern Conference football standings
	Conf.			Overall
Team	W		L	W		L
No. 1 Appalachian State +^	5	–	2	13	–	2
No. 6 Wofford +^	5	–	2	9	–	4
No. 17 Georgia Southern	4	–	3	7	–	4
No. 23 Elon	4	–	3	7	–	4
The Citadel	4	–	3	7	–	4
Furman	4	–	3	6	–	5
Chattanooga	2	–	5	2	–	9
Western Carolina	0	–	7	1	–	10
+ – Conference co-champions; ^ – FCS playoff participant; Rankings from The Sports Network poll

2008 Southern Conference football standings
	Conf.			Overall
Team	W		L	W		L
No. 5 Appalachian State $^	8	–	0	11	–	3
No. 9 Wofford ^	7	–	1	9	–	3
No. 17 Elon	6	–	2	8	–	4
Furman	4	–	4	7	–	5
Samford	4	–	4	6	–	5
Georgia Southern	4	–	4	6	–	5
The Citadel	2	–	6	4	–	8
Western Carolina	1	–	7	3	–	9
Chattanooga	0	–	8	1	–	11
$ – Conference champion; ^ – FCS playoff participant; Rankings from The Sports Network poll

2009 Southern Conference football standings
	Conf.			Overall
Team	W		L	W		L
No. 3 Appalachian State $^	8	–	0	11	–	3
No. 9 Elon ^	7	–	1	9	–	3
Furman	5	–	3	6	–	5
Chattanooga	4	–	4	6	–	5
Georgia Southern	4	–	4	5	–	6
Samford	3	–	5	5	–	6
Wofford	2	–	6	3	–	8
The Citadel	2	–	6	4	–	7
Western Carolina	1	–	7	2	–	9
$ – Conference champion; ^ – FCS playoff participant; Rankings from The Sports Network poll

2010 Southern Conference football standings
	Conf.			Overall
Team	W		L	W		L
No. 4 Appalachian State +^	7	–	1	10	–	3
No. 6 Wofford +^	7	–	1	10	–	3
No. 5 Georgia Southern ^	5	–	3	10	–	5
Chattanooga	5	–	3	6	–	5
Elon	5	–	3	6	–	5
Furman	3	–	5	5	–	6
Samford	2	–	6	4	–	7
The Citadel	1	–	7	3	–	8
Western Carolina	1	–	7	2	–	9
+ – Conference co-champions; ^ – FCS playoff participant; Rankings from The Sports Network poll

2011 Southern Conference football standings
	Conf.			Overall
Team	W		L	W		L
No. 3 Georgia Southern $^	7	–	1	11	–	3
No. 12 Wofford ^	6	–	2	8	–	4
No. 9 Appalachian State ^	6	–	2	8	–	4
Furman	5	–	3	6	–	5
Samford	4	–	4	6	–	5
Chattanooga	3	–	5	5	–	6
Elon	3	–	5	5	–	6
The Citadel	2	–	6	4	–	7
Western Carolina	0	–	8	1	–	10
$ – Conference champion; ^ – FCS playoff participant; Rankings from The Sports Network poll

2012 Southern Conference football standings
	Conf.			Overall
Team	W		L	W		L
No. 6 Georgia Southern +^	6	–	2	10	–	4
No. 9 Wofford +^	6	–	2	9	–	4
No. 7 Appalachian State +^	6	–	2	8	–	4
The Citadel	5	–	3	7	–	4
Samford	5	–	3	7	–	4
Chattanooga	5	–	3	6	–	5
Furman	2	–	6	3	–	8
Elon	1	–	7	3	–	8
Western Carolina	0	–	8	1	–	10
+ – Conference co-champions; ^ – FCS playoff participant; Rankings from The Sports Network poll

2013 Southern Conference football standings
	Conf.			Overall
Team	W		L	W		L
No. 22 Furman +^	6	–	2	8	–	6
No. 19 Samford +^	6	–	2	8	–	5
No. 23 Chattanooga +	6	–	2	8	–	4
Georgia Southern *	4	–	4	7	–	4
Wofford	4	–	4	5	–	6
The Citadel	4	–	4	5	–	7
Appalachian State *	4	–	4	4	–	8
Elon	1	–	7	2	–	10
Western Carolina	1	–	7	2	–	10
+ – Conference co-champions; ^ – FCS playoff participant; * – Appalachian State and Georgia Southern ineligible for conference championship and FCS playoffs as part of FBS transition; Rankings from The Sports Network poll

2014 Southern Conference football standings
	Conf.			Overall
Team	W		L	W		L
No. 8 Chattanooga $^	7	–	0	10	–	4
Samford	5	–	2	7	–	4
Western Carolina	5	–	2	7	–	5
Wofford	4	–	3	6	–	5
The Citadel	3	–	4	5	–	7
Furman	2	–	5	3	–	9
Mercer	1	–	6	6	–	6
VMI	1	–	6	2	–	10
$ – Conference champion; ^ – FCS playoff participant; Rankings from The Sports Network poll

2015 Southern Conference football standings
	Conf.			Overall
Team	W		L	W		L
No. 9 Chattanooga +^	6	–	1	9	–	4
No. 13 The Citadel +^	6	–	1	9	–	4
Western Carolina	5	–	2	7	–	4
Samford	3	–	4	6	–	5
Wofford	3	–	4	5	–	6
Mercer	2	–	5	5	–	6
Furman	2	–	5	4	–	7
VMI	1	–	6	2	–	9
+ – Conference co-champions; ^ – FCS playoff participant; Rankings from STATS Poll

2016 Southern Conference football standings
	Conf.			Overall
Team	W		L	W		L
No. 10 The Citadel $^	8	–	0	10	–	2
No. 9 Wofford ^	6	–	2	10	–	4
No. 13 Chattanooga ^	6	–	2	9	–	4
No. 23 Samford ^	5	–	3	7	–	5
Mercer	4	–	4	6	–	5
Furman	3	–	5	3	–	8
East Tennessee State	2	–	6	5	–	6
Western Carolina	1	–	7	2	–	9
VMI	1	–	7	3	–	8
$ – Conference champion; ^ – FCS playoff participant; Rankings from STATS Poll

2017 Southern Conference football standings
	Conf.			Overall
Team	W		L	W		L
No. 6 Wofford $^	7	–	1	10	–	3
No. 18 Samford ^	6	–	2	8	–	4
No. 19 Furman ^	6	–	2	8	–	5
Western Carolina	5	–	3	7	–	5
Mercer	4	–	4	5	–	6
The Citadel	3	–	5	5	–	6
Chattanooga	3	–	5	3	–	8
East Tennessee State	2	–	6	4	–	7
VMI	0	–	8	0	–	11
$ – Conference champion; ^ – FCS playoff participant; Rankings from STATS Poll

2018 Southern Conference football standings
	Conf.			Overall
Team	W		L	W		L
No. 13 Wofford +^	6	–	2	9	–	4
No. 22 East Tennessee State +^	6	–	2	8	–	4
Furman +	6	–	2	6	–	4
Samford	5	–	3	6	–	5
Chattanooga	4	–	4	6	–	5
The Citadel	4	–	4	5	–	6
Mercer	4	–	4	5	–	6
Western Carolina	1	–	7	3	–	8
VMI	0	–	8	1	–	10
+ – Conference co-champions; ^ – FCS playoff participant; Rankings from STATS Poll

2019 Southern Conference football standings
	Conf.			Overall
Team	W		L	W		L
No. 16 Wofford $^	7	–	1	8	–	3
No. 21 Furman ^	6	–	2	8	–	4
Chattanooga	5	–	3	6	–	6
The Citadel	4	–	4	6	–	6
Samford	4	–	4	5	–	7
VMI	4	–	4	5	–	7
Mercer	3	–	5	4	–	8
Western Carolina	2	–	6	3	–	9
East Tennessee State	1	–	7	3	–	9
$ – Conference champion; ^ – FCS playoff participant; Rankings from STATS Poll

2020 Southern Conference football standings
	Conf.			Overall
Team	W		L	W		L
No. 11 VMI $^	6	–	1	6	–	2
No. 22 East Tennessee State	4	–	2	4	–	2
Chattanooga†	3	–	1	3	–	2
Mercer	5	–	3	5	–	6
Samford	4	–	3	4	–	3
Furman	3	–	4	3	–	4
Wofford†	1	–	4	1	–	4
The Citadel	2	–	6	2	–	10
Western Carolina	1	–	5	1	–	8
$ – Conference champion; ^ – FCS playoff participant; † – Chattanooga and Wofford opted out of the remainder of the spring season on March 29 and April 5, 2021, respectively.; Rankings from STATS Poll

2021 Southern Conference football standings
	Conf.			Overall
Team	W		L	W		L
No. 9 East Tennessee State $^	7	–	1	11	–	2
Mercer	6	–	2	7	–	3
Chattanooga	5	–	3	6	–	5
Western Carolina	4	–	4	4	–	7
Furman	4	–	4	6	–	5
VMI	4	–	4	6	–	5
Samford	3	–	5	4	–	7
The Citadel	3	–	5	4	–	7
Wofford	0	–	8	1	–	10
$ – Conference champion; ^ – FCS playoff participant; Rankings from STATS Poll

2022 Southern Conference football standings
	Conf.			Overall
Team	W		L	W		L
No. 7 Samford $^	8	–	0	11	–	2
No. 10 Furman ^	7	–	1	10	–	3
No. 23 Chattanooga	5	–	3	7	–	4
No. 24 Mercer	5	–	3	7	–	4
Western Carolina	4	–	4	6	–	5
Wofford	3	–	5	3	–	8
The Citadel	3	–	5	4	–	7
East Tennessee State	1	–	7	3	–	8
VMI	0	–	8	1	–	10
$ – Conference champion; ^ – FCS playoff participant; Rankings from STATS Poll

2023 Southern Conference football standings
	Conf.			Overall
Team	W		L	W		L
No. 7 Furman $^	7	–	1	10	–	3
No. 14 Chattanooga ^	6	–	2	8	–	5
No. 17 Mercer ^	6	–	2	9	–	4
No. 23 Western Carolina	5	–	3	7	–	4
Samford	4	–	4	6	–	5
VMI	4	–	4	5	–	6
East Tennessee State	2	–	6	3	–	8
Wofford	2	–	6	2	–	9
The Citadel	0	–	8	0	–	11
$ – Conference champion; ^ – FCS playoff participant; Rankings from STATS Poll

2024 Southern Conference football standings
	Conf.			Overall
Team	W		L	W		L
No. 8 Mercer $^	7	–	1	11	–	3
Western Carolina	6	–	2	7	–	5
Chattanooga	5	–	3	7	–	5
East Tennessee State	5	–	3	7	–	5
Samford	3	–	4	4	–	7
The Citadel	3	–	5	5	–	7
Wofford	3	–	5	5	–	7
Furman	2	–	5	3	–	8
VMI	1	–	7	1	–	11
$ – Conference champion; ^ – FCS playoff participant; Rankings from STATS Poll

2025 Southern Conference football standings
	Conf.			Overall
Team	W		L	W		L
No. 17 Mercer $^	8	–	0	9	–	3
Western Carolina	6	–	2	7	–	5
East Tennessee State	5	–	3	7	–	5
Wofford	5	–	3	6	–	6
Chattanooga	4	–	4	5	–	7
Furman	4	–	4	6	–	6
The Citadel	3	–	5	4	–	8
Samford	1	–	7	1	–	11
VMI	0	–	8	1	–	11
$ – Conference champion; ^ – FCS playoff participant; Rankings from STATS Poll

2026 Southern Conference football standings
	Conf.			Overall
Team	W		L	W		L
Chattanooga	0	–	0	0	–	0
East Tennessee State	0	–	0	0	–	0
Furman	0	–	0	0	–	0
Mercer	0	–	0	0	–	0
Samford	0	–	0	0	–	0
Tennessee Tech	0	–	0	0	–	0
The Citadel	0	–	0	0	–	0
VMI	0	–	0	0	–	0
Western Carolina	0	–	0	0	–	0
Wofford	0	–	0	0	–	0
Rankings from STATS Poll
