= 1991 Marshall Thundering Herd football team =

American college football season

1991 Marshall Thundering Herd football

NCAA Division I-AA Championship Game, L 17–25 vs. Youngstown State
- Conference: Southern Conference
- Record: 11–4 (5–2 SoCon)
- Head coach: Jim Donnan (2nd season)
- Offensive coordinator: Greg Briner (1st season)
- Defensive coordinator: Mickey Matthews (2nd season)
- Captains: Derek Grier; Madison Sayre; Ricardo Clark; Matt Downey
- Home stadium: Marshall University Stadium

1991 Southern Conference football standings
	Conf.					Overall
Team	W		L		T	W		L		T
No. 17 Appalachian State $^	6	–	1	–	0	8	–	4	–	0
No. 8 Marshall ^	5	–	2	–	0	11	–	4	–	0
No. T–20 The Citadel	5	–	2	–	0	7	–	4	–	0
No. T–20 Furman	4	–	3	–	0	7	–	4	–	0
Chattanooga	4	–	3	–	0	7	–	4	–	0
VMI	2	–	5	–	0	4	–	7	–	0
Western Carolina	2	–	5	–	0	2	–	9	–	0
East Tennessee State	0	–	7	–	0	1	–	10	–	0
$ – Conference champion; ^ – NCAA Division I-AA playoff participant; Rankings from NCAA Division I-AA Football Committee poll

The 1991 Marshall Thundering Herd football team represented Marshall University as a member of the Southern Conference (SoCon) during the 1991 NCAA Division I-AA football season. Led by second-year head coach Jim Donnan, the Thundering Herd compiled an overall record of 11–4 with a mark of 5–2 in conference play, tying for second place in the SoCon. Marshall advanced to the NCAA Division I-AA Championship playoffs, where they beat Western Illinois in the first round, Northern Iowa in the quarterfinals, and Eastern Kentucky in the semifinals before losing to Youngstown State in the NCAA Division I-AA Championship Game.

Marshall played home games in the newly-opened Marshall University Stadium in Huntington, West Virginia.

== Schedule ==
Date	Opponent	Rank	Site	TV	Result	Attendance	Source
August 31	at Appalachian State	No. 14	Kidd Brewer Stadium; Boone, NC (rivalry)		L 3–9	17,671	
September 7	No. 8 New Hampshire*	No. 14	Marshall University Stadium; Huntington, WV		W 24–23	33,116	
September 14	Morehead State*		Marshall University Stadium; Huntington, WV		W 70–11	24,127	
September 28	Brown*	No. 20	Marshall University Stadium; Huntington, WV		W 46–0	22,223	
October 12	at No. 2 Furman	No. 13	Paladin Stadium; Greenville, SC		W 38–35	16,125	
October 19	at No. 11 (I-A) NC State*	No. 8	Carter–Finley Stadium; Raleigh, NC		L 14–15	41,019	
October 26	at Chattanooga	No. 6	Chamberlain Field; Chattanooga, TN		L 31–38	8,026	
November 2	Western Carolina^{†}	No. 19	Marshall University Stadium; Huntington, WV		W 27–24 ^{3OT}	20,466	
November 9	No. 18 The Citadel	No. 15	Marshall University Stadium; Huntington, WV		W 37–31	18,003	
November 16	VMI	No. 10	Marshall University Stadium; Huntington, WV		W 61–0	17,535	
November 23	East Tennessee State	No. 8	Marshall University Stadium; Huntington, WV		W 63–9	18,256	
November 30	No. 14 Western Illinois*	No. 8	Marshall University Stadium; Huntington, WV (NCAA Division I-AA First Round)		W 20–17	16,840	
December 7	No. 4 Northern Iowa*	No. 8	Marshall University Stadium; Huntington, WV (NCAA Division I-AA Quarterfinal)		W 41–13	16,889	
December 14	No. 2 Eastern Kentucky*	No. 8	Marshall University Stadium; Huntington, WV (NCAA Division I-AA Semifinal)		W 14–7	21,084	
December 21	vs. No. 13 Youngstown State*	No. 8	Paulson Stadium; Statesboro, GA (NCAA Division I-AA Championship Game)	CBS	L 17–25	12,667	
*Non-conference game; ^{†}Homecoming; Rankings from NCAA Division I-AA Football Committee Poll released prior to the game
