= 1987 Chattanooga Moccasins football team =

American college football season

1987 Chattanooga Moccasins football
- Conference: Southern Conference
- Record: 6–5 (4–3 SoCon)
- Head coach: Buddy Nix (4th season)
- Offensive coordinator: Joe D'Alessandris (2nd season)
- Captains: Steve Colwell; Zach Ervin
- Home stadium: Chamberlain Field

1987 Southern Conference football standings
	Conf.					Overall
Team	W		L		T	W		L		T
No. 2 Appalachian State $^	7	–	0	–	0	11	–	3	–	0
No. 14 Marshall ^	4	–	2	–	0	10	–	5	–	0
Furman	4	–	3	–	0	7	–	4	–	0
Chattanooga	4	–	3	–	0	6	–	5	–	0
VMI	2	–	4	–	0	4	–	7	–	0
Western Carolina	2	–	4	–	0	4	–	7	–	0
East Tennessee State	2	–	5	–	0	5	–	6	–	0
The Citadel	1	–	5	–	0	4	–	7	–	0
$ – Conference champion; ^ – NCAA Division I-AA playoff participant; Rankings from NCAA Division I-AA Football Committee poll

The 1987 Chattanooga Moccasins football team represented the University of Tennessee at Chattanooga as a member of the Southern Conference (SoCon) in the 1987 NCAA Division I-AA football season. The Moccasins were led by fourth-year head coach Buddy Nix and played their home games at Chamberlain Field. They finished the season 6–5 overall and 4–3 in SoCon play to tied for third place.

== Schedule ==
Date	Opponent	Rank	Site	Result	Attendance	Source
September 12	No. 3 Eastern Kentucky*		Chamberlain Field; Chattanooga, TN	W 10–0	8,585	
September 19	at No. T–14 East Tennessee State	No. 11	Memorial Center; Johnson City, TN	L 14–34	11,021	
September 26	at Furman		Paladin Stadium; Greenville, SC	W 16–14	9,377	
October 3	Louisiana Tech*	No. 19	Chamberlain Field; Chattanooga, TN	W 20–18	8,450	
October 10	Western Kentucky*	No. 12	Chamberlain Field; Chattanooga, TN	L 17–20	8,377	
October 17	The Citadel^{†}		Chamberlain Field; Chattanooga, TN	W 22–19	8,973	
October 24	at No. 2 Appalachian State	No. T–17	Conrad Stadium; Boone, NC	L 3–17	23,727	
October 31	Marshall		Chamberlain Field; Chattanooga, TN	L 26–28	6,107	
November 7	at Western Carolina		Whitmire Stadium; Cullowhee, NC	W 13–11	5,216	
November 14	Tennessee Tech*		Chamberlain Field; Chattanooga, TN	L 13–20	7,573	
November 21	at VMI		Alumni Memorial Field; Lexington, VA	W 31–0	3,500	
*Non-conference game; ^{†}Homecoming; Rankings from NCAA Division I-AA Football Committee Poll released prior to the game
