= 1991 Furman Paladins football team =

American college football season

1991 Furman Paladins football
- Conference: Southern Conference
- Record: 7–4 (4–3 SoCon)
- Head coach: Jimmy Satterfield (6th season)
- Captains: Eric Walter; Allen Edwards; Venton Bell; Taylor Quarles
- Home stadium: Paladin Stadium

1991 Southern Conference football standings
	Conf.					Overall
Team	W		L		T	W		L		T
No. 17 Appalachian State $^	6	–	1	–	0	8	–	4	–	0
No. 8 Marshall ^	5	–	2	–	0	11	–	4	–	0
No. T–20 The Citadel	5	–	2	–	0	7	–	4	–	0
No. T–20 Furman	4	–	3	–	0	7	–	4	–	0
Chattanooga	4	–	3	–	0	7	–	4	–	0
VMI	2	–	5	–	0	4	–	7	–	0
Western Carolina	2	–	5	–	0	2	–	9	–	0
East Tennessee State	0	–	7	–	0	1	–	10	–	0
$ – Conference champion; ^ – NCAA Division I-AA playoff participant; Rankings from NCAA Division I-AA Football Committee poll

The 1991 Furman Paladins football team was an American football team that represented Furman University as a member of the Southern Conference (SoCon) during the 1991 NCAA Division I-AA football season. In their sixth year under head coach Jimmy Satterfield, the Paladins compiled an overall record of 7–4 with a mark of 4–3 in conference play, finishing fourth in the SoCon.

== Schedule ==
Date	Opponent	Rank	Site	Result	Attendance	Source
September 7	at Connecticut*	No. 6	Memorial Stadium; Storrs, CT	W 35–24	9,108	
September 14	Liberty*	No. 6	Paladin Stadium; Greenville, SC	W 31–7	14,014	
September 21	Presbyterian*	No. 3	Paladin Stadium; Greenville, SC	W 52–7	12,511	
September 28	at Western Carolina	No. 3	Whitmire Stadium; Cullowhee, NC	W 42–14	12,445	
October 5	at VMI	No. 2	Alumni Memorial Field; Lexington, VA	W 46–28	8,223	
October 12	No. 13 Marshall	No. 2	Paladin Stadium; Greenville, SC	L 35–38	16,125	
October 19	No. 16 Appalachian State	No. 9	Paladin Stadium; Greenville, SC	L 23–26 ^{3OT}	13,082	
November 2	East Tennessee State	No. 13	Paladin Stadium; Greenville, SC	W 52–23	12,922	
November 9	at Georgia Tech*	No. 11	Bobby Dodd Stadium; Atlanta, GA	L 17–19	40,039	
November 16	Chattanooga	No. 12	Paladin Stadium; Greenville, SC	W 24–21	16,579	
November 23	at The Citadel	No. 10	Johnson Hagood Stadium; Charleston, SC (rivalry)	L 6–10	21,623	
*Non-conference game; Rankings from NCAA Division I-AA Football Committee Poll released prior to the game
