= 1991 Appalachian State Mountaineers football team =

American college football season

1991 Appalachian State Mountaineers football

SoCon champion

NCAA Division I-AA First Round, L 3–14 vs. Eastern Kentucky
- Conference: Southern Conference
- Record: 8–4 (5–1 SoCon)
- Head coach: Jerry Moore (3rd season)
- Home stadium: Kidd Brewer Stadium

1991 Southern Conference football standings
	Conf.					Overall
Team	W		L		T	W		L		T
No. 17 Appalachian State $^	6	–	1	–	0	8	–	4	–	0
No. 8 Marshall ^	5	–	2	–	0	11	–	4	–	0
No. T–20 The Citadel	5	–	2	–	0	7	–	4	–	0
No. T–20 Furman	4	–	3	–	0	7	–	4	–	0
Chattanooga	4	–	3	–	0	7	–	4	–	0
VMI	2	–	5	–	0	4	–	7	–	0
Western Carolina	2	–	5	–	0	2	–	9	–	0
East Tennessee State	0	–	7	–	0	1	–	10	–	0
$ – Conference champion; ^ – NCAA Division I-AA playoff participant; Rankings from NCAA Division I-AA Football Committee poll

The 1991 Appalachian State Mountaineers football team was an American football team that represented Appalachian State University as a member of the Southern Conference (SoCon) during the 1991 NCAA Division I-AA football season. In their third year under head coach Jerry Moore, the Mountaineers compiled an overall record of 8–4 with a conference mark of 5–1. Appalachian State was SoCon champion and advanced to the NCAA Division I-AA Football Championship playoffs, where they lost to Eastern Kentucky in the first round.

== Schedule ==
Date	Opponent	Rank	Site	Result	Attendance	Source
August 31	No. 14 Marshall		Kidd Brewer Stadium; Boone, NC (rivalry)	W 9–3	17,671	
September 7	at No. 8 (I-A) Clemson*		Memorial Stadium; Clemson, SC	L 0–34	74,127	
September 14	VMI		Kidd Brewer Stadium; Boone, NC	W 24–19	10,731	
September 21	James Madison*	No. 19	Kidd Brewer Stadium; Boone, NC	L 8–31	13,467	
September 28	No. 10 Chattanooga		Kidd Brewer Stadium; Boone, NC	W 42–7	18,711	
October 5	at Wake Forest*		Groves Stadium; Winston-Salem, NC	W 17–3	28,234	
October 12	at East Tennessee State	No. 17	Memorial Center; Johnson City, TN	W 21–14	5,416	
October 19	at No. 9 Furman	No. 16	Paladin Stadium; Greenville, SC	W 26–23 ^{3OT}	13,082	
November 2	at The Citadel	No. 10	Johnson Hagood Stadium; Charleston, SC	L 10–17	20,071	
November 9	Mississippi College*	No. 20	Kidd Brewer Stadium; Boone, NC	W 31–23	17,231	
November 16	at Western Carolina	No. 18	Whitmire Stadium; Cullowhee, NC (rivalry)	W 24–14	11,633	
November 30	at No. 2 Eastern Kentucky*	No. 17	Roy Kidd Stadium; Richmond, KY (NCAA Division I-AA First Round)	L 3–14	2,750	
*Non-conference game; Rankings from NCAA Division I-AA Football Committee Poll released prior to the game

== After the season ==
=== NFL draft ===
The following Mountaineers were selected in the 1992 NFL draft following the season.

Round	Pick	Player	Position	NFL team
5	122	Gary Dandridge	Defensive back	Seattle Seahawks
7	178	Mike Frier	Defensive tackle	Seattle Seahawks
