= 1988 Appalachian State Mountaineers football team =

American college football season

1988 Appalachian State Mountaineers football
- Conference: Southern Conference
- Record: 6–4–1 (4–3 SoCon)
- Head coach: Sparky Woods (5th season)
- Home stadium: Conrad Stadium

1988 Southern Conference football standings
	Conf.					Overall
Team	W		L		T	W		L		T
No. 4 Furman +^	6	–	1	–	0	13	–	2	–	0
No. 6 Marshall +^	6	–	1	–	0	11	–	2	–	0
No. 14 The Citadel ^	5	–	2	–	0	8	–	4	–	0
Appalachian State	4	–	3	–	0	6	–	4	–	1
Chattanooga	3	–	3	–	0	4	–	7	–	0
VMI	1	–	5	–	0	2	–	9	–	0
East Tennessee State	1	–	6	–	0	3	–	8	–	0
Western Carolina	1	–	6	–	0	2	–	9	–	0
+ – Conference co-champions; ^ – NCAA Division I-AA playoff participant; Rankings from NCAA Division I-AA Football Committee poll

The 1988 Appalachian State Mountaineers football team was an American football team that represented Appalachian State University as a member of the Southern Conference (SoCon)during the 1988 NCAA Division I-AA football season. In their fifth year under head coach Sparky Woods, the Mountaineers compiled an overall record of 6–4–1 with a mark of 4–3 in conference play, placing fourth in the SoCon.

== Schedule ==
Date	Opponent	Rank	Site	Result	Attendance	Source
September 3	The Citadel	No. 3	Conrad Stadium; Boone, NC	W 38–14	13,428	
September 10	at No. 16 James Madison*	No. 3	JMU Stadium; Harrisonburg, VA	W 17–14	9,250	
September 24	Gardner–Webb*	No. 2	Conrad Stadium; Boone, NC	W 39–10	18,262	
October 1	at No. 8 (I-A) South Carolina*	No. 2	Williams–Brice Stadium; Columbia, SC	L 9–35	71,380	
October 8	at VMI	No. 3	Alumni Memorial Field; Lexington, VA	W 34–20	4,700	
October 15	No. 20 Furman	No. 3	Conrad Stadium; Boone, NC	L 9–24	25,301	
October 22	East Tennessee State	No. 13	Conrad Stadium; Boone, NC	W 51–3	8,106	
October 29	at No. 2 Marshall	No. 11	Fairfield Stadium; Huntington, WV (rivalry)	L 27–30	16,447	
November 5	Western Carolina	No. 16	Conrad Stadium; Boone, NC (rivalry)	W 42–21	12,375	
November 12	at Chattanooga	No. 16	Chamberlain Field; Chattanooga, TN	L 24–28	4,212	
November 19	at Wake Forest*		Groves Stadium; Winston-Salem, NC	T 34–34	21,050	
*Non-conference game; Rankings from NCAA Division I-AA Football Committee Poll released prior to the game
