= 1987 East Tennessee State Buccaneers football team =

American college football season

1987 East Tennessee State Buccaneers football
- Conference: Southern Conference
- Record: 5–6 (2–5 SoCon)
- Head coach: Mike Ayers (3rd season)
- Home stadium: Memorial Center

1987 Southern Conference football standings
	Conf.					Overall
Team	W		L		T	W		L		T
No. 2 Appalachian State $^	7	–	0	–	0	11	–	3	–	0
No. 14 Marshall ^	4	–	2	–	0	10	–	5	–	0
Furman	4	–	3	–	0	7	–	4	–	0
Chattanooga	4	–	3	–	0	6	–	5	–	0
VMI	2	–	4	–	0	4	–	7	–	0
Western Carolina	2	–	4	–	0	4	–	7	–	0
East Tennessee State	2	–	5	–	0	5	–	6	–	0
The Citadel	1	–	5	–	0	4	–	7	–	0
$ – Conference champion; ^ – NCAA Division I-AA playoff participant; Rankings from NCAA Division I-AA Football Committee poll

The 1987 East Tennessee State Buccaneers football team was an American football team that represented East Tennessee State University as a member of the Southern Conference (SoCon) during the 1987 NCAA Division I-AA football season. Led by third-year head coach Mike Ayers, the Buccaneers compiled and overall record of 5–6, with a mark of 2–5 in conference play, and finished seventh in the SoCon.

== Schedule ==
Date	Opponent	Rank	Site	Result	Attendance	Source
September 5	No. 17 William & Mary*		Memorial Center; Johnson City, TN	W 49–25	7,615	
September 12	at Wofford*		Synder Field; Spartanburg, SC	W 10–6	3,567	
September 19	No. 11 Chattanooga	No. T–14	Memorial Center; Johnson City, TN	W 34–14	11,021	
September 26	Western Carolina	No. 8	Memorial Center; Johnson City, TN	L 20–37	9,475	
October 10	at Furman	No. 16	Paladin Stadium; Greenville, SC	L 13–24	9,000	
October 17	at Marshall		Fairfield Stadium; Huntington, WV	L 7–27	15,316	
October 24	The Citadel		Memorial Center; Johnson City, TN	W 24–21	9,682	
October 31	No. 2 Appalachian State		Memorial Center; Johnson City, TN	L 9–28	5,767	
November 7	at NC State*		Carter–Finley Stadium; Raleigh, NC	W 29–14	35,400	
November 14	at VMI		Alumni Memorial Field; Lexington, VA	L 13–20		
November 21	No. 9 James Madison*		Memorial Center; Johnson City, TN	L 24–28		
*Non-conference game; Rankings from NCAA Division I-AA Football Committee Poll released prior to the game
