= 1987 Appalachian State Mountaineers football team =

American college football season

1987 Appalachian State Mountaineers football

SoCon champion

NCAA Division I-AA Semifinal, L 10–24 vs. Marshall
- Conference: Southern Conference
- Record: 11–3 (7–0 SoCon)
- Head coach: Sparky Woods (4th season)
- Home stadium: Conrad Stadium

1987 Southern Conference football standings
	Conf.					Overall
Team	W		L		T	W		L		T
No. 2 Appalachian State $^	7	–	0	–	0	11	–	3	–	0
No. 14 Marshall ^	4	–	2	–	0	10	–	5	–	0
Furman	4	–	3	–	0	7	–	4	–	0
Chattanooga	4	–	3	–	0	6	–	5	–	0
VMI	2	–	4	–	0	4	–	7	–	0
Western Carolina	2	–	4	–	0	4	–	7	–	0
East Tennessee State	2	–	5	–	0	5	–	6	–	0
The Citadel	1	–	5	–	0	4	–	7	–	0
$ – Conference champion; ^ – NCAA Division I-AA playoff participant; Rankings from NCAA Division I-AA Football Committee poll

The 1987 Appalachian State Mountaineers football team was an American football team that represented Appalachian State University as a member of the Southern Conference (SoCon) during the 1987 NCAA Division I-AA football season. In their fourth year under head coach Sparky Woods, the Mountaineers compiled an overall record of 11–3 with a conference mark of 7–0, winning the SoCon title. Appalachian State advanced to the NCAA Division I-AA Football Championship playoffs, where they beat Richmond in the first round and Georgia Southern in the quarterfinals before falling to Marshall in the semifinals.

== Schedule ==
Date	Opponent	Rank	Site	Result	Attendance	Source
September 5	at South Carolina*		Williams–Brice Stadium; Columbia, SC	L 3–24	68,830	
September 12	James Madison*		Conrad Stadium; Boone, NC	W 17–10	12,862	
September 19	VMI	No. 7	Conrad Stadium; Boone, NC	W 27–10	13,911	
September 26	at Wake Forest*	No. 4	Groves Stadium; Winston-Salem, NC	L 12–16	33,400	
October 10	Liberty*	No. 4	Conrad Stadium; Boone, NC	W 24–6	13,715	
October 17	at Furman	No. 3	Paladin Stadium; Greenville, SC	W 16–8	13,147	
October 24	No. T–17 Chattanooga	No. 2	Conrad Stadium; Boone, NC	W 17–3	23,727	
October 31	at East Tennessee State	No. 2	Memorial Center; Johnson City, TN	W 28–9	5,767	
November 7	No. 18 Marshall	No. 2	Conrad Stadium; Boone, NC (rivalry)	W 17–10	14,306	
November 14	at The Citadel	No. 2	Johnson Hagood Stadium; Charleston, SC	W 27–17	17,349	
November 21	at Western Carolina	No. 2	Whitmire Stadium; Cullowhee, NC (rivalry)	W 33–13	11,154	
November 28	No. 17 Richmond*	No. 2	Conrad Stadium; Boone, NC (NCAA Division I-AA First Round)	W 20–3	4,138	
December 5	No. 6 Georgia Southern*	No. 2	Conrad Stadium; Boone, NC (NCAA Division I-AA Quarterfinal)	W 19–0	9,229	
December 12	No. 14 Marshall	No. 2	Conrad Stadium; Boone, NC (NCAA Division I-AA Semifinal)	L 10–24	14,621	
*Non-conference game; Rankings from NCAA Division I-AA Football Committee Poll released prior to the game
