= 1988 VMI Keydets football team =

American college football season

1988 VMI Keydets football
- Conference: Southern Conference
- Record: 2–9 (1–5 SoCon)
- Head coach: Eddie Williamson (4th season)
- Home stadium: Alumni Memorial Field

1988 Southern Conference football standings
	Conf.					Overall
Team	W		L		T	W		L		T
No. 4 Furman +^	6	–	1	–	0	13	–	2	–	0
No. 6 Marshall +^	6	–	1	–	0	11	–	2	–	0
No. 14 The Citadel ^	5	–	2	–	0	8	–	4	–	0
Appalachian State	4	–	3	–	0	6	–	4	–	1
Chattanooga	3	–	3	–	0	4	–	7	–	0
VMI	1	–	5	–	0	2	–	9	–	0
East Tennessee State	1	–	6	–	0	3	–	8	–	0
Western Carolina	1	–	6	–	0	2	–	9	–	0
+ – Conference co-champions; ^ – NCAA Division I-AA playoff participant; Rankings from NCAA Division I-AA Football Committee poll

The 1988 VMI Keydets football team was an American football team that represented the Virginia Military Institute (VMI) as a member of the Southern Conference (SoCon) during the 1988 NCAA Division I-AA football season. In their fourth year under head coach Eddie Williamson, the team compiled an overall record of 2–9, with a mark of 1–5 in conference play, placing sixth in the SoCon. Williamson resigned in December, and compiled an all-time record of 10–33–1 during his tenure of head coach of the Keydets from 1985 through 1988.

== Schedule ==
Date	Opponent	Site	Result	Attendance	Source
September 3	at East Tennessee State	Memorial Center; Johnson City, TN	L 10–26	5,750	
September 10	at William & Mary*	Cary Field; Williamsburg, VA (rivalry)	L 7–30	9,106	
September 17	Richmond*	Alumni Memorial Field; Lexington, VA (rivalry)	L 13–14	6,060	
September 24	No. 3 Marshall	Alumni Memorial Field; Lexington, VA	L 20–24	6,750	
October 1	at No. 15 Furman	Paladin Stadium; Greenville, SC	L 13–31	11,243	
October 8	No. 3 Appalachian State	Alumni Memorial Field; Lexington, VA	L 20–34	4,700	
October 22	at James Madison*	JMU Stadium; Harrisonburg, VA	L 0–37	15,986	
October 29	Wofford*	Alumni Memorial Field; Lexington, VA	W 18–17	6,850	
November 5	at Georgia Tech*	Bobby Dodd Stadium; Atlanta, GA	L 7–34	26,923	
November 12	vs. No. 12 The Citadel	Foreman Field; Norfolk, VA (Oyster Bowl, rivalry)	L 20–31	20,000	
November 19	Western Carolina	Alumni Memorial Field; Lexington, VA	W 24–20	3,100	
*Non-conference game; Rankings from NCAA Division I-AA Football Committee Poll released prior to the game

=== NFL draft ===
The following Keydet was selected in the National Football League draft following the season.

Round	Pick	Player	Position	NFL team
6	144	Mark Stock	Wide receiver	Pittsburgh Steelers
