= 1987 Marshall Thundering Herd football team =

American college football season

1987 Marshall Thundering Herd football

NCAA Division I-AA Championship Game, L 42–43 vs. Northeast Louisiana
- Conference: Southern Conference
- Record: 10–5 (4–2 SoCon)
- Head coach: George Chaump (2nd season)
- Defensive coordinator: Jon Tenuta (1st season)
- Captains: Cecil Fletcher; Keith Baxter
- Home stadium: Fairfield Stadium

1987 Southern Conference football standings
	Conf.					Overall
Team	W		L		T	W		L		T
No. 2 Appalachian State $^	7	–	0	–	0	11	–	3	–	0
No. 14 Marshall ^	4	–	2	–	0	10	–	5	–	0
Furman	4	–	3	–	0	7	–	4	–	0
Chattanooga	4	–	3	–	0	6	–	5	–	0
VMI	2	–	4	–	0	4	–	7	–	0
Western Carolina	2	–	4	–	0	4	–	7	–	0
East Tennessee State	2	–	5	–	0	5	–	6	–	0
The Citadel	1	–	5	–	0	4	–	7	–	0
$ – Conference champion; ^ – NCAA Division I-AA playoff participant; Rankings from NCAA Division I-AA Football Committee poll

The 1987 Marshall Thundering Herd football team represented Marshall University as a member of the Southern Conference (SoCon) during the 1987 NCAA Division I-AA football season. Led by second-year head coach George Chaump, the Thundering Herd compiled an overall record of 10–5 with a mark of 4–2 in conference play, placing second in the SoCon. Marshall advanced to the NCAA Division I-AA Football Championship playoffs for the first time in program history, beating James Madison in the first round, Weber State in the quarterfinals, and SoCon champion Appalachian State in the semifinals before losing to Northeast Louisiana in the NCAA Division I-AA Championship Game.

The team played their home games at Fairfield Stadium in Huntington, West Virginia.

== Schedule ==
Date	Opponent	Rank	Site	TV	Result	Attendance	Source
September 5	Morehead State*		Fairfield Stadium; Huntington, WV		W 29–0	15,049	
September 12	at Ohio*		Peden Stadium; Athens, OH (rivalry)		L 15–23		
September 19	at Eastern Kentucky*		Hanger Field; Richmond, KY		L 34–37		
September 26	Youngstown State*		Fairfield Stadium; Huntington, WV		W 38–13		
October 3	at Furman		Paladin Stadium; Greenville, SC		L 36–42	13,122	
October 10	at Louisville*		Cardinal Stadium; Louisville, KY		W 34–31	21,658	
October 17	East Tennessee State^{†}		Fairfield Stadium; Huntington, WV		W 27–7	15,316	
October 24	VMI		Fairfield Stadium; Huntington, WV		W 42–7	12,212	
October 31	at Chattanooga		Chamberlain Field; Chattanooga, TN		W 28–26	6,107	
November 7	at No. 2 Appalachian State	No. 18	Conrad Stadium; Boone, NC (rivalry)		L 10–17	14,306	
November 14	Western Carolina	No. 20	Fairfield Stadium; Huntington, WV		W 47–16	14,423	
November 28	No. 8 James Madison*	No. 14	Fairfield Stadium; Huntington, WV (NCAA Division I-AA First Round)		W 41–12	15,584	
December 5	No. 10 Weber State*	No. 14	Fairfield Stadium; Huntington, WV (NCAA Division I-AA Quarterfinal)		W 51–23	13,197	
December 12	at No. 2 Appalachian State	No. 14	Conrad Stadium; Boone, NC (NCAA Division I-AA Semifinal)		W 24–10	14,621	
December 19	vs. No. 3 Northeast Louisiana*	No. 14	ASISU Minidome; Pocatello, ID (NCAA Division I-AA Championship Game)	ESPN	L 42–43	11,513	
*Non-conference game; ^{†}Homecoming; Rankings from NCAA Division I-AA Football Committee Poll released prior to the game
