= 1988 Furman Paladins football team =

American college football season

1988 Furman Paladins football

NCAA Division I-AA champion SoCon co-champion

NCAA Division I-AA Championship Game, W 17–12 vs. Georgia Southern
- Conference: Southern Conference
- Record: 13–2 (6–1 SoCon)
- Head coach: Jimmy Satterfield (3rd season)
- Captains: Jeff Blankenship; Kennet Goldsmith; Julius Dixon
- Home stadium: Paladin Stadium

1988 Southern Conference football standings
	Conf.					Overall
Team	W		L		T	W		L		T
No. 4 Furman +^	6	–	1	–	0	13	–	2	–	0
No. 6 Marshall +^	6	–	1	–	0	11	–	2	–	0
No. 14 The Citadel ^	5	–	2	–	0	8	–	4	–	0
Appalachian State	4	–	3	–	0	6	–	4	–	1
Chattanooga	3	–	3	–	0	4	–	7	–	0
VMI	1	–	5	–	0	2	–	9	–	0
East Tennessee State	1	–	6	–	0	3	–	8	–	0
Western Carolina	1	–	6	–	0	2	–	9	–	0
+ – Conference co-champions; ^ – NCAA Division I-AA playoff participant; Rankings from NCAA Division I-AA Football Committee poll

The 1988 Furman Paladins football team represented Furman University as a member of the Southern Conference (SoCon) during the 1988 NCAA Division I-AA football season. In their third year under head coach Jimmy Satterfield, the Paladins compiled an overall record of 13–2 with a conference mark of 6–1, sharing the SoCon title with Mashall. Furman advanced to the NCAA Division I-AA Football Championship playoffs, where they defeated Delaware in the first round, Marshall in the quarterfinals, Idaho in the semifinals, and Georgia Southern in the NCAA Division I-AA Championship Game.

== Schedule ==
Date	Opponent	Rank	Site	TV	Result	Attendance	Source
September 3	South Carolina State*		Paladin Stadium; Greenville, SC		W 38–0	13,837	
September 10	at No. 3 (I-A) Clemson*		Memorial Stadium; Clemson, SC		L 3–23	80,620	
September 17	Presbyterian*		Paladin Stadium; Greenville, SC		W 21–0	8,646	
September 24	Newberry*	No. 18	Paladin Stadium; Greenville, SC		W 42–0	15,180	
October 1	VMI	No. 15	Paladin Stadium; Greenville, SC		W 31–13	11,243	
October 8	at No. 4 Marshall	No. T–11	Fairfield Stadium; Huntington, WV		L 10–24	19,371	
October 15	at No. 3 Appalachian State	No. 20	Conrad Stadium; Boone, NC		W 24–9	25,301	
October 29	Western Carolina	No. 10	Paladin Stadium; Greenville, SC		W 31–0	13,014	
November 5	at Chattanooga	No. 10	Chamberlain Field; Chattanooga, TN		W 10–7	4,105	
November 12	at East Tennessee State	No. 5	Memorial Center; Johnson City, TN		W 31–14	4,644	
November 19	No. 9 The Citadel	No. 5	Paladin Stadium; Greenville, SC (rivalry)		W 30–17	16,460	
November 26	No. 15 Delaware*	No. 4	Paladin Stadium; Greenville, SC (NCAA Division I-AA First Round)		W 21–7	7,487	
December 3	at No. 6 Marshall*	No. 4	Fairfield Stadium; Huntington, WV (NCAA Division I-AA Quarterfinal)		W 13–9	16,829	
December 10	No. 1 Idaho*	No. 4	Paladin Stadium; Greenville, SC (NCAA Division I-AA Semifinal)		W 38–7	11,635	
December 17	vs. No. 2 Georgia Southern*	No. 4	Holt Arena; Pocatello, ID (NCAA Division I-AA Championship Game)	ESPN	W 17–12	9,714	
*Non-conference game; Rankings from NCAA Division I-AA Football Committee Poll released prior to the game
