= 1987 VMI Keydets football team =

American college football season

1987 VMI Keydets football
- Conference: Southern Conference
- Record: 4–7 (2–4 SoCon)
- Head coach: Eddie Williamson (3rd season)
- Home stadium: Alumni Memorial Field

1987 Southern Conference football standings
	Conf.					Overall
Team	W		L		T	W		L		T
No. 2 Appalachian State $^	7	–	0	–	0	11	–	3	–	0
No. 14 Marshall ^	4	–	2	–	0	10	–	5	–	0
Furman	4	–	3	–	0	7	–	4	–	0
Chattanooga	4	–	3	–	0	6	–	5	–	0
VMI	2	–	4	–	0	4	–	7	–	0
Western Carolina	2	–	4	–	0	4	–	7	–	0
East Tennessee State	2	–	5	–	0	5	–	6	–	0
The Citadel	1	–	5	–	0	4	–	7	–	0
$ – Conference champion; ^ – NCAA Division I-AA playoff participant; Rankings from NCAA Division I-AA Football Committee poll

The 1987 VMI Keydets football team was an American football team that represented the Virginia Military Institute (VMI) as a member of the Southern Conference (SoCon) during the 1987 NCAA Division I-AA football season. In their third year under head coach Eddie Williamson, the team compiled an overall record of 4–7, with a mark of 2–4 in conference play, tying for fifth place in the SoCon.

== Schedule ==
Date	Opponent	Site	Result	Attendance	Source
September 12	West Virginia Tech*	Alumni Memorial Field; Lexington, VA	W 24–3	5,100	
September 19	at No. 7 Appalachian State	Conrad Stadium; Boone, NC	L 10–27	13,911	
September 26	Wofford*	Alumni Memorial Field; Lexington, VA	W 27–11	6,300	
October 3	at Virginia*	Scott Stadium; Charlottesville, VA	L 0–30	23,500	
October 10	at The Citadel	Johnson Hagood Stadium; Charleston, SC (rivalry)	W 7–3	17,847	
October 17	No. 6 James Madison*	Alumni Memorial Field; Lexington, VA	L 17–20	8,500	
October 24	at Marshall	Fairfield Stadium; Huntington, WV	L 7–42	12,212	
October 31	vs. William & Mary*	Foreman Field; Norfolk, VA (Oyster Bowl, rivalry)	L 6–17	20,500	
November 7	at Furman	Paladin Stadium; Greenville, SC	L 0–38	15,772	
November 14	East Tennessee State	Alumni Memorial Field; Lexington, VA	W 20–13		
November 21	Chattanooga	Alumni Memorial Field; Lexington, VA	L 0–31	3,500	
*Non-conference game; Rankings from NCAA Division I-AA Football Committee Poll released prior to the game
