= 1988 Western Carolina Catamounts football team =

American college football season

1988 Western Carolina Catamounts football
- Conference: Southern Conference
- Record: 2–9 (1–6 SoCon)
- Head coach: Bob Waters (20th season)
- Home stadium: E. J. Whitmire Stadium

1988 Southern Conference football standings
	Conf.					Overall
Team	W		L		T	W		L		T
No. 4 Furman +^	6	–	1	–	0	13	–	2	–	0
No. 6 Marshall +^	6	–	1	–	0	11	–	2	–	0
No. 14 The Citadel ^	5	–	2	–	0	8	–	4	–	0
Appalachian State	4	–	3	–	0	6	–	4	–	1
Chattanooga	3	–	3	–	0	4	–	7	–	0
VMI	1	–	5	–	0	2	–	9	–	0
East Tennessee State	1	–	6	–	0	3	–	8	–	0
Western Carolina	1	–	6	–	0	2	–	9	–	0
+ – Conference co-champions; ^ – NCAA Division I-AA playoff participant; Rankings from NCAA Division I-AA Football Committee poll

The 1988 Western Carolina Catamounts team was an American football team that represented Western Carolina University as a member of the Southern Conference (SoCon) during the 1988 NCAA Division I-AA football season. In their 20th year under head coach Bob Waters, the team compiled an overall record of 2–9, with a mark of 1–6 in conference play, and finished tied for seventh in the SoCon.

== Schedule ==
Date	Opponent	Site	Result	Attendance	Source
September 3	at NC State*	Carter–Finley Stadium; Raleigh, NC	L 6–45	40,300	
September 10	at No. 16 (I-A) South Carolina*	Williams–Brice Stadium; Columbia, SC	L 0–38	68,800	
September 15	East Tennessee State	E. J. Whitmire Stadium; Cullowhee, NC	W 33–23	9,247	
October 1	The Citadel	E. J. Whitmire Stadium; Cullowhee, NC	L 21–27	9,135	
October 8	at Chattanooga	Chamberlain Field; Chattanooga, TN	L 14–19	6,008	
October 15	at North Carolina A&T*	Aggie Stadium; Greensboro, NC	W 45–10	4,875	
October 22	No. 15 Eastern Kentucky*	E. J. Whitmire Stadium; Cullowhee, NC	L 14–32	11,420	
October 29	at No. 10 Furman	Paladin Stadium; Greenville, SC	L 0–31	13,014	
November 5	at No. 16 Appalachian State	Conrad Stadium; Boone, NC (rivalry)	L 21–42	12,375	
November 12	No. 6 Marshall	E. J. Whitmire Stadium; Cullowhee, NC	L 45–52	11,128	
November 19	at VMI	Alumni Memorial Field; Lexington, VA	L 20–24	3,100	
*Non-conference game; Rankings from NCAA Division I-AA Football Committee Poll released prior to the game
