= 1991 East Tennessee State Buccaneers football team =

American college football season

1991 East Tennessee State Buccaneers football
- Conference: Southern Conference
- Record: 1–10 (0–7 SoCon)
- Head coach: Don Riley (4th season)
- Home stadium: Memorial Center

1991 Southern Conference football standings
	Conf.					Overall
Team	W		L		T	W		L		T
No. 17 Appalachian State $^	6	–	1	–	0	8	–	4	–	0
No. 8 Marshall ^	5	–	2	–	0	11	–	4	–	0
No. T–20 The Citadel	5	–	2	–	0	7	–	4	–	0
No. T–20 Furman	4	–	3	–	0	7	–	4	–	0
Chattanooga	4	–	3	–	0	7	–	4	–	0
VMI	2	–	5	–	0	4	–	7	–	0
Western Carolina	2	–	5	–	0	2	–	9	–	0
East Tennessee State	0	–	7	–	0	1	–	10	–	0
$ – Conference champion; ^ – NCAA Division I-AA playoff participant; Rankings from NCAA Division I-AA Football Committee poll

The 1991 East Tennessee State Buccaneers football team was an American football team that represented East Tennessee State University as a member of the Southern Conference (SoCon) during the 1991 NCAA Division I-AA football season. Led by fourth-year head coach Don Riley, the Buccaneers compiled and overall record of 1–10, with a mark of 0–7 in conference play, and finished eighth in the SoCon.

On November 12, 1991, Riley announced his resignation as head coach of the Buccaneers, effective at the end of the season.

== Schedule ==
Date	Opponent	Site	Result	Attendance	Source
September 7	at VMI	Alumni Memorial Field; Lexington, VA	L 20–35	5,800	
September 14	Samford*	Memorial Center; Johnson City, TN	L 6–31	3,207	
September 21	Western Carolina	Memorial Center; Johnson City, TN	L 15–29	3,319	
September 28	Newberry*	Memorial Center; Johnson City, TN	W 43–12	2,644	
October 5	at South Carolina*	Williams–Brice Stadium; Columbia, SC	L 7–55	55,832	
October 12	No. 17 Appalachian State	Memorial Center; Johnson City, TN	L 14–21	5,416	
October 19	North Carolina A&T*	Memorial Center; Johnson City, TN	L 13–38		
November 2	at No. 13 Furman	Paladin Stadium; Greenville, SC	L 23–52	12,922	
November 9	Chattanooga	Memorial Center; Johnson City, TN	L 26–43	3,888	
November 16	The Citadel	Memorial Center; Johnson City, TN	L 7–17	3,017	
November 23	at No. 8 Marshall	Marshall University Stadium; Huntington, WV	L 9–63	18,256	
*Non-conference game; Rankings from NCAA Division I-AA Football Committee Poll released prior to the game
