= 1988 Marshall Thundering Herd football team =

American college football season

1988 Marshall Thundering Herd football

SoCon co-champion

NCAA Division I-AA Quarterfinal, L 9–13 vs. Furman
- Conference: Southern Conference
- Record: 11–2 (6–1 SoCon)
- Head coach: George Chaump (3rd season)
- Captains: John Spellacy; Sean Doctor
- Home stadium: Fairfield Stadium

1988 Southern Conference football standings
	Conf.					Overall
Team	W		L		T	W		L		T
No. 4 Furman +^	6	–	1	–	0	13	–	2	–	0
No. 6 Marshall +^	6	–	1	–	0	11	–	2	–	0
No. 14 The Citadel ^	5	–	2	–	0	8	–	4	–	0
Appalachian State	4	–	3	–	0	6	–	4	–	1
Chattanooga	3	–	3	–	0	4	–	7	–	0
VMI	1	–	5	–	0	2	–	9	–	0
East Tennessee State	1	–	6	–	0	3	–	8	–	0
Western Carolina	1	–	6	–	0	2	–	9	–	0
+ – Conference co-champions; ^ – NCAA Division I-AA playoff participant; Rankings from NCAA Division I-AA Football Committee poll

The 1988 Marshall Thundering Herd football team represented Marshall University as a member of the Southern Conference (SoCon) during the 1988 NCAA Division I-AA football season. Led by third-year head coach George Chaump, the Thundering Herd compiled an overall record of 11–2 with a mark of 6–1 in conference play, sharing the SoCon title with Furman. Marshall advanced to the NCAA Division I-AA Championship playoffs, where they beat North Texas in the first round before losing to Furman in the quarterfinals.

== Schedule ==
Date	Opponent	Rank	Site	Result	Attendance	Source
September 3	at Morehead State*	No. 10	Jayne Stadium; Morehead, KY	W 30–17	9,500	
September 10	Ohio*	No. 10	Fairfield Stadium; Huntington, WV (rivalry)	W 31–14		
September 17	No. T–3 Eastern Kentucky*	No. 10	Fairfield Stadium; Huntington, WV	W 34–32		
September 24	at VMI	No. 3	Alumni Memorial Field; Lexington, VA	W 24–20	6,750	
October 8	No. 11 Furman^{†}	No. 4	Fairfield Stadium; Huntington, WV	W 24–10	19,371	
October 15	at East Tennessee State	No. 4	Memorial Center; Johnson City, TN	W 50–14		
October 22	Chattanooga	No. 3	Fairfield Stadium; Huntington, WV	W 38–7	13,298	
October 29	No. 11 Appalachian State	No. 2	Fairfield Stadium; Huntington, WV (rivalry)	W 30–27	16,447	
November 5	at No. 19 The Citadel	No. 1	Johnson Hagood Stadium; Charleston, SC	L 3–20	20,011	
November 12	at Western Carolina	No. 6	E. J. Whitmire Stadium; Cullowhee, NC	W 52–45	11,128	
November 19	at Youngstown State*	No. 7	Stambaugh Stadium; Youngstown, OH	W 38–15	6,225	
November 26	No. 10 North Texas*	No. 6	Fairfield Stadium; Huntington, WV (NCAA Division I-AA First Round)	W 7–0	15,086	
December 3	No. 4 Furman	No. 6	Fairfield Stadium; Huntington, WV (NCAA Division I-AA Quarterfinal)	L 9–13	16,829	
*Non-conference game; ^{†}Homecoming; Rankings from NCAA Division I-AA Football Committee Poll released prior to the game
