= 1991 VMI Keydets football team =

American college football season

1991 VMI Keydets football
- Conference: Southern Conference
- Record: 4–7 (2–5 SoCon)
- Head coach: Jim Shuck (3rd season)
- Home stadium: Alumni Memorial Field

1991 Southern Conference football standings
	Conf.					Overall
Team	W		L		T	W		L		T
No. 17 Appalachian State $^	6	–	1	–	0	8	–	4	–	0
No. 8 Marshall ^	5	–	2	–	0	11	–	4	–	0
No. T–20 The Citadel	5	–	2	–	0	7	–	4	–	0
No. T–20 Furman	4	–	3	–	0	7	–	4	–	0
Chattanooga	4	–	3	–	0	7	–	4	–	0
VMI	2	–	5	–	0	4	–	7	–	0
Western Carolina	2	–	5	–	0	2	–	9	–	0
East Tennessee State	0	–	7	–	0	1	–	10	–	0
$ – Conference champion; ^ – NCAA Division I-AA playoff participant; Rankings from NCAA Division I-AA Football Committee poll

The 1991 VMI Keydets football team was an American football team that represented the Virginia Military Institute (VMI) as a member of the Southern Conference (SoCon) during the 1991 NCAA Division I-AA football season. In their third year under head coach Jim Shuck, the team compiled an overall record of 4–7, with a mark of 2–5 in conference play, tying for sixth place in the SoCon.

== Schedule ==
Date	Opponent	Site	Result	Attendance	Source
September 7	East Tennessee State	Alumni Memorial Field; Lexington, VA	W 35–20	5,800	
September 14	at Appalachian State	Kidd Brewer Stadium; Boone, NC	L 19–24	10,731	
September 21	Lafayette*	Alumni Memorial Field; Lexington, VA	W 42–21	6,825	
September 28	at Richmond*	City Stadium; Richmond, VA (rivalry)	W 38–27	20,052	
October 5	Furman	Alumni Memorial Field; Lexington, VA	L 28–46	8,223	
October 12	William & Mary*	Alumni Memorial Field; Lexington, VA (rivalry)	L 26–40	7,737	
October 26	vs. The Citadel	Foreman Field; Norfolk, VA (Oyster Bowl, rivalry)	L 14–17	20,480	
November 2	at Virginia*	Scott Stadium; Charlottesville, VA	L 0–42	39,000	
November 9	Western Carolina	Alumni Memorial Field; Lexington, VA	W 27–25	4,178	
November 16	at No. 10 Marshall	Marshall University Stadium; Huntington, WV	L 0–61	17,535	
November 23	at Chattanooga	Chamberlain Field; Chattanooga, TN	L 14–50	3,232	
*Non-conference game; Rankings from NCAA Division I-AA Football Committee Poll released prior to the game
