= Buddy Nix =

American football player, coach, and executive (born 1939)

Biographical details
- Born: December 6, 1939 (age 86); Carbon Hill, Alabama, U.S.

Playing career
- 1957–1960: Livingston
- Positions: Fullback, linebacker

Coaching career (HC unless noted)
- 1962–1964: Anniston HS (AL) (assistant)
- 1965–1966: Eufaula HS (AL)
- 1967–1968: Jonesboro HS (GA)
- 1969: Carson–Newman (DL)
- 1970–1971: Livingston (assistant)
- 1972–1975: Southern Miss (LB)
- 1976–1980: Auburn (DB)
- 1981–1983: LSU (DC/ILB)
- 1984–1992: Chattanooga

Administrative career (AD unless noted)
- 1993–2000: Buffalo Bills (scout)
- 2001–2008: San Diego Chargers (DPP/AGM)
- 2009–2013: Buffalo Bills (EVP/GM)

Head coaching record
- Overall: 44–54–1 (college)

Charles Kenneth "Buddy" Nix (born December 6, 1939) is an American former football coach and executive. He was the general manager of the Buffalo Bills of the National Football League (NFL) from 2009 to 2013. Nix was a scout for the Bills from 1993 to 2000. He joined John Butler and A. J. Smith with the San Diego Chargers from 2001 to 2008 and returned to the Bills in 2009.

== Early years ==
Nix was born in Carbon Hill, Alabama, where he later attended Talladega High School and played linebacker. Nix attended Livingston University (now the University of West Alabama) in Livingston, Alabama, playing fullback on its football team.

== Coaching career ==
Nix was head coach at Eufaula High School in Eufaula, Alabama, leading the Tigers to their first Border Conference championship in 1966.

=== Chattanooga ===
Nix had a successful college football coaching career at the University of Tennessee at Chattanooga. He was responsible for recruiting star wide receiver Terrell Owens.

== Administrative career ==
=== Buffalo Bills ===
Nix was a regional scout under John Butler from 1993 to 2000 for the Buffalo Bills, specializing in the Southeastern United States.

=== San Diego Chargers ===
Nix left Buffalo with Butler and A. J. Smith after the 2000 season. He was initially the director of pro player personnel (2000–2001), but after Butler died, Smith was promoted to general manager, and Nix to assistant general manager.

Nix's job with the San Diego Chargers was to oversee both professional and college scouting and to be one of the main decision makers in each NFL draft. Nix was a major reason the Chargers turned around from a losing football team to a rebuilt, winning team. In 2004, three players Nix drafted were selected to the 2005 Pro Bowl. In 2005, six players Nix drafted were selected to the 2006 Pro Bowl. In 2006, eleven players Nix drafted were selected to the 2007 Pro Bowl. In 2007, eight players Nix drafted were selected to the 2008 Pro Bowl.

The Chargers won four of the last five AFC West titles with Nix as assistant GM and director of player personnel, in charge of college scouting and instrumental to the decision making process of their NFL drafts.

=== Buffalo Bills ===
Nix was hired as a national scout for the Buffalo Bills on January 26, 2009. He was named general manager of the Buffalo Bills on December 31, 2009, after Russ Brandon was promoted to CEO.

He extended the contract of running back Fred Jackson before Jackson was allowed to hit free agency. He also extended quarterback Ryan Fitzpatrick's contract. This cleared the way for him to work to re-sign wide receiver Stevie Johnson once he hit free agency and then work to improve his defense by adding Mario Williams.

Following the 2012 season, Nix and Tampa Bay Buccaneers GM Mark Dominik fell victim to a prank call. In particular, Nix inadvertently revealed that he was unhappy with Fitzpatrick's contract, stating "we just can't afford to pay that kind of money for a guy who's fighting for probably a backup job". Shortly after the leaked phone call was reported on by Deadspin, the team parted ways with Fitzpatrick, releasing him on March 12, 2013 before he was due a $3 million bonus, with NFL.com speculating that Fitzpatrick likely asked for his release following the leak. The Bills organization later referred the incident to legal counsel.

On May 13, 2013 the Bills announced that Nix would step away from his role as GM and transition to special assistant.

== Personal life ==
Nix has three children: Steve Nix (wife: Sherry) and Stan Nix, and Stacey Barnett (husband: Alan). Nix also has six grandchildren: Hope Willoughby(husband: Matt), Ana Nix, Tyler Nix, Dakota Nix, Sawyer Barnett and Tucker Barnett. He is the great-grandfather to Lara Kate, Olivia, Ahlani, MJ, and Roman.

His wife is Diann Abernathy of Lafayette, Alabama.

== Head coaching record ==
=== College ===
Year	Team	Overall	Conference	Standing	Bowl/playoffs
Chattanooga Moccasins (Southern Conference) (1984–1992)
1984	Chattanooga	6–5	5–1	1st	L NCAA Division I-AA First Round
1985	Chattanooga	6–5	5–2	3rd	
1986	Chattanooga	4–7	2–4	6th	
1987	Chattanooga	6–5	4–3	T–3rd	
1988	Chattanooga	4–7	3–3	5th	
1989	Chattanooga	3–7–1	2–4–1	5th	
1990	Chattanooga	6–5	4–2	3rd	
1991	Chattanooga	7–4	4–3	T-4th	
1992	Chattanooga	2–9	0–7	8th	
Chattanooga:		44–54–1	29–29–1		
Total:		44–54–1			
