= 1988 The Citadel Bulldogs football team =

American college football season

1988 The Citadel Bulldogs football
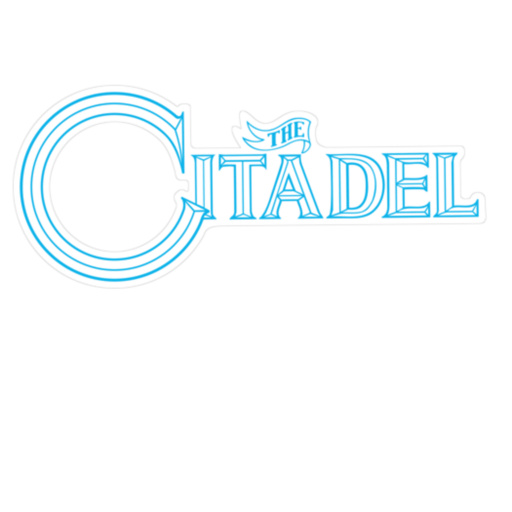

I-AA First Round, L 20–38 vs. Georgia Southern
- Conference: Southern Conference
- Record: 8–4 (5–2 SoCon)
- Head coach: Charlie Taaffe (2nd season)
- Offensive scheme: Option
- Home stadium: Johnson Hagood Stadium

1988 Southern Conference football standings
	Conf.					Overall
Team	W		L		T	W		L		T
No. 4 Furman +^	6	–	1	–	0	13	–	2	–	0
No. 6 Marshall +^	6	–	1	–	0	11	–	2	–	0
No. 14 The Citadel ^	5	–	2	–	0	8	–	4	–	0
Appalachian State	4	–	3	–	0	6	–	4	–	1
Chattanooga	3	–	3	–	0	4	–	7	–	0
VMI	1	–	5	–	0	2	–	9	–	0
East Tennessee State	1	–	6	–	0	3	–	8	–	0
Western Carolina	1	–	6	–	0	2	–	9	–	0
+ – Conference co-champions; ^ – NCAA Division I-AA playoff participant; Rankings from NCAA Division I-AA Football Committee poll

The 1988 The Citadel Bulldogs football team represented The Citadel, The Military College of South Carolina in the 1988 NCAA Division I-AA football season. The Bulldogs were led by second-year head coach Charlie Taaffe and played their home games at Johnson Hagood Stadium. They played as members of the Southern Conference, as they have since 1936. In 1988, The Citadel made its first appearance in the I-AA playoffs.

== Schedule ==
Date	Opponent	Rank	Site	Result	Attendance	Source
September 3	at Appalachian State		Conrad Stadium; Boone, NC	L 14–38	13,428	
September 10	Presbyterian*		Johnson Hagood Stadium; Charleston, SC	W 35–9		
September 17	at Duke*		Wallace Wade Stadium; Durham, NC	L 17–41	12,400	
September 24	Navy*		Johnson Hagood Stadium; Charleston, SC	W 42–35	20,754	
October 1	at Western Carolina		E. J. Whitmire Stadium; Cullowhee, NC	W 27–21	9,135	
October 15	Chattanooga		Johnson Hagood Stadium; Charleston, SC	W 23–17	16,457	
October 22	Boston University*		Johnson Hagood Stadium; Charleston, SC	W 24–13	13,123	
October 29	East Tennessee State	No. 18	Johnson Hagood Stadium; Charleston, SC	W 48–21	10,110	
November 5	No. 1 Marshall^{†}	No. 19	Johnson Hagood Stadium; Charleston, SC	W 20–3	20,011	
November 12	vs. VMI	No. 12	Foreman Field; Norfolk, VA (Military Classic of the South)	W 31–20	20,000	
November 19	at No. 5 Furman	No. 9	Paladin Stadium; Greenville, SC (rivalry)	L 17–30	16,460	
November 26	at No. 2 Georgia Southern*	No. 14	Paulson Stadium; Statesboro, GA (NCAA Division I-AA First Round)	L 20–38	11,011	
*Non-conference game; ^{†}Homecoming; Rankings from NCAA Division I-AA Football Committee Poll released prior to the game
