= 1991 Western Carolina Catamounts football team =

American college football season

1991 Western Carolina Catamounts football
- Conference: Southern Conference
- Record: 2–9 (2–5 SoCon)
- Head coach: Steve Hodgin (2nd season)
- Home stadium: E. J. Whitmire Stadium

1991 Southern Conference football standings
	Conf.					Overall
Team	W		L		T	W		L		T
No. 17 Appalachian State $^	6	–	1	–	0	8	–	4	–	0
No. 8 Marshall ^	5	–	2	–	0	11	–	4	–	0
No. T–20 The Citadel	5	–	2	–	0	7	–	4	–	0
No. T–20 Furman	4	–	3	–	0	7	–	4	–	0
Chattanooga	4	–	3	–	0	7	–	4	–	0
VMI	2	–	5	–	0	4	–	7	–	0
Western Carolina	2	–	5	–	0	2	–	9	–	0
East Tennessee State	0	–	7	–	0	1	–	10	–	0
$ – Conference champion; ^ – NCAA Division I-AA playoff participant; Rankings from NCAA Division I-AA Football Committee poll

The 1991 Western Carolina Catamounts team was an American football team that represented Western Carolina University as a member of the Southern Conference (SoCon) during the 1991 NCAA Division I-AA football season. In their second year under head coach Steve Hodgin, the team compiled an overall record of 2–9, with a mark of 2–5 in conference play, and finished tied for sixth in the SoCon.

== Schedule ==
Date	Opponent	Site	Result	Attendance	Source
August 31	at Georgia*	Sanford Stadium; Athens, GA	L 0–48	78,512	
September 14	at Wake Forest*	Groves Stadium; Winston-Salem, NC	L 24–40	22,352	
September 21	at East Tennessee State	Memorial Center; Johnson City, TN	W 29–15	3,319	
September 28	No. 3 Furman	E. J. Whitmire Stadium; Cullowhee, NC	L 14–42	12,445	
October 5	at The Citadel	Johnson Hagood Stadium; Charleston, SC	L 13–38	13,811	
October 12	at Georgia Southern*	Paulson Stadium; Statesboro, GA	L 6–44	19,190	
October 19	Chattanooga	E. J. Whitmire Stadium; Cullowhee, NC	W 27–24	8,870	
October 26	Samford*	E. J. Whitmire Stadium; Cullowhee, NC	L 3–16		
November 2	at No. 19 Marshall	Marshall University Stadium; Huntington, WV	L 24–27 ^{3OT}	20,466	
November 9	at VMI	Alumni Memorial Field; Lexington, VA	L 25–27	4,178	
November 16	No. 18 Appalachian State	E. J. Whitmire Stadium; Cullowhee, NC (rivalry)	L 14–24	11,633	
*Non-conference game; Rankings from NCAA Division I-AA Football Committee Poll released prior to the game
