= 1991 Chattanooga Moccasins football team =

American college football season

1991 Chattanooga Moccasins football
- Conference: Southern Conference
- Record: 7–4 (4–3 SoCon)
- Head coach: Buddy Nix (8th season)
- Captains: Pumpy Tudors; Jackie Washington; Muhammad Shamsid-Deen
- Home stadium: Chamberlain Field

1991 Southern Conference football standings
	Conf.					Overall
Team	W		L		T	W		L		T
No. 17 Appalachian State $^	6	–	1	–	0	8	–	4	–	0
No. 8 Marshall ^	5	–	2	–	0	11	–	4	–	0
No. T–20 The Citadel	5	–	2	–	0	7	–	4	–	0
No. T–20 Furman	4	–	3	–	0	7	–	4	–	0
Chattanooga	4	–	3	–	0	7	–	4	–	0
VMI	2	–	5	–	0	4	–	7	–	0
Western Carolina	2	–	5	–	0	2	–	9	–	0
East Tennessee State	0	–	7	–	0	1	–	10	–	0
$ – Conference champion; ^ – NCAA Division I-AA playoff participant; Rankings from NCAA Division I-AA Football Committee poll

The 1991 Chattanooga Moccasins football team represented the University of Tennessee at Chattanooga as a member of the Southern Conference (SoCon) in the 1991 NCAA Division I-AA football season. The Moccasins were led by eighth-year head coach Buddy Nix and played their home games at Chamberlain Field. Southern Conference. They finished the season 7–4 overall and 4–3 in SoCon play to tie for fourth place.

== Schedule ==
Date	Opponent	Rank	Site	Result	Attendance	Source
August 30	Tennessee–Martin*		Chamberlain Field; Chattanooga, TN	W 21–14	9,531	
September 7	Tennessee Tech*		Chamberlain Field; Chattanooga, TN	W 35–14	9,907	
September 21	The Citadel	No. 13	Chamberlain Field; Chattanooga, TN	W 33–26	8,921	
September 28	at Appalachian State	No. 10	Kidd Brewer Stadium; Boone, NC	L 7–42	18,711	
October 5	at No. 20 (I-A) Alabama*		Bryant–Denny Stadium; Tuscaloosa, AL	L 7–53	76,543	
October 19	at Western Carolina		Whitmire Stadium; Cullowhee, NC	L 24–27	8,870	
October 26	No. 6 Marshall^{†}		Chamberlain Field; Chattanooga, TN	W 38–31	8,026	
November 2	Western Kentucky*		Chamberlain Field; Chattanooga, TN	W 26–22	7,102	
November 9	at East Tennessee State		Memorial Center; Johnson City, TN	W 43–26	3,888	
November 16	at No. 12 Furman		Paladin Stadium; Greenville, SC	L 21–24	16,579	
November 23	VMI		Chamberlain Field; Chattanooga, TN	W 50–14	3,232	
*Non-conference game; ^{†}Homecoming; Rankings from NCAA Division I-AA Football Committee Poll released prior to the game

== After the season ==
=== NFL draft ===
The following Moccasin was selected in the 1992 NFL draft after the season.

Round	Pick	Player	Position	NFL team
6	141	Shoun Habersham	Wide receiver	Indianapolis Colts
