= Don Riley (American football) =

American football player and coach (1933–2022)

Biographical details
- Born: May 10, 1933; Dungannon, Virginia, U.S.
- Died: December 12, 2022 (aged 89)

Playing career
- 1953–1955: East Tennessee State

Coaching career (HC unless noted)
- 1956: East Tennessee State (assistant)
- 1957–1959: Lynch HS (KY)
- 1960–1965: Greeneville HS (TN)
- 1966–1971: Vanderbilt (freshmen / defensive assistant)
- 1972–1975: Oklahoma State (LB)
- 1976–1987: UCLA (OL)
- 1988–1991: East Tennessee State

Head coaching record
- Overall: 10–34 (college)

Don Dayton Riley (May 10, 1933 – December 12, 2022) was an American football player and coach. Riley served as a high school head football coach, college assistant, and as the head football coach at East Tennessee State University in Johnson City, Tennessee, from 1998 to 1991.

== Coaching career ==
=== High school ===
After a single season as an assistant coach at East Tennessee State, Riley served as head coach at Lynch High School in Lynch, Kentucky, from 1957 to 1959. At Lynch, he was named Southeastern Kentucky Coach of the Year in 1958 and led the school to the Class A Kentucky State Championship in 1959. Riley next was hired to serve as both head football coach and athletic director at Greeneville High School. During his six years as head coach at Greeneville, Riley compiled a record of 41–25.

=== College assistant coach ===
In 1966 he was hired at Vanderbilt where he coached the freshman team and served as a defensive assistant through the 1971 season. In July 1972 he was hired at Oklahoma State to serve as linebackers coach through the 1975 season. Riley then served as offensive line coach at UCLA from 1976 to 1987.

=== College head coach ===
On February 1, 1988, Riley was formally introduced as the 13th all-time head coach at East Tennessee State. On November 12, 1991, he announced his resignation as head coach of the Buccaneers, effective the end of the season. His record as head coach at East Tennessee State was 10–34.

== Head coaching record ==
=== College ===
Year	Team	Overall	Conference	Standing	Bowl/playoffs
East Tennessee State Buccaneers (Southern Conference) (1988–1991)
1988	East Tennessee State	3–8	1–6	T–7th	
1989	East Tennessee State	4–7	4–3	T–3rd	
1990	East Tennessee State	2–9	1–6	8th	
1991	East Tennessee State	1–10	0–7	8th	
East Tennessee State:		10–34	6–22		
Total:		10–34			
