= 1987 Furman Paladins football team =

American college football season

1987 Furman Paladins football
- Conference: Southern Conference
- Record: 7–4 (4–3 SoCon)
- Head coach: Jimmy Satterfield (2nd season)
- Captains: Chris Speaks; Darryl Gardner; Phillip Ferguson; Tim Stepp
- Home stadium: Paladin Stadium

1987 Southern Conference football standings
	Conf.					Overall
Team	W		L		T	W		L		T
No. 2 Appalachian State $^	7	–	0	–	0	11	–	3	–	0
No. 14 Marshall ^	4	–	2	–	0	10	–	5	–	0
Furman	4	–	3	–	0	7	–	4	–	0
Chattanooga	4	–	3	–	0	6	–	5	–	0
VMI	2	–	4	–	0	4	–	7	–	0
Western Carolina	2	–	4	–	0	4	–	7	–	0
East Tennessee State	2	–	5	–	0	5	–	6	–	0
The Citadel	1	–	5	–	0	4	–	7	–	0
$ – Conference champion; ^ – NCAA Division I-AA playoff participant; Rankings from NCAA Division I-AA Football Committee poll

The 1987 Furman Paladins football team was an American football team that represented Furman University as a member of the Southern Conference (SoCon) during the 1987 NCAA Division I-AA football season. In their first year under head coach Jimmy Satterfield, the Paladins compiled an overall record of 7–4 with a conference mark of 4–3, placing third in the SoCon.

== Schedule ==
Date	Opponent	Rank	Site	Result	Attendance	Source
September 5	at South Carolina State*	No. 13	Oliver C. Dawson Stadium; Orangeburg, SC	W 25–7	11,803	
September 12	Presbyterian*	No. 13	Paladin Stadium; Greenville, SC	W 23–3	9,658	
September 19	at Western Carolina	No. 10	Whitmire Stadium; Cullowhee, NC	L 14–20	10,334	
September 26	Chattanooga	No. 18	Paladin Stadium; Greenville, SC	L 14–16	9,377	
October 3	Marshall		Paladin Stadium; Greenville, SC	W 42–36	13,122	
October 10	No. 16 East Tennessee State		Paladin Stadium; Greenville, SC	W 24–13	9,000	
October 17	No. 3 Appalachian State		Paladin Stadium; Greenville, SC	L 8–16	13,147	
October 31	at Davidson*		Richardson Stadium; Davidson, NC	W 58–3		
November 7	VMI		Paladin Stadium; Greenville, SC	W 38–0	15,772	
November 14	at No. 4 (I-A) Florida State*		Doak Campbell Stadium; Tallahassee, FL	L 10–41	50,087	
November 21	at The Citadel		Johnson Hagood Stadium; Charleston, SC (rivalry)	W 58–13	15,579	
*Non-conference game; Rankings from NCAA Division I-AA Football Committee Poll released prior to the game
