= 1988 East Tennessee State Buccaneers football team =

American college football season

1988 East Tennessee State Buccaneers football
- Conference: Southern Conference
- Record: 3–8 (1–6 SoCon)
- Head coach: Don Riley (1st season)
- Home stadium: Memorial Center

1988 Southern Conference football standings
	Conf.					Overall
Team	W		L		T	W		L		T
No. 4 Furman +^	6	–	1	–	0	13	–	2	–	0
No. 6 Marshall +^	6	–	1	–	0	11	–	2	–	0
No. 14 The Citadel ^	5	–	2	–	0	8	–	4	–	0
Appalachian State	4	–	3	–	0	6	–	4	–	1
Chattanooga	3	–	3	–	0	4	–	7	–	0
VMI	1	–	5	–	0	2	–	9	–	0
East Tennessee State	1	–	6	–	0	3	–	8	–	0
Western Carolina	1	–	6	–	0	2	–	9	–	0
+ – Conference co-champions; ^ – NCAA Division I-AA playoff participant; Rankings from NCAA Division I-AA Football Committee poll

The 1988 East Tennessee State Buccaneers football team was an American football team that represented East Tennessee State University as a member of the Southern Conference (SoCon) during the 1988 NCAA Division I-AA football season. Led by first-year head coach Don Riley, the Buccaneers compiled and overall record of 3–8, with a mark of 1–6 in conference play, and finished tied for seventh in the SoCon.

== Schedule ==
Date	Opponent	Site	Result	Attendance	Source
September 3	VMI	Memorial Center; Johnson City, TN	W 26–10	5,750	
September 10	Wofford*	Memorial Center; Johnson City, TN	W 21–7		
September 15	at Western Carolina	E. J. Whitmire Stadium; Cullowhee, NC	L 23–33	9,247	
September 24	No. 2 (D-II) UCF*	Memorial Center; Johnson City, TN	L 17–23	5,447	
October 1	at Chattanooga	Chamberlain Field; Chattanooga, TN	L 10–33	8,301	
October 8	at NC State*	Carter–Finley Stadium; Raleigh, NC	L 0–49	39,300	
October 15	No. 4 Marshall	Memorial Center; Johnson City, TN	L 14–50		
October 22	at No. 13 Appalachian State	Conrad Stadium; Boone, NC	L 3–51	8,106	
October 29	at No. 18 The Citadel	Johnson Hagood Stadium; Charleston, SC	L 21–48	10,110	
November 5	Davidson*	Memorial Center; Johnson City, TN	W 31–28	4,160	
November 12	No. 5 Furman	Memorial Center; Johnson City, TN	L 14–31	4,644	
*Non-conference game; Rankings from NCAA Division I-AA Football Committee Poll released prior to the game
