= 1987 The Citadel Bulldogs football team =

American college football season

1987 The Citadel Bulldogs football
- Conference: Southern Conference
- Record: 4–7 (1–5 SoCon)
- Head coach: Charlie Taaffe (1st season)
- Home stadium: Johnson Hagood Stadium

1987 Southern Conference football standings
	Conf.					Overall
Team	W		L		T	W		L		T
No. 2 Appalachian State $^	7	–	0	–	0	11	–	3	–	0
No. 14 Marshall ^	4	–	2	–	0	10	–	5	–	0
Furman	4	–	3	–	0	7	–	4	–	0
Chattanooga	4	–	3	–	0	6	–	5	–	0
VMI	2	–	4	–	0	4	–	7	–	0
Western Carolina	2	–	4	–	0	4	–	7	–	0
East Tennessee State	2	–	5	–	0	5	–	6	–	0
The Citadel	1	–	5	–	0	4	–	7	–	0
$ – Conference champion; ^ – NCAA Division I-AA playoff participant; Rankings from NCAA Division I-AA Football Committee poll

The 1987 The Citadel Bulldogs football team represented The Citadel, The Military College of South Carolina in the 1987 NCAA Division I-AA football season. Charlie Taaffe served as head coach for the first season. The Bulldogs played as members of the Southern Conference and played home games at Johnson Hagood Stadium.

== Schedule ==
Date	Opponent	Site	Result	Attendance	Source
September 6	Wofford*	Johnson Hagood Stadium; Charleston, SC (rivalry)	W 38–0	11,470	
September 12	at Georgia Tech*	Grant Field; Atlanta, GA	L 12–51	31,211	
September 19	Presbyterian*	Johnson Hagood Stadium; Charleston, SC	W 27–12	10,906	
September 26	at Army*	Mitchie Stadium; West Point, NY	L 6–48	37,548	
October 10	VMI	Johnson Hagood Stadium; Charleston, SC (Military Classic of the South)	L 3–7	17,847	
October 17	at Chattanooga	Chamberlain Field; Chattanooga, TN	L 19–22	8,973	
October 24	at East Tennessee State	Memorial Center; Johnson City, TN	L 21–24	9,682	
October 31	No. 18 Western Carolina	Johnson Hagood Stadium; Charleston, SC	W 38–24	10,339	
November 7	at Boston University*	Nickerson Field; Boston, MA	W 34–7	2,103	
November 14	No. 2 Appalachian State^{†}	Johnson Hagood Stadium; Charleston, SC	L 17–27	17,349	
November 21	Furman	Johnson Hagood Stadium; Charleston, SC (rivalry)	L 13–58	15,579	
*Non-conference game; ^{†}Homecoming; Rankings from NCAA Division I-AA Football Committee Poll released prior to the game

== NFL Draft selections ==
Year	Round	Pick	Overall	Name	Team	Position
1987	9	23	246	Greg Davis	Tampa Bay Buccaneers	K
