= Julius Dixon (American football) =

American football player and coach

Current position
- Record: 15–29

Playing career
- 1985–1988: Furman
- Position: Defensive back

Coaching career (HC unless noted)
- 1994–2006: Furman (DL/DB)
- 2007: Presbyterian (DC)
- 2010: Savannah State (interim HC)
- 2013: Reinhardt (DB)
- 2014–2015: Shorter (DC)
- 2016–2021: Point

Head coaching record
- Overall: 19–55

Julius Dixon is an American football coach and former player. He is the former head football coach at Point University in West Point, Georgia, a position he has held since 2016. Dixon served as the interim head football coach at Savannah State University in 2010.

== Head coaching record ==
Year	Team	Overall	Conference	Standing	Bowl/playoffs
Savannah State Tigers (Mid-Eastern Athletic Conference) (2010)
2010	Savannah State	1–10	N/A	N/A	
Savannah State:		1–10			
Point Skyhawks (Sun Conference) (2016)
2016	Point	4–6	2–3	4th	
Point Skyhawks (Mid-South Conference) (2017)
2017	Point	3–8	1–5	T–6th (Appalachian)	
2018	Point	3–8	2–4	4th (Appalachian)	
2019	Point	5–7	4–2	3rd (Appalachian)	
2020–21	Point	1–7	1–5	6th (Appalachian)	
2021	Point	2–9	2–4	5th (Appalachian)	
Point:		18–45	12–23		
Total:		19–55			
