= 1991 The Citadel Bulldogs football team =

American college football season

1991 The Citadel Bulldogs football
- Conference: Southern Conference
- Record: 7–4 (5–2 SoCon)
- Head coach: Charlie Taaffe (5th season)
- Offensive scheme: Option
- Defensive coordinator: Don Powers (3rd season)
- Home stadium: Johnson Hagood Stadium

1991 Southern Conference football standings
	Conf.					Overall
Team	W		L		T	W		L		T
No. 17 Appalachian State $^	6	–	1	–	0	8	–	4	–	0
No. 8 Marshall ^	5	–	2	–	0	11	–	4	–	0
No. T–20 The Citadel	5	–	2	–	0	7	–	4	–	0
No. T–20 Furman	4	–	3	–	0	7	–	4	–	0
Chattanooga	4	–	3	–	0	7	–	4	–	0
VMI	2	–	5	–	0	4	–	7	–	0
Western Carolina	2	–	5	–	0	2	–	9	–	0
East Tennessee State	0	–	7	–	0	1	–	10	–	0
$ – Conference champion; ^ – NCAA Division I-AA playoff participant; Rankings from NCAA Division I-AA Football Committee poll

The 1991 The Citadel Bulldogs football team represented The Citadel, The Military College of South Carolina in the 1991 NCAA Division I-AA football season. Charlie Taaffe served as head coach for the fifth season. The Bulldogs played as members of the Southern Conference and played home games at Johnson Hagood Stadium.

== Schedule ==
Date	Opponent	Site	Result	Attendance	Source
September 7	Presbyterian*	Johnson Hagood Stadium; Charleston, SC	W 33–10	17,660	
September 14	Wofford*	Johnson Hagood Stadium; Charleston, SC (rivalry)	L 12–15	19,311	
September 21	at Chattanooga	Chamberlain Field; Chattanooga, TN	L 26–33	8,921	
October 5	Western Carolina	Johnson Hagood Stadium; Charleston, SC	W 38–13	13,811	
October 12	at Army*	Mitchie Stadium; West Point, NY	W 20–14	40,459	
October 19	at William & Mary*	Zable Stadium; Williamsburg, VA	L 17–24	15,621–16,621	
October 26	vs. VMI	Foreman Field; Norfolk, VA (Oyster Bowl, Military Classic of the South)	W 17–14	20,480	
November 2	No. 9 Appalachian State	Johnson Hagood Stadium; Charleston, SC	W 17–10	20,071	
November 9	at No. 13 Marshall	Marshall University Stadium; Huntington, WA	L 31–37	18,003	
November 16	at East Tennessee State	Memorial Center; Johnson City, TN	W 17–7	3,017	
November 23	Furman^{†}	Johnson Hagood Stadium; Charleston, SC (rivalry)	W 10–6	21,623	
*Non-conference game; ^{†}Homecoming; Rankings from NCAA Division I-AA Football Committee Poll released prior to the game
