= 1987 Western Carolina Catamounts football team =

American college football season

1987 Western Carolina Catamounts football
- Conference: Southern Conference
- Record: 4–7 (2–4 SoCon)
- Head coach: Bob Waters (19th season)
- Home stadium: E. J. Whitmire Stadium

1987 Southern Conference football standings
	Conf.					Overall
Team	W		L		T	W		L		T
No. 2 Appalachian State $^	7	–	0	–	0	11	–	3	–	0
No. 14 Marshall ^	4	–	2	–	0	10	–	5	–	0
Furman	4	–	3	–	0	7	–	4	–	0
Chattanooga	4	–	3	–	0	6	–	5	–	0
VMI	2	–	4	–	0	4	–	7	–	0
Western Carolina	2	–	4	–	0	4	–	7	–	0
East Tennessee State	2	–	5	–	0	5	–	6	–	0
The Citadel	1	–	5	–	0	4	–	7	–	0
$ – Conference champion; ^ – NCAA Division I-AA playoff participant; Rankings from NCAA Division I-AA Football Committee poll

The 1987 Western Carolina Catamounts team was an American football team that represented Western Carolina University as a member of the Southern Conference (SoCon) during the 1987 NCAA Division I-AA football season. In their 19th year under head coach Bob Waters, the team compiled an overall record of 4–7, with a mark of 2–4 in conference play, and finished tied for fifth in the SoCon.

== Schedule ==
Date	Opponent	Rank	Site	Result	Attendance	Source
September 12	at No. 9 (I-A) Clemson*		Memorial Stadium; Clemson, SC	L 0–43	71,465	
September 12	at South Carolina*		Williams–Brice Stadium; Columbia, SC	L 6–31	66,573	
September 19	No. 10 Furman		E. J. Whitmire Stadium; Cullowhee, NC	W 20–14	10,334	
September 26	at East Tennessee State		Memorial Center; Johnson City, TN	W 37–20	9,475	
October 10	Mars Hill*	No. 12	E. J. Whitmire Stadium; Cullowhee, NC	W 41–0	9,270	
October 17	North Carolina A&T*	No. 12	E. J. Whitmire Stadium; Cullowhee, NC	W 55–34	7,448	
October 24	No. 20 Georgia Southern*	No. 9	E. J. Whitmire Stadium; Cullowhee, NC	L 16–37	13,460	
October 31	at The Citadel	No. 18	Johnson Hagood Stadium; Charleston, SC	L 24–38	10,339	
November 7	Chattanooga		E. J. Whitmire Stadium; Cullowhee, NC	L 11–13	5,216	
November 14	at No. 20 Marshall		Fairfield Stadium; Huntington, WV	L 16–47	14,423	
November 21	No. 2 Appalachian State		E. J. Whitmire Stadium; Cullowhee, NC (rivalry)	L 13–33	11,154	
*Non-conference game; Rankings from NCAA Division I-AA Football Committee Poll released prior to the game
