= 1988 Chattanooga Moccasins football team =

American college football season

1988 Chattanooga Moccasins football
- Conference: Southern Conference
- Record: 4–7 (3–3 SoCon)
- Head coach: Buddy Nix (5th season)
- Captains: Tony Bowick; Travis McNeal
- Home stadium: Chamberlain Field

1988 Southern Conference football standings
| | Conf. | | | | | Overall |
| Team | W | | L | | T | W | | L | | T |
|---|---|---|---|---|---|---|---|---|---|---|
| No. 4 Furman +^ | 6 | – | 1 | – | 0 | 13 | – | 2 | – | 0 |
| No. 6 Marshall +^ | 6 | – | 1 | – | 0 | 11 | – | 2 | – | 0 |
| No. 14 The Citadel ^ | 5 | – | 2 | – | 0 | 8 | – | 4 | – | 0 |
| Appalachian State | 4 | – | 3 | – | 0 | 6 | – | 4 | – | 1 |
| Chattanooga | 3 | – | 3 | – | 0 | 4 | – | 7 | – | 0 |
| VMI | 1 | – | 5 | – | 0 | 2 | – | 9 | – | 0 |
| East Tennessee State | 1 | – | 6 | – | 0 | 3 | – | 8 | – | 0 |
| Western Carolina | 1 | – | 6 | – | 0 | 2 | – | 9 | – | 0 |
+ – Conference co-champions; ^ – NCAA Division I-AA playoff participant; Rankings from NCAA Division I-AA Football Committee poll

The 1988 Chattanooga Moccasins football team represented the University of Tennessee at Chattanooga as a member of the Southern Conference (SoCon) in the 1988 NCAA Division I-AA football season. The Moccasins were led by fifth-year head coach Buddy Nix and played their home games at Chamberlain Field. They finished the season 4–7, overall and 3–3 in SoCon play to place third.

== Schedule ==
| Date | Opponent | Site | Result | Attendance | Source |
|---|---|---|---|---|---|
| September 3 | at Tulane* | Louisiana Superdome; New Orleans, LA | L 19–33 | 21,777 | |
| September 10 | at Georgia Tech* | Bobby Dodd Stadium; Atlanta, GA | L 10–24 | 22,720 | |
| September 17 | No. 6 Georgia Southern* | Chamberlain Field; Chattanooga, TN | L 3–13 | 8,717 | |
| September 24 | at Tennessee Tech* | Tucker Stadium; Cookeville, TN | W 41–0 | 2,989 | |
| October 1 | East Tennessee State^{†} | Chamberlain Field; Chattanooga, TN | W 33–10 | 8,301 | |
| October 8 | Western Carolina | Chamberlain Field; Chattanooga, TN | W 19–14 | 6,008 | |
| October 15 | at The Citadel | Johnson Hagood Stadium; Charleston, SC | L 17–23 | 16,457 | |
| October 22 | at No. 3 Marshall | Fairfield Stadium; Huntington, WV | L 7–38 | 13,298 | |
| October 29 | at Western Kentucky* | L. T. Smith Stadium; Bowling Green, KY | L 29–31 | 18,200 | |
| November 5 | No. 10 Furman | Chamberlain Field; Chattanooga, TN | L 7–10 | 4,105 | |
| November 12 | No. 16 Appalachian State | Chamberlain Field; Chattanooga, TN | W 28–24 | 4,212 | |
*Non-conference game; ^{†}Homecoming; Rankings from NCAA Division I-AA Football Committee Poll released prior to the game
