= Appalachian State–Marshall football rivalry =

College football rivalry

The Old Mountain Feud
- Logo of The Old Mountain Feud

- Appalachian State Mountaineers Marshall Thundering Herd
- First meeting: October 1, 1977; Appalachian State, 28–20
- Latest meeting: November 14, 2026; Appalachian State, 20–16
- Next meeting: 2027

Statistics
- Total meetings: 29
- All-time series: Appalachian State leads, 18–11
- Largest victory: Marshall, 50–0 (1990)
- Longest win streak: Appalachian State, 4 (1977–1980)
- Current win streak: Appalachian State, 2 (2025–present)

Locations of Appalachian State and Marshall

The Appalachian State–Marshall football rivalry, known colloquially as The Old Mountain Feud, is a college rivalry between the Mountaineers of Appalachian State University in Boone, North Carolina, and the Thundering Herd of Marshall University in Huntington, West Virginia. The rivalry is significant for the competitiveness of the contests, as well as its place in contemporary Appalachian culture. Both campuses residing in the Appalachian Mountains, the two public universities both were once teacher's academies.

The football programs were dominant during their time in the Division I Football Championship Subdivision (FCS). From 1986 to 1996 the Southern Conference foes won at least a share of the conference title a combined eight times (Marshall ended the 1988 season tied with Furman for first). Nationally, the teams have combined for three Walter Payton Awards and five national championships. Marshall transitioned to the Football Bowl Subdivision (FBS) in 1997. Appalachian State moved to the FBS in 2014. Both programs continued to enjoy on-field success after their respective conference changes.

Appalachian State leads the all-time series, 18–11. The rivalry was played annually 1977–1996. The rivalry resumed annual play in the 2020 season and is an in-conference rivalry again as Marshall joined Appalachian State in the Sun Belt Conference East Division in 2022.

== History ==
Marshall's football program began in 1895 and the program at Appalachian State began in 1928. However, the Thundering Herd and Mountaineers did not meet until Marshall joined the Southern Conference in 1977. The teams were regularly in contention for Southern Conference titles, and in the offseason, the coaches would vie for the same regional recruits. In 1995, the fervor was so intense that the Marshall fans attacked the Appalachian State team bus on its way to Joan C. Edwards Stadium.

Marshall would leave the conference in 1996, rendering the rivalry dormant until 2020, save for one game in 2002. In that time, both football programs gained national recognition uncommon to many FCS and Group of Five teams. Appalachian State became the first FCS school to beat an AP top-5 program when they bested Michigan in 2007, and became the first college football program to win a bowl game in its first year of eligibility. Marshall's Randy Moss would have a Hall of Fame NFL career and the program was the subject of the 2006 feature film We Are Marshall, based on the aftermath of the Southern Airways Flight 932 tragedy.

Though many Marshall fans consider Appalachian State to be their top rival, most Appalachian State fans consider Marshall their secondary rival behind longtime adversary Georgia Southern. Still, the rivalry remains fierce among coaches, players, and fans. An altercation at Kidd Brewer Stadium in 2021 made national news after a group of Mountaineer supporters taunted some Marshall players on their way to the locker room after the game, and in response a Marshall player spat at the fans. The incident was caught on video and prompted a media dialogue about acceptable behavior between spectators and student-athletes.

== Game results ==
Appalachian State victories	Marshall victories	Tie games

No.	Date	Location	Winner	Score
1	October 1, 1977	Boone, NC	Appalachian State	28–20
2	September 16, 1978	Huntington, WV	Appalachian State	28–7
3	November 17, 1979	Boone, NC	Appalachian State	45–7
4	October 4, 1980	Huntington, WV	Appalachian State	23–6
5	November 7, 1981	Boone, NC	Marshall	17–10
6	October 8, 1982	Huntington, WV	Appalachian State	21–13
7	November 12, 1983	Boone, NC	Appalachian State	28–19
8	October 12, 1984	Huntington, WV	Marshall	35–7
9	November 16, 1985	Boone, NC	Appalachian State	40–0
10	November 8, 1986	Huntington, WV	Appalachian State	27–17
11	November 7, 1987	Boone, NC	Appalachian State	17–10
12	December 12, 1987	Boone, NC	Marshall	24–10
13	October 29, 1988	Huntington, WV	Marshall	30–27
14	November 4, 1989	Boone, NC	Appalachian State	28–7
15	November 3, 1990	Huntington, WV	Marshall	50–0

No.	Date	Location	Winner	Score
16	August 31, 1991	Boone, NC	Appalachian State	9–3
17	November 7, 1992	Huntington, WV	Appalachian State	37–34
18	October 23, 1993	Huntington, WV	Marshall	35–3
19	October 22, 1994	Boone, NC	Appalachian State	24–14
20	October 21, 1995	Huntington, WV	Appalachian State	10–3
21	October 26, 1996	Boone, NC	Marshall	24–10
22	August 31, 2002	Huntington, WV	No. 19 Marshall	50–17
23	September 19, 2020	Huntington, WV	Marshall	17–7
24	September 23, 2021	Boone, NC	Appalachian State	31–30
25	November 12, 2022	Huntington, WV	Marshall	28–21
26	November 4, 2023	Boone, NC	Appalachian State	31–9
27	October 5, 2024	Huntington, WV	Marshall	52–37
28	November 22, 2025	Boone, NC	Appalachian State	26–24
29	November 14, 2026	Huntington, WV	Appalachian State	20–16
Series: Appalachian State leads 18–11

== See also ==
- List of NCAA college football rivalry games
