= Alumni Memorial Field =

Stadium in Lexington, Virginia

Alumni Memorial Field at Foster Stadium
- Alumni Memorial Field
- Interactive map of Alumni Memorial Field at Foster Stadium
- Location: North Main Street; Lexington, Virginia 24450
- Coordinates: 37°47′20″N 79°26′6″W
- Owner: Virginia Military Institute
- Operator: Virginia Military Institute
- Capacity: 10,000
- Surface: Bermuda Grass

Construction
- Opened: 1962
- Renovated: 2006
- Cost: $250,000
- Architect: HOK Sport (renovations)

Tenants
- VMI Keydets football VMI Keydets track and field

Alumni Memorial Field at Foster Stadium is a 10,000-seat multi-purpose stadium in Lexington, Virginia, United States. It opened in 1962. It is home to the Virginia Military Institute Keydets football team.

== History ==
Alumni Memorial Field was built and completed in 1962. The cost was approximately $250,000, funded by the General Assembly of Virginia and VMI Alumni Association. Fiberglass seating was installed in 1974.

In 2006, many improvements were made to the stadium. A new scoreboard with a jumbotron was added, along with new concourses, restrooms, and locker rooms. It totaled a cost of $15 million.

== Features ==
After renovation to the stadium in 2006, Alumni Memorial Stadium features permanent ticket booths, new concourses, restrooms, and locker rooms. It has a capacity of 10,000, with 54 rows at 173 feet (53 m) high. The playing surface is Bermuda Grass.

== Tradition ==
Before every VMI home game, the VMI Corps of Cadets marches from their barracks onto the field while the VMI Regimental Band plays "Shenandoah", along with a cannon called "Little John" firing at the start and end of the game and after every VMI score.

== Record crowds ==
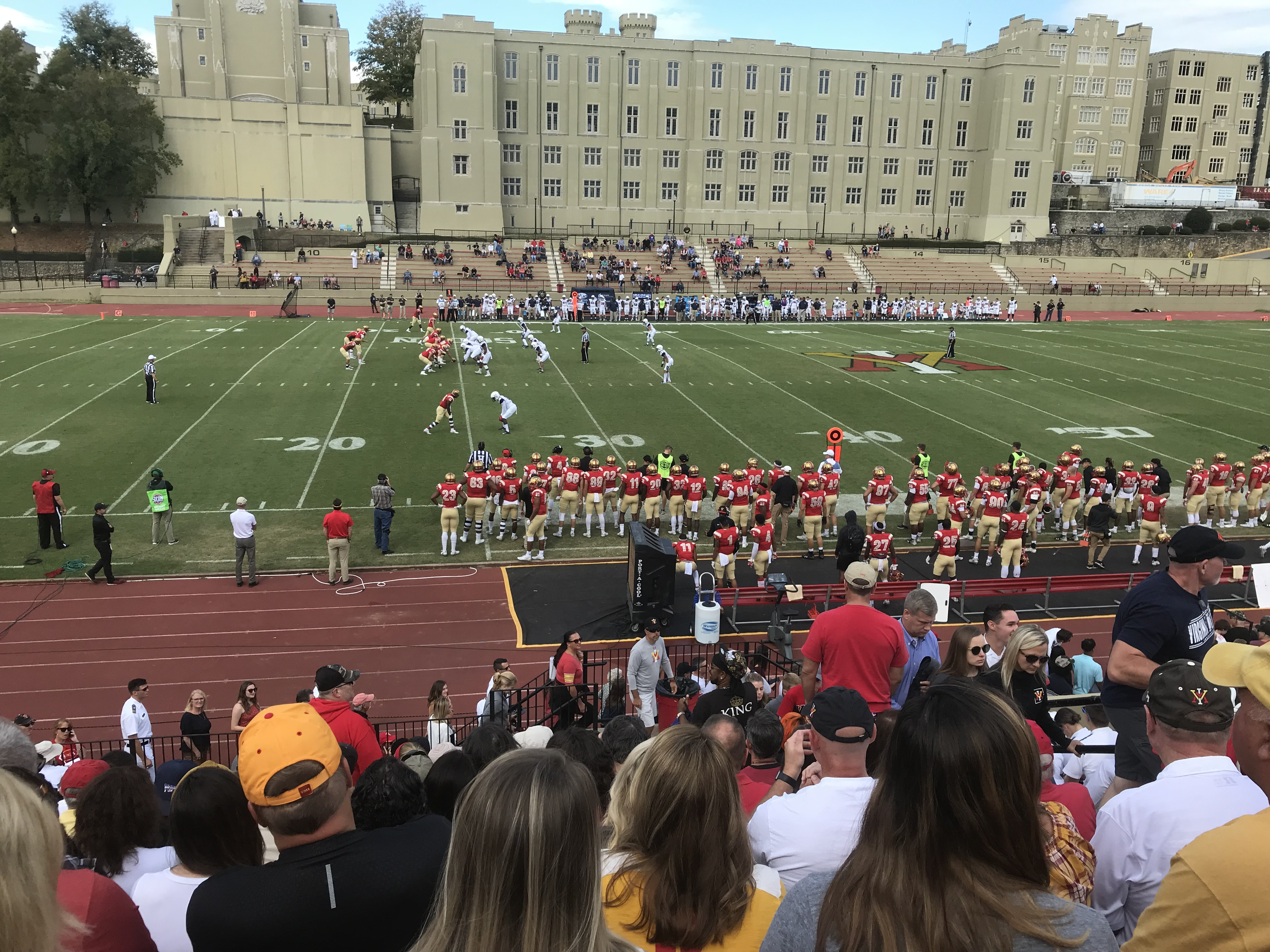
Alumni Memorial Field at Foster Stadium during a game between VMI and Samford in October 2019

On September 15, 1973, VMI fell to Navy 37–8 in the largest crowd in Alumni Memorial Field history, with an attendance of 10,000. Just three years earlier on October 31, 1970, before 2,400 spectators, VMI fell heavily to Davidson 55–21 in the smallest crowd in Alumni Memorial Field history.

== See also ==
- List of NCAA Division I FCS football stadiums
