= Paladin Stadium =

Football stadium in Greenville, South Carolina

Coordinates: 34°55′13″N 82°26′14″W

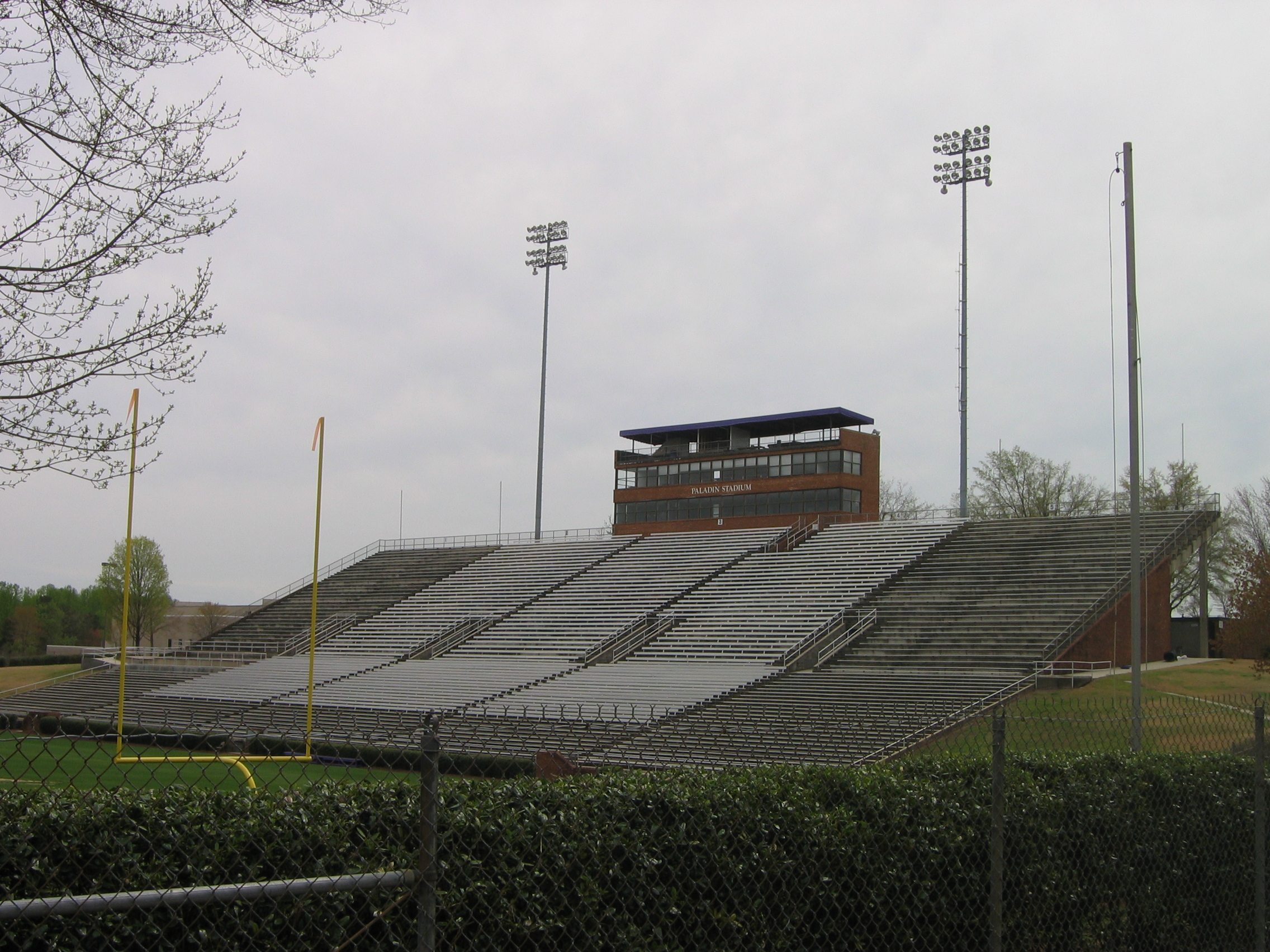
- Interactive map of Paladin Stadium
- Location: 1300 Duncan Chapel Road; Greenville, South Carolina 29613
- Owner: Furman University
- Operator: Furman University
- Capacity: 16,000
- Surface: shawturf

Construction
- Groundbreaking: 1980
- Opened: September 19, 1981
- Expanded: 1985
- Cost: $2 million ($7.08 million in 2025 dollars)
- Architects: Chapman, McMillan & Satterfield
- General contractor: Farley Construction

Tenants
- Furman Paladins; Greenville Triumph (USL1) (2023–2026); Greenville Liberty (USLW) (2023–present)

Paladin Stadium is a 16,000-seat stadium located near Greenville, South Carolina, US. It was built in 1981 at a cost of $2 million, and originally seated 13,200 fans. It was expanded to its current capacity in 1985, and is currently home to the Furman Paladins football team. The stadium was converted to field turf before the 2013 season.

In addition to football, Paladin Stadium is also used for lacrosse, graduation ceremonies and concerts.

On January 9, 2023, the Greenville Triumph and Greenville Liberty soccer teams announced Paladin Stadium as their homes for the 2023 USL League One and USL W League seasons.

== Gallery ==
Media related to Paladin Stadium at Wikimedia Commons

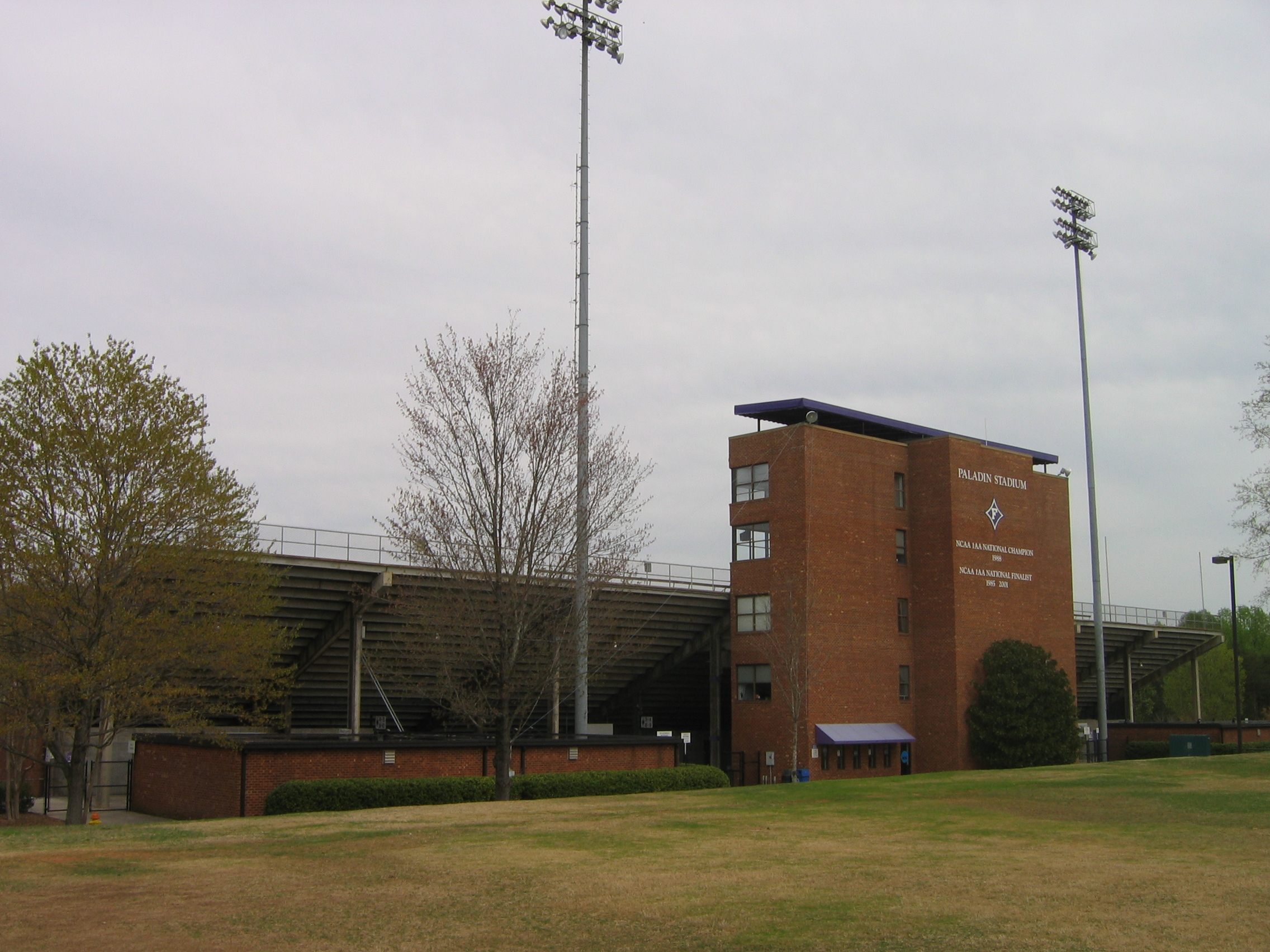
Main Gate

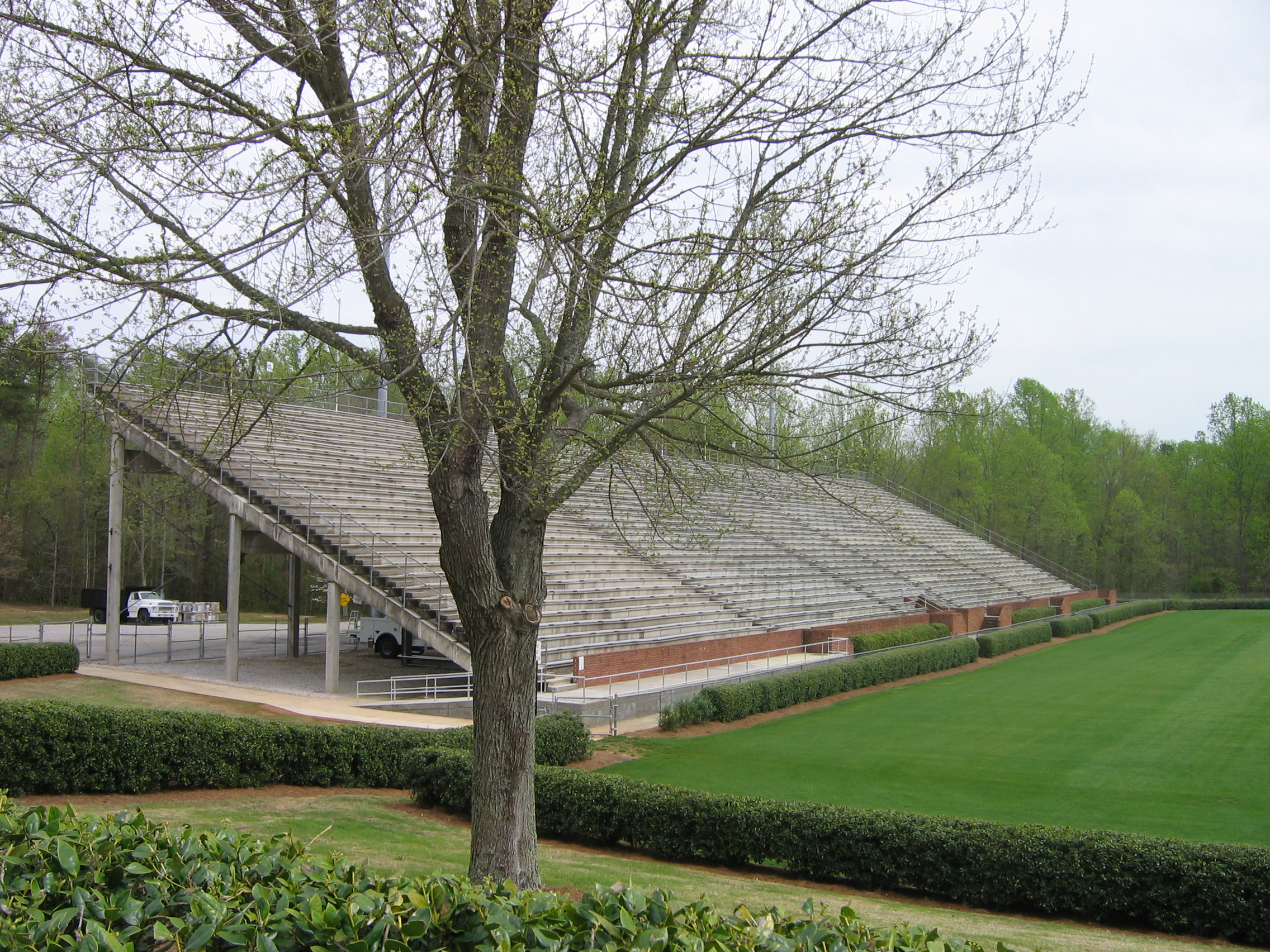
Visitor Stands

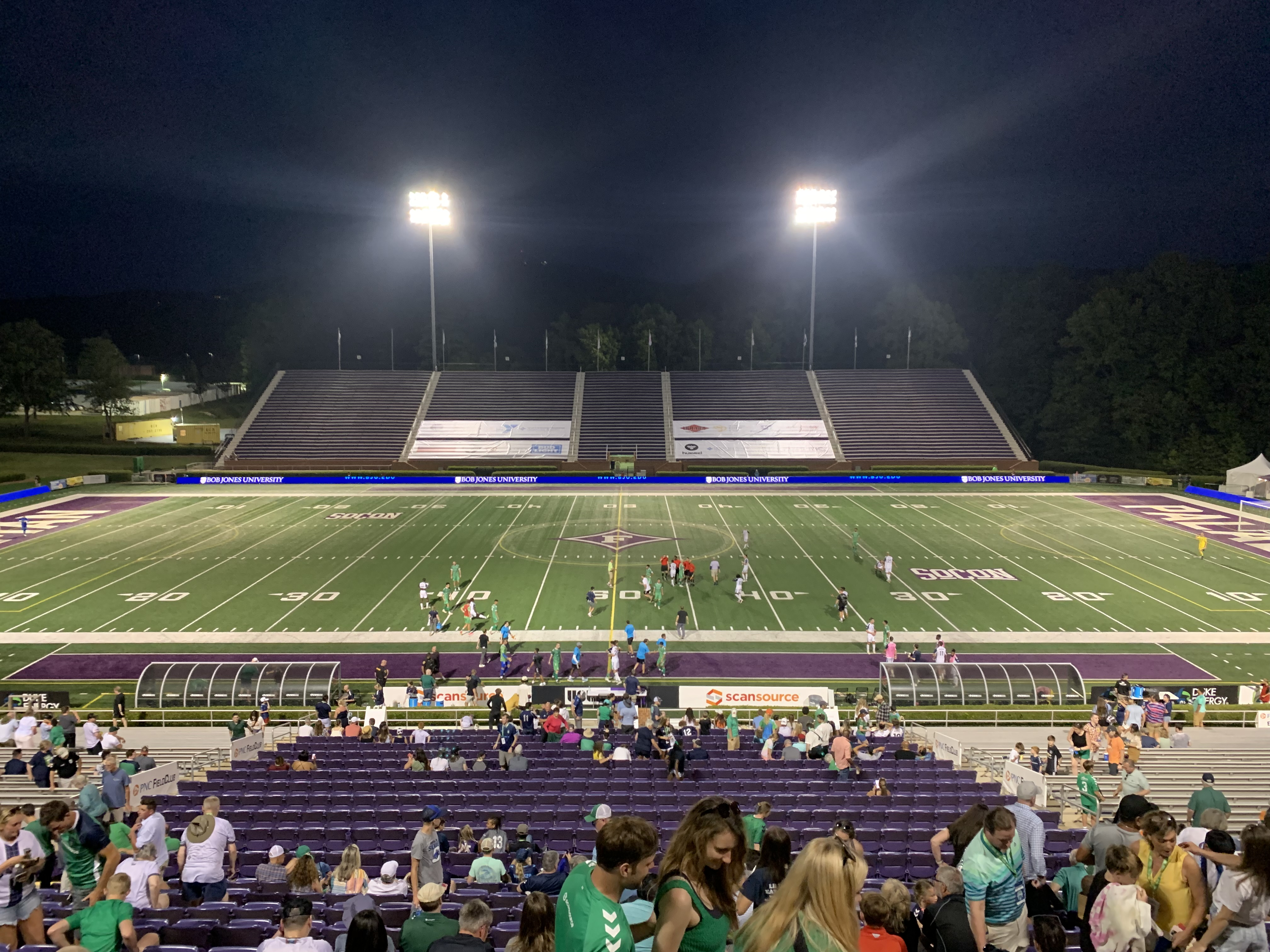
During a Greenville Triumph SC match in 2023

== See also ==
- List of NCAA Division I FCS football stadiums
