= 1987 Louisiana Tech Bulldogs football team =

American college football season

1987 Louisiana Tech Bulldogs football
- Conference: Independent
- Record: 3–8
- Head coach: Carl Torbush (1st season)
- Offensive coordinator: Jim Marshall (1st season)
- Captains: David O'Neal; Mike Turner
- Home stadium: Joe Aillet Stadium

1987 NCAA Division I-AA independents football standings
| | Conf. | | | Overall |
| Team | W | L | T | W | | L | | T |
|---|---|---|---|---|---|---|---|---|
| No. 6 Georgia Southern ^ | | – | | 9 | – | 4 | – | 0 |
| No. 8 James Madison ^ | | – | | 9 | – | 3 | – | 0 |
| No. 12 Arkansas State ^ | | – | | 8 | – | 4 | – | 1 |
| No. 11 Western Kentucky ^ | | – | | 7 | – | 4 | – | 0 |
| Villanova | | – | | 6 | – | 4 | – | 0 |
| Northeastern | | – | | 6 | – | 5 | – | 0 |
| Nicholls State | | – | | 5 | – | 5 | – | 1 |
| Florida A&M | | – | | 5 | – | 5 | – | 1 |
| William & Mary | | – | | 5 | – | 6 | – | 0 |
| Towson State | | – | | 4 | – | 6 | – | 0 |
| Tennessee State | | – | | 3 | – | 7 | – | 1 |
| Lamar | | – | | 3 | – | 8 | – | 0 |
| Louisiana Tech | | – | | 3 | – | 8 | – | 0 |
^ – NCAA Division I-AA playoff participant; Rankings from NCAA Division I-AA Football Committee poll

The 1987 Louisiana Tech Bulldogs football team was an American football team that represented Louisiana Tech University as an I-AA independent during the 1987 NCAA Division I-AA football season. In their first year under head coach Carl Torbush, the team compiled a 3–8 record.

== Schedule ==
| Date | Time | Opponent | Site | Result | Attendance | Source |
|---|---|---|---|---|---|---|
| September 5 | | at Baylor | Baylor Stadium; Waco, TX | L 3–13 | 22,535 | |
| September 12 | 7:00 p.m. | Northeast Louisiana | Joe Aillet Stadium; Ruston, LA (rivalry) | L 7–44 | 24,975 | |
| September 19 | | at Mississippi State | Scott Field; Starkville, MS | L 13–14 | 23,200 | |
| September 26 | | at Kansas | Memorial Stadium; Lawrence, KS | W 16–11 | 23,000 | |
| October 3 | | at Chattanooga | Chamberlain Field; Chattanooga, TN | L 18–20 | 8,450 | |
| October 10 | 1:30 p.m. | McNeese State | Joe Aillet Stadium; Ruston, LA | W 7–3 | 16,300 | |
| October 17 | | at Arkansas State | Indian Stadium; Jonesboro, AR | L 3–37 | 17,311 | |
| October 24 | | vs. Northwestern State | Independence Stadium; Shreveport, LA (rivalry) | W 23–0 | 15,232 | |
| October 31 | | at Texas A&M | Kyle Field; College Station, TX | L 3–32 | 53,779 | |
| November 14 | | Southwest Missouri State | Joe Aillet Stadium; Ruston, LA | L 10–13 | 13,780 | |
| November 21 | | at North Texas State | Fouts Field; Denton, TX | L 5–10 | 8,125 | |
All times are in Central time

== Roster ==
1987 Louisiana Tech Bulldogs football team roster
| Players | | | Coaches |
|---|---|---|---|
| Offense: Pos. / # / Name / Class | Defense: Pos. / # / Name / Class | Special teams: Pos. / # / Name / Class; K / 1 / Matt Stover / So | Head coach: Carl Torbush; Coordinators/assistant coaches: Norman Joseph (PCG/RC); Legend: (C) Team captain; (S) Suspended; (I) Ineligible; Injured; Redshirt |
