= 1987 Grambling State Tigers football team =

American college football season

1987 Grambling State Tigers football
- Conference: Southwestern Athletic Conference
- Record: 5–6 (3–4 SWAC)
- Head coach: Eddie Robinson (45th season)
- Home stadium: Eddie Robinson Stadium

1987 Southwestern Athletic Conference football standings
	Conf.					Overall
Team	W		L		T	W		L		T
No. 9 Jackson State $^	7	–	0	–	0	8	–	3	–	1
Southern	5	–	2	–	0	7	–	4	–	0
Alcorn State	5	–	2	–	0	6	–	3	–	0
Alabama State	4	–	3	–	0	8	–	3	–	0
Grambling State	3	–	4	–	0	5	–	6	–	0
Texas Southern	3	–	4	–	0	5	–	6	–	0
Prairie View A&M	1	–	6	–	0	3	–	8	–	0
Mississippi Valley State	0	–	7	–	0	1	–	10	–	0
$ – Conference champion; ^ – NCAA Division I-AA playoff participant; Rankings from NCAA Division I-AA Football Committee poll

The 1987 Grambling State Tigers football team represented Grambling State University as a member of the Southwestern Athletic Conference (SWAC) during the 1987 NCAA Division I-AA football season. The Tigers were led by head coach Eddie Robinson in his 45th year and finished the season with a record of five wins and six losses (5–6, 3–4 SWAC). The Tigers offense scored 278 points while the defense allowed 208 points. The season saw the Tigers lose to Central State in the Whitney M. Young Urban League Classic at Yankee Stadium 37–21. The game was the final football game played at "Old" Yankee Stadium. The Tigers failed to get their first winning season since 1959.

== Schedule ==
Date	Opponent	Site	Result	Attendance	Source
September 5	vs. Alcorn State	Independence Stadium; Shreveport. LA (Red River Classic)	L 24–28	22,745	
September 12	vs. Central State (OH)*	Yankee Stadium; Bronx, NY (Whitney Young Memorial Classic)	L 21–37	29,411	
September 26	Bethune–Cookman*	Eddie G. Robinson Memorial Stadium; Grambling, LA	W 21–14		
October 3	vs. Prairie View A&M	Cotton Bowl; Dallas, TX (rivalry)	W 28–7	35,752	
October 10	at Tennessee State*	Vanderbilt Stadium; Nashville, TN	W 51–9	38,000	
October 17	Mississippi Valley State	Eddie G. Robinson Memorial Stadium; Grambling, LA	W 45–14		
October 24	at Jackson State	Mississippi Veterans Memorial Stadium; Jackson, MS	L 17–31	39,000	
October 31	Texas Southern	Eddie G. Robinson Memorial Stadium; Grambling, LA	W 30–9		
November 7	at Alabama State	Cramton Bowl; Montgomery, AL	L 7–17		
November 12	South Carolina State*	Eddie G. Robinson Memorial Stadium; Grambling, LA	L 13–15		
November 28	vs. Southern	Louisiana Superdome; New Orleans, LA (Bayou Classic)	L 21–27		
*Non-conference game

== Team players in the NFL ==
Player	Round	Pick	Position	NFL club
Curtis Maxey	8	195	Defensive Tackle	Cincinnati Bengals
Johnny Carter	12	332	Defensive Tackle	Denver Broncos
