= 1987 Alabama State Hornets football team =

American college football season

1987 Alabama State Hornets football
- Conference: Southwestern Athletic Conference
- Record: 8–3 (4–3 SWAC)
- Head coach: Houston Markham (1st season)
- Offensive coordinator: Darwin Valentine (1st season)
- Home stadium: Cramton Bowl

1987 Southwestern Athletic Conference football standings
	Conf.					Overall
Team	W		L		T	W		L		T
No. 9 Jackson State $^	7	–	0	–	0	8	–	3	–	1
Southern	5	–	2	–	0	7	–	4	–	0
Alcorn State	5	–	2	–	0	6	–	3	–	0
Alabama State	4	–	3	–	0	8	–	3	–	0
Grambling State	3	–	4	–	0	5	–	6	–	0
Texas Southern	3	–	4	–	0	5	–	6	–	0
Prairie View A&M	1	–	6	–	0	3	–	8	–	0
Mississippi Valley State	0	–	7	–	0	1	–	10	–	0
$ – Conference champion; ^ – NCAA Division I-AA playoff participant; Rankings from NCAA Division I-AA Football Committee poll

The 1987 Alabama State Hornets football team represented Alabama State University as a member of the Southwestern Athletic Conference (SWAC) during the 1987 NCAA Division I-AA football season. Led by first-year head coach Houston Markham, the Hornets compiled an overall record of 8–3, with a mark of 4–3 in conference play, and finished fourth in the SWAC.

== Schedule ==
Date	Opponent	Site	Result	Attendance	Source
September 12	vs. Southern	Ladd Stadium; Mobile, AL (Gulf Coast Classic)	L 10–14	15,000	
September 19	Alcorn State	Cramton Bowl; Montgomery, AL	W 17–9		
September 26	at Texas Southern	Robertson Stadium; Houston, TX	L 9–31		
October 3	at Florida A&M*	Bragg Memorial Stadium; Tallahassee, FL	W 14–12	6,395	
October 10	at Jackson State	Mississippi Veterans Memorial Stadium; Jackson, MS	L 17–41	33,500	
October 17	Albany State*	Cramton Bowl; Montgomery, AL	W 21–20		
October 24	Prairie View A&M	Cramton Bowl; Montgomery, AL	W 24–7		
October 31	vs. Alabama A&M*	Legion Field; Birmingham, AL (Magic City Classic)	W 17–14		
November 7	Grambling State	Cramton Bowl; Montgomery, AL	W 17–7		
November 14	Mississippi Valley State	Cramton Bowl; Montgomery, AL	W 21–0	8,500	
November 26	Johnson C. Smith*	Cramton Bowl; Montgomery, AL (Turkey Day Classic)	W 21–3	14,000	
*Non-conference game
