= 1987 Rhode Island Rams football team =

American college football season

1987 Rhode Island Rams football
- Conference: Yankee Conference
- Record: 1–10 (1–6 Yankee)
- Head coach: Bob Griffin (12th season)
- Home stadium: Meade Stadium

1987 Yankee Conference football standings
	Conf.					Overall
Team	W		L		T	W		L		T
No. 13 Maine +^	6	–	1	–	0	8	–	4	–	0
No. 17 Richmond +^	6	–	1	–	0	7	–	5	–	0
Connecticut	5	–	2	–	0	7	–	4	–	0
New Hampshire	4	–	3	–	0	7	–	3	–	0
Delaware	2	–	5	–	0	5	–	6	–	0
UMass	2	–	5	–	0	3	–	8	–	0
Boston University	2	–	5	–	0	3	–	8	–	0
Rhode Island	1	–	6	–	0	1	–	10	–	0
+ – Conference co-champions; ^ – NCAA Division I-AA playoff participant; Rankings from NCAA Division I-AA Football Committee poll

The 1987 Rhode Island Rams football team was an American football team that represented the University of Rhode Island in the Yankee Conference during the 1987 NCAA Division I-AA football season. In their 12th season under head coach Bob Griffin, the Rams compiled a 1–10 record (1–6 against conference opponents) and finished last out of eight teams in the conference.

== Schedule ==
Date	Opponent	Site	Result	Attendance	Source
September 5	at James Madison*	JMU Stadium; Harrisonburg, VA	L 0–38	3,300	
September 12	Delaware	Meade Stadium; Kingston, RI	W 26–13	7,028	
September 19	No. 6 Maine	Meade Stadium; Kingston, RI	L 20–24	6,858	
September 26	at Brown*	Brown Stadium; Providence, RI (rivalry)	L 15–17	13,500	
October 3	at UMass	McGuirk Stadium; Hadley, MA	L 7–42	9,801	
October 17	at Boston University	Nickerson Field; Boston, MA	L 13–16	11,552	
October 24	at No. 19 Richmond	University of Richmond Stadium; Richmond, VA	L 14–27	17,029	
October 31	No. 6 New Hampshire^{†}	Meade Stadium; Kingston, RI	L 14–28	11,231	
November 7	Northeastern*	Meade Stadium; Kingston, RI	L 3–21	6,994	
November 14	Connecticut	Meade Stadium; Kingston, RI (rivalry)	L 7–52	3,906	
November 21	at Towson State*	Minnegan Stadium; Towson, MD	L 16–19	587	
*Non-conference game; ^{†}Homecoming; Rankings from NCAA Division I-AA Football Committee Poll released prior to the game
