= Laconia High School =

Laconia High School is the name of some high schools in the United States:

- Laconia High School (New Hampshire)
- Laconia High School (Wisconsin), a high school in Wisconsin
