= 1987 Western Kentucky Hilltoppers football team =

American college football season

1987 Western Kentucky Hilltoppers football

NCAA Division I-AA First Round, L 17–40 at Eastern Kentucky
- Conference: Independent
- Record: 7–4
- Head coach: Dave Roberts (4th season)
- Home stadium: L. T. Smith Stadium

1987 NCAA Division I-AA independents football standings
	Conf.			Overall
Team	W	L	T	W		L		T
No. 6 Georgia Southern ^		–		9	–	4	–	0
No. 8 James Madison ^		–		9	–	3	–	0
No. 12 Arkansas State ^		–		8	–	4	–	1
No. 11 Western Kentucky ^		–		7	–	4	–	0
Villanova		–		6	–	4	–	0
Northeastern		–		6	–	5	–	0
Nicholls State		–		5	–	5	–	1
Florida A&M		–		5	–	5	–	1
William & Mary		–		5	–	6	–	0
Towson State		–		4	–	6	–	0
Tennessee State		–		3	–	7	–	1
Lamar		–		3	–	8	–	0
Louisiana Tech		–		3	–	8	–	0
^ – NCAA Division I-AA playoff participant; Rankings from NCAA Division I-AA Football Committee poll

The 1987 Western Kentucky Hilltoppers football team represented Western Kentucky University as an independent during the 1987 NCAA Division I-AA football season. Led by fourth-year head coach Dave Roberts, the Hilltoppers compiled a 7–4. The team earned the school's first NCAA Division I-AA Football Championship playoff berth; their previous playoff appearances had been at the NCAA Division II level. Western Kentucky played their home games at L. T. Smith Stadium in Bowling Green, Kentucky. Lights were installed prior to the season, and Western Kentucky hosted their first night game on September 19, a victory over rival Murray State. The Hilltoppers finished the season ranked No. 11 in final NCAA Division I-AA Football Committee poll. Western Kentucky's roster included future National Football League (NFL) players Tony Brown, Malcolm Darden, James Edwards, Glenn Holt, David Smith, Steve Walsh, Harold Wright, Xavier Jordan, and Dean Tiebout. Edwards, Walsh, and Dewayne Penn were named to the AP All American team.

== Schedule ==
Date	Opponent	Rank	Site	Result	Attendance	Source
September 5	Gardner–Webb		L. T. Smith Stadium; Bowling Green, KY	L 24–28	5,500	
September 19	No. 3 Murray State		L. T. Smith Stadium; Bowling Green, KY (Battle for the Red Belt)	W 21–17	19,250	
September 26	No. 12 Middle Tennessee		L. T. Smith Stadium; Bowling Green, KY	W 28–16	16,500	
October 3	at No. 12 Eastern Kentucky		Hanger Field; Richmond, KY (Battle of the Bluegrass)	L 10–20	20,200	
October 10	at No. 12 Chattanooga		Chamberlain Field; Chattanooga, TN	W 20–17	8,377	
October 17	Livingston^{†}	No. 14	L. T. Smith Stadium; Bowling Green, KY	W 21–14	14,000	
October 24	at Austin Peay	No. 11	Municipal Stadium; Clarksville, TN	W 27–0	5,833	
October 31	at No. 14 Georgia Southern	No. 8	Paulson Stadium; Statesboro, GA	L 20–23	13,066	
November 14	Eastern Illinois	No. 14	L. T. Smith Stadium; Bowling Green, KY	W 30–15	8,000	
November 21	at North Carolina A&T	No. 12	Aggie Stadium; Greensboro, NC	W 45–27	2,500	
November 28	at No. 7 Eastern Kentucky	No. 11	Hanger Field; Richmond, KY (NCAA Division I-AA First Round)	L 17–40	4,050	
^{†}Homecoming; Rankings from NCAA Division I-AA Football Committee Poll released prior to the game
