= 1987 Lamar Cardinals football team =

American college football season

1987 Lamar Cardinals football
- Conference: Independent
- Record: 3–8
- Head coach: Ray Alborn (2nd season)
- Home stadium: Cardinal Stadium

1987 NCAA Division I-AA independents football standings
	Conf.			Overall
Team	W	L	T	W		L		T
No. 6 Georgia Southern ^		–		9	–	4	–	0
No. 8 James Madison ^		–		9	–	3	–	0
No. 12 Arkansas State ^		–		8	–	4	–	1
No. 11 Western Kentucky ^		–		7	–	4	–	0
Villanova		–		6	–	4	–	0
Northeastern		–		6	–	5	–	0
Nicholls State		–		5	–	5	–	1
William & Mary		–		5	–	6	–	0
Towson State		–		4	–	6	–	0
Tennessee State		–		3	–	7	–	1
Lamar		–		3	–	8	–	0
Louisiana Tech		–		3	–	8	–	0
^ – NCAA Division I-AA playoff participant; Rankings from NCAA Division I-AA Football Committee poll

The 1987 Lamar Cardinals football team represented Lamar University in the 1987 NCAA Division I-AA football season as an NCAA Division I-AA independent. The Cardinals played their home games at Cardinal Stadium now named Provost Umphrey Stadium in Beaumont, Texas. Lamar finished the 1987 season with a 3–8 overall record. The season marked the first year competing as an independent. Lamar left the Southland Conference to join the non–football American South Conference as a charter member along with fellow former SLC members, Louisiana Tech and Arkansas State and three other universities.

== Schedule ==
Date	Opponent	Site	Result	Attendance	Source
September 5	at Rice	Rice Stadium; Houston, TX	L 30–34	12,500	
September 12	at Northern Illinois	Huskie Stadium; DeKalb, IL	W 39–35	22,184	
September 19	at Texas Tech	Jones Stadium; Lubbock, TX	L 14–43	27,795	
September 26	Stephen F. Austin	Cardinal Stadium; Beaumont, TX	W 28–26		
October 3	at No. T–3 (D-II) Texas A&I	Javelina Stadium; Kingsville, TX	L 14–43		
October 10	No. 2 Northeast Louisiana	Cardinal Stadium; Beaumont, TX	W 48–28		
October 17	at UTEP	Sun Bowl; El Paso, TX	L 14–38	49,481	
October 24	Sam Houston State	Cardinal Stadium; Beaumont, TX	L 21–34	7,014	
October 31	Southwest Texas State	Bobcat Stadium; San Marcos, TX	L 19–27	9,160	
November 14	No. 10 Arkansas State	Cardinal Stadium; Beaumont, TX	L 20–34		
November 21	at McNeese State	Cardinal Stadium; Beaumont, TX (rivalry)	L 36–44	3,259	
Rankings from AP Poll released prior to the game
