= 1987 Tennessee State Tigers football team =

American college football season

1987 Tennessee State Tigers football
- Conference: Independent
- Record: 3–7–1
- Head coach: William A. Thomas (4th season)
- Home stadium: Hale Stadium; Vanderbilt Stadium

1987 NCAA Division I-AA independents football standings
	Conf.			Overall
Team	W	L	T	W		L		T
No. 6 Georgia Southern ^		–		9	–	4	–	0
No. 8 James Madison ^		–		9	–	3	–	0
No. 12 Arkansas State ^		–		8	–	4	–	1
No. 11 Western Kentucky ^		–		7	–	4	–	0
Villanova		–		6	–	4	–	0
Northeastern		–		6	–	5	–	0
Nicholls State		–		5	–	5	–	1
William & Mary		–		5	–	6	–	0
Towson State		–		4	–	6	–	0
Tennessee State		–		3	–	7	–	1
Lamar		–		3	–	8	–	0
Louisiana Tech		–		3	–	8	–	0
^ – NCAA Division I-AA playoff participant; Rankings from NCAA Division I-AA Football Committee poll

The 1987 Tennessee State Tigers football team represented Tennessee State University as an independent during the 1987 NCAA Division I-AA football season. Led by fourth-year head coach William A. Thomas, the Tigers compiled an overall record of 3–7–1.

== Schedule ==
Date	Opponent	Site	Result	Attendance	Source
September 5	Middle Tennessee	Vanderbilt Stadium; Nashville, TN	L 19–55	30,827	
September 12	vs. No. 11 Jackson State	Liberty Bowl Memorial Stadium; Memphis, TN (Southern Heritage Classic)	T 17–17	26,853	
September 26	at Florida A&M	Bragg Memorial Stadium; Tallahassee, FL	W 21–16	16,246	
October 3	vs. Central State (OH)	Hoosier Dome; Indianapolis, IN (Circle City Classic)	L 28–31	47,415	
October 10	Grambling State	Vanderbilt Stadium; Nashville, TN	L 9–51	38,000	
October 17	at Morris Brown	Herndon Stadium; Atlanta, GA	W 17–7	10,049	
October 24	Morgan State	Hale Stadium; Nashville, TN	W 37–17	3,500	
October 31	at Southern	A. W. Mumford Stadium; Baton Rouge, LA	L 7–14	16,000	
November 7	Bethune–Cookman	Hale Stadium; Nashville, TN	L 13–16	2,700	
November 14	Texas Southern	Hale Stadium; Nashville, TN	L 21–30	3,900	
November 21	at Alabama A&M	Milton Frank Stadium; Huntsville, AL	L 9–27		
Rankings from NCAA Division I-AA Football Committee Poll released prior to the game
