= 1987 Bethune–Cookman Wildcats football team =

American college football season

1987 Bethune–Cookman Wildcats football
- Conference: Mid-Eastern Athletic Conference
- Record: 5–6 (3–2 MEAC)
- Head coach: Larry Little (5th season)
- Home stadium: Memorial Stadium

1987 Mid-Eastern Athletic Conference football standings
	Conf.					Overall
Team	W		L		T	W		L		T
No. 20 Delaware State $	5	–	0	–	0	9	–	1	–	0
No. 18 Howard	4	–	1	–	0	8	–	2	–	0
South Carolina State	3	–	2	–	0	6	–	5	–	0
Bethune–Cookman	2	–	3	–	0	4	–	7	–	0
North Carolina A&T	1	–	4	–	0	3	–	8	–	0
Morgan State	0	–	5	–	0	1	–	9	–	0
Florida A&M	0	–	0	–	0	5	–	5	–	1
$ – Conference champion; Florida A&M games did not count as conference games in 1987; records adjusted for Howard and Arkansas Pine–Bluff forfeits to Delaware State; Rankings from NCAA Division I-AA Football Committee poll

The 1987 Bethune–Cookman Wildcats football team represented Bethune–Cookman College (now known as Bethune–Cookman University) as a member of the Mid-Eastern Athletic Conference (MEAC) during the 1987 NCAA Division I-AA football season. Led by fifth-year head coach Larry Little, the Wildcats compiled an overall record of 5–6, with a mark of 3–2 in conference play, and finished third in the MEAC.

== Schedule ==
Date	Opponent	Site	Result	Attendance	Source
September 5	at No. 10 (D-II) UCF*	Florida Citrus Bowl; Orlando, FL	L 9–17	9,768	
September 12	at Morgan State	Hughes Stadium; Baltimore, MD	W 34–22	3,400	
September 19	Howard	Daytona Stadium; Daytona Beach, FL	W 51–58 (forfeit win)	5,300	
September 26	at Grambling State*	Eddie G. Robinson Memorial Stadium; Grambling, LA	L 14–21		
October 3	at Delaware State	Alumni Stadium; Dover, DE	L 0–45		
October 10	vs. No. T–7 Georgia Southern*	Gator Bowl Stadium; Jacksonville, FL	L 13–14	5,100	
October 17	at South Carolina State	Oliver C. Dawson Stadium; Orangeburg, SC	L 20–41	18,507	
October 31	North Carolina A&T	Daytona Stadium; Daytona Beach, FL	W 38–36		
November 7	at Tennessee State*	Hale Stadium; Nashville, TN	W 16–13	2,700	
November 13	at Morris Brown*	Herndon Stadium; Atlanta, GA	W 34–12		
November 28	vs. Florida A&M*	Tampa Stadium; Tampa, FL (rivalry)	L 10–21	41,521	
*Non-conference game; Rankings from NCAA Division I-AA Football Committee Poll released prior to the game
