= 1987 Alcorn State Braves football team =

American college football season

1987 Alcorn State Braves football
- Conference: Southwestern Athletic Conference
- Record: 6–3 (5–2 SWAC)
- Head coach: Theophilus Danzy (2nd season)
- Home stadium: Henderson Stadium

1987 Southwestern Athletic Conference football standings
	Conf.					Overall
Team	W		L		T	W		L		T
No. 9 Jackson State $^	7	–	0	–	0	8	–	3	–	1
Southern	5	–	2	–	0	7	–	4	–	0
Alcorn State	5	–	2	–	0	6	–	3	–	0
Alabama State	4	–	3	–	0	8	–	3	–	0
Grambling State	3	–	4	–	0	5	–	6	–	0
Texas Southern	3	–	4	–	0	5	–	6	–	0
Prairie View A&M	1	–	6	–	0	3	–	8	–	0
Mississippi Valley State	0	–	7	–	0	1	–	10	–	0
$ – Conference champion; ^ – NCAA Division I-AA playoff participant; Rankings from NCAA Division I-AA Football Committee poll

The 1987 Alcorn State Braves football team represented Alcorn State University as a member of the Southwestern Athletic Conference (SWAC) during the 1987 NCAA Division I-AA football season. Led by second-year head coach Theophilus Danzy, the Braves compiled an overall record of 6–3, with a conference record of 5–2, and finished tied for second in the SWAC.

== Schedule ==
Date	Opponent	Site	Result	Attendance	Source
September 5	vs. Grambling State	Independence Stadium; Shreveport. LA (Red River Classic)	W 28–24	22,745	
September 19	at Alabama State	Cramton Bowl; Montgomery, AL	L 9–17		
October 3	at Nicholls State*	John L. Guidry Stadium; Thibodaux, LA	L 3–14		
October 10	at Texas Southern	Rice Stadium; Houston, TX	W 24–21		
October 24	at Southern	A. W. Mumford Stadium; Baton Rouge, LA	W 19–17		
October 31	Florida A&M*	Henderson Stadium; Lorman, MS	W 17–15		
November 7	Mississippi Valley State	Henderson Stadium; Lorman, MS	W 21–13		
November 16	Prairie View A&M	Henderson Stadium; Lorman, MS	W 20–19		
November 21	at No. 10 Jackson State	Mississippi Veterans Memorial Stadium; Jackson, MS (rivalry)	L 10–19		
*Non-conference game; Rankings from NCAA Division I-AA Football Committee Poll released prior to the game
