= 1987 Northeastern Huskies football team =

American college football season

1987 Northeastern Huskies football
- Conference: Independent
- Record: 6–5
- Head coach: Paul Pawlak (7th season)
- Home stadium: Parsons Field

1987 NCAA Division I-AA independents football standings
	Conf.			Overall
Team	W	L	T	W		L		T
No. 6 Georgia Southern ^		–		9	–	4	–	0
No. 8 James Madison ^		–		9	–	3	–	0
No. 12 Arkansas State ^		–		8	–	4	–	1
No. 11 Western Kentucky ^		–		7	–	4	–	0
Villanova		–		6	–	4	–	0
Northeastern		–		6	–	5	–	0
Nicholls State		–		5	–	5	–	1
William & Mary		–		5	–	6	–	0
Towson State		–		4	–	6	–	0
Tennessee State		–		3	–	7	–	1
Lamar		–		3	–	8	–	0
Louisiana Tech		–		3	–	8	–	0
^ – NCAA Division I-AA playoff participant; Rankings from NCAA Division I-AA Football Committee poll

The 1987 Northeastern Huskies football team was an American football team that represented Northeastern University as an independent during the 1987 NCAA Division I-AA football season. Led by seventh-year head coach Paul Pawlak, the team compiled a 6–5 record.

== Schedule ==
Date	Opponent	Site	Result	Attendance	Source
September 12	Towson State	Parsons Field; Brookline, MA	W 39–22	1,350	
September 19	at Connecticut	Memorial Stadium; Storrs, CT	W 20–12	7,728	
September 26	at Harvard	Harvard Stadium; Boston, MA	L 24–27	15,900	
October 3	at Youngstown State	Stambaugh Stadium; Youngstown, OH	L 14–29		
October 10	No. T–16 Maine	Parsons Field; Brookline, MA	W 21–17	5,100	
October 17	at No. 10 New Hampshire	Cowell Stadium; Durham, NH	L 16–24		
October 24	Villanova	Parsons Field; Brookline, MA	W 41–28	4,100	
October 31	Southern Connecticut State	Parsons Field; Brookline, MA	W 51–10		
November 7	at Rhode Island	Meade Stadium; Kingston, RI	W 21–3	6,994	
November 14	at No. 11 James Madison	JMU Stadium; Harrisonburg, VA	L 3–13	9,106	
November 21	UMass	Parsons Field; Brookline, MA	L 7–27	3,830	
Rankings from NCAA Division I-AA Football Committee Poll released prior to the game
