= 1987 South Carolina State Bulldogs football team =

American college football season

1987 South Carolina State Bulldogs football
- Conference: Mid-Eastern Athletic Conference
- Record: 7–4 (4–1 MEAC)
- Head coach: Dennis Thomas (2nd season)
- Home stadium: Oliver C. Dawson Stadium

1987 Mid-Eastern Athletic Conference football standings
	Conf.					Overall
Team	W		L		T	W		L		T
No. 20 Delaware State $	5	–	0	–	0	9	–	1	–	0
No. 18 Howard	4	–	1	–	0	8	–	2	–	0
South Carolina State	3	–	2	–	0	6	–	5	–	0
Bethune–Cookman	2	–	3	–	0	4	–	7	–	0
North Carolina A&T	1	–	4	–	0	3	–	8	–	0
Morgan State	0	–	5	–	0	1	–	9	–	0
Florida A&M	0	–	0	–	0	5	–	5	–	1
$ – Conference champion; Florida A&M games did not count as conference games in 1987; records adjusted for Howard and Arkansas Pine–Bluff forfeits to Delaware State; Rankings from NCAA Division I-AA Football Committee poll

The 1987 South Carolina State Bulldogs football team represented South Carolina State College (now known as South Carolina State University) as a member of the Mid-Eastern Athletic Conference (MEAC) during the 1987 NCAA Division I-AA football season. Led by second-year head coach Dennis Thomas, the Bulldogs compiled an overall record of 7–4, with a mark of 4–1 in conference play, and finished second in the MEAC.

== Schedule ==
Date	Opponent	Site	Result	Attendance	Source
September 5	No. 13 Furman*	Oliver C. Dawson Stadium; Orangeburg, SC	L 7–25	11,803	
September 19	North Carolina A&T	Oliver C. Dawson Stadium; Orangeburg, SC (rivalry)	W 12–0		
September 26	at Howard	William H. Greene Stadium; Washington, DC	W 22–31 (forfeit win)		
October 3	at Elizabeth City State*	Roebuck Stadium; Elizabeth City, NC	W 39–6		
October 10	at Morgan State	Hughes Stadium; Baltimore, MD	W 41–14	12,000	
October 17	Bethune–Cookman	Oliver C. Dawson Stadium; Orangeburg, SC	W 41–20	18,507	
October 24	Florida A&M	Oliver C. Dawson Stadium; Orangeburg, SC	W 20–10	9,242	
October 31	No. 11 Delaware State	Oliver C. Dawson Stadium; Orangeburg, SC	L 7–28	6,143	
November 7	at Virginia Union*	Hovey Field; Richmond, VA	L 22–24	2,438	
November 12	at Grambling State*	Eddie G. Robinson Memorial Stadium; Grambling, LA	W 15–13		
November 21	No. 6 Georgia Southern*	Oliver C. Dawson Stadium; Orangeburg, SC	L 13–30	10,048	
*Non-conference game; Rankings from NCAA Division I-AA Football Committee Poll released prior to the game
