= Steve Stetson =

American football player & coach (born 1951)

Current position
- Title: Head coach (golf)
- Team: Hamilton
- Conference: NESCAC

Biographical details
- Born: January 24, 1951 (age 75); Laconia, New Hampshire, U.S.

Playing career

Football
- 1970–1972: Dartmouth
- Position: Quarterback

Coaching career (HC unless noted)

Football
- 1982–1984: Hamilton
- 1985–1987: Boston University
- 1992–2001: Hartwick
- 2002–2005: New Hampshire (assistant)
- 2006–2011: Hamilton

Golf
- 2012–2017: Hamilton

Head coaching record
- Overall: 86–106–4 (football)

Accomplishments and honors

Awards
- New England Region D-III Coach of the Year (1984)

Stephen Stetson (born January 24, 1951) is an American golf coach and former football player and coach. He is the current head men's and women's golf coach at Hamilton College in Clinton, New York. Stetson served as the head football coach at Hamilton from 1982 to 1984 and again from 2006 to 2011. He was also the head football coach at Boston University from 1985 to 1987 and Hartwick College from 1992 to 2001, compiling a career college football coaching record of 89–111–2. Stetson was a University of New Hampshire assistant football coach from 2002 to 2005.

Stetson grew up in Laconia, New Hampshire and was a three-sport standout at Laconia High School. He became an All-Ivy League quarterback at Dartmouth College during his senior season in 1972. In his three-year varsity career, the Big Green went 24–2–1 with three straight Ivy League championships.

== College career ==
Stetson played for Dartmouth College. In 1969, he was awarded the Earl Hamilton Freshman Award by the coaching staff. In 1971, in his first start, he helped Dartmouth clinch a share of the Ivy League title by beating Cornell 24–14. In his senior year, he won several weekly citations due to his impressive performance against Princeton, in which he scored three touchdowns and completed eight of 17 passes for 125 yards. He set a Dartmouth single-season pass-yardage record (1159 yards), breaking the 1079 set by Mickey Beard in 1966. He was an all-Ivy selection that year. He graduated from Dartmouth with a degree in sociology in 1973.

== Coaching career ==
=== Hamilton ===
Stetson first coached the Hamilton Continentals football team from 1982 to 1984. In 1983, he hired Sean McDonnell to be one of his assistant coaches. In 1984, they went 6–1–1. This was Hamilton's first winning record since 1967.

=== Boston University ===
Stetson's performance at Hamilton led to a head coaching position at Boston University, a Division I school. He took over from Rick Taylor, who had moved up to become the school's athletic director. However, he struggled in his time there, with a record of 3–8 in 1985 and 4–7 in 1986. Two games before the 1987 season was finished, he was dismissed as the team was at 3–6. Boston finished the season 3–8.

=== Hartwick ===
After his job at Boston ended, Stetson became a health-insurance salesman. When he saw in the newspapers that Hartwick College would revive its football program, he applied for the job in July 1991 and got accepted. He coached the Hawks until 2001, and Hartwick enjoyed eight winning seasons out of his last nine at the school with three postseason appearances. When he left the school in 2002, Mark Carr took over. He had a record of 58–38–1 in his time there, setting the program record for most career wins. Carr would break that record in 2015.

=== New Hampshire ===
Stetson then joined the coaching staff of Sean McDonnell, his former assistant coach, now head coach at the University of New Hampshire. The Wildcats were 3–8 in his first year, but in 2004, UNH was 10–3 and reached the quarterfinals of the NCAA Division I-AA championships. In 2005, he helped guide the Wildcats to an 11–2 record and the team's second straight Atlantic 10 North Division title. UNH was awarded the No. 1 seed in the Division I-AA championships and advanced to the quarterfinals for the second consecutive year.

=== Return to Hamilton ===
In 2005, Stetson returned to coaching the Hamilton men's football team. He took over from Pete Alvanos, whose teams went 5–35 in five seasons. In 2011, Stetson guided the football team to their highest win total in 15 years. He stepped down as Hamilton's men's football head coach the following year. He was replaced by Andrew Cohen.

In 2012, Stetson became the new head coach of Hamilton's men's and women's golf teams. He had previous experience as an interim head coach for Hamilton's men's golf team earlier in the year.

== Personal life ==
Stetson participated in amateur golf tournaments. In 2010, he won the Senior championship of the Utica City Amateur golf tournament.

== Head coaching record ==
=== Football ===
Year	Team	Overall	Conference	Standing	Bowl/playoffs
Hamilton Continentals (NCAA Division III independent) (1982–1984)
1982	Hamilton	1–7			
1983	Hamilton	2–6			
1984	Hamilton	6–1–1			
Boston University Terriers (Yankee Conference) (1985–1987)
1985	Boston University	3–8	1–4	T–5th	
1986	Boston University	4–7	3–4	T–5th	
1987	Boston University	3–8	2–5	T–5th	
Boston University:		10–23	6–13		
Hartwick Hawks (NCAA Division III independent) (1992–2001)
1992	Hartwick	1–7			
1993	Hartwick	4–3–1			
1994	Hartwick	7–3			
1995	Hartwick	4–5–2			
1996	Hartwick	6–4			
1997	Hartwick	7–2			
1998	Hartwick	9–2			L ECAC Northwest Championship
1999	Hartwick	6–4			
2000	Hartwick	7–4			L ECAC Northwest Championship
2001	Hartwick	7–4			L ECAC Northwest Championship
Hartwick:		57–38–3			
Hamilton Continentals (New England Small College Athletic Conference) (2006–present)
2006	Hamilton	2–6	2–6	T–7th	
2007	Hamilton	2–6	2–6	T–8th	
2008	Hamilton	2–6	2–6	T–8th	
2009	Hamilton	2–6	2–6	T–8th	
2010	Hamilton	1–7	1–7	T–9th	
2011	Hamilton	3–5	3–5	T–6th	
Hamilton:		21–50–1	12–36		
Total:		89–111–2			
