= 1987 James Madison Dukes football team =

American college football season

1987 James Madison Dukes football

NCAA Division I-AA First Round, L 12–41 vs. Marshall
- Conference: Independent
- Record: 9–3
- Head coach: Joe Purzycki (3rd season)
- Home stadium: JMU Stadium

1987 NCAA Division I-AA independents football standings
	Conf.			Overall
Team	W	L	T	W		L		T
No. 6 Georgia Southern ^		–		9	–	4	–	0
No. 8 James Madison ^		–		9	–	3	–	0
No. 12 Arkansas State ^		–		8	–	4	–	1
No. 11 Western Kentucky ^		–		7	–	4	–	0
Villanova		–		6	–	4	–	0
Northeastern		–		6	–	5	–	0
Nicholls State		–		5	–	5	–	1
Florida A&M		–		5	–	5	–	1
William & Mary		–		5	–	6	–	0
Towson State		–		4	–	6	–	0
Tennessee State		–		3	–	7	–	1
Lamar		–		3	–	8	–	0
Louisiana Tech		–		3	–	8	–	0
^ – NCAA Division I-AA playoff participant; Rankings from NCAA Division I-AA Football Committee poll

The 1987 James Madison Dukes football team was an American football team that represented James Madison University during the 1987 NCAA Division I-AA football season as an independent. In their third year under head coach Joe Purzycki, the team compiled a 9–3 record.

== Schedule ==
Date	Opponent	Rank	Site	Result	Attendance	Source
September 5	Rhode Island		JMU Stadium; Harrisonburg, VA	W 38–0	3,300	
September 12	at Appalachian State		Conrad Stadium; Boone, NC	L 10–17	12,862	
September 19	Morehead State		JMU Stadium; Harrisonburg, VA	W 44–10	3,100	
September 26	at UMass		McGuirk Stadium; Hadley, MA	W 21–15	10,303	
October 10	Richmond	No. 9	JMU Stadium; Harrisonburg, VA (rivalry)	W 41–3	16,030	
October 17	at VMI	No. 6	Alumni Memorial Field; Lexington, VA	W 20–17	8,500	
October 24	at William & Mary	No. 5	Cary Field; Williamsburg, VA (rivalry)	W 28–22	16,103	
October 31	Towson State	No. 4	JMU Stadium; Harrisonburg, VA	W 21–19	16,500	
November 7	at No. 12 Georgia Southern	No. 3	Paulson Stadium; Statesboro, GA	L 7–26	16,734	
November 14	Northeastern	No. 11	JMU Stadium; Harrisonburg, VA	W 13–3	9,106	
November 21	at East Tennessee State	No. 9	Memorial Center; Johnson City, TN	W 28–24		
November 28	at No. 14 Marshall	No. 8	Fairfield Stadium; Huntington, WV (NCAA Division I-AA First Round)	L 12–41	15,584	
Rankings from NCAA Division I-AA Football Committee Poll released prior to the game
