= 1987 Towson State Tigers football team =

American college football season

1987 Towson State Tigers football
- Conference: Independent
- Record: 4–6
- Head coach: Phil Albert (16th season)
- Home stadium: Minnegan Stadium

1987 NCAA Division I-AA independents football standings
	Conf.			Overall
Team	W	L	T	W		L		T
No. 6 Georgia Southern ^		–		9	–	4	–	0
No. 8 James Madison ^		–		9	–	3	–	0
No. 12 Arkansas State ^		–		8	–	4	–	1
No. 11 Western Kentucky ^		–		7	–	4	–	0
Villanova		–		6	–	4	–	0
Northeastern		–		6	–	5	–	0
Nicholls State		–		5	–	5	–	1
William & Mary		–		5	–	6	–	0
Towson State		–		4	–	6	–	0
Tennessee State		–		3	–	7	–	1
Lamar		–		3	–	8	–	0
Louisiana Tech		–		3	–	8	–	0
^ – NCAA Division I-AA playoff participant; Rankings from NCAA Division I-AA Football Committee poll

The 1987 Towson State Tigers football team was an American football team that represented Towson State University (now known as Towson University) as an independent during the 1987 NCAA Division I-AA football season. Led by 16th-year head coach Phil Albert, the team compiled a 4–6 record.

== Schedule ==
Date	Opponent	Site	Result	Attendance	Source
September 12	at Northeastern	Parsons Field; Brookline, MA	L 22–39	1,350	
September 19	IUP	Minnegan Stadium; Towson, MD	L 7–10		
October 3	at No. 3 Maine	Alumni Field; Orono, ME	W 17–14	1,755	
October 10	Howard	Minnegan Stadium; Towson, MD	W 30–14	4,718	
October 17	Morgan State	Minnegan Stadium; Towson, MD (rivalry)	W 39–10		
October 24	No. 13 Delaware State	Minnegan Stadium; Towson, MD	L 17–40	4,520	
October 31	at No. 4 James Madison	JMU Stadium; Harrisonburg, VA	L 19–21	16,500	
November 7	at No. 10 (D-II) New Haven	Dodds Stadium; West Haven, CT	L 7–21		
November 14	at Liberty	City Stadium; Lynchburg, VA	L 14–31	6,575	
November 21	Rhode Island	Minnegan Stadium; Towson, MD	W 19–16	587	
Rankings from NCAA Division I-AA Football Committee Poll released prior to the game
