= 1987 Texas Southern Tigers football team =

American college football season

1987 Texas Southern Tigers football
- Conference: Southwestern Athletic Conference
- Record: 5–6 (3–4 SWAC)
- Head coach: Lionel Taylor (4th season)
- Home stadium: Robertson Stadium; Rice Stadium

1987 Southwestern Athletic Conference football standings
| | Conf. | | | | | Overall |
| Team | W | | L | | T | W | | L | | T |
|---|---|---|---|---|---|---|---|---|---|---|
| No. 9 Jackson State $^ | 7 | – | 0 | – | 0 | 8 | – | 3 | – | 1 |
| Southern | 5 | – | 2 | – | 0 | 7 | – | 4 | – | 0 |
| Alcorn State | 5 | – | 2 | – | 0 | 6 | – | 3 | – | 0 |
| Alabama State | 4 | – | 3 | – | 0 | 8 | – | 3 | – | 0 |
| Grambling State | 3 | – | 4 | – | 0 | 5 | – | 6 | – | 0 |
| Texas Southern | 3 | – | 4 | – | 0 | 5 | – | 6 | – | 0 |
| Prairie View A&M | 1 | – | 6 | – | 0 | 3 | – | 8 | – | 0 |
| Mississippi Valley State | 0 | – | 7 | – | 0 | 1 | – | 10 | – | 0 |
$ – Conference champion; ^ – NCAA Division I-AA playoff participant; Rankings from NCAA Division I-AA Football Committee poll

The 1987 Texas Southern Tigers football team represented Texas Southern University as a member of the Southwestern Athletic Conference (SWAC) during the 1987 NCAA Division I-AA football season. Led by fourth-year head coach Lionel Taylor, the Tigers compiled an overall record of 5–6, with a mark of 3–4 in conference play, and finished tied for fifth in the SWAC.

== Schedule ==
| Date | Opponent | Site | Result | Attendance | Source |
|---|---|---|---|---|---|
| September 5 | Prairie View A&M | Robertson Stadium; Houston, TX (Labor Day Classic) | W 30–21 | | |
| September 12 | Angelo State* | Rice Stadium; Houston, TX | L 7–14 | | |
| September 19 | at No. 20 Southern | A. W. Mumford Stadium; Baton Rouge, LA | L 13–33 | | |
| September 26 | Alabama State | Robertson Stadium; Houston, TX | W 31–9 | | |
| October 3 | at Sam Houston State* | Bowers Stadium; Huntsville, TX | L 7–45 | | |
| October 10 | Alcorn State | Rice Stadium; Houston, TX | L 21–24 | | |
| October 17 | Arkansas–Pine Bluff* | Robertson Stadium; Houston, TX | W 23–17 | | |
| October 24 | at Mississippi Valley State | Magnolia Stadium; Itta Bena, MS | W 31–17 | | |
| October 31 | at Grambling State | Eddie G. Robinson Memorial Stadium; Grambling, LA | L 9–30 | | |
| November 7 | No. 5 Jackson State | Rice Stadium; Houston, TX | L 14–33 | | |
| November 14 | at Tennessee State* | Hale Stadium; Nashville, TN | W 30–21 | 3,900 | |
*Non-conference game; Rankings from NCAA Division I-AA Football Committee Poll released prior to the game
