= 1987 Connecticut Huskies football team =

American college football season

1987 Connecticut Huskies football
- Conference: Yankee Conference
- Record: 7–4 (5–2 Yankee)
- Head coach: Tom Jackson (5th season)
- Home stadium: Memorial Stadium

1987 Yankee Conference football standings
	Conf.					Overall
Team	W		L		T	W		L		T
No. 13 Maine +^	6	–	1	–	0	8	–	4	–	0
No. 17 Richmond +^	6	–	1	–	0	7	–	5	–	0
Connecticut	5	–	2	–	0	7	–	4	–	0
New Hampshire	4	–	3	–	0	7	–	3	–	0
Delaware	2	–	5	–	0	5	–	6	–	0
UMass	2	–	5	–	0	3	–	8	–	0
Boston University	2	–	5	–	0	3	–	8	–	0
Rhode Island	1	–	6	–	0	1	–	10	–	0
+ – Conference co-champions; ^ – NCAA Division I-AA playoff participant; Rankings from NCAA Division I-AA Football Committee poll

The 1987 Connecticut Huskies football team represented the University of Connecticut in the 1987 NCAA Division I-AA football season. The Huskies were led by fifth-year head coach Tom Jackson, and completed the season with a record of 7–4.

== Schedule ==
Date	Opponent	Site	Result	Attendance	Source
September 12	Southern Connecticut*	Memorial Stadium; Storrs, CT	W 38–21	6,513	
September 19	Northeastern*	Memorial Stadium; Storrs, CT	L 12–20	7,728	
September 26	at Yale*	Yale Bowl; New Haven, CT	L 27–30	34,068	
October 3	at No. T–9 Richmond	UR Stadium; Richmond, VA	W 21–14	8,966	
October 10	at Boston University	Nickerson Field; Boston, MA	L 7–31	4,026	
October 17	UMass	Memorial Stadium; Storrs, CT (rivalry)	W 21–17	8,013	
October 24	at Maine	Alumni Field; Orono, ME	L 28–32		
October 31	Villanova*	Memorial Stadium; Storrs, CT	W 34–23	11,540	
November 7	Delaware	Memorial Stadium; Storrs, CT	W 20–19	3,498	
November 14	at Rhode Island	Meade Stadium; Kingston, RI (rivalry)	W 52–7	3,906	
November 21	No. T–16 New Hampshire	Memorial Stadium; Storrs, CT	W 31–21	2,616	
*Non-conference game; Rankings from NCAA Division I-AA Football Committee Poll released prior to the game
