= 1987 Prairie View A&M Panthers football team =

American college football season

1987 Prairie View A&M Panthers football
- Conference: Southwestern Athletic Conference
- Record: 4–6–1 (1–6 SWAC)
- Head coach: Conway Hayman (4th season; first 4 games); Haney Catchings (interim; games 5–11)
- Offensive coordinator: Haney Catchings (2nd season; first 4 games)
- Defensive coordinator: Ronald Beard (4th season)
- Home stadium: Edward L. Blackshear Field; Rice Stadium

1987 Southwestern Athletic Conference football standings
	Conf.					Overall
Team	W		L		T	W		L		T
No. 9 Jackson State $^	7	–	0	–	0	8	–	3	–	1
Southern	5	–	2	–	0	7	–	4	–	0
Alcorn State	5	–	2	–	0	6	–	3	–	0
Alabama State	4	–	3	–	0	8	–	3	–	0
Grambling State	3	–	4	–	0	5	–	6	–	0
Texas Southern	3	–	4	–	0	5	–	6	–	0
Prairie View A&M	1	–	6	–	0	3	–	8	–	0
Mississippi Valley State	0	–	7	–	0	1	–	10	–	0
$ – Conference champion; ^ – NCAA Division I-AA playoff participant; Rankings from NCAA Division I-AA Football Committee poll

The 1987 Prairie View A&M Panthers football team represented Prairie View A&M University as a member of the Southwestern Athletic Conference (SWAC) during the 1987 NCAA Division I-AA football season. The Panthers compiled an overall record of 4–6–1 and a mark of 1–6 in conference play, and finished seventh in the SWAC.

After their loss to Southern, fourth-year head coach Conway Hayman was fired with a record of 0–3–1. He was replaced with offensive coordinator Haney Catchings as interim head coach for the remainder of the season, who finished the season with a 4–3 record.

== Schedule ==
Date	Opponent	Site	Result	Attendance	Source
September 5	at Texas Southern	Robertson Stadium; Houston, TX (Labor Day Classic)	L 21–30		
September 12	at Stephen F. Austin*	Homer Bryce Stadium; Nacogdoches, TX	T 13–13		
September 19	Jackson State	Rice Stadium; Houston, TX	L 12–16	4,000	
September 26	vs. Southern	Cotton Bowl; Dallas, TX	L 0–14		
October 3	vs. Grambling State	Cotton Bowl; Dallas, TX (State Fair Classic)	L 7–28	35,752	
October 10	at Arkansas–Pine Bluff*	War Memorial Stadium; Little Rock, AR	W 28–41 (forfeit win)		
October 17	at Texas Lutheran*	Matador Stadium; Seguin, TX	W 17–16		
October 24	at Alabama State	Cramton Bowl; Montgomery, AL	L 7–24		
October 31	Mississippi Valley State	Waller, TX	W 20–0		
November 16	at Alcorn State	Henderson Stadium; Lorman, MS	L 19–20		
November 21	at Langston*	Anderson Stadium; Langston, OK	W 35–6	450	
*Non-conference game
