= 1987 Villanova Wildcats football team =

American college football season

1987 Villanova Wildcats football
- Conference: Independent
- Record: 6–4
- Head coach: Andy Talley (3rd season)
- Home stadium: Villanova Stadium

1987 NCAA Division I-AA independents football standings
	Conf.			Overall
Team	W	L	T	W		L		T
No. 6 Georgia Southern ^		–		9	–	4	–	0
No. 8 James Madison ^		–		9	–	3	–	0
No. 12 Arkansas State ^		–		8	–	4	–	1
No. 11 Western Kentucky ^		–		7	–	4	–	0
Villanova		–		6	–	4	–	0
Northeastern		–		6	–	5	–	0
Nicholls State		–		5	–	5	–	1
William & Mary		–		5	–	6	–	0
Towson State		–		4	–	6	–	0
Tennessee State		–		3	–	7	–	1
Lamar		–		3	–	8	–	0
Louisiana Tech		–		3	–	8	–	0
^ – NCAA Division I-AA playoff participant; Rankings from NCAA Division I-AA Football Committee poll

The 1987 Villanova Wildcats football team was an American football team that represented the Villanova University as an independent during the 1987 NCAA Division I-AA football season. In their third year under head coach Andy Talley, the team compiled a 6–4 record.

== Schedule ==
Date	Opponent	Site	Result	Attendance	Source
September 19	at Liberty	City Stadium; Lynchburg, VA	W 24–20	8,530	
September 26	Mercyhurst	Villanova Stadium; Villanova, PA	W 35–26	11,217	
October 3	Boston University	Villanova Stadium; Villanova, PA	W 14–7	13,400	
October 10	at Central Connecticut State	Arute Field; New Britain, CT	W 52–20		
October 17	Catholic University	Villanova Stadium; Villanova, PA	W 46–7	8,656	
October 24	at Northeastern	Parsons Field; Brookline, MA	L 28–41	4,100	
October 31	at Connecticut	Memorial Stadium; Storrs, CT	L 23–34	11,540	
November 7	UMass	Villanova Stadium; Villanova, PA	W 44–27	13,400	
November 14	at Richmond	City Stadium; Richmond, VA	L 35–38	17,868	
November 19	Holy Cross	Villanova Stadium; Villanova, PA	L 6–39	13,400	
