= 1987 Morgan State Bears football team =

American college football season

1987 Morgan State Bears football
- Conference: Mid-Eastern Athletic Conference
- Record: 2–8 (1–4 MEAC)
- Head coach: Jesse Thomas (3rd season)
- Home stadium: Hughes Stadium

1987 Mid-Eastern Athletic Conference football standings
	Conf.					Overall
Team	W		L		T	W		L		T
No. 20 Delaware State $	5	–	0	–	0	9	–	1	–	0
No. 18 Howard	4	–	1	–	0	8	–	2	–	0
South Carolina State	3	–	2	–	0	6	–	5	–	0
Bethune–Cookman	2	–	3	–	0	4	–	7	–	0
North Carolina A&T	1	–	4	–	0	3	–	8	–	0
Morgan State	0	–	5	–	0	1	–	9	–	0
Florida A&M	0	–	0	–	0	5	–	5	–	1
$ – Conference champion; Florida A&M games did not count as conference games in 1987; records adjusted for Howard and Arkansas Pine–Bluff forfeits to Delaware State; Rankings from NCAA Division I-AA Football Committee poll

The 1987 Morgan State Bears football team represented Morgan State University as a member of the Mid-Eastern Athletic Conference (MEAC) during the 1987 NCAA Division I-AA football season. Led by third-year head coach Jesse Thomas, the Bears compiled an overall record of 2–8, with a mark of 1–4 in conference play, and finished fifth in the MEAC.

== Schedule ==
Date	Opponent	Site	Result	Attendance	Source
September 5	Virginia Union*	Hughes Stadium; Baltimore, MD	L 3–7		
September 12	Bethune–Cookman	Hughes Stadium; Baltimore, MD	L 22–34	3,400	
September 19	at Delaware State	Alumni Stadium; Dover, DE	L 7–30	3,200	
September 26	at North Carolina A&T	Aggie Stadium; Greensboro, NC	L 17–35		
October 10	South Carolina State	Hughes Stadium; Baltimore, MD	L 14–41	12,000	
October 17	at Towson State*	Minnegan Stadium; Towson, MD (rivalry)	L 10–39		
October 24	at Tennessee State*	Hale Stadium; Nashville, TN	L 17–37	3,500	
October 31	District of Columbia*	Hughes Stadium; Baltimore, MD	W 14–3	300	
November 7	at Elizabeth City State*	Roebuck Stadium; Elizabeth City, NC	L 14–21	13,977	
November 14	Howard	Hughes Stadium; Baltimore, MD (rivalry)	W 0–62 (forfeit win)	3,100	
*Non-conference game
