= 1987 Arkansas State Indians football team =

American college football season

1987 Arkansas State Indians football

NCAA Division I-AA Quarterfinal, L 28–49 vs. Northern Iowa
- Conference: Independent

Ranking
- FCS Coaches: No. 12
- Record: 8–4–1
- Head coach: Larry Lacewell (9th season)
- Home stadium: Indian Stadium

1987 NCAA Division I-AA independents football standings
	Conf.			Overall
Team	W	L	T	W		L		T
No. 6 Georgia Southern ^		–		9	–	4	–	0
No. 8 James Madison ^		–		9	–	3	–	0
No. 12 Arkansas State ^		–		8	–	4	–	1
No. 11 Western Kentucky ^		–		7	–	4	–	0
Villanova		–		6	–	4	–	0
Northeastern		–		6	–	5	–	0
Nicholls State		–		5	–	5	–	1
Florida A&M		–		5	–	5	–	1
William & Mary		–		5	–	6	–	0
Towson State		–		4	–	6	–	0
Tennessee State		–		3	–	7	–	1
Lamar		–		3	–	8	–	0
Louisiana Tech		–		3	–	8	–	0
^ – NCAA Division I-AA playoff participant; Rankings from NCAA Division I-AA Football Committee poll

The 1987 Arkansas State Indians football team represented Arkansas State University as an independent during the 1987 NCAA Division I-AA football season. Led by ninth-year head coach Larry Lacewell, the Indians finished the season with a record of 8–4–1. Arkansas State advanced to the advanced to the NCAA Division I-AA Football Championship playoffs, where they defeated Jackson State in the first round and lost to Northern Iowa in the quarterfinals.

== Schedule ==
Date	Opponent	Rank	Site	Result	Attendance	Source
September 5	Northwestern State	No. 2	Indian Stadium; Jonesboro, AR	L 20–23	17,114	
September 12	Mississippi College	No. 2	Indian Stadium; Jonesboro, AR	W 35–0		
September 19	at Ole Miss		Vaught–Hemingway Stadium; Oxford, MS	L 10–47	24,000	
September 26	East Texas State		Indian Stadium; Jonesboro, AR	W 77–22	12,330	
October 3	at McNeese State		Cowboy Stadium; Lake Charles, LA	W 17–0		
October 17	Louisiana Tech		Indian Stadium; Jonesboro, AR	W 37–3	17,311	
October 24	at Southern Illinois	No. T–17	McAndrew Stadium; Carbondale, IL	W 33–9	5,800	
October 31	at Memphis State	No. 15	Liberty Bowl Memorial Stadium; Memphis, TN (rivalry)	T 21–21	21,421	
November 7	No. 4 North Texas State^{†}	No. 15	Indian Stadium; Jonesboro, AR	W 27–20		
November 14	at Lamar	No. 10	Cardinal Stadium; Beaumont, TX	W 34–20		
November 21	at No. 3 Northeast Louisiana	No. 8	Malone Stadium; Monroe, LA	L 21–31		
November 28	at No. 9 Jackson State	No. 12	Mississippi Veterans Memorial Stadium; Jackson, MS (NCAA Division I-AA First Round)	W 35–32	7,500	
December 5	at No. 4 Northern Iowa	No. 12	UNI-Dome; Cedar Falls, IA (NCAA Division I-AA Quarterfinal)	L 28–49	6,100	
^{†}Homecoming; Rankings from NCAA Division I-AA Football Committee Poll released prior to the game
