= 1987 Mississippi Valley State Delta Devils football team =

American college football season

1987 Mississippi Valley State Delta Devils football
- Conference: Southwestern Athletic Conference
- Record: 1–10 (0–7 SWAC)
- Head coach: Kenneth Pettiford (1st season)
- Home stadium: Magnolia Stadium

1987 Southwestern Athletic Conference football standings
| | Conf. | | | | | Overall |
| Team | W | | L | | T | W | | L | | T |
|---|---|---|---|---|---|---|---|---|---|---|
| No. 9 Jackson State $^ | 7 | – | 0 | – | 0 | 8 | – | 3 | – | 1 |
| Southern | 5 | – | 2 | – | 0 | 7 | – | 4 | – | 0 |
| Alcorn State | 5 | – | 2 | – | 0 | 6 | – | 3 | – | 0 |
| Alabama State | 4 | – | 3 | – | 0 | 8 | – | 3 | – | 0 |
| Grambling State | 3 | – | 4 | – | 0 | 5 | – | 6 | – | 0 |
| Texas Southern | 3 | – | 4 | – | 0 | 5 | – | 6 | – | 0 |
| Prairie View A&M | 1 | – | 6 | – | 0 | 3 | – | 8 | – | 0 |
| Mississippi Valley State | 0 | – | 7 | – | 0 | 1 | – | 10 | – | 0 |
$ – Conference champion; ^ – NCAA Division I-AA playoff participant; Rankings from NCAA Division I-AA Football Committee poll

The 1987 Mississippi Valley State Delta Devils football team represented Mississippi Valley State University as a member of the Southwestern Athletic Conference (SWAC) during the 1987 NCAA Division I-AA football season. Led by first-year head coach Kenneth Pettiford, the Delta Devils compiled an overall record of 1–10, with a conference record of 0–7, and finished eighth in the SWAC.

== Schedule ==
| Date | Opponent | Site | Result | Attendance | Source |
|---|---|---|---|---|---|
| September 5 | at Alabama A&M* | Milton Frank Stadium; Huntsville, AL | L 0–27 | | |
| September 12 | Arkansas–Pine Bluff* | Magnolia Stadium; Itta Bena, MS | W 16–7 | | |
| September 19 | at Florida A&M* | Bragg Memorial Stadium; Tallahassee, FL | L 0–10 | 6,939 | |
| September 26 | at No. 15 Jackson State | Mississippi Veterans Memorial Stadium; Jackson, MS | L 0–46 | | |
| October 3 | No. 16 Southern | Magnolia Stadium; Itta Bena, MS | L 14–17 | | |
| October 10 | vs. Middle Tennessee* | Liberty Bowl Memorial Stadium; Memphis, TN | L 7–38 | 2,547 | |
| October 17 | at Grambling State | Eddie G. Robinson Memorial Stadium; Grambling, LA | L 14–45 | | |
| October 24 | Texas Southern | Magnolia Stadium; Itta Bena, MS | L 17–31 | | |
| October 31 | at Prairie View A&M | Waller, TX | L 0–20 | | |
| November 7 | at Alcorn State | Henderson Stadium; Lorman, MS | L 13–21 | | |
| November 14 | at Alabama State | Cramton Bowl; Montgomery, AL | L 0–21 | 8,500 | |
*Non-conference game; Rankings from NCAA Division I-AA Football Committee Poll released prior to the game
