= 1987 Nicholls State Colonels football team =

American college football season

1987 Nicholls State Colonels football
- Conference: Independent
- Record: 5–5–1
- Head coach: Phil Greco (1st season)
- Home stadium: John L. Guidry Stadium

1987 NCAA Division I-AA independents football standings
	Conf.			Overall
Team	W	L	T	W		L		T
No. 6 Georgia Southern ^		–		9	–	4	–	0
No. 8 James Madison ^		–		9	–	3	–	0
No. 12 Arkansas State ^		–		8	–	4	–	1
No. 11 Western Kentucky ^		–		7	–	4	–	0
Villanova		–		6	–	4	–	0
Northeastern		–		6	–	5	–	0
Nicholls State		–		5	–	5	–	1
William & Mary		–		5	–	6	–	0
Towson State		–		4	–	6	–	0
Tennessee State		–		3	–	7	–	1
Lamar		–		3	–	8	–	0
Louisiana Tech		–		3	–	8	–	0
^ – NCAA Division I-AA playoff participant; Rankings from NCAA Division I-AA Football Committee poll

The 1987 Nicholls State Colonels football team represented Nicholls State University as an independent during the 1987 NCAA Division I-AA football season. Led by first-year head coach Phil Greco, the Colonels compiled a record of 5–5–1. Nicholls State played home games at John L. Guidry Stadium in Thibodaux, Louisiana.

== Schedule ==
Date	Opponent	Rank	Site	Result	Attendance	Source
September 5	St. Cloud State		John L. Guidry Stadium; Thibodaux, LA	W 17–3	6,000	
September 12	No. 25 (D-II) Troy State		John L. Guidry Stadium; Thibodaux, LA	T 17–17	2,020	
September 19	at No. 18 Southwest Missouri State		Briggs Stadium; Springfield, MO	W 21–9	7,820	
September 26	at No. 3 Northeast Louisiana		Malone Stadium; Monroe, LA	L 14–26	19,638	
October 3	Alcorn State		John L. Guidry Stadium; Thibodaux, LA	W 14–3		
October 10	at No. T–7 Southern		A. W. Mumford Stadium; Baton Rouge, LA	W 27–21		
October 17	Stephen F. Austin	No. 15	John L. Guidry Stadium; Thibodaux, LA	L 21–24		
October 24	Southwest Texas State		John L. Guidry Stadium; Thibodaux, LA (rivalry)	L 16–31		
October 31	at Akron		Rubber Bowl; Akron, OH	L 17–23	4,217	
November 7	Northwestern State		John L. Guidry Stadium; Thibodaux, LA (rivalry)	L 28–31		
November 14	at McNeese State		Cowboy Stadium; Lake Charles, LA	W 29–7		
Rankings from NCAA Division I-AA Football Committee Poll released prior to the game
