= 1987 Howard Bison football team =

American college football season

1987 Howard Bison football

Black college national champion
- Conference: Mid-Eastern Athletic Conference
- Record: 0–10, 9 wins forfeited (0–5 MEAC, 5 wins forfeited)
- Head coach: Willie Jeffries (4th season)
- Home stadium: William H. Greene Stadium

1987 Mid-Eastern Athletic Conference football standings
	Conf.					Overall
Team	W		L		T	W		L		T
No. 20 Delaware State $	5	–	0	–	0	9	–	1	–	0
No. 18 Howard	4	–	1	–	0	8	–	2	–	0
South Carolina State	3	–	2	–	0	6	–	5	–	0
Bethune–Cookman	2	–	3	–	0	4	–	7	–	0
North Carolina A&T	1	–	4	–	0	3	–	8	–	0
Morgan State	0	–	5	–	0	1	–	9	–	0
Florida A&M	0	–	0	–	0	5	–	5	–	1
$ – Conference champion; Florida A&M games did not count as conference games in 1987; records adjusted for Howard and Arkansas Pine–Bluff forfeits to Delaware State; Rankings from NCAA Division I-AA Football Committee poll

The 1987 Howard Bison football team represented Howard University as a member of the Mid-Eastern Athletic Conference (MEAC) during the 1987 NCAA Division I-AA football season. Led by fourth-year head coach Willie Jeffries, the Bison compiled an overall record of 9–1, with a conference record of 5–0, and finished as MEAC champion. At the conclusion of the season, the Bison were also recognized as black college national champion.

In 1989 the MEAC title was forfeited along with all nine victories for the season after it was discovered numerous ineligible players competed during the season.

== Schedule ==
Date	Opponent	Site	Result	Attendance	Source
September 12	Newberry*	William H. Greene Stadium; Washington, DC	L 45–0 (forfeit)	9,500	
September 19	at Bethune–Cookman	Daytona Stadium; Daytona Beach, FL	L 58–51 (forfeit)	5,300	
September 26	South Carolina State	William H. Greene Stadium; Washington, DC	L 31–22 (forfeit)		
October 10	at Towson State*	Minnegan Stadium; Towson, MD	L 14–30	4,718	
October 17	Virginia State*	William H. Greene Stadium; Washington, DC	L 56–14 (forfeit)	13,589	
October 24	at North Carolina A&T	Aggie Stadium; Greensboro, NC	L 34–21 (forfeit)	10,500	
October 31	Norfolk State*	William H. Greene Stadium; Washington, DC	L 43–3 (forfeit)	13,589	
November 7	Morehouse*	William H. Greene Stadium; Washington, DC	L 54–7 (forfeit)		
November 14	at Morgan State	Hughes Stadium; Baltimore, MD (rivalry)	L 62–0 (forfeit)	3,100	
November 21	at Delaware State	Alumni Stadium; Dover, DE	L 12–7 (forfeit)		
*Non-conference game
