= 1987 Boston University Terriers football team =

American college football season

1987 Boston University Terriers football
- Conference: Yankee Conference
- Record: 3–8 (2–5 Yankee)
- Head coach: Steve Stetson (3rd season)
- Defensive coordinator: John Lyons (3rd season)
- Home stadium: Nickerson Field

1987 Yankee Conference football standings
	Conf.					Overall
Team	W		L		T	W		L		T
No. 13 Maine +^	6	–	1	–	0	8	–	4	–	0
No. 17 Richmond +^	6	–	1	–	0	7	–	5	–	0
Connecticut	5	–	2	–	0	7	–	4	–	0
New Hampshire	4	–	3	–	0	7	–	3	–	0
Delaware	2	–	5	–	0	5	–	6	–	0
UMass	2	–	5	–	0	3	–	8	–	0
Boston University	2	–	5	–	0	3	–	8	–	0
Rhode Island	1	–	6	–	0	1	–	10	–	0
+ – Conference co-champions; ^ – NCAA Division I-AA playoff participant; Rankings from NCAA Division I-AA Football Committee poll

The 1987 Boston University Terriers football team was an American football team that represented Boston University as a member of the Yankee Conference during the 1987 NCAA Division I-AA football season. In their third and final season under head coach Steve Stetson, the Terriers compiled a 3–8 record (2–5 against conference opponents), finished in a three-way tie for fifth place in the Yankee Conference, and were outscored by a total of 226 to 175.

== Schedule ==
Date	Opponent	Site	Result	Attendance	Source
September 12	at Indiana State*	Memorial Stadium; Terre Haute, IN	W 34–3		
September 19	New Hampshire	Nickerson Field; Boston, MA	L 20–27 ^{3OT}	2,868	
September 26	at No. T–4 Maine	Alumni Field; Orono, ME	L 19–33	10,000-12,000	
October 3	at Villanova*	Villanova Stadium; Villanova, PA	L 7–14	13,400	
October 10	Connecticut	Nickerson Field; Boston, MA	W 31–7	4,026	
October 17	Rhode Island	Nickerson Field; Boston, MA	W 16–13	11,552	
October 24	at UMass	Alumni Stadium; Hadley, MA	L 7–10	12,410	
October 29	No. 17 Richmond	Nickerson Field; Boston, MA	L 24–33		
November 7	The Citadel*	Nickerson Field; Boston, MA	L 7–34	2,103	
November 14	at Colgate*	Andy Kerr Stadium; Hamilton, NY	L 0–38	3,500	
November 21	at Delaware*	Delaware Stadium; Newark, DE	L 10–17 ^{OT}	14,145	
*Non-conference game; Rankings from NCAA Division I-AA Football Committee Poll released prior to the game
