= 1987 William & Mary Tribe football team =

American college football season

1987 William & Mary Tribe football
- Conference: Independent
- Record: 5–6
- Head coach: Jimmye Laycock (8th season)
- Captains: Joe Monaco; Dave Szydlik; Dave Wiley
- Home stadium: Cary Field

1987 NCAA Division I-AA independents football standings
	Conf.			Overall
Team	W	L	T	W		L		T
No. 6 Georgia Southern ^		–		9	–	4	–	0
No. 8 James Madison ^		–		9	–	3	–	0
No. 12 Arkansas State ^		–		8	–	4	–	1
No. 11 Western Kentucky ^		–		7	–	4	–	0
Villanova		–		6	–	4	–	0
Northeastern		–		6	–	5	–	0
Nicholls State		–		5	–	5	–	1
William & Mary		–		5	–	6	–	0
Towson State		–		4	–	6	–	0
Tennessee State		–		3	–	7	–	1
Lamar		–		3	–	8	–	0
Louisiana Tech		–		3	–	8	–	0
^ – NCAA Division I-AA playoff participant; Rankings from NCAA Division I-AA Football Committee poll

The 1987 William & Mary Tribe football team represented the College of William & Mary as an independent during the 1987 NCAA Division I-AA football season. Led by Jimmye Laycock in his eighth year as head coach, William & Mary finished the season with a record of 5–6.

== Schedule ==
Date	Opponent	Rank	Site	Result	Attendance	Source
September 5	at East Tennessee State	No. 17	Memorial Center; Johnson City, TN	L 25–49	7,615	
September 12	at Navy	No. 17	Navy–Marine Corps Memorial Stadium; Annapolis, MD	W 27–17		
September 19	at Colgate	No. 9	Andy Kerr Stadium; Hamilton, NY	L 7–19		
October 3	Lehigh		Cary Field; Williamsburg, VA	W 28–27	5,237	
October 10	at Yale		Yale Bowl; New Haven, CT	L 34–40	20,217	
October 17	Delaware		Cary Field; Williamsburg, VA (rivalry)	L 14–38	12,103	
October 24	No. 5 James Madison		Cary Field; Williamsburg, VA (rivalry)	L 22–28	16,103	
October 31	vs. VMI		Foreman Field; Norfolk, VA (Oyster Bowl, rivalry)	W 17–6	20,500	
November 7	Bucknell		Cary Field; Williamsburg, VA	W 31–6	5,680	
November 14	at No. 1 Holy Cross		Fitton Field; Worcester, MA	L 7–40	14,671	
November 21	No. 13 Richmond		Cary Field; Williamsburg, VA (I-64 Bowl)	W 20–7	10,209	
Rankings from NCAA Division I-AA Football Committee Poll released prior to the game
