= 1987 Maine Black Bears football team =

American college football season

1987 Maine Black Bears football

Yankee Conference co-champion

NCAA Division I-AA First Round, L 28–31 at Georgia Southern
- Conference: Yankee Conference
- Record: 8–4 (6–1 Yankee)
- Head coach: Tim Murphy (1st season)
- Defensive coordinator: John Lovett (3rd season)
- Captains: Bob Wilder; Steve Violette
- Home stadium: Alumni Field

1987 Yankee Conference football standings
	Conf.					Overall
Team	W		L		T	W		L		T
No. 13 Maine +^	6	–	1	–	0	8	–	4	–	0
No. 17 Richmond +^	6	–	1	–	0	7	–	5	–	0
Connecticut	5	–	2	–	0	7	–	4	–	0
New Hampshire	4	–	3	–	0	7	–	3	–	0
Delaware	2	–	5	–	0	5	–	6	–	0
UMass	2	–	5	–	0	3	–	8	–	0
Boston University	2	–	5	–	0	3	–	8	–	0
Rhode Island	1	–	6	–	0	1	–	10	–	0
+ – Conference co-champions; ^ – NCAA Division I-AA playoff participant; Rankings from NCAA Division I-AA Football Committee poll

The 1987 Maine Black Bears football team was an American football team that represented the University of Maine as a member of the Yankee Conference during the 1987 NCAA Division I-AA football season. In their first season under head coach Tim Murphy, the Black Bears compiled a 8–4 record (6–1 against conference opponents), tied for the Yankee Conference championship, and lost to Georgia Southern in the first round of the NCAA Division I-AA Football Championship playoffs. Bob Wilder and Steve Violette were the team captains.

== Schedule ==
Date	Opponent	Rank	Site	Result	Attendance	Source
September 5	American International*		Alumni Field; Orono, ME	W 42–23	7,213	
September 12	at UMass		McGuirk Stadium; Hadley, MA	W 31–14	11,242	
September 19	at Rhode Island	No. 6	Meade Stadium; Kingston, RI	W 24–20	6,858	
September 26	Boston University	No. T–4	Alumni Field; Orono, ME	W 33–19	10,000-12,000	
October 3	Towson State*	No. 3	Alumni Field; Orono, ME	L 14–17	1,755	
October 10	at Northeastern*	No. T–16	Parsons Field; Brookline, MA	L 17–21	5,100	
October 17	Richmond		Alumni Field; Orono, ME	L 7–17	8,053	
October 24	Connecticut		Alumni Field; Orono, ME	W 32–28		
October 31	at Delaware		Delaware Stadium; Newark, DE	W 59–56 ^{2OT}	15,766	
November 7	vs. No. 6 New Hampshire		Fitzpatrick Stadium; Portland, ME (rivalry)	W 28–14	10,196	
November 14	at Illinois State*	No. 17	Hancock Stadium; Normal, IL	W 37–34		
November 28	at No. 6 Georgia Southern*	No. 13	Paulson Stadium; Statesboro, GA (NCAA Division I-AA First Round)	L 28–31 ^{OT}	9,440	
*Non-conference game; Rankings from NCAA Division I-AA Football Committee Poll released prior to the game

== After the season ==
The following Black Bear was selected in the 1988 NFL Draft after the season.

Round	Pick	Player	Position	NFL club
6	160	Rob Sterling	Defensive back	Philadelphia Eagles
