= 1987 Georgia Southern Eagles football team =

American college football season

1987 Georgia Southern Eagles football

NCAA Division I-AA Quarterfinal, L 0–19 at Appalachian State
- Conference: Independent
- Record: 9–4
- Head coach: Erk Russell (6th season)
- Home stadium: Paulson Stadium

1987 NCAA Division I-AA independents football standings
	Conf.			Overall
Team	W	L	T	W		L		T
No. 6 Georgia Southern ^		–		9	–	4	–	0
No. 8 James Madison ^		–		9	–	3	–	0
No. 12 Arkansas State ^		–		8	–	4	–	1
No. 11 Western Kentucky ^		–		7	–	4	–	0
Villanova		–		6	–	4	–	0
Northeastern		–		6	–	5	–	0
Nicholls State		–		5	–	5	–	1
Florida A&M		–		5	–	5	–	1
William & Mary		–		5	–	6	–	0
Towson State		–		4	–	6	–	0
Tennessee State		–		3	–	7	–	1
Lamar		–		3	–	8	–	0
Louisiana Tech		–		3	–	8	–	0
^ – NCAA Division I-AA playoff participant; Rankings from NCAA Division I-AA Football Committee poll

The 1987 Georgia Southern Eagles football team represented the Georgia Southern Eagles of Georgia Southern College (now known as Georgia Southern University) during the 1987 NCAA Division I-AA football season. The Eagles played their home games at Paulson Stadium in Statesboro, Georgia. The team was coached by Erk Russell, in his sixth year as head coach for the Eagles.

== Schedule ==
Date	Opponent	Rank	Site	Result	Attendance	Source
September 5	Catawba	No. 1	Paulson Stadium; Statesboro, GA	W 27–0	9,128	
September 12	vs. Florida A&M	No. 1	Gator Bowl; Jacksonville, FL (Bold City Classic)	L 14–17	17,268	
September 19	No. 5 Middle Tennessee		Paulson Stadium; Statesboro, GA	W 17–13	4,527	
September 26	at East Carolina	No. 10	Ficklen Memorial Stadium; Greenville, NC	L 13–16	27,411	
October 3	No. 8 (D-II) UCF	No. 13	Paulson Stadium; Statesboro, GA	W 34–32	15,540	
October 10	vs. Bethune–Cookman	No. T–7	Gator Bowl; Jacksonville, FL	W 14–13	5,100	
October 17	at No. T–6 Northeast Louisiana	No. 8	Malone Stadium; Monroe, LA	L 17–26	17,231	
October 24	at No. 8 Western Carolina	No. 20	E. J. Whitmire Stadium; Cullowhee, NC	W 37–16	13,460	
October 31	No. 7 Western Kentucky	No. 13	Paulson Stadium; Statesboro, GA	W 23–20	13,066	
November 7	No. 3 James Madison	No. 12	Paulson Stadium; Statesboro, GA	W 26–7	16,734	
November 21	at South Carolina State	No. 6	Oliver C. Dawson Stadium; Orangeburg, SC	W 30–13	10,048	
November 28	No. 13 Maine	No. 6	Paulson Stadium; Statesboro, GA (NCAA Division I-AA First Round)	W 31–28 ^{OT}	9,440	
December 5	at No. 2 Appalachian State*	No. 6	Conrad Stadium; Boone, NC (NCAA Division I-AA Quarterfinal)	L 0–19	9,229	
*Non-conference game; Rankings from NCAA Division I-AA Football Committee Poll released prior to the game
