= 1987 New Hampshire Wildcats football team =

American college football season

1987 New Hampshire Wildcats football
- Conference: Yankee Conference
- Record: 7–4 (4–3 Yankee)
- Head coach: Bill Bowes (16th season)
- Offensive coordinator: Mark Whipple (2nd season)
- Home stadium: Cowell Stadium

1987 Yankee Conference football standings
	Conf.					Overall
Team	W		L		T	W		L		T
No. 13 Maine +^	6	–	1	–	0	8	–	4	–	0
No. 17 Richmond +^	6	–	1	–	0	7	–	5	–	0
Connecticut	5	–	2	–	0	7	–	4	–	0
New Hampshire	4	–	3	–	0	7	–	3	–	0
Delaware	2	–	5	–	0	5	–	6	–	0
UMass	2	–	5	–	0	3	–	8	–	0
Boston University	2	–	5	–	0	3	–	8	–	0
Rhode Island	1	–	6	–	0	1	–	10	–	0
+ – Conference co-champions; ^ – NCAA Division I-AA playoff participant; Rankings from NCAA Division I-AA Football Committee poll

The 1987 New Hampshire Wildcats football team was an American football team that represented the University of New Hampshire as a member of the Yankee Conference during the 1987 NCAA Division I-AA football season. In its 16th year under head coach Bill Bowes, the team compiled a 7–4 record (4–3 against conference opponents) and finished fourth out of eight teams in the Yankee Conference.

== Schedule ==
Date	Opponent	Rank	Site	Result	Attendance	Source
September 5	Richmond	No. 19	Cowell Stadium; Durham, NH	L 7–14	8,025	
September 19	at Boston University		Nickerson Field; Boston, MA	W 27–20 ^{3OT}	2,868	
September 26	Dartmouth*		Cowell Stadium; Durham, NH (rivalry)	W 41–3	10,207	
October 3	Delaware		Cowell Stadium; Durham, NH	W 45–21	6,826	
October 17	Northeastern*	No. 10	Cowell Stadium; Durham, NH	W 24–16		
October 24	Lafayette*	No. 8	Cowell Stadium; Durham, NH	W 21–19	8,455	
October 31	at Rhode Island	No. 6	Meade Stadium; Kingston, RI	W 28–14	11,231	
November 7	vs. Maine	No. 6	Fitzpatrick Stadium; Portland, ME (rivalry)	L 14–28	10,196	
November 14	UMass	No. 18	Cowell Stadium; Durham, NH (rivalry)	W 17–10	6,580	
November 21	at Connecticut	No. T–16	Memorial Stadium; Storrs, CT	L 21–31	2,616	
*Non-conference game; Rankings from NCAA Division I-AA Football Committee Poll released prior to the game
