= 1987 Delaware Fightin' Blue Hens football team =

American college football season

1987 Delaware Fightin' Blue Hens football
- Conference: Yankee Conference
- Record: 5–6 (2–5 Yankee)
- Head coach: Tubby Raymond (22nd season)
- Offensive coordinator: Ted Kempski (20th season)
- Offensive scheme: Delaware Wing-T
- Base defense: 5–2
- Home stadium: Delaware Stadium

1987 Yankee Conference football standings
	Conf.					Overall
Team	W		L		T	W		L		T
No. 13 Maine +^	6	–	1	–	0	8	–	4	–	0
No. 17 Richmond +^	6	–	1	–	0	7	–	5	–	0
Connecticut	5	–	2	–	0	7	–	4	–	0
New Hampshire	4	–	3	–	0	7	–	3	–	0
Delaware	2	–	5	–	0	5	–	6	–	0
UMass	2	–	5	–	0	3	–	8	–	0
Boston University	2	–	5	–	0	3	–	8	–	0
Rhode Island	1	–	6	–	0	1	–	10	–	0
+ – Conference co-champions; ^ – NCAA Division I-AA playoff participant; Rankings from NCAA Division I-AA Football Committee poll

The 1987 Delaware Fightin' Blue Hens football team represented the University of Delaware as a member of the Yankee Conference during the 1987 NCAA Division I-AA football season. Led by 22nd-year head coach Tubby Raymond, the Fightin' Blue Hens compiled an overall record of 5–6 with a mark of 2–5 in conference play, placing in a three-way tie for fifth in the Yankee Conference. The team played home games at Delaware Stadium in Newark, Delaware.

== Schedule ==
Date	Opponent	Site	Result	Attendance	Source
September 12	at Rhode Island	Meade Stadium; Kingston, RI	L 13–26	7,028	
September 19	No. 4 (D-II) West Chester*	Delaware Stadium; Newark, DE (rivalry)	W 28–21	20,018	
September 26	No. 16 Richmond	Delaware Stadium; Newark, DE	L 21–28	22,160	
October 3	at New Hampshire	Cowell Stadium; Durham, NH	L 21–45	6,826	
October 10	UMass^{†}	Delaware Stadium; Newark, DE	W 37–34	21,764	
October 17	at William & Mary*	Cary Field; Williamsburg, VA (rivalry)	W 38–14	12,103	
October 24	at Lehigh*	Taylor Stadium; Bethlehem, PA (rivalry)	W 28–24	14,100	
October 31	Maine	Delaware Stadium; Newark, DE	L 56–59 ^{2OT}	15,766	
November 7	at Connecticut	Memorial Stadium; Storrs, CT	L 19–20	3,498	
November 14	Navy*	Delaware Stadium; Newark, DE	L 22–31	23,100	
November 21	Boston University	Delaware Stadium; Newark, DE	W 17–10 ^{OT}	14,145	
*Non-conference game; ^{†}Homecoming; Rankings from NCAA Division I-AA Football Committee Poll released prior to the game
