= 1987 Southern Jaguars football team =

American college football season

1987 Southern Jaguars football
- Conference: Southwestern Athletic Conference
- Record: 7–4 (5–2 SWAC)
- Head coach: Marino Casem (1st season)
- Home stadium: A. W. Mumford Stadium

1987 Southwestern Athletic Conference football standings
	Conf.					Overall
Team	W		L		T	W		L		T
No. 9 Jackson State $^	7	–	0	–	0	8	–	3	–	1
Southern	5	–	2	–	0	7	–	4	–	0
Alcorn State	5	–	2	–	0	6	–	3	–	0
Alabama State	4	–	3	–	0	8	–	3	–	0
Grambling State	3	–	4	–	0	5	–	6	–	0
Texas Southern	3	–	4	–	0	5	–	6	–	0
Prairie View A&M	1	–	6	–	0	3	–	8	–	0
Mississippi Valley State	0	–	7	–	0	1	–	10	–	0
$ – Conference champion; ^ – NCAA Division I-AA playoff participant; Rankings from NCAA Division I-AA Football Committee poll

The 1987 Southern Jaguars football team represented Southern University as a member of the Southwestern Athletic Conference (SWAC) during the 1987 NCAA Division I-AA football season. Led by first-year head coach Marino Casem, the Jaguars compiled an overall record of 7–4, with a conference record of 5–2, and finished tied for second in the SWAC.

== Schedule ==
Date	Opponent	Rank	Site	Result	Attendance	Source
September 12	vs. Alabama State		Ladd Stadium; Mobile, AL (Gulf Coast Classic)	W 14–10	15,000	
September 19	Texas Southern	No. 20	A. W. Mumford Stadium; Baton Rouge, LA	W 33–13		
September 26	vs. Prairie View A&M	No. 20	Cotton Bowl; Dallas, TX	W 14–0		
October 3	at Mississippi Valley State	No. 16	Magnolia Stadium; Itta Bena, MS	W 17–14		
October 10	Nicholls State*^{†}	No. T–7	A. W. Mumford Stadium; Baton Rouge, LA	L 21–27		
October 17	at No. 5 Jackson State	No. 17	Mississippi Veterans Memorial Stadium; Jackson, MS (rivalry)	L 0–14	43,000	
October 24	Alcorn State		A. W. Mumford Stadium; Baton Rouge, LA	L 17–19		
October 31	Tennessee State*		A. W. Mumford Stadium; Baton Rouge, LA	W 14–7	16,000	
November 7	at Florida A&M*		Bragg Memorial Stadium; Tallahassee, FL	L 17–24	27,085	
November 21	Southwest Missouri State*		A. W. Mumford Stadium; Baton Rouge, LA	W 8–6		
November 28	vs. Grambling State		Louisiana Superdome; New Orleans, LA (Bayou Classic)	W 27–21		
*Non-conference game; ^{†}Homecoming; Rankings from NCAA Division I-AA Football Committee Poll released prior to the game
