= 1987 Delaware State Hornets football team =

American college football season

1987 Delaware State Hornets football

MEAC champion
- Conference: Mid-Eastern Athletic Conference
- Record: 9–1 (5–0 MEAC)
- Head coach: Bill Collick (3rd season)
- Home stadium: Alumni Stadium

1987 Mid-Eastern Athletic Conference football standings
	Conf.					Overall
Team	W		L		T	W		L		T
No. 20 Delaware State $	5	–	0	–	0	9	–	1	–	0
No. 18 Howard	4	–	1	–	0	8	–	2	–	0
South Carolina State	3	–	2	–	0	6	–	5	–	0
Bethune–Cookman	2	–	3	–	0	4	–	7	–	0
North Carolina A&T	1	–	4	–	0	3	–	8	–	0
Morgan State	0	–	5	–	0	1	–	9	–	0
Florida A&M	0	–	0	–	0	5	–	5	–	1
$ – Conference champion; Florida A&M games did not count as conference games in 1987; records adjusted for Howard and Arkansas Pine–Bluff forfeits to Delaware State; Rankings from NCAA Division I-AA Football Committee poll

The 1987 Delaware State Hornets football team represented Delaware State College (now known as Delaware State University) as a member of the Mid-Eastern Athletic Conference (MEAC) during the 1987 NCAA Division I-AA football season. Led by third-year head coach Bill Collick, the Hornets compiled an overall record of 9–1, with a mark of 5–0 in conference play, and finished as MEAC champion.

== Schedule ==
Date	Opponent	Rank	Site	Result	Attendance	Source
September 5	at Boise State*		Bronco Stadium; Boise, ID	L 13–34	18,101	
September 19	Morgan State		Alumni Stadium; Dover, DE	W 30–7	3,200	
September 26	at District of Columbia*		Eastern Stadium; Washington, D.C.	W 69–14		
October 3	Bethune–Cookman		Alumni Stadium; Dover, DE	W 45–0		
October 17	at Akron*	No. 16	Rubber Bowl; Akron, OH	W 52–26	9,491	
October 24	at Towson State*	No. 13	Minnegan Stadium; Towson, MD	W 40–17	4,520	
October 31	at South Carolina State	No. 11	Oliver C. Dawson Stadium; Orangeburg, SC	W 28–7	6,143	
November 7	North Carolina A&T	No. 9	Alumni Stadium; Dover, DE	W 41–9	7,522	
November 14	at Arkansas–Pine Bluff*	No. 7	Pumphrey Stadium; Pine Bluff, AR	W 20–22 (UAPB forfeit)		
November 21	Howard	No. 14	Alumni Stadium; Dover, DE	W 7–12 (Howard forfeit)		
*Non-conference game; Rankings from NCAA Division I-AA Football Committee Poll released prior to the game
