= 1987 Jackson State Tigers football team =

American college football season

1987 Jackson State Tigers football

SWAC champion

NCAA Division I-AA First Round, L 32–35 vs. Arkansas State
- Conference: Southwestern Athletic Conference
- Record: 8–3–1 (7–0 SWAC)
- Head coach: W. C. Gorden (12th season)
- Home stadium: Mississippi Veterans Memorial Stadium

1987 Southwestern Athletic Conference football standings
	Conf.					Overall
Team	W		L		T	W		L		T
No. 9 Jackson State $^	7	–	0	–	0	8	–	3	–	1
Southern	5	–	2	–	0	7	–	4	–	0
Alcorn State	5	–	2	–	0	6	–	3	–	0
Alabama State	4	–	3	–	0	8	–	3	–	0
Grambling State	3	–	4	–	0	5	–	6	–	0
Texas Southern	3	–	4	–	0	5	–	6	–	0
Prairie View A&M	1	–	6	–	0	3	–	8	–	0
Mississippi Valley State	0	–	7	–	0	1	–	10	–	0
$ – Conference champion; ^ – NCAA Division I-AA playoff participant; Rankings from NCAA Division I-AA Football Committee poll

The 1987 Jackson State Tigers football team represented Jackson State University as a member of the Southwestern Athletic Conference (SWAC) during the 1987 NCAA Division I-AA football season. Led by 12th-year head coach W. C. Gorden, the Tigers compiled an overall record of 8–3–1 and a mark of 7–0 in conference play, and finished as SWAC champion. Jackson State finished their season with a loss against Arkansas State in the Division I-AA playoffs.

== Schedule ==
Date	Opponent	Rank	Site	Result	Attendance	Source
September 12	vs. Tennessee State*	No. 11	Liberty Bowl Memorial Stadium; Memphis, TN (rivalry)	T 17–17	26,853	
September 19	at Prairie View A&M		Rice Stadium; Houston, TX	W 16–12	4,000	
September 26	Mississippi Valley State	No. 15	Mississippi Veterans Memorial Stadium; Jackson, MS	W 46–0		
October 3	North Carolina Central*	No. 9	Mississippi Veterans Memorial Stadium; Jackson, MS	W 10–9		
October 10	Alabama State	No. 6	Mississippi Veterans Memorial Stadium; Jackson, MS	W 41–17	33,500	
October 17	Southern	No. 5	Mississippi Veterans Memorial Stadium; Jackson, MS (rivalry)	W 14–0	43,000	
October 24	Grambling State	No. 4	Mississippi Veterans Memorial Stadium; Jackson, MS	W 31–17	39,000	
October 31	at Southern Miss*	No. 4	M. M. Roberts Stadium; Hattiesburg, MS	L 7–17	33,687	
November 7	at Texas Southern	No. 5	Rice Stadium; Houston, TX	W 33–14		
November 14	at Northwestern State*	No. 4	Harry Turpin Stadium; Natchitoches, LA	L 24–26		
November 21	Alcorn State	No. 10	Mississippi Veterans Memorial Stadium; Jackson, MS (rivalry)	W 19–10		
November 28	No. 12 Arkansas State*	No. 9	Mississippi Veterans Memorial Stadium; Jackson, MS (NCAA Division I-AA First Round)	L 32–35	7,500	
*Non-conference game; Rankings from NCAA Division I-AA Football Committee Poll released prior to the game
