= 1987 Richmond Spiders football team =

American college football season

1987 Richmond Spiders football

Yankee co-champion

NCAA Division I-AA first round, L 3–20 at Appalachian State
- Conference: Yankee Conference
- Record: 7–5 (6–1 Yankee)
- Head coach: Dal Shealy (8th season)
- Home stadium: UR Stadium

1987 Yankee Conference football standings
	Conf.					Overall
Team	W		L		T	W		L		T
No. 13 Maine +^	6	–	1	–	0	8	–	4	–	0
No. 17 Richmond +^	6	–	1	–	0	7	–	5	–	0
Connecticut	5	–	2	–	0	7	–	4	–	0
New Hampshire	4	–	3	–	0	7	–	3	–	0
Delaware	2	–	5	–	0	5	–	6	–	0
UMass	2	–	5	–	0	3	–	8	–	0
Boston University	2	–	5	–	0	3	–	8	–	0
Rhode Island	1	–	6	–	0	1	–	10	–	0
+ – Conference co-champions; ^ – NCAA Division I-AA playoff participant; Rankings from NCAA Division I-AA Football Committee poll

The 1987 Richmond Spiders football team was an American football team that represented the University of Richmond as a member of the Yankee Conference during the 1987 NCAA Division I-AA football season. In their eighth season under head coach Dal Shealy, Richmond compiled a 7–5 record, with a mark of 6–1 in conference play, finishing as Yankee co-champions. In the I-AA playoffs, the Spiders were defeated by Appalachian State in the first round.

== Schedule ==
Date	Opponent	Rank	Site	Result	Attendance	Source
September 5	at No. 19 New Hampshire		Cowell Stadium; Durham, NH	W 14–7	8,025	
September 12	at Wake Forest*		Groves Stadium; Winston-Salem, NC	L 0–24	14,250	
September 19	UMass		UR Stadium; Richmond, VA	W 52–51 ^{4OT}	15,202	
September 26	at Delaware	No. 16	Delaware Stadium; Newark, DE	W 28–21	22,160	
October 3	Connecticut	No. T–9	UR Stadium; Richmond, VA	L 14–21	8,966	
October 10	at No. 9 James Madison*		JMU Stadium; Harrisonburg, VA (rivalry)	L 3–41	16,030	
October 17	at Maine		Alumni Field; Orono, ME	W 17–7	8,053	
October 24	Rhode Island	No. 19	UR Stadium; Richmond, VA	W 27–14	17,029	
October 29	at Boston University	No. 17	Nickerson Field; Boston, MA	W 33–24		
November 14	Villanova*	No. 15	UR Stadium; Richmond, VA	W 38–35	17,868	
November 21	at William & Mary*	No. 13	Cary Field; Williamsburg, VA (rivalry)	L 7–20	10,209	
November 28	at No. 2 Appalachian State*	No. 17	Conrad Stadium; Boone, NC (NCAA Division I-AA First Round)	L 3–20	4,138	
*Non-conference game; Rankings from NCAA Division I-AA Football Committee Poll released prior to the game
