= 1987 UMass Minutemen football team =

American college football season

1987 UMass Minutemen football
- Conference: Yankee Conference
- Record: 3–8 (2–5 Yankee)
- Head coach: Jim Reid (2nd season)
- Home stadium: Warren McGuirk Alumni Stadium

1987 Yankee Conference football standings
	Conf.					Overall
Team	W		L		T	W		L		T
No. 13 Maine +^	6	–	1	–	0	8	–	4	–	0
No. 17 Richmond +^	6	–	1	–	0	7	–	5	–	0
Connecticut	5	–	2	–	0	7	–	4	–	0
New Hampshire	4	–	3	–	0	7	–	3	–	0
Delaware	2	–	5	–	0	5	–	6	–	0
UMass	2	–	5	–	0	3	–	8	–	0
Boston University	2	–	5	–	0	3	–	8	–	0
Rhode Island	1	–	6	–	0	1	–	10	–	0
+ – Conference co-champions; ^ – NCAA Division I-AA playoff participant; Rankings from NCAA Division I-AA Football Committee poll

The 1987 UMass Minutemen football team represented the University of Massachusetts Amherst in the 1987 NCAA Division I-AA football season as a member of the Yankee Conference. The team was coached by Jim Reid and played its home games at Warren McGuirk Alumni Stadium in Hadley, Massachusetts. UMass finished the season with a record of 3–8 overall and 2–5 in conference play.

== Schedule ==
Date	Opponent	Site	Result	Attendance	Source
September 12	Maine	McGuirk Stadium; Hadley, MA	L 14–31	11,242	
September 19	at Richmond	UR Stadium; Richmond, VA	L 51–52 ^{4OT}	15,202	
September 26	James Madison*	McGuirk Stadium; Hadley, MA	L 15–21	10,303	
October 3	Rhode Island	McGuirk Stadium; Hadley, MA	W 42–7	9,801	
October 10	at Delaware	Delaware Stadium; Newark, DE	L 34–37	21,764	
October 17	at Connecticut	Memorial Stadium; Storrs, CT (rivalry)	L 17–21	8,013	
October 24	at Boston University	McGuirk Stadium; Hadley, MA	W 10–7	12,410	
October 31	Holy Cross*	McGuirk Stadium; Hadley, MA	L 10–54	15,214	
November 7	at Villanova*	Villanova Stadium; Villanova, PA	L 27–44	13,400	
November 14	at New Hampshire	Cowell Stadium; Durham, NH (rivalry)	L 10–17	6,580	
November 21	at Northeastern*	Parsons Field; Brookline, MA	W 27–7	3,830	
*Non-conference game
