= 1987 North Carolina A&T Aggies football team =

American college football season

1987 North Carolina A&T Aggies football
- Conference: Mid-Eastern Athletic Conference
- Record: 3–8 (1–4 MEAC)
- Head coach: Mo Forte (6th season)
- Home stadium: Aggie Stadium

1987 Mid-Eastern Athletic Conference football standings
	Conf.					Overall
Team	W		L		T	W		L		T
No. 20 Delaware State $	5	–	0	–	0	9	–	1	–	0
No. 18 Howard	4	–	1	–	0	8	–	2	–	0
South Carolina State	3	–	2	–	0	6	–	5	–	0
Bethune–Cookman	2	–	3	–	0	4	–	7	–	0
North Carolina A&T	1	–	4	–	0	3	–	8	–	0
Morgan State	0	–	5	–	0	1	–	9	–	0
$ – Conference champion; Records adjusted for Howard and Arkansas Pine–Bluff forfeits to Delaware State; Rankings from NCAA Division I-AA Football Committee poll

The 1987 North Carolina A&T Aggies football team represented North Carolina A&T State University as a member of the Mid-Eastern Athletic Conference (MEAC) during the 1987 NCAA Division I-AA football season. Led by sixth-year head coach Mo Forte, the Aggies compiled an overall record of 3–8, with a mark of 1–4 in conference play.

== Schedule ==
Date	Opponent	Rank	Site	Result	Attendance	Source
September 12	at Winston-Salem State*		Bowman Gray Stadium; Winston-Salem, NC	W 24–10		
September 19	at South Carolina State		Oliver C. Dawson Stadium; Orangeburg, SC (rivalry)	L 0–12		
September 26	Morgan State		Aggie Stadium; Greensboro, NC	W 35–17		
October 3	Norfolk State		Aggie Stadium; Greensboro, NC	L 17–20	10,000	
October 10	Johnson C. Smith*		Aggie Stadium; Greensboro, NC	W 19–8		
October 17	Western Carolina*	No. 12	E. J. Whitmire Stadium; Cullowhee, NC	L 34–55		
October 24	Howard		Aggie Stadium; Greensboro, NC	L 21–34	10,500	
October 31	at Bethune–Cookman		Welch Memorial Stadium; Daytona Beach, FL	L 36–38		
November 7	at No. 9 Delaware State		Alumni Stadium; Dover, DE	L 9–41	7,522	
November 14	North Carolina Central*		Aggie Stadium; Greensboro, NC (rivalry)	L 19–38	20,000	
November 21	No. 12 Western Kentucky*		Aggie Stadium; Greensboro, NC	L 27–45	2,500	
*Non-conference game; Rankings from NCAA Division I-AA Football Committee Poll released prior to the game
