= 1987 NCAA Division I-AA football season =

American college football season

1987 NCAA Division I-AA season

Regular season
- Number of teams: 87
- Duration: August–November
- Payton Award: Kenny Gamble (RB, Colgate)

Playoff
- Duration: November 28–December 19
- Championship date: December 19, 1987
- Championship site: Minidome; Pocatello, Idaho
- Champion: Northeast Louisiana

NCAA Division I-AA football seasons
- «1986 1988»

The 1987 NCAA Division I-AA football season, part of college football in the United States organized by the National Collegiate Athletic Association at the Division I-AA level, began in August 1987, and concluded with the 1987 NCAA Division I-AA Football Championship Game on December 19, 1987, at the Minidome in Pocatello, Idaho. The Northeast Louisiana Indians won their first I-AA championship, defeating the Marshall Thundering Herd by a score of 43–42.

== Conference changes and new programs ==
- The Gulf Star Conference folded after the 1986 season when four of its founding members, Northwestern State, Sam Houston State, Southwest Texas State, and Stephen F. Austin, joined the Southland Conference. The Gulf Star's remaining football member, Nicholls State, opted to become an Independent. Three former Southland Conference members, Arkansas State, Lamar, and Louisiana Tech, moved to DI-AA Independent status after joining the newly formed (non-football) American South Conference as charter members.

School	1986 Conference	1987 Conference
Akron	Ohio Valley (I-AA)	Independent (I-A)
Arkansas State	Southland	I-AA Independent
Davidson	Southern	Colonial (I-AA)
Eastern Washington	I-AA Independent	Big Sky
Lamar	Southland	I-AA Independent
Louisiana Tech	Southland	I-AA Independent
Nicholls State	Gulf Star	I-AA Independent
Northwestern State	Gulf Star	Southland
Sam Houston State	Gulf Star	Southland
Southwest Texas State	Gulf Star	Southland
Stephen F. Austin	Gulf Star	Southland
Towson State	D-II Independent	I-AA Independent
Villanova	Revived Program+	I-AA Independent

+ "unclassified" for 1985 (partial season) and 1986 (full season)

== Conference standings ==
1987 Big Sky Conference football standings
	Conf.					Overall
Team	W		L		T	W		L		T
No. 5 Idaho $^	7	–	1	–	0	9	–	3	–	0
No. 10 Weber State ^	7	–	1	–	0	10	–	3	–	0
Montana	5	–	3	–	0	6	–	5	–	0
Boise State	4	–	4	–	0	6	–	5	–	0
Nevada	4	–	4	–	0	5	–	6	–	0
Northern Arizona	4	–	4	–	0	7	–	4	–	0
Idaho State	3	–	5	–	0	3	–	7	–	1
Eastern Washington	2	–	6	–	0	4	–	7	–	0
Montana State	0	–	8	–	0	1	–	10	–	0
$ – Conference champion; ^ – NCAA Division I-AA playoff participant; Rankings from NCAA Division I-AA Poll

1987 Colonial League football standings
	Conf.					Overall
Team	W		L		T	W		L		T
No. 1 Holy Cross $	4	–	0	–	0	11	–	0	–	0
Lehigh	3	–	1	–	1	5	–	5	–	1
Colgate	2	–	2	–	0	7	–	4	–	0
Lafayette	2	–	3	–	0	4	–	7	–	0
Bucknell	1	–	3	–	1	4	–	5	–	1
Davidson	0	–	3	–	0	1	–	10	–	0
$ – Conference champion; Rankings from NCAA Division I-AA Football Committee poll

1987 Gateway Collegiate Athletic Conference football standings
	Conf.					Overall
Team	W		L		T	W		L		T
No. 4 Northern Iowa $^	6	–	0	–	0	10	–	4	–	0
Western Illinois	5	–	1	–	0	7	–	4	–	0
Eastern Illinois	3	–	3	–	0	5	–	6	–	0
SW Missouri State	3	–	3	–	0	5	–	6	–	0
Indiana State	2	–	4	–	0	5	–	6	–	0
Southern Illinois	2	–	4	–	0	3	–	8	–	0
Illinois State	0	–	6	–	0	3	–	7	–	0
$ – Conference champion; ^ – NCAA Division I-AA playoff participant; Rankings from NCAA Division I-AA Football Committee poll

1987 Ivy League football standings
	Conf.					Overall
Team	W		L		T	W		L		T
Harvard $	6	–	1	–	0	8	–	2	–	0
Brown	5	–	2	–	0	7	–	3	–	0
Yale	5	–	2	–	0	7	–	3	–	0
Princeton	4	–	3	–	0	6	–	4	–	0
Cornell	4	–	3	–	0	5	–	5	–	0
Penn	3	–	4	–	0	4	–	6	–	0
Dartmouth	1	–	6	–	0	2	–	8	–	0
Columbia	0	–	7	–	0	0	–	10	–	0
$ – Conference champion

1987 Mid-Eastern Athletic Conference football standings
	Conf.					Overall
Team	W		L		T	W		L		T
No. 20 Delaware State $	5	–	0	–	0	9	–	1	–	0
No. 18 Howard	4	–	1	–	0	8	–	2	–	0
South Carolina State	3	–	2	–	0	6	–	5	–	0
Bethune–Cookman	2	–	3	–	0	4	–	7	–	0
North Carolina A&T	1	–	4	–	0	3	–	8	–	0
Morgan State	0	–	5	–	0	1	–	9	–	0
Florida A&M	0	–	0	–	0	5	–	5	–	1
$ – Conference champion; Florida A&M games did not count as conference games in 1987; records adjusted for Howard and Arkansas Pine–Bluff forfeits to Delaware State; Rankings from NCAA Division I-AA Football Committee poll

1987 Ohio Valley Conference football standings
	Conf.					Overall
Team	W		L		T	W		L		T
No. 7 Eastern Kentucky +^	5	–	1	–	0	9	–	3	–	0
No. 15 Youngstown State +^	5	–	1	–	0	8	–	4	–	0
Middle Tennessee	4	–	2	–	0	6	–	5	–	0
Murray State	3	–	3	–	0	6	–	5	–	0
Tennessee Tech	2	–	4	–	0	5	–	6	–	0
Morehead State	1	–	5	–	0	2	–	8	–	0
Austin Peay	1	–	5	–	0	2	–	9	–	0
+ – Conference co-champions; ^ – NCAA Division I-AA playoff participant; Rankings from NCAA Division I-AA Football Committee poll

1987 Southern Conference football standings
	Conf.					Overall
Team	W		L		T	W		L		T
No. 2 Appalachian State $^	7	–	0	–	0	11	–	3	–	0
No. 14 Marshall ^	4	–	2	–	0	10	–	5	–	0
Furman	4	–	3	–	0	7	–	4	–	0
Chattanooga	4	–	3	–	0	6	–	5	–	0
VMI	2	–	4	–	0	4	–	7	–	0
Western Carolina	2	–	4	–	0	4	–	7	–	0
East Tennessee State	2	–	5	–	0	5	–	6	–	0
The Citadel	1	–	5	–	0	4	–	7	–	0
$ – Conference champion; ^ – NCAA Division I-AA playoff participant; Rankings from NCAA Division I-AA Football Committee poll

1987 Southland Conference football standings
	Conf.					Overall
Team	W		L		T	W		L		T
No. 3 Northeast Louisiana $^	6	–	0	–	0	13	–	2	–	0
No. 19 Sam Houston State	5	–	1	–	0	8	–	3	–	0
No. 16 North Texas State ^	5	–	1	–	0	7	–	5	–	0
Northwestern State	3	–	3	–	0	6	–	5	–	0
SW Texas State	2	–	4	–	0	4	–	7	–	0
Stephen F. Austin	1	–	5	–	0	3	–	7	–	1
McNeese State	1	–	5	–	0	2	–	9	–	0
$ – Conference champion; ^ – NCAA Division I-AA playoff participant; Northeast Louisiana's games against Louisiana Tech and Arkansas State, Sam Houston State's games against Texas Southern and Western Illinois, Stephen F. Austin's game against Nicholls State, and McNeese State's game against Louisiana Tech counted in the conference standings.; Rankings from NCAA Division I-AA Football Committee poll

1987 Southwestern Athletic Conference football standings
	Conf.					Overall
Team	W		L		T	W		L		T
No. 9 Jackson State $^	7	–	0	–	0	8	–	3	–	1
Southern	5	–	2	–	0	7	–	4	–	0
Alcorn State	5	–	2	–	0	6	–	3	–	0
Alabama State	4	–	3	–	0	8	–	3	–	0
Grambling State	3	–	4	–	0	5	–	6	–	0
Texas Southern	3	–	4	–	0	5	–	6	–	0
Prairie View A&M	1	–	6	–	0	3	–	8	–	0
Mississippi Valley State	0	–	7	–	0	1	–	10	–	0
$ – Conference champion; ^ – NCAA Division I-AA playoff participant; Rankings from NCAA Division I-AA Football Committee poll

1987 Yankee Conference football standings
	Conf.					Overall
Team	W		L		T	W		L		T
No. 13 Maine +^	6	–	1	–	0	8	–	4	–	0
No. 17 Richmond +^	6	–	1	–	0	7	–	5	–	0
Connecticut	5	–	2	–	0	7	–	4	–	0
New Hampshire	4	–	3	–	0	7	–	3	–	0
Delaware	2	–	5	–	0	5	–	6	–	0
UMass	2	–	5	–	0	3	–	8	–	0
Boston University	2	–	5	–	0	3	–	8	–	0
Rhode Island	1	–	6	–	0	1	–	10	–	0
+ – Conference co-champions; ^ – NCAA Division I-AA playoff participant; Rankings from NCAA Division I-AA Football Committee poll

1987 NCAA Division I-AA independents football standings
	Conf.			Overall
Team	W	L	T	W		L		T
No. 6 Georgia Southern ^		–		9	–	4	–	0
No. 8 James Madison ^		–		9	–	3	–	0
No. 12 Arkansas State ^		–		8	–	4	–	1
No. 11 Western Kentucky ^		–		7	–	4	–	0
Villanova		–		6	–	4	–	0
Northeastern		–		6	–	5	–	0
Nicholls State		–		5	–	5	–	1
William & Mary		–		5	–	6	–	0
Towson State		–		4	–	6	–	0
Tennessee State		–		3	–	7	–	1
Lamar		–		3	–	8	–	0
Louisiana Tech		–		3	–	8	–	0
^ – NCAA Division I-AA playoff participant; Rankings from NCAA Division I-AA Football Committee poll

== Conference champions ==
Conference Champions

Big Sky Conference – Idaho
Colonial League – Holy Cross
Gateway Collegiate Athletic Conference – Northern Iowa
Ivy League – Harvard
Mid-Eastern Athletic Conference – Howard
Ohio Valley Conference – Eastern Kentucky and Youngstown State
Southern Conference – Appalachian State
Southland Conference – Northeast Louisiana
Southwestern Athletic Conference – Jackson State
Yankee Conference – Richmond

== Postseason ==
The playoff bracket of sixteen teams had four seeded teams; Appalachian State, Northeast Louisiana, Northern Iowa, and Idaho were first through fourth, respectively. Undefeated and top-ranked Holy Cross, featuring Heisman Trophy candidate Gordie Lockbaum, did not participate in the postseason, per the rules of their conference, the Colonial League (known as the Patriot League since 1990).

The Mid-Eastern Athletic Conference (MEAC) conference champion Howard Bison (9–1) did not receive an invitation to the I-AA playoffs and filed a lawsuit against the NCAA and sought a temporary restraining order to delay the start of the playoffs. The lawsuit asserted "unlawful and racially motivated reasons" for the team being passed over. Two days later, the request for a temporary restraining order was rejected by federal judge John Garrett Penn. Howard then advocated that they, plus three other teams, should be added to the second round of the playoffs; the proposal was rejected by the NCAA, who said that Howard had played a weak schedule. In September 1989, MEAC stripped Howard of their 1987 conference championship, retroactively awarding it to Delaware State, after finding that Howard had used some players beyond their four years of NCAA eligibility.

The I-AA playoff field remained at sixteen through the 2009 season, expanding to twenty in 2010 and 24 in 2013.

=== NCAA Division I-AA playoff bracket ===
First round
November 28 – Boone, NC
Richmond	3
1	Appalachian State*	20
November 28 – Statesboro, GA
Maine	28
Georgia Southern*	31*
November 28 – Moscow, ID
Weber State	59
4	Idaho*	30
November 28 – Huntington, WV
James Madison	12
Marshall*	41
November 28 – Monroe, LA
North Texas State	9
2	Northeast Louisiana*	30
November 28 – Richmond, KY
Western Kentucky	17
Eastern Kentucky*	40
November 28 – Cedar Falls, IA
Youngstown State	28
3	Northern Iowa*	31
November 28 – Jackson, MS
Arkansas State	35
Jackson State*	32

Quarterfinals
December 5 – Boone, NC
1	Appalachian State*	19
Georgia Southern	0
December 5 – Huntington, WV
Weber State	23
Marshall*	51
December 5 – Monroe, LA
2	Northeast Louisiana*	33
Eastern Kentucky	32
December 5 – Cedar Falls, IA
3	Northern Iowa*	49
Arkansas State	28

Semifinals
December 12 – Boone, NC
1	Appalachian State*	10
Marshall	24
December 12 – Monroe, LA
2	Northeast Louisiana*	44**
3	Northern Iowa	41

National Championship Game
December 19 – Pocatello, ID
Marshall	42
2	Northeast Louisiana	43

* Next to team name denotes host institution
* Next to score denotes overtime periods
