= Laconia High School (New Hampshire) =

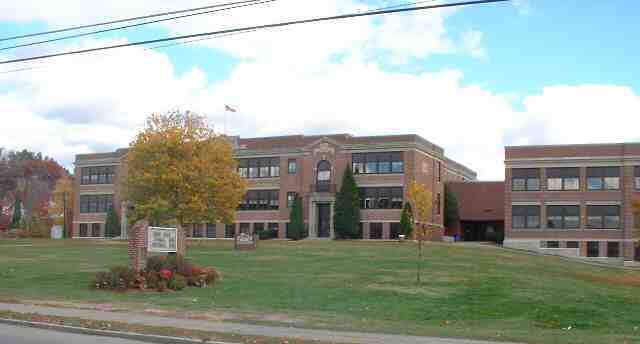
- Front of Laconia High School as seen from the street, including the main entrance and bus drop-off area.

Location
- 345 Union Ave. Laconia, New Hampshire 03246; United States; 43°32′05″N 71°27′42″W

Information
- Type: Public secondary
- Motto: Pride, Leadership, Honor
- Established: 1875
- School district: SAU 30
- Superintendent: Bob Champlin (Temporary)
- Principal: Michael Boyle (interim)
- Teaching staff: 53.00 (FTE)
- Grades: 9–12
- Enrollment: 583 (2023-2024)
- Student to teacher ratio: 11.00
- Campus type: Suburban
- Colors: Red, white and silver
- Mascot: Sachems
- Team name: Laconia Sachems
- Newspaper: Lakon
- Website: lhssau30.org

Laconia High School (LHS) is the only public high school in Laconia, New Hampshire, United States, serving grades 9 through 12. As of the 2024–25 school year, the school had an enrollment of 583 students, with 53 full-time equivalent classroom teachers, for a student–teacher ratio of 11:1. The school's athletic teams are the Sachems.

The J. Oliva Huot Technical Center, named for Joseph Oliva Huot, is located on the campus.

== History ==
Laconia High first opened in the fall of 1875 at its original campus on Academy Street, in the South End neighborhood of Laconia. In 1878, the first class graduated with nine students. In 1923, the school moved to its current campus on Union Avenue to accommodate the increased enrollment. In 1936, a separate practical arts wing was added to the Union Avenue campus. Later additions include the J. Oliva Huot Technical Center wing in 1976 and subsequent renovations in 1983. From 2012-2013 Laconia High School underwent a major renovation and expansion to include a new Technical Center wing and moving the football field farther behind the school.

In 2023, after the 100 year anniversary of the main building on Union Ave, construction began again to remodel and replace locker rooms, bathrooms, and other outdated components.

== Academics ==
LHS is accredited by the New England Association of Schools and Colleges. To graduate, students must earn a minimum of 26 credits.

A minimum grade of 65 percent is required to pass a course at Laconia High School. The academic year is divided into four quarters, with the two quarter grades averaged and rounded to determine 45 percent of the semester grade; the midterm examination accounts for 10 percent, and the final examination accounts for an additional 10 percent. Students earn one credit for each semester-long course successfully completed.

Grades are based on a scale of 0-100. The school ranks students based upon their weighted GPA. Classes are weighted with the following multipliers: AP, 5.0; Honors, 4.5; CCR (College and Career Ready), 4.0; Foundations, 4.0.

The school offers a variety of academic support options for students, including credit recovery opportunities. Following midterm assessments, students who earn a grade below 55 percent for the first semester may be eligible for credit recovery through the February School program, which is held during February break. Additional credit recovery options are available through summer school, allowing students to make up failed coursework and remain on track for graduation.

== Adult Education ==
Laconia Adult Education, located on the Laconia High School campus, offers a range of free and fee-based programs for students aged 18 and older. Programs include English for Students of Other Languages (ESL), which provides multi-level instruction in speaking, listening, reading, and writing for non-native English speakers. Adult Basic Education (ABE) classes help students improve foundational skills in reading, writing, math, and communication, and prepare for the High School Equivalency Test (HiSET).

The Adult Diploma Program (ADP) allows adults to earn credits toward a high school diploma, supporting career advancement, college entry, or military service. Laconia Adult Education also offers apprenticeship programs in the electrical and plumbing trades, combining classroom instruction with on-the-job training over a four-year period. Additional enrichment classes are available in areas such as welding, woodworking, and dance.

== Special Education: Life Skills & Transition Program ==
The Life Skills and Transition Program at Laconia High School, which emphasizes community-based learning and partnerships to support students as they prepare to transition out of the public school system. The program is operated in-house by the Laconia School District, and provides instruction in a variety of daily living skills, such as food preparation, apartment maintenance, and navigating public services, while also offering vocational experiences through collaborations with local businesses and organizations.

For students who do not earn a traditional diploma, the program extends beyond the standard four years of high school and serves eligible students up to age 22 in compliance with New Hampshire state law RSA 186-C:2, which requires school districts to continue providing special education services until that age. Students receive a certificate of completion after their fourth year of high school and may then continue in the transition program. The program builds on services that begin at the middle school level and continue through high school. Students may participate in Life Skills programming as early as their freshman year, with services tailored to individual needs and long-term planning.

Students in the Life Skills programs participate in supervised work and skill-building activities at locations including restaurants, retail businesses, nonprofit organizations, and health and fitness facilities, as well as within the school itself. The program also connects students with local resources such as community service agencies and the public library, with the goal of supporting independent living, employment readiness, and community integration as students approach age 22.

== Academic schedule ==
Laconia High School operates on a block-based daily schedule composed of four instructional periods. The schedule includes Block 1 and Block 2, followed by the Sachem Support Block (SSB), a designated academic support period during which students may seek assistance from teachers. On Fridays, SSB functions as a homeroom period. Instruction resumes with Block 3 and concludes with Block 4.

== Clubs, organizations, and activities ==
Laconia has over 20 clubs, organizations, and activities. These allow students to get involved in their school community. Some of the more prominent clubs include; Student Council, Key Club, Drama, Band, Color Guard, Math Team, FBLA, Junior Achievement, and Yearbook.

Clubs often hold many events and fundraisers throughout the year, including the following;

- Key Club: Mr. LHS
- Student Council: Homecoming, Talent Show, Winter Carnival, Semi Formal
- Drama Club: performances in the fall, winter, and a spring musical

== Athletics ==
Sports were first introduced at Laconia High School in 1923, following the move to the Union Avenue campus. The 6-acre (24,000 m²) campus and new building, which included a gymnasium, allowed the school to offer football, basketball, and baseball for male students during the fall, winter, and spring seasons, respectively. Later in the 1920s, field hockey was the first sport to be offered to girls.

Currently, there are five varsity sports offered for men, six varsity sports offered for women, and eight coed varsity sports at LHS. As of the 2018-19 school year, Laconia is classified as a Division II program in the New Hampshire Interscholastic Athletic Association, however, in some sports, they petition down and compete in Division III due to low participation. The following sports are offered:

Fall	Winter	Spring
Girls' Field Hockey, Varsity and Junior Varsity Girls' Volleyball, Varsity and Junior Varsity Girls' Soccer, Varsity and Junior Varsity Boys' Soccer, Varsity and Junior Varsity Boys' Football, Varsity and Junior Varsity; Coed Golf, Varsity; Coed Cross Country, Varsity Coed Unified Soccer	Girls' Basketball, Varsity and Junior Varsity Boys' Basketball, Varsity and Junior Varsity Coed Unified Basketball; Coed Ice Hockey, Varsity; Coed Alpine Skiing, Varsity	Girls' Softball, Varsity and Junior Varsity Girls' Lacrosse, Varsity and Junior Varsity\ Boys' Lacrosse, Varsity and Junior Varsity Boys' Baseball, Varsity and Junior Varsity; Coed Track and Field, Varsity Coed Unified Volleyball

Laconia has historically been strong at football, winning 10 championships and appearing in the finals 20 times in the last six decades. The Sachems Football team won the NH Division IV finals against Hanover in the fall of 2007, 35-14, to complete their undefeated 11-0 season and their first championship since 1999. Since the fall of 2018, the team plays in division III of the NHIAA.

== Notable alumni ==
- Stephen S. Cushing (Class of 1902), Associate Justice of the Vermont Supreme Court
- Phil Estes (Class of 1976), American football coach
- Penny Pitou (Class of 1956), Olympic silver medalist, 1960 Squaw Valley, Downhill & Giant Slalom
- Paul Rothemund (Class of 1990), 2007 MacArthur Fellow
- Steve Stetson (Class of 1969), college football player and head coach
- Melissa Blake (Class of 1990), an American television writer and producer whose career spans multiple decades in scripted television.
