= 1987 Florida A&M Rattlers football team =

American college football season

1987 Florida A&M Rattlers football
- Conference: Mid-Eastern Athletic Conference
- Record: 5–5–1 (0–0 MEAC)
- Head coach: Ken Riley (2nd season)
- Defensive coordinator: Wally Highsmith (2nd season)
- Home stadium: Bragg Memorial Stadium

1987 Mid-Eastern Athletic Conference football standings
	Conf.					Overall
Team	W		L		T	W		L		T
No. 20 Delaware State $	5	–	0	–	0	9	–	1	–	0
No. 18 Howard	4	–	1	–	0	8	–	2	–	0
South Carolina State	3	–	2	–	0	6	–	5	–	0
Bethune–Cookman	2	–	3	–	0	4	–	7	–	0
North Carolina A&T	1	–	4	–	0	3	–	8	–	0
Morgan State	0	–	5	–	0	1	–	9	–	0
Florida A&M	0	–	0	–	0	5	–	5	–	1
$ – Conference champion; Florida A&M games did not count as conference games in 1987; records adjusted for Howard and Arkansas Pine–Bluff forfeits to Delaware State; Rankings from NCAA Division I-AA Football Committee poll

The 1987 Florida A&M Rattlers football team represented Florida A&M University as a member of the Mid-Eastern Athletic Conference (MEAC) during the 1987 NCAA Division I-AA football season. Led by second-year head coach Ken Riley, the Rattlers compiled a record of 5–5–1.

== Schedule ==
Date	Opponent	Site	Result	Attendance	Source
September 5	Tuskegee	Bragg Memorial Stadium; Tallahassee, FL	L 0–23	10,342	
September 12	vs. No. 1 Georgia Southern	Gator Bowl; Jacksonville, FL (Bold City Classic)	W 17–14	17,268	
September 19	Mississippi Valley State	Bragg Memorial Stadium; Tallahassee, FL	W 10–0	6,939	
September 26	Tennessee State	Bragg Memorial Stadium; Tallahassee, FL	L 16–21	16,246	
October 3	Alabama State	Bragg Memorial Stadium; Tallahassee, FL	L 12–14	6,395	
October 17	vs. Central State (OH)	Miami Orange Bowl; Miami, FL (Orange Blossom Classic)	T 10–10	20,439	
October 24	at South Carolina State	Oliver C. Dawson Stadium; Orangeburg, SC	L 10–20	9,242	
October 31	at Alcorn State	Henderson Stadium; Lorman, MS	L 15–17		
November 7	Southern	Bragg Memorial Stadium; Tallahassee, FL	W 24–17	27,085	
November 14	No. 5 (D-II) UCF	Bragg Memorial Stadium; Tallahassee, FL	W 19–14	4,803	
November 28	vs. Bethune–Cookman	Tampa Stadium; Tampa, FL (Florida Classic)	W 21–10	41,521	
Rankings from NCAA Division I-AA Football Committee Poll released prior to the game
