= 1987 NCAA Division I-AA football rankings =

The 1987 NCAA Division I-AA football rankings are from the NCAA Division I-AA football committee. This is for the 1987 season.

== Legend ==
	Increase in ranking
	Decrease in ranking
	Not ranked previous week
(#–#)	Win–loss record
(Italics)	Number of first place votes
т	Tied with team above or below also with this symbol

== NCAA Division I-AA Football Committee poll ==
	Preseason	Week 1 Sept 15	Week 2 Sept 22	Week 3 Sept 29	Week 4 Oct 6	Week 5 Oct 13	Week 6 Oct 20	Week 7 Oct 27	Week 8 Nov 3	Week 9 Nov 10	Week 10 Nov 17	Week 11 Nov 24	
1.	Georgia Southern	Nevada (4)	Nevada (2–0) (4)	Holy Cross (3–0) (4)	Holy Cross (4–0) (4)	Holy Cross (5–0) (4)	Holy Cross (6–0) (4)	Holy Cross (7–0) (4)	Holy Cross (8–0) (4)	Holy Cross (9–0) (4)	Holy Cross (10–0) (4)	Holy Cross (11–0) (4)	1.
2.	Arkansas State	Holy Cross	Holy Cross (2–0)	Northeast Louisiana (3–0)	Northeast Louisiana (4–0)	North Texas State (5–1)	Appalachian State (4–2)	Appalachian State (5–2)	Appalachian State (6–2)	Appalachian State (7–2)	Appalachian State (8–2)	Appalachian State (9–2)	2.
3.	Eastern Kentucky	Murray State	Northeast Louisiana (2–0)	Maine (4–0)	North Texas State (4–1)	Appalachian State (3–2)	Northeast Louisiana (4–2)	Jackson State (6–0–1)	James Madison (7–1)	Northeast Louisiana (7–2)	Northeast Louisiana (8–2)	Northeast Louisiana (9–2)	3.
4.	Holy Cross	Northwestern State (Note: In the actual printed polls, Northwestern State was listed as Northwestern Louisiana)	Appalachian State (2–1) т	Northern Iowa (3–1)	Appalachian State (2–2)	Eastern Kentucky (4–1)	Jackson State (5–0–1)	James Madison (6–1)	North Texas State (6–2)	Jackson State (7–1–1)	Northern Iowa (7–3)	Northern Iowa (8–3)	4.
5.	North Texas State	Middle Tennessee	Maine (3–0) т	North Texas State (3–1)	Eastern Kentucky (3–1)	Jackson State (4–0–1)	James Madison (5–1)	North Texas State (5–2)	Jackson State (6–1–1)	Northern Iowa (6–3)	Idaho (8–2)	Idaho (9–2)	5.
6.	Nevada	Maine	Northern Iowa (2–1)	Nevada (2–1)	Jackson State (3–0–1)	James Madison (4–1) т	Western Illinois (6–1)	New Hampshire (5–1)	New Hampshire (6–1)	Idaho (8–2)	Georgia Southern (7–3)	Georgia Southern (8–3)	6.
7.	Northern Iowa	Appalachian State	North Texas State (2–1)	Appalachian State (2–2)	Georgia Southern (3–2) т	Northeast Louisiana (4–1) т	North Texas State (5–2)	Weber State (6–1)	Northern Iowa (5–3)	Delaware State (7–1)	Eastern Kentucky (7–2)	Eastern Kentucky (8–2)	7.
8.	Delaware	Northeast Louisiana	East Tennessee State (3–0)	Northwestern State (2–1)	Southern (4–0) т	Georgia Southern (4–2)	New Hampshire (4–1)	Western Kentucky (5–2)	Northeast Louisiana (6–2)	Georgia Southern (7–3)	Arkansas State (7–2–1)	James Madison (9–2)	8.
9.	UMass (Note: In the actual printed polls, UMass was listed as Massachusetts)	William & Mary	Boise State (2–0)	Jackson State (2–0–1) т	James Madison (3–1)	Western Illinois (5–1)	Western Carolina (4–2)	Northeast Louisiana (5–2)	Delaware State (6–1)	Eastern Kentucky (7–2)	James Madison (8–2)	Jackson State (8–2–1)	9.
10.	Delaware State	Furman	Georgia Southern (2–1)	Richmond (3–1) т	Northern Arizona (3–1)	New Hampshire (3–1)	Weber State (5–1)	Northern Iowa (4–3)	Idaho (7–2)	Arkansas State (6–2–1)	Jackson State (7–2–1)	Weber State (9–2)	10.
11.	Jackson State	Chattanooga	Northwestern State (2–1)	Colgate (3–1)	Northern Iowa (3–2)	Nevada (3–2)	Western Kentucky (4–2)	Delaware State (5–1)	Eastern Kentucky (6–2)	James Madison (7–2)	Weber State (8–2)	Western Kentucky (7–3)	11.
12.	Murray State	Northern Iowa	Middle Tennessee (1–1)	Eastern Kentucky (2–1)	Chattanooga (3–1)	Western Carolina (3–2)	Northern Iowa (3–3)	Idaho (6–2)	Georgia Southern (6–3)	North Texas State (6–3)	Western Kentucky (6–3)	Arkansas State (7–3–1)	12.
13.	Furman т	North Texas State	Colgate (2–1)	Georgia Southern (2–2)	Western Illinois (4–1)	Weber State (4–1)	Delaware State (4–1)	Eastern Kentucky (5–2)	Weber State (6–2)	Weber State (7–2)	Richmond (7–3)	Maine (8–3)	13.
14.	Sam Houston State т	Boston University т	Northern Arizona (2–0)	Eastern Illinois (3–1)	New Hampshire (3–1)	Western Kentucky (3–2)	Idaho (5–2)	Georgia Southern (5–3)	Western Kentucky (5–3)	Western Kentucky (5–3)	Delaware State (7–2)	Marshall (7–4)	14.
15.	Southern Illinois	Illinois State т	Jackson State (1–0–1)	Idaho (3–1)	Montana (2–2)	Nicholls State (4–1–1)	Middle Tennessee (4–2)	Arkansas State (5–2)	Arkansas State (5–2–1)	Richmond (6–3)	Maine (8–3)	Youngstown State (8–3)	15.
16.	Northeast Louisiana т	East Tennessee State т	Richmond (2–1)	Southern (3–0)	East Tennessee State (3–1) т	Delaware State (3–1)	Eastern Kentucky (4–2)	Western Illinois (6–2)	Western Illinois (7–2)	Northern Arizona (7–2)	New Hampshire (7–2) т	North Texas State (7–4)	16.
17.	William & Mary т	Boise State	Eastern Illinois (2–1)	James Madison (3–1) т	Maine (4–1) т	Southern (4–1)	Arkansas State (4–2) т	Richmond (5–3)	Richmond (5–2–1)	Maine (7–3)	Sam Houston State (7–3) т	Richmond (7–4)	17.
18.	North Carolina A&T	Southwest Missouri State	Furman (2–1)	Western Illinois (3–1) т	Western Carolina (2–2)	Northern Iowa (3–3)	Chattanooga (4–2) т	Western Carolina (4–3)	Marshall (6–3)	New Hampshire (6–2)	Marshall (7–4)	Howard (9–1)	18.
19.	New Hampshire	Penn	Eastern Kentucky (1–1)	Chattanooga (2–1)	Nevada (2–2)	Boise State (4–1)	Richmond (4–3)	Northern Arizona (5–2)	Northern Arizona (6–2)	Western Illinois (7–3)	Youngstown State (7–3)	Sam Houston State (8–3)	19.
20.	Idaho	Southern	Southern (2–0)	East Tennessee State (3–1)	Northwestern State (2–2)	Middle Tennessee (3–2)	Georgia Southern (4–3)	Howard (5–1) т	Harvard (6–1) т	Howard (7–1) т	Howard (8–1) т	Delaware State (7–3)	20.
21.								Middle Tennessee (4–2–1) т	Howard (6–1) т	Marshall (6–4) т	North Texas State (6–4) т		21.
22.										Sam Houston State (6–3) т			22.
23.										Youngstown State (6–3) т			23.
	Preseason	Week 1 Sept 15	Week 2 Sept 22	Week 3 Sept 29	Week 4 Oct 6	Week 5 Oct 13	Week 6 Oct 20	Week 7 Oct 27	Week 8 Nov 3	Week 9 Nov 10	Week 10 Nov 17	Week 11 Nov 24	
		Dropped: 1 Georgia Southern; 2 Arkansas State; 3 Eastern Kentucky; 8 Delaware; 9 UMass; 10 Delaware State; 11 Jackson State; 14 Sam Houston State; 15 Southern Illinois; 18 North Carolina A&T; 19 New Hampshire; 20 Idaho	Dropped: 3 Murray State; 9 William & Mary; 11 Chattanooga; 14 Boston University; 15 Illinois State; 18 Southwest Missouri State; 19 Penn	Dropped: 9 Boise State; 12 Middle Tennessee; 14 Northern Arizona; 18 Furman	Dropped: 10 Richmond; 11 Colgate; 14 Eastern Illinois; 15 Idaho	Dropped: 10 Northern Arizona; 12 Chattanooga; 15 Montana; 16 East Tennessee State; 17 Maine; 20 Northwestern State	Dropped: 11 Nevada; 15 Nicholls State; 17 Southern; 19 Boise State	Dropped: 18 Chattanooga	Dropped: 18 Western Carolina; 20 Middle Tennessee	Dropped: 20 Harvard	Dropped: 16 Northern Arizona; 19 Western Illinois	Dropped: 16 New Hampshire	
