= 1991 Northwestern State Demons football team =

American college football season

1991 Northwestern State Demons football
- Conference: Southland Conference
- Record: 6–5 (4–3 Southland)
- Head coach: Sam Goodwin (9th season)
- Home stadium: Harry Turpin Stadium

1991 Southland Conference football standings
	Conf.					Overall
Team	W		L		T	W		L		T
No. 12 Sam Houston State +^	5	–	2	–	0	8	–	3	–	1
No. 19 McNeese State +^	4	–	1	–	2	6	–	4	–	2
No. 18 NE Louisiana	4	–	2	–	1	7	–	3	–	1
SW Texas State	4	–	3	–	0	7	–	4	–	0
Northwestern State	4	–	3	–	0	6	–	5	–	0
Nicholls State	2	–	5	–	0	4	–	7	–	0
North Texas	2	–	5	–	0	3	–	7	–	1
Stephen F. Austin	1	–	5	–	1	2	–	8	–	1
+ – Conference co-champions; ^ – NCAA Division I-AA playoff participant; Rankings from NCAA Division I-AA Football Committee poll

The 1991 Northwestern State Demons football team was an American football team that represented Northwestern State University as a member of the Southland Conference during the 1991 NCAA Division I-AA football season. In their ninth year under head coach Sam Goodwin, the team compiled an overall record of 6–5, with a mark of 4–3 in conference play, and finished tied for fourth in the Southland.

== Schedule ==
Date	Opponent	Site	Result	Attendance	Source
September 7	at Arkansas State*	Indian Stadium; Jonesboro, AR	W 28–3	20,000	
September 14	at No. 2 Nevada*	Mackay Stadium; Reno, NV	L 14–45	18,382	
September 21	at UTEP*	Sun Bowl; El Paso, TX	L 0–14	30,655	
September 28	No. 12 (D-II) East Texas State*	Harry Turpin Stadium; Natchitoches, LA	W 26–23	11,400	
October 12	North Texas	Harry Turpin Stadium; Natchitoches, LA	W 24–10		
October 19	McNeese State	Harry Turpin Stadium; Natchitoches, LA (rivalry)	W 20–3	10,100	
October 26	Northeast Louisiana	Harry Turpin Stadium; Natchitoches, LA (rivalry)	L 9–24		
November 2	at Southwest Texas State	Bobcat Stadium; San Marcos, TX	L 0–24	9,726	
November 9	at No. 10 Sam Houston State	Bowers Stadium; Huntsville, TX	L 3–13		
November 16	at Nicholls State	John L. Guidry Stadium; Thibodaux, LA (rivalry)	W 16–10		
November 23	Stephen F. Austin	Harry Turpin Stadium; Natchitoches, LA (rivalry)	W 52–0		
*Non-conference game; Rankings from NCAA Division I-AA Football Committee Poll released prior to the game
