= 1991 North Texas Mean Green football team =

American college football season

1991 North Texas Mean Green football
- Conference: Southland Conference
- Record: 3–7–1 (2–5 Southland)
- Head coach: Dennis Parker (1st season)
- Home stadium: Fouts Field

1991 Southland Conference football standings
	Conf.					Overall
Team	W		L		T	W		L		T
No. 12 Sam Houston State +^	5	–	2	–	0	8	–	3	–	1
No. 19 McNeese State +^	4	–	1	–	2	6	–	4	–	2
No. 18 NE Louisiana	4	–	2	–	1	7	–	3	–	1
SW Texas State	4	–	3	–	0	7	–	4	–	0
Northwestern State	4	–	3	–	0	6	–	5	–	0
Nicholls State	2	–	5	–	0	4	–	7	–	0
North Texas	2	–	5	–	0	3	–	7	–	1
Stephen F. Austin	1	–	5	–	1	2	–	8	–	1
+ – Conference co-champions; ^ – NCAA Division I-AA playoff participant; Rankings from NCAA Division I-AA Football Committee poll

The 1991 North Texas Mean Green football team was an American football team that represented the University of North Texas during the 1991 NCAA Division I-AA football season as a member of the Southland Conference. In their first year under head coach Dennis Parker, the team compiled a 3–7–1 record.

== Schedule ==
Date	Opponent	Site	Result	Attendance	Source
September 7	Abilene Christian*	Fouts Field; Denton, TX	W 24–0		
September 14	at No. 9 (I-A) Oklahoma*	Oklahoma Memorial Stadium; Norman, OK	L 2–40	69,211	
September 21	at No. 1 Nevada*	Mackay Stadium; Reno, NV	L 0–72	19,180	
September 28	No. 12 Southwest Missouri State*	Fouts Field; Denton, TX	T 21–21	10,415	
October 12	at Northwestern State	Harry Turpin Stadium; Natchitoches, LA	L 10–24		
October 19	Stephen F. Austin^{†}	Fouts Field; Denton, TX	W 18–14	14,295	
October 26	Sam Houston State	Fouts Field; Denton, TX	L 6–14		
November 2	at McNeese State	Cowboy Stadium; Lake Charles, LA	L 3–41		
November 9	at Nicholls State	John L. Guidry Stadium; Thibodaux, LA	W 24–19		
November 16	Southwest Texas State	Fouts Field; Denton, TX	L 6–38		
November 23	at Northeast Louisiana	Malone Stadium; Monroe, LA	L 21–44		
*Non-conference game; ^{†}Homecoming; Rankings from NCAA Division I-AA Football Committee Poll released prior to the game
