= 1991 Stephen F. Austin Lumberjacks football team =

American college football season

1991 Stephen F. Austin Lumberjacks football
- Conference: Southland Conference
- Record: 2–8–1 (1–5–1 Southland)
- Head coach: Lynn Graves (3rd season)
- Home stadium: Homer Bryce Stadium

1991 Southland Conference football standings
	Conf.					Overall
Team	W		L		T	W		L		T
No. 12 Sam Houston State +^	5	–	2	–	0	8	–	3	–	1
No. 19 McNeese State +^	4	–	1	–	2	6	–	4	–	2
No. 18 NE Louisiana	4	–	2	–	1	7	–	3	–	1
SW Texas State	4	–	3	–	0	7	–	4	–	0
Northwestern State	4	–	3	–	0	6	–	5	–	0
Nicholls State	2	–	5	–	0	4	–	7	–	0
North Texas	2	–	5	–	0	3	–	7	–	1
Stephen F. Austin	1	–	5	–	1	2	–	8	–	1
+ – Conference co-champions; ^ – NCAA Division I-AA playoff participant; Rankings from NCAA Division I-AA Football Committee poll

The 1991 Stephen F. Austin Lumberjacks football team was an American football team that represented Stephen F. Austin State University as a member of the Southland Conference during the 1991 NCAA Division I-AA football season. In their third year under head coach Lynn Graves, the team compiled an overall record of 2–8–1, with a mark of 1–5–1 in conference play, and finished eighth in the Southland.

== Schedule ==
Date	Opponent	Site	Result	Attendance	Source
September 7	Arkansas–Monticello*	Homer Bryce Stadium; Nacogdoches, TX	W 50–9	10,645	
September 21	at Jackson State*	Mississippi Veterans Memorial Stadium; Jackson, MS	L 16–31	10,224	
September 28	at No. 5 Boise State*	Bronco Stadium; Boise, ID	L 7–38	20,841	
October 5	Youngstown State*	Homer Bryce Stadium; Nacogdoches, TX	L 9–16	8,212	
October 12	Southwest Texas State	Homer Bryce Stadium; Nacogdoches, TX	L 15–31		
October 19	at North Texas	Fouts Field; Denton, TX	L 14–18	14,295	
October 26	at Nicholls State	John L. Guidry Stadium; Thibodaux, LA	L 0–26	1,862	
November 2	No. 5 Sam Houston State	Homer Bryce Stadium; Nacogdoches, TX (Battle of the Piney Woods)	W 13–3	6,349	
November 9	at No. 19 McNeese State	Cowboy Stadium; Lake Charles, LA	T 7–7	10,261	
November 16	Northeast Louisiana	Homer Bryce Stadium; Nacogdoches, TX	L 20–48		
November 23	at Northwestern State	Harry Turpin Stadium; Natchitoches, LA (rivalry)	L 0–52		
*Non-conference game; Rankings from NCAA Division I-AA Football Committee Poll released prior to the game
