= 1991 Southwest Texas State Bobcats football team =

American college football season

1991 Southwest Texas State Bobcats football
- Conference: Southland Conference
- Record: 7–4 (4–3 SLC)
- Head coach: Dennis Franchione (2nd season)
- Home stadium: Bobcat Stadium

1991 Southland Conference football standings
	Conf.					Overall
Team	W		L		T	W		L		T
No. 12 Sam Houston State +^	5	–	2	–	0	8	–	3	–	1
No. 19 McNeese State +^	4	–	1	–	2	6	–	4	–	2
No. 18 NE Louisiana	4	–	2	–	1	7	–	3	–	1
SW Texas State	4	–	3	–	0	7	–	4	–	0
Northwestern State	4	–	3	–	0	6	–	5	–	0
Nicholls State	2	–	5	–	0	4	–	7	–	0
North Texas	2	–	5	–	0	3	–	7	–	1
Stephen F. Austin	1	–	5	–	1	2	–	8	–	1
+ – Conference co-champions; ^ – NCAA Division I-AA playoff participant; Rankings from NCAA Division I-AA Football Committee poll

The 1991 Southwest Texas State Bobcats football team was an American football team that represented Southwest Texas State University (now known as Texas State University) during the 1991 NCAA Division I-AA football season as a member of the Southland Conference (SLC). In their second year under head coach Dennis Franchione, the team compiled an overall record of 7–4 with a mark of 4–3 in conference play.

== Schedule ==
Date	Opponent	Rank	Site	Result	Attendance	Source
September 7	Texas A&I*	No. 10	Bobcat Stadium; San Marcos, TX	W 29–14		
September 14	at No. 4 Idaho*	No. 9	Kibbie Dome; Moscow, ID	L 38–41	10,200	
September 28	at Nicholls State	No. 14	John L. Guidry Stadium; Thibodaux, LA (rivalry)	W 19–10		
October 5	No. 16 Northeast Louisiana	No. T–12	Bobcat Stadium; San Marcos, TX	L 8–17		
October 12	at Stephen F. Austin		Homer Bryce Stadium; Nacogdoches, TX	W 31–15		
October 19	vs. Texas Southern*		Alamo Stadium; San Antonio, TX	W 31–29		
October 26	at McNeese State		Cowboy Stadium; Lake Charles, LA	L 18–19		
November 2	Northwestern State		Bobcat Stadium; San Marcos, TX	W 24–0	9,726	
November 9	Prairie View A&M*		Bobcat Stadium; San Marcos, TX	W 59–6		
November 16	at North Texas		Fouts Field; Denton, TX	W 38–6		
November 23	No. 13 Sam Houston State		Bobcat Stadium; San Marcos, TX (rivalry)	L 14–20		
*Non-conference game; Rankings from NCAA Division I-AA Football Committee Poll released prior to the game
