= 1991 Nicholls State Colonels football team =

American college football season

1991 Nicholls State Colonels football
- Conference: Southland Conference
- Record: 4–7 (2–5 Southland)
- Head coach: Phil Greco (5th season)
- Home stadium: John L. Guidry Stadium

1991 Southland Conference football standings
	Conf.					Overall
Team	W		L		T	W		L		T
No. 12 Sam Houston State +^	5	–	2	–	0	8	–	3	–	1
No. 19 McNeese State +^	4	–	1	–	2	6	–	4	–	2
No. 18 NE Louisiana	4	–	2	–	1	7	–	3	–	1
SW Texas State	4	–	3	–	0	7	–	4	–	0
Northwestern State	4	–	3	–	0	6	–	5	–	0
Nicholls State	2	–	5	–	0	4	–	7	–	0
North Texas	2	–	5	–	0	3	–	7	–	1
Stephen F. Austin	1	–	5	–	1	2	–	8	–	1
+ – Conference co-champions; ^ – NCAA Division I-AA playoff participant; Rankings from NCAA Division I-AA Football Committee poll

The 1991 Nicholls State Colonels football team represented Nicholls State University as a member of the Southland Conference during the 1991 NCAA Division I-AA football season. Led by fifth-year head coach Phil Greco, the Colonels compiled an overall record of 4–7 with mark of 2–5 in conference play, tying for sixth place in the Southland. Nicholls State played home games at John L. Guidry Stadium in Thibodaux, Louisiana.

== Schedule ==
Date	Opponent	Site	Result	Attendance	Source
August 31	No. 14 (D-II) Texas A&I*	John L. Guidry Stadium; Thibodaux, LA	L 3–7		
September 7	at No. 16 Northeast Louisiana	Malone Stadium; Monroe, LA	W 15–10		
September 21	at Troy State*	Veterans Memorial Stadium; Troy, AL	W 25–17	5,000	
September 28	Southwest Texas State*	John L. Guidry Stadium; Thibodaux, LA (rivalry)	L 10–19		
October 5	at McNeese State	Cowboy Stadium; Lake Charles, LA	L 3–21	14,621	
October 12	at No. 8 Sam Houston State	Bowers Stadium; Huntsville, TX	L 19–28		
October 26	Stephen F. Austin	John L. Guidry Stadium; Thibodaux, LA	W 26–0	1,862	
November 2	at Southern*	A. W. Mumford Stadium; Baton Rouge, LA	W 21–7		
November 9	North Texas	John L. Guidry Stadium; Thibodaux, LA	L 19–24		
November 16	Northwestern State	John L. Guidry Stadium; Thibodaux, LA (rivalry)	L 10–16		
November 23	at Georgia Southern*	Paulson Stadium; Statesboro, GA	L 6–40	14,493	
*Non-conference game; Rankings from NCAA Division I-AA Football Committee Poll released prior to the game
