= Manning Passing Academy =

American Football training program

The Manning Passing Academy is a four-day American football clinic held annually at Nicholls State University in Thibodaux, Louisiana. Held in the summer, it is hosted by the Manning family (Archie, Cooper, Peyton, Eli) and several current and former National Football League (NFL) and college football players and coaches. It is designed to coach four different positions: quarterback, running back, wide receiver and tight end.

The camp was originally founded in 1996 by Archie Manning at Tulane University and has also been held at Southeastern Louisiana University. In 2005, the camp moved to the campus of Nicholls State University.

== Eligibility ==
Due to NCAA rules, all attendees must be between the ages of those entering the eighth grade and seniors-to-be in high school. High school graduates are not allowed to attend. Attendees are matched with and against others of the same age, size, and ability level.

== Athletic facilities ==
- Manning Field at John L. Guidry Stadium
- Boucvault Athletic Complex
- Gaubert Oil Practice Facility at Shaw Sports Turf/Manning Field
- Stopher Gymnasium
