= 1991 Nevada Wolf Pack football team =

American college football season

1991 Nevada Wolf Pack football

Big Sky champion

NCAA Division I-AA Quarterfinal, L 28–30 vs. Youngstown State
- Conference: Big Sky Conference

Ranking
- AP: No. 1
- Record: 12–1 (8–0 Big Sky)
- Head coach: Chris Ault (16th season)
- Home stadium: Mackay Stadium

1991 Big Sky Conference football standings
	Conf.					Overall
Team	W		L		T	W		L		T
No. 1 Nevada $^	8	–	0	–	0	12	–	1	–	0
No. 15 Weber State ^	6	–	2	–	0	8	–	4	–	0
Montana	6	–	2	–	0	7	–	4	–	0
Boise State	4	–	4	–	0	7	–	4	–	0
Idaho	4	–	4	–	0	6	–	5	–	0
Eastern Washington	4	–	4	–	0	5	–	6	–	0
Idaho State	2	–	6	–	0	3	–	7	–	1
Northern Arizona	1	–	7	–	0	3	–	8	–	0
Montana State	1	–	7	–	0	2	–	9	–	0
$ – Conference champion; ^ – NCAA Division I-AA playoff participant; Rankings from NCAA Division I-AA Poll

The 1991 Nevada Wolf Pack football team was an American football team that represented the University of Nevada, Reno in the Big Sky Conference (BSC) during the 1991 NCAA Division I-AA football season. In their 16th season under head coach Chris Ault, the Wolf Pack compiled a 12–2 record (8–0 against conference opponents), won the BSC championship and lost to Youngstown State, the eventual national champion, in the NCAA Division I-AA Quarterfinals. They played their home games at Mackay Stadium.

This was the Wolf Pack's last year as a member of the BSC and I-AA (now FCS) as they joined the Big West Conference and the NCAA Division I-A—now the known as the NCAA Division I Football Bowl Subdivision (FBS)—for the 1992 season.

== Schedule ==
Date	Opponent	Rank	Site	Result	Attendance	Source
September 7	UNLV*	No. 5	Mackay Stadium; Reno, NV (Fremont Cannon)	W 50–8	24,123	
September 14	Northwestern State*	No. 2	Mackay Stadium; Reno, NV	W 45–14	18,382	
September 21	North Texas*	No. 1	Mackay Stadium; Reno, NV	W 72–0	19,180	
September 28	Montana State	No. 1	Mackay Stadium; Reno, NV	W 54–12	18,005	
October 5	at No. 14 Idaho	No. 1	Kibbie Dome; Moscow, ID	W 31–23	14,500	
October 12	Idaho State^{†}	No. 1	Mackay Stadium; Reno, NV	W 41–20	22,630	
October 19	at Eastern Washington	No. 1	Woodward Field; Cheney, WA	W 51–14	4,704	
October 26	No. 10 Boise State	No. 1	Mackay Stadium; Reno, NV (rivalry)	W 17–14	27,668	
November 2	Weber State	No. 1	Mackay Stadium; Reno, NV	W 55–49	21,031	
November 9	at Montana	No. 1	Washington–Grizzly Stadium; Missoula, MT	W 35–28 ^{2OT}	12,644	
November 16	at Northern Arizona	No. 1	Walkup Skydome; Flagstaff, AZ	W 45–16	3,679	
November 30	No. 19 McNeese State*	No. 1	Mackay Stadium; Reno, NV (NCAA Division I-AA First Round)	W 22–16	15,962	
December 7	No. 13 Youngstown State*	No. 1	Mackay Stadium; Reno, NV (NCAA Division I-AA Quarterfinal)	L 28–30	13,476	
*Non-conference game; ^{†}Homecoming; Rankings from NCAA Division I-AA Football Committee Poll released prior to the game
