= Stopher Gymnasium =

Arena in Louisiana, USA

David R. Stopher Gymnasium
- Stopher Gym
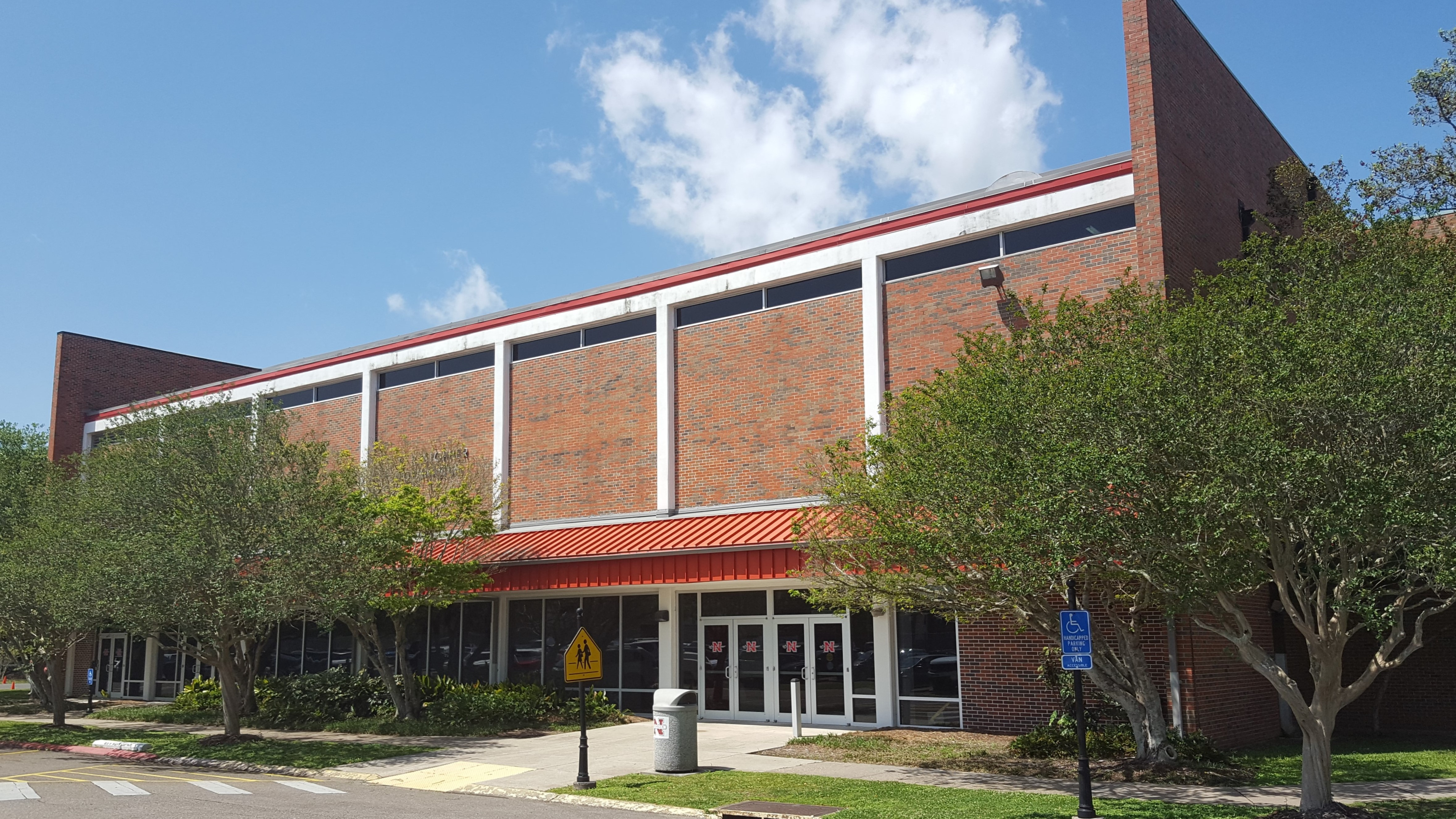
- Interactive map of David R. Stopher Gymnasium
- Location: Acadia Dr. Thibodaux, LA
- Coordinates: 29.79235°N 90.80135°W
- Owner: Nicholls State University
- Operator: Nicholls Athletics Department
- Capacity: 3,800
- Surface: Multi-surface

Construction
- Opened: 1970
- Renovated: 2014

Tenants
- Nicholls Colonels men's basketball (NCAA); Nicholls Colonels women's basketball (NCAA); Nicholls Colonels women's volleyball (NCAA)

David R. Stopher Gymnasium or Stopher Gym is a 3,800-seat multi-purpose arena in Thibodaux, Louisiana, United States, on the campus Nicholls State University. It is named for David R. Stopher.

It is home to the Nicholls Colonels men's and women's basketball teams and women's volleyball team. It hosts many other functions including Nicholls' commencement, Manning Passing Academy and a variety of concerts and community events.

== History ==
The first game in Stopher Gymnasium was in 1970.

After the 2013–2014 season, the gymnasium was renovated over several years. The men's basketball locker room and offices were overhauled and redesigned. The renovations featured a private entrance for the players and coaches with updated offices for the coaches, new meeting rooms and a lobby and lounge for the players. The lounge area includes televisions and audio equipment, leading into the locker room. The athletic training room was moved to another area of the building allowing it to quadruple in size. A visiting team locker room was also built in the gymnasium. As part of the renovation in 2015, a 27-foot (8.2 m) HD video scoreboard and scoreboards on each end of the court were added.

On January 27, 2018, the Colonels played their first game on Broussard Court. It is named after Nicholls Hall of Fame men's basketball coach Rickey Broussard. In addition to the new court, the gymnasium received new portable goals, LED scorers tables, premium courtside seating and new lighting in 2018.

== Gallery ==
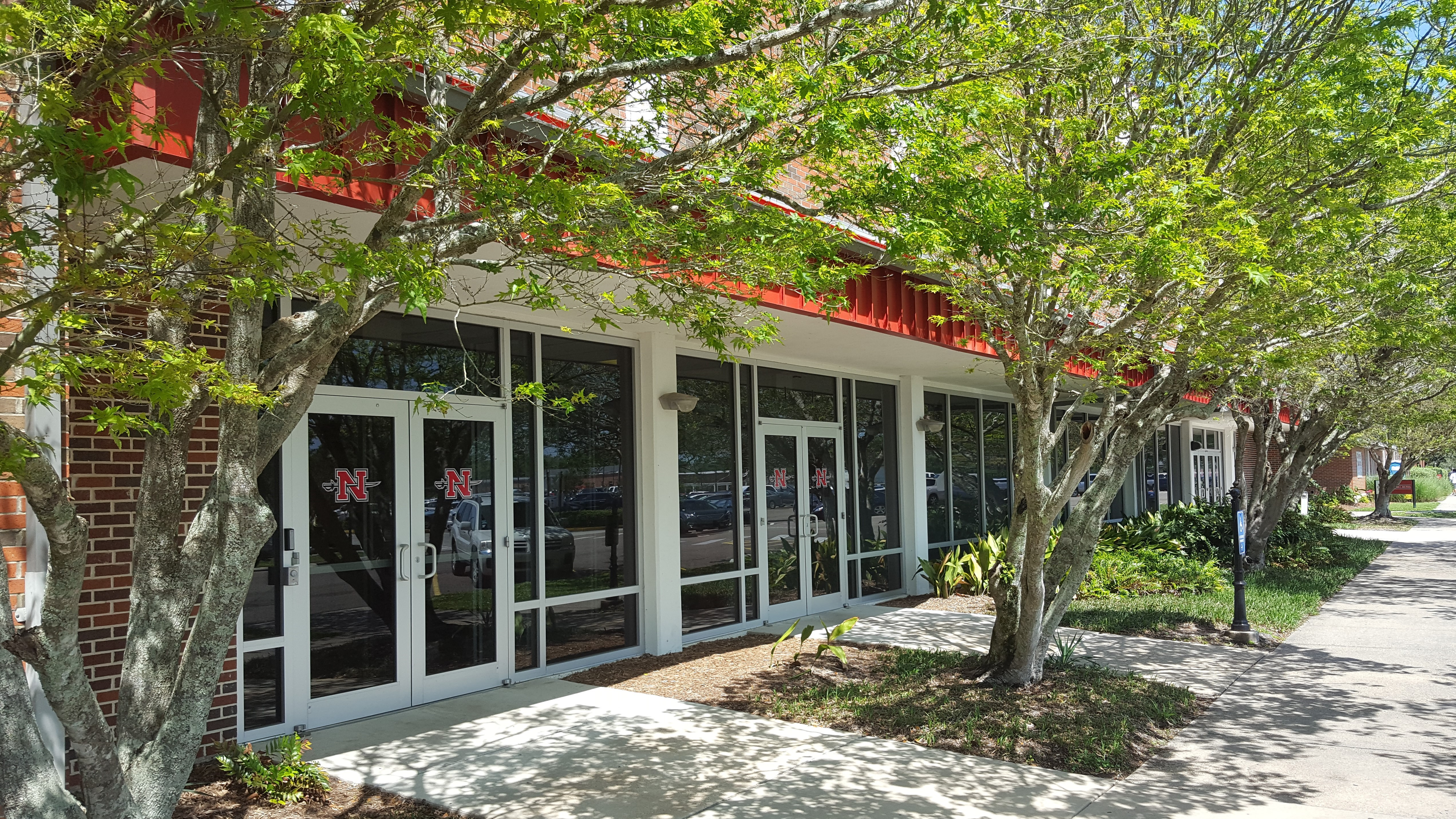
Stopher Gymnasium Main Entrance

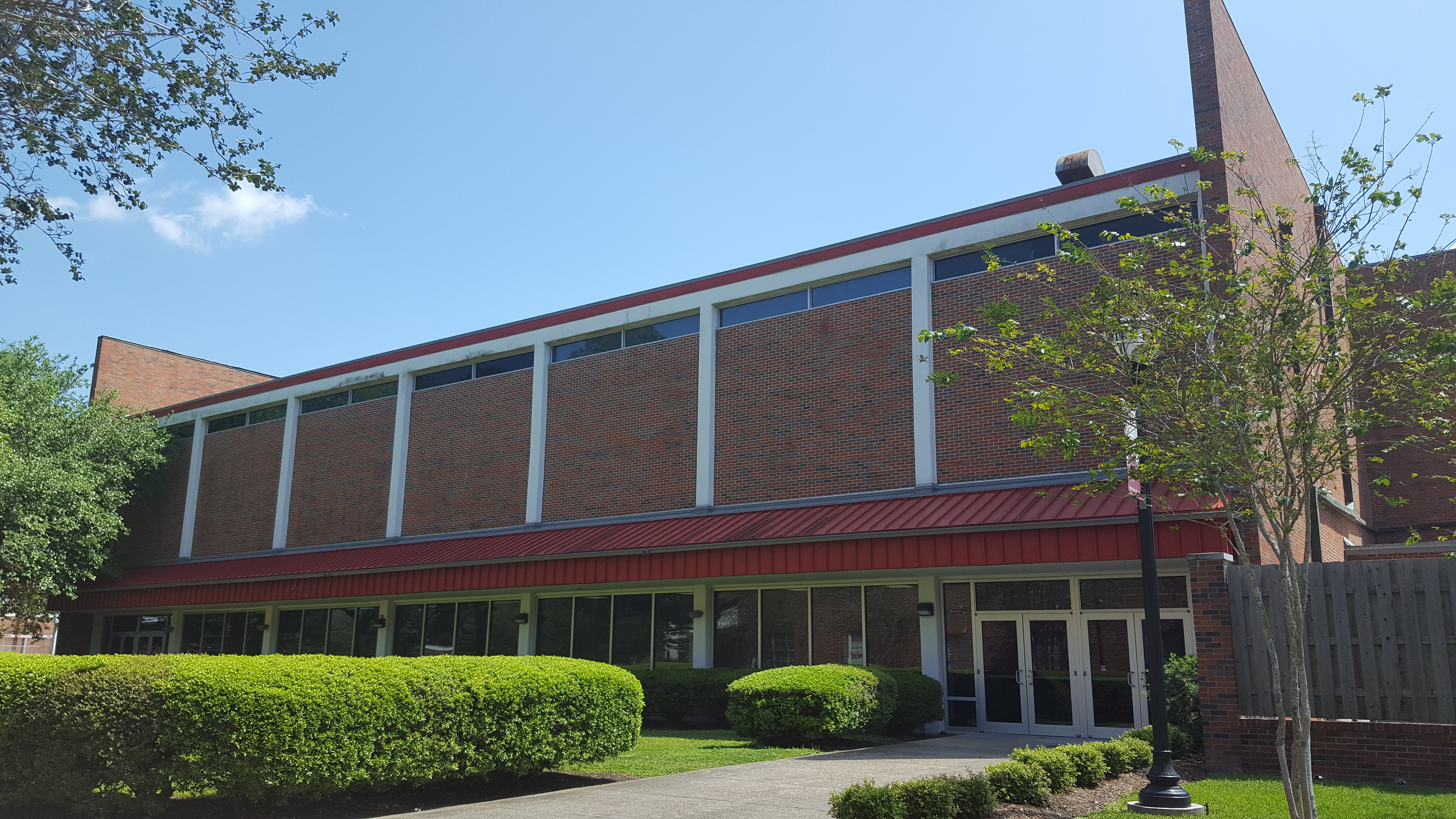
Stopher Gymnasium Quad Entrance

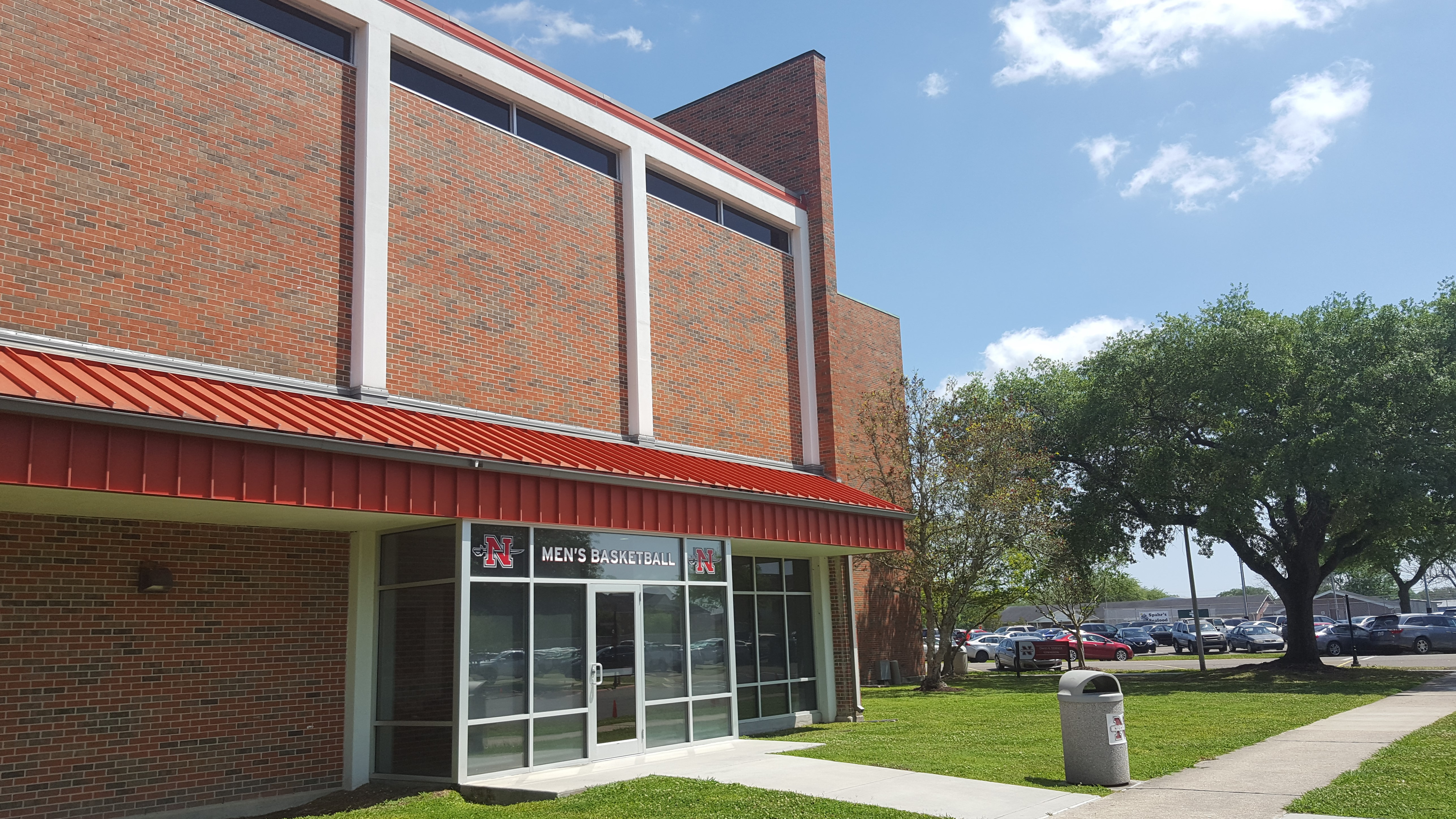
Stopher Gymnasium Players Entrance

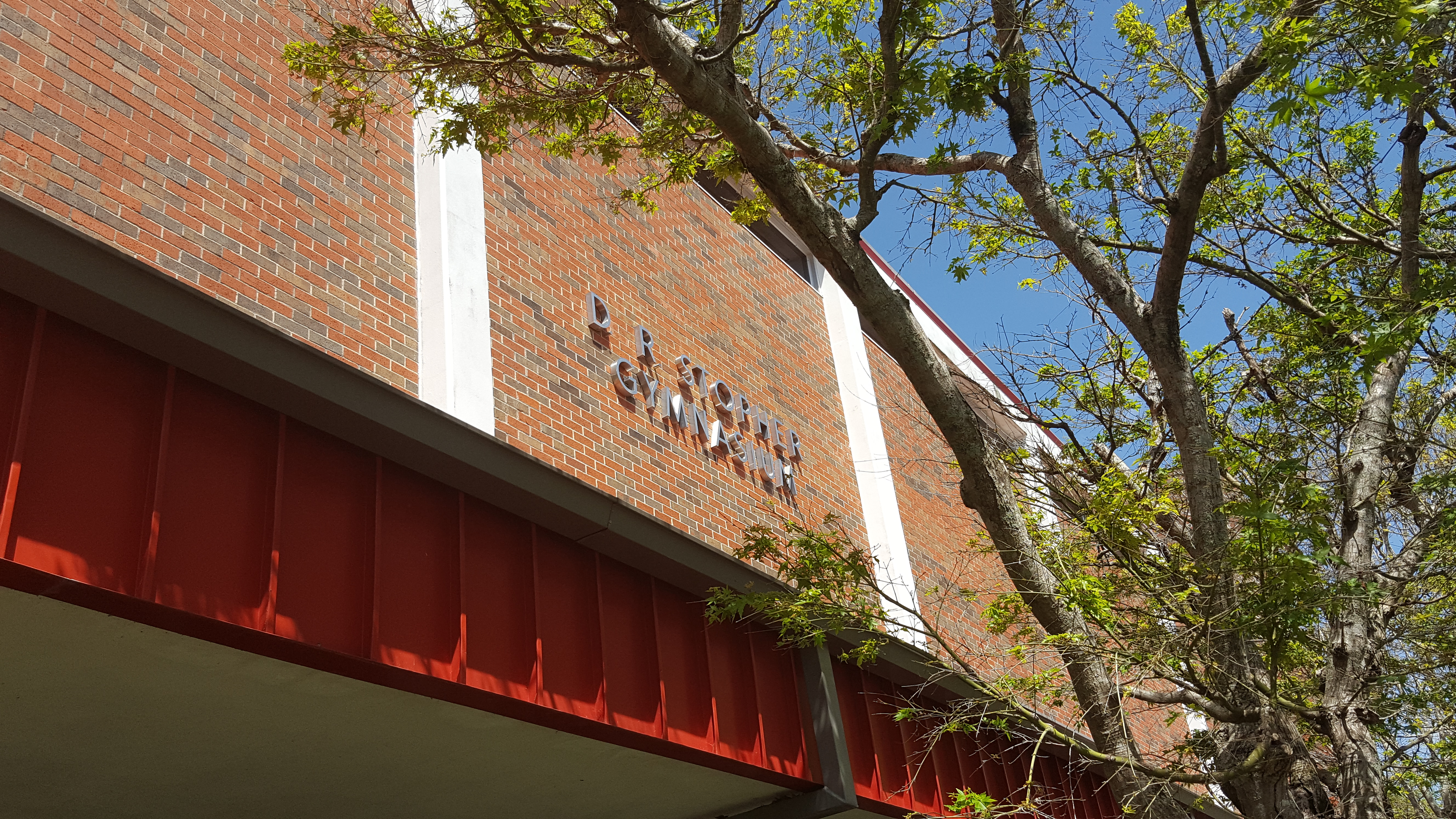
Stopher Gymnasium Marquee

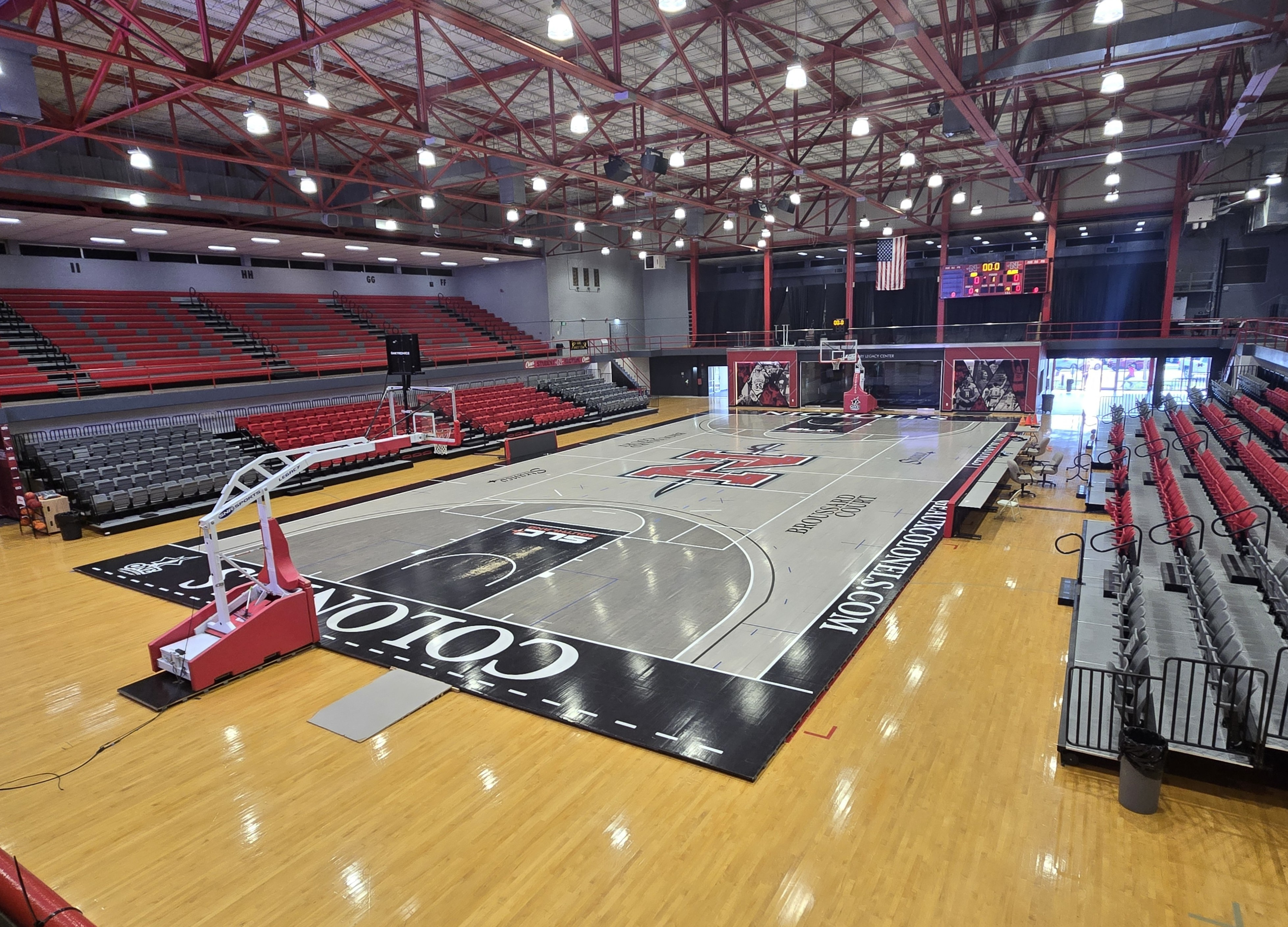
Stopher Gymnasium Broussard Court and Don Landry Legacy Center, Away Corner

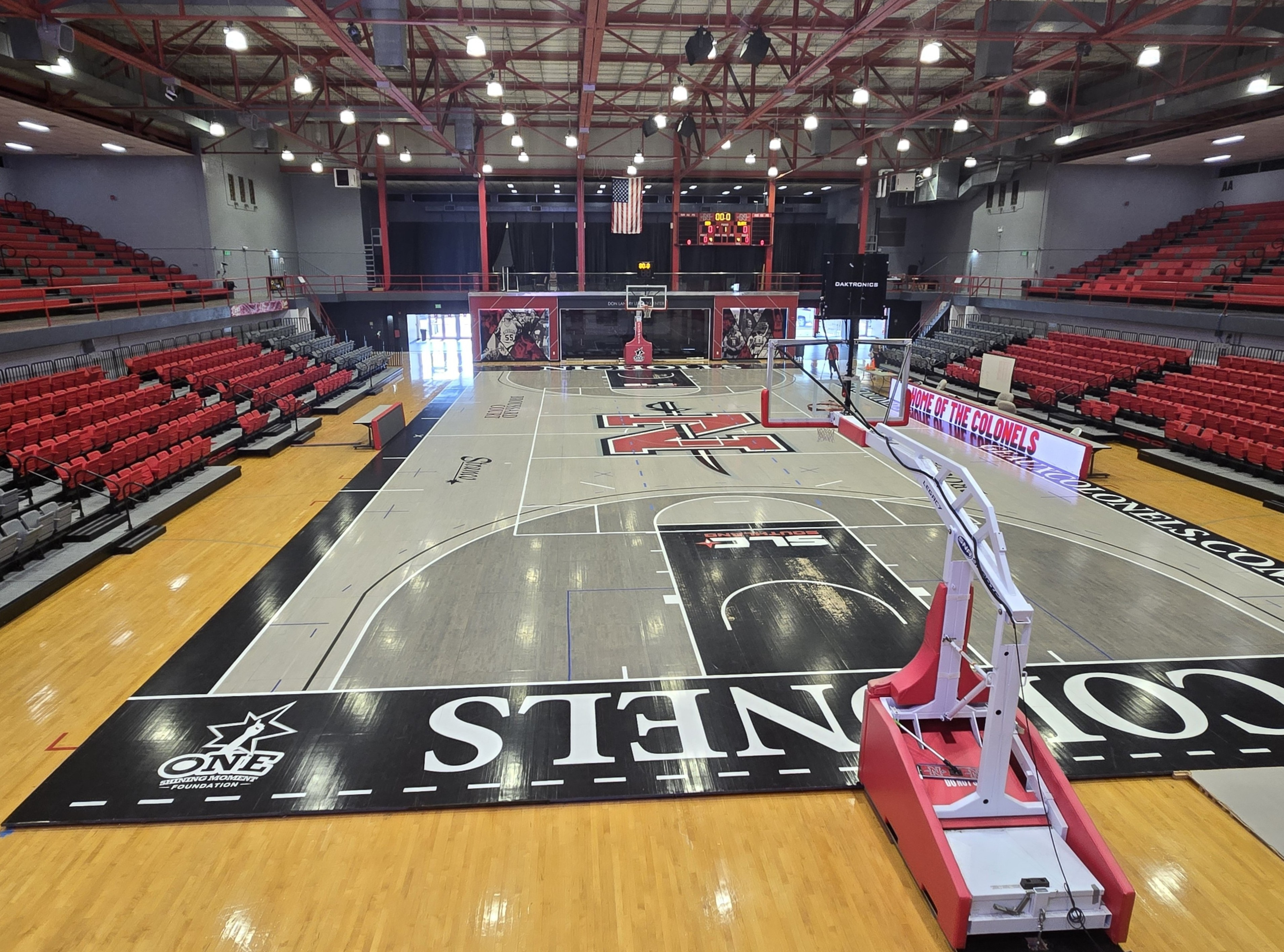
Stopher Gymnasium Broussard Court and Don Landry Legacy Center

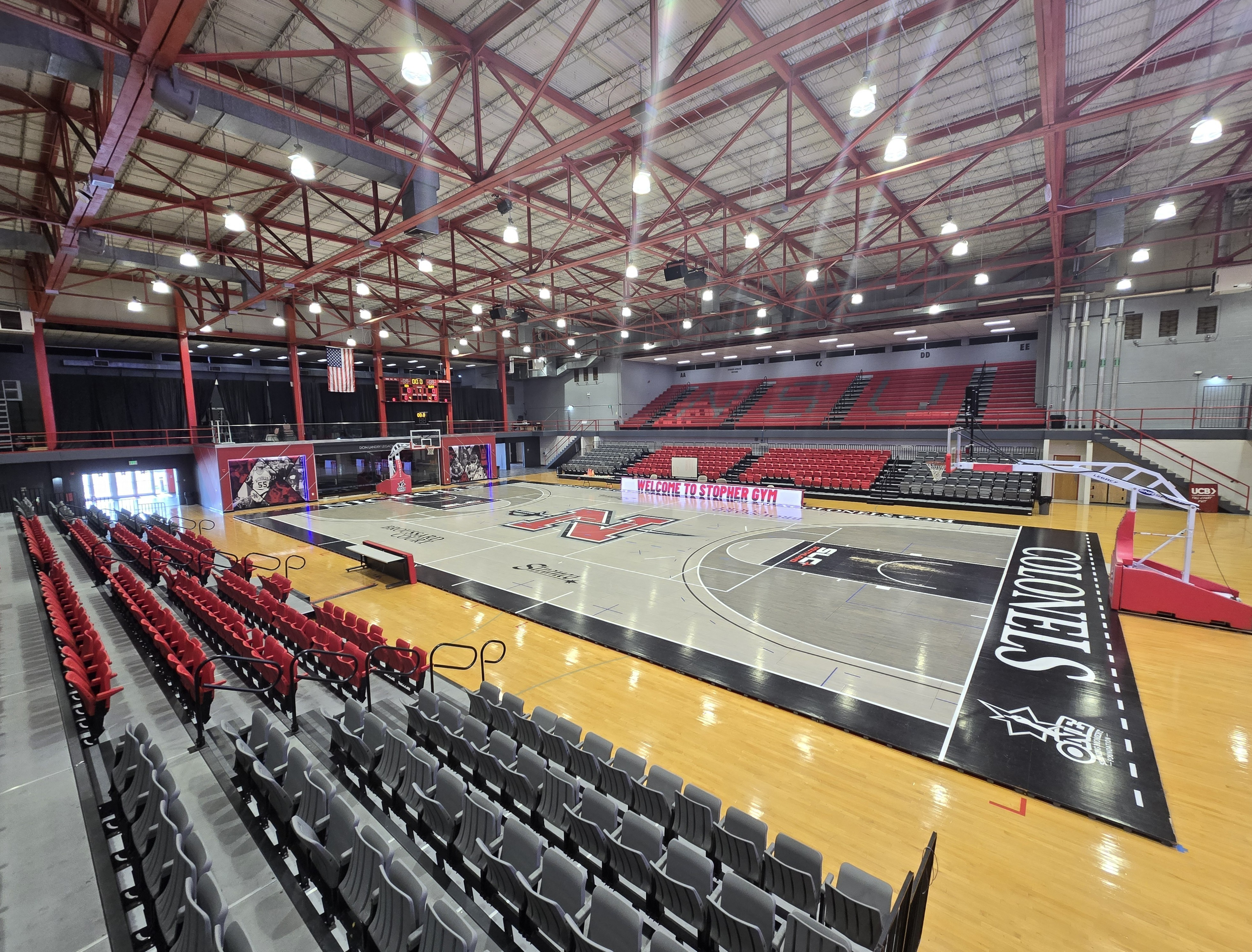
Stopher Gymnasium Broussard Court and Don Landry Legacy Center, Home Corner

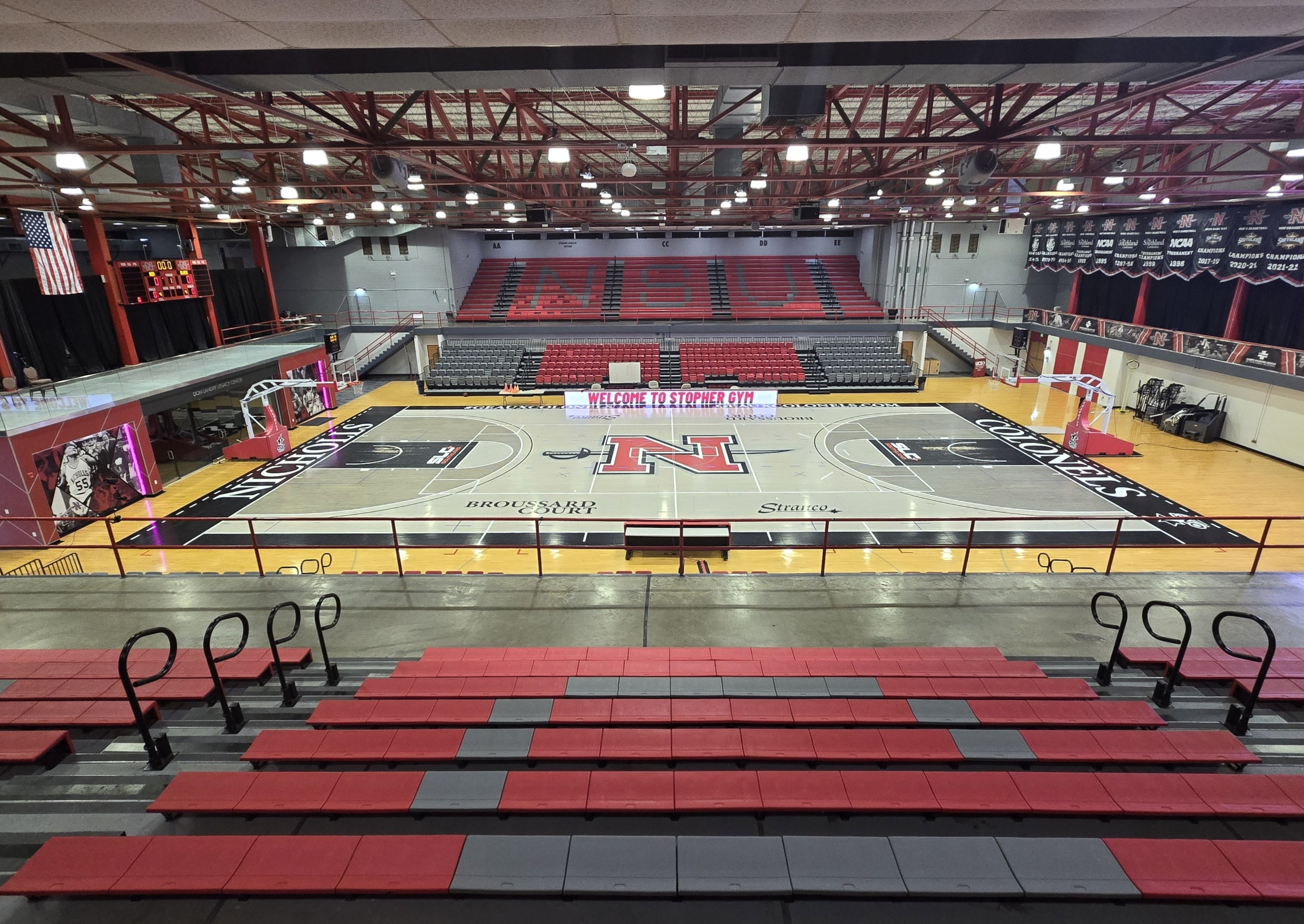
Broussard Court at Stopher Gymnasium

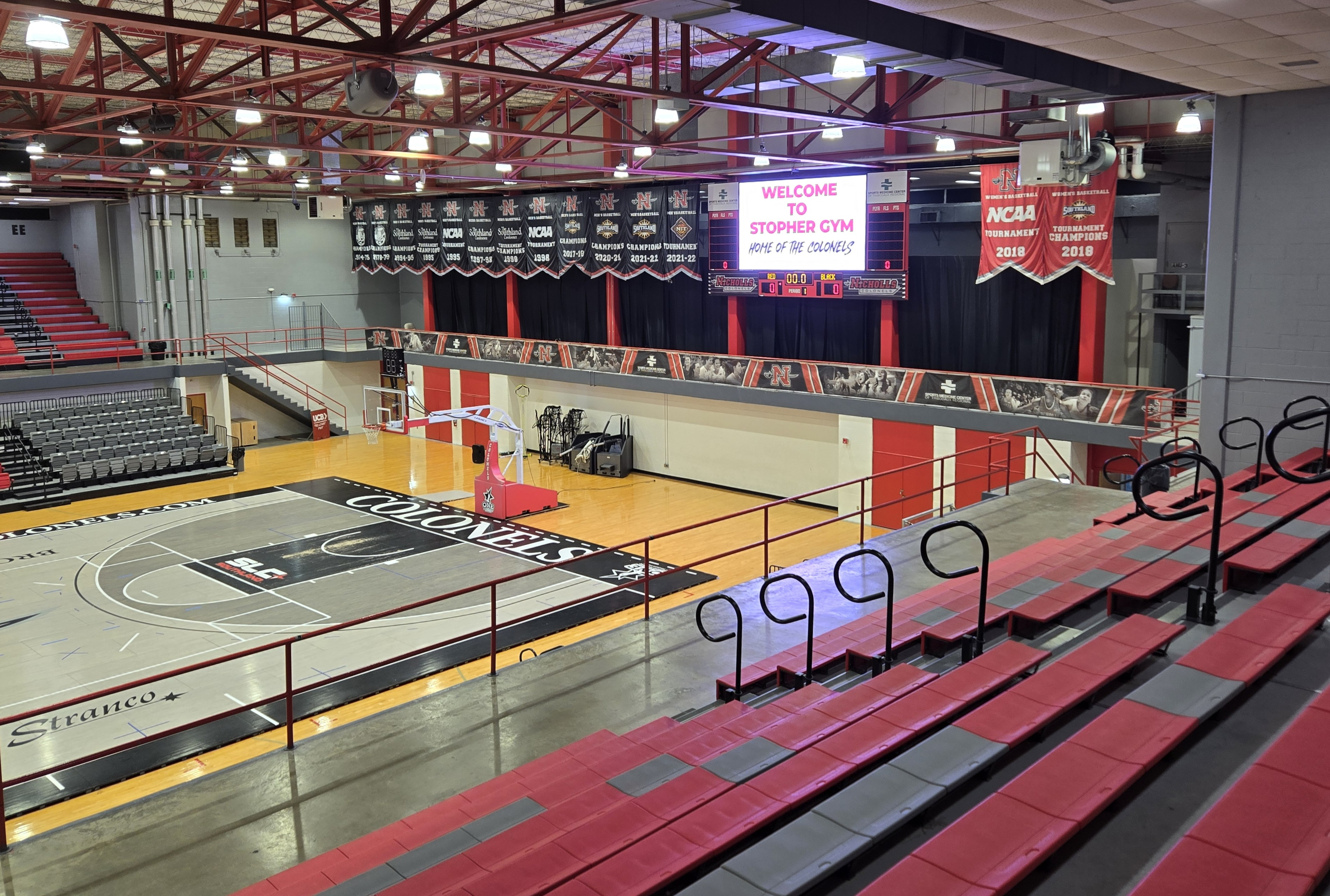
Stopher Gymnasium Banners

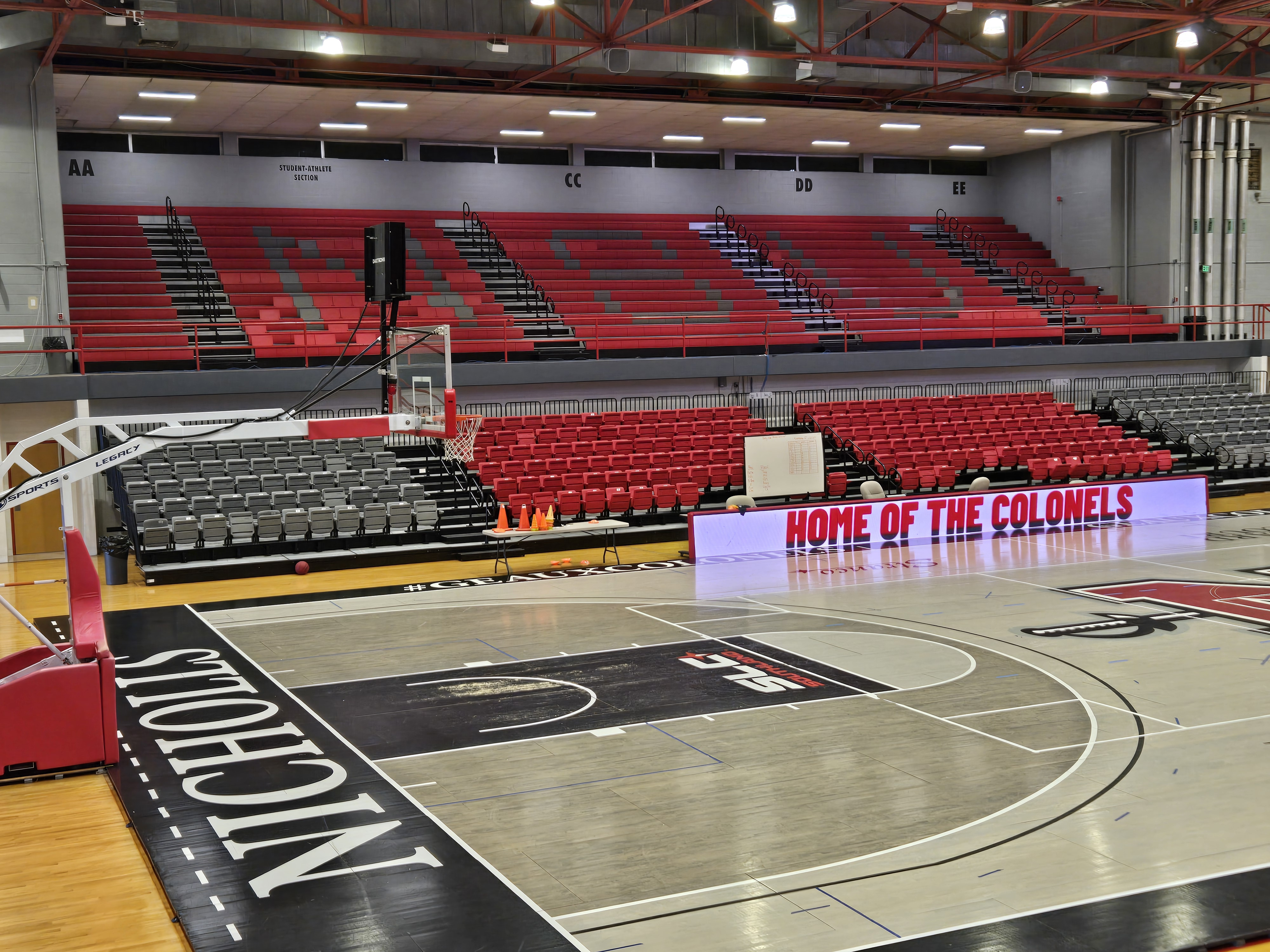
Stopher Gymnasium Team Benches

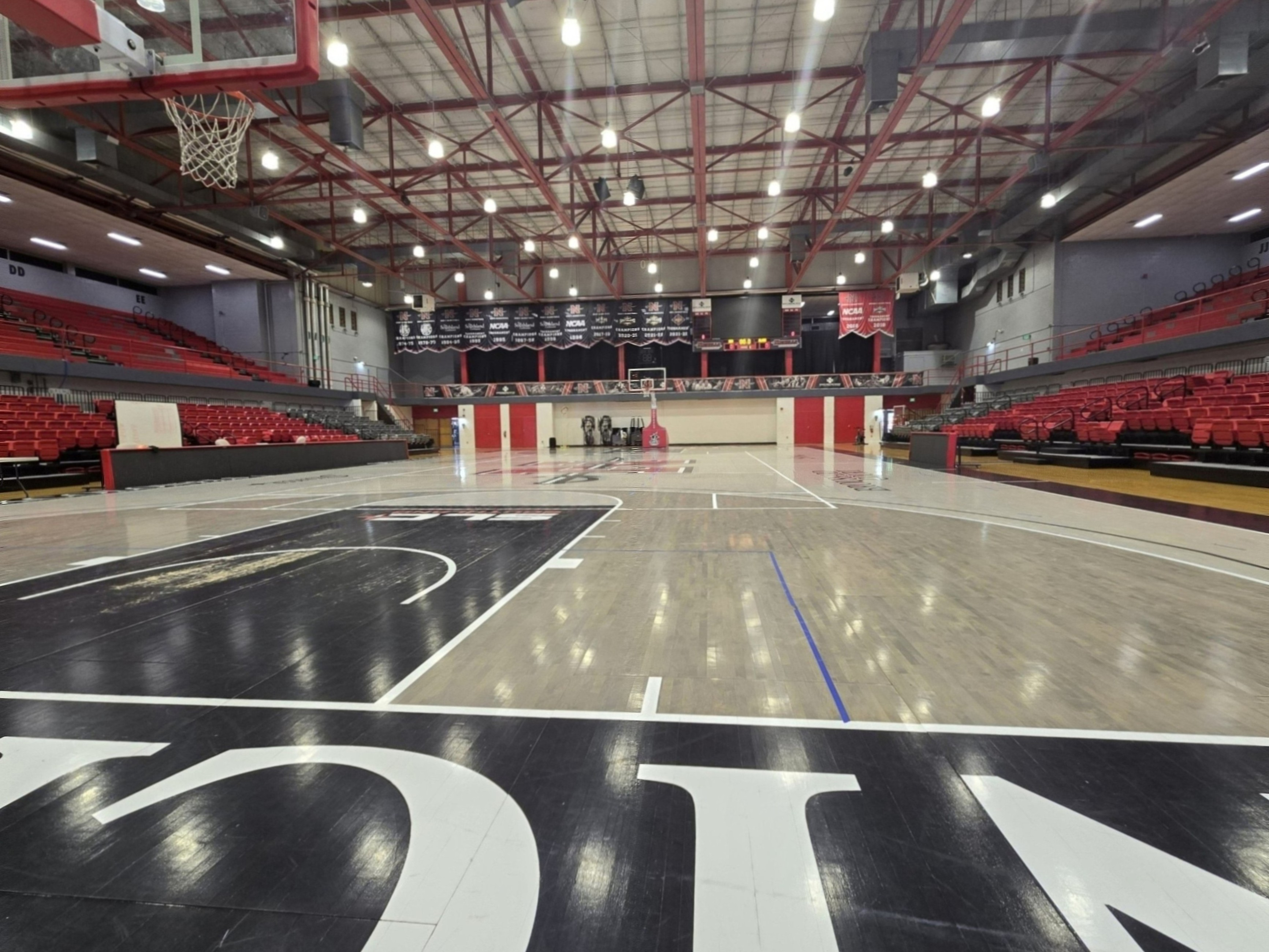
Stopher Gymnasium Baseline of Broussard Court

== See also ==
- List of NCAA Division I basketball arenas
- List of indoor arenas in the United States
- List of music venues
