= 1991 Northern Arizona Lumberjacks football team =

American college football season

1991 Northern Arizona Lumberjacks football
- Conference: Big Sky Conference
- Record: 3–8 (1–7 Big Sky)
- Head coach: Steve Axman (2nd season)
- Home stadium: Walkup Skydome

1991 Big Sky Conference football standings
	Conf.					Overall
Team	W		L		T	W		L		T
No. 1 Nevada $^	8	–	0	–	0	12	–	1	–	0
No. 15 Weber State ^	6	–	2	–	0	8	–	4	–	0
Montana	6	–	2	–	0	7	–	4	–	0
Boise State	4	–	4	–	0	7	–	4	–	0
Idaho	4	–	4	–	0	6	–	5	–	0
Eastern Washington	4	–	4	–	0	5	–	6	–	0
Idaho State	2	–	6	–	0	3	–	7	–	1
Northern Arizona	1	–	7	–	0	3	–	8	–	0
Montana State	1	–	7	–	0	2	–	9	–	0
$ – Conference champion; ^ – NCAA Division I-AA playoff participant; Rankings from NCAA Division I-AA Poll

The 1991 Northern Arizona Lumberjacks football team represented Northern Arizona University as a member of the Big Sky Conference during the 1991 NCAA Division I-AA football season. Led by second-year head coach Steve Axman, the Lumberjacks compiled an overall record of 3–8, with a mark of 1–7 in conference play, and finished tied for eighth in the Big Sky.

== Schedule ==
Date	Opponent	Site	Result	Attendance	Source
August 31	Eastern New Mexico*	Walkup Skydome; Flagstaff, AZ	W 22–15	6,886	
September 7	New Mexico Highlands*	Walkup Skydome; Flagstaff, AZ	W 65–12	5,892	
September 14	at Weber State	Wildcat Stadium; Ogden, UT	L 38–43	8,296	
September 28	at Akron*	Rubber Bowl; Akron, OH	L 14–49	7,054	
October 5	at Idaho State	Holt Arena; Pocatello, ID	L 14–45	6,517	
October 12	Montana State	Walkup Skydome; Flagstaff, AZ	W 27–16	8,506	
October 19	at No. 13 Boise State	Bronco Stadium; Boise, ID	L 14–57	21,228	
October 26	Montana	Walkup Skydome; Flagstaff, AZ	L 27–34	7,403	
November 2	at Eastern Washington	Woodward Field; Cheney, WA	L 29–44	2,748	
November 9	Idaho	Walkup Skydome; Flagstaff, AZ	L 28–44	4,870	
November 16	No. 1 Nevada	Walkup Skydome; Flagstaff, AZ	L 16–45	3,679	
*Non-conference game; Rankings from NCAA Division I-AA Football Committee Poll released prior to the game
