= 1991 Idaho State Bengals football team =

American college football season

1991 Idaho State Bengals football
- Conference: Big Sky Conference
- Record: 3–7–1 (2–6 Big Sky)
- Head coach: Garth Hall (4th season)
- Home stadium: Holt Arena

1991 Big Sky Conference football standings
	Conf.					Overall
Team	W		L		T	W		L		T
No. 1 Nevada $^	8	–	0	–	0	12	–	1	–	0
No. 15 Weber State ^	6	–	2	–	0	8	–	4	–	0
Montana	6	–	2	–	0	7	–	4	–	0
Boise State	4	–	4	–	0	7	–	4	–	0
Idaho	4	–	4	–	0	6	–	5	–	0
Eastern Washington	4	–	4	–	0	5	–	6	–	0
Idaho State	2	–	6	–	0	3	–	7	–	1
Northern Arizona	1	–	7	–	0	3	–	8	–	0
Montana State	1	–	7	–	0	2	–	9	–	0
$ – Conference champion; ^ – NCAA Division I-AA playoff participant; Rankings from NCAA Division I-AA Poll

The 1991 Idaho State Bengals football team represented Idaho State University as a member of the Big Sky Conference during the 1991 NCAA Division I-AA football season. Led by fourth-year head coach Garth Hall, the Bengals compiled an overall record of 3–7–1, with a mark of 2–6 in conference play, and finished seventh in the Big Sky.

== Schedule ==
Date	Opponent	Site	Result	Attendance	Source
September 7	Mesa State*	Holt Arena; Pocatello, ID	W 38–7	5,085	
September 14	at Kansas State*	KSU Stadium; Manhattan, KS	L 7–41	27,126	
September 28	at Montana	Washington–Grizzly Stadium; Missoula, MT	L 13–24	11,459	
October 5	Northern Arizona	Holt Arena; Pocatello, ID	W 45–14	6,517	
October 12	at No. 1 Nevada	Mackay Stadium; Reno, NV	L 20–41	22,630	
October 19	Idaho	Holt Arena; Pocatello, ID (rivalry)	L 21–46	8,069	
October 26	Montana State	Holt Arena; Pocatello, ID	L 7–16	4,010	
November 2	at No. 15 Boise State	Bronco Stadium; Boise, ID	L 16–38	16,787	
November 9	at Eastern Washington	Woodward Field; Cheney, WA	W 43–36	2,938	
November 16	at Southern Utah*	Thunderbird Stadium; Cedar City, UT	T 35–35	3,678	
November 23	No. 16 Weber State	Holt Arena; Pocatello, ID	L 41–60	4,666	
*Non-conference game; Rankings from NCAA Division I-AA Football Committee Poll released prior to the game
