= 1991 Montana State Bobcats football team =

American college football season

1991 Montana State Bobcats football
- Conference: Big Sky Conference
- Record: 2–9 (1–7 Big Sky)
- Head coach: Earle Solomonson (5th season)
- Home stadium: Sales Stadium

1991 Big Sky Conference football standings
	Conf.					Overall
Team	W		L		T	W		L		T
No. 1 Nevada $^	8	–	0	–	0	12	–	1	–	0
No. 15 Weber State ^	6	–	2	–	0	8	–	4	–	0
Montana	6	–	2	–	0	7	–	4	–	0
Boise State	4	–	4	–	0	7	–	4	–	0
Idaho	4	–	4	–	0	6	–	5	–	0
Eastern Washington	4	–	4	–	0	5	–	6	–	0
Idaho State	2	–	6	–	0	3	–	7	–	1
Northern Arizona	1	–	7	–	0	3	–	8	–	0
Montana State	1	–	7	–	0	2	–	9	–	0
$ – Conference champion; ^ – NCAA Division I-AA playoff participant; Rankings from NCAA Division I-AA Poll

The 1991 Montana State Bobcats football team was an American football team that represented Montana State University in the Big Sky Conference during the 1991 NCAA Division I-AA football season. In their fifth and final season under head coach Earle Solomonson, the Bobcats compiled a 2–9 record (1–7 against Big Sky opponents) and finished in a tie for last place in the Big Sky.

== Schedule ==
Date	Opponent	Site	Result	Attendance	Source
August 31	Minnesota Duluth*	Sales Stadium; Bozeman, MT	W 30–14	9,211	
September 7	Sam Houston State*	Sales Stadium; Bozeman, MT	L 23–26	9,427	
September 14	Sacramento State*	Sales Stadium; Bozeman, MT	L 17–19	5,437	
September 21	No. 2 Idaho	Sales Stadium; Bozeman, MT	L 14–48	10,847	
September 28	at No. 1 Nevada	Mackay Stadium; Reno, NV	L 12–54	18,005	
October 5	Weber State^{†}	Sales Stadium; Bozeman, MT	L 25–36	10,167	
October 12	at Northern Arizona	Walkup Skydome; Flagstaff, AZ	L 16–27	8,506	
October 26	at Idaho State	Holt Arena; Pocatello, ID	W 16–7	4,010	
November 2	Montana	Sales Stadium; Bozeman, MT (rivalry)	L 9–16	14,000	
November 9	at No. 13 Boise State	Bronco Stadium; Boise, ID	L 14–31	17,032	
November 16	Eastern Washington	Sales Stadium; Bozeman, MT	L 21–22	3,307	
*Non-conference game; ^{†}Homecoming; Rankings from NCAA Division I-AA Football Committee Poll released prior to the game
