= 1991 Boise State Broncos football team =

American college football season

1991 Boise State Broncos football
- Conference: Big Sky Conference
- Record: 7–4 (4–4 Big Sky)
- Head coach: Skip Hall (5th season)
- Defensive coordinator: Jim Fleming (2nd season)
- Home stadium: Bronco Stadium

1991 Big Sky Conference football standings
	Conf.					Overall
Team	W		L		T	W		L		T
No. 1 Nevada $^	8	–	0	–	0	12	–	1	–	0
No. 15 Weber State ^	6	–	2	–	0	8	–	4	–	0
Montana	6	–	2	–	0	7	–	4	–	0
Boise State	4	–	4	–	0	7	–	4	–	0
Idaho	4	–	4	–	0	6	–	5	–	0
Eastern Washington	4	–	4	–	0	5	–	6	–	0
Idaho State	2	–	6	–	0	3	–	7	–	1
Northern Arizona	1	–	7	–	0	3	–	8	–	0
Montana State	1	–	7	–	0	2	–	9	–	0
$ – Conference champion; ^ – NCAA Division I-AA playoff participant; Rankings from NCAA Division I-AA Poll

The 1991 Boise State Broncos football team represented Boise State University in the 1991 NCAA Division I-AA football season. The Broncos competed in the Big Sky Conference and played their home games on campus at Bronco Stadium in Boise, Idaho. The Broncos were led by fifth-year head coach Skip Hall, Boise State finished the season 7–4 overall and 4–4 in conference. The Broncos won all of their home games, and lost the rest.

== Schedule ==
Date	Time	Opponent	Rank	Site	Result	Attendance	Source
September 7		Liberty*	No. 14	Bronco Stadium; Boise, ID	W 35–14	20,206	
September 14		Long Beach State*	No. 11	Bronco Stadium; Boise, ID	W 48–14	20,824	
September 21	7:00 p.m.	Eastern Washington	No. 6	Bronco Stadium; Boise, ID	W 31–17	21,487	
September 28		Stephen F. Austin*	No. 5	Bronco Stadium; Boise, ID	W 38–7	20,841	
October 12		at Montana	No. 4	Washington–Grizzly Stadium; Missoula, MT	L 7–21	14,170	
October 19		Northern Arizona	No. 13	Bronco Stadium; Boise, ID	W 57–14	21,228	
October 26		at No. 1 Nevada	No. 10	Mackay Stadium; Reno, NV (rivalry)	L 14–17	27,668	
November 2		Idaho State	No. 15	Bronco Stadium; Boise, ID	W 38–16	16,787	
November 9		Montana State	No. 13	Bronco Stadium; Boise, ID	W 31–14	17,032	
November 16		at No. T–20 Weber State	No. 9	Wildcat Stadium; Ogden, UT	L 32–35	5,765	
November 23	2:00 p.m.	at Idaho	No. 19	Kibbie Dome; Moscow, ID (rivalry)	L 24–28	15,000	
*Non-conference game; Rankings from NCAA Division I-AA Football Committee Poll released prior to the game; All times are in Mountain time

== After the season ==
=== NFL draft ===
The following Broncos were selected in the 1992 NFL draft following the season.

Round	Pick	Player	Position	NFL team
5	137	Frank Robinson	Defensive back	Denver Broncos
9	234	Larry Stayner	Tight end	Seattle Seahawks
