= 1991 Eastern Washington Eagles football team =

American college football season

1991 Eastern Washington Eagles football
- Conference: Big Sky Conference
- Record: 5–6 (4–4 Big Sky)
- Head coach: Dick Zornes (13th season)
- Home stadium: Woodward Field

1991 Big Sky Conference football standings
	Conf.					Overall
Team	W		L		T	W		L		T
No. 1 Nevada $^	8	–	0	–	0	12	–	1	–	0
No. 15 Weber State ^	6	–	2	–	0	8	–	4	–	0
Montana	6	–	2	–	0	7	–	4	–	0
Boise State	4	–	4	–	0	7	–	4	–	0
Idaho	4	–	4	–	0	6	–	5	–	0
Eastern Washington	4	–	4	–	0	5	–	6	–	0
Idaho State	2	–	6	–	0	3	–	7	–	1
Northern Arizona	1	–	7	–	0	3	–	8	–	0
Montana State	1	–	7	–	0	2	–	9	–	0
$ – Conference champion; ^ – NCAA Division I-AA playoff participant; Rankings from NCAA Division I-AA Poll

The 1991 Eastern Washington Eagles football team was an American football team that represented Eastern Washington University as a member of the Big Sky Conference during the 1991 NCAA Division I-AA football season. Led by 13th-year head coach Dick Zornes, the Eagles compiled an overall record of 5–6, with a mark of 4–4 in conference play, and finished tied for fourth in the Big Sky.

== Schedule ==
Date	Opponent	Site	Result	Attendance	Source
September 7	Cal State Northridge*	Woodward Field; Cheney, WA	W 20–13	3,028	
September 14	at Eastern Illinois*	O'Brien Stadium; Charleston, IL	L 12–30	5,822	
September 21	at No. 6 Boise State	Bronco Stadium; Boise, ID	L 17–31	21,487	
September 28	at Weber State	Wildcat Stadium; Ogden, UT	L 59–63	4,567	
October 5	Montana	Woodward Field; Cheney, WA (rivalry)	W 20–17	5,416	
October 12	Portland State*	Woodward Field; Cheney, WA	L 23–35	4,674	
October 19	No. 1 Nevada	Woodward Field; Cheney, WA	L 14–51	4,704	
October 26	at Idaho	Kibbie Dome; Moscow, ID	W 34–31 ^{2OT}	14,800	
November 2	Northern Arizona	Woodward Field; Cheney, WA	W 44–29	2,748	
November 9	Idaho State	Woodward Field; Cheney, WA	L 36–43	2,938	
November 16	at Montana State	Sales Stadium; Bozeman, MT	W 22–21	3,307	
*Non-conference game; Rankings from NCAA Division I-AA Football Committee Poll released prior to the game
