= Dennis Parker =

American football player and coach (born 1950)

Current position
- Title: Head coach
- Team: Idabel HS (OK)

Biographical details
- Born: March 23, 1950 (age 76); Idabel, Oklahoma, U.S.

Playing career
- c. 1970: Southeastern Oklahoma State
- Position: Lineman

Coaching career (HC unless noted)
- 1975–1976: Oliver Wendell Holmes HS (TX)
- 1977–1981: Southeast Missouri State (assistant)
- 1982–1983: Judson HS (TX) (OC)
- 1984–1990: Marshall HS (TX)
- 1991–1993: North Texas
- 1994–1998: Cleburne HS (TX)
- 2004–2006: Mesa HS (AZ)
- 2007–2009: Texas Lutheran
- 2014–2017: Idabel HS (OK)

Head coaching record
- Overall: 17–45–1 (college)

Dennis Parker (born March 23, 1950) is an American football coach. He served as the head football coach at the University of North Texas from 1991 to 1993 and at Texas Lutheran University from 2007 to 2009, compiling a career college football record of 17–45–1.

Parker began his coaching career in the high school ranks as an assistant at San Antonio Edison, San Antonio Holmes and Converse Judson. At Converse Judson, Parker was the offensive coordinator under coach Frank Arnold, as the team won the 1983 state championship. In 1984, he took over head coaching duties at Marshall, guiding the school to a 56–27–1 record in seven years. In 1990, his team won a state championship versus Converse Judson. Parker was named the Texas High School Coach of the Year in 1988 and in 1990.

Moving into the collegiate ranks, Parker succeeded Corky Nelson at North Texas in 1991. He left in 1993 after three losing seasons. He later coached at Cleburne and Mesa before becoming head coach at Texas Lutheran. On November 9, 2009, Parker resigned as head coach at Texas Lutheran, where he had three more losing seasons.

== Head coaching record ==
=== College ===
Year	Team	Overall	Conference	Standing	Bowl/playoffs
North Texas Mean Green (Southland Conference) (1991–1993)
1991	North Texas	3–7–1	2–5	T–6th	
1992	North Texas	4–7	3–4	5th	
1993	North Texas	4–7	2–5	T–5th	
North Texas:		11–21–1	7–14		
Texas Lutheran Bulldogs (American Southwest Conference) (2007–2009)
2007	Texas Lutheran	2–8	2–6	7th	
2008	Texas Lutheran	4–6	3–5	6th	
2009	Texas Lutheran	0–10	0–8	9th	
Texas Lutheran:		6–24	5–19		
Total:		17–45–1			
