= 1991 McNeese State Cowboys football team =

American college football season

1991 McNeese State Cowboys football

Southland co-champion

NCAA Division I-AA First Round, L 16–22 vs. Nevada
- Conference: Southland Conference
- Record: 6–4–2 (4–1–2 Southland)
- Head coach: Bobby Keasler (2nd season)
- Offensive coordinator: Mike Santiago (2nd season)
- Defensive coordinator: Kirby Bruchhaus (2nd season)
- Home stadium: Cowboy Stadium

1991 Southland Conference football standings
	Conf.					Overall
Team	W		L		T	W		L		T
No. 12 Sam Houston State +^	5	–	2	–	0	8	–	3	–	1
No. 19 McNeese State +^	4	–	1	–	2	6	–	4	–	2
No. 18 NE Louisiana	4	–	2	–	1	7	–	3	–	1
SW Texas State	4	–	3	–	0	7	–	4	–	0
Northwestern State	4	–	3	–	0	6	–	5	–	0
Nicholls State	2	–	5	–	0	4	–	7	–	0
North Texas	2	–	5	–	0	3	–	7	–	1
Stephen F. Austin	1	–	5	–	1	2	–	8	–	1
+ – Conference co-champions; ^ – NCAA Division I-AA playoff participant; Rankings from NCAA Division I-AA Football Committee poll

The 1991 McNeese State Cowboys football team was an American football team that represented McNeese State University as a member of the Southland Conference (Southland) during the 1991 NCAA Division I-AA football season. In their second year under head coach Bobby Keasler, the team compiled an overall record of 6–4–2, with a mark of 4–1–2 in conference play, and finished as Southland co-champion.

== Schedule ==
Date	Opponent	Rank	Site	Result	Attendance	Source
September 7	at No. 7 Northern Iowa*		UNI-Dome; Cedar Falls, IA	L 5-30	9,123	
September 14	at No. 20 Southwest Missouri State*		Briggs Stadium; Springfield, MO	L 3–7	15,579	
September 21	Montana*		Cowboy Stadium; Lake Charles, LA	W 26–21	15,175	
October 5	Nicholls State		Cowboy Stadium; Lake Charles, LA	W 21–3	14,621	
October 12	at No. 10 Northeast Louisiana		Malone Stadium; Monroe, LA	T 10–10		
October 19	at Northwestern State		Harry Turpin Stadium; Natchitoches, LA (rivalry)	L 3–20	10,100	
October 26	Southwest Texas State		Cowboy Stadium; Lake Charles, LA	W 19–18		
November 2	North Texas		Cowboy Stadium; Lake Charles, LA	W 41–3		
November 9	Stephen F. Austin	No. 19	Cowboy Stadium; Lake Charles, LA	T 7–7	10,261	
November 16	at No. 8 Sam Houston State		Bowers Stadium; Huntsville, TX	W 19–17		
November 23	Tennessee–Martin*	No. T–19	Cowboy Stadium; Lake Charles, LA	W 17–16		
November 30	at No. 1 Nevada*	No. 19	Mackay Stadium; Reno, NV (NCAA Division I-AA First Round)	L 16–22	15,962	
*Non-conference game; Rankings from NCAA Division I-AA Football Committee Poll released prior to the game

== Roster ==
1991 McNeese State Cowboys football team roster
Players			Coaches
Offense: Pos. / # / Name / Class	Defense: Pos. / # / Name / Class	Special teams: Pos. / # / Name / Class; K / 1 / Eric Roberts / Sr	Head coach: Bobby Keasler; Coordinators/assistant coaches Legend: (C) Team captain; (S) Suspended; (I) Ineligible; Injured; Redshirt
