= 1991 Sam Houston State Bearkats football team =

American college football season

1991 Sam Houston State Bearkats football

Southland co-champion

NCAA Division I-AA First Round, L 19–20 vs. Middle Tennessee
- Conference: Southland Conference
- Record: 8–3–1 (5–2 Southland)
- Head coach: Ron Randleman (10th season)
- Defensive coordinator: Mike Lucas (2nd season)
- Home stadium: Bowers Stadium

1991 Southland Conference football standings
	Conf.					Overall
Team	W		L		T	W		L		T
No. 12 Sam Houston State +^	5	–	2	–	0	8	–	3	–	1
No. 19 McNeese State +^	4	–	1	–	2	6	–	4	–	2
No. 18 NE Louisiana	4	–	2	–	1	7	–	3	–	1
SW Texas State	4	–	3	–	0	7	–	4	–	0
Northwestern State	4	–	3	–	0	6	–	5	–	0
Nicholls State	2	–	5	–	0	4	–	7	–	0
North Texas	2	–	5	–	0	3	–	7	–	1
Stephen F. Austin	1	–	5	–	1	2	–	8	–	1
+ – Conference co-champions; ^ – NCAA Division I-AA playoff participant; Rankings from NCAA Division I-AA Football Committee poll

The 1991 Sam Houston State Bearkats football team represented Sam Houston State University as a member of the Southland Conference during the 1991 NCAA Division I-AA football season. Led by tenth-year head coach Ron Randleman, the Bearkats compiled an overall record of 8–3–1 with a mark of 5–2 in conference play, and finished tied for first in the Southland.

== Schedule ==
Date	Opponent	Rank	Site	Result	Attendance	Source
September 7	at Montana State*		Sales Stadium; Bozeman, MT	W 26–23	9,427	
September 14	Texas Southern*	No. 17	Bowers Stadium; Huntsville, TX	W 37–6		
September 21	at Angelo State*	No. 12	San Angelo Stadium; San Angelo, TX	W 16–6		
September 28	at Western Illinois*	No. 11	Hanson Field; Macomb, IL	T 21–21	8,773	
October 12	Nicholls State	No. 8	Bowers Stadium; Huntsville, TX	W 28–19		
October 19	No. 15 Northeast Louisiana	No. 6	Bowers Stadium; Huntsville, TX	W 27–15		
October 26	at North Texas	No. 5	Fouts Field; Denton, TX	W 14–6		
November 2	at Stephen F. Austin	No. 5	Homer Bryce Stadium; Nacogdoches, TX (Battle of the Piney Woods)	L 3–13	6,349	
November 9	Northwestern State	No. 10	Bowers Stadium; Huntsville, TX	W 13–3		
November 16	No. 19 McNeese State	No. 8	Bowers Stadium; Huntsville, TX	L 17–19		
November 23	at Southwest Texas State	No. 13	Bobcat Stadium; San Marcos, TX (rivalry)	W 20–14		
November 30	at No. 9 Middle Tennessee*	No. 12	Johnny "Red" Floyd Stadium; Murfreesboro, TN (NCAA Division I-AA First Round)	L 19–20 ^{OT}	2,000	
*Non-conference game; Rankings from NCAA Division I-AA Football Committee Poll released prior to the game
