= 1991 Northeast Louisiana Indians football team =

American college football season

1991 Northeast Louisiana Indians football
- Conference: Southland Conference
- Record: 7–3–1 (4–2–1 SLC)
- Head coach: Dave Roberts (3rd season)
- Offensive coordinator: Norman Joseph (2nd season)
- Home stadium: Malone Stadium

1991 Southland Conference football standings
	Conf.					Overall
Team	W		L		T	W		L		T
No. 12 Sam Houston State +^	5	–	2	–	0	8	–	3	–	1
No. 19 McNeese State +^	4	–	1	–	2	6	–	4	–	2
No. 18 NE Louisiana	4	–	2	–	1	7	–	3	–	1
SW Texas State	4	–	3	–	0	7	–	4	–	0
Northwestern State	4	–	3	–	0	6	–	5	–	0
Nicholls State	2	–	5	–	0	4	–	7	–	0
North Texas	2	–	5	–	0	3	–	7	–	1
Stephen F. Austin	1	–	5	–	1	2	–	8	–	1
+ – Conference co-champions; ^ – NCAA Division I-AA playoff participant; Rankings from NCAA Division I-AA Football Committee poll

The 1991 Northeast Louisiana Indians football team was an American football team that represented Northeast Louisiana University (now known as the University of Louisiana at Monroe) as part of the Southland Conference during the 1991 NCAA Division I-AA football season. In their third year under head coach Dave Roberts, the team compiled a 7–3–1 record.

== Schedule ==
Date	Opponent	Site	Result	Attendance	Source
August 31	at Southwestern Louisiana*	Cajun Field; Lafayette, LA	W 21–10	23,486	
September 7	Nicholls State	Malone Stadium; Monroe, LA	L 10–15		
September 14	Georgia Southern*	Malone Stadium; Monroe, LA	W 21–13	16,281	
September 28	Mississippi College*	Malone Stadium; Monroe, LA	W 17–7		
October 5	at Southwest Texas State	Bobcat Stadium; San Marcos, TX	W 17–8		
October 12	McNeese State	Malone Stadium; Monroe, LA	T 10–10		
October 19	at Sam Houston State	Bowers Stadium; Huntsville, TX	L 15–27		
October 26	at Northwestern State	Harry Turpin Stadium; Natchitoches, LA (rivalry)	W 24–9		
November 2	at Louisiana Tech*	Joe Aillet Stadium; Ruston, LA	L 10–35		
November 16	at Stephen F. Austin	Homer Bryce Stadium; Nacogdoches, TX	W 48–20		
November 23	North Texas	Malone Stadium; Monroe, LA	W 44–21		
*Non-conference game
