= 1991 Idaho Vandals football team =

American college football season

1991 Idaho Vandals football
- Conference: Big Sky Conference
- Record: 6–5 (4–4 Big Sky)
- Head coach: John L. Smith (3rd season)
- Offensive coordinator: Bobby Petrino (2nd season)
- Defensive coordinator: Craig Bray (2nd season)
- Home stadium: Kibbie Dome

1991 Big Sky Conference football standings
	Conf.					Overall
Team	W		L		T	W		L		T
No. 1 Nevada $^	8	–	0	–	0	12	–	1	–	0
No. 15 Weber State ^	6	–	2	–	0	8	–	4	–	0
Montana	6	–	2	–	0	7	–	4	–	0
Boise State	4	–	4	–	0	7	–	4	–	0
Idaho	4	–	4	–	0	6	–	5	–	0
Eastern Washington	4	–	4	–	0	5	–	6	–	0
Idaho State	2	–	6	–	0	3	–	7	–	1
Northern Arizona	1	–	7	–	0	3	–	8	–	0
Montana State	1	–	7	–	0	2	–	9	–	0
$ – Conference champion; ^ – NCAA Division I-AA playoff participant; Rankings from NCAA Division I-AA Poll

The 1991 Idaho Vandals football team represented the University of Idaho in the 1991 NCAA Division I-AA football season. The Vandals were led by third-year head coach John L. Smith, were members of the Big Sky Conference and played their home games at the Kibbie Dome, an indoor facility on campus in Moscow, Idaho.

The Vandals missed the I-AA playoffs for the first time since 1984. Led by sophomore quarterback Doug Nussmeier, Idaho finished the regular season at 6–5 and 4–4 in the Big Sky. The Vandals defeated rival Boise State for the tenth consecutive season.

== Schedule ==
Date	Time	Opponent	Rank	Site	Result	Attendance	Source
September 7	6:00 p.m.	Sonoma State*	No. 3	Kibbie Dome; Moscow, ID	W 49–7	10,000	
September 14	6:00 p.m.	Southwest Texas State*	No. 4	Kibbie Dome; Moscow, ID	W 41–38	10,200	
September 21	12:00 p.m.	at Montana State	No. 2	Reno H. Sales Stadium; Bozeman, MT	W 48–14	10,847	
September 28	6:00 p.m.	No. T–17 Northern Iowa*	No. 2	Kibbie Dome; Moscow, ID	L 14–36	11,500	
October 5	1:00 p.m.	No. 1 Nevada	No. 14	Kibbie Dome; Moscow, ID	L 23–31	14,500	
October 12	5:00 p.m.	at Weber State	No. 19	Wildcat Stadium; Ogden, UT	L 17–45	11,263	
October 19		at Idaho State		Holt Arena; Pocatello, ID (rivalry)	W 46–21	8,069	
October 26	1:00 p.m.	Eastern Washington^{†}		Kibbie Dome; Moscow, ID	L 31–34 ^{2OT}	14,800	
November 9	5:00 p.m.	at Northern Arizona		Walkup Skydome; Flagstaff, AZ	W 44–28	4,870	
November 16	1:00 p.m.	Montana		Kibbie Dome; Moscow, ID (Little Brown Stein)	L 34–35 ^{OT}	9,500	
November 23	1:00 p.m.	No. 19 Boise State		Kibbie Dome; Moscow, ID (rivalry)	W 28–24	15,000	
*Non-conference game; ^{†}Homecoming; Rankings from NCAA Division I-AA Football Committee Poll released prior to the game
