= 1991 Montana Grizzlies football team =

American college football season

1991 Montana Grizzlies football
- Conference: Big Sky Conference
- Record: 7–4 (6–2 Big Sky)
- Head coach: Don Read (6th season)
- Offensive coordinator: Mick Dennehy (1st season)
- Defensive coordinator: Jerome Souers (2nd season)
- Home stadium: Washington–Grizzly Stadium

1991 Big Sky Conference football standings
	Conf.					Overall
Team	W		L		T	W		L		T
No. 1 Nevada $^	8	–	0	–	0	12	–	1	–	0
No. 15 Weber State ^	6	–	2	–	0	8	–	4	–	0
Montana	6	–	2	–	0	7	–	4	–	0
Boise State	4	–	4	–	0	7	–	4	–	0
Idaho	4	–	4	–	0	6	–	5	–	0
Eastern Washington	4	–	4	–	0	5	–	6	–	0
Idaho State	2	–	6	–	0	3	–	7	–	1
Northern Arizona	1	–	7	–	0	3	–	8	–	0
Montana State	1	–	7	–	0	2	–	9	–	0
$ – Conference champion; ^ – NCAA Division I-AA playoff participant; Rankings from NCAA Division I-AA Poll

The 1991 Montana Grizzlies football team was an American football team that represented the University of Montana in the Big Sky Conference during the 1991 NCAA Division I-AA football season. In their sixth year under head coach Don Read, the team compiled a 7–4 record.

== Schedule ==
Date	Opponent	Site	Result	Attendance	Source
September 7	Humboldt State*	Washington–Grizzly Stadium; Missoula, MT	W 38–6	10,299	
September 14	at Louisiana Tech*	Joe Aillet Stadium; Ruston, LA	L 11–21	17,285	
September 21	at McNeese State*	Cowboy Stadium; Lake Charles, LA	L 3–31	15,175	
September 28	Idaho State	Washington–Grizzly Stadium; Missoula, MT	W 24–13	11,459	
October 5	at Eastern Washington	Woodward Field; Cheney, WA (rivalry)	L 17–20	5,416	
October 12	No. 4 Boise State	Washington–Grizzly Stadium; Missoula, MT	W 21–7	14,170	
October 19	No. 18 Weber State	Washington–Grizzly Stadium; Missoula, MT	W 47–38	10,804	
October 26	at Northern Arizona	Walkup Skydome; Flagstaff, AZ	W 34–27	7,403	
November 2	at Montana State	Reno H. Sales Stadium; Bozeman, MT (rivalry)	W 16–9	13,947	
November 9	No. 1 Nevada	Washington–Grizzly Stadium; Missoula, MT	L 28–35 ^{2OT}	12,644	
November 16	at Idaho	Kibbie Dome; Moscow, ID (Little Brown Stein)	W 35–34 ^{OT}	9,500	
*Non-conference game; Rankings from NCAA Division I-AA Football Committee Poll released prior to the game
