= 1991 Weber State Wildcats football team =

American college football season

1991 Weber State Wildcats football

NCAA Division I-AA First Round, L 21–38 vs. Northern Iowa
- Conference: Big Sky Conference
- Record: 8–4 (6–2 Big Sky)
- Head coach: Dave Arslanian (3rd season)
- Home stadium: Wildcat Stadium

1991 Big Sky Conference football standings
	Conf.					Overall
Team	W		L		T	W		L		T
No. 1 Nevada $^	8	–	0	–	0	12	–	1	–	0
No. 15 Weber State ^	6	–	2	–	0	8	–	4	–	0
Montana	6	–	2	–	0	7	–	4	–	0
Boise State	4	–	4	–	0	7	–	4	–	0
Idaho	4	–	4	–	0	6	–	5	–	0
Eastern Washington	4	–	4	–	0	5	–	6	–	0
Idaho State	2	–	6	–	0	3	–	7	–	1
Northern Arizona	1	–	7	–	0	3	–	8	–	0
Montana State	1	–	7	–	0	2	–	9	–	0
$ – Conference champion; ^ – NCAA Division I-AA playoff participant; Rankings from NCAA Division I-AA Poll

The 1991 Weber State Wildcats football team represented Weber State University as a member of the Big Sky Conference during the 1991 NCAA Division I-AA football season. Led by third-year head coach Dave Arslanian and junior quarterback Jamie Martin, the Wildcats compiled an overall record of 8–4 with a mark of 6–2 in conference play, and a placing second in the Big Sky. Weber State advanced to the NCAA Division I-AA Football Championship playoffs for the second time in the program history, where they lost in the first round to Northern Iowa. Martin won the Walter Payton Award, given to the most outstanding offensive player in NCAA Division I-AA.

== Schedule ==
Date	Opponent	Rank	Site	Result	Attendance	Source
August 31	at Air Force*		Falcon Stadium; Colorado Springs, CO	L 31–48	41,294	
September 7	Southern Utah*		Wildcat Stadium; Ogden, UT	W 33–14	4,475	
September 14	Northern Arizona		Wildcat Stadium; Ogden, UT	W 43–38	8,296	
September 28	Eastern Washington		Wildcat Stadium; Ogden, UT	W 63–59	4,567	
October 5	at Montana State		Reno H. Sales Stadium; Bozeman, MT	W 36–25	10,167	
October 12	No. 19 Idaho^{†}		Wildcat Stadium; Ogden, UT	W 45–17	11,263	
October 19	Montana	No. T–17	Washington Grizzly Stadium; Missoula, MT	L 38–47	10,804	
November 2	No. 1 Nevada		Mackay Stadium; Reno, NV	L 49–55	21,031	
November 9	New Mexico Highlands*		Wildcat Stadium; Ogden, UT	W 62–7	3,235	
November 16	No. 9 Boise State	No. T–20	Wildcat Stadium; Ogden, UT	W 35–32	5,765	
November 23	at Idaho State	No. 16	Holt Arena; Pocatello, ID	W 60–41	4,666	
November 30	at No. 4 Northern Iowa*	No. 15	UNI-Dome; Cedar Falls, IA (NCAA Division I-AA First Round)	L 21–38	8,723	
*Non-conference game; ^{†}Homecoming; Rankings from NCAA Division I-AA Football Committee Poll released prior to the game
