= Manning Field at John L. Guidry Stadium =

Multi-purpose stadium in Thibodaux, Louisiana

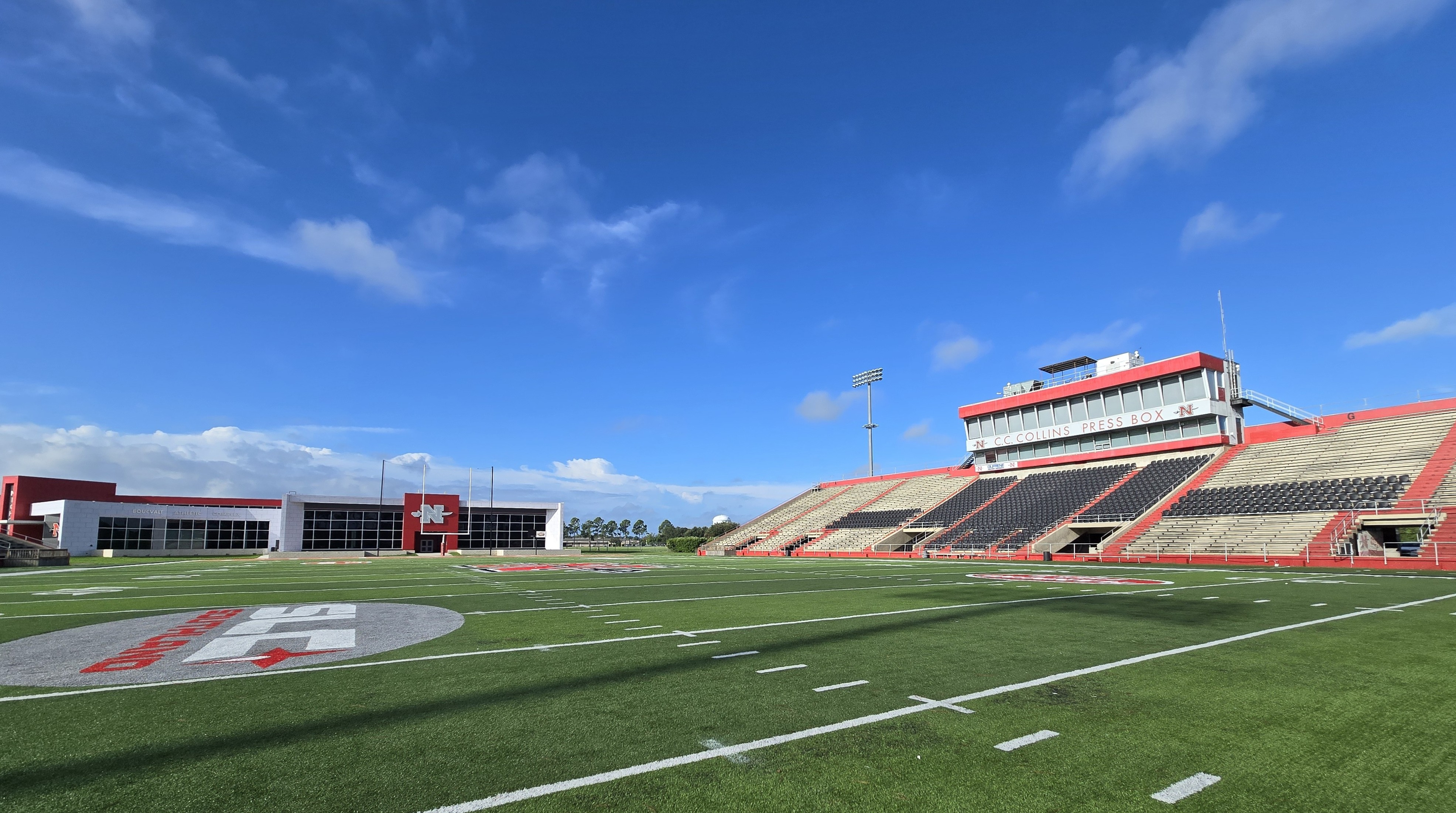
- Manning Field at John L. Guidry Stadium
- Interactive map of Manning Field at John L. Guidry Stadium
- Former names: Colonel Stadium (1972); John L. Guidry Stadium (1973–2006)
- Location: Madewood Dr. and Stadium Dr., Thibodaux, LA
- Coordinates: 29°47′11″N 90°48′15″W
- Owner: Nicholls State University
- Operator: Nicholls Athletics Department
- Capacity: 10,500 (2011–present); 12,800 (1984–2010); 11,600 (1976–1983)
- Surface: GeoGreen Replicated Grass
- Record attendance: 14,125; October 10, 1981 vs. Southern University

Construction
- Groundbreaking: 1971
- Opened: September 16, 1972
- Cost: $2 million

Tenant
- Nicholls Colonels football (NCAA)

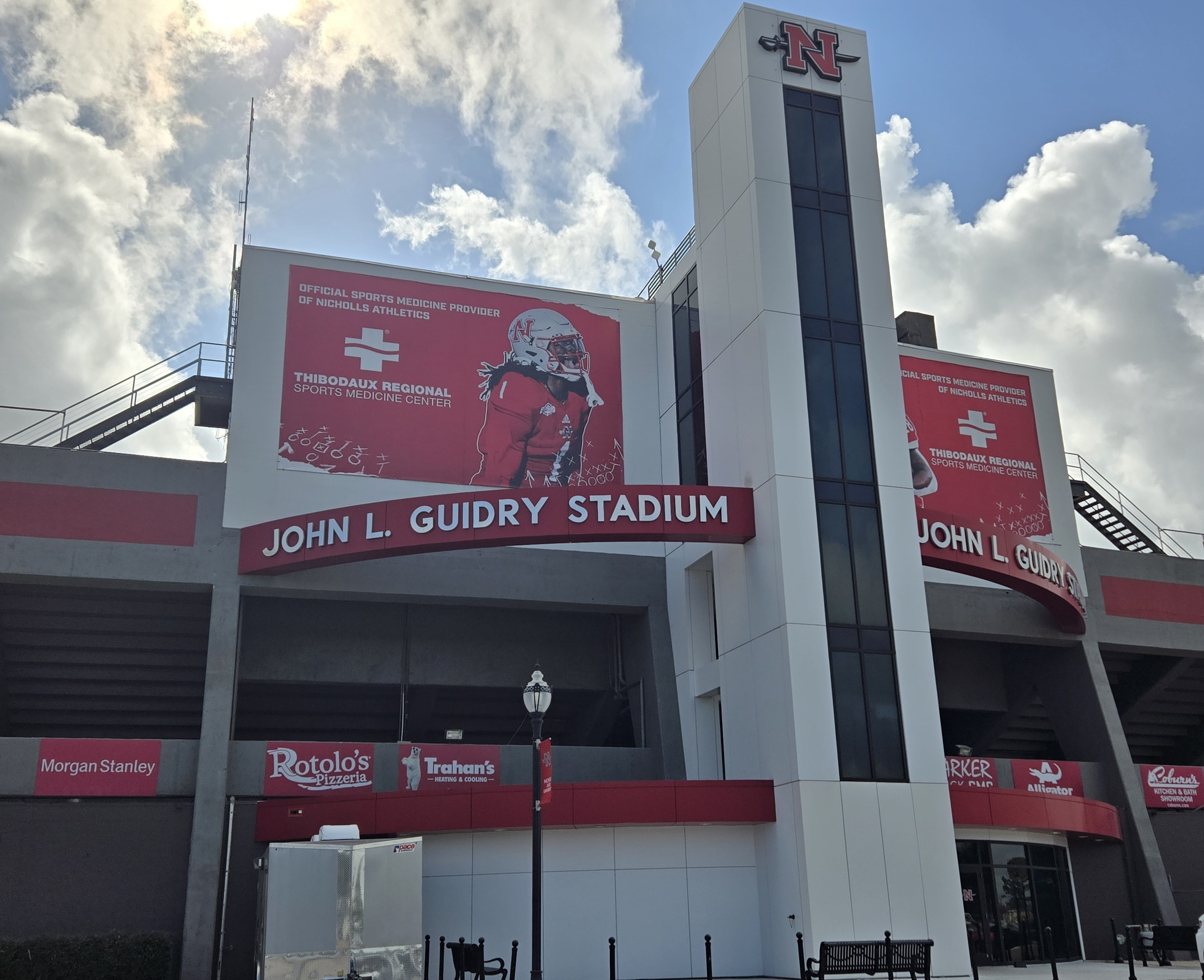
Manning Field at John L. Guidry Stadium

Manning Field at John L. Guidry Stadium is a 10,500-seat multi-purpose stadium in Thibodaux, Louisiana. It is home to the Nicholls Colonels football team of the Southland Conference in the Football Championship Subdivision (FCS). The stadium is named in honor of former state representative John L. Guidry who was instrumental in the establishment of Francis T. Nicholls Junior College. The playing surface is named Manning Field after the Manning family because the family holds the annual Manning Passing Academy football camp at the facility. The current playing surface is GeoGreen Replicated Grass. The stadium was officially dedicated on September 16, 1972.

The stadium features a three-level press box on the west side with a photo deck located on the roof. The president's suite and a 30-seat club level is located on the third level. The second-level houses an area for game management staff, television, radio and coaches' booths and a working press area. On the ground level is the Colonels Club Room. Members use the club room as a hospitality area before home football games as well as for various university functions throughout the year.

The stadium is also the site of LHSAA high school football games, Crawfish Day, Winter Fest and holds marching band competitions.

== History ==
The first game in stadium history was on September 16, 1972, as the Nicholls State football team defeated Ouachita Baptist 12–7.

The New Orleans Saints (NFL) used the stadium for training camp prior to the 1975 season and again from 2000 to 2002. In 2005, John L. Guidry Stadium and the Nicholls State campus became the host of the Manning Passing Academy.

For the 2007 Nicholls State football season, a new AstroTurf playing surface was installed at the stadium. Prior to the start of the 2010 season, a new scoreboard, complete with graphic animation features as well as a new sound system was added. In 2012, the west entrance of the stadium was renovated which included a new entrance into the Colonel Club area and a new ever-present illuminated Nicholls "N".

In 2017, the stadium press box was named C.C. Collins Press Box and a new artificial turf playing surface was installed. The GeoGreen Replicated Grass playing surface featured the Nicholls Athletics logo at midfield, along with Manning Field and Southland Conference logos on each 25-yard-line. Also in 2017, the stadium received a new 31' wide LED video display scoreboard and sound system.

On June 12, 2019, Nicholls announced a new $6.5 million, 20,000-square-foot (1,900 m^{2}) football operations center will be built in the south end zone along with an expansion and renovation of the Frank L. Barker Athletic Building. The football team will move from the Barker Athletic Building to the football operations center starting with the 2020 Nicholls Football season. The football operations center will include a new locker room, players’ lounge, 142-seat team meeting room with stadium-style seating, training room, equipment room, coaches’ and staff offices, position and group meeting rooms, catering kitchen and team lobby. The team meeting room will also function as a gameday club seating area with a large window overlooking the field. Construction of an indoor training facility located behind the football operations center will begin after completion of the football operations center.

== Facilities ==
=== Boucvault Athletic Complex ===
The Boucvault Athletic Complex, a 20,000-square-foot facility in the south end zone of Manning Field at John L. Guidry Stadium. The facility houses football operations that include team locker rooms and training rooms, field coaches' offices and a 110-seat team meeting room. The facility also includes a player’s lounge and Nicholls fans can watch football games from the team meeting room.

=== Gaubert Oil Practice Facility at Shaw Sports Turf/Manning Field ===
The Gaubert Oil Practice Facility at Shaw Sports Turf/Manning Field is a covered 100-yard turf field, plus office and storage space. It is located directly behind the Boucvault Athletic Complex and Manning Field at John L. Guidry Stadium. In partnership with Nicholls Colonels football, the Manning Passing Academy and Shaw Sports Turf, an artificial turf field was installed at the facility.

=== Leonard C. Chabert Strength and Conditioning Facility ===
The Nicholls Colonels Strength and Conditioning facility is located in the Leonard C. Chabert Strength and Conditioning Facility or Leonard C. Chabert Hall. The facility has multi-purpose power stations, weight machines, dumbbell stations, elliptical machines and stationary bikes. It is the strength and conditioning facility and nutrition center for Nicholls athletics.

== Gallery ==
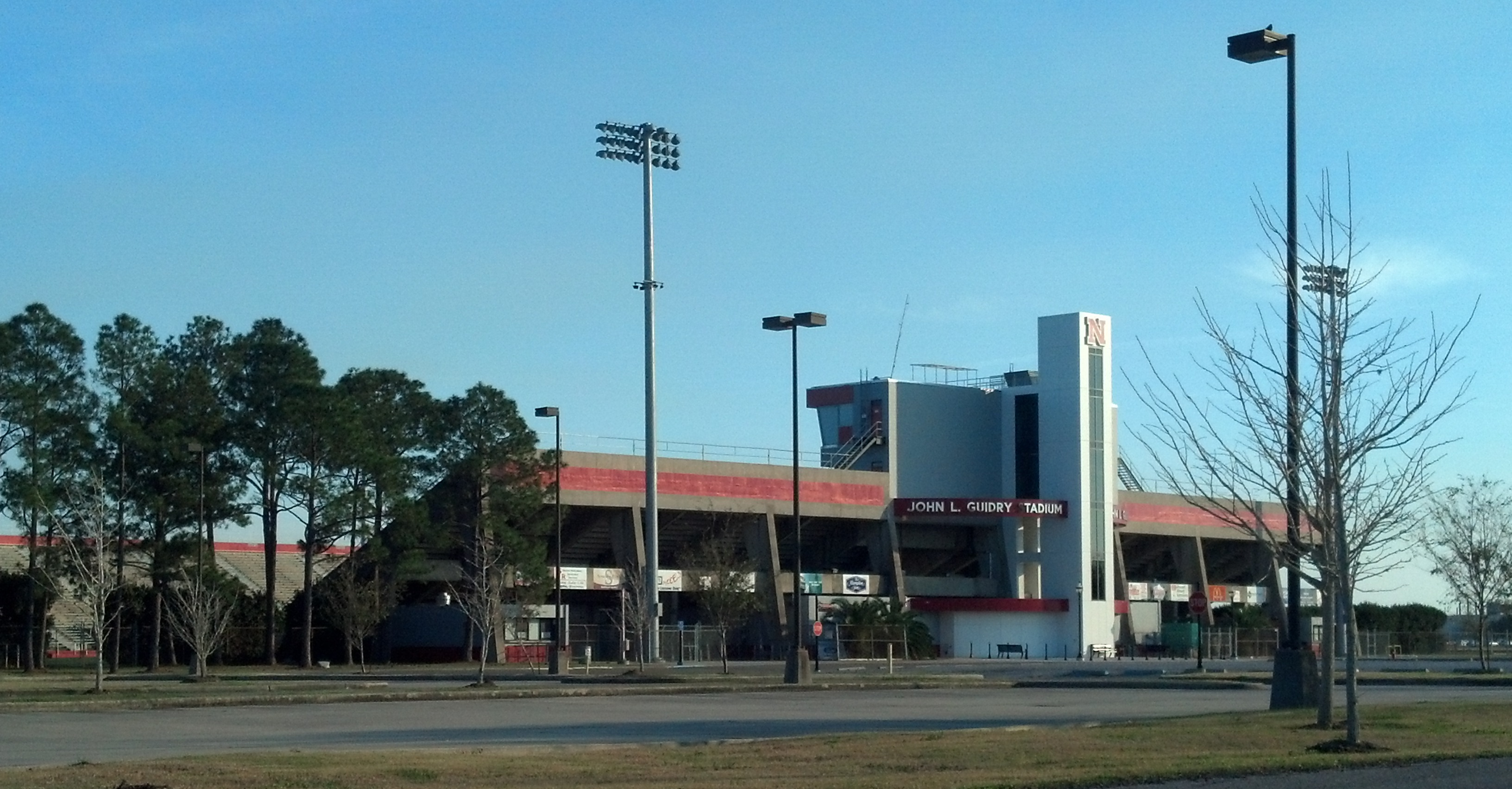
Manning Field at John L. Guidry Stadium

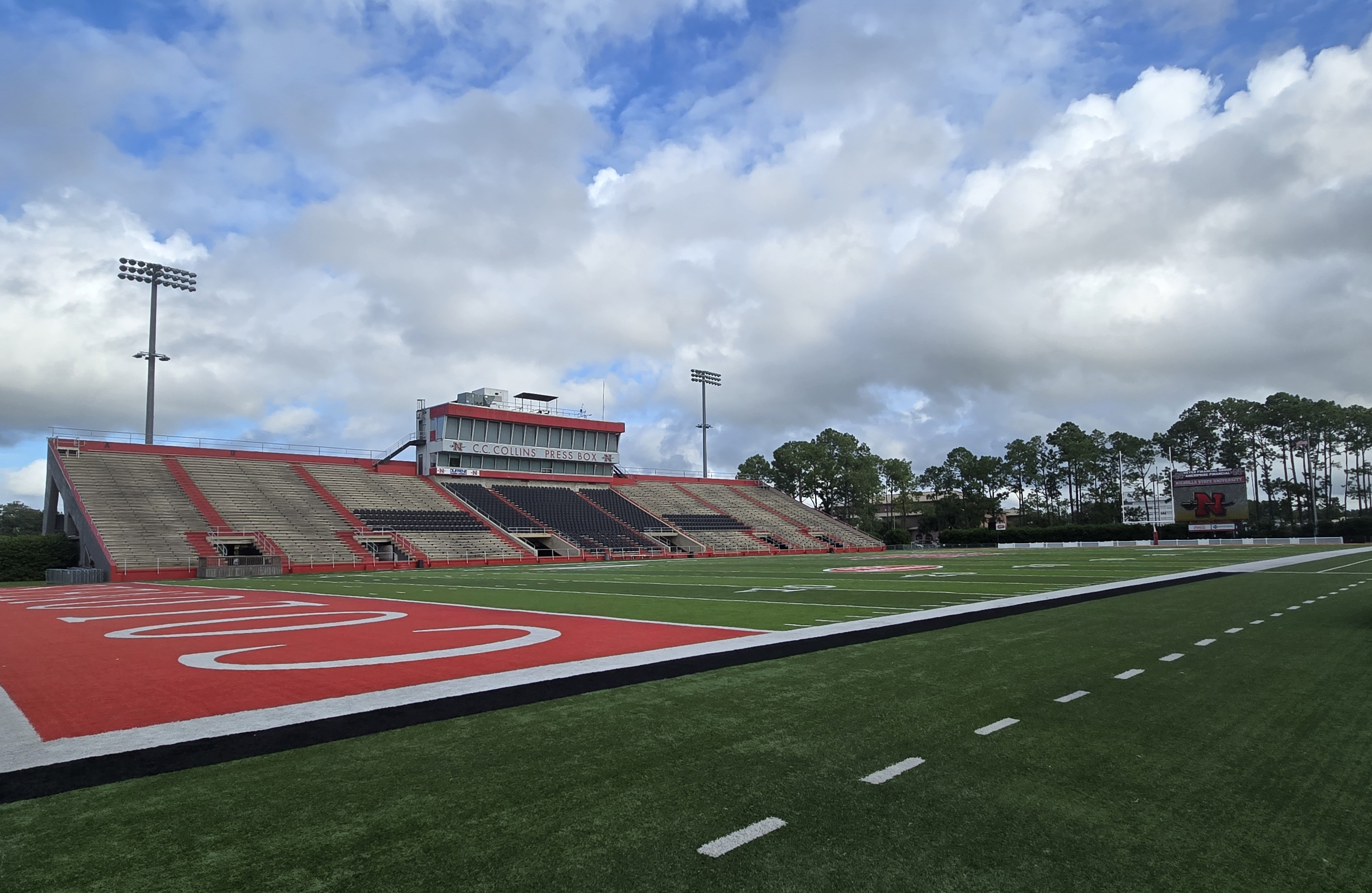
Manning Field at John L. Guidry Stadium and Video Board

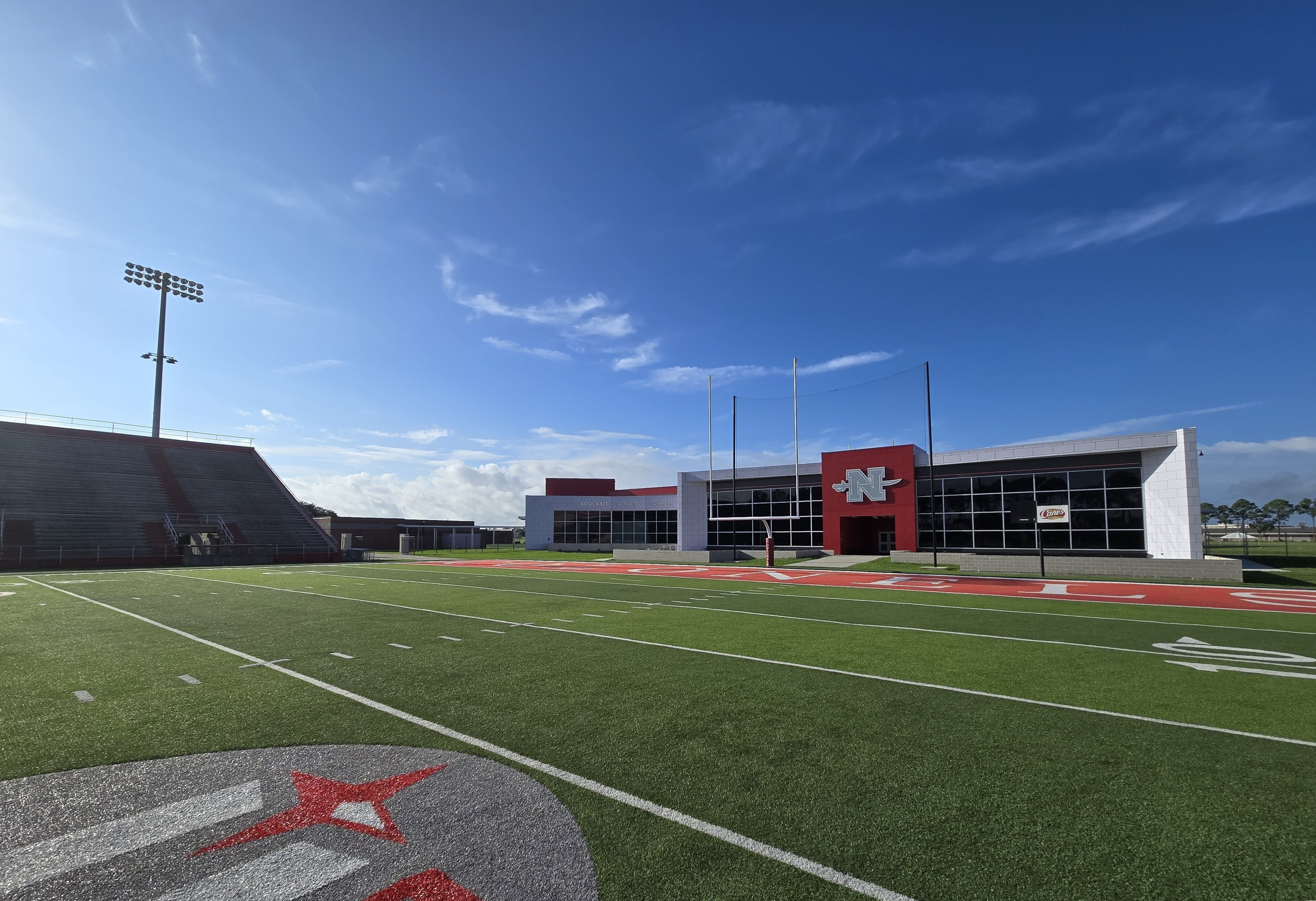
Manning Field at John L. Guidry Stadium and Boucvault Athletic Complex, field view

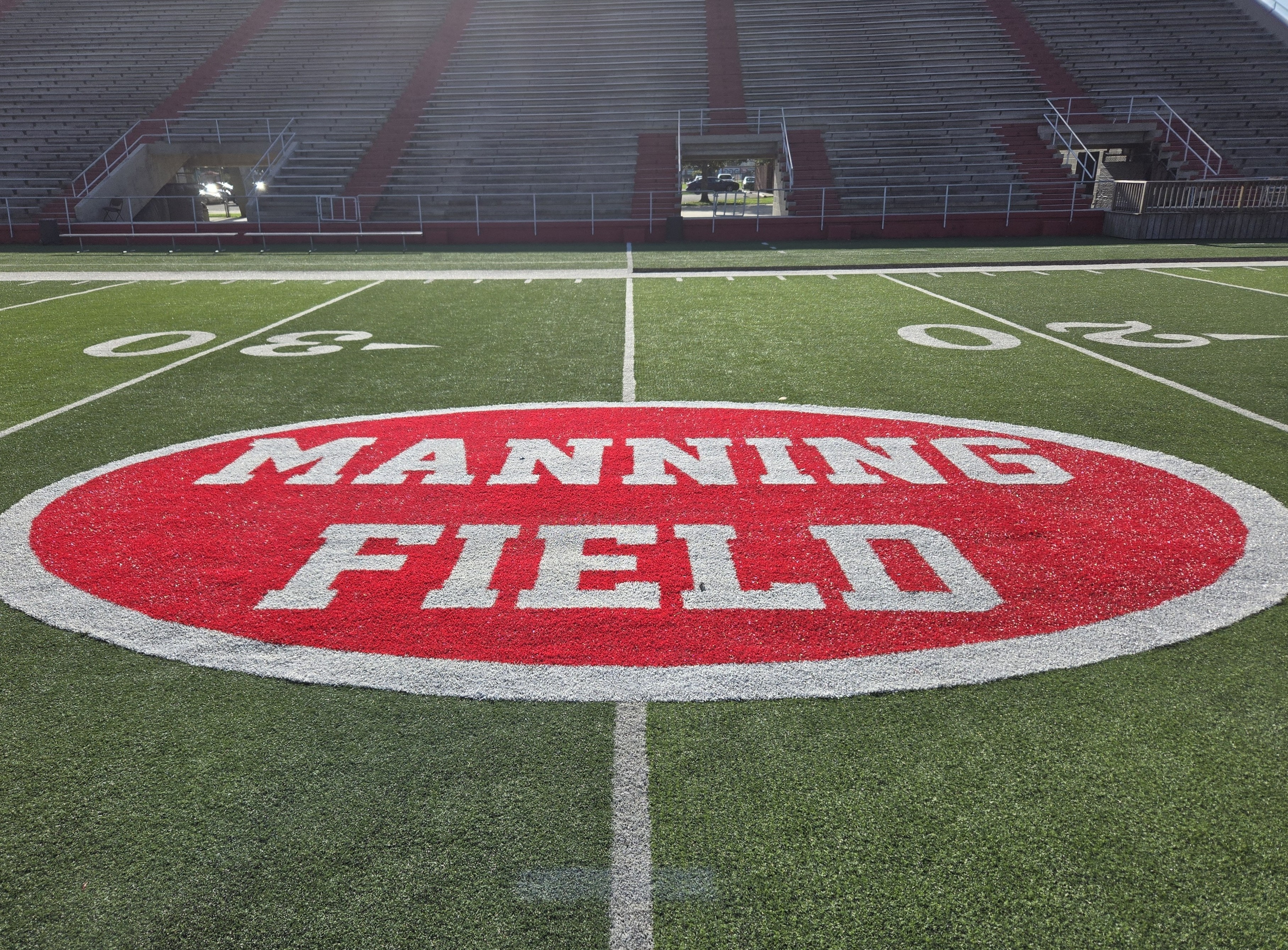
Manning Field Logo

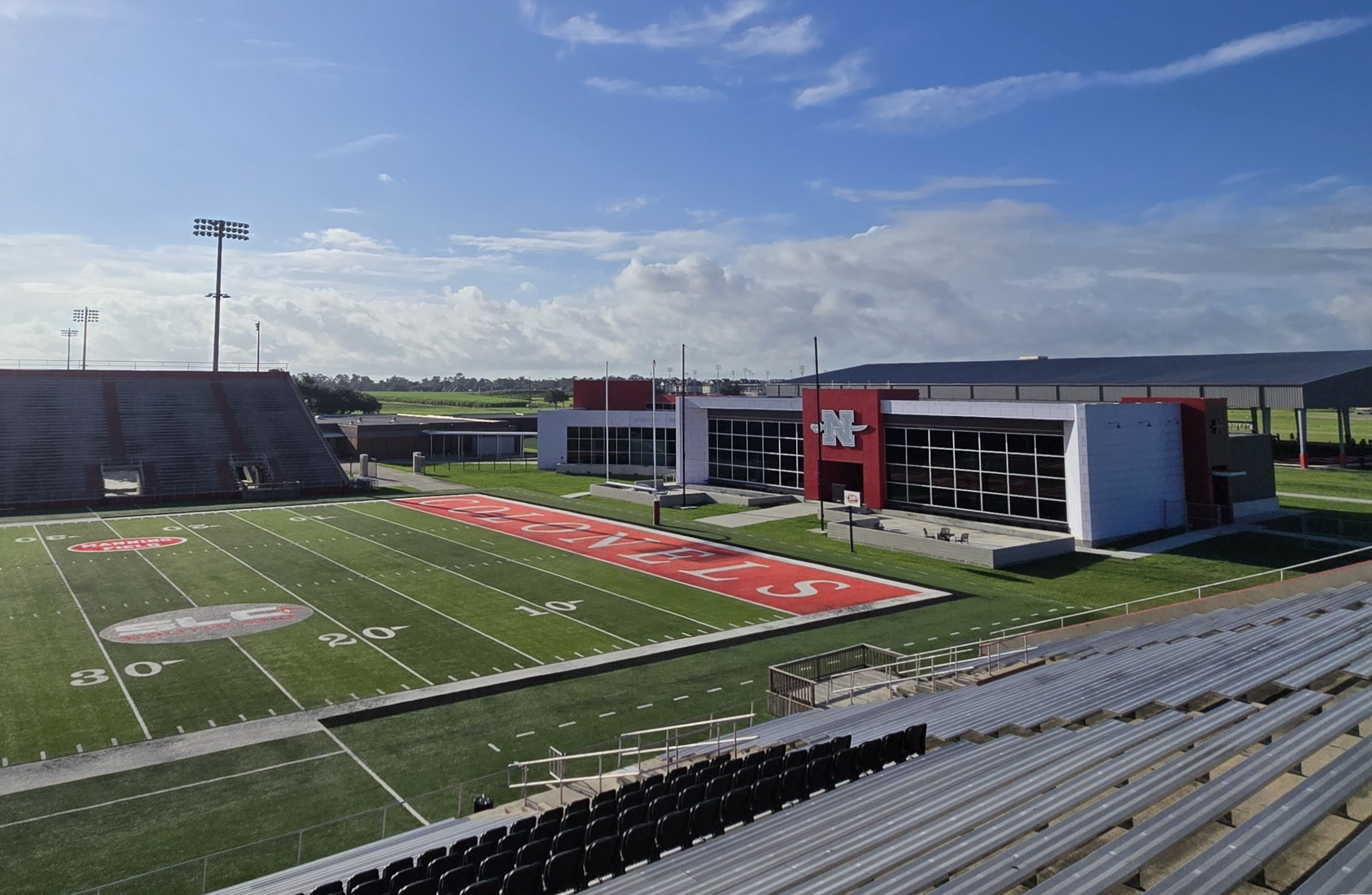
Manning Field at John L. Guidry Stadium and Boucvault Athletic Complex, Gaubert Oil Practice Facility at Shaw Sports Turf/Manning Field (background)

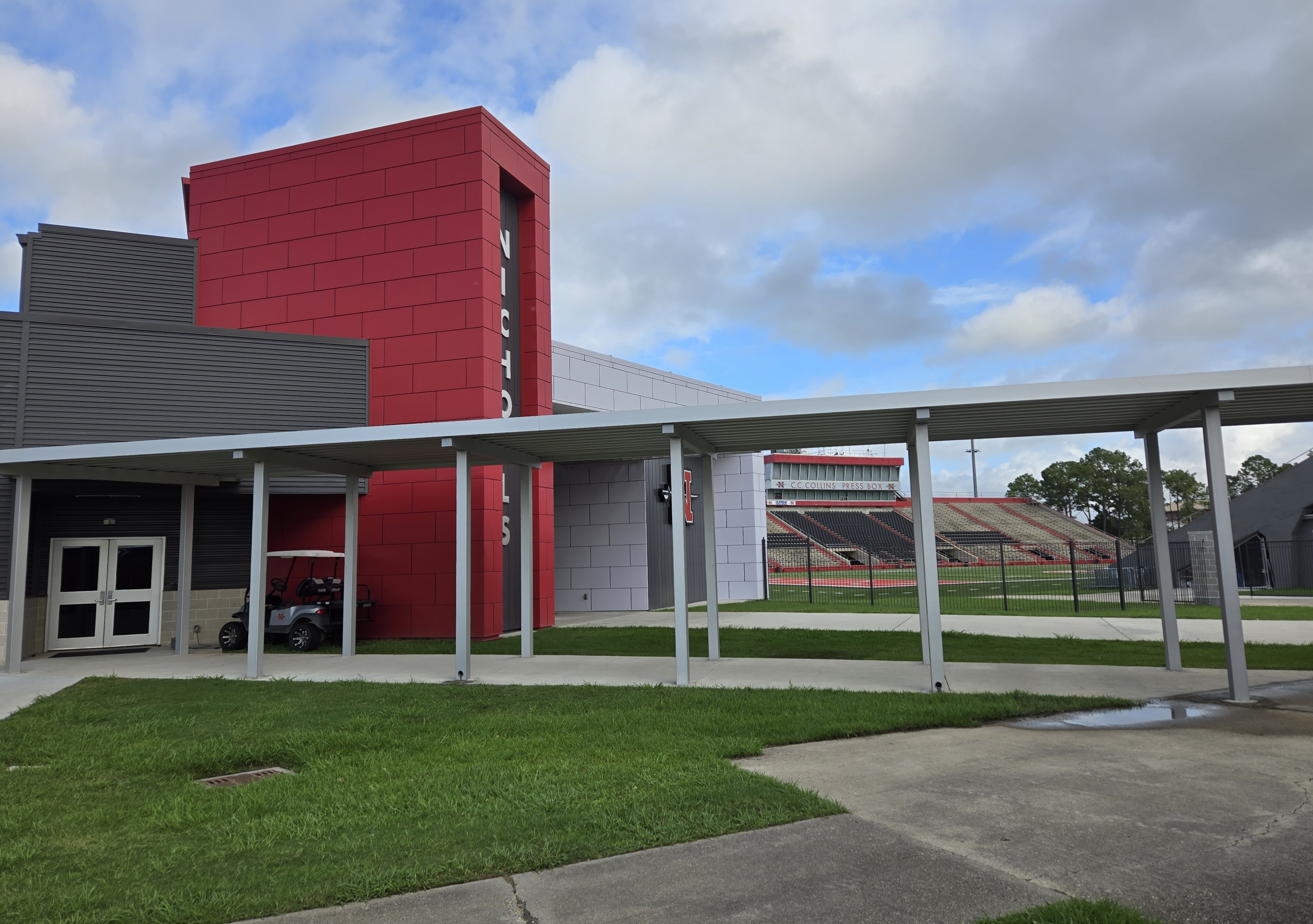
Boucvault Athletic Complex and Manning Field at John L. Guidry Stadium

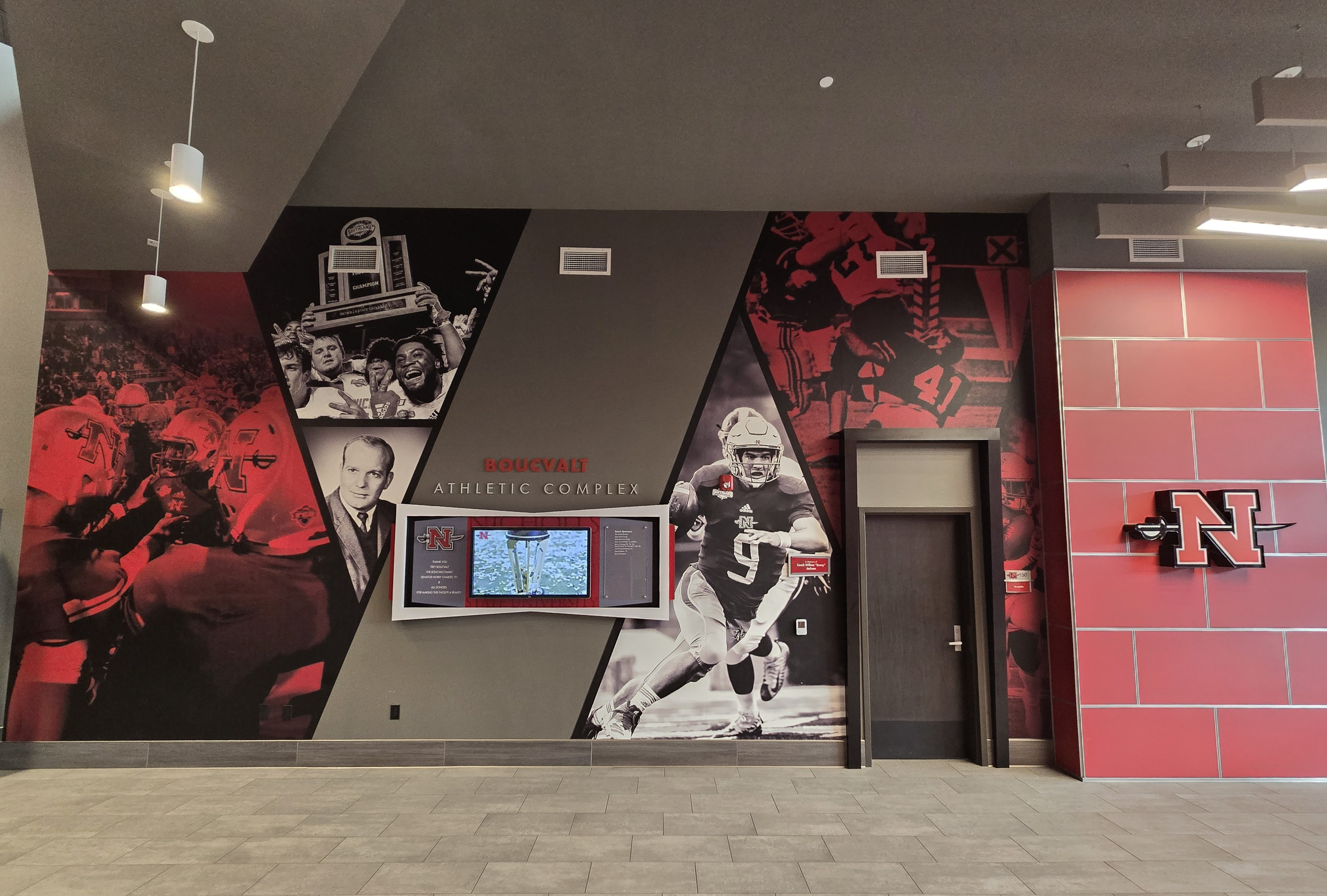
Boucvault Athletic Complex, main lobby

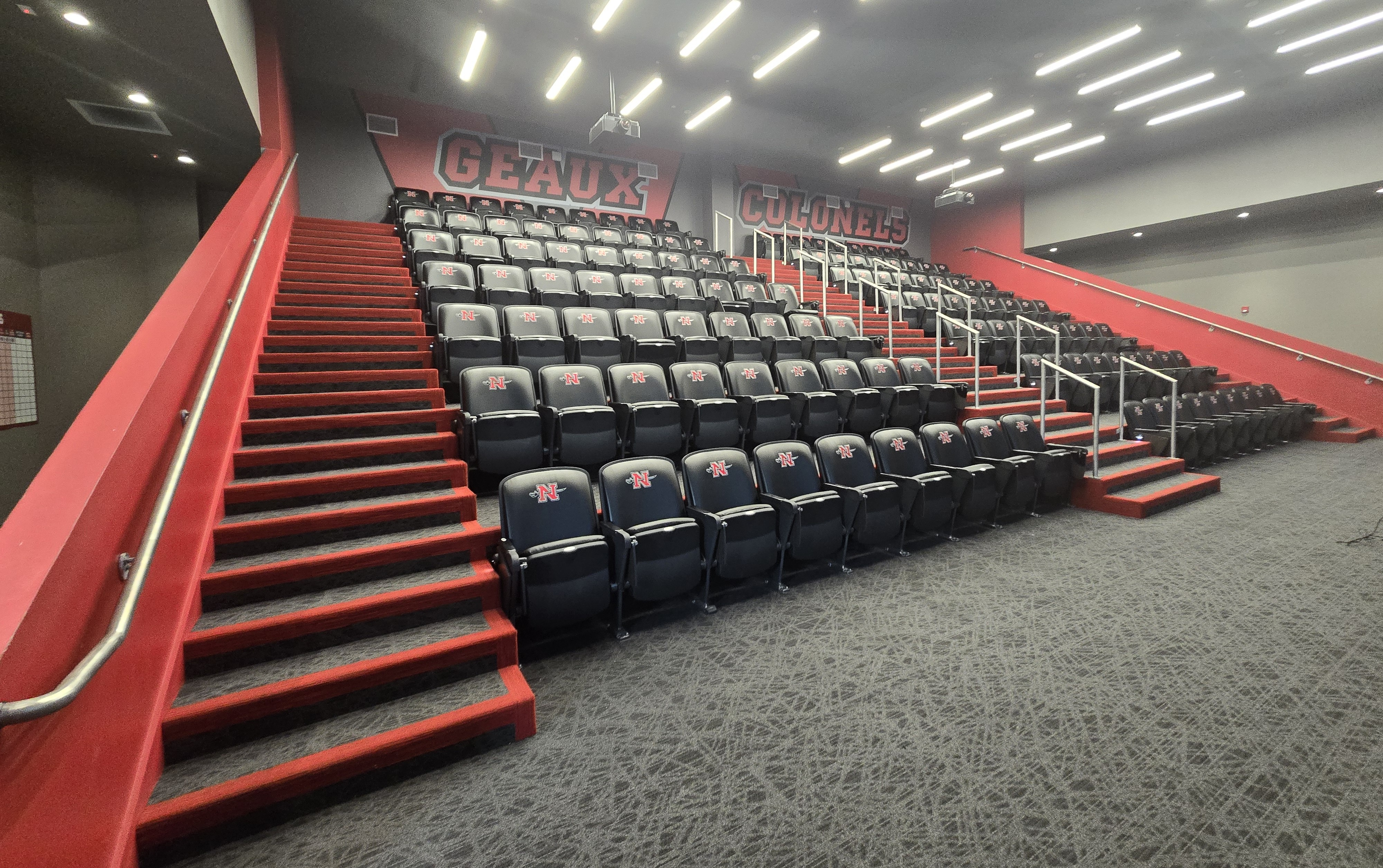
Nicholls Football Team Meeting Room in the Boucvault Athletic Complex

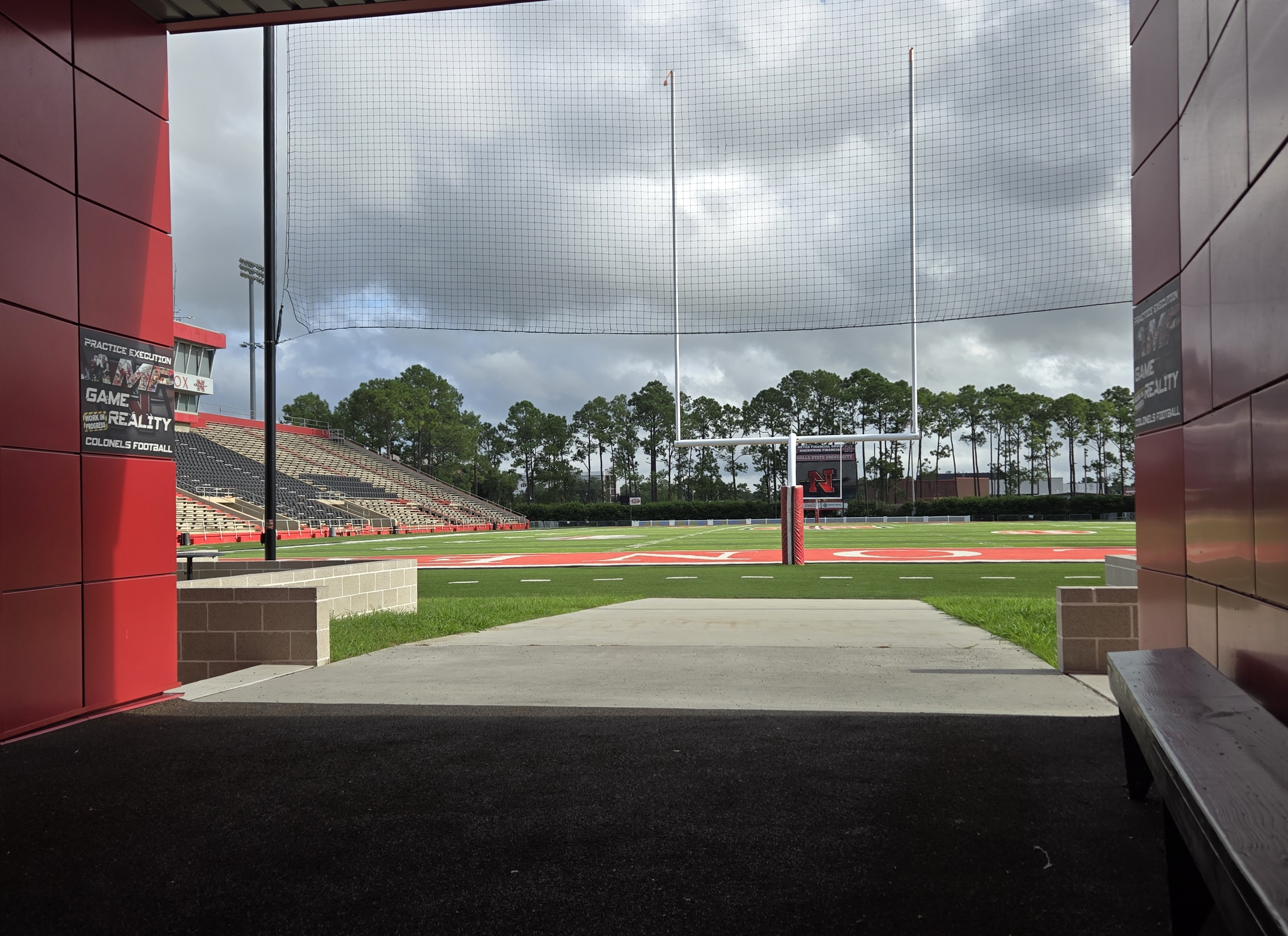
Players Tunnel from Boucvault Athletic Complex to Manning Field at John L. Guidry Stadium

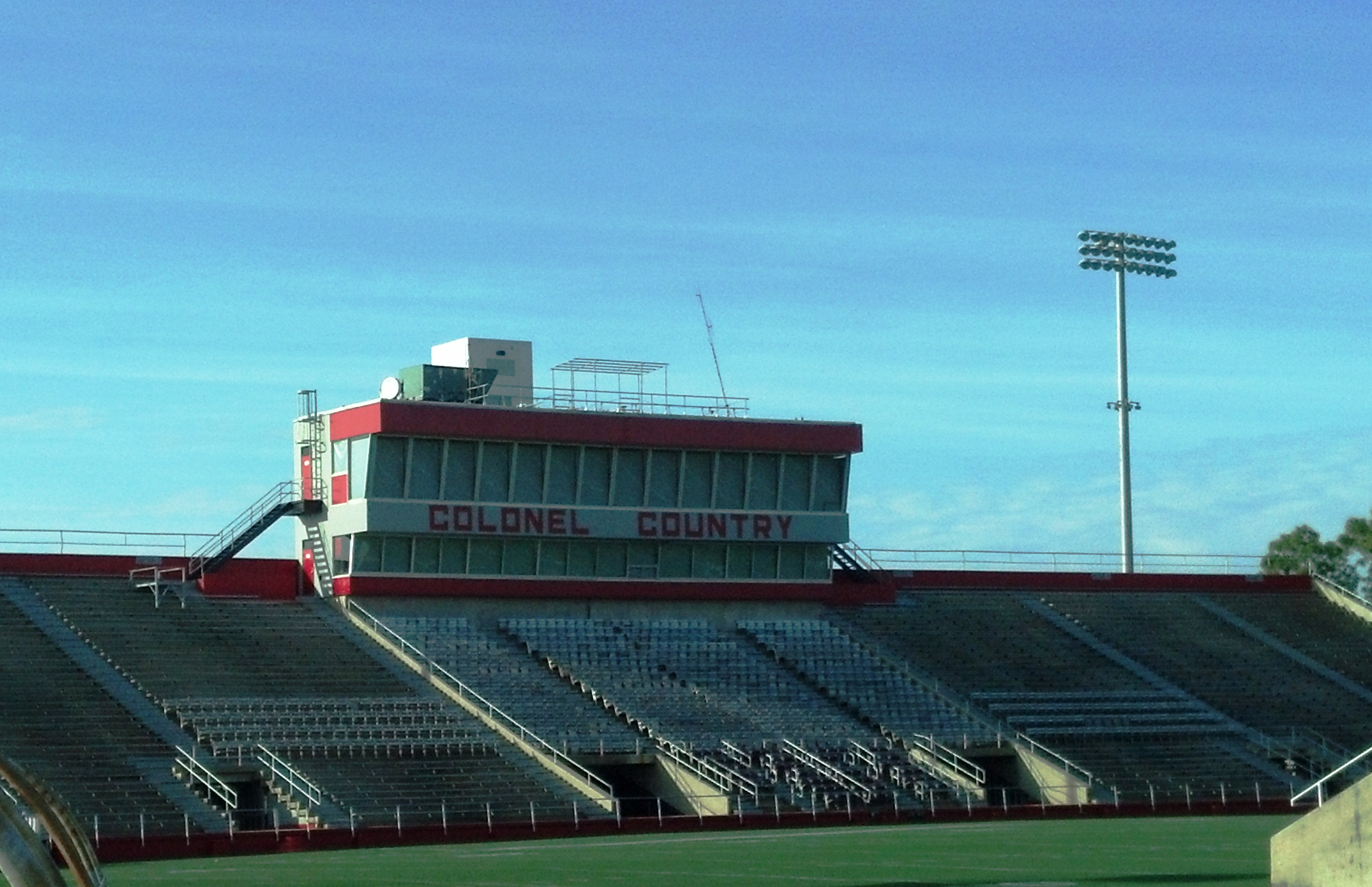
Manning Field at John L. Guidry Stadium (1980s–2016)

== See also ==
- Nicholls Colonels football
- Nicholls Colonels
- List of NCAA Division I FCS football stadiums
