= 1991 Southern Jaguars football team =

American college football season

1991 Southern Jaguars football
- Conference: Southwestern Athletic Conference
- Record: 4–7 (4–3 SWAC)
- Head coach: Gerald Kimble (3rd season)
- Defensive coordinator: Sherman Simmons (3rd season)
- Home stadium: A. W. Mumford Stadium

1991 Southwestern Athletic Conference football standings
	Conf.					Overall
Team	W		L		T	W		L		T
No. 5 Alabama State $	6	–	0	–	1	11	–	0	–	1
Alcorn State	4	–	2	–	1	7	–	2	–	1
Southern	4	–	3	–	0	4	–	7	–	0
Texas Southern	3	–	3	–	1	5	–	5	–	1
Mississippi Valley State	3	–	3	–	1	7	–	3	–	1
Jackson State	3	–	4	–	0	5	–	5	–	0
Grambling State	3	–	4	–	0	5	–	6	–	0
Prairie View A&M	0	–	7	–	0	0	–	11	–	0
$ – Conference champion; Rankings from NCAA Division I-AA Football Committee poll

The 1991 Southern Jaguars football team represented Southern University as a member of the Southwestern Athletic Conference (SWAC) during the 1991 NCAA Division I-AA football season. Led by third-year head coach Gerald Kimble, the Jaguars compiled an overall record of 4–7, with a conference record of 4–3, and finished third in the SWAC.

== Schedule ==
Date	Opponent	Site	Result	Attendance	Source
September 14	vs. No. 18 Alabama State	Ladd Stadium; Mobile, AL (Gulf Coast Classic)	L 16–19	32,000	
September 21	Texas Southern	A. W. Mumford Stadium; Baton Rouge, LA	W 38–30		
September 28	vs. South Carolina State*	Bobby Dodd Stadium; Atlanta, GA (Atlanta Football Classic)	L 23–30	26,560	
October 5	at Mississippi Valley State	Magnolia Stadium; Itta Bena, MS	L 0–7		
October 19	at Jackson State	Mississippi Veterans Memorial Stadium; Jackson, MS (rivalry)	W 21–20		
October 26	Alcorn State	A. W. Mumford Stadium; Baton Rouge, LA	L 29–52		
November 2	Nicholls State*	A. W. Mumford Stadium; Baton Rouge, LA	L 7–21		
November 9	vs. Florida A&M*	Joe Robbie Stadium; Miami Gardens, FL (Orange Blossom Classic)	L 20–24	20,503	
November 16	Tennessee State*	A. W. Mumford Stadium; Baton Rouge, LA	L 14–33	5,225	
November 23	Prairie View A&M	A. W. Mumford Stadium; Baton Rouge, LA	W 56–20		
November 30	vs. Grambling State	Louisiana Superdome; New Orleans, LA (Bayou Classic)	W 31–30	62,891	
*Non-conference game; Rankings from NCAA Division I-AA Football Committee Poll released prior to the game
