= 1993 Southern Jaguars football team =

American college football season

1993 Southern Jaguars football

Black college national champion SWAC champion

Heritage Bowl, W 11–0 vs. South Carolina State
- Conference: Southwestern Athletic Conference

Ranking
- Sports Network: No. 15
- Record: 11–1 (7–0 SWAC)
- Head coach: Pete Richardson (1st season)
- Defensive coordinator: Sherman Simmons (5th season)
- Home stadium: A. W. Mumford Stadium

1993 Southwestern Athletic Conference football standings
	Conf.					Overall
Team	W		L		T	W		L		T
No. 15 Southern $	7	–	0	–	0	11	–	1	–	0
No. 23 Alcorn State	6	–	1	–	0	8	–	3	–	0
Grambling State	4	–	3	–	0	7	–	4	–	0
Jackson State	3	–	3	–	1	5	–	5	–	1
Alabama State	3	–	3	–	1	5	–	4	–	1
Mississippi Valley State	2	–	3	–	2	4	–	4	–	2
Texas Southern	1	–	6	–	0	2	–	9	–	0
Prairie View A&M	0	–	7	–	0	0	–	11	–	0
$ – Conference champion; Rankings from The Sports Network Poll

The 1993 Southern Jaguars football team represented Southern University as a member of the Southwestern Athletic Conference (SWAC) during the 1993 NCAA Division I-AA football season. Led by first-year head coach Pete Richardson, the Jaguars compiled an overall record of 11–1, with a conference record of 7–0, and finished as SWAC champion. At the conclusion of the season, the Jaguars were also recognized as black college national champion.

== Schedule ==
Date	Opponent	Rank	Site	Result	Attendance	Source
September 4	vs. Northwestern State*		Louisiana Superdome; New Orleans, LA	W 30–13	13,583	
September 11	vs. Alabama State		Ladd Stadium; Mobile, AL (Gulf Coast Classic)	W 23–14		
September 18	Prairie View A&M		A. W. Mumford Stadium; Baton Rouge, LA	W 46–6		
September 25	vs. South Carolina State*	No. 25	Georgia Dome; Atlanta, GA (Atlanta Football Classic)	W 14–10	58,199	
October 2	at Mississippi Valley State	No. 21	Magnolia Stadium; Itta Bena, MS	W 14–13		
October 9	at Texas Southern	No. 19	Houston Astrodome; Houston, TX	W 48–7		
October 16	at Jackson State	No. 16	Mississippi Veterans Memorial Stadium; Jackson, MS (rivalry)	W 16–3	50,000	
October 23	Alcorn State	No. 16	A. W. Mumford Stadium; Baton Rouge, LA	W 47–31	28,000	
October 30	Nicholls State*	No. 12	A. W. Mumford Stadium; Baton Rouge, LA	L 14–28	25,592	
November 6	at Florida A&M*	No. 17	Bragg Memorial Stadium; Tallahassee, FL	W 26–4	30,797	
November 27	vs. Grambling State	No. 15	Louisiana Superdome; New Orleans, LA (Bayou Classic)	W 31–13	72,586	
January 1, 1994	vs. South Carolina State*	No. 15	Georgia Dome; Atlanta, GA (Heritage Bowl)	W 11–0	36,128	
*Non-conference game; Rankings from NCAA Division I-AA Football Committee Poll released prior to the game
