= Larry Dorsey =

American football player and coach (born 1953)

Biographical details
- Born: August 15, 1953 (age 73); Corinth, Mississippi, U.S.

Playing career
- 1972–1975: Tennessee State
- 1976–1977: San Diego Chargers
- 1978: Kansas City Chiefs

Coaching career (HC unless noted)
- 1990–1998: Mississippi Valley State
- 2000–2002: Prairie View A&M
- 2008–2010: Greenville-Weston HS (MS)

Head coaching record
- Overall: 42–81–3 (college)

Larry Darnnell Dorsey (born August 15, 1953) is an American former football player and coach. He played professionally as a wide receiver in the National Football League (NFL).

Dorsey played college football for the Tennessee State Tigers before playing in the NFL with the San Diego Chargers and Kansas City Chiefs. Dorsey served as the head football coach at Mississippi Valley State University from 1990 to 1998 and at Prairie View A&M University from 2000 to 2002, compiling a career college football coaching record of 42–81–3.

== Playing career ==
=== College ===
Dorsey played for the Tennessee State Tigers as a wide receiver under head coach John Merritt.

=== Professional ===
Dorsey was picked in the third round (64th overall) by the San Diego Chargers in the 1976 NFL draft. He played for the Charges for two years, then went to the Kansas City Chiefs for his third and final year in the NFL.

== Coaching career ==
=== Mississippi Valley State ===
Dorsey was the head football coach at Mississippi Valley State University in Itta Bena, Mississippi from 1990 to the end of the 1998 season. While at Mississippi Valley State, he accumulated a record of 37–54–3.

=== Prairie View A&M ===
Dorsey's next move was to be named the 21st football head coach at Prairie View A&M University in Prairie View, Texas and he held that position for three seasons, from 2000 until 2002. His record at Prairie View was 5–27. He resigned after his fifth season.

=== Greenville Weston High School ===
In June 2008, Coach Dorsey was selected by the Greenville Public School District in Greenville, Mississippi to become the next head football coach of the Greenville Weston High School Hornets. This is Dorsey's first ever head coaching job on the high school level.

In March 2010, after just two seasons, the Greenville Public School District School Board relieved Coach Dorsey of his coaching duties. Dorsey leftGreenville Weston with a 5–14 record.

== Head coaching record ==
=== College ===
Year	Team	Overall	Conference	Standing	Bowl/playoffs
Mississippi Valley State Delta Devils (Southwestern Athletic Conference) (1990–1998)
1990	Mississippi Valley State	5–6	3–3	T–3rd	
1991	Mississippi Valley State	7–3–1	3–3–1	T–4th	
1992	Mississippi Valley State	4–5	2–5	7th	
1993	Mississippi Valley State	4–4–2	2–3–2	6th	
1994	Mississippi Valley State	3–7	2–5	T–6th	
1995	Mississippi Valley State	2–9	2–5	6th	
1996	Mississippi Valley State	7–4	5–2	T–2nd	
1997	Mississippi Valley State	4–6	3–5	6th	
1998	Mississippi Valley State	1–10	1–7	8th	
Mississippi Valley State:		37–54–3	23–38–3		
Prairie View A&M Panthers (Southwestern Athletic Conference) (2000–2002)
2000	Prairie View A&M	1–10	1–6	5th (West)	
2001	Prairie View A&M	3–7	2–5	T–3rd (West)	
2002	Prairie View A&M	1–10	0–7	5th (West)	
Prairie View A&M:		5–27	3–18		
Total:		42–81–3			
