= 1991 Jackson State Tigers football team =

American college football season

1991 Jackson State Tigers football
- Conference: Southwestern Athletic Conference
- Record: 5–5 (3–4 SWAC)
- Head coach: W. C. Gorden (16th season)
- Home stadium: Mississippi Veterans Memorial Stadium

1991 Southwestern Athletic Conference football standings
	Conf.					Overall
Team	W		L		T	W		L		T
No. 5 Alabama State $	6	–	0	–	1	11	–	0	–	1
Alcorn State	4	–	2	–	1	7	–	2	–	1
Southern	4	–	3	–	0	4	–	7	–	0
Texas Southern	3	–	3	–	1	5	–	5	–	1
Mississippi Valley State	3	–	3	–	1	7	–	3	–	1
Jackson State	3	–	4	–	0	5	–	5	–	0
Grambling State	3	–	4	–	0	5	–	6	–	0
Prairie View A&M	0	–	7	–	0	0	–	11	–	0
$ – Conference champion; Rankings from NCAA Division I-AA Football Committee poll

The 1991 Jackson State Tigers football team represented Jackson State University as a member of the Southwestern Athletic Conference (SWAC) during the 1991 NCAA Division I-AA football season. Led by 16th-year head coach W. C. Gorden, the Tigers compiled an overall record of 5–5 and a mark of 3–4 in conference play, and finished tied for sixth in the SWAC.

== Schedule ==
Date	Opponent	Site	Result	Attendance	Source
August 31	vs. Alabama State	Atlanta–Fulton County Stadium; Atlanta, GA (Bill Lucas Memorial Labor Day Classic)	L 27–28	32,857	
September 14	vs. Tennessee State*	Legion Field; Birmingham, AL (John A. Merritt Football Classic/rivalry)	W 41–19	17,581	
September 21	Stephen F. Austin*	Mississippi Veterans Memorial Stadium; Jackson, MS	W 31–16	10,224	
September 29	Mississippi Valley State	Mississippi Veterans Memorial Stadium; Jackson, MS	L 14–23	51,233	
October 5	vs. Delaware State*	RFK Stadium; Washington, DC (Capitol Classic)	L 34–37	5,231	
October 19	Southern	Mississippi Veterans Memorial Stadium; Jackson, MS (rivalry)	L 20–21		
October 26	Grambling State	Mississippi Veterans Memorial Stadium; Jackson, MS	W 34–22	12,000	
November 9	at Texas Southern	Robertson Stadium; Houston, TX	W 13–12		
November 16	vs. South Carolina State*	Ladd Stadium; Mobile, AL (Hank Aaron Classic)	W 17–6	9,200	
November 23	Alcorn State	Mississippi Veterans Memorial Stadium; Jackson, MS (Soul Bowl)	L 16–18	35,500	
*Non-conference game

== After the season ==
=== NFL draft ===
The following Tigers were selected in the 1992 NFL draft after the season.

Round	Pick	Player	Position	NFL team
2	36	Jimmy Smith	Wide receiver	Dallas Cowboys
8	208	Dietrich Lockridge	Guard	Denver Broncos
