= Houston Markham =

American football player and coach (c.1944–2019)

Biographical details
- Born: c. 1944; Brookhaven, Mississippi, U.S.
- Died: July 17, 2019 (aged 75)

Playing career
- c. 1964: Alcorn State

Coaching career (HC unless noted)
- 1966: Vicksburg Temple HS (MS) (assistant)
- 1967–1970: Vicksburg Temple HS (MS)
- 1971–1972: Vicksburg North HS (MS)
- 1973–1974: Vicksburg HS (MS)
- 1975–1986: Jackson State (assistant)
- 1987–1997: Alabama State

Head coaching record
- Overall: 69–47–4 (college); 63–16–3 (high school)
- Bowls: 1–0

Accomplishments and honors

Championships
- 1 black college national (1991); 1 SWAC (1991)

Houston Markham Jr. (c. 1944 – July 17, 2019) was an American football player and coach. He served as the head football coach at Alabama State University from 1987 to 1997, compiling a record of 69–47–4. His 1991 squad was named the black college football national champion. Markham died on July 17, 2019, at the age of 75. He coached at Temple High School and Vicksburg High School.

== Head coaching record ==
=== College ===
Year	Team	Overall	Conference	Standing	Bowl/playoffs	NCAA^{#}
Alabama State Hornets (Southwestern Athletic Conference) (1987–1997)
1987	Alabama State	8–3	4–3	4th		
1988	Alabama State	7–3	4–3	T–3rd		
1989	Alabama State	5–5–1	2–4–1	6th		
1990	Alabama State	8–2–1	4–2	2nd		
1991	Alabama State	11–0–1	6–0–1	1st	W Heritage	5
1992	Alabama State	5–6	3–4	T–4th		
1993	Alabama State	5–4–1	3–3–1	T–4th		
1994	Alabama State	6–5	3–4	5th		
1995	Alabama State	8–3	5–2	3rd		
1996	Alabama State	3–8	2–5	T–6th		
1997	Alabama State	3–8	2–6	T–7th		
Alabama State:		69–47–4	4–8			
Total:		69–47–4				
National championship Conference title Conference division title or championship game berth
