= 1993 Grambling State Tigers football team =

American college football season

1993 Grambling State Tigers football
- Conference: Southwestern Athletic Conference
- Record: 7–4 (4–3 SWAC)
- Head coach: Eddie Robinson (51st season)
- Home stadium: Eddie G. Robinson Memorial Stadium

1993 Southwestern Athletic Conference football standings
	Conf.					Overall
Team	W		L		T	W		L		T
No. 15 Southern $	7	–	0	–	0	11	–	1	–	0
No. 23 Alcorn State	6	–	1	–	0	8	–	3	–	0
Grambling State	4	–	3	–	0	7	–	4	–	0
Jackson State	3	–	3	–	1	5	–	5	–	1
Alabama State	3	–	3	–	1	5	–	4	–	1
Mississippi Valley State	2	–	3	–	2	4	–	4	–	2
Texas Southern	1	–	6	–	0	2	–	9	–	0
Prairie View A&M	0	–	7	–	0	0	–	11	–	0
$ – Conference champion; Rankings from The Sports Network Poll

The 1993 Grambling State Tigers football team represented Grambling State University as a member of the Southwestern Athletic Conference (SWAC) during the 1993 NCAA Division I-AA football season. Led by 51st-year head coach Eddie Robinson, the Tigers compiled an overall record of 7–4 and a mark of 4–3 in conference play, and finished third in the SWAC.

== Schedule ==
Date	Opponent	Site	Result	Attendance	Source
September 4	at Alcorn State	Casem-Spinks Stadium; Lorman, MS	L 24–25	18,000	
September 18	vs. Tennessee State*	Liberty Bowl Memorial Stadium; Memphis, TN (Southern Heritage Classic)	W 33–28	41,669	
September 25	vs. Hampton*	Giants Stadium; East Rutherford, NJ (Whitney Young Memorial Classic)	L 26–27	58,222	
October 2	vs. Prairie View A&M	Cotton Bowl; Dallas, TX (rivalry)	W 49–0	61,500	
October 9	Mississippi Valley State	Eddie G. Robinson Memorial Stadium; Grambling, LA	W 28–19	9,764	
October 16	vs. Arkansas–Pine Bluff*	Independence Stadium; Shreveport, LA (Red River Classic)	W 45–7	32,500	
October 23	at Jackson State	Mississippi Veterans Memorial Stadium; Jackson, MS	W 20–14	36,500	
October 30	Texas Southern	Eddie G. Robinson Memorial Stadium; Grambling, LA	W 50–26	14,962	
November 6	at Alabama State	Cramton Bowl; Montgomery, AL	L 10–16		
November 13	Florida A&M*	Eddie G. Robinson Memorial Stadium; Grambling, LA	W 39–13		
November 27	vs. No. 15 Southern	Louisiana Superdome; New Orleans, LA (Bayou Classic)	L 13–31	72,586	
*Non-conference game; Rankings from The Sports Network Poll released prior to the game
