= 1991 Grambling State Tigers football team =

American college football season

1991 Grambling State Tigers football
- Conference: Southwestern Athletic Conference
- Record: 5–6 (3–4 SWAC)
- Head coach: Eddie Robinson (49th season)
- Home stadium: Eddie G. Robinson Memorial Stadium

1991 Southwestern Athletic Conference football standings
	Conf.					Overall
Team	W		L		T	W		L		T
No. 5 Alabama State $	6	–	0	–	1	11	–	0	–	1
Alcorn State	4	–	2	–	1	7	–	2	–	1
Southern	4	–	3	–	0	4	–	7	–	0
Texas Southern	3	–	3	–	1	5	–	5	–	1
Mississippi Valley State	3	–	3	–	1	7	–	3	–	1
Jackson State	3	–	4	–	0	5	–	5	–	0
Grambling State	3	–	4	–	0	5	–	6	–	0
Prairie View A&M	0	–	7	–	0	0	–	11	–	0
$ – Conference champion; Rankings from NCAA Division I-AA Football Committee poll

The 1991 Grambling State Tigers football team represented Grambling State University as a member of the Southwestern Athletic Conference (SWAC) during the 1991 NCAA Division I-AA football season. Led by 49th-year head coach Eddie Robinson, the Tigers compiled an overall record of 5–6 and a mark of 3–4 in conference play, and finished tied for sixth in the SWAC.

== Schedule ==
Date	Opponent	Site	Result	Attendance	Source
September 7	vs. Alcorn State	Independence Stadium; Shreveport, LA (Red River Classic)	L 22–27		
September 14	vs. Virginia Union*	Giants Stadium; East Rutherford, NJ (Whitney Young Memorial Classic)	L 37–46	30,570	
September 21	at Tennessee State*	Hale Stadium; Nashville, TN	W 24–21	9,761	
September 28	vs. North Carolina A&T*	Cotton Bowl; Dallas, TX (State Fair Classic)	L 12–28	42,670	
October 5	Prairie View A&M	Eddie G. Robinson Memorial Stadium; Grambling, LA (rivalry)	W 77–7	10,350	
October 19	Mississippi Valley State	Eddie G. Robinson Memorial Stadium; Grambling, LA	W 37–35		
October 26	at Jackson State	Mississippi Veterans Memorial Stadium; Jackson, MS	L 22–34	12,000	
November 2	Texas Southern	Eddie G. Robinson Memorial Stadium; Grambling, LA	W 30–27		
November 9	vs. Alabama State	Pontiac Silverdome; Pontiac, MI (Motor City Classic)	L 14–60	44,692	
November 16	Florida A&M*	Eddie G. Robinson Memorial Stadium; Grambling, LA	W 25–22	7,001	
November 30	vs. Southern	Louisiana Superdome; New Orleans, LA (Bayou Classic)	L 30–31	62,891	
*Non-conference game

== After the season ==
=== NFL draft ===
The following Tiger was selected in the 1992 NFL draft after the season.

Round	Pick	Player	Position	NFL team
11	292	Nate Singleton	Wide receiver	New York Giants
