= 1993 Jackson State Tigers football team =

American college football season

1993 Jackson State Tigers football
- Conference: Southwestern Athletic Conference
- Record: 5–5–1 (3–3–1 SWAC)
- Head coach: James Carson (2nd season)
- Offensive coordinator: John McKenzie (2nd season)
- Home stadium: Mississippi Veterans Memorial Stadium

1993 Southwestern Athletic Conference football standings
	Conf.					Overall
Team	W		L		T	W		L		T
No. 15 Southern $	7	–	0	–	0	11	–	1	–	0
No. 23 Alcorn State	6	–	1	–	0	8	–	3	–	0
Grambling State	4	–	3	–	0	7	–	4	–	0
Jackson State	3	–	3	–	1	5	–	5	–	1
Alabama State	3	–	3	–	1	5	–	4	–	1
Mississippi Valley State	2	–	3	–	2	4	–	4	–	2
Texas Southern	1	–	6	–	0	2	–	9	–	0
Prairie View A&M	0	–	7	–	0	0	–	11	–	0
$ – Conference champion; Rankings from The Sports Network Poll

The 1993 Jackson State Tigers football team represented Jackson State University as a member of the Southwestern Athletic Conference (SWAC) during the 1993 NCAA Division I-AA football season. Led by second-year head coach James Carson, the Tigers compiled an overall record of 5–5–1 and a mark of 3–3–1 in conference play, and finished tied for fourth in the SWAC.

== Schedule ==
Date	Opponent	Rank	Site	Result	Attendance	Source
September 4	Tuskegee*	No. 21	Mississippi Veterans Memorial Stadium; Jackson, MS	W 24–12	18,000	
September 11	vs. Tennessee State*	No. 20	Soldier Field; Chicago, IL (Windy City Classic)	W 24–18	43,800	
September 18	at No. 23 Florida A&M*	No. 16	Bragg Memorial Stadium; Tallahassee, FL	L 19–41	19,176	
September 25	Mississippi Valley State	No. 21	Mississippi Veterans Memorial Stadium; Jackson, MS	T 7–7	37,000	
October 2	vs. South Carolina State*		Hoosier Dome; Indianapolis, IN (Circle City Classic)	L 33–34	61,915	
October 9	Alabama State		Mississippi Veterans Memorial Stadium; Jackson, MS	W 17–15		
October 16	No. 16 Southern		Mississippi Veterans Memorial Stadium; Jackson, MS (rivalry)	L 3–16	50,000	
October 23	Grambling State		Mississippi Veterans Memorial Stadium; Jackson, MS	L 14–20	36,500	
November 6	Texas Southern		Mississippi Veterans Memorial Stadium; Jackson, MS	W 38–12		
November 13	at Prairie View A&M		Edward L. Blackshear Field; Prairie View, TX	W 37–7	1,013	
November 20	Alcorn State		Mississippi Veterans Memorial Stadium; Jackson, MS (Soul Bowl)	L 22–31	46,500	
*Non-conference game; Rankings from NCAA Division I-AA Football Committee Poll released prior to the game
