= Ronald Beard =

American football coach (born 1951)

Biographical details
- Born: August 30, 1951 (age 75)

Coaching career (HC unless noted)
- 1973–1977: Central State (assistant)
- 1978–1983: North Carolina A&T (assistant)
- 1984–1990: Prairie View A&M (assistant)
- 1991–1994: Prairie View A&M

Head coaching record
- Overall: 0–44

Ronald Beard (born August 30, 1951) is an American former college football coach. He was the 17th head football coach for the Prairie View A&M University Panthers located in Prairie View, Texas. He held the position for four seasons, from 1991 until 1994. His career coaching record at Prairie View was 0–44, giving him the worst record for a full-time head coach in college football history.

== Career ==
Beard attended Eastern Michigan University and graduated in 1973. Following graduation, he took a job at Central State University and served as assistant coach and defensive coordinator of the school's football team until 1977. Leaving Central State, he moved to North Carolina Agricultural and Technical State University, working as assistant head coach and defensive coordinator until 1983. He moved to Prairie View in 1984 and began work as an assistant coach. He received a master's degree in physical education from Prairie View in 1986. In spring 1990, Prairie View suspended all athletic programs except track and field after it was discovered the athletic department was $3 million in debt, in part due to expense-report fraud by Beard's then-boss, Haney Catchings. Due to support from faculty, staff, and students at the school, however, the program was revived. Beard was named the head coach of the school's resurrected football team after Prairie View's first choice, Luther Booker, accepted the job, but resigned in February 1991 before playing a single game.

== Losing streak ==
Beard has the dubious distinction of being the only full-time head football coach at any major college to coach for four years without a single win. However, he worked under enormous handicaps. Prairie View was the only school in the Southwestern Athletic Conference (SWAC) not to award football scholarships, largely because a request for donations from alumni only got 150 responses out of 30,000 letters sent.

The Panthers' practice uniforms were hand-me-downs from the Houston Oilers. Their game uniforms were either only washed in water or never washed at all, depending on the source. Many of the players had come to Prairie View after failing physicals at other schools. Team morale was so low that at one point late in Beard's tenure, only six players on the 70-man squad usually showed up for practice. As well, Beard and his assistants had other, non-football duties; Beard taught 28 hours a week and also coached the golf team. In a post-mortem interview with Sports Illustrated, Beard claimed that the circumstances he faced made it impossible for him to field a competitive team. He claimed that the handicaps he faced were so severe that he was forced to field what amounted to an "intramural or club football" team at the Division I-AA level.

According to the College Football Data Warehouse, his 0–44 lifetime record is the worst in college football history. His teams were outscored 1,989 to 280 during his four years of coaching. The worst loss was 92–0 to Alabama State in 1991, while the closest game was a 12–8 home loss against Arkansas-Pine Bluff in 1993. His 1991 team only scored 48 points during the entire season.

His tenure comprised more than half of Prairie View's 80-game losing streak from 1989 to 1998, the longest in NCAA history. On November 12, 1994, Beard's Panthers lost to Jackson State, 52–7, for Prairie View's 45th consecutive loss, thus passing Columbia's 44-game losing streak of 1983–1988 as the longest in Division I-AA history.

Beard was fired as head coach in July 1995, just two months before the start of the 1995 season.

== Head coaching record ==
Year	Team	Overall	Conference	Standing	Bowl/playoffs
Prairie View A&M (Southwestern Athletic Conference) (1991–1994)
1991	Prairie View A&M	0–11	0–7	8th	
1992	Prairie View A&M	0–11	0–7	8th	
1993	Prairie View A&M	0–11	0–7	8th	
1994	Prairie View A&M	0–11	0–7	8th	
Prairie View A&M:		0–44	0–28		
Total:		0–44			
