= 1993 Alcorn State Braves football team =

American college football season

1993 Alcorn State Braves football
- Conference: Southwestern Athletic Conference

Ranking
- Sports Network: No. 23
- Record: 8–3 (6–1 SWAC)
- Head coach: Cardell Jones (3rd season)
- Home stadium: Jack Spinks Stadium

1993 Southwestern Athletic Conference football standings
	Conf.					Overall
Team	W		L		T	W		L		T
No. 15 Southern $	7	–	0	–	0	11	–	1	–	0
No. 23 Alcorn State	6	–	1	–	0	8	–	3	–	0
Grambling State	4	–	3	–	0	7	–	4	–	0
Jackson State	3	–	3	–	1	5	–	5	–	1
Alabama State	3	–	3	–	1	5	–	4	–	1
Mississippi Valley State	2	–	3	–	2	4	–	4	–	2
Texas Southern	1	–	6	–	0	2	–	9	–	0
Prairie View A&M	0	–	7	–	0	0	–	11	–	0
$ – Conference champion; Rankings from The Sports Network Poll

The 1993 Alcorn State Braves football team represented Alcorn State University as a member of the Southwestern Athletic Conference (SWAC) during the 1993 NCAA Division I-AA football season. Led by third-year head coach Cardell Jones, the Braves compiled an overall record of 8–3, with a conference record of 6–1, and finished second in the SWAC.

== Schedule ==
Date	Opponent	Rank	Site	Result	Attendance	Source
September 4	Grambling State	No. 20	Jack Spinks Stadium; Lorman, MS	W 25–24	18,000	
September 11	Texas Southern	No. 15	Mississippi Veterans Memorial Stadium; Jackson, MS	W 44–41		
September 18	at Alabama State	No. 11	Cramton Bowl; Montgomery, AL	W 28–25		
September 25	vs. Howard*	No. 9	Busch Memorial Stadium; St. Louis, MO (Gateway Classic)	L 36–38	17,798	
October 2	Sam Houston State*	No. 17	Jack Spinks Stadium; Lorman, MS	W 31–24		
October 16	Prairie View A&M	No. 15	Jack Spinks Stadium; Lorman, MS	W 31–10		
October 23	at No. 16 Southern	No. 14	A. W. Mumford Stadium; Baton Rouge, LA	L 31–47	28,000	
October 30	Jacksonville State*	No. 20	Casem-Spinks Stadium; Lorman, MS	W 41–36	5,000	
November 6	Mississippi Valley State	No. 18	Jack Spinks Stadium; Lorman, MS	W 28–20		
November 13	at No. 4 Troy State*	No. 15	Veterans Memorial Stadium; Troy, AL	L 21–63		
November 20	at Jackson State	No. 23	Mississippi Veterans Memorial Stadium; Jackson, MS (Soul Bowl)	W 31–22	46,500	
*Non-conference game; Rankings from NCAA Division I-AA Football Committee Poll released prior to the game
