= 1991 Delaware State Hornets football team =

American college football season

1991 Delaware State Hornets football

MEAC co-champion
- Conference: Mid-Eastern Athletic Conference
- Record: 9–2 (5–1 MEAC)
- Head coach: Bill Collick (7th season)
- Home stadium: Alumni Stadium

1991 Mid-Eastern Athletic Conference football standings
	Conf.					Overall
Team	W		L		T	W		L		T
Delaware State +	5	–	1	–	0	9	–	2	–	0
North Carolina A&T +	5	–	1	–	0	9	–	3	–	0
South Carolina State	3	–	3	–	0	7	–	4	–	0
Florida A&M	3	–	3	–	0	5	–	5	–	0
Bethune–Cookman	3	–	3	–	0	4	–	6	–	0
Howard	1	–	5	–	0	2	–	9	–	0
Morgan State	1	–	5	–	0	1	–	10	–	0
+ – Conference co-champions

The 1991 Delaware State Hornets football team represented Delaware State College (now known as Delaware State University) as a member of the Mid-Eastern Athletic Conference (MEAC) during the 1991 NCAA Division I-AA football season. Led by seventh-year head coach Bill Collick, the Hornets compiled an overall record of 9–2, with a mark of 5–1 in conference play, and finished as MEAC co-champion.

== Schedule ==
Date	Opponent	Site	Result	Attendance	Source
September 7	vs. Bethune–Cookman	Baynard Stadium; Wilmington, DE (Wilmington Classic)	W 20–28 (forfeit)	5,828	
September 14	No. 8 Youngstown State*	Alumni Stadium; Dover, DE	W 33–29		
September 21	at Towson State*	Minnegan Stadium; Towson, MD	W 13–7	3,729	
October 5	vs. Jackson State*	RFK Stadium; Washington, DC (Capitol Classic)	W 37–34	5,231	
October 12	Liberty*	Alumni Stadium; Dover, DE	L 9–20		
October 19	at Florida A&M	Bragg Memorial Stadium; Tallahassee, FL	L 10–20	10,418	
October 26	Morgan State^{†}	Alumni Stadium; Dover, DE	W 26–10	7,230	
November 2	at South Carolina State	Oliver C. Dawson Stadium; Orangeburg, SC	W 19–14	7,105	
November 9	at North Carolina A&T	Aggie Stadium; Greensboro, NC	W 31–26	8,609	
November 16	at Northeastern*	Parsons Field; Brookline, MA	W 46–20	1,240	
November 23	Howard	Alumni Stadium; Dover, DE	W 56–12		
*Non-conference game; ^{†}Homecoming; Rankings from NCAA Division I-AA Football Committee Poll released prior to the game
