= 1993 Texas Southern Tigers football team =

American college football season

1993 Texas Southern Tigers football
- Conference: Southwestern Athletic Conference
- Record: 2–9 (1–6 SWAC)
- Head coach: Wally Highsmith (5th season)
- Home stadium: Robertson Stadium; Astrodome; Durley Field

1993 Southwestern Athletic Conference football standings
	Conf.					Overall
Team	W		L		T	W		L		T
No. 15 Southern $	7	–	0	–	0	11	–	1	–	0
No. 23 Alcorn State	6	–	1	–	0	8	–	3	–	0
Grambling State	4	–	3	–	0	7	–	4	–	0
Jackson State	3	–	3	–	1	5	–	5	–	1
Alabama State	3	–	3	–	1	5	–	4	–	1
Mississippi Valley State	2	–	3	–	2	4	–	4	–	2
Texas Southern	1	–	6	–	0	2	–	9	–	0
Prairie View A&M	0	–	7	–	0	0	–	11	–	0
$ – Conference champion; Rankings from The Sports Network Poll

The 1993 Texas Southern Tigers football team represented Texas Southern University as a member of the Southwestern Athletic Conference (SWAC) during the 1993 NCAA Division I-AA football season. Led by fifth-year head coach Wally Highsmith, the Tigers compiled an overall record of 2–9, with a mark of 1–6 in conference play, and finished seventh in the SWAC.

== Schedule ==
Date	Opponent	Site	Result	Attendance	Source
September 4	Prairie View A&M	Robertson Stadium; Houston, TX (Labor Day Classic)	W 38–8		
September 11	at No. 15 Alcorn State	Mississippi Veterans Memorial Stadium; Jackson, MS	L 41–44		
September 18	at Nevada*	Mackay Stadium; Reno, NV	L 14–63		
September 25	vs. Central State (OH)*	Ohio Stadium; Columbus, OH (Capital City Classic)	L 6–55		
October 2	Knoxville*	Durley Field; Houston, TX	W 39–26		
October 9	No. 19 Southern	Astrodome; Houston, TX	L 7–48		
October 16	Alabama State	Durley Field; Houston, TX	L 26–28		
October 30	at Grambling State	Eddie G. Robinson Memorial Stadium; Grambling, LA	L 26–50		
November 6	at Jackson State	Mississippi Veterans Memorial Stadium; Jackson, MS	L 12–38		
November 13	at East Texas State*	Memorial Stadium; Commerce, TX	L 7–16	600	
November 20	at Mississippi Valley State	Magnolia Stadium; Itta Bena, MS	L 27–41		
*Non-conference game; Rankings from The Sports Network Poll released prior to the game
