= Human Jukebox =

Marching band of Southern University

The Human Jukebox
- Nickname: The Jukebox
- School: Southern University and A&M College
- Location: Baton Rouge, Louisiana
- Conference: SWAC
- Founded: 1947
- Director: Dr. Kedric D Taylor
- Members: 270
- Website: Official Human Jukebox website

The Human Jukebox is the marching band representing Southern University and A&M College located in Baton Rouge, Louisiana.

== Band profile ==
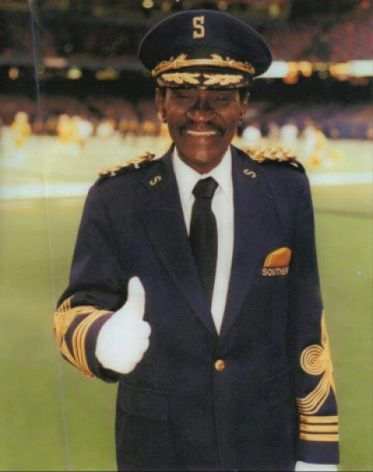
Longtime Director of Bands, Dr. Isaac Greggs "Doc" (1969-2005)

T. Leroy Davis is credited with establishing Southern University's marching band and served as the band director between 1947 and 1964. He also helped organize the first Southern University Band Festival and Band Day and was well-known for his contributions and achievements in music. Davis was given the title of Professor Emeritus for his many years of service to the university in 1989.

The band is anchored by the Isaac Greggs Band Hall on campus. Dr. Isaac Greggs (Doc) was an award-winning band director and alumnus of Southern University who led the band for 36 years (1969 - 2005). Under his leadership, the band grew in popularity and established a distinctive identity. In addition to having the band hall renamed in his honor, he was inducted into the Louisiana Black History Hall of Fame in 2013 and had a display case dedicated in his honor at the National Museum of African American History and Culture in 2016.

According to the NCAA, the Human Jukebox is recognized as one of the top marching bands in the nation. The band`s performances are noted for their volume, distinctive musical arrangements, and varied repertoire.

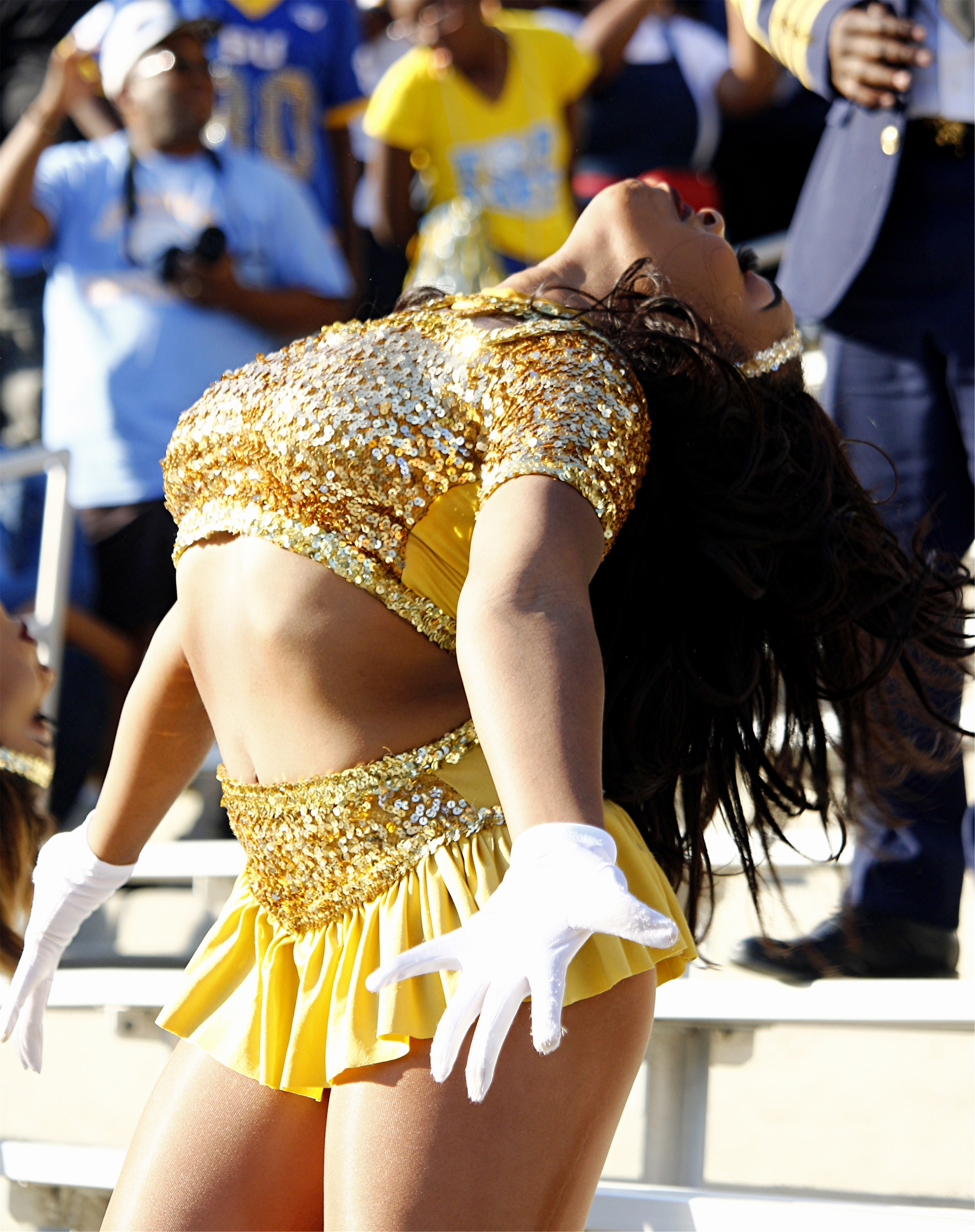
The Fabulous Dancing Dolls

Since 1969, the Human Jukebox has often been accompanied by The Fabulous Dancing Dolls. Gracie Perkins co-founded the Dolls with Dr. Greggs. The Dolls are best known for their beauty standards, stylish dance uniforms, and graceful choreography. A notable highlight in Dolls' history is when they were invited to perform with world pop-star Madonna for her live Super Bowl halftime performance in 2012. In 2019, the Dolls were shown in Beyonce's Netflix documentary "HΘMΣCΘMING: A film by Beyonce". In 2022, the Dolls starred in an eight-episode docu-series executive-produced by NBA player Chris Paul on ESPN+ entitled "Why Not Us: Southern Dance".

One of the most anticipated traditions of the Human Jukebox is the Friday night "Battle of the Bands" versus Grambling's "World Famed" Tiger Marching Band during Bayou Classic weekend in the Mercedes-Benz Superdome. The annual event draws tens of thousands of alumni, fans, and spectators. Clips of it are aired on NBC's nationally televised broadcast of Saturday's football game. A YouTube video of the Human Jukebox's soulful rendition of Adele's hit single "Hello" from the 2015 Bayou Classic Battle of the Bands went viral , which resulted in the band garnering overwhelmingly positive press both nationally and internationally. The video received over 1 million views in less than two weeks and was one of the nation's top trending topics on social media the week of its release. In 2019, Vice Media released a documentary detailing the historical and cultural significance of the Human Jukebox and their annual band battle against Grambling's "World-Famed" Tiger Marching band in New Orleans.

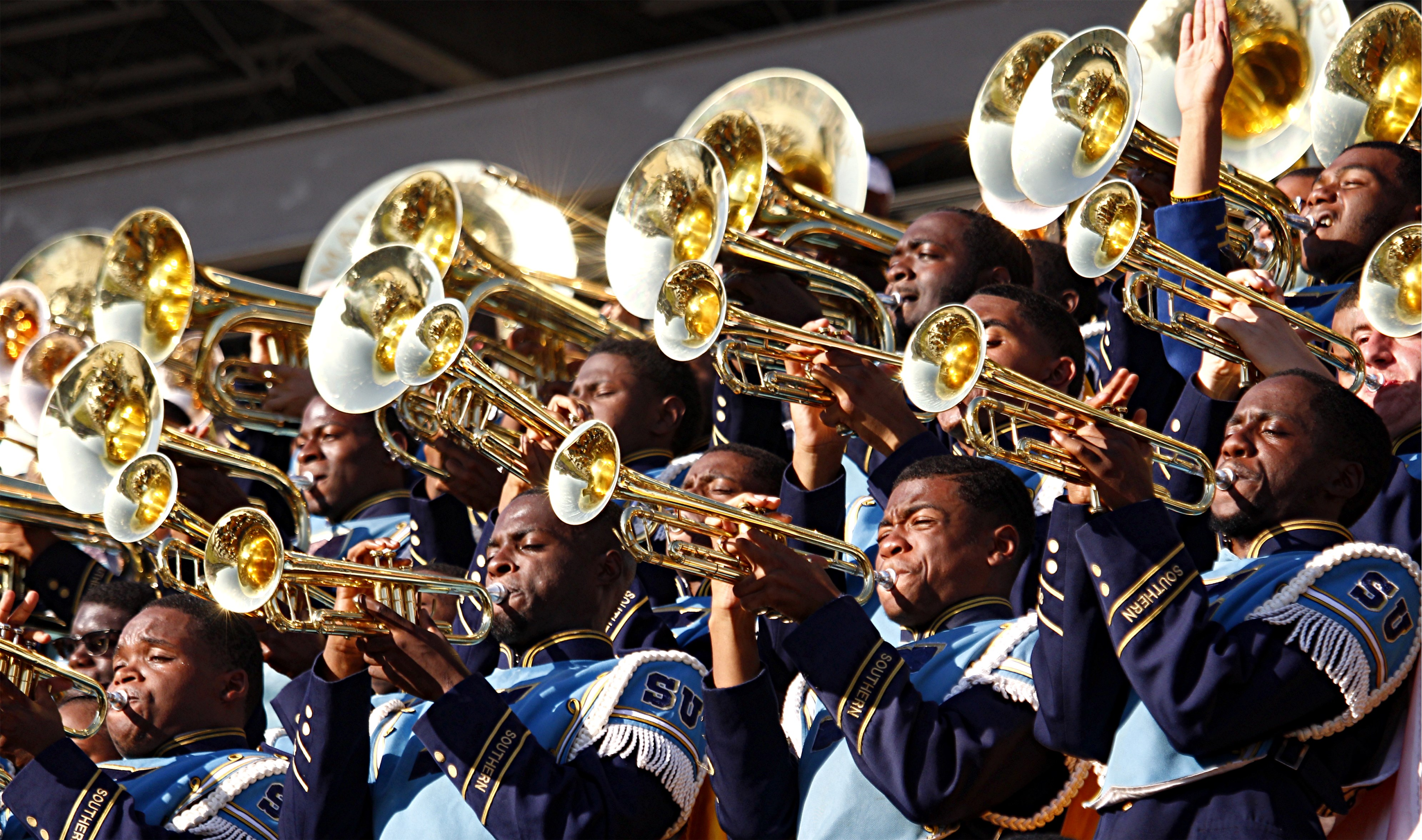
The brass section

In October 2017, Raising Cane's Chicken Fingers (Baton Rouge-based national restaurant corporation) announced a partnership with The Southern University Human Jukebox, making Raising Cane's the "Official Chicken of the SU Human Jukebox." At the 2017 Bayou Classic Battle of the Bands, State Representative Ted James & J Morgan & Associates unveiled the official Human Jukebox state license plate for the citizens of Louisiana, making The Human Jukebox the first marching band in the nation with a license plate.

The Human Jukebox has performed at the Super Bowl six times as of 2020 and has a long-standing reputation of making appearances at many types of highly visible events. For example, in 1997, the Human Jukebox performed at the inaugural parade for President Bill Clinton. In 2015, the Human Jukebox performed for the grand introduction of Floyd Mayweather in the MGM Grand Arena of Las Vegas for "his bout with Manny Pacquiao". Lizzo featured the Human Jukebox and Fabulous Dancing Dolls in her 2019 music video "Good as Hell". The Human Jukebox and Fabulous Dancing Dolls traveled to Pasadena, California, in December 2019 to participate in the 131st Rose Parade. This was the marching band's second appearance in the parade, with the first occurring 40 years ago in 1980.

The Human Jukebox is a popular collegiate marching band with over 200,000 followers on Facebook, over 100,000 subscribers on YouTube, over 100,000 followers on Instagram, and several social media videos reaching over 1 million views.

== Primary repertoire ==
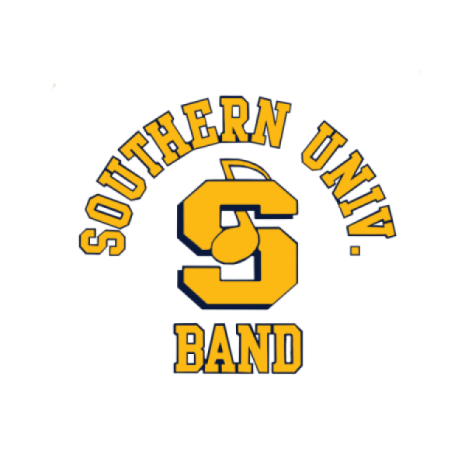
The exclusive "S" logo is issued only to current and/or alumni members.

The Human Jukebox's primary repertoire includes the following:

- The SU Alma Mater
- The SU Fight Song
- The SU Spirit Song, inspired by a 19th-century Gospel song
- "Do Watcha Wanna", a New Orleans brass band classic
- "Talkin' Out the Side of Your Neck", a Funk/R&B classic by Cameo
- "I Don't Give A", a Hip-Hop song by Lil Jon & The East Side Boyz.
- "Got My Whiskey", a Blues/R&B song by Mel Waiters
- "Black and Blues", a Jazz/R&B song by Al Jarreau
- "I'm So Glad I Go to Southern U.", inspired by "I'm So Glad" from Delta blues legend Skip James

== Band leadership ==
leadership Name	Name
Director	Dr. Kedric D. Taylor
Associate Director of Bands	William J. Young
Assistant Director	Kenneth Collins
Arranger	Jaron “Bear” Williams
Percussion Instructor	Lorenzo Hart
Business Manager	Sandra Byrd
Program Manager	Myrikle J. Rosette
Fabulous Dancing Dolls Sponsor	Traci Greene
Announcer	Darren Bedell
Human Jukebox Media Director	Garrett Edgerson
Drum Major ('24-'26)	Demarcus Hill
Fabulous Dancing Dolls captain ('26 - '27)	Oriana Walton

== See also ==
- BoomBox Classic
- Bayou Classic
- Honda Battle of the Bands
