= 1991 Alcorn State Braves football team =

American college football season

1991 Alcorn State Braves football
- Conference: Southwestern Athletic Conference
- Record: 7–2–1 (4–2–1 SWAC)
- Head coach: Cardell Jones (1st season)
- Home stadium: Henderson Stadium

1991 Southwestern Athletic Conference football standings
| | Conf. | | | | | Overall |
| Team | W | | L | | T | W | | L | | T |
|---|---|---|---|---|---|---|---|---|---|---|
| No. 5 Alabama State $ | 6 | – | 0 | – | 1 | 11 | – | 0 | – | 1 |
| Alcorn State | 4 | – | 2 | – | 1 | 7 | – | 2 | – | 1 |
| Southern | 4 | – | 3 | – | 0 | 4 | – | 7 | – | 0 |
| Texas Southern | 3 | – | 3 | – | 1 | 5 | – | 5 | – | 1 |
| Mississippi Valley State | 3 | – | 3 | – | 1 | 7 | – | 3 | – | 1 |
| Jackson State | 3 | – | 4 | – | 0 | 5 | – | 5 | – | 0 |
| Grambling State | 3 | – | 4 | – | 0 | 5 | – | 6 | – | 0 |
| Prairie View A&M | 0 | – | 7 | – | 0 | 0 | – | 11 | – | 0 |
$ – Conference champion; Rankings from NCAA Division I-AA Football Committee poll

The 1991 Alcorn State Braves football team represented Alcorn State University as a member of the Southwestern Athletic Conference (SWAC) during the 1991 NCAA Division I-AA football season. Led by first-year head coach Cardell Jones, the Braves compiled an overall record of 7–2–1, with a conference record of 4–2–1, and finished second in the SWAC.

== Schedule ==
| Date | Opponent | Site | Result | Attendance | Source |
|---|---|---|---|---|---|
| September 7 | vs. Grambling State | Independence Stadium; Shreveport, LA (Red River Classic) | W 27–22 | | |
| September 14 | vs. Alabama A&M* | Texas Stadium; Irving, TX (Big D Classic) | W 38–10 | 7,500 | |
| September 21 | at No. 15 Alabama State | Cramton Bowl; Montgomery, AL | L 13–18 | | |
| September 26 | vs. Hampton* | Pontiac Silverdome; Pontiac, MI (Operation Education Classic) | W 67–14 | 10,000 | |
| October 5 | vs. Howard* | Hoosier Dome; Indianapolis, IN (Circle City Classic) | W 46–27 | 61,000 | |
| October 12 | at Texas Southern | Robertson Stadium; Houston, TX | L 7–26 | | |
| October 19 | Prairie View A&M | Henderson Stadium; Lorman, MS | W 61–0 | | |
| October 26 | at Southern | A. W. Mumford Stadium; Baton Rouge, LA | W 52–29 | | |
| November 9 | Mississippi Valley State | Henderson Stadium; Lorman, MS | T 28–28 | | |
| November 23 | at Jackson State | Mississippi Veterans Memorial Stadium; Jackson, MS (Soul Bowl) | W 18–16 | 35,500 | |
*Non-conference game; Rankings from NCAA Division I-AA Football Committee Poll released prior to the game

== After the season ==
=== NFL draft ===
The following Braves were selected in the 1992 NFL draft following the season.

| Round | Pick | Player | Position | NFL team |
|---|---|---|---|---|
| 5 | 138 | Torrance Small | Wide receiver | New Orleans Saints |
| 11 | 305 | Cedric Tillman | Wide receiver | Denver Broncos |
