= 1991 Prairie View A&M Panthers football team =

American college football season

1991 Prairie View A&M Panthers football
- Conference: Southwestern Athletic Conference
- Record: 0–11 (0–7 SWAC)
- Head coach: Ronald Beard (1st season)
- Offensive coordinator: Darwin Valentine (1st season)
- Defensive coordinator: Douglas Fowlkes (1st season)
- Home stadium: Edward L. Blackshear Field

1991 Southwestern Athletic Conference football standings
	Conf.					Overall
Team	W		L		T	W		L		T
No. 5 Alabama State $	6	–	0	–	1	11	–	0	–	1
Alcorn State	4	–	2	–	1	7	–	2	–	1
Southern	4	–	3	–	0	4	–	7	–	0
Texas Southern	3	–	3	–	1	5	–	5	–	1
Mississippi Valley State	3	–	3	–	1	7	–	3	–	1
Jackson State	3	–	4	–	0	5	–	5	–	0
Grambling State	3	–	4	–	0	5	–	6	–	0
Prairie View A&M	0	–	7	–	0	0	–	11	–	0
$ – Conference champion; Rankings from NCAA Division I-AA Football Committee poll

The 1991 Prairie View A&M Panthers football team represented Prairie View A&M University as a member of the Southwestern Athletic Conference (SWAC) during the 1991 NCAA Division I-AA football season. Led by first-year head coach Ronald Beard, the Panthers compiled an overall record of 0–11, with a mark of 0–7 in conference play, and finished eighth in the SWAC.

Due to several handicaps, including not having any scholarships, Beard later referred to the team as a "intramural or club football" team.

== Schedule ==
Date	Time	Opponent	Site	Result	Attendance	Source
September 7	7:30 p.m.	at Texas Southern	Rice Stadium; Houston, TX (Labor Day Classic)	L 6–23		
September 14	7:30 p.m.	at Angelo State*	San Angelo Stadium; San Angelo, TX	L 0–55		
September 21	7:00 p.m.	at Southwest Missouri State*	Briggs Stadium; Springfield, MO	L 0–61	11,835	
September 28	7:30 p.m.	at Texas A&I*	Javelina Stadium; Kingsville, TX	L 3–41		
October 5	7:00 p.m.	at Grambling State	Eddie G. Robinson Memorial Stadium; Grambling, LA (rivalry)	L 7–77	10,350	
October 12	1:30 p.m.	Cameron*	Edward L. Blackshear Field; Prairie View, TX	L 6–51		
October 19	1:30 p.m.	at Alcorn State	Henderson Stadium; Lorman, MS	L 0–61		
October 26	1:30 p.m.	vs. No. 7 Alabama State	War Memorial Stadium; Little Rock, AR (Arkansas Classic)	L 0–92		
November 2	1:30 p.m.	Mississippi Valley State^{†}	Edward L. Blackshear Field; Prairie View, TX	L 0–41		
November 9	2:00 p.m.	at Southwest Texas State*	Bobcat Stadium; San Marcos, TX	L 6–59		
November 23	7:00 p.m.	at Southern	A. W. Mumford Stadium; Baton Rouge, LA	L 20–56		
*Non-conference game; ^{†}Homecoming; Rankings from NCAA Division I-AA Football Committee Poll released prior to the game; All times are in Central time

== Personnel ==
1991 Prairie View A&M Panthers football team roster
Players
Coaches
Offense

Pos.	#	Name	Class
WR	2	Tony Johnson	Sr
WR	4	Tracy Crawford	Sr
WR	7	Bo Gillard	So
WR	8	Jamal Myers	Fr
QB	10	Kevin Phillips	Sr
QB	11	Andre Riser	Fr
QB	12	Dwayne Joubert	Fr
QB	14	Errick Wilson	Fr
WR	16	Henry Lott	Fr
WR	17	James Washington	Fr
QB	18	Danny Hull	Jr
RB	23	Eric Washington	So
WR	24	Dometrius Hill	So
RB	26	Paul Releford	So
RB	32	Donald Brown	So
RB	33	Earl Smith	Sr
RB	34	Jacques Denkins	Sr

Defense

Pos.	#	Name	Class
DB	3	Michael Newton	Fr
DB	5	Adrian Mosley	So
DL	9	Duane Sims	So
LB	20	Travis Simpson	Fr
DB	21	Courtney Parkham	So
DB	22	Gene Coleman	Fr
DB	25	Anthony Campbell	So
DB	27	Eugene Blackwell	Fr
DB	28	Martin Davis	Sr
DB	29	Dominique Artis	Jr
DB	36	Joseph Davis	Fr
DB	37	Jerald Crowder	Fr

Special teams

Pos.	#	Name	Class
P	1	Samuel Bonner	So

Head coach

- Ronald Beard

Coordinators/assistant coaches

- Darwin Valentine
  Offensive coordinator/Offensive line
- Douglas Fowlkes
  Defensive coordinator/Defensive line
- Bob Atkins
  Secondary
- John Scott
  Linebackers
- William Wooley
  Receivers
- Clifton Gilliard
  Running backs
- John Mayes
  Athletic trainer

Legend

- (C) Team captain
- (S) Suspended
- (I) Ineligible
- Injured
- Redshirt

Roster
Last update: October 12, 1991
