= 1991 Alabama State Hornets football team =

American college football season

1991 Alabama State Hornets football

Black college national champion SWAC champion

Heritage Bowl, W 36–13 vs. North Carolina A&T
- Conference: Southwestern Athletic Conference
- Record: 11–0–1 (6–0–1 SWAC)
- Head coach: Houston Markham (5th season)
- Offensive coordinator: John McKenzie (2nd season)
- Home stadium: Cramton Bowl

1991 Southwestern Athletic Conference football standings
| | Conf. | | | | | Overall |
| Team | W | | L | | T | W | | L | | T |
|---|---|---|---|---|---|---|---|---|---|---|
| No. 5 Alabama State $ | 6 | – | 0 | – | 1 | 11 | – | 0 | – | 1 |
| Alcorn State | 4 | – | 2 | – | 1 | 7 | – | 2 | – | 1 |
| Southern | 4 | – | 3 | – | 0 | 4 | – | 7 | – | 0 |
| Texas Southern | 3 | – | 3 | – | 1 | 5 | – | 5 | – | 1 |
| Mississippi Valley State | 3 | – | 3 | – | 1 | 7 | – | 3 | – | 1 |
| Jackson State | 3 | – | 4 | – | 0 | 5 | – | 5 | – | 0 |
| Grambling State | 3 | – | 4 | – | 0 | 5 | – | 6 | – | 0 |
| Prairie View A&M | 0 | – | 7 | – | 0 | 0 | – | 11 | – | 0 |
$ – Conference champion; Rankings from NCAA Division I-AA Football Committee poll

The 1991 Alabama State Hornets football team represented Alabama State University as a member of the Southwestern Athletic Conference (SWAC) during the 1991 NCAA Division I-AA football season. Led by fifth-year head coach Houston Markham, the Hornets compiled an overall record of 11–0–1, with a conference record of 6–0–1, and finished as SWAC champion. At the conclusion of the season, the Hornets were also recognized as black college national champion.

== Schedule ==
| Date | Time | Opponent | Rank | Site | Result | Attendance | Source |
|---|---|---|---|---|---|---|---|
| August 31 | | vs. Jackson State | | Atlanta–Fulton County Stadium; Atlanta, GA (Bill Lucas Memorial Labor Day Classic) | W 28–27 | 32,857 | |
| September 14 | | vs. Southern | No. 18 | Ladd Stadium; Mobile, AL (Gulf Coast Classic) | W 19–16 | 32,000 | |
| September 21 | | Alcorn State | No. 15 | Cramton Bowl; Montgomery, AL | W 18–13 | | |
| September 28 | | Troy State* | No. 15 | Cramton Bowl; Montgomery, AL | W 22–19 | 14,300 | |
| October 5 | | at Texas Southern | No. 11 | Robertson Stadium; Houston, TX | T 14–14 | | |
| October 19 | | No. 19 Samford* | No. 11 | Cramton Bowl; Montgomery, AL | W 31–28 | | |
| October 26 | 1:30 p.m. | vs. Prairie View A&M | No. 7 | War Memorial Stadium; Little Rock, AR (Arkansas Classic) | W 92–0 | | |
| November 2 | | vs. Alabama A&M* | No. 6 | Legion Field; Birmingham, AL (Magic City Classic) | W 59–13 | 70,200 | |
| November 9 | | vs. Grambling State | No. 5 | Pontiac Silverdome; Pontiac, MI (Motor City Classic) | W 60–14 | 44,692 | |
| November 16 | | at Mississippi Valley State | No. 5 | Magnolia Stadium; Itta Bena, MS | W 48–20 | | |
| November 28 | | Johnson C. Smith* | No. 5 | Cramton Bowl; Montgomery, AL | W 62–6 | 15,780 | |
| December 21 | | vs. North Carolina A&T* | No. 5 | Joe Robbie Stadium; Miami Gardens, FL (Heritage Bowl) | W 36–13 | 7,724 | |
*Non-conference game; Rankings from NCAA Division I-AA Football Committee Poll released prior to the game; All times are in Central time

== After the season ==
=== NFL draft ===
The Hornets were selected in the 1992 NFL draft following the season.

| Round | Pick | Player | Position | NFL team |
|---|---|---|---|---|
| 2 | 50 | Eddie Robinson Jr. | Linebacker | Houston Oilers |
| 8 | 198 | Rickey Jones | Quarterback | Los Angeles Rams |
