= 1991 South Carolina State Bulldogs football team =

American college football season

1991 South Carolina State Bulldogs football
- Conference: Mid-Eastern Athletic Conference
- Record: 7–4 (3–3 MEAC)
- Head coach: Willie Jeffries (9th season)
- Home stadium: Oliver C. Dawson Stadium

1991 Mid-Eastern Athletic Conference football standings
	Conf.					Overall
Team	W		L		T	W		L		T
Delaware State +	5	–	1	–	0	9	–	2	–	0
North Carolina A&T +	5	–	1	–	0	9	–	3	–	0
South Carolina State	3	–	3	–	0	7	–	4	–	0
Florida A&M	3	–	3	–	0	5	–	5	–	0
Bethune–Cookman	3	–	3	–	0	4	–	6	–	0
Howard	1	–	5	–	0	2	–	9	–	0
Morgan State	1	–	5	–	0	1	–	10	–	0
+ – Conference co-champions

The 1991 South Carolina State Bulldogs football team represented South Carolina State College (now known as South Carolina State University) as a member of the Mid-Eastern Athletic Conference (MEAC) during the 1991 NCAA Division I-AA football season. Led by ninth-year head coach Willie Jeffries, the Bulldogs compiled an overall record of 7–4, with a mark of 3–3 in conference play, and finished tied for third in the MEAC.

== Schedule ==
Date	Opponent	Site	Result	Attendance	Source
September 7	Newberry*	Oliver C. Dawson Stadium; Orangeburg, SC	W 28–7	9,182	
September 21	at Howard	William H. Greene Stadium; Washington, DC	W 10–5		
September 28	vs. Southern*	Bobby Dodd Stadium; Atlanta, GA (Atlanta Football Classic)	W 30–23	26,560	
October 5	Johnson C. Smith*	Oliver C. Dawson Stadium; Orangeburg, SC	W 50–0	7,344	
October 12	at Morgan State	Hughes Stadium; Baltimore, MD	W 21–6	7,231	
October 19	vs. Bethune–Cookman	Lockhart Stadium; Fort Lauderdale, FL (South Florida Football Classic)	L 21–24 ^{OT}	9,500	
October 26	vs. Florida A&M	Williams–Brice Stadium; Columbia, SC (Palmetto Football Classic)	W 21–7	46,000	
November 2	Delaware State	Oliver C. Dawson Stadium; Orangeburg, SC	L 14–19	7,105	
November 9	Charleston Southern*^{†}	Oliver C. Dawson Stadium; Orangeburg, SC	W 12–0	4,602	
November 16	vs. Jackson State*	Ladd Stadium; Mobile, AL (Hank Aaron Classic)	L 6–17	9,200	
November 23	North Carolina A&T	Oliver C. Dawson Stadium; Orangeburg, SC (rivalry)	L 21–49	10,669	
*Non-conference game; ^{†}Homecoming
