= 1993 Prairie View A&M Panthers football team =

American college football season

1993 Prairie View A&M Panthers football
- Conference: Southwestern Athletic Conference
- Record: 0–11 (0–7 SWAC)
- Head coach: Ronald Beard (3rd season)
- Offensive coordinator: Darwin Valentine (3rd season)
- Defensive coordinator: Douglas Fowlkes (3rd season)
- Home stadium: Edward L. Blackshear Field

1993 Southwestern Athletic Conference football standings
	Conf.					Overall
Team	W		L		T	W		L		T
No. 15 Southern $	7	–	0	–	0	11	–	1	–	0
No. 23 Alcorn State	6	–	1	–	0	8	–	3	–	0
Grambling State	4	–	3	–	0	7	–	4	–	0
Jackson State	3	–	3	–	1	5	–	5	–	1
Alabama State	3	–	3	–	1	5	–	4	–	1
Mississippi Valley State	2	–	3	–	2	4	–	4	–	2
Texas Southern	1	–	6	–	0	2	–	9	–	0
Prairie View A&M	0	–	7	–	0	0	–	11	–	0
$ – Conference champion; Rankings from The Sports Network Poll

The 1993 Prairie View A&M Panthers football team represented Prairie View A&M University as a member of the Southwestern Athletic Conference (SWAC) during the 1993 NCAA Division I-AA football season. Led by third-year head coach Ronald Beard, the Panthers compiled an overall record of 0–11, with a mark of 0–7 in conference play, and finished eighth in the SWAC.

== Schedule ==
Date	Opponent	Site	Result	Attendance	Source
September 4	at Texas Southern	Robertson Stadium; Houston, TX (Labor Day Classic)	L 8–38		
September 11	at Langston*	Anderson Stadium; Langston, OK	L 8–45		
September 18	at Southern	A. W. Mumford Stadium; Baton Rouge, LA	L 6–46		
October 2	vs. Grambling State	Cotton Bowl; Dallas, TX (rivalry)	L 0–49	61,500	
October 9	West Texas A&M*	Edward L. Blackshear Field; Prairie View, TX	L 6–28		
October 16	at No. 15 Alcorn State	Jack Spinks Stadium; Lorman, MS	L 10–31		
October 23	at Alabama State	Cramton Bowl; Montgomery, AL	L 6–37		
October 30	Mississippi Valley State	Edward L. Blackshear Field; Prairie View, TX	L 6–42		
November 6	Arkansas–Pine Bluff*	Edward L. Blackshear Field; Prairie View, TX	L 8–12		
November 13	Jackson State	Edward L. Blackshear Field; Prairie View, TX	L 7–37	1,013	
November 20	at UAB*	Legion Field; Birmingham, AL	L 12–58	4,181	
*Non-conference game; Rankings from NCAA Division I-AA Football Committee Poll released prior to the game
