= 1993 Alabama State Hornets football team =

American college football season

1993 Alabama State Hornets football
- Conference: Southwestern Athletic Conference
- Record: 5–4–1 (3–3–1 SWAC)
- Head coach: Houston Markham (7th season)
- Home stadium: Cramton Bowl

1993 Southwestern Athletic Conference football standings
	Conf.					Overall
Team	W		L		T	W		L		T
No. 15 Southern $	7	–	0	–	0	11	–	1	–	0
No. 23 Alcorn State	6	–	1	–	0	8	–	3	–	0
Grambling State	4	–	3	–	0	7	–	4	–	0
Jackson State	3	–	3	–	1	5	–	5	–	1
Alabama State	3	–	3	–	1	5	–	4	–	1
Mississippi Valley State	2	–	3	–	2	4	–	4	–	2
Texas Southern	1	–	6	–	0	2	–	9	–	0
Prairie View A&M	0	–	7	–	0	0	–	11	–	0
$ – Conference champion; Rankings from The Sports Network Poll

The 1993 Alabama State Hornets football team represented Alabama State University as a member of the Southwestern Athletic Conference (SWAC) during the 1993 NCAA Division I-AA football season. Led by seventh-year head coach Houston Markham, the Hornets compiled an overall record of 5–4–1, with a mark of 3–3–1 in conference play, and finished tied for fourth in the SWAC.

== Schedule ==
Date	Opponent	Site	Result	Attendance	Source
September 11	vs. Southern	Ladd Stadium; Mobile, AL (Gulf Coast Classic)	L 14–23		
September 18	Alcorn State	Cramton Bowl; Montgomery, AL	L 25–28		
September 25	No. 5 Troy State*	Cramton Bowl; Montgomery, AL	L 3–38	19,137	
October 9	at Jackson State	Mississippi Veterans Memorial Stadium; Jackson, MS	L 15–17		
October 16	at Texas Southern	Durley Field; Houston, TX	W 28–26		
October 23	Prairie View A&M	Cramton Bowl; Montgomery, AL	W 37–6		
October 30	vs. Alabama A&M*	Legion Field; Birmingham, AL (Magic City Classic)	W 7–0	47,831	
November 6	Grambling State	Cramton Bowl; Montgomery, AL	W 16–10		
November 13	at Mississippi Valley State	Magnolia Stadium; Itta Bena, MS	T 14–14		
November 25	Tuskegee*	Cramton Bowl; Montgomery, AL (Turkey Day Classic)	W 31–30		
*Non-conference game; Rankings from NCAA Division I-AA Football Committee Poll released prior to the game
