= Pete Richardson =

American football player and coach (born 1946)

Biographical details
- Born: October 17, 1946 (age 80); Youngstown, Ohio, U.S.

Playing career
- 1960s: Dayton
- 1969–1971: Buffalo Bills
- Position: Defensive back

Coaching career (HC unless noted)
- 1973–1976: Dunbar HS (OH) (assistant)
- 1977–1978: Dunbar HS (OH)
- 1979–1982: Winston-Salem State (assistant)
- 1983–1997: Winston-Salem State (DC)
- 1988–1992: Winston-Salem State
- 1993–2009: Southern

Head coaching record
- Overall: 169–76–1 (college)
- Bowls: 4–2
- Tournaments: 0–3 (NCAA D-II playoffs)

Accomplishments and honors

Championships
- 5 black college national (1993, 1995, 1997–1998, 2003); 3 CIAA (1988, 1990–1991); 5 SWAC (1993, 1997–1999, 2003); 3 CIAA Southern Division (1988–1990)

Pete Richardson (born October 17, 1946) is an American former professional football defensive back in the National Football League (NFL) and former college head coach.

Richardson played college football at University of Dayton, and was drafted by the Buffalo Bills in the sixth round of the 1968 NFL/AFL draft. He played for the Bills for three years until a knee injury ended his playing career.

Richardson began his coaching career in the late 1970s at the high school football ranks in Dayton, Ohio, before moving up to NCAA Division II football in 1979 as he joined the coaching staff at Winston-Salem State University in Winston-Salem, North Carolina. In 1988, Richardson became the head coach of the Winston-Salem State Rams, succeeding Bill Hayes, who left to become the head football coach at North Carolina A&T State University. Richardson served as head coach from 1988 to 1992, compiling a win–loss record of 41–14–1, winning three Central Intercollegiate Athletic Association (CIAA) championships—in 1988, 1990, 1991—and leading the Rams to two appearances in the NCAA Division II Football Championship playoffs, in 1990 and 1991.

Richardson left the Winston-Salem State in 1993 to become head football coach at Southern University in Baton Rouge, Louisiana. During his tenure at Southern, the Jaguars won five Southwestern Athletic Conference (SWAC) championships, including three consecutives titles from 1997 to 1999, as well four black college football national championships, in 1993, 1995, 1997, and 2003. His teams also made six appearances in the Heritage Bowl, a postseason bowl game for historically black colleges and universities (HBCUs). Richardson compiled a win–loss record of 134–62 in 17 seasons as head coach, making him the second winningest coach in program history behind coach Ace Mumford. He is the only coach in the history of the Jaguars football program to have an undefeated record against College Football Hall of Fame coach Eddie Robinson of the rival Grambling State Tigers in the Bayou Classic.

Richardso has collected many accolades allocated to football coaches of HBCUs, such as the Black Coaches Association's Coach of the Year in 1998, five-time SWAC Coach of the Year (1995, 1997, 1998, 1999 and 2003), Atlanta's 100% Wrong Club's Coach of the Year (1995, 1997, 1998, 1999 and 2003), Washington D.C.'s Pigskin Club's Coach of the Year (1995, 1998 and 2003), the Kodak Region IV Coach of the Year (1995) and the Sheridan Broadcasting Network's Coach of the Year (1997 and 2003).

== Head coaching record ==
=== College ===
Year	Team	Overall	Conference	Standing	Bowl/playoffs	NCAA^{#}	TSN^{°}
Winston-Salem State Rams (Central Intercollegiate Athletic Association) (1988–1992)
1988	Winston-Salem State	10–2	5–1	1st (Southern)	L NCAA Division II First Round	5	
1989	Winston-Salem State	8–2	5–1	1st (Southern)		10	
1990	Winston-Salem State	7–4–1	4–1–1	1st (Southern)	L NCAA Division II First Round		
1991	Winston-Salem State	9–2	6–0	1st	L NCAA Division II First Round	12	
1992	Winston-Salem State	7–4	5–1	2nd			
Winston-Salem State:		41–14–1	25–4–1				
Southern Jaguars (Southwestern Athletic Conference) (1993–2009)
1993	Southern	11–1	7–0	1st	W Heritage		15
1994	Southern	6–5	5–2	3rd			
1995	Southern	11–1	6–1	2nd	W Heritage		11
1996	Southern	7–5	5–2	T–2nd	L Heritage		
1997	Southern	11–1	8–0	1st	W Heritage		12
1998	Southern	9–3	8–0	1st	W Heritage		14
1999	Southern	11–2	4–0	1st (West)	L Heritage		17
2000	Southern	6–5	4–3	T–3rd (West)			
2001	Southern	7–4	5–2	2nd (West)			
2002	Southern	6–6	5–2	2nd (West)			
2003	Southern	12–1	6–1	T–1st (West)			13
2004	Southern	8–4	6–1	1st (West)			
2005	Southern	4–5	4–5	2nd (West)			
2006	Southern	5–6	4–5	2nd (West)			
2007	Southern	8–3	6–3	2nd (West)			
2008	Southern	6–5	5–2	3rd (West)			
2009	Southern	0–5	0–5	5th (West)			
Southern:		128–62	88–34				
Total:		169–76–1					
National championship Conference title Conference division title or championship game berth
