= 1991 Florida A&M Rattlers football team =

American college football season

1991 Florida A&M Rattlers football
- Conference: Mid-Eastern Athletic Conference
- Record: 6–5 (3–3 MEAC)
- Head coach: Ken Riley (6th season)
- Offensive coordinator: Kent Schoolfield (3rd season)
- Home stadium: Bragg Memorial Stadium

1991 Mid-Eastern Athletic Conference football standings
	Conf.					Overall
Team	W		L		T	W		L		T
Delaware State +	5	–	1	–	0	9	–	2	–	0
North Carolina A&T +	5	–	1	–	0	9	–	3	–	0
South Carolina State	3	–	3	–	0	7	–	4	–	0
Florida A&M	3	–	3	–	0	5	–	5	–	0
Bethune–Cookman	3	–	3	–	0	4	–	6	–	0
Howard	1	–	5	–	0	2	–	9	–	0
Morgan State	1	–	5	–	0	1	–	10	–	0
+ – Conference co-champions

The 1991 Florida A&M Rattlers football team represented Florida A&M University as a member of the Mid-Eastern Athletic Conference (MEAC) during the 1991 NCAA Division I-AA football season. Led by sixth-year head coach Ken Riley, the Rattlers compiled an overall record of 6–5, with a mark of 3–3 in conference play, and finished tied for thied in the MEAC.

== Schedule ==
Date	Opponent	Site	Result	Attendance	Source
September 7	Tuskegee*	Bragg Memorial Stadium; Tallahassee, FL	W 47–24	15,854	
September 14	at Howard	William H. Greene Stadium; Washington, DC	L 21–28	15,505	
September 21	No. 9 Georgia Southern*	Bragg Memorial Stadium; Tallahassee, FL	L 21–28	12,525	
September 28	vs. Tennessee State*	Atlanta–Fulton County Stadium; Atlanta, GA (Atlanta Football Classic)	W 43–7	49,767	
October 12	at North Carolina A&T	Aggie Stadium; Greensboro, NC	L 19–41	9,961	
October 19	Delaware State	Bragg Memorial Stadium; Tallahassee, FL	W 20–10	10,418	
October 26	vs. South Carolina State	Williams–Brice Stadium; Columbia, SC (Palmetto Football Classic)	L 7–21	46,000	
November 2	Morgan State	Bragg Memorial Stadium; Tallahassee, FL	W 55–6	27,132	
November 9	vs. Southern*	Joe Robbie Stadium; Miami Gardens, FL (Orange Blossom Classic)	W 24–20	20,503	
November 16	at Grambling State*	Eddie G. Robinson Memorial Stadium; Grambling, LA	L 22–25	7,001	
November 30	vs. Bethune–Cookman	Tampa Stadium; Tampa, FL (Florida Classic)	W 46–28	40,249	
*Non-conference game; Rankings from NCAA Division I-AA Football Committee Poll released prior to the game
