= 1993 Mississippi Valley State Delta Devils football team =

American college football season

1993 Mississippi Valley State Delta Devils football
- Conference: Southwestern Athletic Conference
- Record: 4–4–2 (2–3–2 SWAC)
- Head coach: Larry Dorsey (4th season)
- Home stadium: Magnolia Stadium

1993 Southwestern Athletic Conference football standings
	Conf.					Overall
Team	W		L		T	W		L		T
No. 15 Southern $	7	–	0	–	0	11	–	1	–	0
No. 23 Alcorn State	6	–	1	–	0	8	–	3	–	0
Grambling State	4	–	3	–	0	7	–	4	–	0
Jackson State	3	–	3	–	1	5	–	5	–	1
Alabama State	3	–	3	–	1	5	–	4	–	1
Mississippi Valley State	2	–	3	–	2	4	–	4	–	2
Texas Southern	1	–	6	–	0	2	–	9	–	0
Prairie View A&M	0	–	7	–	0	0	–	11	–	0
$ – Conference champion; Rankings from The Sports Network Poll

The 1993 Mississippi Valley State Delta Devils football team represented Mississippi Valley State University as a member of the Southwestern Athletic Conference (SWAC) during the 1993 NCAA Division I-AA football season. Led by fourth-year head coach Larry Dorsey, the Delta Devils compiled an overall record of 4–4–2, with a conference record of 2–3–2, and finished sixth in the SWAC.

== Schedule ==
Date	Opponent	Site	Result	Attendance	Source
September 4	Arkansas–Pine Bluff*	Magnolia Stadium; Itta Bena, MS	W 20–6	4,500	
September 11	at Lane*	Rothrock Stadium; Jackson, TN	W 36–22		
September 25	at No. 21 Jackson State	Mississippi Veterans Memorial Stadium; Jackson, MS	T 7–7	37,000	
October 2	No. 21 Southern	Magnolia Stadium; Itta Bena, MS	L 13–14		
October 9	at Grambling State	Eddie G. Robinson Memorial Stadium; Grambling, LA	L 19–28	9,764	
October 16	UAB*	Magnolia Stadium; Itta Bena, MS	L 13–33	9,500	
October 30	at Prairie View A&M	Edward L. Blackshear Field; Prairie View, TX	W 42–6		
November 6	at No. 18 Alcorn State	Jack Spinks Stadium; Lorman, MS	L 20–28		
November 13	Alabama State	Magnolia Stadium; Itta Bena, MS	T 14–14		
November 20	Texas Southern	Magnolia Stadium; Itta Bena, MS	W 41–27		
*Non-conference game; Rankings from NCAA Division I-AA Football Committee Poll released prior to the game
