= 1991 Texas Southern Tigers football team =

American college football season

1991 Texas Southern Tigers football
- Conference: Southwestern Athletic Conference
- Record: 5–5–1 (3–3–1 SWAC)
- Head coach: Wally Highsmith (3rd season)
- Home stadium: Robertson Stadium; Rice Stadium

1991 Southwestern Athletic Conference football standings
| | Conf. | | | | | Overall |
| Team | W | | L | | T | W | | L | | T |
|---|---|---|---|---|---|---|---|---|---|---|
| No. 5 Alabama State $ | 6 | – | 0 | – | 1 | 11 | – | 0 | – | 1 |
| Alcorn State | 4 | – | 2 | – | 1 | 7 | – | 2 | – | 1 |
| Southern | 4 | – | 3 | – | 0 | 4 | – | 7 | – | 0 |
| Texas Southern | 3 | – | 3 | – | 1 | 5 | – | 5 | – | 1 |
| Mississippi Valley State | 3 | – | 3 | – | 1 | 7 | – | 3 | – | 1 |
| Jackson State | 3 | – | 4 | – | 0 | 5 | – | 5 | – | 0 |
| Grambling State | 3 | – | 4 | – | 0 | 5 | – | 6 | – | 0 |
| Prairie View A&M | 0 | – | 7 | – | 0 | 0 | – | 11 | – | 0 |
$ – Conference champion; Rankings from NCAA Division I-AA Football Committee poll

The 1991 Texas Southern Tigers football team represented Texas Southern University as a member of the Southwestern Athletic Conference (SWAC) during the 1991 NCAA Division I-AA football season. Led by third-year head coach Wally Highsmith, the Tigers compiled an overall record of 5–5–1, with a mark of 3–3–1 in conference play, and finished tied for fourth in the SWAC.

== Schedule ==
| Date | Opponent | Site | Result | Source |
|---|---|---|---|---|
| August 31 | Central State (OH)* | Robertson Stadium; Houston, TX | W 19–10 | |
| September 7 | Prairie View A&M | Rice Stadium; Houston, TX (Labor Day Classic) | W 23–6 | |
| September 14 | at No. 17 Sam Houston State* | Bowers Stadium; Huntsville, TX | L 6–37 | |
| September 21 | at Southern | A. W. Mumford Stadium; Baton Rouge, LA | L 30–38 | |
| September 28 | vs. Lane* | Public Schools Stadium; Galveston, TX (Galveston Beach Football Classic) | W 52–0 | |
| October 5 | No. 11 Alabama State | Robertson Stadium; Houston, TX | T 14–14 | |
| October 12 | Alcorn State | Robertson Stadium; Houston, TX | W 26–7 | |
| October 19 | vs. Southwest Texas State* | Alamo Stadium; San Antonio, TX | L 29–31 | |
| October 26 | at Mississippi Valley State | Magnolia Stadium; Itta Bena, MS | W 32–22 | |
| November 2 | at Grambling State | Eddie G. Robinson Memorial Stadium; Grambling, LA | L 27–30 | |
| November 9 | Jackson State | Robertson Stadium; Houston, TX | L 12–13 | |
*Non-conference game; Rankings from NCAA Division I-AA Football Committee Poll released prior to the game
