= 1991 Howard Bison football team =

American college football season

1991 Howard Bison football
- Conference: Mid-Eastern Athletic Conference
- Record: 2–9 (1–5 MEAC)
- Head coach: Steve Wilson (3rd season)
- Home stadium: William H. Greene Stadium

1991 Mid-Eastern Athletic Conference football standings
	Conf.					Overall
Team	W		L		T	W		L		T
Delaware State +	5	–	1	–	0	9	–	2	–	0
North Carolina A&T +	5	–	1	–	0	9	–	3	–	0
South Carolina State	3	–	3	–	0	7	–	4	–	0
Florida A&M	3	–	3	–	0	5	–	5	–	0
Bethune–Cookman	3	–	3	–	0	4	–	6	–	0
Howard	1	–	5	–	0	2	–	9	–	0
Morgan State	1	–	5	–	0	1	–	10	–	0
+ – Conference co-champions

The 1991 Howard Bison football team represented Howard University as a member of the Mid-Eastern Athletic Conference (MEAC) during the 1991 NCAA Division I-AA football season. Led by third-year head coach Steve Wilson, the Bison compiled an overall record of 2–9, with a conference record of 1–5, and finished tied for sixth in the MEAC.

== Schedule ==
Date	Opponent	Site	Result	Attendance	Source
September 7	Fayetteville State*	William H. Greene Stadium; Washington, DC	W 62–0		
September 14	Florida A&M	William H. Greene Stadium; Washington, DC	W 28–21	15,505	
September 21	South Carolina State	William H. Greene Stadium; Washington, DC	L 5–10		
September 28	at Temple*	Veterans Stadium; Philadelphia, PA	L 0–40	23,870	
October 5	vs. Alcorn State*	Hoosier Dome; Indianapolis, IN (Circle City Classic)	L 27–46	61,000	
October 12	at Bethune–Cookman	Municipal Stadium; Daytona Beach, FL	L 14–20 ^{2OT}	10,897	
October 26	at North Carolina A&T	Aggie Stadium; Greensboro, NC	L 9–26	24,495	
November 2	Central State (OH)*	William H. Greene Stadium; Washington, DC	L 16–49		
November 9	Towson State*	William H. Greene Stadium; Washington, DC	L 7–13	3,150	
November 16	at Morgan State	Hughes Stadium; Baltimore, MD (rivalry)	L 28–38	3,029	
November 23	at Delaware State	Alumni Stadium; Dover, DE	L 12–56		
*Non-conference game
