= 1991 North Carolina A&T Aggies football team =

American college football season

1991 North Carolina A&T Aggies football

MEAC co-champion
- Conference: Mid-Eastern Athletic Conference
- Record: 9–3 (5–1 MEAC)
- Head coach: Bill Hayes (4th season)
- Home stadium: Aggie Stadium

1991 Mid-Eastern Athletic Conference football standings
	Conf.					Overall
Team	W		L		T	W		L		T
Delaware State +	5	–	1	–	0	9	–	2	–	0
North Carolina A&T +	5	–	1	–	0	9	–	3	–	0
South Carolina State	3	–	3	–	0	7	–	4	–	0
Florida A&M	3	–	3	–	0	5	–	5	–	0
Bethune–Cookman	3	–	3	–	0	4	–	6	–	0
Howard	1	–	5	–	0	2	–	9	–	0
Morgan State	1	–	5	–	0	1	–	10	–	0
+ – Conference co-champions

The 1991 North Carolina A&T Aggies football team represented North Carolina A&T State University as a member of the Mid-Eastern Athletic Conference (MEAC) during the 1991 NCAA Division I-AA football season. Led by fourth-year head coach Bill Hayes, the Aggies compiled an overall record of 9–3, with a mark of 5–1 in conference play, and finished as MEAC co-champion.

== Schedule ==
Date	Opponent	Site	Result	Attendance	Source
August 31	at Morgan State	Hughes Stadium; Baltimore, MD	W 26–7	9,451	
September 7	North Carolina Central*	Aggie Stadium; Greensboro, NC (rivalry)	W 48–0	16,597	
September 14	at Winston-Salem State*	Bowman Gray Stadium; Winston-Salem, NC (rivalry)	L 10–13		
September 28	vs. Grambling State*	Cotton Bowl; Dallas, TX (State Fair Classic)	W 28–12	42,670	
October 5	Norfolk State*	Aggie Stadium; Greensboro, NC	W 50–14		
October 12	Florida A&M	Aggie Stadium; Greensboro, NC	W 41–19	9,961	
October 19	at East Tennessee State*	Memorial Center; Johnson City, TN	W 38–13		
October 26	Howard	Aggie Stadium; Greensboro, NC	W 26–9	24,495	
November 2	at Bethune–Cookman	Municipal Stadium; Daytona Beach, FL	W 39–24	6,800	
November 9	Delaware State	Aggie Stadium; Greensboro, NC	L 26–31	8,609	
November 23	at South Carolina State	Oliver C. Dawson Stadium; Orangeburg, SC (rivalry)	W 49–21	10,669	
December 21	vs. No. 5 Alabama State*	Joe Robbie Stadium; Miami Gardens, FL (Heritage Bowl)	L 13–36	7,724	
*Non-conference game; Rankings from NCAA Division I-AA Football Committee Poll released prior to the game
