= 1991 Morgan State Bears football team =

American college football season

1991 Morgan State Bears football
- Conference: Mid-Eastern Athletic Conference
- Record: 1–10 (1–5 MEAC)
- Head coach: Ricky Diggs (1st season)
- Home stadium: Hughes Stadium

1991 Mid-Eastern Athletic Conference football standings
	Conf.					Overall
Team	W		L		T	W		L		T
Delaware State +	5	–	1	–	0	9	–	2	–	0
North Carolina A&T +	5	–	1	–	0	9	–	3	–	0
South Carolina State	3	–	3	–	0	7	–	4	–	0
Florida A&M	3	–	3	–	0	5	–	5	–	0
Bethune–Cookman	3	–	3	–	0	4	–	6	–	0
Howard	1	–	5	–	0	2	–	9	–	0
Morgan State	1	–	5	–	0	1	–	10	–	0
+ – Conference co-champions

The 1991 Morgan State Bears football team represented Morgan State University as a member of the Mid-Eastern Athletic Conference (MEAC) during the 1991 NCAA Division I-AA football season. Led by first-year head coach Ricky Diggs, the Bears compiled an overall record of 1–10, with a mark of 1–5 in conference play, and finished tied for sixth in the MEAC.

== Schedule ==
Date	Opponent	Site	Result	Attendance	Source
August 31	North Carolina A&T	Hughes Stadium; Baltimore, MD	L 7–26	9,451	
September 7	at Norfolk State*	Foreman Field; Norfolk, VA	L 9–27	11,238	
September 14	at Bethune–Cookman	Municipal Stadium; Daytona Beach, FL	L 6–38	5,500	
September 21	at Youngstown State*	Stambaugh Stadium; Youngstown, OH	L 22–57	9,313	
October 5	at No. 9 Northern Iowa*	UNI-Dome; Cedar Falls, IA	L 6–56	13,368	
October 12	South Carolina State	Hughes Stadium; Baltimore, MD	L 6–21	7,231	
October 19	No. 20 (D-II) Virginia Union*	Hughes Stadium; Baltimore, MD	L 12–47	16,783	
October 26	at Delaware State	Alumni Stadium; Dover, DE	L 10–26	7,230	
November 2	at Florida A&M	Bragg Memorial Stadium; Tallahassee, FL	L 6–55	27,132	
November 9	No. 16 Western Illinois*	Hughes Stadium; Baltimore, MD	L 6–44	350	
November 16	Howard	Hughes Stadium; Baltimore, MD (rivalry)	W 38–28	3,029	
*Non-conference game; Rankings from NCAA Division I-AA Football Committee Poll released prior to the game
