= 1991 Mississippi Valley State Delta Devils football team =

American college football season

1991 Mississippi Valley State Delta Devils football
- Conference: Southwestern Athletic Conference
- Record: 7–3–1 (3–3–1 SWAC)
- Head coach: Larry Dorsey (2nd season)
- Home stadium: Magnolia Stadium

1991 Southwestern Athletic Conference football standings
	Conf.					Overall
Team	W		L		T	W		L		T
No. 5 Alabama State $	6	–	0	–	1	11	–	0	–	1
Alcorn State	4	–	2	–	1	7	–	2	–	1
Southern	4	–	3	–	0	4	–	7	–	0
Texas Southern	3	–	3	–	1	5	–	5	–	1
Mississippi Valley State	3	–	3	–	1	7	–	3	–	1
Jackson State	3	–	4	–	0	5	–	5	–	0
Grambling State	3	–	4	–	0	5	–	6	–	0
Prairie View A&M	0	–	7	–	0	0	–	11	–	0
$ – Conference champion; Rankings from NCAA Division I-AA Football Committee poll

The 1991 Mississippi Valley State Delta Devils football team represented Mississippi Valley State University as a member of the Southwestern Athletic Conference (SWAC) during the 1991 NCAA Division I-AA football season. Led by second-year head coach Larry Dorsey, the Delta Devils compiled an overall record of 7–3–1, with a conference record of 3–3–1, and finished tied for fourth in the SWAC.

== Schedule ==
Date	Opponent	Site	Result	Attendance	Source
August 31	vs. Tennessee State*	Liberty Bowl Memorial Stadium; Memphis, TN (Southern Heritage Classic)	W 10–7	25,891	
September 7	at Central Arkansas*	Estes Stadium; Conway, AR	W 35–3		
September 14	at Lane*	Rothrock Stadium; Jackson, TN	W 30–13		
September 21	Miles*	Magnolia Stadium; Itta Bena, MS	W 56–0		
September 29	at Jackson State	Mississippi Veterans Memorial Stadium; Jackson, MS	W 23–14	51,233	
October 5	Southern	Magnolia Stadium; Itta Bena, MS	W 7–0		
October 19	at Grambling State	Eddie G. Robinson Memorial Stadium; Grambling, LA	L 35–37		
October 26	Texas Southern	Magnolia Stadium; Itta Bena, MS	L 22–32		
November 2	at Prairie View A&M	Edward L. Blackshear Field; Prairie View, TX	W 41–0		
November 9	at Alcorn State	Henderson Stadium; Lorman, MS	T 28–28		
November 16	No. 5 Alabama State	Magnolia Stadium; Itta Bena, MS	L 20–48		
*Non-conference game; Rankings from NCAA Division I-AA Football Committee Poll released prior to the game
