= 1991 Bethune–Cookman Wildcats football team =

American college football season

1991 Bethune–Cookman Wildcats football
- Conference: Mid-Eastern Athletic Conference
- Record: 4–6 (3–3 MEAC)
- Head coach: Larry Little (9th season)
- Home stadium: Municipal Stadium

1991 Mid-Eastern Athletic Conference football standings
	Conf.					Overall
Team	W		L		T	W		L		T
Delaware State +	5	–	1	–	0	9	–	2	–	0
North Carolina A&T +	5	–	1	–	0	9	–	3	–	0
South Carolina State	3	–	3	–	0	7	–	4	–	0
Florida A&M	3	–	3	–	0	5	–	5	–	0
Bethune–Cookman	3	–	3	–	0	4	–	6	–	0
Howard	1	–	5	–	0	2	–	9	–	0
Morgan State	1	–	5	–	0	1	–	10	–	0
+ – Conference co-champions

The 1991 Bethune–Cookman Wildcats football team represented Bethune–Cookman College (now known as Bethune–Cookman University) as a member of the Mid-Eastern Athletic Conference (MEAC) during the 1991 NCAA Division I-AA football season. Led by ninth-year head coach Larry Little, the Wildcats compiled an overall record of 4–6, with a mark of 3–3 in conference play, and finished tied for third in the MEAC.

== Schedule ==
Date	Opponent	Site	Result	Attendance	Source
August 31	vs. Savannah State*	Gator Bowl; Jacksonville, FL (Gateway Classic)	L 20–35		
September 7	vs. Delaware State	Baynard Stadium; Wilmington, DE (Wilmington Classic)	L 28–20 (forfeit)	5,828	
September 14	Morgan State	Municipal Stadium; Daytona Beach, FL	W 38–6	5,500	
September 28	at UCF*	Florida Citrus Bowl; Orlando, FL	L 6–32	16,066	
October 12	Howard	Municipal Stadium; Daytona Beach, FL	W 20–14 ^{2OT}	10,897	
October 19	vs. South Carolina State	Lockhart Stadium; Fort Lauderdale, FL (South Florida Football Classic)	W 24–21 ^{OT}	9,500	
October 26	at Albany State*	Mills Stadium; Albany, GA	L 25–30		
November 2	North Carolina A&T	Municipal Stadium; Daytona Beach, FL	L 24–39	6,800	
November 16	vs. Morris Brown*	(The Bahamas) Thomas Robinson Stadium; Nassau, The Bahamas	W 51–13	12,500	
November 30	vs. Florida A&M	Tampa Stadium; Tampa, FL (Florida Classic)	L 28–46	40,249	
*Non-conference game
