= Greenville Public School District =

School district in Mississippi

Location
- Greenville, Mississippi United States

District information
- Grades: PreK–12
- Superintendent: Dr. Janice Monroe
- Schools: 15

Students and staff
- Students: 6718

Other information
- Website: www.gvillepublicschooldistrict.com

The Greenville Public School District (GPSD) or Greenville Public Schools (GPS) is a public school district based in Greenville, Mississippi (USA).

The district includes the majority of Greenville.

Adam Ganucheau and Kate Royals of Mississippi Today wrote in 2021 that the district was "one of the most under-resourced school districts" in the United States.

== Schools ==
High school:

- Greenville High School
  - It has/had two campuses: Greenville Campus and Weston Campus

Middle schools:

- Coleman Middle School
- TL Weston Middle School

Elementary schools:

- Matty Akin Elementary School
  - As of a year before 2017 it was the largest elementary school in the community.
- Julia L. Armstrong Elementary School
- Boyd Elementary School
- Carrie Stern Elementary School
- Trigg Elementary School
- Lucy L. Webb Elementary School
  - It includes the Lucy Webb Kindergarten Preparatory School, the district's first area that only houses kindergarten classes.
- Weddington Elementary School

Preschools:

- McBride Pre-K Academy

Other campuses:

- Greenville Technical Center

Former schools:

- Solomon Middle School
- Fulwiler Elementary School
- Manning Elementary School
- McBride Elementary School

== Demographics ==
=== 2006–07 school year ===
There were a total of 7,001 students enrolled in the Greenville Public School District during the 2006–2007 school year. The gender makeup of the district was 50% female and 50% male. The racial makeup of the district was 97.30% African American, 2.44% White, 0.14% Hispanic, and 0.11% Asian. 97.1% of the district's students were eligible to receive free lunch.

=== Previous school years ===
School year	Enrollment	Gender makeup		Racial makeup				
School year	Enrollment	Female	Male	Asian	African American	Hispanic	Native American	White
2005-06	7,288	50%	50%	0.11%	96.98%	0.12%	–	2.79%
2004-05	7,277	49%	51%	0.08%	96.39%	0.14%	0.01%	3.38%
2003-04	7,383	49%	51%	0.12%	96.10%	0.11%	0.01%	3.66%
2002-03	7,401	50%	50%	0.16%	96.10%	0.12%	–	3.62%

== Accountability statistics ==
	2006-07	2005-06	2004-05	2003-04	2002-03
District Accreditation Status	Accredited	Accredited	Accredited	Accredited	Accredited
School Performance Classifications
Level 5 (Superior Performing) Schools	1	2	0	1	0
Level 4 (Exemplary) Schools	1	3	1	2	2
Level 3 (Successful) Schools	12	9	11	11	7
Level 2 (Under Performing) Schools	0	0	2	0	5
Level 1 (Low Performing) Schools	0	0	0	0	0
Not Assigned	0	0	0	0	0

== See also ==
- List of school districts in Mississippi
