= Greenville High School (Mississippi) =

High school in Mississippi, United States

Location
- 419 East Robertshaw Street; Greenville, (Washington County), Mississippi 38701; United States; 33.3932°N 91.0471°W

Information
- Type: Public high school
- Principal: Barren Cleark
- Staff: 47.90 (FTE)
- Enrollment: 811 (2023-2024)
- Student to teacher ratio: 16.93
- Colors: Black and gold
- Nickname: Hornets
- Website: https://highgreenvillems.schoolinsites.com/

Greenville High School, also known as Greenville Weston High School, is a public high school in Greenville, Mississippi, United States. It is a part of the Greenville Public School District.

The district includes the majority of Greenville.

== History ==
In 2013, a $5 million construction project was begun to renovate the school's gymnasium and build 14 new classrooms.

== Demographics ==
African Americans make up 99 percent of its 1,697 students. During the 2011–12 school year, 85 percent of students qualified for government-paid free lunch; another two percent qualified for government lunch subsidies, making Greenville Weston the state's school with the most students on lunch assistance.

== Academics ==
Greenville Weston High School received failing grades from state examiners for the three years ending in 2013, making the school eligible for takeover by the state under a 2010 law. A takeover could involve the replacement of the entire faculty with new hires, but it is considered unlikely in the near future because Mississippi acknowledges that there are more schools eligible for takeover than it could manage at one time.

== Extracurricular activities ==
Greenville Weston has a marching band. Its athletic teams are nicknamed the Hornets and the Lady Bees for girls' sports.

== Notable alumni ==
- Shelby Foote, writer
- Cleo Montgomery, former NFL player
- Walker Percy, writer
- Charles Sallis, historian
- Derrick Simmons, politician
