= Southern Jaguars football =

College football organization

2026 Southern Jaguars football team
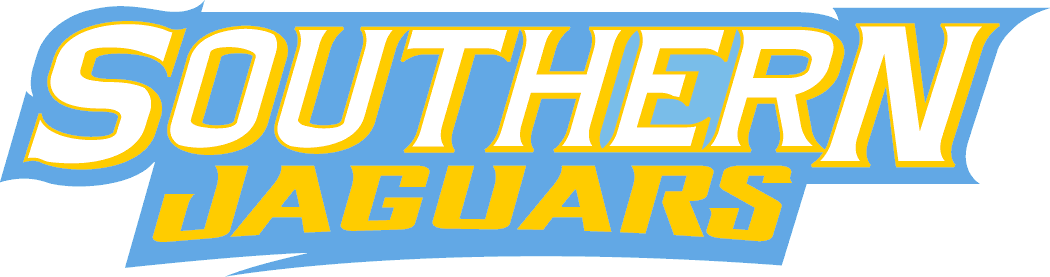
- First season: 1916; 110 years ago
- Athletic director: Roman Banks
- Head coach: Marshall Faulk; 1st season, 2–4 (.333)
- Location: Baton Rouge, Louisiana
- Stadium: A. W. Mumford Stadium (capacity: 29,000)
- Conference: SWAC
- Division: West
- Colors: Columbia blue and gold
- All-time record: 562–349–28 (.613)
- Bowl record: 8–3 (.727)

Black college national championships
- 1948, 1949, 1950, 1954, 1960, 1993, 1995, 1997, 2003

Conference championships
- SWAC: 1938, 1940, 1946, 1947, 1948, 1949, 1950, 1955, 1959, 1960, 1966, 1975, 1993, 1997, 1998, 1999, 2003, 2013

Division championships
- SWAC West: 2000, 2003, 2004, 2013, 2014, 2018, 2019, 2022, 2024
- Rivalries: Grambling State (rivalry); Jackson State (rivalry); Texas Southern
- Marching band: Human Jukebox
- Website: gojagsports.com

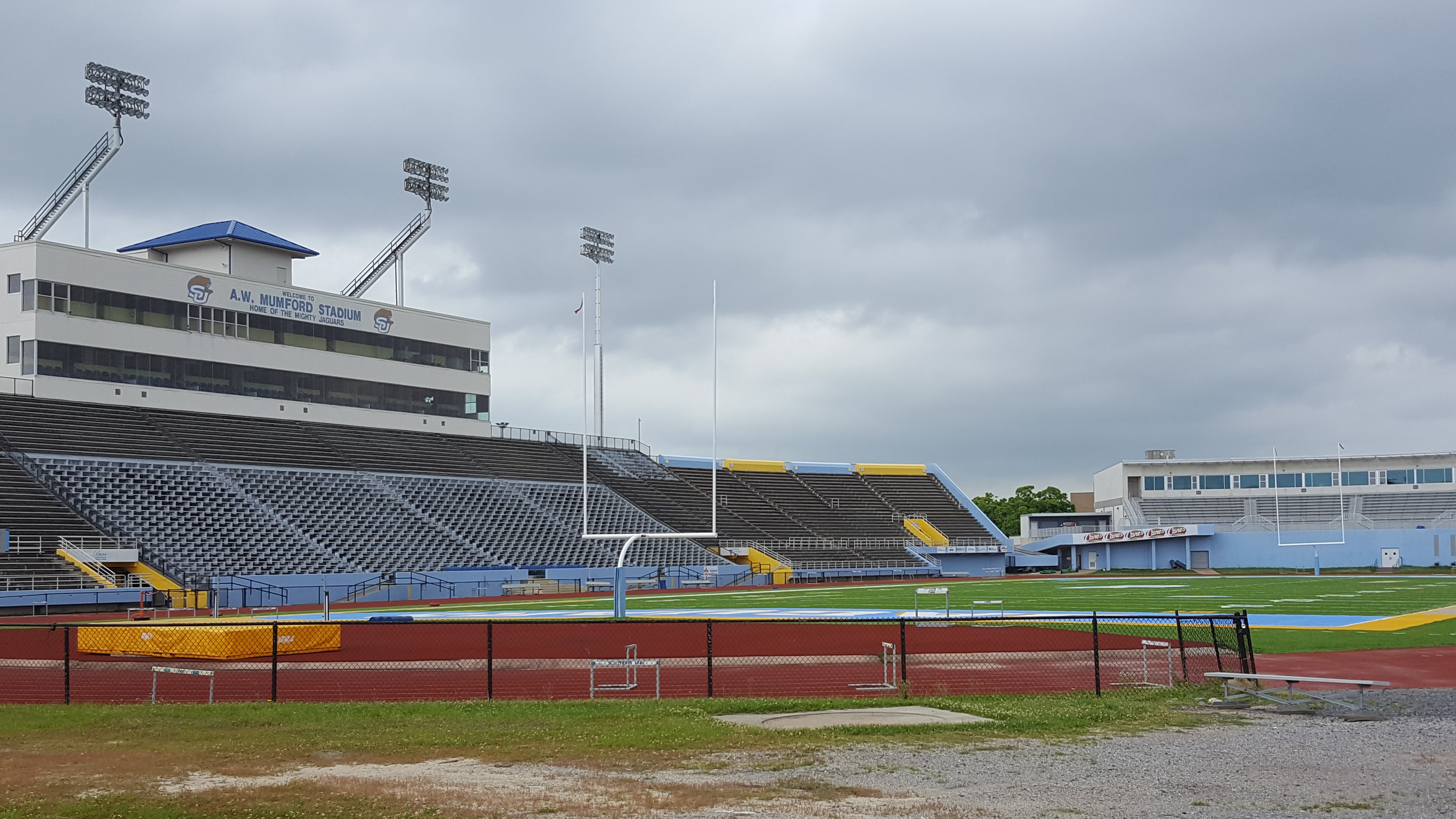
A. W. Mumford Stadium

The Southern Jaguars are the college football team representing Southern University. The Jaguars play at the NCAA Division I Football Championship Subdivision (FCS) as a member of the Southwestern Athletic Conference (SWAC). The Jaguars started collegiate football in 1916, and played in the Gulf Coast Athletic Association before joining the SWAC in 1934.

Every late November they play their last regular season game against in-state rival Grambling in the Bayou Classic in New Orleans, Louisiana. Another notable football rivalry, dubbed the "BoomBox Classic", is played against Jackson State yearly.

== History ==
=== Classifications ===
- 1962–1972: NCAA College Division
- 1973–1976: NCAA Division II
- 1977: NCAA Division I
- 1978–present: NCAA Division I-AA/FCS

=== Conference memberships ===
- 1916–?: Independent
- ?–1933: Gulf Coast Athletic Association
- 1934–present: Southwestern Athletic Conference

== Championships ==
=== Black college football national championships ===
Year	Coach	National championship selectors	Record
1948	Ace Mumford	Associated Negro Press, Baltimore Afro-American, Pittsburgh Courier	12–0
1949	Ace Mumford	Associated Negro Press, Pittsburgh Courier	10–0–1
1950	Ace Mumford	Associated Negro Press, Pittsburgh Courier	10–0–1
1954	Ace Mumford	Atlanta Daily World, Pittsburgh Courier	10–1
1960	Ace Mumford	Atlanta Daily World, Associated Negro Press, Pittsburgh Courier	9–1
1993	Pete Richardson	American Sports Wire, Black College Sports Report	11–1
1995	Pete Richardson	Atlanta Daily World, American Sports Wire, American Urban Radio Networks	11–1
1997	Pete Richardson	Atlanta Daily World, American Sports Wire	11–1
2003	Pete Richardson	Atlanta Daily World, American Sports Wire, American Urban Radio Networks, Black College Sports Page, Dr. Cavil's Classic Cuts–Major Division Poll	12–1

=== Conference championships ===
Southern has won 19 conference championships, with all of them coming in the Southwestern Athletic Conference, 12 outright and 7 shared.

Season	Conference	Coach	Overall record	Conference record
1938†	Southwestern Athletic Conference	Ace Mumford	7–1–1	4–1–1
1940†	Southwestern Athletic Conference	Ace Mumford	8–1	5–1
1946	Southwestern Athletic Conference	Ace Mumford	9–2–1	5–1
1947	Southwestern Athletic Conference	Ace Mumford	10–2	7–0
1948	Southwestern Athletic Conference	Ace Mumford	12–0	7–0
1949†	Southwestern Athletic Conference	Ace Mumford	10–0–1	6–0–1
1950	Southwestern Athletic Conference	Ace Mumford	10–0–1	7–0
1955	Southwestern Athletic Conference	Ace Mumford	7–2–1	6–1
1959	Southwestern Athletic Conference	Ace Mumford	8–2	7–0
1960†	Southwestern Athletic Conference	Ace Mumford	9–1	6–1
1966†	Southwestern Athletic Conference	Robert E. Smith	7–2–1	5–1–1
1975†	Southwestern Athletic Conference	Charles Bates	9–3	4–2
1993	Southwestern Athletic Conference	Pete Richardson	11–1	7–0
1997	Southwestern Athletic Conference	Pete Richardson	11–1	6–1
1998	Southwestern Athletic Conference	Pete Richardson	11–1	8–0
1999	Southwestern Athletic Conference	Pete Richardson	11–2	4–0
2003	Southwestern Athletic Conference	Pete Richardson	12–1	6–1
2013	Southwestern Athletic Conference	Dawson Odums	9–4	7–2
Conference Championships:			19	

† Co-champions

=== Division championships ===
Year	Division	Coach	Opponent	CG result
2000	SWAC West	Pete Richardson	Jackson State	W 31–30
2003†	SWAC West	Pete Richardson	Alabama State	W 20–9
2004	SWAC West	Pete Richardson	Alabama State	L 35–40
2013	SWAC West	Dawson Odums	Jackson State	W 34–27
2014	SWAC West	Dawson Odums	Alcorn State	L 24–38
2018	SWAC West	Dawson Odums	Alcorn State	L 28–37
2019	SWAC West	Dawson Odums	Alcorn State	L 24–39
2022†	SWAC West	Eric Dooley	Jackson State	L 24–43
2024	SWAC West	Terrence Graves	Jackson State	L 13–41
Division Championships			9	

† Co-champions

== Postseason ==
Southern has appeared in eleven bowl games. The Jaguars have a record of 8–3.

Date	Bowl	Opponent	Result	Source
January 1, 1942	Flower	North Carolina A&T	L 12–14	
December 25, 1946	Yam	Tuskegee	W 64–7	
December 25, 1947	Yam	Fort Valley State	W 46–0	
December 5, 1948	Fruit Bowl	San Francisco State	W 30–0	
December 27, 1975	Pelican Bowl	South Carolina State	W 15–12	
January 1, 1994	Heritage Bowl	South Carolina State	W 11–0	
December 29, 1995	Heritage Bowl	Florida A&M	W 30–25	
December 31, 1996	Heritage Bowl	Howard	L 24–27	
December 27, 1997	Heritage Bowl	South Carolina State	W 34–28	
December 26, 1998	Heritage Bowl	Bethune–Cookman	W 28–2	
December 18, 1999	Heritage Bowl	Hampton	L 3–24	

== College Football Hall of Fame members ==
- Marino Casem (head coach; 1987–1988, 1992)
- Ace Mumford (head coach; 1936–1961)

== Alumni in the NFL ==
Southern has three alumni that has been elected to the Pro Football Hall of Fame.

- Mel Blount, Class of 1989
- Aeneas Williams, Class of 2014
- Harold Carmichael, Class of 2020

Over 70 Southern alumni have played in the NFL, including:

- RaShaun Allen
- Perry Brooks
- Matthew Dorsett
- Jubilee Dunbar
- George Farmer
- Alvin Haymond
- Maurice Hurst
- Rich Jackson
- Ray Jones
- Tyrone Jones
- Gerald Perry
- Rufus Porter
- Isiah Robertson
- Godwin Turk
- Ralph Williams
- Gillis Wilson
- Jerry Wilson
- Danny Johnson
- Kendel Shello

== Future non-conference opponents ==
Announced schedules as of July 17, 2026

2026	2027	2028
vs Alabama State; Birmingham, AL	at Nicholls	at LSU
Kentucky State		
at Houston		
Louisiana Christian		

== See also ==
- List of black college football classics
- List of NCAA Division I FCS football programs
