= Jackson State–Southern football rivalry =

American college band rivalry

BoomBox Classic
- Jackson State Southern
- Sport: American football
- First meeting: November 1, 1929 (97–0, Southern)
- Latest meeting: September 26, 2026 (35–17, Jackson State)
- Next meeting: 2027

Statistics
- Total meetings: 74
- All-time series: 37–35, Jackson State (not including 2 vacated wins by Southern)
- Largest victory: 98–0, Southern (1929); 41–0, Jackson State (1981)
- Longest win streak: 8, Jackson State (2021–Present); 8, Southern (2013–2021)
- Current win streak: 8, Jackson State (2021–Present)

Locations of Jackson State and Southern University

The Jackson State–Southern football rivalry, often informally called the BoomBox Classic, is a college football rivalry between the Tigers of Jackson State University (JSU) and the Jaguars of Southern University (SU). An annual conference game between two historically black universities in the Southwestern Athletic Conference (SWAC), its location usually rotates between JSU's Mississippi Veterans Memorial Stadium in Jackson, Mississippi and SU's A. W. Mumford Stadium in Baton Rouge, Louisiana, but it has also been held at larger venues to accommodate the large crowds that the game draws. Through 2026, the all-time series is tied on the field, 37–37; however, 2 of those wins by Southern were vacated.

== Background ==
The teams first met on Friday, November 1, 1929, in Jackson—a 97–0 win by Southern. After that game, the series was not resumed again until 1958, when Jackson State joined the SWAC. Since then, the conference rivals have played each other every single season—including twice in the same season on four separate occasions, because of appearances in the SWAC Championship Game. In fact, both schools are among the most successful SWAC members. Through 2025, Jackson State and Southern have won 19 and 18 SWAC football titles respectively, the second and third most in the conference.

== Past venues and atmosphere ==
Both JSU and SU are known to have finished among the top ten NCAA Division I Football Championship Subdivision schools in past annual home attendance figures. Due to the game's substantial crowds, it has sometimes been played at alternative venues to accommodate the numbers. In fact, over the years, it has often been played in a "classic" style of game. In 1961 it was played in Mobile, Alabama as the second annual "Claver Classic." It was played in Baton Rouge's Memorial Stadium in 1978, since it could hold upwards of 25,000 fans, while Southern's stadium could only hold 13,000 at the time. It was played in New Orleans in 2000, 2002, and 2004—the latter game as the third annual "Big Easy Classic" series. In 2009, Southern voluntarily surrendered a home game to keep it at JSU’s home stadium to take advantage of the larger capacity. The 2012 game was played as the fifth annual "W. C. Gorden Classic" series. The 2023 game was played as the sixth annual "Pete Richardson Classic." However, with JSU's current win streak in the series, the Jackson Clarion Ledger newspaper declared the game as "[n]ot a rivalry anymore."

The intense rivalry extends beyond the game itself, featuring a battle between the schools' well-respected and popular marching bands, Jackson State's "Sonic Boom of the South" and Southern's "Human Jukebox." Hence, in the past, the game had been commonly referred to informally by using a portmanteau of the bands' names—the BoomBox Classic. The BoomBox battle traditionally starts about an hour before the game begins and continues for about an hour after the game has been decided, known as the "Zero Quarter" and "Fifth Quarter" respectively in the HBCU community.

== Recent national attention ==
JSU's hiring of Deion Sanders as head coach in 2020 drew a great deal of attention to the Tiger program in general and the JSU-SU series in particular. On October 23, 2022, ESPN's College GameDay program announced that it would broadcast live from Mississippi Veterans Memorial Stadium on the morning of the game. GameDay had previously made appearances at only three other HBCU games: the 2005 Grambling State–Southern game at the Bayou Classic in Houston, the 2008 Florida A&M–Hampton game in Tallahassee, Florida, and the 2021 Alcorn State–North Carolina Central game at the MEAC/SWAC Challenge in Atlanta.

== Game results ==
Jackson State victories	Southern victories	Tie games	Vacated games

No.	Date	Location	Winner	Score
1	November 1, 1929	Jackson	Southern	97–0
2	October 25, 1958	Scotlandville	Southern	30–6
3	October 24, 1959	Jackson	Southern	22–6
4	October 22, 1960	Scotlandville	Southern	41–0
5	October 21, 1961	Mobile, Alabama^{*}	Southern	17–7
6	October 20, 1962	Scotlandville	Southern	19–14
7	October 19, 1963	Jackson	Southern	17–16
8	October 17, 1964	Scotlandville	Jackson College	9–0
9	October 16, 1965	Jackson	Southern	24–21
10	October 15, 1966	Scotlandville	Southern	9–0
11	October 14, 1967	Jackson	Jackson State	3–0
12	October 19, 1968	Scotlandville	Southern	30–16
13	October 18, 1969	Jackson	Southern	47–21
14	October 17, 1970	Scotlandville	Southern	27–14
15	October 16, 1971	Jackson	Jackson State	49–28
16	October 14, 1972	Scotlandville	Jackson State	22–17
17	October 13, 1973	Jackson	Jackson State	28–3
18	October 19, 1974	Scotlandville	Southern	21–19
19	October 18, 1975	Jackson	Southern	21–20
20	October 16, 1976	Scotlandville	Southern	20–6
21	October 15, 1977	Jackson	Jackson State	38–0
22	October 14, 1978	Baton Rouge	Jackson State	41–14
23	October 13, 1979	Jackson	Jackson State	34–0
24	October 18, 1980	Scotlandville	Jackson State	7–6
25	October 17, 1981	Jackson	Jackson State	41–0
26	October 16, 1982	Baton Rouge	Jackson State	17–10
27	October 15, 1983	Jackson	Jackson State	31–0
28	October 13, 1984	Baton Rouge	Southern	34–28
29	October 19, 1985	Jackson	Jackson State	27–9
30	October 18, 1986	Baton Rouge	Jackson State	16–9
31	October 17, 1987	Jackson	Jackson State	14–0
32	October 15, 1988	Baton Rouge	Jackson State	23–3
33	October 14, 1989	Jackson	Southern	21–7
34	October 13, 1990	Baton Rouge	Jackson State	52–14
35	October 19, 1991	Jackson	Southern	21–20
36	October 17, 1992	Baton Rouge	Jackson State	25–24
37	October 16, 1993	Jackson	Southern	16–3
38	October 15, 1994	Baton Rouge	Jackson State	24–21

No.	Date	Location	Winner	Score
39	October 14, 1995	Jackson	Jackson State	16–14
40	October 19, 1996	Baton Rouge	Southern	27–16
41	October 18, 1997	Jackson	Southern	28–8
42	October 17, 1998	Baton Rouge	Southern	33–28
43	October 16, 1999	Jackson	Southern	26–14
44	December 11, 1999	Birmingham, Alabama^{**}	Southern	31–30
45	September 23, 2000	New Orleans	Jackson State	13–10
46	October 13, 2001	Jackson	Jackson State	24–21
47	September 21, 2002	New Orleans	Jackson State	36–13
48	October 18, 2003	Jackson	Southern	30–20
49	October 16, 2004	New Orleans^{†}	Southern	45–7
50	October 15, 2005	Baton Rouge	Southern	20–14
51	October 14, 2006	Jackson	Jackson State	31–28
52	October 13, 2007	Baton Rouge	Jackson State	32–26
53	October 4, 2008	Jackson	Southern	35–28
54	October 3, 2009	Jackson	Jackson State	22–14
55	October 16, 2010	Jackson	Jackson State	49–45
56	October 17, 2011	Baton Rouge	Jackson State	28–24
57	September 22, 2012	Jackson^{‡}	Southern	28–21
58	September 28, 2013	Baton Rouge	Jackson State	19–14
59	December 7, 2013	Houston^{**}	Southern	34–27
60	October 25, 2014	Jackson	Southern	42–28
61	September 19, 2015	Baton Rouge	Southern	50–31
62	October 15, 2016	Jackson	Southern	28–24
63	October 22, 2017	Jackson	Southern	35–17
64	October 27, 2018	Baton Rouge	Southern	41–7
65	November 16, 2019	Jackson	Southern	40–34
66	April 3, 2021	Jackson	Southern	34–14
67	November 13, 2021	Baton Rouge	Jackson State	21–17
68	October 29, 2022	Jackson	Jackson State	35–0
69	December 3, 2022	Jackson^{**}	Jackson State	43–24
70	September 9, 2023	Baton Rouge^{§}	Jackson State	27–14
71	September 14, 2024	Jackson	Jackson State	33–15
72	December 7, 2024	Jackson^{**}	Jackson State	41–13
73	September 27, 2025	Baton Rouge	Jackson State	38–13
74	September 26, 2026	Jackson	Jackson State	35–17
Series: Jackson State leads 37–35
* Claver Classic ** SWAC Championship Game † Big Easy Classic ‡ W. C. Gorden Classic § Pete Richardson Classic

== See also ==
- List of NCAA college football rivalry games
- List of black college football classics
