= Heritage Bowl =

Heritage Bowl (defunct)
- Stadium: Georgia Dome
- Location: Atlanta
- Previous stadiums: Joe Robbie Stadium (1991); Bragg Memorial Stadium (1993)
- Previous locations: Miami Gardens, Florida (1991); Tallahassee, Florida (1993)
- Operated: 1991–1999
- Conference tie-ins: Mid-Eastern Athletic Conference; Southwestern Athletic Conference

Sponsors
- Alamo (1991); Jim Walter Homes (1995); McDonald's (1996–1999)

The Heritage Bowl was an NCAA Division I Football Championship Subdivision (FCS) bowl game held by the National Collegiate Athletic Association. The bowl pitted a team from the Mid-Eastern Athletic Conference (MEAC) against a team from the Southwestern Athletic Conference (SWAC). It was hoped that it would become a true national championship game for historically black colleges and universities (HBCUs). It was a successor to the Pelican Bowl, which matched MEAC and SWAC teams during the 1970s, and a predecessor to the Celebration Bowl of the 2010s.

== History ==
The bowl's legitimacy as an HBCU championship game was called into question immediately, starting with its very first contest, when its committee awarded its automatic bid to the MEAC's second-seeded co-champion, North Carolina A&T, over its top seed, Delaware State (Delaware State had defeated the Aggies head-to-head, on the road even, but their conference victory over Bethune–Cookman was viewed differently as it had been determined by a forfeit). That first game brought other challenges as well, as it also drew only 7,728 spectators and lost future support from its title sponsor, Alamo, in the process. "That left the organizers $1 million in debt and blaming each other for the bowl's problems. President James McKinley, ousted in January, sued Alamo and his board of directors to win back his now largely meaningless post." The bowl also still owed its participating schools money months after the game.

Heritage Bowl II did not fair all that much better, as it was played without a title sponsor and featured neither the MEAC champion nor the SWAC champion. Even after moving to a January date and having Florida A&M serve as a de facto home team, the game still could only attract 11,273 fans—albeit an improvement over the previous game. In subsequent years half of the conferences' top seeds declined the automatic bowl bid in order to participate in the NCAA Division I–AA playoffs instead. This became an especially common issue for the MEAC, often leaving its runner-up—or even its third seed, for the final three Heritage Bowls—to represent the conference.

The bowl peaked in the mid-1990s as it found a new stable home (Atlanta's Georgia Dome) and a new title sponsor (Jim Walter Homes), all while attendance sharply increased—and the December 30, 1994, game finally got to pair the top-seeded champions from both leagues. This renaissance was short-lived, however, with attendance leveling off as the game evolved into an annual contest between Southern and the MEAC's third seed. Because of the MEAC's unwillingness to guarantee that its champion would participate, the television contract was ended and eventually the game was too, even though its later attendance figures surpassed some higher-division bowl games. Perhaps not coincidentally, the SWAC—which usually did send its champion, because several of its schools played Thanksgiving weekend regular season games that conflicted with the first round of the playoffs—won most of the Heritage Bowls that were held.

The bowl was played in Miami Gardens, Florida, in 1991, Tallahassee, Florida, in 1993, and Atlanta from 1994 to 1999.

== Legacy ==
The game after the 1994 season was the only one to feature both conferences' top seeds; the games after the 1992 and 1996 seasons did not include either league's top seed.

Unlike the Pelican Bowl, which continued to insist that it was an HBCU championship game even after one of the conferences' top seeds had declined their automatic bid, the Heritage Bowl's committee essentially had to concede that its second game could not be promoted as an HBCU championship—since not only one but both conferences' champions had backed out. This largely set the tone for the remainder of the bowl's existence, save for the 1994 game. Indeed, playing in the bowl may have actually been viewed as more of a hindrance to earning an HBCU title than by avoiding the game; five teams that declined their Heritage Bowl bids were eventually able to secure black national titles from various selectors any way, without having to determine it head-to-head in the bowl game.

Several Heritage Bowls were in position to have had a major impact on the black national championship selection process. Had Howard not declined its automatic bid to play Southern after the 1993 campaign, for example, it would have likely prevented the HBCU national title from being split between the two schools by selectors. Likewise, in 1996 SWAC top seed Jackson State opted to forgo the bowl for the playoffs, missing an opportunity to avoid a split black national title with Howard by settling it on the field. In both 1997 and 1998 the MEAC's top seed, Hampton, refused its invitations to play Southern, likely leading to split titles both years. After Hampton declined the 1998 bid, the MEAC's second seed (Florida A&M) did as well; both FAMU and Southern subsequently ended up being declared HBCU champions by various selectors.

In 2010 a replacement for the Heritage Bowl, the "Legacy Bowl"—not to be confused with a later exhibition game of the same name—was proposed for the 2011 season, but MEAC officials voted it down. In 2015 the two conferences finally reached an agreement to compete in the new Celebration Bowl.

== Game results ==
Game	Date	SWAC representative		MEAC representative		Venue	Attendance	Reference
Alamo Heritage Bowl I	December 21, 1991	Alabama State*	36	North Carolina A&T	13	Joe Robbie Stadium (Miami Gardens, Florida)	7,728	
Heritage Bowl II	January 2, 1993	Grambling State	45	Florida A&M	15	Bragg Memorial Stadium (Tallahassee, Florida)	11,273	
Heritage Bowl III	January 1, 1994	Southern*	11	South Carolina State	0	Georgia Dome (Atlanta, Georgia)	36,128	
Heritage Bowl IV	December 30, 1994	Grambling State*	27	South Carolina State*	31	Georgia Dome (Atlanta, Georgia)	22,179	
Jim Walter Homes Heritage Bowl V	December 29, 1995	Southern	30	Florida A&M*	25	Georgia Dome (Atlanta, Georgia)	25,164	
McDonald's Heritage Bowl VI	December 31, 1996	Southern	24	Howard	27	Georgia Dome (Atlanta, Georgia)	18,126	
McDonald's Heritage Bowl VII	December 27, 1997	Southern*	34	South Carolina State	28	Georgia Dome (Atlanta, Georgia)	32,629	
McDonald's Heritage Bowl VIII	December 26, 1998	Southern*	28	Bethune–Cookman	2	Georgia Dome (Atlanta, Georgia)	32,955	
McDonald's Heritage Bowl IX	December 18, 1999	Southern*	3	Hampton	24	Georgia Dome (Atlanta, Georgia)	29,561	

Note: an asterisk denotes when the conference's outright champion or top-seeded co-champion accepted its automatic bid to the bowl (in 1991 the bowl's committee issued the MEAC's bid to its second-seeded co-champion)
