= Bayou Classic =

American college football rivalry

- Grambling State Tigers Southern Jaguars
- Sport: American football
- First meeting: Overall series: Southern, 20–0 (November 11, 1932); Bayou Classic: Grambling, 21–0 (November 23, 1974)
- Latest meeting: November 29, 2025; Southern, 28–27
- Next meeting: November 28, 2026
- Stadiums: Caesars Superdome (1975–2004, 2006–2019, 2021–Present); Independence Stadium (2020); Reliant Stadium (2005); Tulane Stadium (1974)
- Trophy: Bayou Classic trophy

Statistics
- Total meetings: Overall series: 77; Bayou Classic: 52
- All-time series: Overall series: Southern, 43–34; Bayou Classic: Southern, 27–24 (includes 1 unplayed game forfeited by SU, but does not include 2 wins vacated by SU or 1 win vacated by GSU)
- Largest victory: Overall series: Southern, 64–6 (1935); Bayou Classic: Southern, 49–7 (2021)
- Longest win streak: Overall series: Grambling State, 9 (1970–1978; includes 1 unplayed game forfeited by SU); Bayou Classic: Southern, 8 (1993–2000)
- Current win streak: Southern, 4 (2022–Present)

Locations of Grambling State and Southern University

The Bayou Classic is an annual college football classic rivalry game between the Grambling State University Tigers and the Southern University Jaguars, first held under that name in 1974 at Tulane Stadium in New Orleans, although the series itself actually began in 1932. A trophy is awarded to the winning school.

== Background ==
Since 1974 the game has been held the Saturday after Thanksgiving Day, at the Superdome. Following the devastation of Hurricane Katrina, organizers moved the 2005 event from the Superdome to Reliant Stadium in Houston, Texas, where many of New Orleans' evacuees were living. This was the only time that the Bayou Classic was held outside of Louisiana. The 2006 Bayou Classic returned to the Superdome.

It is the best known annual game and rivalry in historically black college or university (HBCU) football and was nationally televised in the U.S. by NBC from 1991 to 2014. Beginning in 2015, it aired on the NBC Sports Network (NBCSN); after NBCSN shut down at the end of 2021, the Bayou Classic returned to NBC. The Bayou Classic was the only National Collegiate Athletic Association Division I Football Championship Subdivision game to be shown regularly on broadcast television. Fans have been known to refer to it as the "Black Super Bowl", although that name is not used in any official capacity by either school due to the National Football League's restrictions on the use of the "Super Bowl" name. Both schools typically forgo FCS playoff eligibility to participate in the Bayou Classic. The game is one of two black college football classics to be associated with Thanksgiving weekend (the other is the older Turkey Day Classic).

The game had State Farm Insurance as its title sponsor from 1996 to 2011.

== Other activities ==
Of the many activities held in conjunction with the game, the most anticipated and well-attended is the two-part Battle of the Bands, where both universities' marching bands—Grambling's "World Famed" Tiger Marching Band and Southern's Human Jukebox—perform. Following the Greek show, the two renowned bands stage elaborately choreographed performances on the Friday night before the game. The final part is held during the football game's halftime show. There is no official judge for the band battle.

Since 1992, members of Grambling's Army ROTC, Southern's Army ROTC, and the Navy ROTC run with the game ball from Southern's campus in the Scotlandville area of Baton Rouge to the Caesars Superdome in the New Orleans Central Business District for the annual "Bayou Classic Motivation Run." The event happens the day before the game begins and is an approximately 100 mile run that takes between seven and ten hours to complete. ROTC members take turns running with the ball while a police escort trails them along the way.

Other activities usually include a press conference, black business showcase, golf tournament, coaches luncheon, a concert/fan festival, tailgating, fashion show, pep rally, alumni functions, a Louisiana high school battle of the bands, college recruitment fair, a Bayou Classic Parade, and a job fair for graduating students of both institutions. An annual Grambling vs. Southern "Miss Bayou Classic" beauty pageant was also held from 1976 to 2002.

== Financial impact ==
The Bayou Classic is a major source of revenue ($50 million) to the city of New Orleans and the state of Louisiana. 250,000 visitors descend upon New Orleans over the course of the events leading up to the game, and the national television audience has attracted between four and five million viewers. The success of the game has inspired the promotion of numerous other HBCU classics. Historically, the stadium attendance had averaged between 50,000 and 70,000 annually which makes it one of the highest attended Division I FCS matchups every season. Hurricane Katrina brought some challenges, first with a one-year move to Houston, then with a slight drop-off in attendance upon the classic's return to New Orleans—all while the Florida Classic and Magic City Classic gained significantly in prominence over that same time period. Though the Bayou Classic also lost its title sponsor in 2011 and GSU faced numerous issues during its 2013 season, officials in 2014 rejected suggestions to remove GSU as a participant and instead resolved to quickly rejuvenate the classic. Attendance has now climbed significantly each year since 2011 and is again near pre-Katrina levels. The game also remains nationally televised, although NBC did briefly move the game broadcast over to its old sister sports-only network between the years of 2015 and 2021.

== Series history ==
Historically, Grambling State and Southern have arguably had the two most successful football teams in the Southwestern Athletic Conference. Through the 2021 season, Grambling has more SWAC football titles than any other school (25, not including their vacated 1975 title); Southern has the second most with 18. GSU and SU also have more black national titles than any other SWAC schools; as of 2021, Grambling has the second most in the entire country with 15 total, while SU has the fourth most at the FCS-level (11). The two schools also represented the SWAC in 11 of the 12 Pelican and Heritage bowls, as well as in multiple Celebration Bowls. Through 2015 Florida A&M, formerly of the Mid-Eastern Athletic Conference, was the only FCS-level HBCU school with more football wins (588) than Southern (578) or Grambling (565). However, Florida A&M, Southern, and Grambling were ordered by the NCAA to vacate wins in multiple sports due to the questionable eligibility of hundreds of their student athletes in the 2010s. It is not immediately clear just which football games are effected by these rulings, but the NCAA did make a special point to specify that Grambling's 2011 season record and championships remain fully intact; games played between 2012 and 2015, however, appear to remain possible candidates for being vacated (the 2015 Bayou Classic was one that was apparently vacated). Southern, meanwhile, had to vacate all of its 2013 and 2014 wins, at the very least (which also includes 2 Bayou Classic wins).

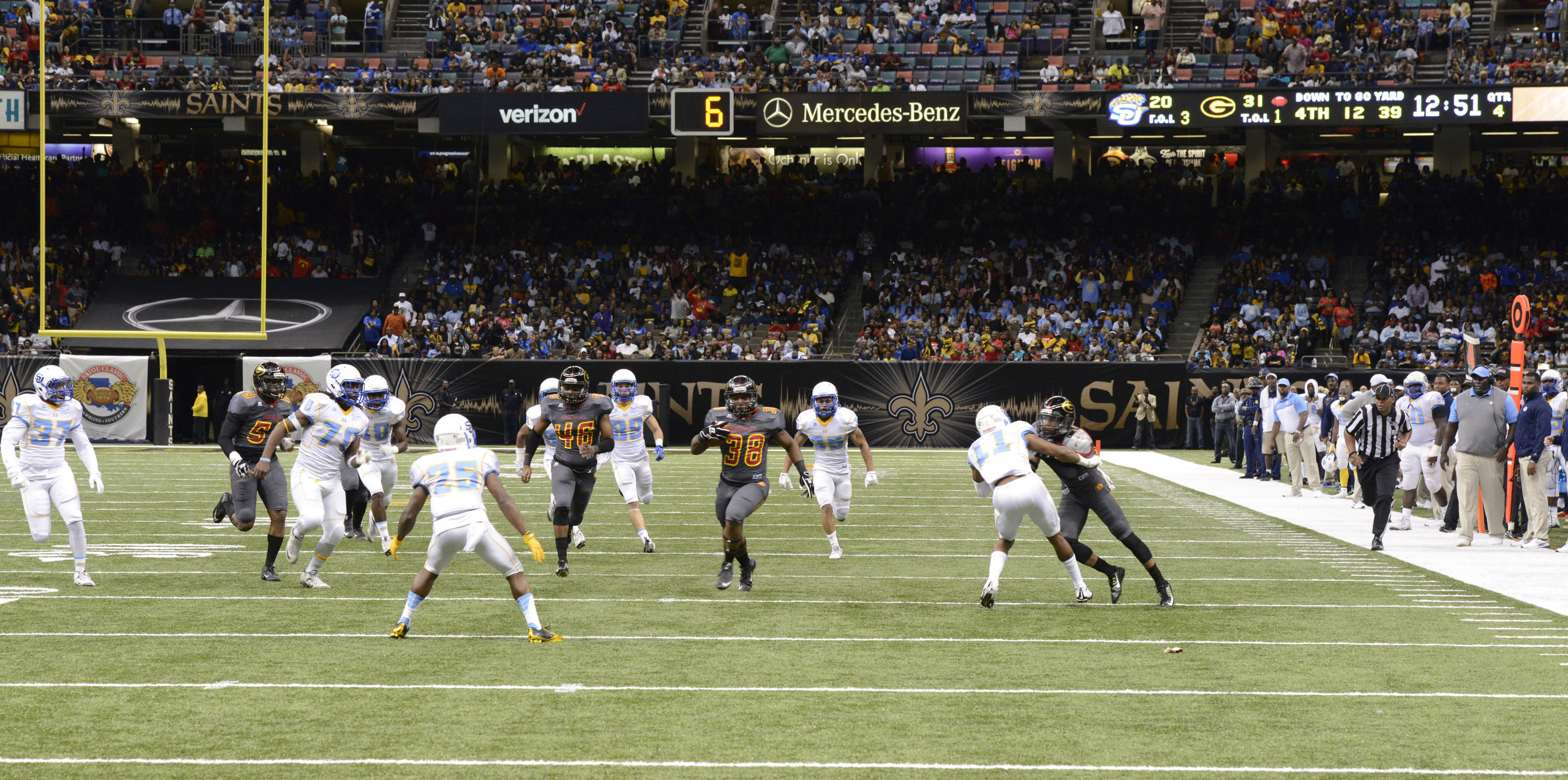
A Grambling State player carries the ball during the 2015 Bayou Classic.

Southern leads the overall series with Grambling, begun in 1932, by a 41–34 margin. This total does not take into account the 2 wins vacated by Southern or the 1 vacated by Grambling, but it does include the 1 game forfeited by Southern.) Grambling State claims the longest winning streak in the all-time series, 9 games from 1970 to 1978 (including the 1972 forfeit). Southern claims the longest winning streak in the Bayou Classic era, 8 games from 1993 to 2000 (the Jaguars also had a previous 8-game winning streak at the start of the series, in the games played between 1932 and 1946). SU's 49–7 victory in 2020 ranks as the largest margin of victory in the Bayou Classic, while SU's 1935 victory (64–6) is the largest margin in the all-time series. Multiple trophies have been awarded to the winner of the Bayou Classic over the years. The most recent trophy, consisting of Waterford Crystal, was retired after the 2014 game after more than 25 years of service and presented to the Smithsonian Institution for its National Museum of African American History and Culture in Washington, D.C. A newly designed trophy has been showcased since the 2015 game.

People prominently involved in the series include Ace Mumford (SU coach from 1936 to 1942 and again 1944–61), Eddie Robinson (SU student—for just a week, as a freshman—in the 1930s and GSU coach from 1941 to 1942 and again 1945–97), Doug Williams (GSU player from 1974 to 1977, SU consultant in 1985, and GSU coach from 1998 to 2003 and again 2011–13), Marino Casem (SU athletic director from 1986 to 1999 and coach from 1987 to 1988 and again 1992), Pete Richardson (SU coach from 1993 to 2009), and Rod Broadway (GSU coach from 2007 to 2010). Mumford once had the third most wins among all college football coaches (behind Pop Warner and Amos Alonzo Stagg), and Robinson later had the most. Today Robinson still has the third most wins (behind John Gagliardi and Joe Paterno) and also has the most wins among all who coached at HBCU schools; Mumford now has the fourth most wins among HBCU coaches behind Robinson, Billy Joe, and John Merritt. Broadway holds the distinction of being the only coach to have ever won a black national title at three different schools, one of which was Grambling.

Prior to 1974, the game was viewed as a big in-state rivalry between the two schools (in the days of Jim Crow, Southern and Grambling usually had the pick of most of the good black high school players in Louisiana). However, it was not nearly the media spectacle that it is today. After it was re-branded as the Bayou Classic and moved to New Orleans, a trophy was added and numerous events were also scheduled to be held throughout the week leading up to the game itself. Games in the series played before 1974 are generally not included within the context of the Bayou Classic's historical lineage (SU led the series 15–10 up until that point). The annual game was known to be touted as a "classic" as early as the 1948 meeting, a game that the Jaguars won in an 18–0 upset before 10,000 fans. A brawl during that game led to a suspension of the series for the next decade (a period in which the Jaguars won three black national championships) and delayed GSU's admittance to SWAC membership until 1958, shortly before the rivalry was resumed. With the renewal of the series in 1959, the game was again billed as a "classic" but proved a bittersweet return as five fans were killed in a vehicular accident on their way to the game. The series was again interrupted in 1972, this time due to political unrest on host Southern's campus—which resulted in a forfeiture by SU. The game was then permanently moved to off-campus neutral sites the following year, drawing a large crowd of 40,000 in Shreveport, Louisiana, and influencing the decision to create the Bayou Classic.

== Game results ==
=== Pre-Bayou Classic results ===
Grambling victories	Southern victories	Tie games

No.	Date	Location	Winner	Score
1	November 11, 1932	Monroe, LA	Southern	20–0
2	November 11, 1933	LA	Southern	20–0
3	September 29, 1934	Scotlandville, LA	Southern	25–9
4	November 30, 1935	Scotlandville, LA	Southern	64–6
5	October 31, 1936	Grambling, LA	Southern	36–0
6	October 22, 1938	Ruston, LA	Southern	20–0
7	October 21, 1939	Grambling, LA	Southern	53–7
8	October 5, 1946	Scotlandville, LA	Southern	38–0
9	October 4, 1947	Grambling, LA	Grambling	21–6
10	October 2, 1948	Scotlandville, LA	Southern	18–0
11	October 3, 1959	Grambling, LA	Southern	12–6
12	October 1, 1960	Scotlandville, LA	Southern	16–6
13	September 30, 1961	Grambling, LA	Southern	20–9

No.	Date	Location	Winner	Score
14	September 29, 1962	Scotlandville, LA	Grambling	14–3
15	September 28, 1963	Grambling, LA	Southern	22–21
16	September 26, 1964	Scotlandville, LA	Grambling	20–17
17	November 20, 1965	Grambling, LA	Grambling	34–14
18	November 19, 1966	Scotlandville, LA	Southern	41–13
19	November 18, 1967	Grambling, LA	Grambling	27–20
20	November 23, 1968	Scotlandville, LA	Grambling	34–32
21	November 22, 1969	Grambling, LA	Southern	15–6
22	November 21, 1970	Scotlandville, LA	Grambling	37–24
23	November 20, 1971	Grambling, LA	Grambling	31–3
24	November 18, 1972	Scotlandville, LA	Grambling	1–0
25	November 17, 1973	Shreveport, LA	Grambling	19–14
Series: Southern leads 15–10

=== Bayou Classic results ===
Grambling State victories	Southern victories	Tie games	Vacates

No.	Date	Location	Winner	Score
1	November 23, 1974	New Orleans	Grambling State	21–0
2	November 29, 1975	New Orleans	Grambling State	33–17
3	November 27, 1976	New Orleans	Grambling State	10–2
4	November 26, 1977	New Orleans	Grambling State	55–20
5	November 25, 1978	New Orleans	Grambling State	28–15
6	December 1, 1979	New Orleans	Southern	14–7
7	November 29, 1980	New Orleans	Grambling State	43–16
8	November 21, 1981	New Orleans	Southern	50–20
9	November 27, 1982	New Orleans	Southern	22–17
10	November 26, 1983	New Orleans	Grambling State	24–10
11	November 24, 1984	New Orleans	Grambling State	31–29
12	November 23, 1985	New Orleans	Grambling State	29–12
13	November 29, 1986	New Orleans	Grambling State	30–3
14	November 28, 1987	New Orleans	Southern	27–21
15	November 26, 1988	New Orleans	Southern	10–3
16	November 18, 1989	New Orleans	Grambling State	44–30
17	November 24, 1990	New Orleans	Grambling State	25–13
18	November 30, 1991	New Orleans	Southern	31–30
19	November 28, 1992	New Orleans	Grambling State	30–27
20	November 27, 1993	New Orleans	Southern	31–13
21	November 26, 1994	New Orleans	Southern	34–7
22	November 25, 1995	New Orleans	Southern	30–14
23	November 30, 1996	New Orleans	Southern	17–12
24	November 29, 1997	New Orleans	Southern	30–7
25	November 28, 1998	New Orleans	Southern	26–14
26	November 27, 1999	New Orleans	Southern	37–31
27	November 25, 2000	New Orleans	Southern	33–29

No.	Date	Location	Winner	Score
28	November 24, 2001	New Orleans	Grambling State	30–20
29	November 30, 2002	New Orleans	Southern	48–24
30	November 29, 2003	New Orleans	Southern	44–41
31	November 27, 2004	New Orleans	Grambling State	24–13
32	November 26, 2005‡	Houston	Grambling State	50–35
33	November 25, 2006	New Orleans	Southern	21–17
34	November 24, 2007	New Orleans	Southern	22–13
35	November 29, 2008	New Orleans	Grambling State	29–14
36	November 28, 2009	New Orleans	Grambling State	31–13
37	November 27, 2010	New Orleans	Grambling State	38–17
38	November 26, 2011	New Orleans	Grambling State	36–12
39	November 24, 2012	New Orleans	Southern	38–33
40	November 30, 2013	New Orleans	Southern	40–17
41	November 29, 2014	New Orleans	Southern	52–45
42	November 28, 2015	New Orleans	Grambling State	34–23
43	November 26, 2016	New Orleans	Grambling State	52–30
44	November 25, 2017	New Orleans	Grambling State	30–21
45	November 24, 2018	New Orleans	Southern	38–28
46	November 30, 2019	New Orleans	Southern	30–28
47	April 17, 2021	Shreveport, LA	Southern	49–7
48	November 27, 2021	New Orleans	Grambling State	29–26
49	November 26, 2022	New Orleans	Southern	34–17
50	November 25, 2023	New Orleans	Southern	27–22
51	November 30, 2024	New Orleans	Southern	24–14
52	November 29, 2025	New Orleans	Southern	28–27
Series: Southern leads 27–24
(On the field: Southern leads 28–24)

‡ Hosted ESPN's College Gameday

== See also ==
- List of NCAA college football rivalry games
- List of black college football classics
