= 1991 Northeastern Huskies football team =

American college football season

1991 Northeastern Huskies football
- Conference: Independent
- Record: 4–7
- Head coach: Barry Gallup (1st season)
- Home stadium: Parsons Field

1991 NCAA Division I-AA independents football standings
	Conf.			Overall
Team	W	L	T	W		L		T
No. 10 Samford ^		–		12	–	2	–	0
No. 16 James Madison ^		–		9	–	4	–	0
No. 13 Youngstown State ^		–		12	–	3	–	0
Georgia Southern		–		7	–	4	–	0
UCF		–		6	–	5	–	0
William & Mary		–		5	–	6	–	0
Liberty		–		4	–	7	–	0
Northeastern		–		4	–	7	–	0
Western Kentucky		–		3	–	8	–	0
Arkansas State		–		1	–	10	–	0
Towson State		–		1	–	10	–	0
^ – NCAA Division I-AA playoff participant; Rankings from NCAA Division I-AA Football Committee poll

The 1991 Northeastern Huskies football team was an American football team that represented Northeastern University as an independent during the 1991 NCAA Division I-AA football season. Led by first-year head coach Barry Gallup, the team compiled a 4–7 record.

== Schedule ==
Date	Opponent	Site	Result	Attendance	Source
September 7	at Colgate	Andy Kerr Stadium; Hamilton, NY	W 35–10	4,750	
September 14	at Maine	Alumni Field; Orono, ME	W 15–14		
September 28	at Youngstown State	Stambaugh Stadium; Youngstown, OH	L 7–59		
October 5	Lock Haven	Parsons Field; Brookline, MA	W 34–0	3,500	
October 12	at Lehigh	Goodman Stadium; Bethlehem, PA	L 22–35	5,012	
October 19	Towson State	Parsons Field; Brookline, MA	W 50–13	3,300	
October 26	No. 9 New Hampshire	Parsons Field; Brookline, MA	L 14–18	8,206	
November 2	vs. UMass	Foxboro Stadium; Foxborough, MA (Jimmy Fund Bowl)	L 12–27	4,620	
November 9	at Rhode Island	Meade Stadium; Kingston, RI	L 20–28	6,603	
November 16	Delaware State	Parsons Field; Brookline, MA	L 20–46	1,240	
November 23	No. 17 James Madison	Parsons Field; Brookline, MA	L 16–24		
Rankings from NCAA Division I-AA Football Committee Poll released prior to the game
