= 1991 Liberty Flames football team =

American college football season

1991 Liberty Flames football
- Conference: Independent
- Record: 4–7
- Head coach: Sam Rutigliano (3rd season)
- Home stadium: Liberty University Stadium

1991 NCAA Division I-AA independents football standings
	Conf.			Overall
Team	W	L	T	W		L		T
No. 10 Samford ^		–		12	–	2	–	0
No. 16 James Madison ^		–		9	–	4	–	0
No. 13 Youngstown State ^		–		12	–	3	–	0
Georgia Southern		–		7	–	4	–	0
UCF		–		6	–	5	–	0
William & Mary		–		5	–	6	–	0
Liberty		–		4	–	7	–	0
Northeastern		–		4	–	7	–	0
Western Kentucky		–		3	–	8	–	0
Arkansas State		–		1	–	10	–	0
Towson State		–		1	–	10	–	0
^ – NCAA Division I-AA playoff participant; Rankings from NCAA Division I-AA Football Committee poll

The 1991 Liberty Flames football team represented Liberty University as an independent during the 1991 NCAA Division I-AA football season. Led by third-year head coach Sam Rutigliano, the Flames compiled an overall record of 4–7.

== Schedule ==
Date	Opponent	Site	Result	Attendance	Source
September 7	at No. 14 Boise State	Bronco Stadium; Boise, ID	L 14–35	20,206	
September 14	at No. 6 Furman	Paladin Stadium; Greenville, SC	L 7–31	14,014	
September 21	West Virginia Tech	Liberty University Stadium; Lynchburg, VA	W 39–11	7,600	
October 5	at Morehead State	Jayne Stadium; Morehead, KY	L 10–12		
October 12	at Delaware State	Alumni Stadium; Dover, DE	W 20–9		
October 19	at Youngstown State	Stambaugh Stadium; Youngstown, OH	W 10–8		
October 26	Towson State	Liberty University Stadium; Lynchburg, VA	W 38–28	9,250	
November 2	No. 14 James Madison	Liberty University Stadium; Lynchburg, VA	L 34–35		
November 9	UCF	Liberty University Stadium; Lynchburg, VA	L 26–31	2,650	
November 16	Kutztown	Liberty University Stadium; Lynchburg, VA	L 16–17		
November 23	at Samford	Seibert Stadium; Homewood, AL	L 19–31		
Rankings from NCAA Division I-AA Football Committee Poll released prior to the game
