= Youngstown State Penguins football =

College football team

2026 Youngstown State Penguins football team
- First season: 1938; 88 years ago
- Head coach: Doug Phillips; 6th season, 31–35 (.470)
- Location: Youngstown, Ohio
- Stadium: Stambaugh Stadium (capacity: 20,630)
- NCAA division: Division I FCS
- Conference: Missouri Valley
- Colors: Red, white, and black
- All-time record: 517–367–17 (.583)

NCAA Division I FCS championships
- 1991, 1993, 1994, 1997

Conference championships
- MCC: 1978, 1979 OVC: 1987 Gateway: 2005, 2006
- Website: YSU Penguins Football

The Youngstown State Penguins football team represents Youngstown State University in American college football. Youngstown State currently plays as a member of the NCAA at the NCAA Division I Football Championship Subdivision (formerly known as Division I-AA) and is a member of the Missouri Valley Football Conference (MVFC). The Penguins have played their home games in Stambaugh Stadium, more commonly called "The Ice Castle," since 1982.

YSU football has been one of the leading programs in the NCAA Division I Football Championship Subdivision, winning four national championships under former head coach Jim Tressel, which is third behind North Dakota State's eight titles and Georgia Southern's six. Overall, YSU has made fourteen playoff appearances since Division I FCS (then Division I-AA) was formed in 1978.

== History ==
=== Conference affiliations ===
- 1938–72: Independent
- 1973–77: NCAA Division II Independent
- 1978–80: Mid-Continent Conference
- 1981–87: Ohio Valley Conference
- 1988–96 NCAA Division I-AA Independent
- 1997–present: Missouri Valley Football Conference (known as the Gateway Football Conference until June 2008)

=== Early history ===
The YSU football program began in 1938 as an Independent NCAA team under head coach Dwight "Dike" Beede. The Penguins played their first game on September 15, 1938, in a 12–6 loss to Geneva College. About a month later, on October 22, 1938, Youngstown State won its first game with a 20–0 shutout at Westminster College (PA). The Penguins won their first home game on November 3, 1938, with a 20–14 win against Davis & Elkins College.

Longtime head coach, Dwight "Dike" Beede, made a historical impact on the game of American football after noticing on-field confusion due to officials using whistles to signal a penalty. Beede invented the penalty flag and it was used for the first time during a game on October 17, 1941, against Oklahoma City University at the Youngstown's Rayen Stadium. The flag is now standard at all football games.

Dwight Beede retired from the program after the 1972 season and was replaced by Rey Dempsey starting in the 1973 season. After 35 years as an independent program, the football team joined NCAA Division II in 1973. In the 1974 season, the Penguins qualified for the Division II playoffs after going 8–1 in the regular season. YSU fell 14–35 against Delaware in the program's first playoff game. Following the 1974 season, Dempsey left Youngstown State to become a special-teams coach for the Detroit Lions 1975, he was In the three seasons at YSU he compiled a 12–8 record.

Bill Narduzzi became the third coach in program history in 1975. The team joined the Mid-Continent Conference in 1978 and recorded a 9-win regular season under Narduzzi and claimed the Mid-Continent Conference Championship. Narduzzi led Youngstown State to its first playoff win on November 25, 1978 against Nebraska–Omaha. The 21–14 win advanced the team into the Division II Semifinal Playoff Game where the Penguins lost to Eastern Illinois 22–26. The team finished the season with a record of 10–2, the first 10-win season for the program. The 1979 season saw Youngstown State claim their second Mid-Continent Conference Champions going undefeated in conference games and losing only a single game to Delaware. The Penguins defeated South Dakota State 50–7 in the Division II Quarterfinal Playoff Game and shut out Alabama A&M 52–0 in the Division II Semifinal Playoff Game. The win in the semifinal round gave Youngstown State its first appearance in an NCAA Football Championship. The Penguins faced the Delaware Fightin' Blue Hens in the Zia Bowl in Albuquerque, New Mexico for the NCAA Division II Championship. In the championship, YSU was defeated by Delaware 21–38 and finished the season with a record of 11–2. In 1981, Youngstown State joined the Ohio Valley Conference (OVC). After going 2–8–1 in the 1980 season, playing a majority of Division I opponents, the Penguins finished their first season in Division I and the OVC with a record of 7–4, including an upset of Cincinnati who was playing as a Division I FBS Independent.

=== Recent history ===
The program's most successful period came from 1986 to 2000 under Jim Tressel. Tressel led the Penguins to four NCAA Division I-AA National Championships. In 1991, YSU won its first national championship, defeating Marshall, and won two more national championships in the following three seasons: against Marshall in 1993 and Boise State in 1994. The Penguins won a fourth title in 1997 with a 10–9 victory against McNeese State. The Tressel era of YSU football also included two stints as national runner-up in 1992 and 1999. YSU's four national championships are third in Division I FCS only to North Dakota State's ten titles and Georgia Southern's six. Tressel was also named Division I-AA Coach of the Year in ’91, ’93, ’94 and ’97.

Tressel left Youngstown State following the 2000 season to coach Ohio State, where he coached from 2001 to 2010. Tressel resigned from Ohio State in 2011 after an NCAA investigation of rules violations during the 2010 season and Ohio State self-vacating their wins for the 2010 season. Tressel's first incident with the NCAA came during his tenure as YSU head coach when it emerged in 1994 that Ray Issac, the quarterback on the Penguins' 1991 national championship team, had received benefits from Mickey Monus, who was a major benefactor to Youngstown State University. Over Issac's college career, Monus gifted $10,000 in cash and the use of several cars. The NCAA inquired after being tipped off about Monus' actions but dropped it after a cursory internal investigation by Youngstown State. The true scope of the violations was only revealed in 1998 when Isaac admitted tampering with a juror in Monus' fraud trial. Youngstown State admitted to a lack of institutional control and docked itself some scholarships, but was allowed to keep its 1991 title since the statute of limitations had expired.

His successor, Jon Heacock, did not win a national championship, but still delivered consistent seasons and took them to a national semifinal appearance in 2006 (losing to eventual national champion Appalachian State) before resigning following the 2009 season. Eric Wolford, a Youngstown native who has been labeled a top recruiter at the NCAA Division I Football Bowl Subdivision level, was named the sixth head coach in school history on December 15, 2009. Wolford recorded a 3–8 record in his first season in 2010. Despite the record, Youngstown State led at some point in all but one game they played. The streak was ended in the first game of the 2011 season when YSU lost to Michigan State 6–28 and never held a lead in the game. The 2011 season featured improvement to a 6–5 record, highlighted by a victory over eventual FCS National Champion North Dakota State.

The Penguins beat Pittsburgh, 31–17, on September 1, 2012, at Heinz Field in Pittsburgh. This marked the first time the Penguins had ever beaten a Bowl Championship Series team, though they have several wins over FBS teams from non-automatic qualifier conferences, such as the MAC.

The 2016 Penguins went on to the NCAA FCS Championship, in which they lost to James Madison, 28–14. YSU would have not made it to the FCS National Championship game if it were not for one of the best catches in College Football History. In the FCS Semifinals, the Penguins visited Eastern Washington. The Penguins won by a score of 40 to 38. The Penguins prevailed thanks to a touchdown catch by Kevin Rader with one second on the clock. Rader caught the pass pinned to the defender's back from Quarterback Hunter Wells.

== National championships ==
Youngstown State has won four national championships.

Season	Coach	Selector	Record	Result	Opponent
1991	Jim Tressel	NCAA Division I-AA	12–3	25–17	Marshall
1993	Jim Tressel	NCAA Division I-AA	13–2	17–5	Marshall
1994	Jim Tressel	NCAA Division I-AA	14–0–1	28–14	Boise State
1997	Jim Tressel	NCAA Division I-AA	13–2	10–9	McNeese State

== Conference championships ==
Youngstown State has won five conference championships, three outright and two shared. Note that the team was not a member of any conference before 1978 and from 1988 to 1996.

Season	Coach	Conference	Overall Record	Conference Record
1978	Bill Narduzzi	The Summit League	10–2	5–0
1979	Bill Narduzzi	The Summit League	11–2	5–0
1987†	Jim Tressel	Ohio Valley Conference	8–4	5–1
2005†	Jon Heacock	Gateway Football Conference	8–3	5–2
2006	Jon Heacock	Gateway Football Conference	11–3	6–1

† denotes co-champion

== Postseason history ==
=== NCAA Division II ===
Season	Round	Winner	Score	Loser	Score
1978	II Quarterfinal	Youngstown State	21	Nebraska–Omaha	14
1978	II Semifinal	Eastern Illinois	26	Youngstown State	22
1979	II Quarterfinal	Youngstown State	50	South Dakota State	7
1979	II Semifinal	Youngstown State	52	Alabama A&M	0
1979	II Championship Game	Delaware	38	Youngstown State	21

=== NCAA Division I-AA/FCS ===
Season	Round	Winner	Score	Loser	Score
1987	I-AA First Round	Northern Iowa	31	Youngstown State	28
1989	I-AA First Round	Youngstown State	28	Eastern Kentucky	24
1989	I-AA Quarterfinal	Furman	42	Youngstown State	23
1990	I-AA First Round	Central Florida	20	Youngstown State	17
1991	I-AA First Round	Youngstown State	17	Villanova	16
1991	I-AA Quarterfinal	Youngstown State	30	Nevada	28
1991	I-AA Semifinal	Youngstown State	10	Samford	0
1991	I-AA Championship Game	Youngstown State	25	Marshall	17
1992	I-AA First Round	Youngstown State	23	Villanova	20
1992	I-AA Quarterfinal	Youngstown State	42	The Citadel	17
1992	I-AA Semifinal	Youngstown State	19	Northern Iowa	7
1992	I-AA Championship Game	Marshall	31	Youngstown State	28
1993	I-AA First Round	Youngstown State	56	Central Florida	30
1993	I-AA Quarterfinal	Youngstown State	34	Georgia Southern	14
1993	I-AA Semifinal	Youngstown State	35	Idaho	16
1993	I-AA Championship Game	Youngstown State	17	Marshall	5
1994	I-AA First Round	Youngstown State	63	Alcorn State	20
1994	I-AA Quarterfinal	Youngstown State	18	Eastern Kentucky	15
1994	I-AA Semifinal	Youngstown State	28	Montana	9
1994	I-AA Championship Game	Youngstown State	28	Boise State	14
1997	I-AA First Round	Youngstown State	28	Hampton	13
1997	I-AA Quarterfinal	Youngstown State	37	Villanova	34
1997	I-AA Semifinal	Youngstown State	25	Eastern Washington	14
1997	I-AA Championship Game	Youngstown State	10	McNeese State	9
1999	I-AA First Round	Youngstown State	30	Montana	27
1999	I-AA Quarterfinal	Youngstown State	41	North Carolina A&T	3
1999	I-AA Semifinal	Youngstown State	27	Florida A&M	24
1999	I-AA Championship Game	Georgia Southern	59	Youngstown State	24
2000	I-AA First Round	Richmond	10	Youngstown State	3
2006	FCS First Round	Youngstown State	35	James Madison	31
2006	FCS Quarterfinal	Youngstown State	28	Illinois State	21
2006	FCS Semifinal	Appalachian State	49	Youngstown State	24
2016	FCS First Round	Youngstown State	38	Samford	24
2016	FCS Second Round	Youngstown State	40	Jacksonville State	24
2016	FCS Quarterfinal	Youngstown State	30	Wofford	23 ^{OT}
2016	FCS Semifinal	Youngstown State	40	Eastern Washington	38
2016	FCS Championship Game	James Madison	28	Youngstown State	14
2023	FCS First Round	Youngstown State	40	Duquesne	7
2023	FCS Second Round	Villanova	45	Youngstown State	28
2025	FCS First Round	Yale	43	Youngstown State	42

== Home venue ==
YSU plays its home games at Stambaugh Stadium, nicknamed "The Ice Castle", which has an official capacity of 20,630.

== Rivalries ==
=== Akron ===
The Penguins have played the Zips 35 times in football. They played for the Steel Tire, named for the products that both cities were known for. The trophy comes from the main products of the two cities; Akron for its rubber and Youngstown for its steel. In 1995, the series was discontinued with Youngstown State holding a 19–14–2 edge. The two schools were scheduled to meet on September 5, 2020, but was canceled due to continuing concerns over the COVID-19 pandemic.

=== Other rivals ===
Other rivals of the Penguins include conference members; Northern Iowa and North Dakota State along with Mid-American Conference (MAC) member Kent State.

== Notable players ==
The Penguins have sent 21 players to the NFL, including safety Brandian Ross and guard Lamar Mady. Some of their most well-known football alumni include current ESPN Analyst Ron Jaworski, Jeff Wilkins, Paul McFadden, Donald Jones, and Cliff Stoudt. Former Kansas head coach Mark Mangino played at and began his coaching career at Youngstown State. Former Notre Dame head coach Bob Davie played for the Penguins. Quarterback Ray Isaac played in the Arena Football League. Rudy Florio played in the Canadian Football League. Actor Ed O'Neill, known for his roles in Married... with Children and Modern Family, played defensive lineman at Youngstown State.

== Future non-conference opponents ==
Future non-conference opponents announced as of September 21, 2026.

2027	2028	2029	2033
at Toledo	at Mercyhurst	at Ohio State	at Toledo
Villanova	Valparaiso		
at Maryland	at West Virginia		
Robert Morris	Towson		

== See also ==
- Youngstown State Penguins
