= 1991 Towson State Tigers football team =

American college football season

1991 Towson State Tigers football
- Conference: Independent
- Record: 1–10
- Head coach: Phil Albert (20th season)
- Home stadium: Minnegan Stadium

1991 NCAA Division I-AA independents football standings
	Conf.			Overall
Team	W	L	T	W		L		T
No. 10 Samford ^		–		12	–	2	–	0
No. 16 James Madison ^		–		9	–	4	–	0
No. 13 Youngstown State ^		–		12	–	3	–	0
Georgia Southern		–		7	–	4	–	0
UCF		–		6	–	5	–	0
William & Mary		–		5	–	6	–	0
Liberty		–		4	–	7	–	0
Northeastern		–		4	–	7	–	0
Western Kentucky		–		3	–	8	–	0
Arkansas State		–		1	–	10	–	0
Towson State		–		1	–	10	–	0
^ – NCAA Division I-AA playoff participant; Rankings from NCAA Division I-AA Football Committee poll

The 1991 Towson State Tigers football team was an American football team that represented Towson State University (now known as Towson University) as an independent during the 1991 NCAA Division I-AA football season. Led by 20th-year head coach Phil Albert, the team compiled a 1–10 record.

== Schedule ==
Date	Opponent	Site	Result	Attendance	Source
September 14	Boston University	Minnegan Stadium; Towson, MD	L 8–10	3,476	
September 21	Delaware State	Minnegan Stadium; Towson, MD	L 7–13	3,729	
September 28	Rhode Island	Minnegan Stadium; Towson, MD	L 25–45	2,846	
October 5	No. 1 (D-II) IUP	Minnegan Stadium; Towson, MD	L 10–54	3,210	
October 12	at No. T–11 James Madison	Bridgeforth Stadium; Harrisonburg, VA	L 31–55		
October 19	at Northeastern	Parsons Field; Brookline, MA	L 13–50	3,300	
October 26	at Liberty	Liberty University Stadium; Lynchburg, VA	L 28–38	9,250	
November 2	Hofstra	Minnegan Stadium; Towson, MD	L 26–30	3,954	
November 9	at Howard	William H. Greene Stadium; Washington, DC	W 13–7	3,150	
November 16	at Maine	Alumni Field; Orono, ME	L 34–49	3,246	
November 23	No. 14 Youngstown State	Minnegan Stadium; Towson, MD	L 17–27	1,210	
Rankings from NCAA Division I-AA Football Committee Poll released prior to the game
