= Al Kincaid =

American football player and coach (born 1947)

Biographical details
- Born: July 26, 1947 (age 79)

Playing career
- 1967–1969: Virginia Tech
- Position: Quarterback

Coaching career (HC unless noted)
- 1971–1973: Giles HS (VA)
- 1974–1975: Alabama (GA / JV OB)
- 1976–1979: East Carolina (OC)
- 1980: Wyoming (OC)
- 1981–1985: Wyoming
- 1989: Alabama (RC)
- 1990–1991: Arkansas State
- 1998: Temple (AHC/OC)

Head coaching record
- Overall: 33–46–1 (college); 16–12–2 (high school)

Al Kincaid (born July 26, 1947) is an American former football player and coach. He served as the head football coach at the University of Wyoming from 1981 to 1985 and at Arkansas State University from 1990 to 1991, compiling a career college football record of 33–46–1.

== Playing career ==
Kincaid is a native of Alabama and was the star quarterback at Virginia Tech. He was the starter for the 1967 and 1968 seasons, and in 1968, he took the team to a 7-4 record, including a Liberty Bowl appearance against Mississippi. However, he lost the starting job in the second game of the 1969 season, after playing well in the season opener against Alabama. His career record was 122 completions in 261 attempts for 1,202 yards and five touchdowns. He was intercepted 13 times. He also rushed for 499 yards and two touchdowns.

== Coaching career ==
=== High school and college assistant coaching ===
Kincaid and his family relocated to St. Petersburg, Florida after he completed his college degree. He had planned to go into business there, but his offer to help coach a local high school football team soon earned him a full-time job instead. The couple moved to Virginia, where he coached a rural high school team in the Appalachian Mountains.

Kincaid moved on to coaching positions at the University of Alabama under Bear Bryant and at East Carolina University.

=== Wyoming ===
Kincaid became offensive coordinator at Wyoming under Pat Dye, and succeeded him as head coach after the 1980 season. He signed a three-year contract at $45,000 per year, agreeing to have 20% of the salary withheld in interest-bearing escrow and forfeited if he broke his contract. In 1983, he was courted by Memphis State University after head coach Rex Dockery died in a plane crash, but he withdrew his name from consideration, deciding to remain at Wyoming.

In his five years leading Wyoming, he compiled a record of 29–29. Following a 3–8 season in 1985, he was fired and was succeeded by Dennis Erickson.

=== Arkansas State ===
Kincaid went on to be the 22nd head coach at Arkansas State University for the 1990 and 1991 seasons. He accumulated a record of 4–17–1.

== Personal life ==
Kincaid worked as a sports consultant in Decatur, Alabama, and then returned to Tuscaloosa and coaching, again serving as an assistant at the University of Alabama. From there, he went on to become head coach at Arkansas State.

In 1992, Kincaid's 23-year marriage ended in divorce. His ex-wife, Nanci Kincaid, married Arizona head coach Dick Tomey in 1997. However, the couple remained close, and as a writer in North Carolina, she still was assisting him in player recruiting in 1998 when he was an assistant head football coach and offensive coordinator at Temple University.

== Head coaching record ==
=== College ===
Year	Team	Overall	Conference	Standing	Bowl/playoffs
Wyoming Cowboys (Western Athletic Conference) (1981–1985)
1981	Wyoming	8–3	6–2	T–3rd	
1982	Wyoming	5–7	2–6	8th	
1983	Wyoming	7–5	5–3	3rd	
1984	Wyoming	6–6	4–4	6th	
1985	Wyoming	3–8	2–6	T–7th	
Wyoming:		29–29	19–21		
Arkansas State Indians (NCAA Division I-AA independent) (1990–1991)
1990	Arkansas State	3–7–1			
1991	Arkansas State	1–10			
Arkansas State:		4–17–1			
Total:		33–46–1			
