= 1991 Boston University Terriers football team =

American college football season

1991 Boston University Terriers football
- Conference: Yankee Conference
- Record: 4–7 (3–5 Yankee)
- Head coach: Dan Allen (2nd season)
- Offensive coordinator: Tony Sparano (3rd season)
- Defensive coordinator: Chris Rippon (2nd season)
- Home stadium: Nickerson Field

1991 Yankee Conference football standings
	Conf.					Overall
Team	W		L		T	W		L		T
No. 6 Delaware +^	7	–	1	–	0	10	–	2	–	0
No. 7 Villanova +^	7	–	1	–	0	10	–	2	–	0
No. 11 New Hampshire +^	7	–	1	–	0	9	–	3	–	0
Rhode Island	3	–	5	–	0	6	–	5	–	0
UMass	3	–	5	–	0	4	–	7	–	0
Boston University	3	–	5	–	0	4	–	7	–	0
Maine	2	–	6	–	0	3	–	8	–	0
Connecticut	2	–	6	–	0	3	–	8	–	0
Richmond	2	–	6	–	0	2	–	9	–	0
+ – Conference co-champions; ^ – NCAA Division I-AA playoff participant; Rankings from NCAA Division I-AA Football Committee poll

The 1991 Boston University Terriers football team was an American football team that represented Boston University as a member of the Yankee Conference during the 1991 NCAA Division I-AA football season. In their second season under head coach Dan Allen, the Terriers compiled a 4–7 record (3–5 against conference opponents), finished in three-way tie for fourth place in the Yankee Conference, and were outscored by a total of 292 to 232.

== Schedule ==
Date	Opponent	Site	Result	Attendance	Source
September 7	No. 4 William & Mary*	Nickerson Field; Boston, MA	L 22–48	3,630	
September 14	at Towson State	Minnegan Stadium; Towson, MD	W 10–8	3,476	
September 21	No. 10 Holy Cross	Nickerson Field; Boston, MA	L 23–27	5,181	
September 28	UMass	Nickerson Field; Boston, MA	L 7–15	3,074	
October 5	at No. 8 Villanova	Villanova Stadium; Villanova, PA	L 6–56	12,000	
October 12	No. 16 Delaware	Nickerson Field; Boston, MA	L 21–35	1,839	
October 19	at Richmond	University of Richmond Stadium; Richmond, VA	L 18–32	8,562	
October 26	Rhode Island	Nickerson Field; Boston, MA	W 43–0	5,475	
November 2	No. 8 New Hampshire	Cowell Stadium; Durham, NH	L 26–45		
November 9	Maine	Nickerson Field; Boston, MA	W 27–0		
November 16	at Connecticut	Memorial Stadium; Storrs, CT	W 29–26	3,343	
*Non-conference game; Rankings from NCAA Division I-AA Football Committee Poll released prior to the game
