= 1991 Maine Black Bears football team =

American college football season

1991 Maine Black Bears football
- Conference: Yankee Conference
- Record: 3–8 (2–6 Yankee)
- Head coach: Kirk Ferentz (2nd season)
- Offensive coordinator: Jack Cosgrove (3rd season)
- Defensive coordinator: Ray Zingler (2nd season)
- Captains: Paul Capriotti; Brian Roche
- Home stadium: Alumni Field

1991 Yankee Conference football standings
	Conf.					Overall
Team	W		L		T	W		L		T
No. 6 Delaware +^	7	–	1	–	0	10	–	2	–	0
No. 7 Villanova +^	7	–	1	–	0	10	–	2	–	0
No. 11 New Hampshire +^	7	–	1	–	0	9	–	3	–	0
Rhode Island	3	–	5	–	0	6	–	5	–	0
UMass	3	–	5	–	0	4	–	7	–	0
Boston University	3	–	5	–	0	4	–	7	–	0
Maine	2	–	6	–	0	3	–	8	–	0
Connecticut	2	–	6	–	0	3	–	8	–	0
Richmond	2	–	6	–	0	2	–	9	–	0
+ – Conference co-champions; ^ – NCAA Division I-AA playoff participant; Rankings from NCAA Division I-AA Football Committee poll

The 1991 Maine Black Bears football team was an American football team that represented the University of Maine as a member of the Yankee Conference during the 1991 NCAA Division I-AA football season. In their second season under head coach Kirk Ferentz, the Black Bears compiled a 3–8 record (2–6 against conference opponents) and finished in a three-way tie for last place in the conference. Paul Capriotti and Brian Roche were the team captains.

== Schedule ==
Date	Opponent	Site	Result	Attendance	Source
September 7	Villanova	Alumni Field; Orono, ME	L 7–48	7,796	
September 14	Northeastern*	Alumni Field; Orono, ME	L 14–15		
September 21	UMass	Alumni Field; Orono, ME	L 3–10	9,746	
September 28	at No. T–20 New Hampshire	Cowell Stadium; Durham, NH (rivalry)	L 20–38	9,533	
October 5	Richmond	Alumni Field; Orono, ME	W 19–15	9,368	
October 12	at Rutgers	Rutgers Stadium; Piscataway, NJ	L 17–40	27,221	
October 19	at Rhode Island	Meade Stadium; Kingston, RI	L 30–52	10,145	
October 26	Connecticut	Alumni Field; Orono, ME	W 41–20		
November 2	at No. 9 Delaware	Delaware Stadium; Newark, DE	L 10–34	22,601	
November 9	at Boston University	Nickerson Field; Boston, MA	L 0–27		
November 16	Towson State	Alumni Field; Orono, ME	W 49–34	3,246	
*Non-conference game; Rankings from NCAA Division I-AA Football Committee Poll released prior to the game
