= 1991 Richmond Spiders football team =

American college football season

1991 Richmond Spiders football
- Conference: Yankee Conference
- Record: 2–9 (2–6 Yankee)
- Head coach: Jim Marshall (3rd season)
- Home stadium: UR Stadium

1991 Yankee Conference football standings
	Conf.					Overall
Team	W		L		T	W		L		T
No. 6 Delaware +^	7	–	1	–	0	10	–	2	–	0
No. 7 Villanova +^	7	–	1	–	0	10	–	2	–	0
No. 11 New Hampshire +^	7	–	1	–	0	9	–	3	–	0
Rhode Island	3	–	5	–	0	6	–	5	–	0
UMass	3	–	5	–	0	4	–	7	–	0
Boston University	3	–	5	–	0	4	–	7	–	0
Maine	2	–	6	–	0	3	–	8	–	0
Connecticut	2	–	6	–	0	3	–	8	–	0
Richmond	2	–	6	–	0	2	–	9	–	0
+ – Conference co-champions; ^ – NCAA Division I-AA playoff participant; Rankings from NCAA Division I-AA Football Committee poll

The 1991 Richmond Spiders football team was an American football team that represented the University of Richmond as a member of the Yankee Conference during the 1991 NCAA Division I-AA football season. In their third season under head coach Jim Marshall, Richmond compiled a 2–9 record, with a mark of 2–6 in conference play, finishing tied for seventh place in the Yankee.

== Schedule ==
Date	Opponent	Site	Result	Attendance	Source
September 14	Rhode Island	UR Stadium; Richmond, VA	W 19–10	6,078	
September 21	No. 16 Villanova	UR Stadium; Richmond, VA	L 3–35	7,200	
September 28	VMI*	UR Stadium; Richmond, VA (rivalry)	L 27–38	20,052	
October 5	at Maine	Alumni Field; Orono, ME	L 15–19	9,368	
October 12	at No. 14 New Hampshire	Cowell Stadium; Durham, NH	L 0–34	11,077	
October 19	Boston University	UR Stadium; Richmond, VA	W 32–18	8,562	
October 26	at No. 17 James Madison*	Bridgeforth Stadium; Harrisonburg, VA	L 42–47	13,369	
November 2	Connecticut	UR Stadium; Richmond, VA	L 34–35	7,612	
November 9	at UMass	McGuirk Stadium; Hadley, MA	L 14–42	4,427	
November 16	at No. 6 Delaware	Delaware Stadium; Newark, DE	L 17–23	17,812	
November 23	at William & Mary*	Zable Stadium; Williamsburg, VA (rivalry)	L 7–49	12,216	
*Non-conference game; Rankings from NCAA Division I-AA Football Committee Poll released prior to the game
