= 1991 Troy State Trojans football team =

American college football season

1991 Troy State Trojans football
- Conference: Independent
- Record: 5–6
- Head coach: Larry Blakeney (1st season)
- Offensive coordinator: Don Jacobs (1st season)
- Defensive coordinator: Johnny Williams (4th season)
- Home stadium: Veterans Memorial Stadium

1991 NCAA Division II independents football records
	Conf.			Overall
Team	W	L	T	W		L		T
No. 20 Wofford ^		–		9	–	3	–	0
Springfield		–		7	–	3	–	0
Southern Connecticut State		–		6	–	3	–	0
UC Santa Barbara		–		5	–	3	–	0
Michigan Tech		–		6	–	4	–	0
Saint Mary's		–		6	–	5	–	0
Tennessee–Martin		–		5	–	6	–	0
Troy State		–		5	–	6	–	0
American International		–		4	–	5	–	1
New Haven		–		3	–	7	–	0
Wayne State (NE)		–		3	–	7	–	0
Kentucky State		–		2	–	9	–	0
Central Connecticut		–		1	–	8	–	1
Lees–McRae		–		1	–	9	–	0
^ – NCAA Division II playoff participant; Rankings from NCAA Division II Football Committee poll

The 1991 Troy State Trojans football team represented Troy State University (now known as Troy University) as an independent during the 1991 NCAA Division II football season. Led by first-year head coach Larry Blakeney, the Trojans compiled an overall record of 5–6.

== Schedule ==
Date	Opponent	Site	Result	Attendance	Source
August 31	at UCF	Citrus Bowl; Orlando, FL	L 10–21	18,586	
September 14	West Georgia	Veterans Memorial Stadium; Troy, AL	W 13–10	3,500	
September 21	Nicholls State	Veterans Memorial Stadium; Troy, AL	L 17–25	5,000	
September 28	at No. 15 (I-AA) Alabama State	Cramton Bowl; Montgomery, AL	L 19–22	14,300	
October 5	at Valdosta State	Cleveland Field; Valdosta, GA	W 20–14	3,378	
October 12	Southern Illinois	Veterans Memorial Stadium; Troy, AL	W 30–13	5,500	
October 19	at Western Kentucky	L. T. Smith Stadium; Bowling Green, KY	W 39–23	10,980	
October 26	North Alabama	Veterans Memorial Stadium; Troy, AL	W 31–9	10,500	
November 2	at Samford	Seibert Stadium; Homewood, AL	L 22–24	7,131	
November 9	at Arkansas State	Indian Stadium; Jonesboro, AR	L 17–20	16,015	
November 16	at Georgia Southern	Paulson Stadium; Statesboro, GA	L 12–19	18,590	
Rankings from Coaches' Poll released prior to the game
