= 1991 Connecticut Huskies football team =

American college football season

1991 Connecticut Huskies football
- Conference: Yankee Conference
- Record: 3–8 (2–6 Yankee)
- Head coach: Tom Jackson (9th season)
- Home stadium: Memorial Stadium

1991 Yankee Conference football standings
	Conf.					Overall
Team	W		L		T	W		L		T
No. 6 Delaware +^	7	–	1	–	0	10	–	2	–	0
No. 7 Villanova +^	7	–	1	–	0	10	–	2	–	0
No. 11 New Hampshire +^	7	–	1	–	0	9	–	3	–	0
Rhode Island	3	–	5	–	0	6	–	5	–	0
UMass	3	–	5	–	0	4	–	7	–	0
Boston University	3	–	5	–	0	4	–	7	–	0
Maine	2	–	6	–	0	3	–	8	–	0
Connecticut	2	–	6	–	0	3	–	8	–	0
Richmond	2	–	6	–	0	2	–	9	–	0
+ – Conference co-champions; ^ – NCAA Division I-AA playoff participant; Rankings from NCAA Division I-AA Football Committee poll

The 1991 Connecticut Huskies football team represented the University of Connecticut in the 1991 NCAA Division I-AA football season. The Huskies were led by ninth-year head coach Tom Jackson, and completed the season with a record of 3–8.

== Schedule ==
Date	Opponent	Site	Result	Attendance	Source
September 7	No. 6 Furman*	Memorial Stadium; Storrs, CT	L 24–35	9,108	
September 14	at New Hampshire	Cowell Stadium; Durham, NH	L 16–21	6,802	
September 21	Lehigh*	Memorial Stadium; Storrs, CT	L 19–35	13,112	
September 28	at No. 13 Villanova	Villanova Stadium; Villanova, PA	L 13–35	10,116	
October 5	at Yale*	Yale Bowl; New Haven, CT	W 34–20	12,000	
October 19	UMass	Memorial Stadium; Storrs, CT (rivalry)	W 26–21	10,142	
October 26	at Maine	Alumni Field; Orono, ME	L 20–41		
November 2	at Richmond	UR Stadium; Richmond, VA	W 35–34	7,612	
November 9	No. 8 Delaware	Memorial Stadium; Storrs, CT	L 18–49	7,424	
November 16	Boston University	Memorial Stadium; Storrs, CT	L 26–29	3,343	
November 23	at Rhode Island	Meade Stadium; Kingston, RI (rivalry)	L 10–20	6,448	
*Non-conference game; Rankings from NCAA Division I-AA Football Committee Poll released prior to the game

== After the season ==
=== NFL draft ===
The following Husky was selected in the National Football League draft following the season.

Round	Pick	Player	Position	NFL club
12	318	Cornelius Benton	Guard	Seattle Seahawks
