= 1991 Western Kentucky Hilltoppers football team =

American college football season

1991 Western Kentucky Hilltoppers football
- Conference: Independent
- Record: 3–8
- Head coach: Jack Harbaugh (3rd season)
- Captain: Milton Biggins
- Home stadium: L. T. Smith Stadium

1991 NCAA Division I-AA independents football standings
	Conf.			Overall
Team	W	L	T	W		L		T
No. 10 Samford ^		–		12	–	2	–	0
No. 16 James Madison ^		–		9	–	4	–	0
No. 13 Youngstown State ^		–		12	–	3	–	0
Georgia Southern		–		7	–	4	–	0
UCF		–		6	–	5	–	0
William & Mary		–		5	–	6	–	0
Liberty		–		4	–	7	–	0
Northeastern		–		4	–	7	–	0
Western Kentucky		–		3	–	8	–	0
Arkansas State		–		1	–	10	–	0
Towson State		–		1	–	10	–	0
^ – NCAA Division I-AA playoff participant; Rankings from NCAA Division I-AA Football Committee poll

The 1991 Western Kentucky Hilltoppers football team represented Western Kentucky University as an independent during the 1991 NCAA Division I-AA football season Led by third-year head coach Jack Harbaugh, the Hilltoppers compiled a record of 3–8. The team's captain was Milton Biggins.

== Schedule ==
Date	Opponent	Site	Result	Attendance	Source
September 7	at Austin Peay	Municipal Stadium; Clarksville, TN	L 14–18	5,807	
September 14	Murray State	L. T. Smith Stadium; Bowling Green, KY (rivalry)	W 14–0	12,222	
September 21	Morehead State	L. T. Smith Stadium; Bowling Green, KY	W 48–21	8,180	
October 5	No. T–12 Middle Tennessee	L. T. Smith Stadium; Bowling Green, KY	L 21–23	8,068	
October 12	at No. 3 Eastern Kentucky	Roy Kidd Stadium; Richmond, KY (rivalry)	L 22–37	18,800	
October 19	Troy State^{†}	L. T. Smith Stadium; Bowling Green, KY	L 23–39	10,980	
October 26	No. 4 Northern Iowa	L. T. Smith Stadium; Bowling Green, KY	L 21–49	3,228	
November 2	at Chattanooga	Chamberlain Field; Chattanooga, TN	L 22–26	7,102	
November 9	Eastern Illinois	L. T. Smith Stadium; Bowling Green, KY	W 28–26	4,124	
November 16	at Indiana State	Memorial Stadium; Terre Haute, IN	L 14–31	2,701	
November 23	at Illinois State	Hancock Stadium; Normal, IL	L 8–31	7,104	
^{†}Homecoming; Rankings from NCAA Division I-AA Football Committee Poll released prior to the game
