= 1991 Rhode Island Rams football team =

American college football season

1991 Rhode Island Rams football
- Conference: Yankee Conference
- New England Division
- Record: 6–5 (3–5 Yankee)
- Head coach: Bob Griffin (16th season)
- Home stadium: Meade Stadium

1991 Yankee Conference football standings
	Conf.					Overall
Team	W		L		T	W		L		T
No. 6 Delaware +^	7	–	1	–	0	10	–	2	–	0
No. 7 Villanova +^	7	–	1	–	0	10	–	2	–	0
No. 11 New Hampshire +^	7	–	1	–	0	9	–	3	–	0
Rhode Island	3	–	5	–	0	6	–	5	–	0
UMass	3	–	5	–	0	4	–	7	–	0
Boston University	3	–	5	–	0	4	–	7	–	0
Maine	2	–	6	–	0	3	–	8	–	0
Connecticut	2	–	6	–	0	3	–	8	–	0
Richmond	2	–	6	–	0	2	–	9	–	0
+ – Conference co-champions; ^ – NCAA Division I-AA playoff participant; Rankings from NCAA Division I-AA Football Committee poll

The 1991 Rhode Island Rams football team was an American football team that represented the University of Rhode Island in the Yankee Conference during the 1991 NCAA Division I-AA football season. In their 16th season under head coach Bob Griffin, the Rams compiled a 6–5 record (3–5 against conference opponents) and tied for fourth place out of nine teams in the conference.

== Schedule ==
Date	Opponent	Site	Result	Attendance	Source
September 14	at Richmond	University of Richmond Stadium; Richmond, VA	L 10–19	6,078	
September 21	No. 8 Delaware	Meade Stadium; Kingston, RI	L 7–42	7,871	
September 28	at Towson State*	Minnegan Stadium; Towson, MD	W 45–25	2,846	
October 5	at Brown*	Brown Stadium; Providence, RI (rivalry)	W 38–36	8,200	
October 12	at UMass	McGuirk Stadium; Hadley, MA	W 17–14	9,427	
October 19	Maine^{†}	Meade Stadium; Kingston, RI	W 52–30	10,145	
October 26	at Boston University	Nickerson Field; Boston, MA	L 0–43	5,475	
November 2	No. T–10 Villanova	Meade Stadium; Kingston, RI	L 14–49	3,052	
November 9	Northeastern*	Meade Stadium; Kingston, RI	W 28–20	6,603	
November 16	at No. 15 New Hampshire	Cowell Stadium; Durham, NH	L 35–42	6,639	
November 23	Connecticut	Meade Stadium; Kingston, RI (rivalry)	W 20–10	6,448	
*Non-conference game; ^{†}Homecoming; Rankings from NCAA Division I-AA Football Committee Poll released prior to the game
