= Samford Bulldogs football =

American college football program

2026 Samford Bulldogs football team
- First season: 1902; 124 years ago
- Athletic director: Martin Newton
- Head coach: John Grass; 1st season, 0–0 (–)
- Location: Homewood, Alabama
- Stadium: Bobby Bowden Field at Pete Hanna Stadium (capacity: 6,700)
- NCAA division: Division I FCS
- Conference: Southern
- Colors: Blue and red
- All-time record: 474–464–47 (.505)

Conference championships
- Dixie: 1933, 1935, 1936 SoCon: 2013, 2022
- Consensus All-Americans: 27
- Rivalries: Jacksonville State (rivalry); Furman; Chattanooga; Mercer; Tennessee Tech
- Mascot: Sam, changed from Spike in 2017
- Website: SamfordSports.com

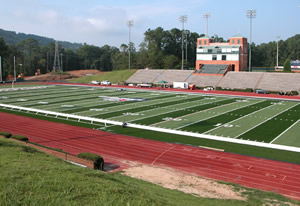
Bobby Bowden Field at Pete Hanna Stadium, home of Bulldogs football team

The Samford Bulldogs football program is the intercollegiate American football team for Samford University located in Homewood, Alabama. The team competes at the NCAA Division I Football Championship Subdivision (FCS) level as a member of the Southern Conference (SoCon). Samford's first football team was fielded in 1902. The team was known as the Howard Bulldogs through the 1965 season when Howard College was renamed as Samford University. Howard was located in Birmingham, Alabama prior to 1957. Since 1958, the Bulldogs have played their home games at Pete Hanna Stadium, which now has a seating capacity of 6,700, in Homewood. Chris Hatcher served as Samford's head coach from 2015 to 2025.

== History ==
=== Classifications ===
- 1937–1971: NA
- 1972: NCAA College Division
- 1973: NCAA Division III
- 1974–1983: no program
- 1984–1988: NCAA Division III
- 1989–present: NCAA Division I-AA/FCS

=== Conference memberships ===
- 1902–1905: independent
- 1906–1931: Southern Intercollegiate Athletic Association
- 1931–1954: Dixie Conference
- 1955–1972: independent
- 1973: NCAA Division III independent
- 1974–1983: no program
- 1984–1988: NCAA Division III independent
- 1989–2002: NCAA Division I-AA independent
- 2003–2007: Ohio Valley Conference
- 2008–present: Southern Conference

== Conference Championships ==
The Bulldogs have won 4 conference championships, with three coming in the Dixie Conference and two in the Southern Conference.

Season	Conference	Coach	Overall record	Conference record
1933	Dixie Conference	Eddie McLane	8–5	6–2
1935	Dixie Conference	Billy Bancroft	7–1–2	3–0–1
1936	Dixie Conference	Billy Bancroft	5–3–1	4–1–1
2013†	Southern Conference	Pat Sullivan	8–5	6–2
2022	Southern Conference	Chris Hatcher	11-2	8–0

† Co-champions

== NCAA Division I-AA/FCS playoff results ==
The Bulldogs have appeared in the NCAA Division I Football Championship playoffs six times with an overall record of 3–6.

Year	Round	Opponent	Result
1991	First Round; Quarterfinals; Semifinals	New Hampshire; James Madison; Youngstown State	W 29–13; W 24–21; L 0–10
1992	First Round	Delaware	L 21–56
2013	First Round	Jacksonville State (#20)	L 14–55
2016	First Round	Youngstown State (#13)	L 24–38
2017	First Round	Kennesaw State (#16)	L 17–28
2022	First Round; Second Round; Quarterfinals	BYE Week; Southeastern Louisiana (#17); North Dakota State (#3)	N/A; W 48–42 ^{OT} L 9–27

== Notable former players ==
- Bobby Bowden
- James Bradberry
- Cortland Finnegan
- Jimbo Fisher
- Scott Fountain
- Jeremy Towns
- Ahmad Gooden
- Efrem Hill
- Devlin Hodges
- Chris Oladokun
- Michael Pierce
- Nate Schenker
- Jaquiski Tartt
- Montrell Washington
- Corey White
- Nick Williams

== Future non-conference opponents ==
Announced schedules as of January 23, 2026.

2026	2027	2028	2029
vs North Alabama (Huntsville, AL)	at Georgia Southern	vs Austin Peay	at Southern Illinois
Southern Illinois	at UAB		
at UAB			
at Auburn			
