= 1991 Brown Bears football team =

American college football season

1991 Brown Bears football
- Conference: Ivy League
- Record: 1–9 (1–6 Ivy)
- Head coach: Mickey Kwiatkowski (2nd season)
- Offensive coordinator: Dave Barton (1st season)
- Defensive coordinator: Jim Bernhardt (2nd season)
- Captains: Jason Pankau; Rodd Torbert
- Home stadium: Brown Stadium

1991 Ivy League football standings
	Conf.					Overall
Team	W		L		T	W		L		T
Dartmouth $	6	–	0	–	1	7	–	2	–	1
Princeton	5	–	2	–	0	8	–	2	–	0
Harvard	4	–	2	–	1	4	–	5	–	1
Yale	4	–	3	–	0	6	–	4	–	0
Cornell	4	–	3	–	0	5	–	5	–	0
Penn	2	–	5	–	0	2	–	8	–	0
Brown	1	–	6	–	0	1	–	9	–	0
Columbia	1	–	6	–	0	1	–	9	–	0
$ – Conference champion

The 1991 Brown Bears football team was an American football team that represented Brown University during the 1991 NCAA Division I-AA football season. Brown tied for last in the Ivy League.

In their second season under head coach Mickey Kwiatkowski, the Bears compiled a 1–9 record and were outscored 372 to 227. Jason Pankau and Rodd Torbert were the team captains.

The Bears' 1–6 conference record tied for seventh (and worst) in the Ivy League standings. They were outscored 246 to 163 by Ivy opponents. Brown's only win was in the final week of the year, against fellow cellar-dweller Columbia.

Brown played its home games at Brown Stadium in Providence, Rhode Island.

== Schedule ==
Date	Opponent	Site	Result	Attendance	Source
September 21	at Yale	Yale Bowl; New Haven, CT	L 20–36	11,197	
September 28	at No. 20 Marshall*	Marshall University Stadium; Huntington, WV	L 0–46	22,223	
October 5	Rhode Island*	Brown Stadium; Providence, RI (rivalry)	L 36–38	8,200	
October 12	Princeton	Brown Stadium; Providence, RI	L 37–59	10,300	
October 19	at No. 3 Holy Cross*	Fitton Field; Worcester, MA	L 28–42	15,481	
October 26	at Penn	Franklin Field; Philadelphia, PA	L 19–28	22,208	
November 2	Cornell^{†}	Brown Stadium; Providence, RI	L 17–20	6,000	
November 9	Harvard	Brown Stadium; Providence, RI	L 29–35	5,750	
November 16	at Dartmouth	Memorial Field; Hanover, NH	L 13–45	6,111	
November 23	Columbia	Brown Stadium; Providence, RI	W 28–23	5,250	
*Non-conference game; ^{†}Homecoming; Rankings from NCAA Division I-AA Football Committee Poll released prior to the game
