= 1991 Arkansas State Indians football team =

American college football season

1991 Arkansas State Indians football
- Conference: Independent
- Record: 1–10
- Head coach: Al Kincaid (2nd season)
- Offensive coordinator: Keith Daniels (2nd season)
- Defensive coordinator: Pat Collins (2nd season)
- Home stadium: Indian Stadium

1991 NCAA Division I-AA independents football standings
	Conf.			Overall
Team	W	L	T	W		L		T
No. 10 Samford ^		–		12	–	2	–	0
No. 16 James Madison ^		–		9	–	4	–	0
No. 13 Youngstown State ^		–		12	–	3	–	0
Georgia Southern		–		7	–	4	–	0
UCF		–		6	–	5	–	0
William & Mary		–		5	–	6	–	0
Liberty		–		4	–	7	–	0
Northeastern		–		4	–	7	–	0
Western Kentucky		–		3	–	8	–	0
Arkansas State		–		1	–	10	–	0
Towson State		–		1	–	10	–	0
^ – NCAA Division I-AA playoff participant; Rankings from NCAA Division I-AA Football Committee poll

The 1991 Arkansas State Indians football team represented Arkansas State University as an independent the 1991 NCAA Division I-AA football season. Led by second-year head coach Al Kincaid, the Indians compiled a record of 1–10.

== Schedule ==
Date	Time	Opponent	Site	Result	Attendance	Source
August 31		at Colorado State	Hughes Stadium; Fort Collins, CO	L 24–38	27,482	
September 7		Northwestern State	Indian Stadium; Jonesboro, AR	L 3–28	20,000	
September 14	6:30 p.m.	at Northern Illinois	Huskie Stadium; DeKalb, IL	L 21–22	14,583	
September 21		at Memphis State	Liberty Bowl Memorial Stadium; Memphis, TN (Paint Bucket Bowl)	L 21–31	38,452	
September 28		Louisiana Tech	Indian Stadium; Jonesboro, AR	L 10–42	16,385	
October 5		UCF	Indian Stadium; Jonesboro, AR	L 20–31	18,200	
October 12	7:00 p.m.	at LSU	Tiger Stadium; Baton Rouge, LA	L 14–70	62,024	
October 19		at Akron	Rubber Bowl; Akron, OH	L 23–28	2,530	
October 26		No. 18 Southwest Missouri State^{†}	Indian Stadium; Jonesboro, AR	L 20–37	16,088	
November 9		Troy State	Indian Stadium; Jonesboro, AR	W 20–17	16,015	
November 16		Southwestern Louisiana	Indian Stadium; Jonesboro, AR	L 13–17	16,503	
^{†}Homecoming; Rankings from NCAA Division I-AA Football Committee Poll released prior to the game; All times are in Central time

== Roster ==
1991 Arkansas State Indians football team roster
Players			Coaches
Offense: Pos. / # / Name / Class; QB / 15 / Tom Sears / So	Defense: Pos. / # / Name / Class	Special teams: Pos. / # / Name / Class	Head coach: Al Kincaid; Coordinators/assistant coaches Legend: (C) Team captain; (S) Suspended; (I) Ineligible; Injured; Redshirt
