= 1991 Harvard Crimson football team =

American college football season

1991 Harvard Crimson football
- Conference: Ivy League
- Record: 4–5–1 (4–2–1 Ivy)
- Head coach: Joe Restic (21st season)
- Captain: John Lausch
- Home stadium: Harvard Stadium

1991 Ivy League football standings
	Conf.					Overall
Team	W		L		T	W		L		T
Dartmouth $	6	–	0	–	1	7	–	2	–	1
Princeton	5	–	2	–	0	8	–	2	–	0
Harvard	4	–	2	–	1	4	–	5	–	1
Yale	4	–	3	–	0	6	–	4	–	0
Cornell	4	–	3	–	0	5	–	5	–	0
Penn	2	–	5	–	0	2	–	8	–	0
Brown	1	–	6	–	0	1	–	9	–	0
Columbia	1	–	6	–	0	1	–	9	–	0
$ – Conference champion

The 1991 Harvard Crimson football team was an American football team that represented Harvard University during the 1991 NCAA Division I-AA football season. Harvard finished third in the Ivy League.

In their 21st year under head coach Joe Restic, the Crimson compiled a 4–5–1 record and were outscored 223 to 203. John Lausch was the team captain.

Harvard's 4–2–1 conference record placed third in the Ivy League standings. The Crimson outscored Ivy opponents 163 to 160.

Harvard played its home games at Harvard Stadium in the Allston neighborhood of Boston, Massachusetts.

== Schedule ==
Date	Opponent	Site	Result	Attendance	Source
September 21	Columbia	Harvard Stadium; Boston, MA	W 21–16	12,200	
September 28	at Army*	Michie Stadium; West Point, NY	L 20–21	35,881	
October 5	No. 7 Holy Cross*	Harvard Stadium; Boston, MA	L 13–28	16,225	
October 12	at Fordham*	Coffey Field; Bronx, NY	L 7–14	5,762	
October 19	at Cornell	Schoellkopf Field; Ithaca, NY	L 17–22	12,500	
October 26	Princeton	Harvard Stadium; Boston, MA (rivalry)	W 24–21	21,506	
November 2	Dartmouth	Harvard Stadium; Boston, MA (rivalry)	T 31–31	19,638	
November 9	at Brown	Brown Stadium; Providence, RI	W 35–29	5,750	
November 16	Penn	Harvard Stadium; Boston, MA (rivalry)	W 22–18	9,577	
November 23	at Yale	Yale Bowl; New Haven, CT (The Game)	L 13–23	40,091	
*Non-conference game; Rankings from NCAA Division I-AA Football Committee Poll released prior to the game
