= 1991 Samford Bulldogs football team =

American college football season

1991 Samford Bulldogs football

NCAA Division I-AA Semifinal, L 0–10 at Youngstown State
- Conference: Independent
- Record: 12–2
- Head coach: Terry Bowden (5th season)
- Offensive coordinator: Jimbo Fisher (1st season)
- Defensive coordinator: Jack Hines (5th season)
- Home stadium: Seibert Stadium

1991 NCAA Division I-AA independents football standings
	Conf.			Overall
Team	W	L	T	W		L		T
No. 10 Samford ^		–		12	–	2	–	0
No. 16 James Madison ^		–		9	–	4	–	0
No. 13 Youngstown State ^		–		12	–	3	–	0
Georgia Southern		–		7	–	4	–	0
UCF		–		6	–	5	–	0
William & Mary		–		5	–	6	–	0
Liberty		–		4	–	7	–	0
Northeastern		–		4	–	7	–	0
Western Kentucky		–		3	–	8	–	0
Arkansas State		–		1	–	10	–	0
Towson State		–		1	–	10	–	0
^ – NCAA Division I-AA playoff participant; Rankings from NCAA Division I-AA Football Committee poll

The 1991 Samford Bulldogs football team represented Samford University as an independent during the 1991 NCAA Division I-AA football season. Led by fifth-year head coach Terry Bowden, the Bulldogs compiled an overall record of 12–2. Samford advanced to the NCAA Division I-AA Semifinal and were defeated by Youngstown State.

== Schedule ==
Date	Opponent	Rank	Site	Result	Attendance	Source
August 31	Harding		Seibert Stadium; Homewood, AL	W 34–0		
September 7	Morehead State		Seibert Stadium; Homewood, AL	W 52–14		
September 14	at East Tennessee State		Memorial Center; Johnson City, TN	W 31–6	3,207	
September 21	Tennessee Tech		Seibert Stadium; Homewood, AL	W 20–16		
October 5	at Southeast Missouri State		Houck Stadium; Cape Girardeau, MO	W 48–24		
October 12	at UCF		Florida Citrus Bowl; Orlando, FL	W 13–6	12,011	
October 19	at No. 11 Alabama State	No. 19	Cramton Bowl; Montgomery, AL	L 28–31		
October 26	at Western Carolina		E. J. Whitmire Stadium; Cullowhee, NC	W 16–3		
November 2	Troy State	No. 18	Seibert Stadium; Homewood, AL	W 24–22	7,131	
November 16	at William & Mary	No. 14	Zable Stadium; Williamsburg, VA	W 35–13	7,131	
November 23	Liberty	No. 11	Seibert Stadium; Homewood, AL	W 31–19		
November 30	at No. 11 New Hampshire	No. 10	Cowell Stadium; Durham, NH (NCAA Division I-AA First Round)	W 29–13		
December 7	at No. 16 James Madison	No. 10	Bridgeforth Stadium; Harrisonburg, VA (NCAA Division I-AA Quarterfinal)	W 24–21	9,028	
December 14	at No. 13 Youngstown State	No. 10	Stambaugh Stadium; Youngstown, OH (NCAA Division I-AA Semifinal)	L 0–10	17,033	
Rankings from NCAA Division I-AA Football Committee Poll released prior to the game
