= 1991 NCAA Division I-AA Football Championship Game =

College football game

1991 NCAA Division I-AA Football Championship
- I-AA National Championship Game
Youngstown State Penguins	Marshall Thundering Herd
(11–3)	(11–3)
Independent	SoCon
25	17
Head coach: Jim Tressel	Head coach: Jim Donnan
NCAA / Seed; 13 / —	NCAA / Seed; 8 / —
	1	2	3	4	Total
Youngstown State	0	3	3	19	25
Marshall	0	0	17	0	17
- Date: December 21, 1991
- Season: 1991
- Stadium: Paulson Stadium
- Location: Statesboro, Georgia
- Attendance: 12,667

United States TV coverage
- Network: CBS Sports
- Announcers: Brad Nessler (play-by-play), Dan Jiggetts (color)

The 1991 NCAA Division I-AA Football Championship Game was a postseason college football game between the Youngstown State Penguins and the Marshall Thundering Herd. The game was played on December 21, 1991, at Paulson Stadium in Statesboro, Georgia. The culminating game of the 1991 NCAA Division I-AA football season, it was won by Youngstown State, 25–17.

== Teams ==
The participants of the Championship Game were the finalists of the 1991 I-AA Playoffs, which began with a 16-team bracket. The location of the final, the Georgia Southern Eagles' Paulson Stadium, had been predetermined via a three-year agreement the university reached with the NCAA in February 1989.

=== Youngstown State Penguins ===
Youngstown State finished their regular season with an 8–3 record. Unseeded in the tournament and ranked 13th in the final NCAA I-AA in-house poll, the Penguins defeated Villanova, top-seed Nevada, and Samford to reach the final. This was the first appearance for Youngstown State in a Division I-AA championship game.

=== Marshall Thundering Herd ===
Marshall also finished their regular season with an 8–3 record (5–2 in conference). Unseeded and ranked eighth in the final NCAA I-AA in-house poll, the Thundering Herd defeated Western Illinois, third-seed Northern Iowa, and second-seed Eastern Kentucky to reach the final. This was the second appearance for Marshall in a Division I-AA championship game, having lost in 1987.

== Game summary ==
After a low-scoring first half, Youngstown State held a 3–0 lead at halftime. Marshall then scored all of their points in the third quarter, taking a 17–6 lead. Youngstown State rallied for three touchdowns in the fourth quarter, and a 25–17 win.

=== Scoring summary ===
Scoring summary

Quarter	Time	Drive			Team	Scoring information	Score	
Quarter	Time	Plays	Yards	TOP	Team	Scoring information	YSU	MU
2					YSU	23-yard field goal by Jeff Wilkins	3	0
3	10:14				MU	Troy Brown 13-yard touchdown reception from Michael Payton, Dewey Klein kick good	3	7
3					MU	Ricardo Clark 13-yard touchdown reception from Payton, Klein kick good	3	14
3					YSU	37-yard field goal by Wilkins	6	14
3	0:00				MU	42-yard field goal by Klein	6	17
4					YSU	Herb Williams 33-yard touchdown reception from Ray Isaac, 2-point pass failed	12	17
4	7:09	8	80		YSU	Ryan Wood 3-yard touchdown run, 2-point run failed	18	17
4		3	14		YSU	Tamron Smith 5-yard touchdown run, Wilkins kick good	25	17
"TOP" = time of possession. For other American football terms, see Glossary of American football.							25	17

=== Game statistics ===
	1	2	3	4	Total
Penguins	0	3	3	19	25
Thundering Herd	0	0	17	0	17

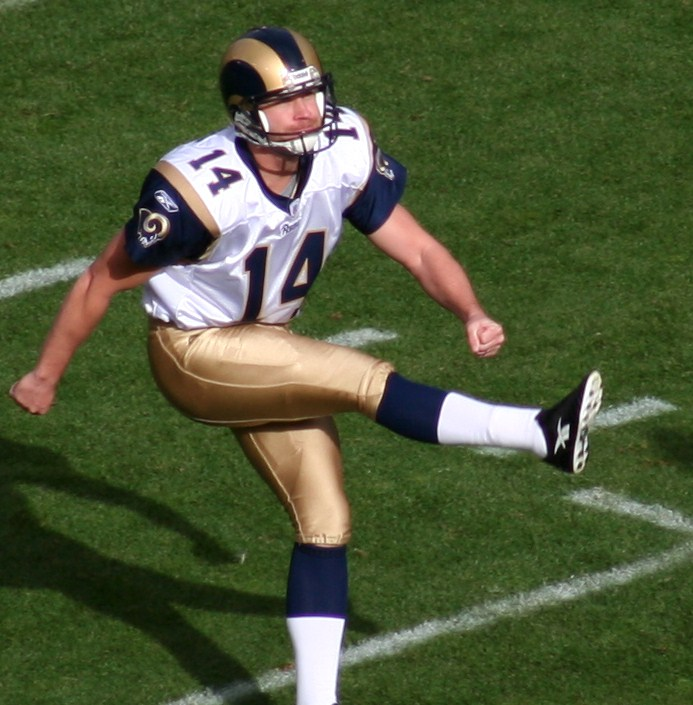
Youngstown State kicker Jeff Wilkins

Statistics	YSU	MU
First downs	16	22
Plays–yards	65–319	85–412
Rushes–yards	50–121	42–49
Passing yards	198	363
Passing: comp–att–int	9–15–0	30–43–2
Time of possession	32:35	27:25

Team	Category	Player	Statistics
Youngstown State	Passing	Ray Isaac	9–15, 198 yds, 1 TD
Youngstown State	Rushing	Tamron Smith	30 car, 88 yds, 1 TD
Youngstown State	Receiving	Andre Ballinger	4 rec, 89 yds
Marshall	Passing	Michael Payton	30–43, 363 yds, 2 TD, 2 INT
Marshall	Rushing	Glenn Pedro	13 car, 50 yds
Marshall	Receiving	Ricardo Clark	8 rec, 154 yds, 1 TD
