= Ray Isaac (American football) =

American football quarterback

No. 9
- Position: Quarterback

Personal information
- Listed height: 6 ft 0 in (1.83 m)
- Listed weight: 180 lb (82 kg)

Career information
- High school: Rayen (Youngstown, Ohio)
- College: Youngstown State (1988–1991)
- NFL draft: 1992: undrafted

Career history
- Calgary Stampeders (1992)*; Cleveland Thunderbolts (1993); Charlotte Rage (1995)*; Memphis Pharaohs (1995); Florida Bobcats (1996); Charleston Swamp Foxes (2000–2002); Florida Frenzy (2006)
- * Offseason or practice squad member only

Awards and highlights
- NCAA Division I-AA national champion (1991)

Career AFL statistics
- Comp. / Att.: 53 / 129
- Passing yards: 728
- TD–INT: 6–7
- Passer rating: 48.85
- Rushing TDs: 3
- Stats at ArenaFan.com

Ray Isaac is an American former professional football quarterback who played one season with the Cleveland Thunderbolts of the Arena Football League (AFL). He played college football at Youngstown State University, helping the Youngstown State Penguins win the national championship in 1991.

== Early life and college ==
Isaac attended Rayen High School in Youngstown, Ohio. He was a four-year letterman for the Youngstown State Penguins of Youngstown State University from 1988 to 1991. He was a three-year starter. As a senior in 1991, he led Youngstown State to the 1991 NCAA Division I-AA Football Championship Game, where he completed nine of 15 passes for 198 yards and one touchdown in a 25–17 victory over the Marshall Thundering Herd. Isaac ran an option offense while at Youngstown State.

== Professional career ==
After going undrafted in the 1992 NFL draft, Isaac signed with the Calgary Stampeders of the Canadian Football League in May 1992. He was released on June 18, 1992.

On May 5, 1993, it was reported that Isaac had signed with the Cleveland Thunderbolts of the Arena Football League (AFL). He began the season as the backup to Greg Frey. Overall, Isaac played in all 12 games for the Thunderbolts during the 1993 season, completing 53 of 129 passes (41.1%) for 728 yards, six touchdowns, and seven interceptions while also rushing 15 times for 14 yards and three touchdowns. He was waived in January 1994.

Isaac signed with the Charlotte Rage of the AFL for the 1995 season, but was later waived.

In April 1995, he was claimed off waivers by the Memphis Pharaohs. He was deactivated before the start of the season in May 1995. He was the third-string quarterback during the 1995 season. On July 2, 1995, he was arrested and charged with federal jury tampering after being accused of influencing a juror from Youngstown in the 1994 trial of Michael Monus, who owned the Youngstown Pride of the World Basketball League. Isaac was released by the Pharaohs on July 5, 1995, after the team signed Brad Lebo. Isaac signed with the AFL's Florida Bobcats in early April 1996. On April 23, 1996, he was placed on injured reserve. On August 5, 1996, Isaac pleaded guilty to obstruction of justice for offering a bribe in the 1994 Monus trial. It was also later revealed that Isaac had received $10,000 from Monus while at Youngstown State. Monus was the chairman of Youngstown State's board of trustees.

Isaac played for the Charleston Swamp Foxes of the af2 from 2000 to 2002. He later played for the Florida Frenzy of the National Indoor Football League in 2006.

== Personal life ==
Isaac ran for Youngstown city council in 1995 but was not elected. He has also spent time as a high school football coach.
