= 1991 Columbia Lions football team =

American college football season

1991 Columbia Lions football
- Conference: Ivy League
- Record: 1–9 (1–6 Ivy)
- Head coach: Ray Tellier (3rd season)
- Captains: Chuck Dimitrof; Brad Hutton
- Home stadium: Wien Stadium

1991 Ivy League football standings
	Conf.					Overall
Team	W		L		T	W		L		T
Dartmouth $	6	–	0	–	1	7	–	2	–	1
Princeton	5	–	2	–	0	8	–	2	–	0
Harvard	4	–	2	–	1	4	–	5	–	1
Yale	4	–	3	–	0	6	–	4	–	0
Cornell	4	–	3	–	0	5	–	5	–	0
Penn	2	–	5	–	0	2	–	8	–	0
Brown	1	–	6	–	0	1	–	9	–	0
Columbia	1	–	6	–	0	1	–	9	–	0
$ – Conference champion

The 1991 Columbia Lions football team was an American football team that represented Columbia University during the 1991 NCAA Division I-AA football season. Columbia tied for last in the Ivy League.

In their third season under head coach Ray Tellier, the Lions compiled a 1–9 record and were outscored 249 to 154. Chuck Dimitrof and Brad Hutton were the team captains.

The Lions' 1–6 conference record tied for seventh (and worst) in the Ivy League standings. Columbia was outscored 177 to 114 by Ivy opponents.

Columbia played its homes games at Lawrence A. Wien Stadium in Upper Manhattan, in New York City.

== Schedule ==
Date	Opponent	Site	Result	Attendance	Source
September 21	Harvard	Harvard Stadium; Allston, MA	L 16–21	12,200	
September 28	Lehigh*	Wien Stadium; New York, NY	L 9–22	4,045	
October 5	Fordham*	Wien Stadium; New York, NY (rivalry)	L 16–20	3,650	
October 12	Penn^{†}	Wien Stadium; New York, NY	W 20–14	7,870	
October 19	at Lafayette*	Fisher Field; Easton, PA	L 15–30	5,113	
October 26	Yale	Wien Stadium; New York, NY	L 9–36	9,130	
November 2	at Princeton	Palmer Stadium; Princeton, NJ	L 6–22	8,428	
November 9	Dartmouth	Wien Stadium; New York, NY	L 19–28	4,335	
November 16	at Cornell	Schoellkopf Field; Ithaca, NY (rivalry)	L 21–28	6,000	
November 23	at Brown	Brown Stadium; Providence, RI	L 23–28	5,250	
*Non-conference game; ^{†}Homecoming
