= 1991 James Madison Dukes football team =

American college football season

1991 James Madison Dukes football

NCAA Division I-AA Quarterfinal, L 21–24 vs. Samford
- Conference: Independent
- Record: 9–4
- Head coach: Rip Scherer (1st season)
- Home stadium: Bridgeforth Stadium

1991 NCAA Division I-AA independents football standings
	Conf.			Overall
Team	W	L	T	W		L		T
No. 10 Samford ^		–		12	–	2	–	0
No. 16 James Madison ^		–		9	–	4	–	0
No. 13 Youngstown State ^		–		12	–	3	–	0
Georgia Southern		–		7	–	4	–	0
UCF		–		6	–	5	–	0
William & Mary		–		5	–	6	–	0
Liberty		–		4	–	7	–	0
Northeastern		–		4	–	7	–	0
Western Kentucky		–		3	–	8	–	0
Arkansas State		–		1	–	10	–	0
Towson State		–		1	–	10	–	0
^ – NCAA Division I-AA playoff participant; Rankings from NCAA Division I-AA Football Committee poll

The 1991 James Madison Dukes football team represented James Madison University as an independent during the 1991 NCAA Division I-AA football season. Led by first-year head coach Rip Scherer, the Duke played their home games at Bridgeforth Stadium in Harrisonburg, Virginia. James Madison finished the season with an overall record of 9–4. They qualified for the NCAA Division I-AA Football Championship playoffs, beating Delaware in the first round before falling to Samford in the quarterfinals.

== Schedule ==
Date	Opponent	Rank	Site	Result	Attendance	Source
August 31	at Virginia Tech		Lane Stadium; Blacksburg, VA	L 12–41	41,623	
September 7	UCF		Bridgeforth Stadium; Harrisonburg, VA	W 49–31	10,081	
September 21	at No. 19 Appalachian State		Kidd Brewer Stadium; Boone, NC	W 31–8	13,467	
September 28	at William & Mary		Cary Field; Williamsburg, VA	W 29–28	15,371	
October 5	UMass	No. 17	Bridgeforth Stadium; Harrisonburg, VA	W 24–7	15,104	
October 12	Towson State	No. T–11	Bridgeforth Stadium; Harrisonburg, VA	W 55–31		
October 19	Georgia Southern	No. 10	Bridgeforth Stadium; Harrisonburg, VA	L 21–24	12,119	
October 26	Richmond	No. 17	Bridgeforth Stadium; Harrisonburg, VA	W 47–42	13,369	
November 2	at Liberty	No. 14	Liberty University Stadium; Lynchburg, VA	W 35–34		
November 9	at Youngstown State	No. 12	Stambaugh Stadium; Youngstown, OH	L 21–28		
November 23	at Northeastern	No. 17	Parsons Field; Brookline, MA	W 24–16		
November 30	at No. 6 Delaware	No. 16	Delaware Stadium; Newark, DE (NCAA Division I-AA First Round)	W 42–35 ^{2OT}		
December 7	No. 10 Samford	No. 16	Bridgeforth Stadium; Harrisonburg, VA (NCAA Division I-AA Quarterfinal)	L 21–24	9,028	
Rankings from NCAA Division I-AA Football Committee Poll released prior to the game
