= 1991 UCF Knights football team =

American college football season

1991 UCF Knights football
- Conference: Independent
- Record: 6–5
- Head coach: Gene McDowell (7th season)
- Offensive coordinator: Mike Kruczek (7th season)
- Defensive coordinator: Don Pollard (2nd season)
- Home stadium: Florida Citrus Bowl

1991 NCAA Division I-AA independents football standings
	Conf.			Overall
Team	W	L	T	W		L		T
No. 10 Samford ^		–		12	–	2	–	0
No. 16 James Madison ^		–		9	–	4	–	0
No. 13 Youngstown State ^		–		12	–	3	–	0
Georgia Southern		–		7	–	4	–	0
UCF		–		6	–	5	–	0
William & Mary		–		5	–	6	–	0
Liberty		–		4	–	7	–	0
Northeastern		–		4	–	7	–	0
Western Kentucky		–		3	–	8	–	0
Arkansas State		–		1	–	10	–	0
Towson State		–		1	–	10	–	0
^ – NCAA Division I-AA playoff participant; Rankings from NCAA Division I-AA Football Committee poll

The 1991 UCF Knights football season was the thirteenth season for the team and Gene McDowell's seventh as the head coach of the Knights. McDowell led the team to an overall record of 6–5.

== Schedule ==
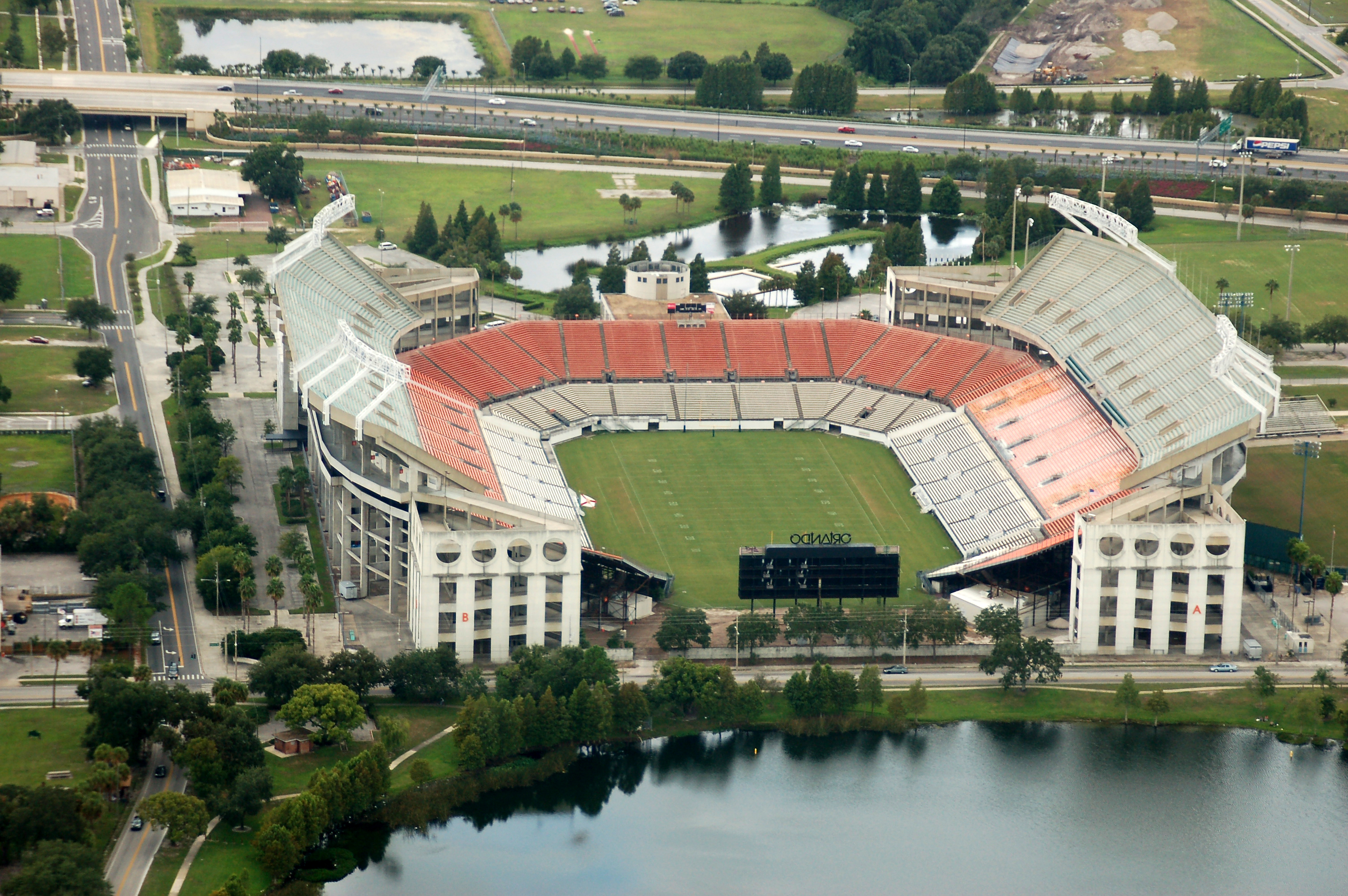
The Florida Citrus Bowl, the Knights' home field

Date	Opponent	Rank	Site	Result	Attendance	Source
August 31	Troy State	No. 11	Florida Citrus Bowl; Orlando, FL	W 21–10	18,586	
September 7	at James Madison	No. 11	Bridgeforth Stadium; Harrisonburg, VA	L 31–49	10,081	
September 14	at Valdosta State		Cleveland Field; Valdosta, GA	W 12–0	6,379	
September 21	East Carolina		Florida Citrus Bowl; Orlando, FL	L 25–47	20,049	
September 28	Bethune–Cookman		Florida Citrus Bowl; Orlando, FL	W 32–6	16,066	
October 5	at Arkansas State		Indian Stadium; Jonesboro, AR	W 31–20	18,200	
October 12	Samford		Florida Citrus Bowl; Orlando, FL	L 6–13	12,011	
October 26	at Georgia Southern		Paulson Stadium; Statesboro, GA	L 6–20	19,063	
November 2	Savannah State		Florida Citrus Bowl; Orlando, FL	L 31–33	13,188	
November 9	at Liberty		Liberty University Stadium; Lynchburg, VA	W 31–26	2,650	
November 16	Millersville		Florida Citrus Bowl; Orlando, FL	W 52–6	10,027	
Rankings from NCAA Division I-AA Football Committee Poll released prior to the game

== After the season ==
=== NFL draft ===
The following Knight was selected in the 1992 NFL draft following the season.

Round	Pick	Player	Position	NFL team
3	66	Bob Spitulski	Linebacker	Seattle Seahawks
