= 1991 Penn Quakers football team =

American college football season

1991 Penn Quakers football
- Conference: Ivy League
- Record: 2–8 (2–5 Ivy)
- Head coach: Gary Steele (3rd season)
- Home stadium: Franklin Field

1991 Ivy League football standings
	Conf.					Overall
Team	W		L		T	W		L		T
Dartmouth $	6	–	0	–	1	7	–	2	–	1
Princeton	5	–	2	–	0	8	–	2	–	0
Harvard	4	–	2	–	1	4	–	5	–	1
Yale	4	–	3	–	0	6	–	4	–	0
Cornell	4	–	3	–	0	5	–	5	–	0
Penn	2	–	5	–	0	2	–	8	–	0
Brown	1	–	6	–	0	1	–	9	–	0
Columbia	1	–	6	–	0	1	–	9	–	0
$ – Conference champion

The 1991 Penn Quakers football team represented the University of Pennsylvania in the 1991 NCAA Division I-AA football season.

== Schedule ==
Date	Opponent	Site	Result	Attendance	Source
September 21	Dartmouth	Franklin Field; Philadelphia, PA	L 15–21	17,624	
September 28	at Holy Cross*	Fitton Field; Worcester, MA	L 0–45	11,591	
October 5	Lafayette*	Franklin Field; Philadelphia, PA	L 12–20	8,712	
October 12	at Columbia	Wien Stadium; New York, NY	L 14–20	7,870	
October 19	at Lehigh*	Goodman Stadium; Bethlehem, PA	L 17–28	10,394	
October 26	Brown	Franklin Field; Philadelphia, PA	W 28–19	22,208	
November 2	at Yale	Yale Bowl; New Haven, CT	L 12–31	12,580	
November 9	Princeton	Franklin Field; Philadelphia, PA (rivalry)	L 12–17	25,617	
November 16	at Harvard	Harvard Stadium; Boston, MA (rivalry)	L 18–22	9,577	
November 23	Cornell	Franklin Field; Philadelphia, PA (rivalry)	W 14–13	10,210	
*Non-conference game
