= 1991 Dartmouth Big Green football team =

American college football season

1991 Dartmouth Big Green football

Ivy League champion
- Conference: Ivy League
- Record: 7–2–1 (6–0–1 Ivy)
- Head coach: Buddy Teevens (5th season)
- Defensive coordinator: John Lyons (4th season)
- Home stadium: Memorial Field

1991 Ivy League football standings
	Conf.					Overall
Team	W		L		T	W		L		T
Dartmouth $	6	–	0	–	1	7	–	2	–	1
Princeton	5	–	2	–	0	8	–	2	–	0
Harvard	4	–	2	–	1	4	–	5	–	1
Yale	4	–	3	–	0	6	–	4	–	0
Cornell	4	–	3	–	0	5	–	5	–	0
Penn	2	–	5	–	0	2	–	8	–	0
Brown	1	–	6	–	0	1	–	9	–	0
Columbia	1	–	6	–	0	1	–	9	–	0
$ – Conference champion

The 1991 Dartmouth Big Green football team represented Dartmouth College in the 1991 NCAA Division I-AA football season.

== Schedule ==
Date	Opponent	Site	Result	Attendance	Source
September 21	at Penn	Franklin Field; Philadelphia, PA	W 21–15	17,624	
September 28	Bucknell*	Memorial Field; Hanover, NH	W 34–16	5,928	
October 5	at Lehigh*	Goodman Stadium; Bethlehem, PA	L 28–30	12,000	
October 12	Holy Cross*	Memorial Field; Hanover, NH	L 6–23	6,012	
October 19	at Yale	Yale Bowl; New Haven, CT	W 28–24	18,791	
October 26	Cornell	Memorial Field; Hanover, NH (rivalry)	W 31–25	9,526	
November 2	at Harvard	Harvard Stadium; Boston, MA (rivalry)	T 31–31	19,638	
November 9	at Columbia	Wien Stadium; New York, NY	W 28–19	4,335	
November 16	Brown	Memorial Field; Hanover, NH	W 45–13	6,111	
November 23	Princeton	Memorial Field; Hanover, NH	W 31–13	11,330	
*Non-conference game
