= 1991 Yale Bulldogs football team =

American college football season

1991 Yale Bulldogs football
- Conference: Ivy League
- Record: 6–4 (4–3 Ivy)
- Head coach: Carmen Cozza (27th season)
- Defensive coordinator: Don Brown (3rd season)
- Home stadium: Yale Bowl

1991 Ivy League football standings
	Conf.					Overall
Team	W		L		T	W		L		T
Dartmouth $	6	–	0	–	1	7	–	2	–	1
Princeton	5	–	2	–	0	8	–	2	–	0
Harvard	4	–	2	–	1	4	–	5	–	1
Yale	4	–	3	–	0	6	–	4	–	0
Cornell	4	–	3	–	0	5	–	5	–	0
Penn	2	–	5	–	0	2	–	8	–	0
Brown	1	–	6	–	0	1	–	9	–	0
Columbia	1	–	6	–	0	1	–	9	–	0
$ – Conference champion

The 1991 Yale Bulldogs football team represented Yale University in the 1991 NCAA Division I-AA football season. The Bulldogs were led by 27th-year head coach Carmen Cozza, played their home games at the Yale Bowl and finished tied for fourth place in the Ivy League with a 4–3 record, 6–4 overall.

== Schedule ==
Date	Opponent	Site	Result	Attendance	Source
September 21	Brown	Yale Bowl; New Haven, CT	W 36–20	11,197	
September 28	at Lafayette*	Fisher Field; Easton, PA	W 24–14	10,411	
October 5	Connecticut*	Yale Bowl; New Haven, CT	L 20–34	20,191	
October 12	at Colgate*	Andy Kerr Stadium; Hamilton, NY	W 25–7	4,500	
October 19	Dartmouth	Yale Bowl; New Haven, CT	L 24–28	18,791	
October 26	at Columbia	Wien Stadium; New York, NY	W 36–9	9,130	
November 2	Penn	Yale Bowl; New Haven, CT	W 31–12	12,580	
November 9	at Cornell	Schoellkopf Field; Ithaca, NY	L 6–31	9,000	
November 16	at Princeton	Palmer Stadium; Princeton, NJ (rivalry)	L 16–22	30,820	
November 23	Harvard	Yale Bowl; New Haven, CT (The Game)	W 23–13	40,091	
*Non-conference game
