= 1991 Cornell Big Red football team =

American college football season

1991 Cornell Big Red football
- Conference: Ivy League
- Record: 5–5 (4–3 Ivy)
- Head coach: Jim Hofher (2nd season)
- Captains: Mark Broderick; Greg Finnegan; Scott Oliaro
- Home stadium: Schoellkopf Field

1991 Ivy League football standings
	Conf.					Overall
Team	W		L		T	W		L		T
Dartmouth $	6	–	0	–	1	7	–	2	–	1
Princeton	5	–	2	–	0	8	–	2	–	0
Harvard	4	–	2	–	1	4	–	5	–	1
Yale	4	–	3	–	0	6	–	4	–	0
Cornell	4	–	3	–	0	5	–	5	–	0
Penn	2	–	5	–	0	2	–	8	–	0
Brown	1	–	6	–	0	1	–	9	–	0
Columbia	1	–	6	–	0	1	–	9	–	0
$ – Conference champion

The 1991 Cornell Big Red football team was an American football team that represented Cornell University during the 1991 NCAA Division I-AA football season. Cornell tied for fourth in the Ivy League.

In its second season under head coach Jim Hofher, the team compiled a 5–5 record and outscored opponents 218 to 181. Mark Broderick, Greg Finnegan and Scott Oliaro were the team captains.

Cornell's 4–3 conference record tied fourth in the Ivy League standings. The Big Red outscored Ivy opponents 139 to 124.

The Big Red entered the year ranked 20th in the national rankings, but dropped out of the top 20 after an opening-week loss and remained unranked through the end of the season.

Cornell played its home games at Schoellkopf Field in Ithaca, New York.

== Schedule ==
Date	Opponent	Site	Result	Attendance	Source
September 21	at Princeton	Palmer Stadium; Princeton, NJ	L 0–18	12,124	
September 28	Colgate*	Schoellkopf Field; Ithaca, NY (rivalry)	L 13–31	15,000	
October 5	at Bucknell*	Christy Mathewson–Memorial Stadium; Lewisburg, PA	W 23–7	6,551	
October 12	at Stanford*	Stanford Stadium; Stanford, CA	L 6–56	30,347	
October 19	Harvard^{†}	Schoellkopf Field; Ithaca, NY	W 22–17	12,500	
October 26	Dartmouth	Schoellkopf Field; Ithaca, NY (rivalry)	L 25–31	9,526	
November 2	at Brown	Brown Stadium; Providence, RI	W 20–7	6,000	
November 9	Yale	Schoellkopf Field; Ithaca, NY	W 31–6	9,000	
November 16	Columbia	Schoellkopf Field; Ithaca, NY (rivalry)	W 28–21	6,000	
November 23	at Penn	Franklin Field; Philadelphia, PA (rivalry)	L 13–14	10,210	
*Non-conference game; ^{†}Homecoming
