= 1991 Youngstown State Penguins football team =

American college football season

1991 Youngstown State Penguins football

NCAA Division I-AA champion

NCAA Division I-AA Championship Game, W 25–17 vs. Marshall
- Conference: Independent
- Record: 12–3
- Head coach: Jim Tressel (6th season)
- Offensive coordinator: Don Treadwell (1st season)
- Home stadium: Stambaugh Stadium

1991 NCAA Division I-AA independents football standings
	Conf.			Overall
Team	W	L	T	W		L		T
No. 10 Samford ^		–		12	–	2	–	0
No. 16 James Madison ^		–		9	–	4	–	0
No. 13 Youngstown State ^		–		12	–	3	–	0
Georgia Southern		–		7	–	4	–	0
UCF		–		6	–	5	–	0
William & Mary		–		5	–	6	–	0
Liberty		–		4	–	7	–	0
Northeastern		–		4	–	7	–	0
Western Kentucky		–		3	–	8	–	0
Arkansas State		–		1	–	10	–	0
Towson State		–		1	–	10	–	0
^ – NCAA Division I-AA playoff participant; Rankings from NCAA Division I-AA Football Committee poll

The 1991 Youngstown State Penguins football team represented Youngstown State University in the 1991 NCAA Division I-AA football season. The Penguins were led by sixth-year head coach Jim Tressel and played their home games at Stambaugh Stadium. They finished the season 12–3. They received an at-large bid to the I-AA playoffs, where they defeated Villanova, Nevada, and Samford to advance to the National Championship Game, where they defeated Marshall. This was their first national championship in school history.

== Schedule ==
Date	Opponent	Rank	Site	TV	Result	Attendance	Source
September 7	Edinboro	No. 9	Stambaugh Stadium; Youngstown, OH		W 24–0		
September 14	at Delaware State	No. 8	Alumni Stadium; Dover, DE		L 29–33		
September 21	Morgan State		Stambaugh Stadium; Youngstown, OH		W 57–22	9,313	
September 28	Northeastern		Stambaugh Stadium; Youngstown, OH		W 59–7		
October 5	at Stephen F. Austin		Homer Bryce Stadium; Nacogdoches, TX		W 16–9	8,212	
October 12	at Akron	No. 18	Rubber Bowl; Akron, OH (Steel Tire)		L 24–38	6,335	
October 19	Liberty^{†}		Stambaugh Stadium; Youngstown, OH		L 8–10		
November 2	at No. 20 Georgia Southern		Paulson Stadium; Statesboro, GA		W 19–17	16,461	
November 9	James Madison		Stambaugh Stadium; Youngstown, OH		W 28–21		
November 16	Slippery Rock	No. 16	Stambaugh Stadium; Youngstown, OH		W 40–21		
November 23	at Towson State	No. 14	Minnegan Stadium; Towson, MD		W 27–17	1,210	
November 30	No. 7 Villanova	No. 13	Stambaugh Stadium; Youngstown, OH (NCAA Division I-AA First Round)		W 17–16	9,556	
December 7	at No. 1 Nevada	No. 13	Mackay Stadium; Reno, NV (NCAA Division I-AA Quarterfinal)		W 30–28	13,476	
December 14	No. 10 Samford	No. 13	Stambaugh Stadium; Youngstown, OH (NCAA Division I-AA Semifinal)		W 10–0	17,033	
December 21	vs. No. 8 Marshall	No. 13	Paulson Stadium; Statesboro, GA (NCAA Division I-AA National Championship Game)	CBS	W 25–17	12,667	
^{†}Homecoming; Rankings from NCAA Division I-AA Football Committee Poll released prior to the game
