= 1991 William & Mary Tribe football team =

American college football season

1991 William & Mary Tribe football
- Conference: Independent
- Record: 5–6
- Head coach: Jimmye Laycock (12th season)
- Defensive coordinator: Joe Bottiglieri (1st season)
- Captains: Tom Dexter; Robert Green; Chris Hakel; Jeff Nielsen
- Home stadium: Zable Stadium

1991 NCAA Division I-AA independents football standings
	Conf.			Overall
Team	W	L	T	W		L		T
No. 10 Samford ^		–		12	–	2	–	0
No. 16 James Madison ^		–		9	–	4	–	0
No. 13 Youngstown State ^		–		12	–	3	–	0
Georgia Southern		–		7	–	4	–	0
UCF		–		6	–	5	–	0
William & Mary		–		5	–	6	–	0
Liberty		–		4	–	7	–	0
Northeastern		–		4	–	7	–	0
Western Kentucky		–		3	–	8	–	0
Arkansas State		–		1	–	10	–	0
Towson State		–		1	–	10	–	0
^ – NCAA Division I-AA playoff participant; Rankings from NCAA Division I-AA Football Committee poll

The 1991 William & Mary Tribe football team represented the College of William & Mary as an independent during the 1991 NCAA Division I-AA football season. Led by Jimmye Laycock in his 12th year as head coach, William & Mary finished the season with a record of 5–6.

== Schedule ==
Date	Opponent	Rank	Site	Result	Attendance	Source
September 7	at Boston University	No. 4	Nickerson Field; Boston, MA	W 48–22	3,630	
September 14	No. 12 Delaware	No. 3	Zable Stadium; Williamsburg, VA (rivalry)	L 21–28	13,579	
September 21	at Navy	No. 11	Navy–Marine Corps Memorial Stadium; Annapolis, MD	W 26–21	23,697	
September 28	James Madison	No. 9	Zable Stadium; Williamsburg, VA (Dukes)	L 28–29	15,371	
October 5	at North Carolina	No. T–20	Kenan Memorial Stadium; Chapel Hill, NC	L 36–59	44,500	
October 12	at VMI		Alumni Memorial Field; Lexington, VA (rivalry)	W 40–26	7,737	
October 19	The Citadel		Zable Stadium; Williamsburg, VA	W 24–17	15,621–16,621	
October 26	at No. T–12 Villanova		Villanova Stadium; Villanova, PA	L 21–35	6,887	
November 2	at No. 20 Lehigh		Goodman Stadium; Bethlehem, PA	L 37–41	11,083	
November 16	No. 14 Samford		Zable Stadium; Williamsburg, VA	L 13–35	7,131	
November 23	Richmond		Zable Stadium; Williamsburg, VA (I-64 Bowl)	W 49–7	12,216	
Rankings from NCAA Division I-AA Football Committee Poll released prior to the game
