= 1991 Princeton Tigers football team =

American college football season

1991 Princeton Tigers football
- Conference: Ivy League
- Record: 8–2 (5–2 Ivy)
- Head coach: Steve Tosches (5th season)
- Defensive coordinator: Mark Harriman (3rd season)
- Captain: Jim Freeman
- Home stadium: Palmer Stadium

1991 Ivy League football standings
	Conf.					Overall
Team	W		L		T	W		L		T
Dartmouth $	6	–	0	–	1	7	–	2	–	1
Princeton	5	–	2	–	0	8	–	2	–	0
Harvard	4	–	2	–	1	4	–	5	–	1
Yale	4	–	3	–	0	6	–	4	–	0
Cornell	4	–	3	–	0	5	–	5	–	0
Penn	2	–	5	–	0	2	–	8	–	0
Brown	1	–	6	–	0	1	–	9	–	0
Columbia	1	–	6	–	0	1	–	9	–	0
$ – Conference champion

The 1991 Princeton Tigers football team was an American football team that represented Princeton University during the 1991 NCAA Division I-AA football season. Princeton finished second in the Ivy League.

In their fifth year under head coach Steve Tosches, the Tigers compiled an 8–2 record and outscored opponents 253 to 171. Jim Freeman was the team captain.

Princeton's 5–2 conference record placed second in the Ivy League standings. The Tigers outscored Ivy opponents 172 to 126.

Princeton played its home games at Palmer Stadium on the university campus in Princeton, New Jersey.

== Schedule ==
Date	Opponent	Site	Result	Attendance	Source
September 21	Cornell	Palmer Stadium; Princeton, NJ	W 18–0	12,124	
September 28	at Fordham*	Coffey Field; Bronx, NY	W 20–17	3,742	
October 5	Colgate*	Palmer Stadium; Princeton, NJ	W 30–21	10,842	
October 12	at Brown	Brown Stadium; Providence, RI	W 59–37	10,300	
October 19	Bucknell*	Palmer Stadium; Princeton, NJ	W 31–7	10,736	
October 26	at Harvard	Harvard Stadium; Boston, MA (rivalry)	L 21–24	21,506	
November 2	Columbia	Palmer Stadium; Princeton, NJ	W 22–6	8,428	
November 9	at Penn	Franklin Field; Philadelphia, PA (rivalry)	W 17–12	25,617	
November 16	Yale	Palmer Stadium; Princeton, NJ (rivalry)	W 22–16	30,820	
November 23	at Dartmouth	Memorial Field; Hanover, NH	L 13–31	11,330	
*Non-conference game
