= 1991 Villanova Wildcats football team =

American college football season

1991 Villanova Wildcats football

Yankee co-champion

NCAA Division I-AA First Round, L 16–17 at Youngstown State
- Conference: Yankee Conference
- Record: 10–2 (7–1 Yankee)
- Head coach: Andy Talley (7th season)
- Defensive coordinator: Dan MacNeill (4th season)
- Home stadium: Villanova Stadium

1991 Yankee Conference football standings
	Conf.					Overall
Team	W		L		T	W		L		T
No. 6 Delaware +^	7	–	1	–	0	10	–	2	–	0
No. 7 Villanova +^	7	–	1	–	0	10	–	2	–	0
No. 11 New Hampshire +^	7	–	1	–	0	9	–	3	–	0
Rhode Island	3	–	5	–	0	6	–	5	–	0
UMass	3	–	5	–	0	4	–	7	–	0
Boston University	3	–	5	–	0	4	–	7	–	0
Maine	2	–	6	–	0	3	–	8	–	0
Connecticut	2	–	6	–	0	3	–	8	–	0
Richmond	2	–	6	–	0	2	–	9	–	0
+ – Conference co-champions; ^ – NCAA Division I-AA playoff participant; Rankings from NCAA Division I-AA Football Committee poll

The 1991 Villanova Wildcats football team represented the Villanova University as a member of the Yankee Conference during the 1991 NCAA Division I-AA football season. Led by seventh-year head coach Andy Talley, the Wildcats played their home games at Villanova Stadium in Villanova, Pennsylvania. Villanova finished the season with an overall record of 10–2 and a conference mark of 7–1, sharing the Yankee Conference title with Delaware and New Hampshire. Villanova qualified for the NCAA Division I-AA Football Championship playoffs, losing to the eventual national champion, Youngstown State, in the first round.

== Schedule ==
Date	Opponent	Rank	Site	Result	Attendance	Source
September 7	at Maine		Alumni Stadium; Orono, ME	W 48–7	7,796	
September 14	at Bucknell*	No. 16	Christy Mathewson–Memorial Stadium; Lewisburg, PA	W 40–0	5,736	
September 21	at Richmond	No. 16	University of Richmond Stadium; Richmond, VA	W 35–3	7,200	
September 28	Connecticut	No. 13	Villanova Stadium; Villanova, PA	W 35–13	10,116	
October 5	Boston University	No. 8	Villanova Stadium; Villanova, PA	W 56–6	12,000	
October 19	at No. 14 Delaware	No. 4	Delaware Stadium; Newark, DE (rivalry)	L 28–38	18,534	
October 26	William & Mary*	No. T–12	Villanova Stadium; Villanova, PA	W 35–21	6,887	
November 2	at Rhode Island	No. T–10	Meade Stadium; Kingston, RI	W 49–14	3,052	
November 9	No. 7 New Hampshire	No. 9	Villanova Stadium; Villanova, PA	W 33–7	10,416	
November 16	UMass	No. 7	Villanova Stadium; Villanova, PA	W 24–14	6,000	
November 23	at Fordham*	No. 7	Coffey Field; Bronx, NY	W 14–9	4,739	
November 30	at No. 13 Youngstown State*	No. 7	Stambaugh Stadium; Youngstown, OH (NCAA Division I-AA First Round)	L 16–17	9,556	
*Non-conference game; Rankings from NCAA Division I-AA Football Committee Poll released prior to the game
