= 1991 Georgia Southern Eagles football team =

American college football season

1991 Georgia Southern Eagles football
- Conference: Independent
- Record: 7–4
- Head coach: Tim Stowers (2nd season)
- Co-defensive coordinators: Jeff McInerney (2nd season); Tommy Spangler (2nd season)
- Home stadium: Paulson Stadium

1991 NCAA Division I-AA independents football standings
	Conf.			Overall
Team	W	L	T	W		L		T
No. 10 Samford ^		–		12	–	2	–	0
No. 16 James Madison ^		–		9	–	4	–	0
No. 13 Youngstown State ^		–		12	–	3	–	0
Georgia Southern		–		7	–	4	–	0
UCF		–		6	–	5	–	0
William & Mary		–		5	–	6	–	0
Liberty		–		4	–	7	–	0
Northeastern		–		4	–	7	–	0
Western Kentucky		–		3	–	8	–	0
Arkansas State		–		1	–	10	–	0
Towson State		–		1	–	10	–	0
^ – NCAA Division I-AA playoff participant; Rankings from NCAA Division I-AA Football Committee poll

The 1991 Georgia Southern Eagles football team represented Georgia Southern University, competing as an independent during the 1991 NCAA Division I-AA football season. Under second-year head coach Tim Stowers, the Eagles compiled a record of 7–4. They played their home games at Paulson Stadium in Statesboro, Georgia.

== Schedule ==
Date	Time	Opponent	Rank	Site	Result	Attendance	Source
August 31	6:30 pm	at No. 17 (I-A) Auburn	No. 1	Jordan-Hare Stadium; Auburn, AL	L 17–32	79,120	
September 7		Savannah State	No. 1	Paulson Stadium; Statesboro, GA	W 29–6	14,312	
September 14		at Northeast Louisiana	No. 1	Malone Stadium; Monroe, LA	L 13–21	16,281	
September 21		at Florida A&M	No. 9	Bragg Memorial Stadium; Tallahassee, FL	W 28–21	12,525	
October 5		at No. 3 Eastern Kentucky	No. 6	Roy Kidd Stadium; Richmond, KY	L 6–10	16,200	
October 12		Western Carolina		Paulson Stadium; Statesboro, GA	W 44–6	19,190	
October 19		at No. 10 James Madison		Bridgeforth Stadium; Harrisonburg, VA	W 24–21	12,119	
October 26		UCF		Paulson Stadium; Statesboro, GA	W 20–6	19,063	
November 2		Youngstown State	No. T–20	Paulson Stadium; Statesboro, GA	L 17–19	16,461	
November 16		Troy State		Paulson Stadium; Statesboro, GA	W 19–12	18,590	
November 23		Nicholls State		Paulson Stadium; Statesboro, GA	W 40–6	14,493	
Rankings from NCAA Division I-AA Football Committee Poll released prior to the game; All times are in Eastern time
