= 1991 Delaware Fightin' Blue Hens football team =

American college football season

1991 Delaware Fightin' Blue Hens football

Yankee Conference co-champion Lambert Cup winner

NCAA Division I-AA First Round, L 35–42 ^{2OT} at James Madison
- Conference: Yankee Conference
- Record: 10–2 (7–1 Yankee)
- Head coach: Tubby Raymond (26th season)
- Offensive coordinator: Ted Kempski (24th season)
- Offensive scheme: Delaware Wing-T
- Defensive coordinator: Bob Sabol (1st season)
- Base defense: 4–3
- Home stadium: Delaware Stadium

1991 Yankee Conference football standings
	Conf.					Overall
Team	W		L		T	W		L		T
No. 6 Delaware +^	7	–	1	–	0	10	–	2	–	0
No. 7 Villanova +^	7	–	1	–	0	10	–	2	–	0
No. 11 New Hampshire +^	7	–	1	–	0	9	–	3	–	0
Rhode Island	3	–	5	–	0	6	–	5	–	0
UMass	3	–	5	–	0	4	–	7	–	0
Boston University	3	–	5	–	0	4	–	7	–	0
Maine	2	–	6	–	0	3	–	8	–	0
Connecticut	2	–	6	–	0	3	–	8	–	0
Richmond	2	–	6	–	0	2	–	9	–	0
+ – Conference co-champions; ^ – NCAA Division I-AA playoff participant; Rankings from NCAA Division I-AA Football Committee poll

The 1991 Delaware Fightin' Blue Hens football team represented the University of Delaware as a member of the Yankee Conference during the 1991 NCAA Division I-AA football season. Led by 26th-year head coach Tubby Raymond, the Fightin' Blue Hens compiled an overall record of 10–2 with a mark of 7–1 in conference play, sharing the Yankee Conference title with New Hampshire and Villanova. Delaware advanced to the NCAA Division I-AA Football Championship playoffs, where Fightin' Blue Hens lost in the first round to James Madison. The team played home games at Delaware Stadium in Newark, Delaware.

== Schedule ==
Date	Opponent	Rank	Site	Result	Attendance	Source
August 31	West Chester*		Delaware Stadium; Newark, DE (rivalry)	W 28–0	18,082	
September 7	at UMass		Warren McGuirk Alumni Stadium; Hadley, MA	W 24–7	9,527	
September 14	at No. 3 William & Mary*	No. 12	Zable Stadium; Williamsburg, VA (rivalry)	W 28–21	13,579	
September 21	at Rhode Island	No. 8	Meade Stadium; Kingston, RI	W 42–7	7,871	
October 5	No. 20 New Hampshire^{†}	No. 5	Delaware Stadium; Newark, DE	L 28–45	22,304	
October 12	at Boston University	No. 16	Nickerson Field; Boston, MA	W 35–21	1,839	
October 19	No. 4 Villanova	No. 14	Delaware Stadium; Newark, DE (rivalry)	W 38–28	18,534	
October 26	at Navy*	No. 11	Navy–Marine Corps Memorial Stadium; Annapolis, MD	W 29–25	30,490	
November 2	Maine	No. 9	Delaware Stadium; Newark, DE	W 34–10	22,601	
November 9	at Connecticut	No. 8	Memorial Stadium; Storrs, CT	W 49–18	7,424	
November 16	Richmond	No. 6	Delaware Stadium; Newark, DE	W 23–17	17,812	
November 30	No. 16 James Madison*	No. 6	Delaware Stadium; Newark, DE (NCAA Division I-AA First Round, rivalry)	L 35–42 ^{2OT}		
*Non-conference game; ^{†}Homecoming; Rankings from NCAA Division I-AA Football Committee Poll released prior to the game

== Roster ==
1991 Delaware Fightin' Blue Hens football team roster
Players
Coaches
Offense

Pos.	#	Name	Class
WR	2	Keita Malloy	So
RB	3	Pat Williams	Fr

Defense

Pos.	#	Name	Class
DB	11	Tim Jacobs	Jr

Special teams

Pos.	#	Name	Class
K	1	Mark Drozic	Sr

Head coach

- Tubby Raymond

Coordinators/assistant coaches

Legend

- (C) Team captain
- (S) Suspended
- (I) Ineligible
- Injured
- Redshirt

Roster
