= 1991 UMass Minutemen football team =

American college football season

1991 UMass Minutemen football
- Conference: Yankee Conference
- Record: 4–7 (3–5 Yankee)
- Head coach: Jim Reid (6th season)
- Home stadium: Warren McGuirk Alumni Stadium

1991 Yankee Conference football standings
	Conf.					Overall
Team	W		L		T	W		L		T
No. 6 Delaware +^	7	–	1	–	0	10	–	2	–	0
No. 7 Villanova +^	7	–	1	–	0	10	–	2	–	0
No. 11 New Hampshire +^	7	–	1	–	0	9	–	3	–	0
Rhode Island	3	–	5	–	0	6	–	5	–	0
UMass	3	–	5	–	0	4	–	7	–	0
Boston University	3	–	5	–	0	4	–	7	–	0
Maine	2	–	6	–	0	3	–	8	–	0
Connecticut	2	–	6	–	0	3	–	8	–	0
Richmond	2	–	6	–	0	2	–	9	–	0
+ – Conference co-champions; ^ – NCAA Division I-AA playoff participant; Rankings from NCAA Division I-AA Football Committee poll

The 1991 UMass Minutemen football team represented the University of Massachusetts Amherst in the 1991 NCAA Division I-AA football season as a member of the Yankee Conference. The team was coached by Jim Reid and played its home games at Warren McGuirk Alumni Stadium in Hadley, Massachusetts. The 1991 season was Reid's last as head coach of the Minutemen. UMass finished the season with a record of 4–7 overall and 3–5 in conference play.

== Schedule ==
Date	Opponent	Rank	Site	Result	Attendance	Source
September 7	Delaware	No. 19	McGuirk Stadium; Hadley, MA	L 7–24	9,527	
September 14	No. 11 Holy Cross*		McGuirk Stadium; Hadley, MA	L 20–22	13,562	
September 21	at Maine		Alumni Stadium; Orono, ME	W 10–3	9,746	
September 28	at Boston University		Nickerson Field; Boston, MA	W 15–7	3,074	
October 5	at No. 19 James Madison*		Bridgeforth Stadium; Harrisonburg, VA	L 7–24	15,104	
October 12	Rhode Island^{†}		McGuirk Stadium; Hadley, MA	L 14–17	9,427	
October 19	at Connecticut		Memorial Stadium; Storrs, CT (rivalry)	L 21–26	10,142	
November 2	vs. Northeastern*		Foxboro Stadium; Foxborough, MA (Jimmy Fund Bowl)	W 27–12	4,620	
November 9	Richmond		McGuirk Stadium; Hadley, MA	W 42–14	4,427	
November 16	at No. 6 Villanova		Villanova Stadium; Villanova, PA	L 14–24	6,000	
November 23	No. 12 New Hampshire		McGuirk Stadium; Hadley, MA (rivalry)	L 28–35	4,126	
*Non-conference game; ^{†}Homecoming; Rankings from NCAA Division I-AA Football Committee Poll released prior to the game
