= 1991 New Hampshire Wildcats football team =

American college football season

1991 New Hampshire Wildcats football

Yankee co-champion

NCAA Division I-AA First Round, L 13–29 vs. Samford
- Conference: Yankee Conference
- Record: 9–3 (7–1 Yankee)
- Head coach: Bill Bowes (20th season)
- Home stadium: Cowell Stadium

1991 Yankee Conference football standings
	Conf.					Overall
Team	W		L		T	W		L		T
No. 6 Delaware +^	7	–	1	–	0	10	–	2	–	0
No. 7 Villanova +^	7	–	1	–	0	10	–	2	–	0
No. 11 New Hampshire +^	7	–	1	–	0	9	–	3	–	0
Rhode Island	3	–	5	–	0	6	–	5	–	0
UMass	3	–	5	–	0	4	–	7	–	0
Boston University	3	–	5	–	0	4	–	7	–	0
Maine	2	–	6	–	0	3	–	8	–	0
Connecticut	2	–	6	–	0	3	–	8	–	0
Richmond	2	–	6	–	0	2	–	9	–	0
+ – Conference co-champions; ^ – NCAA Division I-AA playoff participant; Rankings from NCAA Division I-AA Football Committee poll

The 1991 New Hampshire Wildcats football team was an American football team that represented the University of New Hampshire as a member of the Yankee Conference during the 1991 NCAA Division I-AA football season. In its 20th year under head coach Bill Bowes, the team compiled a 9–3 record (7–1 against conference opponents), tied for the Yankee Conference championship, and lost to Samford in the first round of the NCAA Division I-AA Football Championship playoffs.

== Schedule ==
Date	Opponent	Rank	Site	Result	Attendance	Source
September 7	at No. T–14 Marshall*	No. 8	Marshall University Stadium; Huntington, WV	L 23–24	33,116	
September 14	Connecticut		Cowell Stadium; Durham, NH	W 21–16	6,802	
September 21	Hofstra*	No. 20	Cowell Stadium; Durham, NH	W 48–28		
September 28	Maine	No. T–20	Cowell Stadium; Durham, NH (rivalry)	W 38–20	9,533	
October 5	at No. 5 Delaware	No. T–20	Delaware Stadium; Newark, DE	W 45–28	22,304	
October 12	Richmond	No. 14	Cowell Stadium; Durham, NH	W 34–0	11,077	
October 26	at Northeastern*	No. 9	Parsons Field; Brookline, MA	W 18–14	8,206	
November 2	Boston University	No. 8	Cowell Stadium; Durham, NH	W 45–26		
November 9	at No. 9 Villanova	No. 7	Villanova Stadium; Villanova, PA	L 7–33	10,416	
November 16	Rhode Island	No. 15	Cowell Stadium; Durham, NH	W 42–35	6,639	
November 23	at UMass	No. 12	McGuirk Stadium; Hadley, MA (rivalry)	W 35–28	4,126	
November 30	No. 10 Samford	No. 11	Cowell Stadium; Durham, NH (NCAA Division I-AA First Round)	L 13–29		
*Non-conference game; Rankings from NCAA Division I-AA Football Committee Poll released prior to the game
