= 1991 NCAA Division I-AA football season =

American college football season

1991 NCAA Division I-AA season

Regular season
- Number of teams: 90
- Duration: August–November
- Payton Award: Jamie Martin (QB, Weber State)

Playoff
- Duration: November 30–December 21
- Championship date: December 21, 1991
- Championship site: Paulson Stadium; Statesboro, Georgia
- Champion: Youngstown State

NCAA Division I-AA football seasons
- «1990 1992»

The 1991 NCAA Division I-AA football season, part of college football in the United States organized by the National Collegiate Athletic Association at the Division I-AA level, began in August 1991, and concluded with the 1991 NCAA Division I-AA Football Championship Game on December 21, 1991, at Paulson Stadium in Statesboro, Georgia. The Youngstown State Penguins won their first I-AA championship, defeating the Marshall Thundering Herd by a score of 25−17.

== Conference changes and new programs ==
Team	1990 conference	1991 conference
Hofstra	D-III independent	I-AA independent
Nicholls State	I-AA independent	Southland Conference
Prairie View A&M	Revived program	Southwestern Athletic Conference
Southeast Missouri State	Mid-America Intercollegiate Athletics Association (D-II)	Ohio Valley Conference

== Conference standings ==
1991 Big Sky Conference football standings
	Conf.					Overall
Team	W		L		T	W		L		T
No. 1 Nevada $^	8	–	0	–	0	12	–	1	–	0
No. 15 Weber State ^	6	–	2	–	0	8	–	4	–	0
Montana	6	–	2	–	0	7	–	4	–	0
Boise State	4	–	4	–	0	7	–	4	–	0
Idaho	4	–	4	–	0	6	–	5	–	0
Eastern Washington	4	–	4	–	0	5	–	6	–	0
Idaho State	2	–	6	–	0	3	–	7	–	1
Northern Arizona	1	–	7	–	0	3	–	8	–	0
Montana State	1	–	7	–	0	2	–	9	–	0
$ – Conference champion; ^ – NCAA Division I-AA playoff participant; Rankings from NCAA Division I-AA Poll

1991 Gateway Collegiate Athletic Conference football standings
	Conf.					Overall
Team	W		L		T	W		L		T
No. 4 Northern Iowa $^	5	–	1	–	0	11	–	2	–	0
No. 14 Western Illinois ^	4	–	2	–	0	7	–	4	–	1
Southern Illinois	4	–	2	–	0	7	–	4	–	0
Southwest Missouri State	3	–	3	–	0	6	–	4	–	1
Indiana State	2	–	4	–	0	5	–	6	–	0
Eastern Illinois	2	–	4	–	0	4	–	7	–	0
Illinois State	1	–	5	–	0	5	–	6	–	0
$ – Conference champion; ^ – NCAA Division I-AA playoff participant; Rankings from NCAA Division I-AA Football Committee poll

1991 Ivy League football standings
	Conf.					Overall
Team	W		L		T	W		L		T
Dartmouth $	6	–	0	–	1	7	–	2	–	1
Princeton	5	–	2	–	0	8	–	2	–	0
Harvard	4	–	2	–	1	4	–	5	–	1
Yale	4	–	3	–	0	6	–	4	–	0
Cornell	4	–	3	–	0	5	–	5	–	0
Penn	2	–	5	–	0	2	–	8	–	0
Brown	1	–	6	–	0	1	–	9	–	0
Columbia	1	–	6	–	0	1	–	9	–	0
$ – Conference champion

1991 Mid-Eastern Athletic Conference football standings
	Conf.					Overall
Team	W		L		T	W		L		T
Delaware State +	5	–	1	–	0	9	–	2	–	0
North Carolina A&T +	5	–	1	–	0	9	–	3	–	0
South Carolina State	3	–	3	–	0	7	–	4	–	0
Florida A&M	3	–	3	–	0	5	–	5	–	0
Bethune–Cookman	3	–	3	–	0	4	–	6	–	0
Howard	1	–	5	–	0	2	–	9	–	0
Morgan State	1	–	5	–	0	1	–	10	–	0
+ – Conference co-champions

1991 Ohio Valley Conference football standings
	Conf.					Overall
Team	W		L		T	W		L		T
No. 2 Eastern Kentucky $^	7	–	0	–	0	12	–	2	–	0
No. 9 Middle Tennessee ^	6	–	1	–	0	9	–	4	–	0
Austin Peay	3	–	4	–	0	5	–	6	–	0
Morehead State	3	–	4	–	0	4	–	7	–	0
Southeast Missouri State	3	–	4	–	0	3	–	8	–	0
Tennessee State	2	–	5	–	0	3	–	8	–	0
Tennessee Tech	2	–	5	–	0	2	–	9	–	0
Murray State	1	–	6	–	0	3	–	8	–	0
$ – Conference champion; ^ – NCAA Division I-AA playoff participant; Rankings from NCAA Division I-AA Football Committee poll

1991 Patriot League football standings
	Conf.					Overall
Team	W		L		T	W		L		T
No. 3 Holy Cross $	5	–	0	–	0	11	–	0	–	0
Lehigh	3	–	2	–	0	9	–	2	–	0
Lafayette	3	–	2	–	0	6	–	5	–	0
Colgate	3	–	2	–	0	4	–	7	–	0
Bucknell	1	–	4	–	0	1	–	9	–	0
Fordham	0	–	5	–	0	2	–	8	–	0
$ – Conference champion; Rankings from NCAA Division I-AA Football Committee poll

1991 Southern Conference football standings
	Conf.					Overall
Team	W		L		T	W		L		T
No. 17 Appalachian State $^	6	–	1	–	0	8	–	4	–	0
No. 8 Marshall ^	5	–	2	–	0	11	–	4	–	0
No. T–20 The Citadel	5	–	2	–	0	7	–	4	–	0
No. T–20 Furman	4	–	3	–	0	7	–	4	–	0
Chattanooga	4	–	3	–	0	7	–	4	–	0
VMI	2	–	5	–	0	4	–	7	–	0
Western Carolina	2	–	5	–	0	2	–	9	–	0
East Tennessee State	0	–	7	–	0	1	–	10	–	0
$ – Conference champion; ^ – NCAA Division I-AA playoff participant; Rankings from NCAA Division I-AA Football Committee poll

1991 Southland Conference football standings
	Conf.					Overall
Team	W		L		T	W		L		T
No. 12 Sam Houston State +^	5	–	2	–	0	8	–	3	–	1
No. 19 McNeese State +^	4	–	1	–	2	6	–	4	–	2
No. 18 NE Louisiana	4	–	2	–	1	7	–	3	–	1
SW Texas State	4	–	3	–	0	7	–	4	–	0
Northwestern State	4	–	3	–	0	6	–	5	–	0
Nicholls State	2	–	5	–	0	4	–	7	–	0
North Texas	2	–	5	–	0	3	–	7	–	1
Stephen F. Austin	1	–	5	–	1	2	–	8	–	1
+ – Conference co-champions; ^ – NCAA Division I-AA playoff participant; Rankings from NCAA Division I-AA Football Committee poll

1991 Southwestern Athletic Conference football standings
	Conf.					Overall
Team	W		L		T	W		L		T
No. 5 Alabama State $	6	–	0	–	1	11	–	0	–	1
Alcorn State	4	–	2	–	1	7	–	2	–	1
Southern	4	–	3	–	0	4	–	7	–	0
Texas Southern	3	–	3	–	1	5	–	5	–	1
Mississippi Valley State	3	–	3	–	1	7	–	3	–	1
Jackson State	3	–	4	–	0	5	–	5	–	0
Grambling State	3	–	4	–	0	5	–	6	–	0
Prairie View A&M	0	–	7	–	0	0	–	11	–	0
$ – Conference champion; Rankings from NCAA Division I-AA Football Committee poll

1991 Yankee Conference football standings
	Conf.					Overall
Team	W		L		T	W		L		T
No. 6 Delaware +^	7	–	1	–	0	10	–	2	–	0
No. 7 Villanova +^	7	–	1	–	0	10	–	2	–	0
No. 11 New Hampshire +^	7	–	1	–	0	9	–	3	–	0
Rhode Island	3	–	5	–	0	6	–	5	–	0
UMass	3	–	5	–	0	4	–	7	–	0
Boston University	3	–	5	–	0	4	–	7	–	0
Maine	2	–	6	–	0	3	–	8	–	0
Connecticut	2	–	6	–	0	3	–	8	–	0
Richmond	2	–	6	–	0	2	–	9	–	0
+ – Conference co-champions; ^ – NCAA Division I-AA playoff participant; Rankings from NCAA Division I-AA Football Committee poll

1991 NCAA Division I-AA independents football standings
	Conf.			Overall
Team	W	L	T	W		L		T
No. 10 Samford ^		–		12	–	2	–	0
No. 16 James Madison ^		–		9	–	4	–	0
No. 13 Youngstown State ^		–		12	–	3	–	0
Georgia Southern		–		7	–	4	–	0
UCF		–		6	–	5	–	0
William & Mary		–		5	–	6	–	0
Liberty		–		4	–	7	–	0
Northeastern		–		4	–	7	–	0
Western Kentucky		–		3	–	8	–	0
Arkansas State		–		1	–	10	–	0
Towson State		–		1	–	10	–	0
^ – NCAA Division I-AA playoff participant; Rankings from NCAA Division I-AA Football Committee poll

== Conference champions ==
Conference Champions

Big Sky Conference – Nevada
Gateway Collegiate Athletic Conference – Northern Iowa
Ivy League – Dartmouth
Mid-Eastern Athletic Conference – North Carolina A&T
Ohio Valley Conference – Eastern Kentucky
Patriot League – Holy Cross
Southern Conference – Appalachian State
Southland Conference – McNeese State and Sam Houston State
Southwestern Athletic Conference – Alabama State
Yankee Conference – Delaware, New Hampshire, and Villanova

== Postseason ==
Only the top four teams in the field were seeded, and thus assured of home games in their first round games. The location of the final, the Georgia Southern Eagles' Paulson Stadium, had been predetermined via a three-year agreement the university reached with the NCAA in February 1989.

=== NCAA Division I-AA playoff bracket ===
First Round; November 30; Campus sites
McNeese State	16
(1) Nevada*	22
Villanova	16
Youngstown State*	17
James Madison	42**
(4) Delaware*	35
Samford	29
New Hampshire*	13
Appalachian State	3
(2) Eastern Kentucky*	14
Sam Houston State	19
Middle Tennessee*	20*
Weber State	21
(3) Northern Iowa*	38
Western Illinois	17
Marshall*	20*

Quarterfinals; December 7 Campus sites
(1) Nevada*	28
Youngstown State	30
James Madison*	21
Samford	24
(2) Eastern Kentucky*	23
Middle Tennessee State	13
(3) Northern Iowa	13
Marshall*	41

Semifinals; December 14; Campus sites
Youngstown State*	10
Samford	0
(2) Eastern Kentucky	7
Marshall*	14

National Championship Game; December 21; Paulson Stadium; Statesboro, GA
Youngstown State	25
Marshall	17

* Next to team name denotes host institution
* Next to score denotes host overtime period
