= Stambaugh Stadium =

Stadium in Ohio, USA

- The Ice Castle

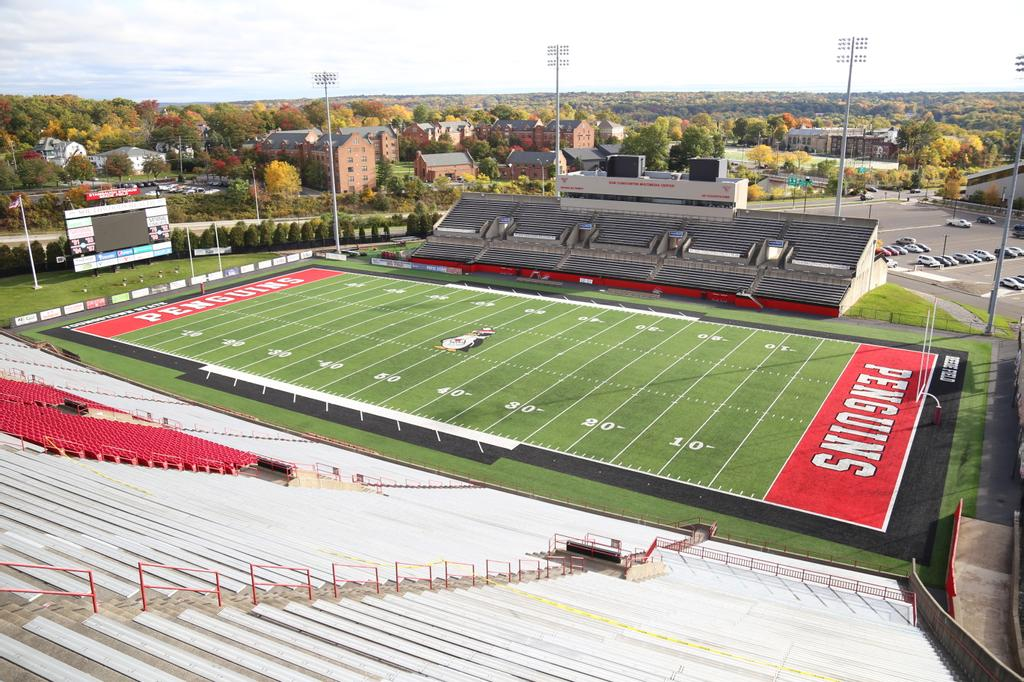
- View of the stadium in 2020
- Interactive map of Stambaugh Stadium
- Full name: Arnold D. Stambaugh Stadium
- Address: 577 Fifth Avenue Youngstown, OH; United States
- Coordinates: 41°06′34″N 80°38′57″W
- Owner: Youngstown State University
- Operator: Youngstown State Athletics
- Capacity: 20,630 (1997–present); 17,000 (1982–1997)
- Type: Stadium
- Surface: SprinTurf
- Current use: Football

Construction
- Opened: September 4, 1982; 44 years ago
- Expanded: 1997

Tenants
- Youngstown State Penguins (NCAA) teams: football (1982–present); women's soccer (1996–2013)

Website
- ysusports.com/stambaugh-stadium

Stambaugh Stadium, officially Arnold D. Stambaugh Stadium, is a stadium in Youngstown, Ohio, United States, sited on the campus of Youngstown State University. The stadium was built in 1982, and is primarily used for American football. It is the home venue for the Youngstown State Penguins football team, a member of the National Collegiate Athletic Association (NCAA) at the Division I Football Championship Division (FCS) level and the Missouri Valley Football Conference.

== History ==
When it opened in 1982, Stambaugh had one large grandstand on the west side, with a seating capacity of approximately 17,000. During their time at Stambaugh, the football team has risen to become a power in FCS football, qualifying for NCAA Division I Football Championship playoffs 14 times, advancing to the championship game on seven occasions, and winning four national championships through the 2025 season. The stadium is also known by fans as the "Ice Castle".

The stadium's 25th Anniversary was celebrated during the 2007 season, and the top 25 players in the stadium's first 25 years were honored at a ceremony on September 15, 2007. Those players were:

Tony Bowens (1987–90)
Adrian Brown (1996–99)
Pat Crummey (1998–2001)
Pat Danko (1988–91)
Harry Deligianis (1995–97)
Drew Gerber (1990–93)
LeVar Greene (1998–2001)
Matt Hogg (1994–97)
Tim Johnson (1999–2000)
Leon Jones (1992–95)
Todd Kollar (1994–97)
Paul McFadden (1980–83)
Marcus Mason (2005–06)
P.J. Mays (2000–02)
Dave Roberts (1989–92)
Jeff Ryan (1998–2001)
Ian Shirey (1996–99)
Dwyte Smiley (1996–99)
Randy Smith (1991–94)
Tamron Smith (1990–93)
Paul Soltis (1987–89)
Lester Weaver (1991–94)
Paris Wicks (1979–82)
Jeff Wilkins (1990–93)
Jim Zdelar (1987–88)

=== Renovations ===
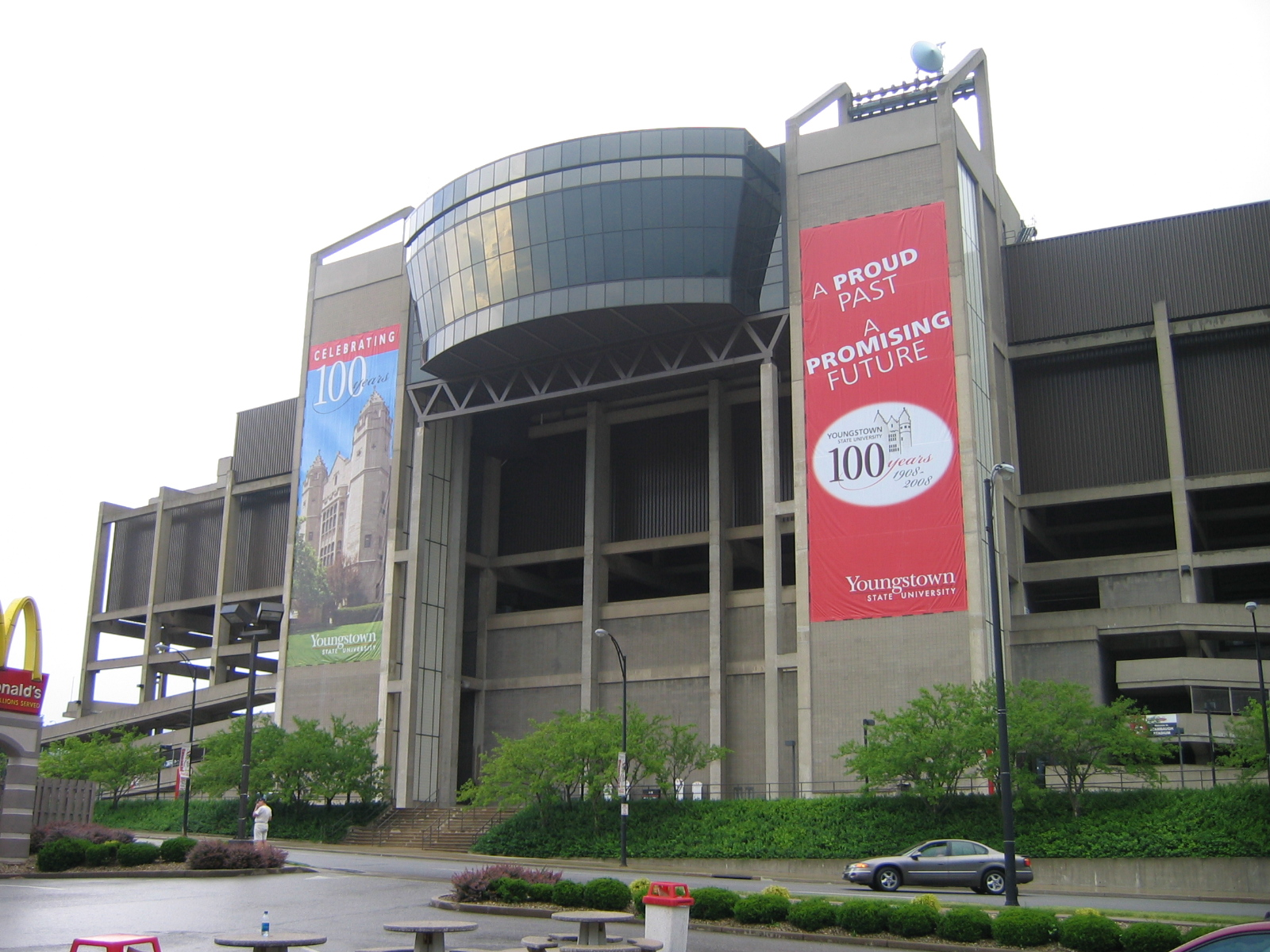
Exterior view of Stambaugh Stadium in 2008

The stadium was upgraded and expanded prior to the 1997 athletic season with the addition of over 3,000 bleacher seats on the east side of the field, on the site of a practice field. In addition, a new press box was created and 14 additional luxury suites were built, along with a stadium club, which hosts the football team's weekly press conferences and is rented out for private events. Since 1997, the stadium's capacity is 20,630, making it the largest stadium in the Missouri Valley Football Conference.

In the summer of 2009, an auxiliary scoreboard was constructed in the south end zone, giving Stambaugh Stadium a scoreboard in each end zone. New reserved chairback seats were also installed during the 2009 season along with two new flagpoles next to the scoreboard in the north end zone, one for the Ohio flag and one for the United States flag.

== See also ==
- List of NCAA Division I FCS football stadiums
