= 1991 NCAA Division I-AA football rankings =

The 1991 NCAA Division I-AA football rankings are from the NCAA Division I-AA football committee. This is for the 1991 season.

== Legend ==
	Increase in ranking
	Decrease in ranking
	Not ranked previous week
(#–#)	Win–loss record
(Italics)	Number of first place votes
т	Tied with team above or below also with this symbol

== NCAA Division I-AA Football Committee poll ==
	Preseason	Week 1 Sept 10	Week 2 Sept 17	Week 3 Sept 24	Week 4 Oct 1	Week 5 Oct 8	Week 6 Oct 15	Week 7 Oct 22	Week 8 Oct 29	Week 9 Nov 5	Week 10 Nov 12	Week 11 Nov 19	Week 12 Nov 26	
1.	Georgia Southern	Georgia Southern (1–1) (4)	Nevada (2–0) (4)	Nevada (3–0) (4)	Nevada (4–0) (4)	Nevada (5–0) (4)	Nevada (6–0) (4)	Nevada (7–0) (4)	Nevada (8–0) (4)	Nevada (9–0) (4)	Nevada (10–0) (4)	Nevada (11–0) (4)	Nevada (11–0) (4)	1.
2.	Eastern Kentucky	Nevada (1–0)	Idaho (2–0)	Idaho (3–0)	Furman (4–0)	Furman (5–0)	Eastern Kentucky (5–1)	Eastern Kentucky (5–1)	Eastern Kentucky (6–1)	Eastern Kentucky (7–1)	Eastern Kentucky (8–1)	Eastern Kentucky (9–1)	Eastern Kentucky (10–1)	2.
3.	Idaho	William & Mary (1–0)	Eastern Kentucky (1–1) т	Eastern Kentucky (2–1) т	Eastern Kentucky (3–1)	Eastern Kentucky (4–1)	Holy Cross (5–0)	Holy Cross (6–0)	Holy Cross (7–0)	Holy Cross (8–0)	Holy Cross (9–0)	Holy Cross (10–0)	Holy Cross (11–0)	3.
4.	William & Mary	Idaho (1–0)	Furman (2–0) т	Furman (3–0) т	Boise State (4–0)	Boise State (4–0)	Villanova (5–0)	Northern Iowa (5–1)	Northern Iowa (6–1)	Northern Iowa (7–1)	Northern Iowa (8–1)	Northern Iowa (9–1)	Northern Iowa (10–1)	4.
5.	Nevada	Eastern Kentucky (1–1)	Northern Iowa (2–0)	Boise State (3–0)	Delaware (4–0)	Holy Cross (4–0)	Northern Iowa (5–1)	Sam Houston State (5–0–1)	Sam Houston State (6–0–1)	Alabama State (7–0–1)	Alabama State (8–0–1)	Alabama State (9–0–1)	Alabama State (9–0–1)	5.
6.	Furman	Furman (1–0)	Boise State (2–0)	Delaware (4–0)	Georgia Southern (2–2)	Villanova (5–0)	Sam Houston State (4–0–1)	Marshall (4–2)	Alabama State (6–0–1)	Middle Tennessee State (6–2)	Delaware (9–1)	Delaware (10–1)	Delaware (10–1)	6.
7.	Northern Iowa	Northern Iowa (1–0)	Middle Tennessee State (1–0)	Georgia Southern (2–2)	Holy Cross (3–0)	Northern Iowa (4–1)	Middle Tennessee State (4–1)	Alabama State (5–0–1)	Middle Tennessee State (5–2)	New Hampshire (7–1)	Villanova (8–1)	Villanova (9–1)	Villanova (10–1)	7.
8.	New Hampshire	Youngstown State (1–0)	Delaware (3–0)	William & Mary (2–1)	Villanova (4–0)	Sam Houston State (3–0–1)	Marshall (4–1)	Middle Tennessee State (4–2)	New Hampshire (6–1)	Delaware (8–1)	Sam Houston State (7–1–1)	Marshall (7–3)	Marshall (8–3)	8.
9.	Youngstown State	SW Texas State (1–0)	Georgia Southern (1–2)	Holy Cross (2–0)	Northern Iowa (3–1)	Middle Tennessee State (3–1)	Furman (5–1)	New Hampshire (5–1)	Delaware (7–1)	Villanova (7–1)	Boise State (7–2)	Middle Tennessee State (7–3)	Middle Tennessee State (8–3)	9.
10.	SW Texas State	Middle Tennessee State (1–0)	Holy Cross (1–0)	Chattanooga (3–0)	Sam Houston State (3–0–1)	NE Louisiana (4–1)	James Madison (5–1)	Boise State (5–1)	Appalachian State (6–2) т	Sam Houston State (6–1–1)	Marshall (6–3)	Furman (7–3)	Samford (10–1)	10.
11.	UCF	Boise State (1–0)	William & Mary (1–1)	Sam Houston State (3–0)	Alabama State (4–0)	Alabama State (4–0–1) т	Alabama State (4–0–1)	Delaware (6–1)	Villanova (6–1) т	Furman (6–2)	Middle Tennessee State (6–3)	Samford (9–1)	New Hampshire (9–2)	11.
12.	Middle Tennessee State	Delaware (2–0)	Sam Houston State (2–0)	SW Missouri State (2–1)	Middle Tennessee State (2–1) т	James Madison (4–1) т	New Hampshire (5–1)	Appalachian State (6–2) т	Western Illinois (6–1–1)	James Madison (7–2)	Furman (6–3)	New Hampshire (8–2)	Sam Houston State (8–2–1)	12.
13.	Holy Cross	Chattanooga (2–0)	Chattanooga (2–0)	Villanova (3–0)	SW Texas State (2–1) т	Marshall (3–1)	Boise State (4–1)	Villanova (5–1) т	Furman (5–2)	Boise State (6–2)	Western Illinois (7–2–1)	Sam Houston State (7–2–1)	Youngstown State (8–3)	13.
14.	Boise State т	Holy Cross (0–0)	SW Texas State (1–1)	SW Texas State (1–1)	Idaho (3–1)	New Hampshire (4–1)	Delaware (5–1)	Western Illinois (5–1–1)	James Madison (6–2)	Samford (8–1)	Samford (8–1)	Western Illinois (7–3–1) т	Western Illinois (7–3–1)	14.
15.	Marshall т	North Carolina A&T (2–0)	Alabama State (2–0)	Alabama State (3–0)	Southern Illinois (5–0)	SW Missouri State (3–1–1)	NE Louisiana (4–1–1)	Furman (5–2)	Boise State (5–2)	Marshall (5–3)	New Hampshire (7–2)	Youngstown State (7–3) т	Weber State (8–3)	15.
16.	NE Louisiana	Villanova (1–0)	Villanova (2–0)	Middle Tennessee State (1–1)	NE Louisiana (3–1)	Delaware (4–1)	Appalachian State (5–2)	NW Louisiana (4–2)	NE Louisiana (5–2–1)	Western Illinois (6–2–1)	Youngstown State (6–3)	Weber State (7–3)	James Madison (8–3)	16.
17.	SW Missouri State	Sam Houston State (1–0)	SW Missouri State (1–1)	Northern Iowa (2–1) т	James Madison (3–1)	Appalachian State (4–2)	Western Illinois (4–1–1) т	James Madison (5–2)	SW Missouri State (5–2–1)	Lehigh (7–1)	James Madison (7–3)	James Madison (7–3)	Appalachian State (8–3)	17.
18.	UMass	Alabama State (1–0)	NE Louisiana (2–1)	NE Louisiana (2–1) т	Marshall (3–1)	Youngstown State (4–1)	Weber State (5–1) т	SW Missouri State (4–2–1)	Samford (7–1)	The Citadel (5–3)	Appalachian State (7–3)	Appalachian State (8–3)	NE Louisiana (7–3–1)	18.
19.	Alabama State	The Citadel (1–0)	Appalachian State (2–1)	Southern Illinois (4–0)	SW Missouri State (2–1–1)	Idaho (3–2)	Samford (6–0)	Lehigh (6–0)	Marshall (4–3)	McNeese State (4–3–1)	NE Louisiana (5–3–1)	Boise State (7–3) т	McNeese State (6–3–2)	19.
20.	Cornell	SW Missouri State (0–1)	New Hampshire (1–1)	Illinois State (3–0) т	New Hampshire (3–1) т	Southern Illinois (5–1)	Mississippi Valley State (6–0) т	NE Louisiana (4–2–1)	Georgia Southern (5–3) т	Appalachian State (6–3)	Alcorn State (6–2–1) т	McNeese State (5–3–2) т	The Citadel (7–4) т	20.
21.				Marshall (2–1) т	William & Mary (2–2) т		Lehigh (5–0) т		Lehigh (6–1) т		Weber State (6–3) т	NE Louisiana (6–3–1) т	Furman (7–4) т	21.
22.				New Hampshire (2–1) т										22.
	Preseason	Week 1 Sept 10	Week 2 Sept 17	Week 3 Sept 24	Week 4 Oct 1	Week 5 Oct 8	Week 6 Oct 15	Week 7 Oct 22	Week 8 Oct 29	Week 9 Nov 5	Week 10 Nov 12	Week 11 Nov 19	Week 12 Nov 26	
		Dropped: 8 New Hampshire; 11 UCF; 15 Marshall; 16 NE Louisiana; 18 UMass; 20 Cornell	Dropped: 8 Youngstown State; 15 North Carolina A&T; 19 The Citadel	Dropped: 19 Appalachian State	Dropped: 10 Chattanooga; 20 Illinois State	Dropped: 6 Georgia Southern; 13 SW Texas State; T–20 William & Mary	Dropped: 15 SW Missouri State; 18 Youngstown State; 19 Idaho; 20 Southern Illinois	Dropped: 18 Weber State; 19 Samford; 20 Mississippi Valley State	Dropped: 16 NW Louisiana	Dropped: 16 NE Louisiana; 17 SW Missouri State; 20 Georgia Southern	Dropped: 17 Lehigh; 18 The Citadel; 19 McNeese State	Dropped: 20 Alcorn State	Dropped: 19 Boise State	
