= 2018 Southeastern Conference football season =

- League: NCAA Division I Football Bowl Subdivision
- Sport: Football
- Duration: August 30, 2018 through January 2019
- Teams: 14
- TV partner(s): CBS Sports Family (CBS, CBSSN), ESPN Family (ESPN, ESPN2, ESPN3, ESPNU, SECN, ABC, ESPN+)

2019 NFL Draft
- Top draft pick: Quinnen Williams (Alabama)
- Picked by: New York Jets, 3rd overall

Regular season
- East champions: Georgia
- East runners-up: Florida; Kentucky
- West champions: Alabama
- West runners-up: LSU; Texas A&M

SEC Championship Game
- Champions: Alabama
- Finals MVP: Josh Jacobs, RB

Football seasons
- 2017 2019

2018 Southeastern Conference football standings
	Conf.			Overall
Team	W		L	W		L
Eastern Division
No. T–7 Georgia x	7	–	1	11	–	3
No. 12 Kentucky	5	–	3	10	–	3
No. T–7 Florida	5	–	3	10	–	3
South Carolina	4	–	4	7	–	6
Missouri	4	–	4	8	–	5
Vanderbilt	3	–	5	6	–	7
Tennessee	2	–	6	5	–	7
Western Division
No. 2 Alabama x$^	8	–	0	14	–	1
No. 16 Texas A&M	5	–	3	9	–	4
No. 6 LSU	5	–	3	10	–	3
Mississippi State*	4	–	4	8	–	5
Auburn	3	–	5	8	–	5
Ole Miss	1	–	7	5	–	7
Arkansas	0	–	8	2	–	10
Championship: Alabama 35, Georgia 28
^ – College Football Playoff participant; $ – Conference champion; x – Division champion/co-champions; * Mississippi State vacated four conference and eight total wins due to NCAA violations.; Rankings from AP Poll

The 2018 Southeastern Conference football season represents the 86th season of SEC football taking place during the 2018 NCAA Division I FBS football season. The season began on August 30 and will end with the SEC Championship Game, between Alabama and Georgia, on December 1. The SEC is a Power Five conference under the College Football Playoff format along with the Atlantic Coast Conference, the Big 12 Conference, the Big Ten Conference, and the Pac-12 Conference. For the 2018 season, the SEC has 14 teams divided into two divisions of seven each, named East and West.

== Preseason ==
=== Recruiting classes ===
National Rankings
Team	ESPN	Rivals	Scout	24/7	Total Signees
Alabama	#1	#1	#1	#1	29
Arkansas	#26	#24	#27	#27	27
Auburn	#9	#14	#11	#9	23
Florida	#13	#9	#10	#10	23
Georgia	#3	#3	#2	#3	25
Kentucky	#30	#26	#35	#31	24
LSU	#7	#8	#7	#7	23
Ole Miss	#36	#39	#29	#29	21
Mississippi State	#24	#27	#25	#24	24
Missouri	#54	#48	#40	#42	24
South Carolina	#19	#16	#21	#21	24
Tennessee	#15	#15	#16	#17	27
Texas A&M	#11	#10	#9	#12	27
Vanderbilt	#60	#57	#69	#65	20

=== SEC media days ===
The SEC conducted its annual media days at the Hyatt Regency Birmingham – The Wynfrey Hotel in Hoover, Alabama on July 16–19. The event commenced with a speech by commissioner Greg Sankey, and all 14 teams sent their head coaches and three selected players to speak with members of the media. The event along with all speakers and interviews were broadcast live on the SEC Network and streamed live on ESPN.com.

==== Preseason media polls ====
The SEC Media Days concluded with its annual preseason media polls. Since 1992, the credentialed media has gotten the preseason champion correct just six times. Only nine times has the preseason pick even made it to the SEC title game. Below are the results of the media poll with total points received next to each school and first-place votes in parentheses.

SEC Champion Voting

- Alabama (193)
- Georgia (69)
- Auburn (14)
- South Carolina (4)
- Florida (2)
- Mississippi State (1)
- Missouri (1)

West Division

1. Alabama (263) – 1971
2. Auburn (19) – 1664
3. Mississippi State (2) – 1239
4. Texas A&M – 1091
5. LSU – 1025
6. Ole Miss – 578
7. Arkansas – 412

East Division

1. Georgia (271) – 1977
2. South Carolina (8) – 1535
3. Florida (4) – 1441
4. Missouri – 1057
5. Kentucky (1) – 874
6. Tennessee (1) – 704
7. Vanderbilt – 392

- First place votes in ()

==== Preseason All-SEC Media ====
First Team Offense
Position	Player	Class	Team
QB	Drew Lock	SR	Missouri
RB	Damien Harris	SR	Alabama
RB	Benny Snell	JR	Kentucky
WR	A. J. Brown	JR	Ole Miss
WR	Deebo Samuel	RS SR	South Carolina
TE	Albert Okwuegbunam	RS SO	Missouri
OL	Jonah Williams	JR	Alabama
OL	Greg Little	JR	Ole Miss
OL	Martez Ivey	SR	Florida
OL	Trey Smith	SO	Tennessee
C	Ross Pierschbacher	SR	Alabama

First Team Defense
Position	Player	Class	Team
DL	Raekwon Davis	JR	Alabama
DL	CeCe Jefferson	SR	Florida
DL	Montez Sweat	SR	Mississippi State
DL	Jeffery Simmons	JR	Mississippi State
LB	Devin White	JR	LSU
LB	Anfernee Jennings	RS JR	Alabama
LB	Mack Wilson	JR	Alabama
DB	Deandre Baker	SR	Georgia
DB	Greedy Williams	SO	LSU
DB	J. R. Reed	JR	Georgia
DB	Deionte Thompson	RS JR	Alabama

First Team Special Teams
Position	Player	Class	Team
P	Corey Fatony	SR	Missouri
K	Rodrigo Blankenship	RS JR	Georgia
RS	Deebo Samuel	RS SR	South Carolina
AP	Deebo Samuel	RS SR	South Carolina

== Head coaches ==
School	Coach	Year
Alabama	Nick Saban	12th
Arkansas	Chad Morris	1st
Auburn	Gus Malzahn	6th
Florida	Dan Mullen	1st
Georgia	Kirby Smart	3rd
Kentucky	Mark Stoops	6th
LSU	Ed Orgeron	2nd
Mississippi State	Joe Moorhead	1st
Missouri	Barry Odom	3rd
Ole Miss	Matt Luke	2nd
South Carolina	Will Muschamp	3rd
Tennessee	Jeremy Pruitt	1st
Texas A&M	Jimbo Fisher	1st
Vanderbilt	Derek Mason	5th

== Rankings ==
Legend
	Increase in ranking
	Decrease in ranking
	Not ranked previous week
RV	Received votes but were not ranked in Top 25 of poll

		Pre	Wk 1	Wk 2	Wk 3	Wk 4	Wk 5	Wk 6	Wk 7	Wk 8	Wk 9	Wk 10	Wk 11	Wk 12	Wk 13	Wk 14	Final
Alabama	AP	1 (42)	1 (48)	1 (54)	1 (58)	1 (60)	1 (58)	1 (59)	1 (60)	1 (61)	1 (60)	1 (60)	1 (61)	1 (61)	1 (61)	1 (61)	2
Alabama	C	1 (61)	1 (59)	1 (59)	1 (60)	1 (61)	1 (61)	1 (61)	1 (61)	1 (60)	1 (62)	1 (63)	1 (64)	1 (63)	1 (63)	1 (62)	2
Alabama	CFP	Not released									1	1	1	1	1	1	
Arkansas	AP																
Arkansas	C		RV														
Arkansas	CFP	Not released															
Auburn	AP	9	7	7	9	10	8	21		RV	RV	RV	RV	RV			RV
Auburn	C	10	7	7	11	10	9	21	RV	RV	RV	RV	RV	RV			RV
Auburn	CFP	Not released										24					
Florida	AP	RV	25			RV	22	14	11	9	13	19	15	13	11	10	7
Florida	C	RV	25		RV	RV	RV	16	12	11	14	21	16	13	10	10	6
Florida	CFP	Not released									11	15	13	11	9	10	
Georgia	AP	3	3	3	2	2	2	2	8	7	6	5	5	5	4	6	7
Georgia	C	4	3	3	3	3	2	2	6	6	5	5	5	5	4	6	8
Georgia	CFP	Not released									6	5	5	5	4	5	
Kentucky	AP	RV		RV	RV	17	13	18	14	12	11	12	20	17	16	16	12
Kentucky	C	RV	RV	RV	RV	17	15	20	17	14	12	12	21	18	15	15	11
Kentucky	CFP	Not released									9	11	17	15	15	14	
LSU	AP	25	11	12	6	5	5	13	5	4	4	9	10	8	12	11	6
LSU	C	24	15	13	6	6	6	12	5	4	4	10	10	8	14	11	7
LSU	CFP	Not released									3	7	7	7	10	11	
Mississippi State	AP	18	18	16	14	23	RV	24	22	RV	21	18	25	22	20	18	RV
Mississippi State	C	18	18	16	14	19	RV	RV	RV	RV	21	15	23	20	19	18	25
Mississippi State	CFP	Not released									18	16	21	18	18	18	
Missouri	AP				RV	RV	RV							RV	RV	24	RV
Missouri	C			RV	RV	RV	RV					RV	RV	RV	RV	RV	RV
Missouri	CFP	Not released													24	23	
Ole Miss	AP		RV	RV													
Ole Miss	C																
Ole Miss	CFP	Not released															
South Carolina	AP	RV	24	RV	RV	RV		RV									
South Carolina	C	RV	24	RV	RV	RV	RV	RV	RV	RV	RV	RV		RV			
South Carolina	CFP	Not released															
Tennessee	AP																
Tennessee	C												RV				
Tennessee	CFP	Not released															
Texas A&M	AP	RV	RV	RV	22	RV	RV	22	17	16	25	RV	RV	RV	22	21	16
Texas A&M	C	RV	RV	RV	22	RV	RV	22	18	17	RV	RV	RV	RV	22	20	16
Texas A&M	CFP	Not released									20			22	19	19	
Vanderbilt	AP																
Vanderbilt	C			RV	RV												
Vanderbilt	CFP	Not released															

== Schedule ==
=== Regular season ===
Index to colors and formatting
Non-conference matchup; SEC member won
Non-conference matchup; SEC member lost
Conference matchup

All times Eastern time. SEC teams in bold.

Rankings reflect those of the AP poll for that week until week ten when CFP rankings are used.

==== Week One ====
Date	Time	Visiting team	Home team	Site	TV	Result	Attendance	Ref.
August 30	8:30 p.m.	Northwestern State	**Texas A&M**	Kyle Field • College Station, TX	SECN	**W** 59–7	95,855	
September 1	Noon	**Ole Miss**	Texas Tech	NRG Stadium • Houston, TX (AdvoCare Texas Kickoff)	ESPN	**W** 47–27	40,333	
September 1	Noon	Coastal Carolina	**South Carolina**	Williams–Brice Stadium • Columbia, SC	SECN	**W** 49–15	75,126	
September 1	3:30 p.m.	No. 22 (FCS) Austin Peay	No. 3 **Georgia**	Sanford Stadium • Athens, GA	ESPN	**W** 45–0	92,746	
September 1	3:30 p.m.	No. 6 Washington	No. 9 **Auburn**	Mercedes-Benz Stadium • Atlanta, GA (Chick-fil-A Kickoff Game)	ABC	**W** 21–16	70,103	
September 1	3:30 p.m.	Central Michigan	**Kentucky**	Kroger Field • Lexington, KY	ESPNU	**W** 35–20	49,138	
September 1	3:30 p.m.	**Tennessee**	No. 17 West Virginia	Bank of America Stadium • Charlotte, North Carolina (Belk Kickoff Game)	CBS	**L** 14–40	66,793	
September 1	4:00 p.m.	UT Martin	**Missouri**	Faurot Field • Columbia, MO	SECN	**W** 51–14	44,019	
September 1	4:00 p.m.	Eastern Illinois	**Arkansas**	Donald W. Reynolds Razorback Stadium • Fayetteville, AR	SECN	**W** 55–20	63,342	
September 1	7:30 p.m.	Charleston Southern	**Florida**	Ben Hill Griffin Stadium • Gainesville, FL	SECN	**W** 53–6	81,164	
September 1	7:30 p.m.	Stephen F. Austin	No. 18 **Mississippi State**	Davis Wade Stadium • Starkville, MS	ESPNU	**W** 63–6	54,289	
September 1	7:30 p.m.	Middle Tennessee	**Vanderbilt**	Vanderbilt Stadium • Nashville, TN	SECN	**W** 35–7	25,348	
September 1	8:00 p.m.	No. 1 **Alabama**	Louisville	Camping World Stadium • Orlando, FL (Camping World Kickoff)	ABC	**W** 51–14	57,280	
September 2	7:30 p.m.	No. 25 **LSU**	No. 8 Miami (FL)	AT&T Stadium • Arlington, TX (Advocare Classic)	ABC	**W** 33–17	68,841	
^{#}Rankings from AP Poll released prior to game. All times are in Eastern Time.

==== Week Two ====
Date	Time	Visiting team	Home team	Site	TV	Result	Attendance	Ref.
September 8	Noon	No. 18 **Mississippi State**	Kansas State	Bill Snyder Family Football Stadium • Manhattan, KS	ESPN	**W** 31–10	49,784	
September 8	Noon	Nevada	**Vanderbilt**	Vanderbilt Stadium • Nashville, TN	SECN	**W** 41–10	25,676	
September 8	3:30 p.m.	No. 3 **Georgia**	No. 24 **South Carolina**	Williams–Brice Stadium • Columbia, SC (rivalry)	CBS	**UGA** 41–17	83,140	
September 8	3:30 p.m.	Arkansas State	No. 1 **Alabama**	Bryant–Denny Stadium • Tuscaloosa, AL	ESPN2	**W** 57–7	100,495	
September 8	4:00 p.m.	Southern Illinois	**Ole Miss**	Vaught–Hemingway Stadium • Oxford, MS	SECN	**W** 76–41	53,339	
September 8	4:00 p.m.	East Tennessee State	**Tennessee**	Neyland Stadium • Knoxville, TN	SECN	**W** 59–3	96,464	
September 8	7:00 p.m.	No. 2 Clemson	**Texas A&M**	Kyle Field • College Station, TX	ESPN	**L** 26–28	104,794	
September 8	7:00 p.m.	Southeastern Louisiana	No. 11 **LSU**	Tiger Stadium • Baton Rouge, LA	ESPN2	**W** 31–0	96,883	
September 8	7:00 p.m.	Wyoming	**Missouri**	Faurot Field • Columbia, MO	ESPNU	**W** 40–13	50,820	
September 8	7:30 p.m.	**Arkansas**	Colorado State	Canvas Stadium • Fort Collins, CO	CBSSN	**L** 27–34	31,894	
September 8	7:30 p.m.	Alabama State	No. 7 **Auburn**	Jordan–Hare Stadium • Auburn, AL	SECN	**W** 63–9	84,806	
September 8	7:30 p.m.	**Kentucky**	No. 25 **Florida**	Ben Hill Griffin Stadium • Gainesville, FL	SECN	**UK** 27–16	80,651	
^{#}Rankings from AP Poll released prior to game. All times are in Eastern Time.

==== Week Three ====
Date	Time	Visiting team	Home team	Site	TV	Result	Attendance	Ref.
September 15	Noon	Middle Tennessee	No. 3 **Georgia**	Sanford Stadium • Athens, GA	ESPNews	**W** 49–7	92,746	
September 15	Noon	Murray State	**Kentucky**	Kroger Field • Lexington, KY	SECN	**W** 48–10	48,217	
September 15	Noon	UTEP	**Tennessee**	Neyland Stadium • Knoxville, TN	SECN	**W** 28–0	87,074	
September 15	2:30 p.m.	**Vanderbilt**	No. 8 Notre Dame	Notre Dame Stadium • South Bend, IN	NBC	**L** 17–22	77,622	
September 15	3:30 p.m.	No. 12 **LSU**	No. 7 **Auburn**	Jordan–Hare Stadium • Auburn, AL (Tiger Bowl)	CBS	**LSU** 22–21	86,787	
September 15	4:00 p.m.	Colorado State	**Florida**	Ben Hill Griffin Stadium • Gainesville, FL	SECN	**W** 48–10	80,021	
September 15	4:00 p.m.	North Texas	**Arkansas**	Donald W. Reynolds Razorback Stadium • Fayetteville, AR	SECN	**L** 17–44	62,355	
September 15	7:00 p.m.	No. 1 **Alabama**	**Ole Miss**	Vaught–Hemingway Stadium • Oxford, MS (rivalry)	ESPN	**ALA** 62–7	62,919	
September 15	7:30 p.m.	Louisiana–Monroe	**Texas A&M**	Kyle Field • College Station, TX	SECN	**W** 48–10	96,727	
September 15	7:30 p.m.	Louisiana	No. 16 **Mississippi State**	Davis Wade Stadium • Starkville, MS	ESPN2	**W** 56–10	56,505	
September 15	7:30 p.m.	**Missouri**	Purdue	Ross-Ade Stadium • West Lafayette, IN	BTN	**W** 40–37	48,103	
September 15^{[a]}	7:30 p.m.	Marshall	**South Carolina**	Williams–Brice Stadium • Columbia, SC	ESPNU	**Cancelled**	N/A	
^{#}Rankings from AP Poll released prior to game. All times are in Eastern Time.

==== Week Four ====
Date	Time	Visiting team	Home team	Site	TV	Result	Attendance	Ref.
September 22	Noon	No. 2 **Georgia**	**Missouri**	Faurot Field • Columbia, MO	ESPN	**UGA** 43–29	58,284	
September 22	Noon	Kent State	**Ole Miss**	Vaught–Hemingway Stadium • Oxford, MS	SECN	**W** 38–17	50,417	
September 22	3:30 p.m.	No. 22 **Texas A&M**	No. 1 **Alabama**	Bryant–Denny Stadium • Tuscaloosa, AL	CBS	**ALA** 45–23	101,821	
September 22	4:00 p.m.	**South Carolina**	**Vanderbilt**	Vanderbilt Stadium • Nashville, TN	SECN	**SCAR** 37–14	26,078	
September 22	7:00 p.m.	No. 14 **Mississippi State**	**Kentucky**	Kroger Field • Lexington, KY	ESPN2	**UK** 28–7	60,037	
September 22	7:00 p.m.	Louisiana Tech	No. 6 **LSU**	Tiger Stadium • Baton Rouge, LA	ESPNU	**W** 38–21	102,321	
September 22	7:00 p.m.	**Florida**	**Tennessee**	Neyland Stadium • Knoxville, TN (rivalry)	ESPN	**FLA** 47–21	100,027	
September 22	7:30 p.m.	**Arkansas**	No. 9 **Auburn**	Jordan–Hare Stadium • Auburn, AL	SECN	**AUB** 34–3	84,188	
^{#}Rankings from AP Poll released prior to game. All times are in Eastern Time.

==== Week Five ====
Date	Time	Visiting team	Home team	Site	TV	Result	Attendance	Ref.
September 29	Noon	Louisiana	No. 1 **Alabama**	Bryant–Denny Stadium • Tuscaloosa, AL	SECN	**W** 56–14	101,471	
September 29	Noon	**Arkansas**	**Texas A&M**	AT&T Stadium • Arlington, TX (rivalry)	ESPN	**TAMU** 24–17	55,383	
September 29	3:30 p.m.	**Tennessee**	No. 2 **Georgia**	Sanford Stadium • Athens, GA (rivalry)	CBS	**UGA** 38–12	92,246	
September 29†	4:00 p.m.	Southern Miss	No. 10 **Auburn**	Jordan–Hare Stadium • Auburn, AL	SECN	**W** 24–13	83,792	
September 29	4:00 p.m.	Tennessee State	**Vanderbilt**	Vanderbilt Stadium • Nashville, TN	SECN	**W** 31–27	27,340	
September 29	6:00 p.m.	**Florida**	No. 23 **Mississippi State**	Davis Wade Stadium • Starkville, MS	ESPN	**FLA** 13–6	61,406	
September 29	7:30 p.m.	**South Carolina**	No. 17 **Kentucky**	Kroger Field • Lexington, KY	SECN	**UK** 23–10	63,081	
September 29	9:00 p.m.	**Ole Miss**	No. 5 **LSU**	Tiger Stadium • Baton Rouge, LA (Magnolia Bowl)	ESPN	**LSU** 45–16	100,224	
^{#}Rankings from AP Poll released prior to game. All times are in Eastern Time.

==== Week Six ====
Date	Time	Visiting team	Home team	Site	TV	Result	Attendance	Ref.
October 6	Noon	No. 1 **Alabama**	**Arkansas**	Donald W. Reynolds Razorback Stadium • Fayetteville, AR	ESPN	**ALA** 65–31	64,974	
October 6	Noon	**Missouri**	**South Carolina**	Williams–Brice Stadium • Columbia, SC	SECN	**SCAR** 37–35	73,393	
October 6	3:30 p.m.	No. 5 **LSU**	No. 22 **Florida**	Ben Hill Griffin Stadium • Gainesville, FL (rivalry)	CBS	**FLA** 27–19	90,283	
October 6	4:00 p.m.	Louisiana–Monroe	**Ole Miss**	Vaught–Hemingway Stadium • Oxford, MS	SECN	**W** 70–21	52,875	
October 6	7:00 p.m.	No. 13 **Kentucky**	**Texas A&M**	Kyle Field • College Station, TX	ESPN	**TAMU** 20–14 ^{OT}	99,829	
October 6	7:30 p.m.	**Vanderbilt**	No. 2 **Georgia**	Sanford Stadium • Athens, GA (rivalry)	SECN	**UGA** 41–13	92,746	
October 6	7:30 p.m.	No. 8 **Auburn**	**Mississippi State**	Davis Wade Stadium • Starkville, MS	ESPN2	**MISS ST** 23–9	60,635	
^{#}Rankings from AP Poll released prior to game. All times are in Eastern Time.

==== Week Seven ====
Date	Time	Visiting team	Home team	Site	TV	Result	Attendance	Ref.
October 13	Noon	No. 14 **Florida**	**Vanderbilt**	Vanderbilt Stadium • Nashville, TN	ESPN	**FLA** 37–27	31,118	
October 13	Noon	**Tennessee**	No. 21 **Auburn**	Jordan–Hare Stadium • Auburn, AL (rivalry)	SECN	**TENN** 30–24	84,589	
October 13	3:30 p.m.	No. 2 **Georgia**	No. 13 **LSU**	Tiger Stadium • Baton Rouge, LA	CBS	**LSU** 36–16	102,321	
October 13	3:30 p.m	No. 22 **Texas A&M**	**South Carolina**	Williams–Brice Stadium • Columbia, SC	SECN	**TAMU** 26–23	76,871	
October 13	7:00 p.m.	**Missouri**	No. 1 **Alabama**	Bryant–Denny Stadium • Tuscaloosa, AL	ESPN	**ALA** 39–10	101,821	
October 13	7:30 p.m.	**Ole Miss**	**Arkansas**	War Memorial Stadium • Little Rock, AR (rivalry)	SECN	**MISS** 37–33	51,438	
^{#}Rankings from AP Poll released prior to game. All times are in Eastern Time.

==== Week Eight ====
Date	Time	Visiting team	Home team	Site	TV	Result	Attendance	Ref.
October 20	Noon	Tulsa	**Arkansas**	Donald W. Reynolds Razorback Stadium • Fayetteville, AR	SECN	**W** 23–0	56,691	
October 20	Noon	**Auburn**	**Ole Miss**	Vaught–Hemingway Stadium • Oxford, MS (rivalry)	ESPN	**AUB** 31–16	56,885	
October 20	3:30 p.m.	No. 1 **Alabama**	**Tennessee**	Neyland Stadium • Knoxville, TN (rivalry)	CBS	**ALA** 58–21	97,087	
October 20	4:00 p.m.	Memphis	**Missouri**	Farout Field • Columbia, MO	SECN	**W** 65–33	52,917	
October 20	7:00 p.m.	No. 22 **Mississippi State**	No. 5 **LSU**	Tiger Stadium • Baton Rouge, LA (rivalry)	ESPN	**LSU** 19–3	101,340	
October 20	7:30 p.m.	**Vanderbilt**	No. 14 **Kentucky**	Kroger Field • Lexington, KY (rivalry)	SECN	**UK** 14–7	54,269	
^{#}Rankings from AP Poll released prior to game. All times are in Eastern Time.

==== Week Nine ====
Date	Time	Visiting team	Home team	Site	TV	Result	Attendance	Ref.
October 27	Noon	**Vanderbilt**	**Arkansas**	Donald W. Razorback Stadium • Fayetteville, AR	SECN	**VANDY** 45–31	56,251	
October 27	3:30 p.m.	No. 7 **Georgia**	No. 9 **Florida**	EverBank Field • Jacksonville, FL (rivalry)	CBS	**UGA** 36–17	84,463	
October 27	4:00 p.m.	No. 12 **Kentucky**	**Missouri**	Farout Field • Columbia, MO	SECN	**UK** 15–14	53,397	
October 27	7:00 p.m.	No. 16 **Texas A&M**	**Mississippi State**	Davis Wade Stadium • Starkville, MS	ESPN	**MISS ST** 28–13	57,085	
October 27	7:30 p.m.	**Tennessee**	**South Carolina**	Williams–Brice Stadium • Columbia, SC	SECN	**SCAR** 27–24	80,614	
^{#}Rankings from AP Poll released prior to game. All times are in Eastern Time.

==== Week Ten ====
Date	Time	Visiting team	Home team	Site	TV	Result	Attendance	Ref.
November 3	Noon	No. 20 **Texas A&M**	**Auburn**	Jordan–Hare Stadium • Auburn, AL	ESPN	**AUB** 28–24	85,945	
November 3	Noon	**South Carolina**	**Ole Miss**	Vaught–Hemingway Stadium • Oxford, MS	SECN	**SCAR** 48–44	56,798	
November 3	3:30 p.m.	No. 6 **Georgia**	No. 9 **Kentucky**	Kroger Field • Lexington, KY	CBS	**UGA** 34–17	63,543	
November 3	4:00 p.m.	**Missouri**	No. 11 **Florida**	Ben Hill Griffin Stadium • Gainesville, FL	SECN	**MIZZOU** 38–17	80,017	
November 3	4:00 p.m.	Charlotte	**Tennessee**	Neyland Stadium • Knoxville, TN	SECN	**W** 14–3	86,753	
November 3	7:30 p.m.	Louisiana Tech	No. 18 **Mississippi State**	Davis Wade Stadium • Starkville, MS	SECN	**W** 45–3	58,709	
November 3	8:00 p.m.	No. 1 **Alabama**	No. 3 **LSU**	Tiger Stadium • Baton Rouge, LA (rivalry)	CBS	**ALA** 29–0	102,321	
^{#}Rankings from College Football Playoff. All times are in Eastern Time.

==== Week Eleven ====
Date	Time	Visiting team	Home team	Site	TV	Result	Attendance	Ref.
November 10	Noon	**South Carolina**	No. 15 **Florida**	Ben Hill Griffin Stadium • Gainesville, FL	ESPN	**FLA** 35–31	82,696	
November 10	Noon	**Vanderbilt**	**Missouri**	Farout Field • Columbia, MO	SECN	**MIZZOU** 33–28	48,342	
November 10	Noon	**Ole Miss**	**Texas A&M**	Kyle Field • College Station, TX	CBS	**TAMU** 38–24	102,618	
November 10	3:30 p.m.	No. 16 **Mississippi State**	No. 1 **Alabama**	Bryant–Denny Stadium • Tuscaloosa, AL (rivalry)	CBS	**ALA** 24–0	101,821	
November 10	3:30 p.m.	No. 11 **Kentucky**	**Tennessee**	Neyland Stadium • Knoxville, TN (rivalry)	SECN	**TENN** 24–7	95,258	
November 10	7:00 p.m.	No. 24 **Auburn**	No. 5 **Georgia**	Sanford Stadium • Athens, GA (rivalry)	ESPN	**UGA** 27–10	92,746	
November 10	7:30 p.m.	No. 7 **LSU**	**Arkansas**	Donald W. Reynolds Razorback Stadium • Fayetteville, AR (rivalry)	SECN	**LSU** 24–17	64,135	
^{#}Rankings from College Football Playoff. All times are in Eastern Time.

==== Week Twelve ====
Date	Time	Visiting team	Home team	Site	TV	Result	Attendance	Ref.
November 17	Noon	The Citadel	No. 1 **Alabama**	Bryant–Denny Stadium • Tuscaloosa, AL	SECN	**W** 50–17	101,681	
November 17	Noon	Middle Tennessee	No. 17 **Kentucky**	Kroger Field • Lexington, KY	SECN	**W** 34–23	47,535	
November 17	Noon	Idaho	No. 13 **Florida**	Ben Hill Griffin Stadium • Gainesville, FL	ESPNU	**W** 63–10	81,467	
November 17	Noon	**Arkansas**	No. 21 **Mississippi State**	Davis Wade Stadium • Starkville, MS	ESPN	**MISS ST** 52–6	57,772	
November 17	3:30 p.m.	**Missouri**	**Tennessee**	Neyland Stadium • Knoxville, TN	CBS	**MIZZOU** 50–17	88,224	
November 17	4:00 p.m.	UMass	No. 5 **Georgia**	Sanford Stadium • Athens, GA	SECN	**W** 66–27	92,746	
November 17	4:00 p.m.	Liberty	**Auburn**	Jordan–Hare Stadium • Auburn, AL	SECN	**W** 53–0	81,129	
November 17	7:00 p.m.	UAB	**Texas A&M**	Kyle Field • College Station, TX	ESPN2	**W** 41–20	97,584	
November 17	7:30 p.m.	Rice	No. 7 **LSU**	Tiger Stadium • Baton Rouge, LA	ESPNU	**W** 42–10	100,323	
November 17	7:30 p.m.	**Ole Miss**	**Vanderbilt**	Vanderbilt Stadium • Nashville, TN (rivalry)	SECN	**VANDY** 36–29 ^{OT}	24,866	
November 17	7:30 p.m.	Chattanooga	**South Carolina**	Williams–Brice Stadium • Columbia, SC	SECN	**W** 49–9	72,832	
^{#}Rankings from College Football Playoff. All times are in Eastern Time.

==== Week Thirteen ====
Date	Time	Visiting team	Home team	Site	TV	Result	Attendance	Ref.
November 22	7:30 p.m.	No. 18 **Mississippi State**	**Ole Miss**	Vaught–Hemingway Stadium • Oxford, MS (Egg Bowl)	ESPN	**MISS ST** 35–3	56,561	
November 23	2:30 p.m.	**Arkansas**	**Missouri**	Faurot Field • Columbia, MO (Battle Line Rivalry)	CBS	**MIZZOU** 38–0	52,482	
November 24	Noon	No. 11 **Florida**	Florida State	Doak Campbell Stadium • Tallahassee, FL (Sunshine Showdown)	ABC	**W** 41–14	71,953	
November 24	Noon	Georgia Tech	No. 5 **Georgia**	Sanford Stadium • Athens, GA (Clean, Old-Fashioned Hate)	SECN	**W** 45–21	92,746	
November 24	3:30 p.m.	**Auburn**	No. 1 **Alabama**	Bryant–Denny Stadium • Tuscaloosa, AL (Iron Bowl)	CBS	**ALA** 52–21	101,821	
November 24	4:00 p.m.	**Tennessee**	**Vanderbilt**	Vanderbilt Stadium • Nashville, TN (rivalry)	SECN	**VANDY** 38–13	35,887	
November 24	7:00 p.m.	**South Carolina**	No. 2 Clemson	Memorial Stadium • Clemson, SC (Palmetto Bowl)	ESPN	**L** 35–56	81,436	
November 24	7:00 p.m.	No. 15 **Kentucky**	Louisville	Cardinal Stadium • Louisville, KY (Governor's Cup)	ESPN2	**W** 56–10	49,988	
November 24	7:30 p.m.	No. 7 **LSU**	No. 22 **Texas A&M**	Kyle Field • College Station, TX (rivalry)	SECN	**TAMU** 74–72 ^{7OT}	101,501	
^{#}Rankings from College Football Playoff. All times are in Eastern Time.

==== Week Fourteen ====
Date	Time	Visiting team	Home team	Site	TV	Result	Attendance	Ref.
December 1^{[a]}	Noon	Akron	**South Carolina**	Williams–Brice Stadium • Columbia, SC	ESPN	**W** 28–3	53,420	
^{#}Rankings from College Football Playoff. All times are in Eastern Time.

=== Championship game ===
Date	Time	Visiting team	Home team	Site	TV	Result	Attendance	Ref.
December 1	4:00 pm	No. 1 **Alabama**	No. 4 **Georgia**	Mercedes-Benz Stadium • Atlanta, GA (rivalry)	CBS	**ALA** 35–28	77,141	
^{#}Rankings from College Football Playoff. All times are in Eastern Time.

^{^[a]}The game between South Carolina and Marshall, originally scheduled for September 15, 2018, was canceled in anticipation of Hurricane Florence. The Gamecocks scheduled Akron to replace Marshall, as Akron had their game against Nebraska canceled due to inclement weather earlier in the year.

== Head to head matchups ==
Head to head
Team	Alabama	Arkansas	Auburn	Florida	Georgia	Kentucky	LSU	Missouri	Mississippi State	Ole Miss	South Carolina	Tennessee	Texas A&M	Vanderbilt
Alabama	—	0-1	0-1				0-1	0-1	0-1	0-1		0-1	0-1	
Arkansas	1-0	—	1-0				1-0	1-0	1-0	1-0			1-0	1-0
Auburn	1-0	0-1	—		1-0		1-0		1-0	0-1		1-0	0-1	
Florida				—	1-0	1-0	0-1	1-0	0-1		0-1	0-1		0-1
Georgia			0-1	0-1	—	0-1	1-0	0-1			0-1	0-1		0-1
Kentucky				0-1	1-0	—		0-1	0-1		0-1	1-0	1-0	0-1
LSU	1-0	0-1	0-1	1-0	0-1		—		0-1	0-1			1-0	
Missouri	1-0	0-1		0-1	1-0	1-0		—			1-0	0-1		0-1
Mississippi State	1-0	0-1	0-1	1-0		1-0	1-0		—	0-1			0-1	
Ole Miss	1-0	0-1	1-0				1-0		1-0	—	1-0		1-0	1-0
South Carolina				1-0	1-0	1-0		0-1		0-1	—	0-1	1-0	0-1
Tennessee	1-0		0-1	1-0	1-0	0-1		1-0			1-0	—		1-0
Texas A&M	1-0	0-1	1-0			0-1	0-1		1-0	0-1	0-1		—	
Vanderbilt		0-1		1-0	1-0	1-0		1-0		0-1	1-0	0-1		—

== SEC vs other conferences ==
=== SEC vs. Power 5 matchups ===
This is a list of teams considered by the SEC as "Power Five" teams for purposes of meeting league requirements that each member play at least one "power" team in non-conference play. In addition to the SEC, the NCAA officially considers all football members of the ACC, Big 10, Big 12 and Pac-12, plus independent Notre Dame (a full but non-football ACC member), as "Power Five" teams.

All rankings are from the current AP Poll at the time of the game.

Date	Visitor	Home	Site	Significance	Score
September 1	No. 1 Alabama	Louisville	Camping World Stadium • Orlando	Camping World Kickoff	W 51–14
September 1	Ole Miss	Texas Tech	NRG Stadium • Houston, TX	AdvoCare Texas Kickoff	W 47–27
September 1	Tennessee	No. 17 West Virginia	Bank of America Stadium • Charlotte, NC	Belk Kickoff Game	L 14–40
September 1	No. 8 Miami (FL)	No. 25 LSU	AT&T Stadium • Arlington, TX	Advocare Classic	W 33–17
September 1	No. 6 Washington	No. 9 Auburn	Mercedes-Benz Stadium • Atlanta, GA	Chick-fil-A Kickoff Game	W 21–16
September 8	Clemson	Texas A&M	Kyle Field • College Station, TX		L 26–28
September 8	Mississippi State	Kansas State	Bill Snyder Family Football Stadium • Manhattan, KS		W 31–10
September 15	Vanderbilt	Notre Dame	Notre Dame Stadium • South Bend, IN		L 17–22
September 15	Missouri	Purdue	Ross–Ade Stadium • West Lafayette, IN		W 40–37
November 24	Georgia Tech	No. 5 Georgia	Sanford Stadium • Athens, GA	Clean, Old-Fashioned Hate	W 45–21
November 24	South Carolina	No. 2 Clemson	Memorial Stadium • Clemson, SC	Palmetto Bowl	L 35–56
November 24	No. 17 Kentucky	Louisville	Cardinal Stadium • Louisville, KY	Governor's Cup	W 56–10
November 24	No. 13 Florida	Florida State	Doak Campbell Stadium • Tallahassee, FL	Florida–Florida State football rivalry	W 41–14

=== SEC records vs other conferences ===
2018-19 records against non-conference foes:

Regular Season

Power 5 Conferences	Record
ACC	5–2
Big 12	2–1
Big Ten	1–0
Notre Dame	0–1
Pac 12	1–0
Power 5 Total	9–4
Other FBS Conferences	Record
American	2–0
C-USA	10–1
Independents (Excluding BYU and Notre Dame)	2–0
MAC	3–0
Mountain West	3–1
Sun Belt	6–0
Other FBS Total	26–2
FCS Opponents	Record
Football Championship Subdivision	15–0
Total Non-Conference Record	50–6

Post Season

Power Conferences 5	Record
ACC	1–2
Big 12	1–3
Big Ten	3–1
Power 5 Total	5–6
Other FBS Conferences	Record
American	1–0
Other FBS Total	1–0
Total Bowl Record	6–6

== Postseason ==
=== Bowl games ===
(Rankings from final CFP Poll; All times Eastern)

Date	Time	Bowl Game	Site	TV	SEC Team	Opponent	Result
January 7, 2019	8:00 p.m.	CFP National Championship	Levi's Stadium • Santa Clara, CA	ESPN	No. 1 Alabama (14–0)	No. 2 Clemson (14–0)	L 16–44
January 1, 2019	8:30 p.m.	Sugar Bowl (New Year's Six)	Mercedes-Benz Superdome • New Orleans, LA	ESPN	No. 5 Georgia (11–2)	No. 15 Texas (9–4)	L 21–28
January 1, 2019	1:00 p.m.	Fiesta Bowl (New Year's Six)	State Farm Stadium • Glendale, AZ	ESPN	No. 11 LSU (9–3)	No. 8 UCF (12–0)	W 40–32
January 1, 2019	1:00 p.m.	Citrus Bowl	Camping World Stadium • Orlando, FL	ABC	No. 14 Kentucky (9–3)	No. 12 Penn State (9–3)	W 27–24
January 1, 2019	12:00 p.m.	Outback Bowl	Raymond James Stadium • Tampa, FL	ESPN2	No. 18 Mississippi State (8–4)	Iowa (8–4)	L 22–27
December 31, 2018	7:30 p.m.	Gator Bowl	TIAA Bank Field • Jacksonville, FL	ESPN	No. 19 Texas A&M (8–4)	NC State (9–3)	W 52–13
December 31, 2018	3:45 p.m.	Liberty Bowl	Liberty Bowl • Memphis, TN	ESPN	No. 23 Missouri (8–4)	Oklahoma State (6–6)	L 33–38
December 29, 2018	8:00 p.m.	Orange Bowl (CFP Semifinal)	Hard Rock Stadium • Miami Gardens, FL	ESPN	No. 1 Alabama (13–0)	No. 4 Oklahoma (12–1)	W 45–34
December 29, 2018	12:00 p.m.	Peach Bowl (New Year's Six)	Mercedes-Benz Stadium • Atlanta, GA	ESPN	No. 10 Florida (9–3)	No. 7 Michigan (10–2)	W 41–15
December 29, 2018	12:00 p.m.	Belk Bowl	Bank of America Stadium • Charlotte, NC	ESPN	South Carolina (7–5)	Virginia (7–5)	L 0–28
December 28, 2018	1:30 p.m.	Music City Bowl	Nissan Stadium • Nashville, TN	ESPN	Auburn (7–5)	Purdue (6–6)	W 63–14
December 27, 2018	9:00 p.m.	Texas Bowl	NRG Stadium • Houston, TX	ESPN	Vanderbilt (6–6)	Baylor (6–6)	L 38–45

== Awards and honors ==
=== Player of the week honors ===
Week	Offensive			Defensive			Offensive Line			Defensive Line			Specialist			Freshman		
Week	Player	Team	Position	Player	Team	Position	Player	Team	Position	Player	Team	Position	Player	Team	Position	Player	Team	Position
Week 1 (Sept. 4)	Scottie Phillips	Ole Miss	RB	Darrell Williams; Jacob Phillips	Auburn; LSU	LB	Cory Little	Ole Miss	OL	Nick Coe; Quinnen Williams	Auburn; Alabama	DL	Luke Logan; Cole Tracy	Ole Miss; LSU	PK	Jaylen Waddle	Alabama	WR/PR
Week 2 (Sept. 10)	Kylin Hill	Mississippi State	RB	Josh Allen	Kentucky	LB	Jervontius Stallings	Kentucky	OG	Montez Sweat	Mississippi State	DE	Rodrigo Blankenship	Georgia	PK	Bryce Thompson	Tennessee	DB
Week 3 (Sept. 17)	Joe Burrow	LSU	QB	Christian Miller	Alabama	LB	Elgton Jenkins	Mississippi State	C	Jabari Zuniga	Florida	DL	Cole Tracy (2)	LSU	PK	Jalen Knox	Missouri	WR
Week 4 (Sept. 24)	Tua Tagovailoa	Alabama	QB	Josh Allen (2)	Kentucky	LB	Jervontius Stallings (2)	Kentucky	OG	Isaiah Buggs; Javon Kinlaw	Alabama; South California	DE; DT	Noah Igbinoghene	Auburn	KR	Dameon Pierce	Florida	RB
Week 5 (Oct. 1)	Joe Burrow (2)	LSU	QB	Josh Allen (3)	Kentucky	LB	George Asafo-Adjei	Kentucky	OT	Jachai Polite	Florida	DL	Braden Mann	Texas A&M	P	Evan McPherson	Florida	PK
Week 6 (Oct. 8)	Nick Fitzgerald	Mississippi State	QB	Vosean Joseph	Florida	LB	Ross Pierschbacher	Alabama	C	Montez Sweat (2)	Mississippi State	DE	Braden Mann (2); Parker White	Texas A&M; South Carolina	P PK	Jaycee Horn	South Carolina	DB
Week 7 (Oct. 15)	Jordan Ta'amu; Jarrett Guarantano	Ole Miss; Tennessee	QB	Devin White	LSU	LB	Jedrick Wills	Alabama	RT	Kyle Phillips	Tennessee	DE	Cole Tracy (3)	LSU	PK	Evan McPherson (2)	Florida	PK
Week 8 (Oct. 22)	Tua Tagovailoa (2)	Alabama	QB	Grant Delpit	LSU	S	George Asafo-Adjei (2)	Kentucky	OT	Nick Coe (2)	Auburn	DL	Cole Tracy (4)	LSU	PK	Jalen Knox (2)	Missouri	WR
Week 9 (Oct. 27)	Nick Fitzgerald; Jake Fromm	Mississippi State; Georgia	QB	Josh Allen (4)	Kentucky	LB	Justin Skule	Vanderbilt	OT	D. J. Wonnum	South Carolina	DL	Lynn Bowden	Kentucky	KR	Dylan Wonnum	South Carolina	OL
Week 10 (Nov. 4)	Drew Lock; D'Andre Swift	Missouri; Georgia	QB; RB	Quinnen Williams	Alabama	DT	Jonah Williams; Andrew Thomas	Alabama; Georgia	OT; OL	Nick Coe (3)	Auburn	DL	Deebo Samuel	South Carolina	WR (KR)	Seth Williams	Auburn	WR
Week 11 (Nov. 10)	D'Andre Swift (2); Trayveon Williams	Georgia; Texas A&M	RB	Darrell Taylor	Tennessee	LB	Martez Ivey	Florida	OL	Quinnen Williams (2)	Alabama	DL	Braden Mann (3)	Texas A&M	P	Daniel Parker	Missouri	TE
Week 12 (Nov. 19)	Drew Lock (2)	Missouri	QB	Johnathan Abram; Josh Paschal	Mississippi State; Kentucky	S LB	Deion Calhoun	Mississippi State	OG	Dayo Odeyingbo	Vanderbilt	DL	Luke Logan	Ole Miss	PK	Justin Fields	Georgia	QB
Week 13 (Nov. 25)	Kyle Shurmur; Tua Tagovailoa (3)	Vanderbilt; Alabama	QB	Jordan Elliott; Devin White (2)	Missouri; LSU	DT; LB	Erik McCoy; Elgton Jenkins (2)	Texas A&M; Mississippi State	C	Jeffery Simmons	Mississippi State	DL	Braden Mann (4)	Texas A&M	P	C.J. Bolar	Vanderbilt	WR

=== SEC Individual Awards ===
The following individuals won the conference's annual player and coach awards:

- Offensive Player of the Year: Tua Tagovailoa, QB, Alabama
- Defensive Player of the Year: Josh Allen, LB, Kentucky
- Coach of the Year: Mark Stoops, Kentucky
- Special Teams Player of the Year: Braden Mann, P/K, Texas A&M
- Freshman Player of the Year: Jaylen Waddle, WR, Alabama
- Newcomer Player of the Year: Ke'Shawn Vaughn, RB, Vanderbilt
- Jacobs Blocking Trophy: Jonah Allen, OL, Alabama
- Scholar-Athlete Player of the Year: Hale Hentges, TE, Alabama

== Home game attendance ==
Team	Stadium	Capacity	Game 1	Game 2	Game 3	Game 4	Game 5	Game 6	Game 7	Total	Average	% of Capacity
Alabama	Bryant–Denny Stadium	101,821	100,495	101,821	101,471	101,821	101,821	101,681	101,821	710,931	101,562	99.75%
Arkansas	Razorback Stadium	76,212	63,342	62,355	64,974	51,438^{A}	56,691	56,251	64,135	419,186	59,884	81.97%
Auburn	Jordan–Hare Stadium	87,451	84,806	86,787	84,188	83,792	84,589	85,945	81,129	591,236	84,462	96.58%
Florida	Ben Hill Griffin Stadium	88,548	81,164	80,651	80,021	90,283	80,017	82,696	81,467	576,299	82,328	92.98%
Georgia	Sanford Stadium	92,746	92,746	92,746	92,746	92,746	92,746	92,746	92,746	649,222	92,746	100%
Kentucky	Kroger Field	61,000	49,138	48,217	60,037	63,081	54,269	63,543	47,535	385,820	55,117	90.36
LSU	Tiger Stadium	102,321	96,883	102,321	100,224	102,321	101,340	102,321	100,323	705,733	100,819	98.53%
Mississippi State	Davis Wade Stadium	61,337	54,289	56,505	61,406	60,635	57,085	58,709	57,772	406,401	58,057	94.65%
Missouri	Faurot Field	60,168	44,019	50,820	58,284	52,917	53,397	48,342	52,482	360,261	51,466	85.54%
Ole Miss	Vaught–Hemingway Stadium	64,038	53,339	62,919	50,417	52,875	56,885	56,798	56,561	389,794	55,685	86.96%
South Carolina	Williams–Brice Stadium	80,250	75,126	83,140	73,393	76,871	80,614	72,832	53,420	515,396	73,628	91.75%
Tennessee	Neyland Stadium	102,455	96,464	87,074	100,027	97,087	86,753	95,258	88,224	650,887	92,984	90.76%
Texas A&M	Kyle Field	102,512	95,855	104,794	96,727	99,829	102,618	97,584	101,501	698,908	99,844	97.40%
Vanderbilt	Vanderbilt Stadium	40,550	25,348	25,676	26,078	27,340	31,118	24,866	35,887	196,313	28,045	69.16%

^AGame played at Arkansas' secondary home stadium War Memorial Stadium, capacity: 54,120.
