= 2018 Tennessee Tech Golden Eagles football team =

American college football season

2018 Tennessee Tech Golden Eagles football
- Conference: Ohio Valley Conference
- Record: 1–10 (1–7 OVC)
- Head coach: Dewayne Alexander (1st season)
- Offensive coordinator: Tre Lamb (1st season)
- Defensive coordinator: Donnie Suber (1st season)
- Home stadium: Tucker Stadium

2018 Ohio Valley Conference football standings
	Conf.			Overall
Team	W		L	W		L
No. 10 Jacksonville State $^	7	–	1	8	–	3
No. 15 Southeast Missouri State ^	6	–	2	8	–	3
Eastern Kentucky	5	–	2	7	–	4
Murray State	5	–	3	5	–	6
Tennessee State	3	–	4	4	–	5
Eastern Illinois	3	–	5	3	–	8
Austin Peay	3	–	5	5	–	6
UT Martin	2	–	6	2	–	9
Tennessee Tech	1	–	7	1	–	10
$ – Conference champion; ^ – FCS playoff participant; Rankings from STATS Poll

The 2018 Tennessee Tech Golden Eagles football team represented Tennessee Technological University as a member of Ohio Valley Conference (OVC) during the 2018 NCAA Division I FCS football season. Led by first-year head coach Dewayne Alexander, the Golden Eagles compiled an overall record of 1–10 overall with a mark of 1–7 in conference play, placing last out of nine teams in the OVC. Tennessee Tech played home games at Tucker Stadium in Cookeville, Tennessee.

== Preseason ==
=== OVC media poll ===
On July 20, 2018, the media covering the OVC released their preseason poll with the Golden Eagles predicted to finish in last place. On July 23, the OVC released their coaches poll with the Golden Eagles also predicted to finish in last place.

=== Preseason All-OVC team ===
The Golden Eagles had two players selected to the preseason all-OVC team.

Defense

Tim Collins – DL

Specialists

Nick Madonia – P

== Schedule ==
Date	Time	Opponent	Site	TV	Result	Attendance
August 30	6:00 p.m.	at Chattanooga*	Finley Stadium; Chattanooga, TN	ESPN3	L 10–34	9,020
September 6	6:00 p.m.	No. 7 Kennesaw State*	Tucker Stadium; Cookeville, TN	ESPNU	L 10–49	4,118
September 13	7:00 p.m.	at Utah State*	Maverik Stadium; Logan, UT	MW Net	L 12–73	15,011
September 22	6:00 p.m.	at No. 10 Jacksonville State	Burgess–Snow Field at JSU Stadium; Jacksonville, AL	ESPN+	L 20–48	17,403
September 29	6:00 p.m.	Eastern Illinois	Tucker Stadium; Cookeville, TN	ESPN+	L 38–52	7,184
October 6	6:00 p.m.	Southeast Missouri State	Tucker Stadium; Cookeville, TN	ESPN+	L 38–70	4,404
October 20	4:30 p.m.	at Tennessee State	Nissan Stadium; Nashville, TN (Sgt. York Trophy)	ESPN+	L 14–41	17,283
October 27	4:00 p.m.	at Austin Peay	Fortera Stadium; Clarksville, TN (Sgt. York Trophy)	ESPN+	L 10–41	7,236
November 3	1:30 p.m.	Murray State	Tucker Stadium; Cookeville, TN	ESPN+	W 27–24	8,788
November 10	2:00 p.m.	at UT Martin	Graham Stadium; Martin, TN (Sgt. York Trophy)	ESPN+	L 13–38	2,736
November 17	1:30 p.m.	Eastern Kentucky	Tucker Stadium; Cookeville, TN	ESPN+	L 6–37	4,559
*Non-conference game; Rankings from STATS Poll released prior to the game; All times are in Central time

== Game summaries ==
=== At Chattanooga ===
	1	2	3	4	Total
Golden Eagles	0	7	3	0	10
Mocs	6	7	21	0	34

=== Kennesaw State ===
	1	2	3	4	Total
No. 7 Owls	7	14	21	7	49
Golden Eagles	3	0	0	7	10

=== At Utah State ===
	1	2	3	4	Total
Golden Eagles	3	3	3	3	12
Aggies	17	28	7	21	73

=== At Jacksonville State ===
	1	2	3	4	Total
Golden Eagles	3	3	7	7	20
No. 10 Gamecocks	10	14	7	17	48

=== Eastern Illinois ===
	1	2	3	4	Total
Panthers	7	14	10	21	52
Golden Eagles	10	0	7	21	38

=== Southeast Missouri State ===
	1	2	3	4	Total
Redhawks	21	28	14	7	70
Golden Eagles	3	14	7	14	38

=== At Tennessee State ===
	1	2	3	4	Total
Golden Eagles	0	0	0	14	14
Tigers	17	10	14	0	41

=== At Austin Peay ===
	1	2	3	4	Total
Golden Eagles	0	3	7	0	10
Governors	6	14	21	0	41

=== Murray State ===
	1	2	3	4	Total
Racers	7	0	10	7	24
Golden Eagles	14	3	7	3	27

=== At UT Martin ===
	1	2	3	4	Total
Golden Eagles	0	13	0	0	13
Skyhawks	14	14	3	7	38

=== Eastern Kentucky ===
	1	2	3	4	Total
Colonels	0	13	7	17	37
Golden Eagles	0	3	3	0	6
