= 1991 Southern Illinois Salukis football team =

American college football season

1991 Southern Illinois Salukis football
- Conference: Gateway Collegiate Athletic Conference
- Record: 7–4 (4–2 GCAC)
- Head coach: Bob Smith (3rd season)
- Home stadium: McAndrew Stadium

1991 Gateway Collegiate Athletic Conference football standings
	Conf.					Overall
Team	W		L		T	W		L		T
No. 4 Northern Iowa $^	5	–	1	–	0	11	–	2	–	0
No. 14 Western Illinois ^	4	–	2	–	0	7	–	4	–	1
Southern Illinois	4	–	2	–	0	7	–	4	–	0
Southwest Missouri State	3	–	3	–	0	6	–	4	–	1
Indiana State	2	–	4	–	0	5	–	6	–	0
Eastern Illinois	2	–	4	–	0	4	–	7	–	0
Illinois State	1	–	5	–	0	5	–	6	–	0
$ – Conference champion; ^ – NCAA Division I-AA playoff participant; Rankings from NCAA Division I-AA Football Committee poll

The 1991 Southern Illinois Salukis football team was an American football team that represented Southern Illinois University (now known as Southern Illinois University Carbondale) in the Gateway Collegiate Athletic Conference (GCAC) during the 1991 NCAA Division I-AA football season. Under third-year head coach Bob Smith, the team compiled a 7–4 record (4–2 against conference opponents) and tied for second place in the conference. The team played its home games at McAndrew Stadium in Carbondale, Illinois.

== Schedule ==
Date	Time	Opponent	Rank	Site	Result	Attendance	Source
August 31		at Southeast Missouri State*		Houck Stadium; Cape Girardeau, MO	W 28–27	8,265	
September 7		at Murray State*		Roy Stewart Stadium; Murray, KY	W 31–27	6,746	
September 14		at Austin Peay*		Municipal Stadium; Clarksville, TN	W 21–17	4,103	
September 21	1:30 p.m.	No. 5 Northern Iowa		McAndrew Stadium; Carbondale, IL	W 21–20	12,200	
September 28		No. 19 Illinois State		McAndrew Stadium; Carbondale, IL	W 14–11	16,500	
October 5		No. 19 Southwest Missouri State	No. 15	McAndrew Stadium; Carbondale, IL	L 13–17	13,700	
October 12		at Troy State*		Veterans Memorial Stadium; Troy, AL	L 13–30	5,500	
October 19		at No. 17 Western Illinois		Hanson Field; Macomb, IL	L 20–21	10,225	
October 26		at Indiana State		Memorial Stadium; Terre Haute, IN	W 30–23	3,250	
November 2		Eastern Illinois		McAndrew Stadium; Carbondale, IL	W 31–30	6,500	
November 9		at Louisiana Tech*		Joe Aillet Stadium; Ruston, LA	L 16–48	15,650	
*Non-conference game; Rankings from NCAA Division I-AA Football Committee Poll released prior to the game; All times are in Central time
