= 2018 Eastern Kentucky Colonels football team =

American college football season

2018 Eastern Kentucky Colonels football
- Conference: Ohio Valley Conference
- Record: 7–4 (5–2 OVC)
- Head coach: Mark Elder (3rd season)
- Offensive coordinator: Tommy Zagorski (1st season)
- Defensive coordinator: Kurt Maddix (3rd season)
- Home stadium: Roy Kidd Stadium

2018 Ohio Valley Conference football standings
	Conf.			Overall
Team	W		L	W		L
No. 10 Jacksonville State $^	7	–	1	8	–	3
No. 15 Southeast Missouri State ^	6	–	2	8	–	3
Eastern Kentucky	5	–	2	7	–	4
Murray State	5	–	3	5	–	6
Tennessee State	3	–	4	4	–	5
Eastern Illinois	3	–	5	3	–	8
Austin Peay	3	–	5	5	–	6
UT Martin	2	–	6	2	–	9
Tennessee Tech	1	–	7	1	–	10
$ – Conference champion; ^ – FCS playoff participant; Rankings from STATS Poll

The 2018 Eastern Kentucky Colonels football team represented Eastern Kentucky University during the 2018 NCAA Division I FCS football season. They were led by third-year head coach Mark Elder and played their home games at Roy Kidd Stadium as a member of the Ohio Valley Conference. They finished the season 7–4, 5–2 in OVC play to finish in third place.

== Preseason ==
=== OVC media poll ===
On July 20, 2018, the media covering the OVC released their preseason poll with the Colonels predicted to finish in sixth place. On July 23, the OVC released their coaches poll with the Colonels predicted to finish in fifth place.

=== Preseason All-OVC team ===
The Colonels had three players selected to the preseason all-OVC team.

Offense

Dan Paul – TE

Aaron Patrick – DL

Specialists

LJ Scott – KR

== Schedule ==
Date	Time	Opponent	Site	TV	Result	Attendance
August 30	7:00 p.m.	Morehead State*	Roy Kidd Stadium; Richmond, KY (Old Hawg Rifle)	ESPN+	W 49–23	10,230
September 8	6:30 p.m.	at Marshall*	Joan C. Edwards Stadium; Huntington, WV	ESPN+	L 16–32	24,304
September 15	4:00 p.m.	at Bowling Green*	Doyt Perry Stadium; Bowling Green, OH	ESPN3	L 35–42	17,542
September 22	4:00 p.m.	Southeast Missouri State	Roy Kidd Stadium; Richmond, KY	ESPN+	W 23–14	7,720
October 6	4:00 p.m.	No. 8 Jacksonville State	Roy Kidd Stadium; Richmond, KY	ESPN+	L 7–56	6,820
October 13	3:00 p.m.	at UT Martin	Graham Stadium; Martin, TN	ESPN+	W 35–34	1,769
October 20	3:00 p.m.	Murray State^{†}	Roy Kidd Stadium; Richmond, KY	ESPN+	L 6–34	10,440
October 27	1:00 p.m.	Eastern Illinois	Roy Kidd Stadium; Richmond, KY	ESPN+	W 31–23	4,400
November 3	5:00 p.m.	at Austin Peay	Fortera Stadium; Clarksville, TN	ESPN+	W 17–13	6,094
November 10	1:00 p.m.	Robert Morris*	Roy Kidd Stadium; Richmond, KY	ESPN+	W 40–39 ^{OT}	4,165
November 17	2:30 p.m.	at Tennessee Tech	Tucker Stadium; Cookeville, TN	ESPN+	W 37–6	4,559
*Non-conference game; ^{†}Homecoming; Rankings from STATS Poll released prior to the game; All times are in Eastern time

== Game summaries ==
=== Morehead State ===
	1	2	3	4	Total
Eagles	0	7	0	16	23
Colonels	18	0	14	17	49

=== At Marshall ===
	1	2	3	4	Total
Colonels	0	6	7	3	16
Thundering Herd	13	7	7	5	32

=== At Bowling Green ===
	1	2	3	4	Total
Colonels	14	7	14	0	35
Falcons	0	28	6	8	42

=== Southeast Missouri State ===
	1	2	3	4	Total
Redhawks	7	0	0	7	14
Colonels	3	7	7	6	23

=== Jacksonville State ===
	1	2	3	4	Total
No. 8 Gamecocks	14	14	7	21	56
Colonels	0	0	0	7	7

=== At UT Martin ===
	1	2	3	4	Total
Colonels	21	0	7	7	35
Skyhawks	7	24	3	0	34

=== Murray State ===
	1	2	3	4	Total
Racers	0	10	14	10	34
Colonels	3	0	3	0	6

=== Eastern Illinois ===
	1	2	3	4	Total
Panthers	10	7	0	6	23
Colonels	3	7	7	14	31

=== At Austin Peay ===
	1	2	3	4	Total
Colonels	3	0	7	7	17
Governors	7	6	0	0	13

=== Robert Morris ===
	1	2	3	4	OT	Total
Colonials	10	13	0	10	6	39
Colonels	6	10	7	10	7	40

=== At Tennessee Tech ===
	1	2	3	4	Total
Colonels	0	13	7	17	37
Golden Eagles	0	3	3	0	6
