= 1991 Southwest Missouri State Bears football team =

American college football season

1991 Southwest Missouri State Bears football
- Conference: Gateway Football Conference
- Record: 6–4–1 (3–3 GFC)
- Head coach: Jesse Branch (6th season)
- Defensive coordinator: Dave Wommack (6th season)
- Captains: Tim McDuffey; Marcus Shipp; Bill Walter
- Home stadium: Briggs Stadium

1991 Gateway Collegiate Athletic Conference football standings
	Conf.					Overall
Team	W		L		T	W		L		T
No. 4 Northern Iowa $^	5	–	1	–	0	11	–	2	–	0
No. 14 Western Illinois ^	4	–	2	–	0	7	–	4	–	1
Southern Illinois	4	–	2	–	0	7	–	4	–	0
Southwest Missouri State	3	–	3	–	0	6	–	4	–	1
Indiana State	2	–	4	–	0	5	–	6	–	0
Eastern Illinois	2	–	4	–	0	4	–	7	–	0
Illinois State	1	–	5	–	0	5	–	6	–	0
$ – Conference champion; ^ – NCAA Division I-AA playoff participant; Rankings from NCAA Division I-AA Football Committee poll

The 1991 Southwest Missouri State Bears football team represented Southwest Missouri State University (now known as Missouri State University) as a member of the Gateway Football Conference (GFC) during the 1991 NCAA Division I-AA football season. Led by sixth-year head coach Del Miller, the Bears compiled an overall record of 6–4–1, with a mark of 3–3 in conference play, and finished fourth in the GFC.

== Schedule ==
Date	Time	Opponent	Rank	Site	Result	Attendance	Source
August 31		at Tulsa*	No. 17	Skelly Stadium; Tulsa, OK	L 13–34	31,124	
September 14		McNeese State*	No. 20	Briggs Stadium; Springfield, MO	W 7–3	15,579	
September 21	7:00 p.m.	Prairie View A&M*	No. 17	Briggs Stadium; Springfield, MO	W 61–0	11,835	
September 28		at North Texas*	No. 12	Fouts Field; Denton, TX	T 21–21	10,415	
October 5		at No. 15 Southern Illinois	No. 19	McAndrew Stadium; Carbondale, IL	W 17–13	13,700	
October 12		at Western Illinois	No. 15	Hanson Field; Macomb, IL	L 21–26	5,343	
October 19		Indiana State		Briggs Stadium; Springfield, MO	W 68–19		
October 26		at Arkansas State*	No. 18	Indian Stadium; Jonesboro, AR	W 37–20	16,088	
November 2	1:30 p.m.	No. 4 Northern Iowa	No. 17	Briggs Stadium; Springfield, MO	L 0–22	6,110	
November 9		Illinois State		Briggs Stadium; Springfield, MO	W 21–6	10,796	
November 16		at Eastern Illinois		O'Brien Field; Charleston, IL	L 29–35	9,131	
*Non-conference game; Rankings from NCAA Division I-AA Football Committee Poll released prior to the game; All times are in Central time
