= 1991 Western Illinois Leathernecks football team =

American college football season

1991 Western Illinois Leathernecks football

NCAA Division I-AA First Round, L 17–20 at Marshall
- Conference: Gateway Collegiate Athletic Conference
- Record: 7–4–1 (4–2 Gateway)
- Head coach: Randy Ball (2nd season)
- Home stadium: Hanson Field

1991 Gateway Collegiate Athletic Conference football standings
	Conf.					Overall
Team	W		L		T	W		L		T
No. 4 Northern Iowa $^	5	–	1	–	0	11	–	2	–	0
No. 14 Western Illinois ^	4	–	2	–	0	7	–	4	–	1
Southern Illinois	4	–	2	–	0	7	–	4	–	0
Southwest Missouri State	3	–	3	–	0	6	–	4	–	1
Indiana State	2	–	4	–	0	5	–	6	–	0
Eastern Illinois	2	–	4	–	0	4	–	7	–	0
Illinois State	1	–	5	–	0	5	–	6	–	0
$ – Conference champion; ^ – NCAA Division I-AA playoff participant; Rankings from NCAA Division I-AA Football Committee poll

The 1991 Western Illinois Leathernecks football team represented Western Illinois University as a member of the Gateway Collegiate Athletic Conference during the 1991 NCAA Division I-AA football season. They were led by second-year head coach Randy Ball and played their home games at Hanson Field. The Leathernecks finished the season with a 7–4–1 record overall and a 4–2 record in conference play. The team received an at-large bid to the NCAA Division I-AA Football Championship playoffs, where they lost to Marshall in the first round.

== Schedule ==
Date	Opponent	Rank	Site	Result	Attendance	Source
September 7	Washburn*		Hanson Field; Macomb, IL	W 42–3	8,238	
September 14	at Wisconsin*		Camp Randall Stadium; Madison, WI	L 13–31	42,861	
September 21	St. Ambrose*		Hanson Field; Macomb, IL	W 27–7	6,034	
September 28	No. 11 Sam Houston State*		Hanson Field; Macomb, IL	T 21–21	8,773	
October 5	at Eastern Illinois		O'Brien Field; Charleston, IL	W 16–15	4,208	
October 12	No. 15 Southwest Missouri State		Hanson Field; Macomb, IL	W 26–21	5,343	
October 19	Southern Illinois	No. 17	Hanson Field; Macomb, IL	W 21–20	10,225	
October 26	at Illinois State	No. 14	Hancock Stadium; Normal, IL	W 22–12	11,283	
November 2	at Indiana State	No. 12	Memorial Stadium; Terre Haute, IN	L 6–7	3,076	
November 9	at Morgan State*	No. 16	Hughes Stadium; Baltimore, MD	W 44–6	350	
November 16	No. 4 Northern Iowa	No. 13	Hanson Field; Macomb, IL	L 17–24	4,500	
November 30	at Marshall*	No. 14	Marshall University Stadium; Huntington, WV (NCAA Division I-AA First Round)	L 17–20	16,840	
*Non-conference game; Rankings from The Sports Network Poll released prior to the game
