= 2018 Murray State Racers football team =

American college football season

2018 Murray State Racers football
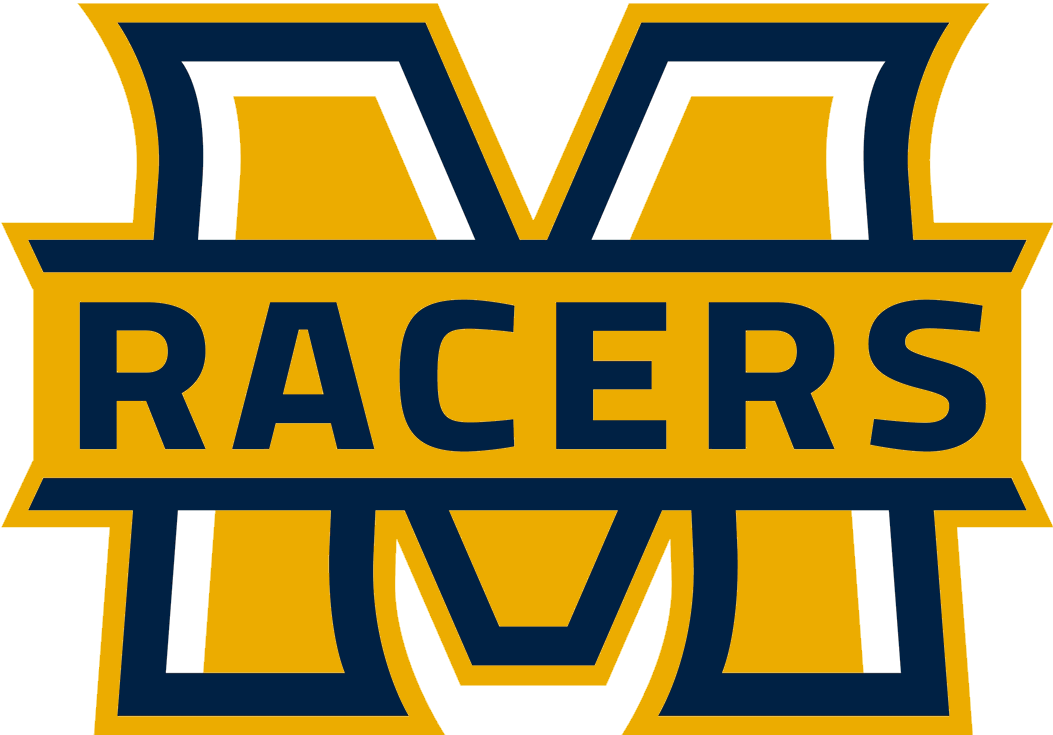
- Conference: Ohio Valley Conference
- Record: 5–6 (5–3 OVC)
- Head coach: Mitch Stewart (4th season)
- Offensive coordinator: Nick Coleman (1st season)
- Defensive coordinator: Jake Johnson (1st season)
- Home stadium: Roy Stewart Stadium

2018 Ohio Valley Conference football standings
	Conf.			Overall
Team	W		L	W		L
No. 10 Jacksonville State $^	7	–	1	8	–	3
No. 15 Southeast Missouri State ^	6	–	2	8	–	3
Eastern Kentucky	5	–	2	7	–	4
Murray State	5	–	3	5	–	6
Tennessee State	3	–	4	4	–	5
Eastern Illinois	3	–	5	3	–	8
Austin Peay	3	–	5	5	–	6
UT Martin	2	–	6	2	–	9
Tennessee Tech	1	–	7	1	–	10
$ – Conference champion; ^ – FCS playoff participant; Rankings from STATS Poll

The 2018 Murray State Racers football team represented Murray State University in the 2018 NCAA Division I FCS football season. They were led by fourth-year head coach Mitch Stewart and played their home games at Roy Stewart Stadium. They were members of the Ohio Valley Conference. They finished the season 5–6, 5–3 in OVC play to finish in fourth place.

== Preseason ==
=== OVC media poll ===
On July 20, 2018, the media covering the OVC released their preseason poll with the Racers predicted to finish in seventh place. On July 23, the OVC released their coaches poll with the Racers predicted to finish in eighth place.

=== Preseason All-OVC team ===
The Colonels had two players selected to the preseason all-OVC team.

Defense

Kenney Wooten – DL

Specialists

Gabriel Vicente – K

== Schedule ==
Date	Time	Opponent	Site	TV	Result	Attendance
August 30	6:00 p.m.	Southern Illinois*	Roy Stewart Stadium; Murray, KY	ESPN+	L 10–49	6,350
September 8	6:00 p.m.	at No. 17 Central Arkansas*	Estes Stadium; Conway, AR	ESPN+	L 13–26	6,121
September 15	11:00 a.m.	at Kentucky*	Kroger Field; Lexington, KY	SECN	L 10–48	48,217
September 29	6:00 p.m.	UT Martin	Roy Stewart Stadium; Murray, KY	ESPN+	W 45–38	11,137
October 6	6:00 p.m.	at Eastern Illinois	O'Brien Stadium; Charleston, IL	ESPN+	W 48–41	3,063
October 13	1:00 p.m.	Tennessee State	Roy Stewart Stadium; Murray, KY	ESPN+	W 45–21	3,318
October 20	2:00 p.m.	at Eastern Kentucky	Roy Kidd Stadium; Richmond, KY	ESPN+	W 34–6	10,440
October 27	3:00 p.m.	No. 12 Jacksonville State^{†}	Roy Stewart Stadium; Murray, KY	ESPN+	L 15–42	8,053
November 3	1:30 p.m.	at Tennessee Tech	Tucker Stadium; Cookeville, TN	ESPN+	L 24–27	8,788
November 10	1:00 p.m.	No. 21 Southeast Missouri State	Roy Stewart Stadium; Murray, KY	ESPN+	W 40–38	2,087
November 17	4:00 p.m.	at Austin Peay	Fortera Stadium; Clarksville, TN	ESPN+	L 23–48	7,113
*Non-conference game; ^{†}Homecoming; Rankings from STATS Poll released prior to the game; All times are in Central time

- Source: Schedule

== Game summaries ==
=== Southern Illinois ===
	1	2	3	4	Total
Salukis	7	21	14	7	49
Racers	3	7	0	0	10

=== At Central Arkansas ===
	1	2	3	4	Total
Racers	3	10	0	0	13
No. 17 Bears	7	13	0	6	26

=== At Kentucky ===
	1	2	3	4	Total
Racers	0	3	0	7	10
Wildcats	7	10	17	14	48

=== UT Martin ===
	1	2	3	4	Total
Skyhawks	3	7	14	14	38
Racers	14	17	7	7	45

=== At Eastern Illinois ===
	1	2	3	4	Total
Racers	10	14	14	10	48
Panthers	7	10	17	7	41

=== Tennessee State ===
	1	2	3	4	Total
Tigers	14	0	0	7	21
Racers	3	21	14	7	45

=== At Eastern Kentucky ===
	1	2	3	4	Total
Racers	0	10	14	10	34
Colonels	3	0	3	0	6

=== Jacksonville State ===
	1	2	3	4	Total
No. 12 Gamecocks	14	7	7	14	42
Racers	6	3	6	0	15

=== At Tennessee Tech ===
	1	2	3	4	Total
Racers	7	0	10	7	24
Golden Eagles	14	3	7	3	27

=== Southeast Missouri State ===
	1	2	3	4	Total
No. 21 Redhawks	17	14	0	7	38
Racers	0	7	17	16	40

=== At Austin Peay ===
	1	2	3	4	Total
Racers	10	7	0	6	23
Governors	14	7	7	20	48

== Players drafted into the NFL ==
Round	Pick	Player	Position	NFL Club
3	98	Quincy Williams	LB	Jacksonville Jaguars
