= 1991 Indiana State Sycamores football team =

American college football season

1991 Indiana State Sycamores football
- Conference: Gateway Collegiate Athletic Conference
- Record: 5–6 (2–4 GCAC)
- Head coach: Dennis Raetz (12th season)
- Home stadium: Memorial Stadium

1991 Gateway Collegiate Athletic Conference football standings
	Conf.					Overall
Team	W		L		T	W		L		T
No. 4 Northern Iowa $^	5	–	1	–	0	11	–	2	–	0
No. 14 Western Illinois ^	4	–	2	–	0	7	–	4	–	1
Southern Illinois	4	–	2	–	0	7	–	4	–	0
Southwest Missouri State	3	–	3	–	0	6	–	4	–	1
Indiana State	2	–	4	–	0	5	–	6	–	0
Eastern Illinois	2	–	4	–	0	4	–	7	–	0
Illinois State	1	–	5	–	0	5	–	6	–	0
$ – Conference champion; ^ – NCAA Division I-AA playoff participant; Rankings from NCAA Division I-AA Football Committee poll

The 1991 Indiana State Sycamores football team represented Indiana State University as a member of the Gateway Collegiate Athletic Conference (GCAC) during the 1991 NCAA Division I-AA football season. The team was led by 12th-year head coach Dennis Raetz and played their home games at Memorial Stadium in Terre Haute, Indiana. The Sycamores finished the season with a 5–6 record overall and a 2–4 record in conference play.

== Schedule ==
Date	Opponent	Site	Result	Attendance	Source
September 7	at Kansas State*	KSU Stadium; Manhattan, KS	L 25–26	26,183	
September 14	Central Missouri State*	Memorial Stadium; Terre Haute, IN	W 35–6		
September 21	Concord*	Memorial Stadium; Terre Haute, IN	W 39–8		
September 28	Ball State*	Memorial Stadium; Terre Haute, IN (rivalry)	L 10–14	8,102	
October 5	at Illinois State	Hancock Stadium; Normal, IL	L 3–6		
October 12	Eastern Illinois	Memorial Stadium; Terre Haute, IN	W 16–15	4,472	
October 19	at Southwest Missouri State	Briggs Stadium; Springfield, MO	L 19–68		
October 26	Southern Illinois^{†}	Memorial Stadium; Terre Haute, IN	L 23–30	3,250	
November 2	No. 12 Western Illinois	Memorial Stadium; Terre Haute, IN	W 7–6	3,076	
November 9	at No. 4 Northern Iowa	UNI-Dome; Cedar Falls, IA	L 21–49	15,429	
November 16	Western Kentucky*	Memorial Stadium; Terre Haute, IN	W 31–14	2,701	
*Non-conference game; ^{†}Homecoming; Rankings from NCAA Division I-AA Football Committee Poll released prior to the game
