= 1991 Eastern Illinois Panthers football team =

American college football season

1991 Eastern Illinois Panthers football
- Conference: Gateway Collegiate Athletic Conference
- Record: 4–7 (2–4 GCAC)
- Head coach: Bob Spoo (5th season)
- Offensive coordinator: Roy Wittke (2nd season)
- Home stadium: O'Brien Stadium

1991 Gateway Collegiate Athletic Conference football standings
	Conf.					Overall
Team	W		L		T	W		L		T
No. 4 Northern Iowa $^	5	–	1	–	0	11	–	2	–	0
No. 14 Western Illinois ^	4	–	2	–	0	7	–	4	–	1
Southern Illinois	4	–	2	–	0	7	–	4	–	0
Southwest Missouri State	3	–	3	–	0	6	–	4	–	1
Indiana State	2	–	4	–	0	5	–	6	–	0
Eastern Illinois	2	–	4	–	0	4	–	7	–	0
Illinois State	1	–	5	–	0	5	–	6	–	0
$ – Conference champion; ^ – NCAA Division I-AA playoff participant; Rankings from NCAA Division I-AA Football Committee poll

The 1991 Eastern Illinois Panthers football team represented Eastern Illinois University as a member of the Gateway Collegiate Athletic Conference (GCAC) during the 1991 NCAA Division I-AA football season. Led by fifth-year head coach Bob Spoo, the Panthers played their home games at O'Brien Stadium in Charleston, Illinois. Eastern Illinois finished the season with on overall record of 4–7 and a conference mark of 2–4, tying for fifth place.

== Schedule ==
Date	Time	Opponent	Site	Result	Attendance	Source
August 31		Lock Haven*	O'Brien Stadium; Charleston, IL	W 62–16	4,018	
September 7	1:00 p.m.	at Iowa State*	Cyclone Stadium; Ames, IA	L 13–42	41,680	
September 14		Eastern Washington*	O'Brien Stadium; Charleston, IL	W 31–12	5,822	
September 21		at Murray State*	Roy Stewart Stadium; Murray, KY	L 27–28	4,174	
October 5		Western Illinois	O'Brien Stadium; Charleston, IL	L 15–16	4,208	
October 12		at Indiana State	Memorial Stadium; Terre Haute, IN	L 15–16	4,472	
October 19		Illinois State	O'Brien Stadium; Charleston, IL (rivalry)	W 37–28	8,421	
November 2		at Southern Illinois	McAndrew Stadium; Carbondale, IL	L 30–31	6,500	
November 9		at Western Kentucky*	L. T. Smith Stadium; Bowling Green, KY	L 26–28	4,124	
November 16		Southwest Missouri State	O'Brien Stadium; Charleston, IL	W 35–29	9,131	
November 23	1:30 p.m.	at No. 4 Northern Iowa	UNI-Dome; Cedar Falls, IA	L 17–18	6,914	
*Non-conference game; Rankings from NCAA Division I-AA Football Committee Poll released prior to the game; All times are in Central time
