= 2018 Southeast Missouri State Redhawks football team =

American college football season

2018 Southeast Missouri State Redhawks football
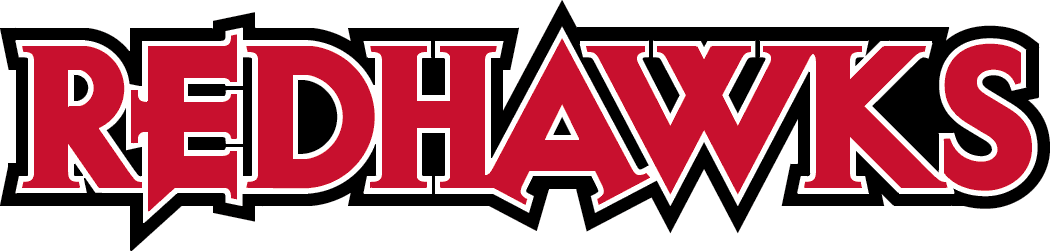

NCAA Division I Second Round, L 23–48 vs. Weber State
- Conference: Ohio Valley Conference

Ranking
- STATS: No. 15
- FCS Coaches: No. 16
- Record: 9–4 (6–2 OVC)
- Head coach: Tom Matukewicz (5th season)
- Offensive coordinator: Jeromy McDowell (1st season)
- Defensive coordinator: Bryce Saia (5th season)
- Home stadium: Houck Stadium

2018 Ohio Valley Conference football standings
	Conf.			Overall
Team	W		L	W		L
No. 10 Jacksonville State $^	7	–	1	8	–	3
No. 15 Southeast Missouri State ^	6	–	2	8	–	3
Eastern Kentucky	5	–	2	7	–	4
Murray State	5	–	3	5	–	6
Tennessee State	3	–	4	4	–	5
Eastern Illinois	3	–	5	3	–	8
Austin Peay	3	–	5	5	–	6
UT Martin	2	–	6	2	–	9
Tennessee Tech	1	–	7	1	–	10
$ – Conference champion; ^ – FCS playoff participant; Rankings from STATS Poll

The 2018 Southeast Missouri State Redhawks football team represented Southeast Missouri State University as a member of the Ohio Valley Conference (OVC) during the 2018 NCAA Division I FCS football season. Led by fifth-year head coach Tom Matukewicz, the Redhawks compiled an overall record of 9–4 with a mark of 6–2 in conference play, placing second in the OVC. Southeast Missouri State received an at-large bid to the NCAA Division I Football Championship playoffs, where they defeated Stony Brook in the first round before losing to Weber State in the second round. The team played home games at Houck Stadium in Cape Girardeau, Missouri.

== Preseason ==
=== OVC media poll ===
On July 20, 2018, the media covering the OVC released their preseason poll with the Redhawks predicted to finish in eighth place. On July 23, the OVC released their coaches poll with the Redhawks predicted to finish in seventh place.

=== Preseason All-OVC team ===
The Redhawks had thee players selected to the preseason all-OVC team. Running back Marquis Terry was also selected as the preseason offensive player of the year.

Offense

Marquis Terry – RB

Drew Forbes – T

Defense

Zach Hall – LB

=== Award watch lists ===
Award	Player	Position	Year
Walter Payton Award	Marquis Terry	RB	SR

== Schedule ==
Date	Time	Opponent	Rank	Site	TV	Result	Attendance
September 1	6:00 p.m.	at Arkansas State*		Centennial Bank Stadium; Jonesboro, AR	ESPN+	L 21–48	20,184
September 8	1:00 p.m.	Dayton*		Houck Stadium; Cape Girardeau, MO	ESPN+	W 40–21	4,273
September 15	6:00 p.m.	at Southern Illinois*		Saluki Stadium; Carbondale, IL	ESPN+	W 48–44	8,592
September 22	3:00 p.m.	at Eastern Kentucky		Roy Kidd Stadium; Richmond, KY	ESPN+	L 14–23	7,720
October 6	6:00 p.m.	at Tennessee Tech		Tucker Stadium; Cookeville, TN	ESPN+	W 70–38	4,404
October 13	1:00 p.m.	Austin Peay^{†}		Houck Stadium; Cape Girardeau, MO	ESPN+	W 31–27	6,467
October 20	1:00 p.m.	No. 5 Jacksonville State		Houck Stadium; Cape Girardeau, MO	ESPN+	W 37–14	3,103
October 27	2:00 p.m.	at UT Martin		Graham Stadium; Martin, TN	ESPN+	W 56–33	4,014
November 3	1:00 p.m.	Tennessee State	No. 25	Houck Stadium; Cape Girardeau, MO	ESPN+	W 38–21	3,481
November 10	1:00 p.m.	at Murray State	No. 21	Roy Stewart Stadium; Murray, KY	ESPN+	L 38–40	2,087
November 17	1:00 p.m.	Eastern Illinois	No. 23	Houck Stadium; Cape Girardeau, MO	ESPN+	W 38–32	3,987
November 24	1:00 p.m	No. 15 Stony Brook*	No. 20	Houck Stadium; Cape Girardeau, MO (NCAA Division I First Round)	ESPN3	W 28–14	5,679
December 1	1:00 p.m.	at No. 3 Weber State*	No. 20	Stewart Stadium; Ogden, UT (NCAA Division I Second Round)	ESPN3	L 23–48	8,838
*Non-conference game; ^{†}Homecoming; Rankings from STATS Poll released prior to the game; All times are in Central time

== Game summaries ==
=== At Arkansas State ===
	1	2	3	4	Total
Redhawks	0	14	0	7	21
Red Wolves	7	14	27	0	48

=== Dayton ===
	1	2	3	4	Total
Flyers	7	0	7	7	21
Redhawks	3	10	7	20	40

=== At Southern Illinois ===
	1	2	3	4	Total
Redhawks	14	3	17	14	48
Salukis	10	10	7	17	44

=== At Eastern Kentucky ===
	1	2	3	4	Total
Redhawks	7	0	0	7	14
Colonels	3	7	7	6	23

=== At Tennessee Tech ===
	1	2	3	4	Total
Redhawks	21	28	14	7	70
Golden Eagles	3	14	7	14	38

=== Austin Peay ===
	1	2	3	4	Total
Governors	6	7	0	14	27
Redhawks	3	0	7	21	31

=== Jacksonville State ===
	1	2	3	4	Total
No. 5 Gamecocks	0	7	0	7	14
Redhawks	7	9	14	7	37

=== At UT Martin ===
	1	2	3	4	Total
Redhawks	16	14	7	19	56
Skyhawks	7	10	3	13	33

=== Tennessee State ===
	1	2	3	4	Total
Tigers	0	14	7	0	21
No. 25 Redhawks	3	21	14	0	38

=== At Murray State ===
	1	2	3	4	Total
No. 21 Redhawks	17	14	0	7	38
Racers	0	7	17	16	40

=== Eastern Illinois ===
	1	2	3	4	Total
Panthers	7	0	10	15	32
No. 23 Redhawks	10	7	3	18	38

=== Stony Brook–NCAA Division I First Round ===
	1	2	3	4	Total
No. 15 Seawolves	0	14	0	0	14
No. 20 Redhawks	0	0	28	0	28

=== At Weber State–NCAA Division I Second Round ===
	1	2	3	4	Total
No. 20 Redhawks	7	0	7	9	23
No. 3 Wildcats	0	27	7	14	48

== Ranking movements ==
Ranking movements Legend: ██ Increase in ranking ██ Decrease in ranking — = Not ranked RV = Received votes
	Week													
Poll	Pre	1	2	3	4	5	6	7	8	9	10	11	12	Final
STATS FCS	—	—	—	—	—	—	—	—	RV	25	21	23	20	15
Coaches	—	—	—	—	—	—	—	—	RV	24	19	23	20	16

== Players drafted into the NFL ==
Round	Pick	Player	Position	NFL team
6	189	Drew Forbes	Offeneive tackle	Cleveland Browns
