= 1991 Illinois State Redbirds football team =

American college football season

1991 Illinois State Redbirds football
- Conference: Gateway Collegiate Athletic Conference
- Record: 5–6 (1–5 GCAC)
- Head coach: Jim Heacock (4th season)
- Home stadium: Hancock Stadium

1991 Gateway Collegiate Athletic Conference football standings
	Conf.					Overall
Team	W		L		T	W		L		T
No. 4 Northern Iowa $^	5	–	1	–	0	11	–	2	–	0
No. 14 Western Illinois ^	4	–	2	–	0	7	–	4	–	1
Southern Illinois	4	–	2	–	0	7	–	4	–	0
Southwest Missouri State	3	–	3	–	0	6	–	4	–	1
Indiana State	2	–	4	–	0	5	–	6	–	0
Eastern Illinois	2	–	4	–	0	4	–	7	–	0
Illinois State	1	–	5	–	0	5	–	6	–	0
$ – Conference champion; ^ – NCAA Division I-AA playoff participant; Rankings from NCAA Division I-AA Football Committee poll

The 1991 Illinois State Redbirds football team represented Illinois State University as a member of the Gateway Collegiate Athletic Conference (GCAC) during the 1991 NCAA Division I-AA football season. In their fourth year under head coach Jim Heacock, the Redbirds compiled an overall record of 5–6, with a mark of 1–5 in conference play, and finished seventh in the GCAC. Illinois State played home games at Hancock Stadium in Normal, Illinois.

== Schedule ==
Date	Opponent	Rank	Site	Result	Attendance	Source
August 31	St. Francis (IL)*		Hancock Stadium; Normal, IL	W 19–17	10,596	
September 14	at Akron*		Rubber Bowl; Akron, OH	W 25–3	20,680	
September 21	Southeast Missouri State*		Hancock Stadium; Normal, IL	W 42–7		
September 28	at Southern Illinois	No. 19	McAndrew Stadium; Carbondale, IL	L 11–14	16,500	
October 5	Indiana State		Hancock Stadium; Normal, IL	W 6–3		
October 12	No. 7 Northern Iowa		Hancock Stadium; Normal, IL	L 14–17	12,651	
October 19	at Eastern Illinois		O'Brien Stadium; Charleston, IL (rivalry)	L 28–37	8,421	
October 26	No. 14 Western Illinois		Hancock Stadium; Normal, IL	L 12–22	11,283	
November 9	at Southwest Missouri State		Briggs Stadium; Springfield, MO	L 6–21	10,796	
November 16	at Northern Illinois*		Huskie Stadium; DeKalb, IL	L 24–27	6,943	
November 23	Western Kentucky*		Hancock Stadium; Normal, IL	W 31–8	7,104	
*Non-conference game; Rankings from NCAA Division I-AA Football Committee Poll released prior to the game
