= 2018 Austin Peay Governors football team =

American college football season

2018 Austin Peay Governors football
- Conference: Ohio Valley Conference
- Record: 5–6 (3–5 OVC)
- Head coach: Will Healy (3rd season)
- Offensive coordinator: Wesley Satterfield (3rd season)
- Defensive coordinator: Brandon Cooper (2nd season)
- Home stadium: Fortera Stadium

2018 Ohio Valley Conference football standings
	Conf.			Overall
Team	W		L	W		L
No. 10 Jacksonville State $^	7	–	1	8	–	3
No. 15 Southeast Missouri State ^	6	–	2	8	–	3
Eastern Kentucky	5	–	2	7	–	4
Murray State	5	–	3	5	–	6
Tennessee State	3	–	4	4	–	5
Eastern Illinois	3	–	5	3	–	8
Austin Peay	3	–	5	5	–	6
UT Martin	2	–	6	2	–	9
Tennessee Tech	1	–	7	1	–	10
$ – Conference champion; ^ – FCS playoff participant; Rankings from STATS Poll

The 2018 Austin Peay Governors football team represented Austin Peay State University during the 2018 NCAA Division I FCS football season. The Governors, led by third-year head coach Will Healy, played their home games at Fortera Stadium as members of the Ohio Valley Conference. They finished the season 5–6, 3–5 in OVC play to finish in a tie for sixth place.

On December 5, head coach Will Healy resigned to become the head coach at Charlotte. He finished at Austin Peay with a three-year record of 13–21.

== Preseason ==
=== OVC media poll ===
On July 20, 2018, the media covering the OVC released their preseason poll with the Governors predicted to finish in second place. On July 23, the OVC released their coaches poll with the Governors also predicted to finish in second place.

=== Preseason All-OVC team ===
The Governors had five players selected to the preseason all-OVC team.

Offense

Jeremiah Oatsvall – QB

Ryan Rockensuess– G

Kyle Anderton – T

Defense

Jaison Williams – DL

Gunnar Scholato– DB

=== Award watch lists ===
Award	Player	Position	Year
Buck Buchanan Award	Jaison Williams	DE	JR

== Schedule ==
Date	Time	Opponent	Rank	Site	TV	Result	Attendance
September 1	2:30 p.m.	at No. 3 (FBS) Georgia*	No. 22	Sanford Stadium; Athens, GA	ESPN	L 0–45	92,746
September 8	6:00 p.m.	Presbyterian*		Fortera Stadium; Clarksville, TN	ESPN+	W 24–0	5,166
September 15	5:00 p.m.	at Morehead State*		Jayne Stadium; Morehead, KY	ESPN+	W 78–40	5,955
September 22	2:00 p.m.	at UT Martin	No. 24	Graham Stadium; Martin, TN (Sgt. York Trophy)	ESPN+	L 7–37	1,497
September 29	3:00 p.m.	at No. 8 Jacksonville State		JSU Stadium; Jacksonville, AL	ESPN3	L 32–48	19,388
October 6	6:00 p.m.	Tennessee State		Fortera Stadium; Clarksville, TN (Sgt. York Trophy)	ESPN3	W 49–34	12,201
October 13	1:00 p.m.	at Southeast Missouri State		Houck Stadium; Cape Girardeau, MO	ESPN+	L 27–31	6,467
October 27	4:00 p.m.	Tennessee Tech^{†}		Fortera Stadium; Clarksville, TN (Sgt. York Trophy)	ESPN+	W 41–10	7,236
November 3	4:00 p.m.	Eastern Kentucky		Fortera Stadium; Clarksville, TN	ESPN+	L 13–17	6,094
November 10	1:00 p.m.	at Eastern Illinois		O'Brien Stadium; Charleston, IL	ESPN+	L 21–52	2,149
November 17	4:00 p.m.	Murray State		Fortera Stadium; Clarksville, TN	ESPN+	W 48–23	7,113
*Non-conference game; ^{†}Homecoming; Rankings from STATS Poll released prior to the game; All times are in Central time

- Source: Schedule

== Game summaries ==
=== At Georgia ===
	1	2	3	4	Total
No. 22 Governors	0	0	0	0	0
No. 3 (FBS) Bulldogs	17	21	7	0	45

=== Presbyterian ===
Presbyterian Blue Hose at Austin Peay Governors

Quarter	1	2	3	4	Total
Blue Hose	0	0	0	0	0
Governors	0	10	7	7	24

at Fortera Stadium • Clarksville, TN

- Date: September 8
- Game time: 6:00 p.m. CT
- Game weather: Temperature: 76 °F (24 °C) • Weather: Overcast • Wind: SW 2 mph
- Game attendance: 5,166
- Referee: Stephen Hazle
- TV: ESPN+

Game information

First Quarter
No scoring
Second Quarter

- (6:27) AP – Oatsvall 13 yard rush, Birchfield kick
- (1:30) AP – Birchfield 24 yard FG

Third Quarter

- (10:52) AP – Momodu 3 yard rush, Birchfield kick

Fourth Quarter

- (11:50) AP – Craig 8 yard rush, Birchfield kick

Top Passers

- PRES – John Walker: 12/23, 94 yards, 1 INT
- AP – JaVaughn Craig: 11/18, 127 yards

Top Rushers

- PRES – Jarius Jeter: 16 carries, 61 yards
- AP – JaVaughn Craig: 8 carries, 108 yards, 1 TD

Top Receiving

- PRES – Keith Pearson: 4 receptions, 38 yards
- AP – DJ Montgomery: 10 receptions, 114 yards

=== At Morehead State ===
	1	2	3	4	Total
Governors	22	21	14	21	78
Eagles	14	12	14	0	40

=== At UT Martin ===
	1	2	3	4	Total
No. 24 Governors	7	0	0	0	7
Skyhawks	6	0	17	14	37

=== At Jacksonville State ===
	1	2	3	4	Total
Governors	9	3	14	6	32
No. 8 Gamecocks	0	14	14	20	48

=== Tennessee State ===
	1	2	3	4	Total
Tigers	7	14	6	7	34
Governors	7	21	14	7	49

=== At Southeast Missouri State ===
	1	2	3	4	Total
Governors	6	7	0	14	27
Redhawks	3	0	7	21	31

=== Tennessee Tech ===
	1	2	3	4	Total
Golden Eagles	0	3	7	0	10
Governors	6	14	21	0	41

=== Eastern Kentucky ===
	1	2	3	4	Total
Colonels	3	0	7	7	17
Governors	7	6	0	0	13

=== At Eastern Illinois ===
	1	2	3	4	Total
Governors	0	7	7	7	21
Panthers	14	21	3	14	52

=== Murray State ===
	1	2	3	4	Total
Racers	10	7	0	6	23
Governors	14	7	7	20	48

== Ranking movements ==
Ranking movements Legend: ██ Increase in ranking ██ Decrease in ranking — = Not ranked RV = Received votes
	Week													
Poll	Pre	1	2	3	4	5	6	7	8	9	10	11	12	Final
STATS FCS	22	RV	RV	24	RV	—	—	—	—	—	—	—	—	
Coaches	23	24	23	21	RV	—	—	—	—	—	—	—	—	
