= Mark Elder (American football) =

American football player and coach (born 1977)

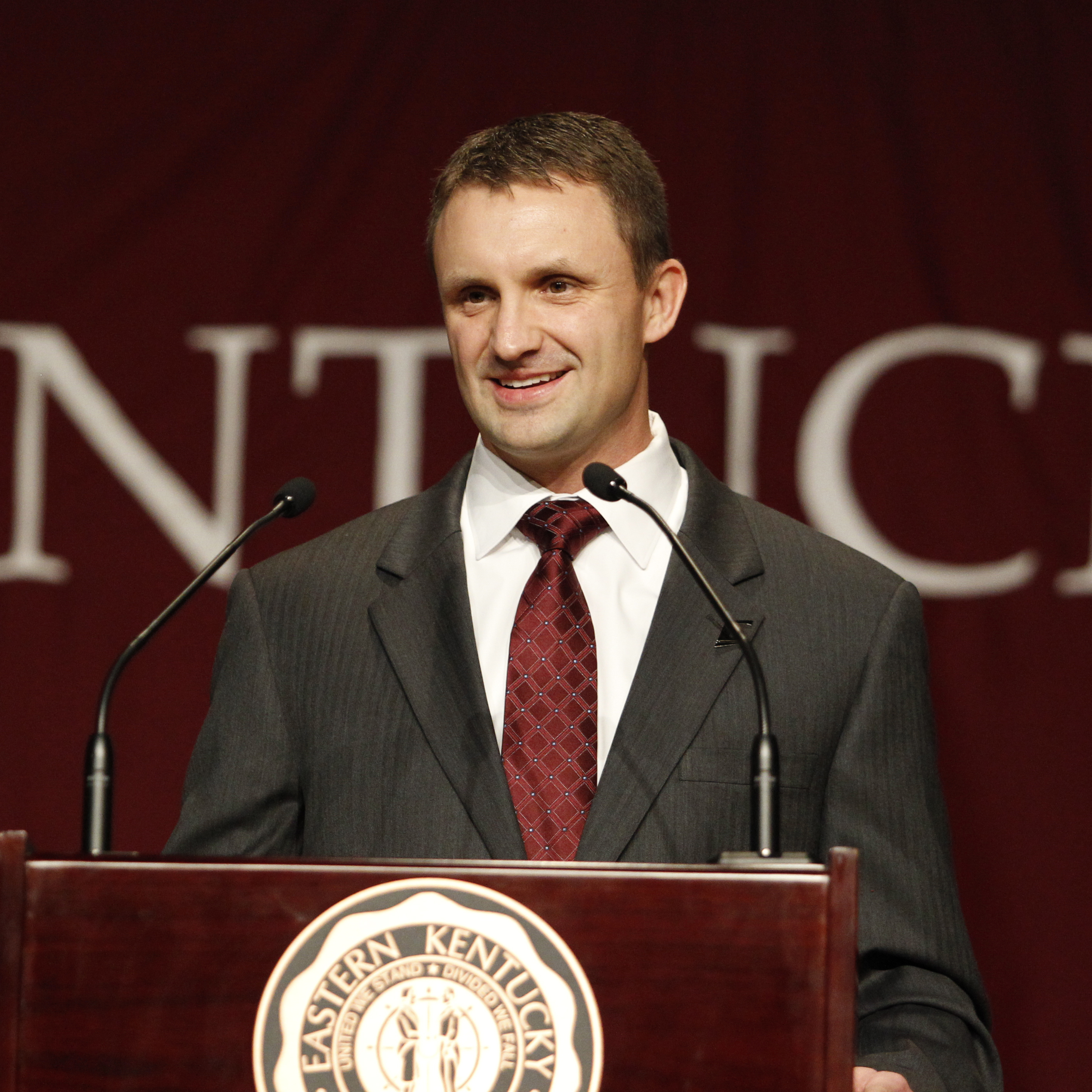
- Elder at Eastern Kentucky press conference

Biographical details
- Born: December 10, 1977 (age 47); Cincinnati, Ohio

Playing career
- 1996–1999: Case Western Reserve
- Position(s): Safety

Coaching career (HC unless noted)
- 2000–2001: Akron (GA)
- 2002: Lehigh (assistant LB)
- 2003: Iona (DC/LB)
- 2004: Wayne State (MI) (DC/LB)
- 2005: Michigan (def. QC)
- 2006: Michigan (GA)
- 2007–2009: Central Michigan (LB/PR)
- 2010: Cincinnati (TE/RC)
- 2011: Cincinnati (RB/PR)
- 2012: Cincinnati (ST/DB)
- 2013–2015: Tennessee (ST/TE)
- 2016–2019: Eastern Kentucky
- 2020–2023: Moeller HS (OH)

Head coaching record
- Overall: 21–24 (college); 27-12 (high school)

Mark Elder (born December 10, 1977) is an American football coach. He was the head football coach at Eastern Kentucky University from 2016 until 2019. Prior to his tenure at Eastern Kentucky, Elder was an assistant coach at the University of Tennessee.

== Biography ==
Elder graduated from Sycamore High School in 1996, and played football at Case Western Reserve. He began his coaching career with stops at Akron, Lehigh, Iona, Wayne State (MI), and Michigan before he was hired as an assistant football coach at Central Michigan by head coach Butch Jones. When Jones was named head coach at Cincinnati in 2010, Elder was named as an assistant. Elder subsequently followed Jones to Tennessee as an assistant coach in 2013.

On December 8, 2015, it was reported that Elder was to be named head football coach at Eastern Kentucky University. He was formally introduced at a press conference on December 10, 2015. When he began his duties as head coach, he also continued to serve as an assistant coach at Tennessee through the completion of the Outback Bowl.

In four years at EKU, Elder recorded four straight top-25 rated recruiting classes. In 2018, he led the program to a 7–4 record, recording their most wins since the 2014 season.

Prior to the 2019 season, the Elder-led Colonels were named to preseason Top 25 lists by Lindy's Sports and Hero Sports. Additionally, Elder was named as a leading preseason candidate for the Eddie Robinson Award, given to the national coach of the year at the FCS level.

Elder's contract at EKU was not renewed after finishing 7-4 and 7-5 in his final two seasons and failing to make the NCAA Division I Football Championship Subdivision playoffs.

On December 19, 2019, Elder returned to his hometown of Cincinnati to become the new head coach at Moeller HS.

On February 3, 2023, Elder announced that he resigned from Moeller HS.

== Personal life ==
Elder and his wife, Lindsey, have two sons, Owen and Ellis, and one daughter, Lila.

== Head coaching record ==
=== College ===
Year	Team	Overall	Conference	Standing	Bowl/playoffs
Eastern Kentucky Colonels (Ohio Valley Conference) (2016–2019)
2016	Eastern Kentucky	3–8	2–6	8th	
2017	Eastern Kentucky	4–7	3–5	5th	
2018	Eastern Kentucky	7–4	5–2	3rd	
2019	Eastern Kentucky	7–5	5–3	4th	
Eastern Kentucky:		21–24	15–16		
Total:		21–24			
