= 1991 Northern Iowa Panthers football team =

American college football season

1991 Northern Iowa Panthers football

Gateway champion

NCAA Division I-AA Quarterfinal, L 13–41 at Marshall
- Conference: Gateway Collegiate Athletic Conference
- Record: 11–2 (5–1 GCAC)
- Head coach: Terry Allen (3rd season)
- Defensive coordinator: Ardell Wiegandt (3rd season)
- Home stadium: UNI-Dome

1991 Gateway Collegiate Athletic Conference football standings
	Conf.					Overall
Team	W		L		T	W		L		T
No. 4 Northern Iowa $^	5	–	1	–	0	11	–	2	–	0
No. 14 Western Illinois ^	4	–	2	–	0	7	–	4	–	1
Southern Illinois	4	–	2	–	0	7	–	4	–	0
Southwest Missouri State	3	–	3	–	0	6	–	4	–	1
Indiana State	2	–	4	–	0	5	–	6	–	0
Eastern Illinois	2	–	4	–	0	4	–	7	–	0
Illinois State	1	–	5	–	0	5	–	6	–	0
$ – Conference champion; ^ – NCAA Division I-AA playoff participant; Rankings from NCAA Division I-AA Football Committee poll

The 1991 Northern Iowa Panthers football team was an American football team that represented the University of Northern Iowa as a member of the Gateway Collegiate Athletic Conference (Gateway Conference) during the 1991 NCAA Division I-AA football season. In its third season under head coach Terry Allen, the team compiled an 11–2 record (5–1 in conference games) and won the Gateway Conference championship. Northern Iowa advanced to the NCAA Division I-AA playoffs, beating Weber State in the first round before losing to Marshall in the second round.

Placekicker Brian Mitchell scored 113 points (47 extra points, 22 field goals) and received first-team honors on the 1991 Walter Camp, Football Gazette, Associated Press, and Kodak Division I-AA All-America teams. Linebacker William Freeney had 141 total tackles (96 unassisted), 20 tackles for loss, and 13 sacks, and was selected as the Gateway Conference defensive player of the year. Six Northern Iowa players were honored as first-team players on the 1991 all-Gateway football team: Mitchell; Freeney; quarterback Jay Johnson; tight end Chris Nuss; wide receiver Kenny Shedd; and offensive tackle Steve Dhaemers. Four others were named to the second team.

The team played its home games at the UNI-Dome in Cedar Falls, Iowa.

== Schedule ==
Date	Time	Opponent	Rank	Site	Result	Attendance	Source
September 7	1:30 p.m.	McNeese State*	No. 7	UNI-Dome; Cedar Falls, IA	W 30–5	9,123	
September 14	7:00 p.m.	Augustana (SD)*	No. 7	UNI-Dome; Cedar Falls, IA	W 45–22	10,349	
September 21	1:30 p.m.	at Southern Illinois	No. 5	McAndrew Stadium; Carbondale, IL	L 20–21	12,200	
September 28	8:00 p.m.	at No. 2 Idaho*	No. T–17	Kibbie Dome; Moscow, ID	W 36–14	11,500	
October 5	1:30 p.m.	Morgan State*^{†}	No. 9	UNI-Dome; Cedar Falls, IA	W 56–6	13,368	
October 12	1:30 p.m.	at Illinois State	No. 7	Hancock Stadium; Normal, IL	W 17–14	12,651	
October 26	7:00 p.m.	at Western Kentucky*	No. 4	L. T. Smith Stadium; Bowling Green, KY	W 49–21	3,228	
November 2	1:30 p.m.	at No. 17 Southwest Missouri State	No. 4	Briggs Stadium; Springfield, MO	W 22–0	6,110	
November 9	7:00 p.m.	Indiana State	No. 4	UNI-Dome; Cedar Falls, IA	W 49–21	15,429	
November 16	1:00 p.m.	at No. 13 Western Illinois	No. 4	Hanson Field; Macomb, IL	W 24–17	4,500	
November 23	1:30 p.m.	Eastern Illinois	No. 4	UNI-Dome; Cedar Falls, IA	W 18–17	6,914	
November 30		No. 15 Weber State*	No. 4	UNI-Dome; Cedar Falls, IA (NCAA Division I-AA First Round)	W 38–21	8,723	
December 7		at No. 8 Marshall*	No. 4	Marshall University Stadium; Huntington, WV (NCAA Division I-AA Quarterfinal)	L 13–41	16,889	
*Non-conference game; ^{†}Homecoming; Rankings from NCAA Division I-AA Football Committee Poll released prior to the game; All times are in Central time
