= 2018 Jacksonville State Gamecocks football team =

American college football season

2018 Jacksonville State Gamecocks football

OVC champion

NCAA Division I Second Round, L 27–55 at Maine
- Conference: Ohio Valley Conference

Ranking
- STATS: No. 10
- FCS Coaches: No. 13
- Record: 9–4 (7–1 OVC)
- Head coach: John Grass (5th season)
- Offensive coordinator: Jimmy Ogle (19th season)
- Defensive coordinator: Andrew Warwick (1st season)
- Home stadium: Burgess–Snow Field at JSU Stadium

2018 Ohio Valley Conference football standings
	Conf.			Overall
Team	W		L	W		L
No. 10 Jacksonville State $^	7	–	1	8	–	3
No. 15 Southeast Missouri State ^	6	–	2	8	–	3
Eastern Kentucky	5	–	2	7	–	4
Murray State	5	–	3	5	–	6
Tennessee State	3	–	4	4	–	5
Eastern Illinois	3	–	5	3	–	8
Austin Peay	3	–	5	5	–	6
UT Martin	2	–	6	2	–	9
Tennessee Tech	1	–	7	1	–	10
$ – Conference champion; ^ – FCS playoff participant; Rankings from STATS Poll

The 2018 Jacksonville State Gamecocks football team represented Jacksonville State University as a member of the Ohio Valley Conference (OVC) during the 2018 NCAA Division I FCS football season. Led by fifth-year head coach John Grass, the Gamecocks compiled an overall record of 9–4, with a mark of 7–1 conference play, winning the OVC title for the fifth consecutive season. Jacksonville State received the OVC's automatic bid to the NCAA Division I Football Championship playoff marking the program's sixth straight trip to the FCS playoffs. The Gamecocks defeated East Tennessee State in the first round before losing to Maine in the second round. The team played home games at Burgess–Snow Field at JSU Stadium in Jacksonville, Alabama.

== Preseason ==
=== OVC media poll ===
On July 20, 2018, the media covering the OVC released their preseason poll with the Gamecocks predicted to win the OVC championship. On July 23, the OVC released their coaches poll with the Gamecocks also predicted to become OVC champions.

=== Preseason All-OVC team ===
The Gamecocks had six players selected to the preseason all-OVC team. Defensive lineman Randy Roberinson was also selected as the preseason defensive player of the year.

Offense

Tyler Scozzaro – C

B.J. Autry– G

Darius Anderson – G

Defense

Randy Robinson – DL

Marlon Bridges – DB

Specialists

Cade Stinnett – K

=== Award watch lists ===
Award	Player	Position	Year
Buck Buchanan Award	Marlon Bridges	S	JR

== Schedule ==
Date	Time	Opponent	Rank	Site	TV	Result	Attendance
August 25	7:00 p.m.	vs. No. 14 North Carolina A&T*	No. 6	Cramton Bowl; Montgomery, AL (FCS Kickoff)	ESPN	L 17–20	13,500
September 8	6:00 p.m.	Mississippi Valley State*	No. 13	Burgess–Snow Field at JSU Stadium; Jacksonville, AL	ESPN+	W 71–0	21,864
September 22	6:00 p.m.	Tennessee Tech	No. 10	Burgess–Snow Field at JSU Stadium; Jacksonville, AL	ESPN+	W 48–20	17,403
September 29	3:00 p.m.	Austin Peay^{†}	No. 8	Burgess–Snow Field at JSU Stadium; Jacksonville, AL	ESPN3	W 48–32	19,388
October 6	3:00 p.m.	at Eastern Kentucky	No. 8	Roy Kidd Stadium; Richmond, KY	ESPN+	W 56–7	6,820
October 13	3:00 p.m.	Eastern Illinois	No. 8	Burgess–Snow Field at JSU Stadium; Jacksonville, AL	ESPN3	W 49–22	15,649
October 20	1:00 p.m.	at Southeast Missouri State	No. 5	Houck Stadium; Cape Girardeau, MO	ESPN+	L 14–37	3,103
October 27	3:00 p.m.	at Murray State	No. 12	Roy Stewart Stadium; Murray, KY	ESPN+	W 42–15	8,053
November 3	1:00 p.m.	UT Martin	No. 10	Burgess–Snow Field at JSU Stadium; Jacksonville, AL	ESPN+	W 21–14	16,093
November 10	2:00 p.m.	at Tennessee State	No. 8	Hale Stadium; Nashville, TN	ESPN+	W 41–14	6,718
November 17	3:00 p.m.	vs. No. 2 Kennesaw State*	No. 6	SunTrust Park; Atlanta, GA	FSS	L 52–60 ^{5OT}	16,949
November 24	6:30 p.m.	No. 22 East Tennessee State*	No. 8	Burgess–Snow Field at JSU Stadium; Jacksonville, AL (NCAA Division I First Round)	ESPN3	W 34–27	11,024
December 1	11:00 a.m.	at No. 12 Maine*	No. 8	Alfond Stadium; Orono, ME (NCAA Division I Second Round)	ESPN3	L 27–55	6,145
*Non-conference game; ^{†}Homecoming; Rankings from STATS Poll released prior to the game; All times are in Central time

== Game summaries ==
=== vs North Carolina A&T ===
	1	2	3	4	Total
No. 14 Aggies	7	0	13	0	20
No. 6 Gamecocks	0	3	14	0	17

Scoring summary

Quarter	Time	Drive			Team	Scoring information	Score	
Quarter	Time	Plays	Yards	TOP	Team	Scoring information	NCAT	JSU
1	6:31	9	65	4:38	NCAT	Zachary Leslie 24-yard touchdown reception from Lamar Raynard, Noel Ruiz kick good	7	0
2	3:55	10	57	4:00	JSU	23-yard field goal by Cade Stinnett	7	3
3	6:13	3	75	0:58	JSU	Daniel Byrd 49-yard touchdown reception from Zerrick Cooper, Cade Stinnett kick good	7	10
3	5:57				NCAT	Malik Wilson 98 yard kickoff return for touchdown, Cade Stinnett kick good	14	10
3	4:49	3	65	1:08	JSU	Josh Pearson 40-yard touchdown reception from Zerrick Cooper, Cade Stinnett kick good	14	17
3	2:36	5	31	2:13	NCAT	Elijah Bell 4-yard touchdown reception from Lamar Raynard, Noel Ruiz kick failed	20	17
"TOP" = time of possession. For other American football terms, see Glossary of American football.							20	14

=== Mississippi Valley State ===
	1	2	3	4	Total
Delta Devils	0	0	0	0	0
No. 13 Gamecocks	15	21	21	14	71

=== Tennessee Tech ===
	1	2	3	4	Total
Golden Eagles	3	3	7	7	20
No. 10 Gamecocks	10	14	7	17	48

=== Austin Peay ===
	1	2	3	4	Total
Governors	9	3	14	6	32
No. 8 Gamecocks	0	14	14	20	48

=== At Eastern Kentucky ===
	1	2	3	4	Total
No. 8 Gamecocks	14	14	7	21	56
Colonels	0	0	0	7	7

=== Eastern Illinois ===
	1	2	3	4	Total
Governors	3	6	0	13	22
No. 8 Gamecocks	14	7	14	14	49

=== At Southeast Missouri State ===
	1	2	3	4	Total
No. 5 Gamecocks	0	7	0	7	14
Redhawks	7	9	14	7	37

=== At Murray State ===
	1	2	3	4	Total
No. 12 Gamecocks	14	7	7	14	42
Racers	6	3	6	0	15

=== UT Martin ===
	1	2	3	4	Total
Skyhawks	3	0	0	11	14
No. 10 Gamecocks	10	3	0	8	21

=== At Tennessee State ===
	1	2	3	4	Total
No. 8 Gamecocks	20	7	0	14	41
Tigers	7	0	0	7	14

=== vs Kennesaw State ===
	1	2	3	4	OT	2OT	3OT	4OT	5OT	Total
No. 6 Gamecocks	7	7	10	0	7	7	8	6	0	52
No. 2 Owls	0	10	7	7	7	7	8	6	8	60

=== East Tennessee State—NCAA Division I First Round ===
	1	2	3	4	Total
No. 22 Buccaneers	10	10	0	7	27
No. 8 Gamecocks	7	3	10	14	34

=== At Maine—NCAA Division I Second Round ===
	1	2	3	4	Total
No. 8 Gamecocks	7	7	10	3	27
No. 12 Black Bears	21	21	7	6	55

== Ranking movements ==
Ranking movements Legend: ██ Increase in ranking ██ Decrease in ranking
	Week													
Poll	Pre	1	2	3	4	5	6	7	8	9	10	11	12	Final
STATS FCS	6	13	12	10	8	8	8	5	12	10	8	6	8	10
Coaches	6	12	11	9	8	8	7	4	12	10	9	7	9	13
