= 2018 UT Martin Skyhawks football team =

American college football season

2018 UT Martin Skyhawks football
- Conference: Ohio Valley Conference
- Record: 2–9 (2–6 OVC)
- Head coach: Jason Simpson (13th season)
- Offensive coordinator: Kevin Bannon (3rd season)
- Defensive coordinator: Jordon Hankins (2nd season)
- Home stadium: Graham Stadium

2018 Ohio Valley Conference football standings
	Conf.			Overall
Team	W		L	W		L
No. 10 Jacksonville State $^	7	–	1	8	–	3
No. 15 Southeast Missouri State ^	6	–	2	8	–	3
Eastern Kentucky	5	–	2	7	–	4
Murray State	5	–	3	5	–	6
Tennessee State	3	–	4	4	–	5
Eastern Illinois	3	–	5	3	–	8
Austin Peay	3	–	5	5	–	6
UT Martin	2	–	6	2	–	9
Tennessee Tech	1	–	7	1	–	10
$ – Conference champion; ^ – FCS playoff participant; Rankings from STATS Poll

The 2018 UT Martin Skyhawks football team represented the University of Tennessee at Martin as a member of the Ohio Valley Conference (OVC) during the 2018 NCAA Division I FCS football season. Led by 13th-year head coach Jason Simpson, the Skyhawks compiled an overall record of 2–9 with a mark of 2–6 in conference play, placing eighth in the OVC. UT Martin played home games at Graham Stadium in Martin, Tennessee.

== Preseason ==
=== OVC media poll ===
On July 20, 2018, the media covering the OVC released their preseason poll with the Skyhawks predicted to finish in third place. On July 23, the OVC released their coches poll with the Skyhawks also predicted to finish in third place.

=== Preseason All-OVC team ===
The Skyahwks had three players selected to the preseason all-OVC team.

Offense

LaDarius Galloway – RB

Defense

James Gilleylen – LB

Specialists

Peyton Logan – KR

== Schedule ==
Date	Time	Opponent	Site	TV	Result	Attendance
September 1	3:00 p.m.	at Missouri*	Faurot Field; Columbia, MO	SECN	L 14–51	44,019
September 8	6:00 p.m.	at Middle Tennessee*	Johnny "Red" Floyd Stadium; Murfreesboro, TN	ESPN+	L 37–61	16,227
September 15	3:00 p.m.	Chattanooga*	Graham Stadium; Martin, TN	ESPN+	L 24–34	4,414
September 22	2:00 p.m.	No. 24 Austin Peay	Graham Stadium; Martin, TN (Sgt. York Trophy)	ESPN+	W 37–7	1,497
September 29	6:00 p.m.	at Murray State	Roy Stewart Stadium; Murray, KY	ESPN+	L 38–45	11,137
October 13	2:00 p.m.	Eastern Kentucky	Graham Stadium; Martin, TN	ESPN+	L 34–35	1,769
October 20	2:00 p.m.	at Eastern Illinois	O'Brien Field; Charleston, IL	ESPN3	L 21–24 ^{OT}	7,413
October 27	2:00 p.m.	Southeast Missouri State^{†}	Graham Stadium; Martin, TN	ESPN+	L 33–56	4,014
November 3	1:00 p.m.	at Jacksonville State	Burgess–Snow Field at JSU Stadium; Jacksonville, AL	ESPN+	L 14–21	16,093
November 10	2:00 p.m.	Tennessee Tech	Graham Stadium; Martin, TN (Sgt. York Trophy)	ESPN+	W 38–13	2,736
November 17	2:00 p.m.	at Tennessee State	Hale Stadium; Nashville, TN (Sgt. York Trophy)	ESPN+	L 28–31 ^{OT}	3,618
*Non-conference game; ^{†}Homecoming; Rankings from STATS Poll released prior to the game; All times are in Central time

== Game summaries ==
=== At Missouri ===
	1	2	3	4	Total
Skyhawks	0	7	7	0	14
Tigers	14	24	10	3	51

=== At Middle Tennessee ===
	1	2	3	4	Total
Skyhawks	7	10	7	13	37
Blue Raiders	14	12	21	14	61

=== Chattanooga ===
	1	2	3	4	Total
Mocs	10	10	7	7	34
Skyhawks	0	7	0	17	24

=== Austin Peay ===
	1	2	3	4	Total
No. 24 Governors	7	0	0	0	7
Skyhawks	6	0	17	14	37

=== At Murray State ===
	1	2	3	4	Total
Skyhawks	3	7	14	14	38
Racers	14	17	7	7	45

=== Eastern Kentucky ===
	1	2	3	4	Total
Colonels	21	0	7	7	35
Skyhawks	7	24	3	0	34

=== At Eastern Illinois ===
	1	2	3	4	OT	Total
Skyhawks	7	7	0	7	0	21
Panthers	0	7	14	0	3	24

=== Southeast Missouri State ===
	1	2	3	4	Total
Redhawks	16	14	7	19	56
Skyhawks	7	10	3	13	33

=== At Jacksonville State ===
	1	2	3	4	Total
Skyhawks	3	0	0	11	14
No. 10 Gamecocks	10	3	0	8	21

=== Tennessee Tech ===
	1	2	3	4	Total
Golden Eagles	0	13	0	0	13
Skyhawks	14	14	3	7	38

=== At Tennessee State ===
	1	2	3	4	OT	Total
Skyhawks	0	3	7	15	3	28
Tigers	0	12	3	10	6	31
