= 2018 Tennessee State Tigers football team =

American college football season

2018 Tennessee State Tigers football
- Conference: Ohio Valley Conference
- Record: 4–5 (3–4 OVC)
- Head coach: Rod Reed (9th season)
- Offensive coordinator: Jeff Parker (4th season)
- Defensive coordinator: Garry Fisher (2nd season)
- Home stadium: Nissan Stadium; Hale Stadium

2018 Ohio Valley Conference football standings
	Conf.			Overall
Team	W		L	W		L
No. 10 Jacksonville State $^	7	–	1	8	–	3
No. 15 Southeast Missouri State ^	6	–	2	8	–	3
Eastern Kentucky	5	–	2	7	–	4
Murray State	5	–	3	5	–	6
Tennessee State	3	–	4	4	–	5
Eastern Illinois	3	–	5	3	–	8
Austin Peay	3	–	5	5	–	6
UT Martin	2	–	6	2	–	9
Tennessee Tech	1	–	7	1	–	10
$ – Conference champion; ^ – FCS playoff participant; Rankings from STATS Poll

The 2018 Tennessee State Tigers football team represented Tennessee State University as a member of the Ohio Valley Conference (OVC) in the 2018 NCAA Division I FCS football season. They were led by ninth-year head coach Rod Reed and played their home games at Nissan Stadium and Hale Stadium. Tennessee State finished the season 4–5 overall and 3–4 in OVC play to place fifth.

== Preseason ==
=== OVC media poll ===
On July 20, 2018, the media covering the OVC released their preseason poll with the Tigers predicted to finish in fourth place. On July 23, the OVC released their coaches poll with the Tigers predicted to finish in sixth place.

=== Preseason All-OVC team ===
The Tigers had three players selected to the preseason all-OVC team.

Offense

Steven Newbold – WR

Defense

Vincent Sellers – DB

Dajour Nesbeth – DB

== Schedule ==
Date	Time	Opponent	Site	TV	Result	Attendance
September 1	6:00 p.m.	Bethune–Cookman*	Nissan Stadium; Nashville, TN	ESPN+	W 34–3	14,069
September 8	6:00 p.m.	vs. Jackson State*	Liberty Bowl Memorial Stadium; Memphis, TN (Southern Heritage Classic)	FSS	Cancelled (Note: The Jackson State game was cancelled due to inclement weather.)	
September 15	5:00 p.m.	at Hampton*	Armstrong Stadium; Hampton, VA		Cancelled (Note: The Hampton game was cancelled in anticipation of Hurricane Florence.)	
September 22	2:00 p.m.	at Eastern Illinois	O'Brien Field; Charleston, IL	ESPN+	W 41–40	7,670
September 29	3:00 p.m.	at Vanderbilt*	Vanderbilt Stadium; Nashville, TN	SECN	L 27–31	27,340
October 6	6:00 p.m.	at Austin Peay	Fortera Stadium; Clarksville, TN (Sgt. York Trophy)	ESPN3	L 34–49	12,201
October 13	1:00 p.m.	at Murray State	Roy Stewart Stadium; Murray, KY	ESPN+	L 21–45	3,318
October 20	4:30 p.m.	Tennessee Tech^{†}	Nissan Stadium; Nashville, TN	ESPN+	W 41–14	17,283
November 3	1:00 p.m.	at No. 25 Southeast Missouri State	Houck Stadium; Cape Girardeau, MO	ESPN+	L 21–38	3,481
November 10	2:00 p.m.	No. 8 Jacksonville State	Hale Stadium; Nashville, TN	ESPN+	L 14–41	6,718
November 17	2:00 p.m.	UT Martin	Hale Stadium; Nashville, TN	ESPN+	W 31–28 ^{OT}	3,618
*Non-conference game; ^{†}Homecoming; Rankings from STATS Poll released prior to the game; All times are in Central time

== Game summaries ==
=== Bethune–Cookman ===
	1	2	3	4	Total
Wildcats	0	3	0	0	3
Tigers	14	7	3	10	34

=== At Eastern Illinois ===
	1	2	3	4	Total
Tigers	0	13	13	15	41
Panthers	17	7	7	9	40

=== At Vanderbilt ===
	1	2	3	4	Total
Tigers	0	13	7	7	27
Commodores	0	10	14	7	31

=== At Austin Peay ===
	1	2	3	4	Total
Tigers	7	14	6	7	34
Governors	7	14	21	7	49

=== At Murray State ===
	1	2	3	4	Total
Tigers	14	0	0	7	21
Racers	3	21	14	7	45

=== Tennessee Tech ===
	1	2	3	4	Total
Golden Eagles	0	0	0	14	14
Tigers	17	10	14	0	41

=== At Southeast Missouri State ===
	1	2	3	4	Total
Tigers	0	14	7	0	21
No. 25 Redhawks	3	21	14	0	38

=== Jacksonville State ===
	1	2	3	4	Total
No. 8 Gamecocks	20	7	0	14	41
Tigers	7	0	0	7	14

=== UT Martin ===
	1	2	3	4	OT	Total
Skyhawks	0	3	7	15	3	28
Tigers	0	12	3	10	6	31
