= 2018 Eastern Illinois Panthers football team =

American college football season

2018 Eastern Illinois Panthers football
- Conference: Ohio Valley Conference
- Record: 3–8 (3–5 OVC)
- Head coach: Kim Dameron (5th season)
- Offensive coordinator: Scott Parr (1st season)
- Defensive coordinator: Cary Fowler (2nd season)
- Home stadium: O'Brien Field

2018 Ohio Valley Conference football standings
	Conf.			Overall
Team	W		L	W		L
No. 10 Jacksonville State $^	7	–	1	8	–	3
No. 15 Southeast Missouri State ^	6	–	2	8	–	3
Eastern Kentucky	5	–	2	7	–	4
Murray State	5	–	3	5	–	6
Tennessee State	3	–	4	4	–	5
Eastern Illinois	3	–	5	3	–	8
Austin Peay	3	–	5	5	–	6
UT Martin	2	–	6	2	–	9
Tennessee Tech	1	–	7	1	–	10
$ – Conference champion; ^ – FCS playoff participant; Rankings from STATS Poll

The 2018 Eastern Illinois Panthers football team represented Eastern Illinois University as a member of the Ohio Valley Conference (OVC) during the 2018 NCAA Division I FCS football season. Led by Kim Dameron in his fifth and final season as head coach, the Panthers compiled an overall record of 3–8 overall with a mark of 3–5 in conference play, tying for sixth place in the OVC. Eastern Illinois played home games at O'Brien Field in Charleston, Illinois.

On November 18, Dameron was fired. He finished his tenure at Eastern Illinois with a five-year record of 27–30.

== Preseason ==
=== OVC media poll ===
On July 20, 2018, the media covering the OVC released their preseason poll with the Panthers predicted to finish in fifth place. On July 23, the OVC released their coaches poll with the Panthers predicted to finish in fourth place.

=== Preseason All-OVC team ===
The Panthers had three players selected to the preseason all-OVC team.

Offense

- Isaiah Johnson – RB
- Alexander Hollins – WR

Defense

- Mark Williams – DB

== Schedule ==
Date	Time	Opponent	Site	TV	Result	Attendance
September 1	3:00 p.m.	at Arkansas*	Donald W. Reynolds Razorback Stadium; Fayetteville, AR	SECN	L 20–55	63,342
September 8	6:30 p.m.	at No. 19 Illinois State*	Hancock Stadium; Normal, IL (Mid-America Classic)	NBCSC+	L 10–48	8,914
September 15	6:00 p.m.	Indiana State*	O'Brien Field; Charleston, IL	ESPN+	L 41–55	6,420
September 22	2:00 p.m.	Tennessee State	O'Brien Field; Charleston, IL	ESPN+	L 40–41	7,670
September 29	6:00 p.m.	at Tennessee Tech	Tucker Stadium; Cookeville, TN	ESPN+	W 52–38	7,184
October 6	6:00 p.m.	Murray State	O'Brien Field; Charleston, IL	ESPN+	L 41–48	3,063
October 13	3:00 p.m.	at No. 8 Jacksonville State	Burgess–Snow Field at JSU Stadium; Jacksonville, AL	ESPN3	L 22–49	15,649
October 20	2:00 p.m.	UT Martin^{†}	O'Brien Field; Charleston, IL	ESPN3	W 24–21 ^{OT}	7,413
October 27	12:00 p.m.	at Eastern Kentucky	Roy Kidd Stadium; Richmond, KY	ESPN+	L 23–31	4,400
November 10	1:00 p.m.	Austin Peay	O'Brien Field; Charleston, IL	ESPN+	W 52–21	2,149
November 17	1:00 p.m.	at No. 23 Southeast Missouri State	Houck Stadium; Cape Girardeau, MO	ESPN+	L 32–38	3,987
*Non-conference game; ^{†}Homecoming; Rankings from STATS Poll released prior to the game; All times are in Central time

== Game summaries ==
=== At Arkansas ===
	1	2	3	4	Total
Panthers	0	6	7	7	20
Razorbacks	10	28	10	7	55

=== At Illinois State ===
	1	2	3	4	Total
Panthers	0	0	10	0	10
No. 19 Redbirds	7	21	10	10	48

=== Indiana State ===
	1	2	3	4	Total
Sycamores	17	14	14	10	55
Panthers	20	0	7	14	41

=== Tennessee State ===
	1	2	3	4	Total
Tigers	0	13	13	15	41
Panthers	17	7	7	9	40

=== At Tennessee Tech ===
	1	2	3	4	Total
Panthers	7	14	10	21	52
Golden Eagles	10	0	7	21	38

=== Murray State ===
	1	2	3	4	Total
Racers	10	14	14	10	48
Panthers	7	10	17	7	41

=== At Jacksonville State ===
	1	2	3	4	Total
Panthers	3	6	0	13	22
No. 8 Gamecocks	14	7	14	14	49

=== UT Martin ===
	1	2	3	4	OT	Total
Skyhawks	7	7	0	7	0	21
Panthers	0	7	14	0	3	24

=== At Eastern Kentucky ===
	1	2	3	4	Total
Panthers	10	7	0	6	23
Colonels	3	7	7	14	31

=== Austin Peay ===
	1	2	3	4	Total
Governors	0	7	7	7	21
Panthers	14	21	3	14	52

=== At Southeast Missouri State ===
	1	2	3	4	Total
Panthers	7	0	10	15	32
No. 23 Redhawks	10	7	3	18	38
