= Fortera Stadium =

College sports stadium in Tennessee, US

Maynard Family Field at Fortera Stadium
- The Fort
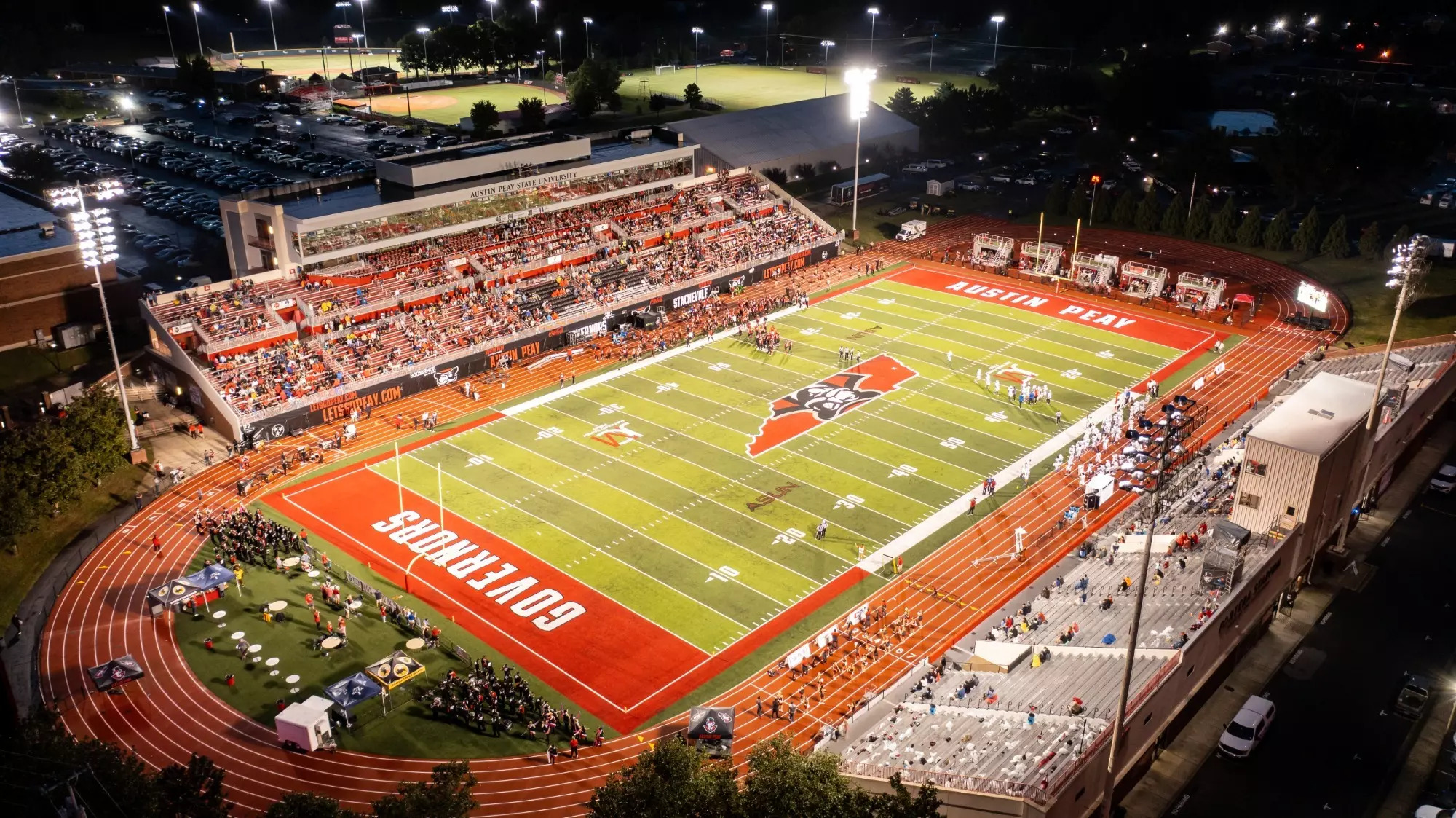
- Interactive map of Maynard Family Field at Fortera Stadium
- Former names: Municipal Stadium (1946–1993); Governors Stadium (1993–2016)
- Address: 681 Summer Street; Clarksville, TN; United States
- Coordinates: 36°32′10″N 87°21′10″W
- Owner: Austin Peay State University
- Operator: Austin Peay State University
- Capacity: 10,000
- Surface: Legion Hybrid Synthetic Turf
- Record attendance: 12,201 (vs. Tennessee State, October 6, 2018)

Construction
- Opened: 1946
- Renovated: 2015, 2022

Tenant
- Austin Peay State University Football (NCAA) (1946–present)

Website
- Fortera Stadium

Fortera Stadium is a stadium located on the campus of Austin Peay State University in Clarksville, Tennessee, United States. It opened in 1946 and is the home venue for the Austin Peay Governors football team.

== History ==
Clarksville Municipal Stadium, as it was originally known, was constructed by the city of Clarksville in 1946. The city permitted Austin Peay to use the stadium for an annual sum which was thought to be the actual cost to the city. The city maintained its ownership and operation of the Municipal Stadium until 1970. In that year, as a result of a cooperative agreement between Austin Peay, the county officials and the city officials, the city conveyed title to one-third of the stadium to the State of Tennessee for the university. The other one-third went to Montgomery County. Following the 1993 season, the University agreed to purchase Municipal Stadium from the Stadium Authority and Montgomery County. With the purchase, the University installed a new playing surface and changed the name of the facility to Governors Stadium.

Austin Peay, Montgomery County, and the city of Clarksville were authorized to appropriate funds to the newly created Stadium Authority for constructing, remodeling and operating the stadium. The members of the Stadium Authority were to be appointed by the county and by the university.

In April 2016, Fortera Credit Union earned naming rights to Governors Stadium. On April 23, Governors Stadium was officially renamed as Fortera Stadium.

=== Renovations ===
Austin Peay agreed to purchase Municipal Stadium from the Stadium Authority. As a result, Stadia Turf replaced the AstroTurf which had been placed by the Stadium Authority. The playing surface was changed again in 2004 when Polytan surfaces were installed on the football field (Mega Grass) and track (Polytan WSS 15).

In August 2012, the Tennessee state government approved plans for a $16 million stadium renovation. After the 2013 season, the west (home) side of the stadium was demolished and replaced with a new structure that includes luxury boxes, a training facility, and new chairback seating. The field and the surrounding track were also replaced; the east (visitor's) side remains largely intact. The renovated stadium reopened for the 2014 season. The renovation also replaced the west side grandstands with a new structure that includes state-of-the-art amenities for student-athletes, coaches and fans.

In April 2014 a small sinkhole opened up at a point between the football field and the track. On May 19, the school started repair work on the sinkhole, which necessitated digging a hole 40 feet (12 m) wide by 40 feet deep to find stable bedrock. School officials were quoted as saying that they expected repairs to solve the problem and that they had budgeted for sinkhole issues due to the karstic terrain on which the campus is situated.

Fortera Stadium re-opened in 2014 following the completion of a massive $16.9 million renovation that replaced the west side grandstands with a new structure that includes state-of-the-art amenities for student-athletes, coaches, and fans as well as skyboxes, club-type seating, and new chairback seating.

The first floor of the new facility includes the Bill Dupes Locker Room, the new home for the Governors football team. Football student-athletes also have access to new athletic training facilities, and their gear is stowed in a new equipment room.

Fans are able to access the main grandstand from the second level. That area also includes new concession stands and is the home of the Austin Peay Bookstore, which provides fans the opportunity to purchase the latest in Austin Peay athletics apparel every game day.

The third and fourth levels provide club seating and 13 skyboxes, respectively. The skyboxes offer tiered stadium-type seating with up to 22 seats. The 8,000-square-foot Echo Power Club Level seats 386 spectators and is designed to offer catered meals on football game days.

To the south of the new stadium facility is the Blake Jenkins Plaza, which provides an expansive concourse for fans to enter the facility. In addition, the Hendricks Fox Walk of History is located in this area and features the name of every football player to have donned the Governors uniform.

In a separate project, the stadium's east grandstands, while not razed, were renovated to move the stadium's in-game operations into the press box. In addition, space under the east grandstand was renovated for the university's track and field program.

Recent additions to the team facilities at Fortera Stadium include a strength and conditioning facility as well as a nutrition room that opened prior to the start of the historic 2017 season. Austin Peay also opened a state-of-the-art sports medicine and athlete care facility on the first floor of Fortera Stadium prior to the 2018 campaign

Using the money donated by the Maynard family, a portion of the funds was used to replace the field turf before the 2022 Season. The Billy Dupes Locker Room was also renovated in 2022. The $750,000 project featured customized and state-of-the-art lockers from Wenger Lockers, brand-new carpet, multi-colored LED lights, a new sound system, and new branding and signage throughout the locker room

Quick Facts
Football Playing Surface	Artificial Turf (FieldTurf XT)
Track Running Surface	
Permanent Seating Capacity	7,000
1st Game at Municipal Stadium	1946
Dedicated as Governors Stadium	Sept. 1, 1993
Dedicated as Fortera Stadium	Apr. 23, 2016

Fortera Stadium Timeline
1946	Municipal Stadium Opens with seating capacity of 5,500
1970	University gains one-third controlling interest in Municipal Stadium and the stadium is renovated, adding AstroTurf artificial surface to the football field and installing an eight-lane Tartan track surface.
1976	Host OVC Track & Field Championships for the first time with Austin Peay winning its only men's track and field title
1993	University purchases Municipal Stadium, renames it Governors Stadium and installs Stadia Turf surface
2004	Stadium and track surfaces replaced with Polytan artificial surfaces (Mega Grass football surface) Governors Stadium hosts 2004 OVC Track & Field Championships
2006	The NFL's Tennessee Titans use Austin Peay facilities for summer training camp
2007	Daktronics scoreboard and video display installed in south end zone.
2013	Tennessee Board of Regents approves $16.9-million stadium renovation project to replace west grandstand, renovate east grandstand and replace both the football and track surfaces.
2014	New Governors Stadium facilities open Stadium hosts 2014 OVC Track & Field Championships
2016	Fortera Credit Union earns Naming rights of Governors Stadium and Renames it Fortera Stadium
2018	Fortera Stadium attendance record broken(12,201) on OCT. 6, APSU vs Tennessee State
2022	Field Turf is replaced using funds from the largest donation to the Athletic Department in School History and field is named Maynard Family Field and Billy Dupes Locker Room is renovated
2023	Fortmetco LED video scoreboard was installed to replace the old scoreboard and videoboard

== See also ==
- List of NCAA Division I FCS football stadiums
