= 1990 NCAA Division I-AA Football Championship Game =

American postseason college football game

1990 NCAA Division I-AA Football Championship
- I-AA National Championship Game
Nevada Wolf Pack	Georgia Southern Eagles
(13–1)	(11–3)
Big Sky	Independent
13	36
Head coach: Chris Ault	Head coach: Tim Stowers
NCAA / Seed; 4 / 4	NCAA / Seed; 3 / 3
	1	2	3	4	Total
Nevada	3	3	0	7	13
Georgia Southern	7	7	6	16	36
- Date: December 15, 1990
- Season: 1990
- Stadium: Paulson Stadium
- Location: Statesboro, Georgia
- Referee: L. V. McGinty
- Attendance: 23,204

United States TV coverage
- Network: CBS Sports
- Announcers: Jim Nantz (play-by-play), Tim Brant (color), John Dockery (sideline)

The 1990 NCAA Division I-AA Football Championship Game was a postseason college football game between the Georgia Southern Eagles and the Nevada Wolf Pack. The game was played on December 15, 1990, at Paulson Stadium in Statesboro, Georgia. The culminating game of the 1990 NCAA Division I-AA football season, it was won by Georgia Southern, 36–13. It was the second consecutive Division I-AA title, and fourth overall, for Georgia Southern.

== Teams ==
The participants of the Championship Game were the finalists of the 1990 I-AA Playoffs, which began with a 16-team bracket. The location of the final, the Georgia Southern Eagles' Paulson Stadium, had been predetermined via a three-year agreement the university reached with the NCAA in February 1989.

=== Georgia Southern Eagles ===
Georgia Southern finished their regular season with an 8–3 record, with one of their losses coming against Florida State of Division I-A. Ranked third in the final NCAA I-AA in-house poll and seeded third in the tournament, the Eagles defeated The Citadel, Idaho, and UCF to reach the final. This was the fifth appearance for Georgia Southern in a Division I-AA championship game, having three prior wins (1985, 1986, and 1989) and one prior loss (1988).

=== Nevada Wolf Pack ===
Nevada finished their regular season with a 10–1 record (7–1 in conference); their only loss was an away game against Boise State. Ranked fourth in the final NCAA I-AA in-house poll and seeded fourth in the tournament, the Wolf Pack defeated Northeast Louisiana, Furman, and Boise State to reach the final. Both the Furman and Boise State games went to triple overtime. This was the first appearance for Nevada in a Division I-AA championship game.

== Game summary ==
=== Scoring summary ===
Scoring summary

Quarter	Time	Drive			Team	Scoring information	Score	
Quarter	Time	Plays	Yards	TOP	Team	Scoring information	NEV	GSU
1	11:34	7	43	3:26	GSU	Joe Ross 14-yard touchdown run, Mike Dowis kick good	0	7
1	5:05	7	24	3:34	NEV	37-yard field goal by Kevin McKelvie	3	7
2	2:38	3	57	0:41	GSU	Raymond Gross 8-yard touchdown run, Dowis kick good	3	14
2	0:03	10	47	2:35	NEV	44-yard field goal by McKelvie	6	14
3	2:23	8	70	2:47	GSU	Darryl Hopkins 3-yard touchdown run, Dowis kick no good (wide right)	6	20
4	14:52	5	35	1:23	GSU	Hopkins 18-yard touchdown run, Dowis kick good	6	27
4	6:22	14	85	4:11	NEV	Russ Ortega 3-yard touchdown reception from Chris Vargas, McKelvie kick good	13	27
4	1:06	11	48	5:16	GSU	41-yard field goal by Dowis	13	30
4	0:44				GSU	Interception returned 15 yards for touchdown by Alex Mash, Dowis kick no good (blocked)	13	36
"TOP" = time of possession. For other American football terms, see Glossary of American football.							13	36

=== Game statistics ===
	1	2	3	4	Total
Wolf Pack	3	3	0	7	13
Eagles	7	7	6	16	36

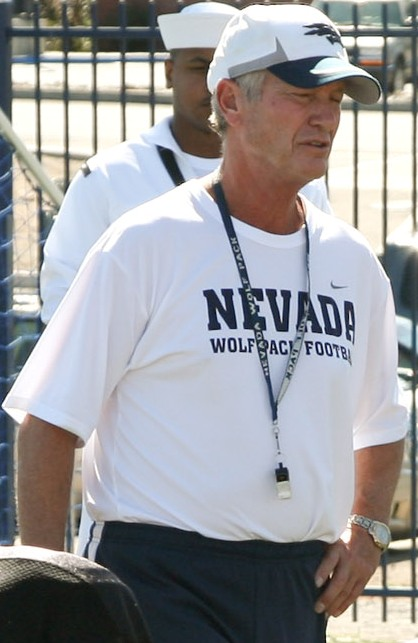
Nevada head coach Chris Ault in 2009

Statistics	NEV	GSU
First downs	21	20
Plays–yards	86–321	63–392
Rushes–yards	33–56	58–323
Passing yards	265	69
Passing: comp–att–int	27–53–2	2–5–0
Time of possession	34:30	25:30

Team	Category	Player	Statistics
Nevada	Passing	Fred Gatlin	17–32, 156 yds
Nevada	Rushing	Ray Whalen	24 car, 71 yds
Nevada	Receiving	Russ Ortega	10 rec, 82 yds, 1 TD
Georgia Southern	Passing	Raymond Gross	2–5, 69 yds
Georgia Southern	Rushing	Raymond Gross	31 car, 145 yds, 1 TD
Georgia Southern	Receiving	Terrance Sorrell	1 rec, 49 yds
