= 1990 Alabama State Hornets football team =

American college football season

1990 Alabama State Hornets football
- Conference: Southwestern Athletic Conference
- Record: 8–2–1 (4–2 SWAC)
- Head coach: Houston Markham (4th season)
- Offensive coordinator: John McKenzie (1st season)
- Home stadium: Cramton Bowl

1990 Southwestern Athletic Conference football standings
	Conf.					Overall
Team	W		L		T	W		L		T
No. 16 Jackson State $^	5	–	1	–	0	8	–	4	–	0
Alabama State	4	–	2	–	0	8	–	2	–	1
Grambling State	3	–	3	–	0	8	–	3	–	0
Mississippi Valley State	3	–	3	–	0	5	–	6	–	0
Southern	2	–	4	–	0	4	–	7	–	0
Texas Southern	2	–	4	–	0	4	–	7	–	0
Alcorn State	2	–	4	–	0	2	–	7	–	0
$ – Conference champion; ^ – NCAA Division I-AA playoff participant; Rankings from NCAA Division I-AA Football Committee poll

The 1990 Alabama State Hornets football team represented Alabama State University as a member of the Southwestern Athletic Conference (SWAC) during the 1990 NCAA Division I-AA football season. Led by fourth-year head coach Houston Markham, the Hornets compiled an overall record of 8–2–1, with a mark of 4–2 in conference play, and finished second in the SWAC.

== Schedule ==
Date	Opponent	Site	Result	Attendance	Source
September 1	vs. Samford*	Legion Field; Birmingham, AL	T 24–24	10,500	
September 8	at Southern	A. W. Mumford Stadium; Baton Rouge, LA	L 6–7	14,579	
September 15	at Alcorn State	Henderson Stadium; Lorman, MS	W 41–3		
September 22	Texas Southern	Cramton Bowl; Montgomery, AL	L 23–24		
September 29	vs. Florida A&M*	Ladd Stadium; Mobile, AL (Gulf Coast Classic)	W 44–32	20,000	
October 6	No. T–14 Jackson State	Cramton Bowl; Montgomery, AL	W 42–28		
October 13	Miles*	Cramton Bowl; Montgomery, AL	W 51–12		
October 27	vs. Alabama A&M*	Legion Field; Birmingham, AL (Magic City Classic)	W 24–20	58,000	
November 3	at Grambling State	Eddie G. Robinson Memorial Stadium; Grambling, LA	W 37–14		
November 10	Mississippi Valley State	Cramton Bowl; Montgomery, AL	W 43–6		
November 22	Tuskegee*	Cramton Bowl; Montgomery, AL (Turkey Day Classic)	W 49–7	25,000	
*Non-conference game; Rankings from NCAA Division I-AA Football Committee Poll released prior to the game
