= 1990 Northern Arizona Lumberjacks football team =

American college football season

1990 Northern Arizona Lumberjacks football
- Conference: Big Sky Conference
- Record: 5–6 (3–5 Big Sky)
- Head coach: Steve Axman (1st season)
- Home stadium: Walkup Skydome

1990 Big Sky Conference football standings
	Conf.					Overall
Team	W		L		T	W		L		T
No. 4 Nevada $^	7	–	1	–	0	13	–	2	–	0
No. 10 Boise State ^	6	–	2	–	0	10	–	4	–	0
No. 13 Idaho ^	6	–	2	–	0	9	–	4	–	0
Montana	4	–	4	–	0	7	–	4	–	0
Northern Arizona	3	–	5	–	0	5	–	6	–	0
Weber State	3	–	5	–	0	5	–	6	–	0
Eastern Washington	3	–	5	–	0	5	–	6	–	0
Montana State	3	–	5	–	0	4	–	7	–	0
Idaho State	1	–	7	–	0	3	–	8	–	0
$ – Conference champion; ^ – NCAA Division I-AA playoff participant; Rankings from NCAA Division I-AA Poll

The 1990 Northern Arizona Lumberjacks football team was an American football team that represented Northern Arizona University (NAU) as a member of the Big Sky Conference (Big Sky) during the 1990 NCAA Division I-AA football season. In their first year under head coach Steve Axman, the Lumberjacks compiled a 5–6 record (3–5 against conference opponents), were outscored by a total of 416 to 290, and placed in a four-way tie for fifth out of nine teams in the Big Sky. The team played its home games at the J. Lawrence Walkup Skydome, commonly known as the Walkup Skydome, in Flagstaff, Arizona.

== Schedule ==
Date	Time	Opponent	Site	Result	Attendance	Source
September 1		Cal State Northridge*	Walkup Skydome; Flagstaff, AZ	W 37–3	6,439–6,449	
September 8		at No. 19 Nevada	Mackay Stadium; Reno, NV	L 14–55	14,210	
September 22		Eastern Washington	Walkup Skydome; Flagstaff, AZ	W 31–24	6,528	
September 29		Idaho State	Walkup Skydome; Flagstaff, AZ	W 35–32	5,626	
October 6		at Montana State	Sales Stadium; Bozeman, MT	L 37–70	10,247	
October 13		No. 10 Boise State	Walkup Skydome; Flagstaff, AZ	L 20–28	8,614	
October 20		at No. 17 Montana	Washington–Grizzly Stadium; Missoula, MT	L 14–48	10,064	
October 27		Nicholls State*	Walkup Skydome; Flagstaff, AZ	W 41–34	9,160	
November 3	12:00 p.m.	at Idaho	Kibbie Dome; Moscow, ID	L 7–52	10,100	
November 10		Weber State	Walkup Skydome; Flagstaff, AZ	W 38–35	4,549	
November 17	6:00 p.m.	at No. 12 Northern Iowa*	UNI-Dome; Cedar Falls, IA	L 16–36	8,517	
*Non-conference game; Rankings from NCAA Division I-AA Football Committee Poll released prior to the game; All times are in Mountain time
