= 1990 Montana State Bobcats football team =

American college football season

1990 Montana State Bobcats football
- Conference: Big Sky Conference
- Record: 4–7 (3–5 Big Sky)
- Head coach: Earle Solomonson (4th season)
- Home stadium: Sales Stadium

1990 Big Sky Conference football standings
	Conf.					Overall
Team	W		L		T	W		L		T
No. 4 Nevada $^	7	–	1	–	0	13	–	2	–	0
No. 10 Boise State ^	6	–	2	–	0	10	–	4	–	0
No. 13 Idaho ^	6	–	2	–	0	9	–	4	–	0
Montana	4	–	4	–	0	7	–	4	–	0
Northern Arizona	3	–	5	–	0	5	–	6	–	0
Weber State	3	–	5	–	0	5	–	6	–	0
Eastern Washington	3	–	5	–	0	5	–	6	–	0
Montana State	3	–	5	–	0	4	–	7	–	0
Idaho State	1	–	7	–	0	3	–	8	–	0
$ – Conference champion; ^ – NCAA Division I-AA playoff participant; Rankings from NCAA Division I-AA Poll

The 1990 Montana State Bobcats football team was an American football team that represented Montana State University in the Big Sky Conference (Big Sky) during the 1990 NCAA Division I-AA football season. In their fourth season under head coach Earle Solomonson, the Bobcats compiled a 4–7 record (3–5 against Big Sky opponents) and finished fifth out of nine teams in the Big Sky.

== Schedule ==
Date	Opponent	Site	Result	Attendance	Source
September 1	at Idaho	Kibbie Dome; Moscow, ID	W 27–24	9,800	
September 8	at Colorado State*	Hughes Stadium; Fort Collins, CO	L 5–41	25,691	
September 15	Western Illinois*	Sales Stadium; Bozeman, MT	W 38–16	8,107	
September 22	No. 13 Nevada	Sales Stadium; Bozeman, MT	L 14–20	12,087	
September 29	at Weber State	Wildcat Stadium; Ogden, UT	L 20–32	7,193	
October 6	Northern Arizona^{†}	Sales Stadium; Bozeman, MT	W 70–37	10,247	
October 20	Idaho State	Sales Stadium; Bozeman, MT	L 19–23	7,347	
October 27	at No. 14 Montana	Washington–Grizzly Stadium; Missoula, MT (rivalry)	L 18–35	15,345	
November 3	No. 8 Boise State	Sales Stadium; Bozeman, MT	L 27–31	7,477	
November 10	at Eastern Washington	Woodward Field; Cheney, WA	W 28–25 ^{2OT}	3,324	
November 17	at Tulsa*	Skelly Stadium; Tulsa, OK	L 2–20	40,248	
*Non-conference game; ^{†}Homecoming; Rankings from NCAA Division I-AA Football Committee Poll released prior to the game
