= 1990 Southern Illinois Salukis football team =

American college football season

1990 Southern Illinois Salukis football
- Conference: Gateway Collegiate Athletic Conference
- Record: 2–9 (1–5 GCAC)
- Head coach: Bob Smith (2nd season)
- Home stadium: McAndrew Stadium

1990 Gateway Collegiate Athletic Conference football standings
	Conf.					Overall
Team	W		L		T	W		L		T
No. 6 Southwest Missouri State +^	5	–	1	–	0	9	–	3	–	0
No. 11 Northern Iowa +^	5	–	1	–	0	8	–	4	–	0
Eastern Illinois	3	–	3	–	0	5	–	6	–	0
Illinois State	3	–	3	–	0	5	–	6	–	0
Western Illinois	3	–	3	–	0	3	–	8	–	0
Indiana State	1	–	5	–	0	4	–	7	–	0
Southern Illinois	1	–	5	–	0	2	–	9	–	0
+ – Conference co-champions; ^ – NCAA Division I-AA playoff participant; Rankings from NCAA Division I-AA Football Committee poll

The 1990 Southern Illinois Salukis football team was an American football team that represented Southern Illinois University (now known as Southern Illinois University Carbondale) in the Gateway Collegiate Athletic Conference (GCAC) during the 1990 NCAA Division I-AA football season. Under second-year head coach Bob Smith, the team compiled a 2–9 record (1–5 against conference opponents) and tied for sixth place in the conference. The team played its home games at McAndrew Stadium in Carbondale, Illinois.

== Schedule ==
Date	Time	Opponent	Site	Result	Attendance	Source
September 1	1:30 p.m.	at Northern Iowa	UNI-Dome; Cedar Falls, IA	L 9–30	10,103	
September 8		Indiana State	McAndrew Stadium; Carbondale, IL	W 20–17	2,400	
September 15		Murray State*	McAndrew Stadium; Carbondale, IL	W 45–7	10,000	
September 22	2:30 p.m.	at No. 15 (I-A) Illinois*	Memorial Stadium; Champaign, IL	L 21–56	64,469	
September 29		Arkansas State*	McAndrew Stadium; Carbondale, IL	L 17–20	11,500	
October 6		at No. 3 Southwest Missouri State	Briggs Stadium; Springfield, MO	L 7–31	8,810	
October 13		at Illinois State	Hancock Stadium; Normal, IL	L 3–27	10,812	
October 20		at Eastern Illinois	O'Brien Field; Charleston, IL	L 3–14	3,728	
October 27		at UCF*	Florida Citrus Bowl; Orlando, FL	L 14–49	14,052	
November 3		Western Illinois^{†}	McAndrew Stadium; Carbondale, IL	L 22–24	12,100	
November 10	12:30 p.m.	at South Carolina*	Williams–Brice Stadium; Columbia, SC	L 13–38	52,812	
*Non-conference game; ^{†}Homecoming; Rankings from NCAA Division I-AA Football Committee Poll released prior to the game; All times are in Central time
