= 1990 Morgan State Bears football team =

American college football season

1990 Morgan State Bears football
- Conference: Mid-Eastern Athletic Conference
- Record: 1–10 (0–6 MEAC)
- Head coach: Ed Wyche (3rd season)
- Home stadium: Hughes Stadium

1990 Mid-Eastern Athletic Conference football standings
	Conf.					Overall
Team	W		L		T	W		L		T
Florida A&M $	6	–	0	–	0	7	–	4	–	0
No. T–19 North Carolina A&T	5	–	1	–	0	9	–	2	–	0
Delaware State	4	–	2	–	0	7	–	3	–	0
Howard	3	–	3	–	0	6	–	5	–	0
South Carolina State	2	–	4	–	0	4	–	6	–	0
Bethune–Cookman	1	–	5	–	0	4	–	7	–	0
Morgan State	0	–	6	–	0	1	–	10	–	0
$ – Conference champion; Rankings from NCAA Division I-AA Football Committee poll

The 1990 Morgan State Bears football team represented Morgan State University as a member of the Mid-Eastern Athletic Conference (MEAC) during the 1990 NCAA Division I-AA football season. Led by third-year head coach Ed Wyche, the Bears compiled an overall record of 1–10, with a mark of 0–6 in conference play, and finished seventh in the MEAC.

== Schedule ==
Date	Opponent	Site	Result	Attendance	Source
September 1	at Central State (OH)*	McPherson Stadium; Wilberforce, OH	L 13–63	2,800	
September 8	Bethune–Cookman	Hughes Stadium; Baltimore, MD	L 7–21		
September 15	Bowie State*	Hughes Stadium; Baltimore, MD	L 9–34		
September 22	at North Carolina A&T	Aggie Stadium; Greensboro, NC	L 0–49	12,329	
September 29	at Morehead State*	Jayne Stadium; Morehead, KY	L 0–47		
October 6	at South Carolina State	Oliver C. Dawson Stadium; Orangeburg, SC	L 9–42	8,266	
October 13	at Virginia Union*	Hovey Field; Richmond, VA	L 15–48		
October 20	Delaware State	Hughes Stadium; Baltimore, MD	L 7–28	17,750	
October 27	vs. Florida A&M	Miami Orange Bowl; Miami, FL (Orange Blossom Classic)	L 15–31	12,191	
November 3	at Howard	William H. Greene Stadium; Washington, DC (rivalry)	L 13–49	4,713	
November 10	at Cheyney*	O'Shields-Stevenson Stadium; Cheyney, PA	W 2–0	897	
*Non-conference game
