= 1990 Indiana State Sycamores football team =

American college football season

1990 Indiana State Sycamores football
- Conference: Gateway Collegiate Athletic Conference
- Record: 4–7 (1–5 GCAC)
- Head coach: Dennis Raetz (11th season)
- Home stadium: Memorial Stadium

1990 Gateway Collegiate Athletic Conference football standings
	Conf.					Overall
Team	W		L		T	W		L		T
No. 6 Southwest Missouri State +^	5	–	1	–	0	9	–	3	–	0
No. 11 Northern Iowa +^	5	–	1	–	0	8	–	4	–	0
Eastern Illinois	3	–	3	–	0	5	–	6	–	0
Illinois State	3	–	3	–	0	5	–	6	–	0
Western Illinois	3	–	3	–	0	3	–	8	–	0
Indiana State	1	–	5	–	0	4	–	7	–	0
Southern Illinois	1	–	5	–	0	2	–	9	–	0
+ – Conference co-champions; ^ – NCAA Division I-AA playoff participant; Rankings from NCAA Division I-AA Football Committee poll

The 1990 Indiana State Sycamores football team represented Indiana State University as a member of the Gateway Collegiate Athletic Conference (GCAC) during the 1990 NCAA Division I-AA football season. The team was led by 11th-year head coach Dennis Raetz and played their home games at Memorial Stadium in Terre Haute, Indiana. The Sycamores finished the season with a 4–7 record overall and a 1–5 record in conference play.

== Schedule ==
Date	Opponent	Site	Result	Attendance	Source
September 2	Central Missouri State*	Memorial Stadium; Terre Haute, IN	W 37–16		
September 8	at Southern Illinois	McAndrew Stadium; Carbondale, IL	L 17–20	2,400	
September 15	Southwest Missouri State	Memorial Stadium; Terre Haute, IN	L 26–33	7,578	
September 22	at Purdue*	Ross–Ade Stadium; West Lafayette, IN	L 13–41	42,387	
September 29	at Western Illinois	Hanson Field; Macomb, IL	L 10–28	7,453	
October 6	Murray State*	Memorial Stadium; Terre Haute, IN	W 52–0	5,089	
October 13	at Eastern Illinois	O'Brien Stadium; Charleston, IL	L 22–31	7,219	
October 20	No. 10 Northern Iowa^{†}	Memorial Stadium; Terre Haute, IN	W 33–23	7,851	
October 27	at Ball State*	Ball State Stadium; Muncie, IN (rivalry)	L 0–42	11,419	
November 3	Illinois State	Memorial Stadium; Terre Haute, IN	L 24–28	3,622	
November 10	at Western Kentucky*	L. T. Smith Stadium; Bowling Green, KY	W 29–27	3,800	
*Non-conference game; ^{†}Homecoming; Rankings from NCAA Division I-AA Football Committee Poll released prior to the game
