= 1990 Western Illinois Leathernecks football team =

American college football season

1990 Western Illinois Leathernecks football
- Conference: Gateway Collegiate Athletic Conference
- Record: 3–8 (3–3 GCAC)
- Head coach: Randy Ball (1st season)
- Home stadium: Hanson Field

1990 Gateway Collegiate Athletic Conference football standings
	Conf.					Overall
Team	W		L		T	W		L		T
No. 6 Southwest Missouri State +^	5	–	1	–	0	9	–	3	–	0
No. 11 Northern Iowa +^	5	–	1	–	0	8	–	4	–	0
Eastern Illinois	3	–	3	–	0	5	–	6	–	0
Illinois State	3	–	3	–	0	5	–	6	–	0
Western Illinois	3	–	3	–	0	3	–	8	–	0
Indiana State	1	–	5	–	0	4	–	7	–	0
Southern Illinois	1	–	5	–	0	2	–	9	–	0
+ – Conference co-champions; ^ – NCAA Division I-AA playoff participant; Rankings from NCAA Division I-AA Football Committee poll

The 1990 Western Illinois Leathernecks football team represented Western Illinois University as a member of the Gateway Collegiate Athletic Conference (GCAC) during the 1990 NCAA Division I-AA football season. The team was led by first-year head coach Randy Ball and played their home games at Hanson Field in Macomb, Illinois. The Leathernecks finished the season with a 3–8 record overall and a 3–3 record in conference play.

== Schedule ==
Date	Opponent	Site	Result	Attendance	Source
September 1	Arkansas–Monticello*	Hanson Field; Macomb, IL	L 11–18		
September 8	at Kansas State*	KSU Stadium; Manhattan, KS	L 6–27	25,432	
September 15	at Montana State*	Sales Stadium; Bozeman, MT	L 16–38	8,107	
September 29	Indiana State	Hanson Field; Macomb, IL	W 28–10	7,453	
October 6	Eastern Illinois	Hanson Field; Macomb, IL	L 17–27	9,181	
October 13	at No. 13 Northern Iowa	UNI-Dome; Cedar Falls, IA	L 14–50	10,794	
October 20	Portland State*	Hanson Field; Macomb, IL	L 27–30		
October 27	at No. 2 Southwest Missouri State	Briggs Stadium; Springfield, MO	L 14–35	10,721	
November 3	at Southern Illinois	McAndrew Stadium; Carbondale, IL	W 24–22	12,100	
November 10	Illinois State	Hanson Field; Macomb, IL	W 21–7	8,176	
November 17	at No. 7 Nevada*	Mackay Stadium; Reno, NV	L 16–50	16,310	
*Non-conference game; Rankings from NCAA Division I-AA Football Committee Poll released prior to the game
