= 1990 Illinois State Redbirds football team =

American college football season

1990 Illinois State Redbirds football
- Conference: Gateway Collegiate Athletic Conference
- Record: 5–6 (3–3 GCAC)
- Head coach: Jim Heacock (3rd season)
- Home stadium: Hancock Stadium

1990 Gateway Collegiate Athletic Conference football standings
	Conf.					Overall
Team	W		L		T	W		L		T
No. 6 Southwest Missouri State +^	5	–	1	–	0	9	–	3	–	0
No. 11 Northern Iowa +^	5	–	1	–	0	8	–	4	–	0
Eastern Illinois	3	–	3	–	0	5	–	6	–	0
Illinois State	3	–	3	–	0	5	–	6	–	0
Western Illinois	3	–	3	–	0	3	–	8	–	0
Indiana State	1	–	5	–	0	4	–	7	–	0
Southern Illinois	1	–	5	–	0	2	–	9	–	0
+ – Conference co-champions; ^ – NCAA Division I-AA playoff participant; Rankings from NCAA Division I-AA Football Committee poll

The 1990 Illinois State Redbirds football team represented Illinois State University as a member of the Gateway Collegiate Athletic Conference (GCAC) during the 1990 NCAA Division I-AA football season. In their third year under head coach Jim Heacock, the Redbirds compiled an overall record of 5–6, with a mark of 3–3 in conference play, and finished tied for third in the GCAC. Illinois State played home games at Hancock Stadium in Normal, Illinois.

== Schedule ==
Date	Opponent	Site	Result	Attendance	Source
September 1	at Akron*	Rubber Bowl; Akron, OH	L 7–17	20,001	
September 8	Ball State*	Hancock Stadium; Normal, IL	L 3–13	11,497	
September 15	at Western Kentucky*	L. T. Smith Stadium; Bowling Green, KY	L 9–19	14,500	
September 22	Missouri–Rolla*	Hancock Stadium; Normal, IL	W 46–0	13,033	
September 29	Eastern Illinois	Hancock Stadium; Normal, IL (rivalry)	W 28–7	12,164	
October 6	at No. 17 Northern Iowa	UNI-Dome; Cedar Falls, IA	L 0–31	14,689	
October 13	Southern Illinois	Hancock Stadium; Normal, IL	W 27–3	10,812	
October 20	No. 2 Southwest Missouri State	Hancock Stadium; Normal, IL	L 30–45	11,936	
October 27	Austin Peay*	Hancock Stadium; Normal, IL	W 13–9		
November 3	Indiana State	Memorial Stadium; Terre Haute, IN	W 28–24	3,622	
November 10	at Western Illinois	Hanson Field; Macomb, IL	L 7–21	8,176	
*Non-conference game; Rankings from NCAA Division I-AA Football Committee Poll released prior to the game
