= 1990 Sam Houston State Bearkats football team =

American college football season

1990 Sam Houston State Bearkats football
- Conference: Southland Conference
- Record: 4–7 (3–3 Southland)
- Head coach: Ron Randleman (9th season)
- Defensive coordinator: Mike Lucas (1st season)
- Home stadium: Bowers Stadium

1990 Southland Conference football standings
	Conf.					Overall
Team	W		L		T	W		L		T
No. 14 Northeast Louisiana $^	5	–	1	–	0	7	–	5	–	0
McNeese State	4	–	2	–	0	5	–	6	–	0
Southwest Texas State	3	–	3	–	0	6	–	5	–	0
Northwestern State	3	–	3	–	0	5	–	6	–	0
Sam Houston State	3	–	3	–	0	4	–	7	–	0
North Texas	2	–	4	–	0	6	–	5	–	0
Stephen F. Austin	1	–	5	–	0	1	–	10	–	0
$ – Conference champion; ^ – NCAA Division I-AA playoff participant; Rankings from NCAA Division I-AA Football Committee poll

The 1990 Sam Houston State Bearkats football team represented Sam Houston State University as a member of the Southland Conference during the 1990 NCAA Division I-AA football season. Led by ninth-year head coach Ron Randleman, the Bearkats compiled an overall record of 4–7 with a mark of 3–3 in conference play, and finished tied for third in the Southland.

== Schedule ==
Date	Opponent	Site	Result	Attendance	Source
September 8	vs. Texas Southern*	Public Schools Stadium; Galveston, TX (Galveston Beach Kickoff Classic)	L 15–20	8,000	
September 15	Angelo State*	Bowers Stadium; Huntsville, TX	W 12–0	8,000	
September 22	at Baylor*	Floyd Casey Stadium; Waco, TX	L 9–13	34,461	
September 29	at UTEP*	Sun Bowl; El Paso, TX	L 10–17	21,801	
October 6	at Nicholls State*	John L. Guidry Stadium; Thibodaux, LA	L 16–28		
October 13	at No. 14 Northeast Louisiana	Malone Stadium; Monroe, LA	L 10–27		
October 20	Stephen F. Austin	Bowers Stadium; Huntsville, TX (Battle of the Piney Woods)	W 23–3	9,423	
October 27	North Texas	Bowers Stadium; Huntsville, TX	W 26–14	8,126	
November 3	at Northwestern State	Harry Turpin Stadium; Natchitoches, LA	L 10–27	4,600	
November 10	at McNeese State	Cowboy Stadium; Lake Charles, LA	L 6–13		
November 17	No. 20 Southwest Texas State	Bowers Stadium; Huntsville, TX (rivalry)	W 26–25		
*Non-conference game; Rankings from NCAA Division I-AA Football Committee Poll released prior to the game
