= 1990 Bethune–Cookman Wildcats football team =

American college football season

1990 Bethune–Cookman Wildcats football
- Conference: Mid-Eastern Athletic Conference
- Record: 4–7 (1–5 MEAC)
- Head coach: Larry Little (8th season)
- Home stadium: Municipal Stadium

1990 Mid-Eastern Athletic Conference football standings
	Conf.					Overall
Team	W		L		T	W		L		T
Florida A&M $	6	–	0	–	0	7	–	4	–	0
No. T–19 North Carolina A&T	5	–	1	–	0	9	–	2	–	0
Delaware State	4	–	2	–	0	7	–	3	–	0
Howard	3	–	3	–	0	6	–	5	–	0
South Carolina State	2	–	4	–	0	4	–	6	–	0
Bethune–Cookman	1	–	5	–	0	4	–	7	–	0
Morgan State	0	–	6	–	0	1	–	10	–	0
$ – Conference champion; Rankings from NCAA Division I-AA Football Committee poll

The 1990 Bethune–Cookman Wildcats football team represented Bethune–Cookman College (now known as Bethune–Cookman University) as a member of the Mid-Eastern Athletic Conference (MEAC) during the 1990 NCAA Division I-AA football season. Led by eighth-year head coach Larry Little, the Wildcats compiled an overall record of 4–7, with a mark of 1–5 in conference play, and finished sixth in the MEAC.

== Schedule ==
Date	Opponent	Site	Result	Attendance	Source
September 1	vs. Savannah State*	Gator Bowl; Jacksonville, FL (Gateway Classic)	W 28–19	8,301	
September 8	at Morgan State	Hughes Stadium; Baltimore, MD	W 21–7		
September 15	UCF*	Municipal Stadium; Daytona Beach, FL	L 9–42	9,500	
September 29	vs. Delaware State	Lockhart Stadium; Fort Lauderdale, FL (South Florida Football Classic)	L 42–56		
October 6	at Howard	William H. Greene Stadium; Washington, DC	L 7–23		
October 13	at South Carolina State	Oliver C. Dawson Stadium; Orangeburg, SC	L 7–26	17,936	
October 20	Albany State*	Municipal Stadium; Daytona Beach, FL	L 6–36	6,500	
October 27	at No. T–20 North Carolina A&T	Aggie Stadium; Greensboro, NC	L 20–27	22,000	
November 3	Elizabeth City State*	Municipal Stadium; Daytona Beach, FL	W 24–20	9,150	
November 10	at Morris Brown*	Herndon Stadium; Atlanta, GA	W 21–14	3,000	
November 24	vs. Florida A&M	Tampa Stadium; Tampa, FL (Florida Classic)	L 20–42	42,330	
*Non-conference game; Rankings from NCAA Division I-AA Football Committee Poll released prior to the game
