= 1990 Howard Bison football team =

American college football season

1990 Howard Bison football
- Conference: Mid-Eastern Athletic Conference
- Record: 6–5 (3–3 MEAC)
- Head coach: Steve Wilson (2nd season)
- Home stadium: William H. Greene Stadium

1990 Mid-Eastern Athletic Conference football standings
	Conf.					Overall
Team	W		L		T	W		L		T
Florida A&M $	6	–	0	–	0	7	–	4	–	0
No. T–19 North Carolina A&T	5	–	1	–	0	9	–	2	–	0
Delaware State	4	–	2	–	0	7	–	3	–	0
Howard	3	–	3	–	0	6	–	5	–	0
South Carolina State	2	–	4	–	0	4	–	6	–	0
Bethune–Cookman	1	–	5	–	0	4	–	7	–	0
Morgan State	0	–	6	–	0	1	–	10	–	0
$ – Conference champion; Rankings from NCAA Division I-AA Football Committee poll

The 1990 Howard Bison football team represented Howard University as a member of the Mid-Eastern Athletic Conference (MEAC) during the 1990 NCAA Division I-AA football season. Led by second-year head coach Steve Wilson, the Bison compiled an overall record of 6–5, with a conference record of 3–3, and finished fourth in the MEAC.

== Schedule ==
Date	Opponent	Site	Result	Attendance	Source
September 2	vs. Southern*	Los Angeles Memorial Coliseum; Los Angeles, CA (Los Angeles Football Classic)	W 26–21	46,835	
September 8	Morris Brown*	William H. Greene Stadium; Washington, DC	W 29–0	10,205	
September 22	at South Carolina State	Oliver C. Dawson Stadium; Orangeburg, SC	W 23–20 ^{OT}	11,870	
September 29	at Morehouse*	B. T. Harvey Stadium; Atlanta, GA	W 44–7	10,250	
October 6	Bethune–Cookman	William H. Greene Stadium; Washington, DC	W 23–7		
October 13	at Virginia State*	Rogers Stadium; Ettrick, VA	L 14–19	10,500	
October 20	North Carolina A&T	Robert F. Kennedy Memorial Stadium; Washington, DC	L 12–33	35,123	
October 27	at Towson State*	Minnegan Field; Towson, MD	L 7–17		
November 3	Morgan State	William H. Greene Stadium; Washington, DC (rivalry)	W 49–13	4,713	
November 10	at Florida A&M	Bragg Memorial Stadium; Tallahassee, FL	L 20–39	10,737	
November 17	Delaware State	William H. Greene Stadium; Washington, DC	L 14–29		
*Non-conference game
