= 1990 Idaho State Bengals football team =

American college football season

1990 Idaho State Bengals football
- Conference: Big Sky Conference
- Record: 3–8 (1–7 Big Sky)
- Head coach: Garth Hall (3rd season)
- Home stadium: Holt Arena

1990 Big Sky Conference football standings
	Conf.					Overall
Team	W		L		T	W		L		T
No. 4 Nevada $^	7	–	1	–	0	13	–	2	–	0
No. 10 Boise State ^	6	–	2	–	0	10	–	4	–	0
No. 13 Idaho ^	6	–	2	–	0	9	–	4	–	0
Montana	4	–	4	–	0	7	–	4	–	0
Northern Arizona	3	–	5	–	0	5	–	6	–	0
Weber State	3	–	5	–	0	5	–	6	–	0
Eastern Washington	3	–	5	–	0	5	–	6	–	0
Montana State	3	–	5	–	0	4	–	7	–	0
Idaho State	1	–	7	–	0	3	–	8	–	0
$ – Conference champion; ^ – NCAA Division I-AA playoff participant; Rankings from NCAA Division I-AA Poll

The 1990 Idaho State Bengals football team represented Idaho State University as a member of the Big Sky Conference during the 1990 NCAA Division I-AA football season. Led by third-year head coach Garth Hall, the Bengals compiled an overall record of 3–8, with a mark of 1–7 in conference play, and finished ninth in the Big Sky.

== Schedule ==
Date	Opponent	Site	Result	Attendance	Source
September 8	Southern Utah*	Holt Arena; Pocatello, ID	W 37–12	5,578	
September 15	at Weber State	Wildcat Stadium; Ogden, UT	L 38–45 ^{2OT}	11,097	
September 22	Northern Iowa*	Holt Arena; Pocatello, ID	L 10–44	6,016	
September 29	at Northern Arizona	Walkup Skydome; Flagstaff, AZ	L 32–35	5,626	
October 6	No. 5 Nevada	Holt Arena; Pocatello, ID	L 10–17	6,058	
October 13	at Idaho	Kibbie Dome; Moscow, ID (rivalry)	L 20–41	14,100	
October 20	at Montana State	Sales Stadium; Bozeman, MT	W 23–19	7,347	
October 27	No. 9 Boise State	Holt Arena; Pocatello, ID	L 16–44	8,166	
November 3	Eastern Washington	Holt Arena; Pocatello, ID	L 26–33 ^{OT}	5,025	
November 10	Mesa State*	Holt Arena; Pocatello, ID	W 30–27		
November 17	Montana	Holt Arena; Pocatello, ID	L 23–42	5,216	
*Non-conference game; Rankings from NCAA Division I-AA Football Committee Poll released prior to the game
