= 1990 Southern Jaguars football team =

American college football season

1990 Southern Jaguars football
- Conference: Southwestern Athletic Conference
- Record: 4–7 (2–4 SWAC)
- Head coach: Gerald Kimble (2nd season)
- Defensive coordinator: Sherman Simmons (2nd season)
- Home stadium: A. W. Mumford Stadium

1990 Southwestern Athletic Conference football standings
	Conf.					Overall
Team	W		L		T	W		L		T
No. 16 Jackson State $^	5	–	1	–	0	8	–	4	–	0
Alabama State	4	–	2	–	0	8	–	2	–	1
Grambling State	3	–	3	–	0	8	–	3	–	0
Mississippi Valley State	3	–	3	–	0	5	–	6	–	0
Southern	2	–	4	–	0	4	–	7	–	0
Texas Southern	2	–	4	–	0	4	–	7	–	0
Alcorn State	2	–	4	–	0	2	–	7	–	0
$ – Conference champion; ^ – NCAA Division I-AA playoff participant; Rankings from NCAA Division I-AA Football Committee poll

The 1990 Southern Jaguars football team represented Southern University as a member of the Southwestern Athletic Conference (SWAC) during the 1990 NCAA Division I-AA football season. Led by second-year head coach Gerald Kimble, the Jaguars compiled an overall record of 4–7, with a conference mark of 2–4, and finished tied for fifth in the SWAC.

== Schedule ==
Date	Opponent	Site	Result	Attendance	Source
September 2	vs. Howard*	Los Angeles Memorial Coliseum; Los Angeles, CA (Los Angeles Football Classic)	L 21–26	46,835	
September 8	Alabama State	A. W. Mumford Stadium; Baton Rouge, LA	W 7–6	14,579	
September 15	at Texas Southern	Rice Stadium; Houston, TX	L 16–26		
September 29	Mississippi Valley State	A. W. Mumford Stadium; Baton Rouge, LA	W 42–22		
October 6	Arkansas–Pine Bluff*	A. W. Mumford Stadium; Baton Rouge, LA	W 16–12		
October 13	Jackson State	A. W. Mumford Stadium; Baton Rouge, LA (rivalry)	L 14–52		
October 20	at Alcorn State	Henderson Stadium; Lorman, MS	L 14–24		
November 3	Florida A&M*	A. W. Mumford Stadium; Baton Rouge, LA	W 48–30		
November 10	at Tennessee State*	Vanderbilt Stadium; Nashville, TN	L 21–31	31,400	
November 17	at Nicholls State*	John L. Guidry Stadium; Thibodaux, LA	L 19–23		
November 24	vs. Grambling State	Louisiana Superdome; New Orleans, LA (Bayou Classic)	L 13–25	70,600	
*Non-conference game
