= 1990 Alcorn State Braves football team =

American college football season

1990 Alcorn State Braves football
- Conference: Southwestern Athletic Conference
- Record: 3–6 (2–4 SWAC)
- Head coach: Theophilus Danzy (5th season)
- Home stadium: Henderson Stadium

1990 Southwestern Athletic Conference football standings
	Conf.					Overall
Team	W		L		T	W		L		T
No. 16 Jackson State $^	5	–	1	–	0	8	–	4	–	0
Alabama State	4	–	2	–	0	8	–	2	–	1
Grambling State	3	–	3	–	0	8	–	3	–	0
Mississippi Valley State	3	–	3	–	0	5	–	6	–	0
Southern	2	–	4	–	0	4	–	7	–	0
Texas Southern	2	–	4	–	0	4	–	7	–	0
Alcorn State	2	–	4	–	0	2	–	7	–	0
$ – Conference champion; ^ – NCAA Division I-AA playoff participant; Rankings from NCAA Division I-AA Football Committee poll

The 1990 Alcorn State Braves football team represented Alcorn State University as a member of the Southwestern Athletic Conference (SWAC) during the 1990 NCAA Division I-AA football season. Led by fifth-year head coach Theophilus Danzy, the Braves compiled an overall record of 3–6, with a conference record of 2–4, and finished tied for fifth in the SWAC.

== Schedule ==
Date	Opponent	Site	Result	Attendance	Source
September 1	vs. Grambling State	Independence Stadium; Shreveport, LA (Red River Classic)	L 13–42	36,759	
September 8	at North Texas*	Fouts Field; Denton, TX	L 7–20	14,125	
September 15	Alabama State	Henderson Stadium; Lorman, MS	L 3–41		
September 22	at Arkansas–Pine Bluff*	Pumphrey Stadium; Pine Bluff, AR	W 7–25 (forfeit win)		
October 6	Texas Southern	Henderson Stadium; Lorman, MS	W 31–26		
October 13	Southwest Missouri State*	Henderson Stadium; Lorman, MS	L 0–38		
October 20	Southern	Henderson Stadium; Lorman, MS	W 24–14		
November 3	at Mississippi Valley State	Magnolia Stadium; Itta Bena, MS	L 23–24		
November 17	at No. 16 Jackson State	Mississippi Veterans Memorial Stadium; Jackson, MS (Soul Bowl)	L 20–38	35,906	
*Non-conference game; Rankings from NCAA Division I-AA Football Committee Poll released prior to the game
