= 1990 Mississippi Valley State Delta Devils football team =

American college football season

1990 Mississippi Valley State Delta Devils football
- Conference: Southwestern Athletic Conference
- Record: 6–5 (3–3 SWAC)
- Head coach: Larry Dorsey (1st season)
- Home stadium: Magnolia Stadium

1990 Southwestern Athletic Conference football standings
	Conf.					Overall
Team	W		L		T	W		L		T
No. 16 Jackson State $^	5	–	1	–	0	8	–	4	–	0
Alabama State	4	–	2	–	0	8	–	2	–	1
Grambling State	3	–	3	–	0	8	–	3	–	0
Mississippi Valley State	3	–	3	–	0	5	–	6	–	0
Southern	2	–	4	–	0	4	–	7	–	0
Texas Southern	2	–	4	–	0	4	–	7	–	0
Alcorn State	2	–	4	–	0	2	–	7	–	0
$ – Conference champion; ^ – NCAA Division I-AA playoff participant; Rankings from NCAA Division I-AA Football Committee poll

The 1990 Mississippi Valley State Delta Devils football team represented Mississippi Valley State University as a member of the Southwestern Athletic Conference (SWAC) during the 1990 NCAA Division I-AA football season. Led by first-year head coach Larry Dorsey, the Delta Devils compiled an overall record of 6–5, with a conference record of 3–3, and finished tied for third in the SWAC.

== Schedule ==
Date	Opponent	Site	Result	Attendance	Source
September 1	Central Arkansas*	Magnolia Stadium; Itta Bena, MS	W 14–10	3,600	
September 8	vs. Arkansas–Pine Bluff*	Mississippi Veterans Memorial Stadium; Jackson, MS	W 6–38 (forfeit win)		
September 15	vs. Florida A&M*	Gator Bowl Stadium; Jacksonville, FL (Bold City Classic)	L 13–28	10,390	
September 22	at Jackson State	Mississippi Veterans Memorial Stadium; Jackson, MS	L 34–57		
September 29	at Southern	A. W. Mumford Stadium; Baton Rouge, LA	L 22–42		
October 13	No. 2 Grambling State	Magnolia Stadium; Itta Bena, MS	W 38–20		
October 20	at Texas Southern	Robertson Stadium; Houston, TX	W 24–21		
October 27	Miles*	Magnolia Stadium; Itta Bena, MS	W 49–0		
November 3	Alcorn State	Magnolia Stadium; Itta Bena, MS	W 24–23		
November 10	at Alabama State	Cramton Bowl; Montgomery, AL	L 6–43		
November 17	at Tennessee State*	Hale Stadium; Nashville, TN	L 7–45	7,700	
*Non-conference game; Rankings from NCAA Division I-AA Football Committee Poll released prior to the game
