= 1990 Delaware State Hornets football team =

American college football season

1990 Delaware State Hornets football
- Conference: Mid-Eastern Athletic Conference
- Record: 7–3 (4–2 MEAC)
- Head coach: Bill Collick (6th season)
- Home stadium: Alumni Stadium

1990 Mid-Eastern Athletic Conference football standings
	Conf.					Overall
Team	W		L		T	W		L		T
Florida A&M $	6	–	0	–	0	7	–	4	–	0
No. T–19 North Carolina A&T	5	–	1	–	0	9	–	2	–	0
Delaware State	4	–	2	–	0	7	–	3	–	0
Howard	3	–	3	–	0	6	–	5	–	0
South Carolina State	2	–	4	–	0	4	–	6	–	0
Bethune–Cookman	1	–	5	–	0	4	–	7	–	0
Morgan State	0	–	6	–	0	1	–	10	–	0
$ – Conference champion; Rankings from NCAA Division I-AA Football Committee poll

The 1990 Delaware State Hornets football team represented Delaware State College (now known as Delaware State University) as a member of the Mid-Eastern Athletic Conference (MEAC) during the 1990 NCAA Division I-AA football season. Led by sixth-year head coach Bill Collick, the Hornets compiled an overall record of 7–3, with a mark of 4–2 in conference play, and finished third in the MEAC.

== Schedule ==
Date	Opponent	Site	Result	Attendance	Source
September 1	at Jackson State*	Mississippi Veterans Memorial Stadium; Jackson, MS	L 7–31	19,700	
September 8	vs. Northeastern*	Baynard Stadium; Wilmington, DE (Wilmington Classic)	W 43–16	5,263	
September 22	Towson State*	Alumni Stadium; Dover, DE	W 24–13		
September 29	vs. Bethune–Cookman	Lockhart Stadium; Fort Lauderdale, FL (South Florida Football Classic)	W 56–42		
October 6	at No. 13 Liberty*	Willard May Stadium; Lynchburg, VA	W 38–37		
October 13	Florida A&M	Alumni Stadium; Dover, DE	L 38–43	4,738	
October 20	at Morgan State	Hughes Stadium; Baltimore, MD	W 28–7	17,750	
October 27	South Carolina State	Alumni Stadium; Dover, DE	W 39–0	8,643	
November 3	No. 18 North Carolina A&T	Alumni Stadium; Dover, DE	L 28–48		
November 17	at Howard	William H. Greene Stadium; Washington, DC	W 29–14		
*Non-conference game; Rankings from NCAA Division I-AA Football Committee Poll released prior to the game
