= 1990 South Carolina State Bulldogs football team =

American college football season

1990 South Carolina State Bulldogs football
- Conference: Mid-Eastern Athletic Conference
- Record: 4–6 (2–4 MEAC)
- Head coach: Willie Jeffries (8th season)
- Home stadium: Oliver C. Dawson Stadium

1990 Mid-Eastern Athletic Conference football standings
	Conf.					Overall
Team	W		L		T	W		L		T
Florida A&M $	6	–	0	–	0	7	–	4	–	0
No. T–19 North Carolina A&T	5	–	1	–	0	9	–	2	–	0
Delaware State	4	–	2	–	0	7	–	3	–	0
Howard	3	–	3	–	0	6	–	5	–	0
South Carolina State	2	–	4	–	0	4	–	6	–	0
Bethune–Cookman	1	–	5	–	0	4	–	7	–	0
Morgan State	0	–	6	–	0	1	–	10	–	0
$ – Conference champion; Rankings from NCAA Division I-AA Football Committee poll

The 1990 South Carolina State Bulldogs football team represented South Carolina State College (now known as South Carolina State University) as a member of the Mid-Eastern Athletic Conference (MEAC) during the 1990 NCAA Division I-AA football season. Led by eighth-year head coach Willie Jeffries, the Bulldogs compiled an overall record of 4–6 with a mark of 2–4 in conference play, placing fifth in the MEAC. South Carolina State played home games at Bulldog Stadium in Orangeburg, South Carolina.

== Schedule ==
Date	Opponent	Site	Result	Attendance	Source
September 1	at Furman*	Paladin Stadium; Greenville, SC	L 7–24	13,611	
September 15	at Presbyterian*	Bailey Stadium; Clinton, SC	W 41–0	4,000	
September 22	Howard	Oliver C. Dawson Stadium; Orangeburg, SC	L 20–23 ^{OT}	11,870	
September 29	Johnson C. Smith*	Oliver C. Dawson Stadium; Orangeburg, SC	W 17–0	13,581	
October 6	Morgan State	Oliver C. Dawson Stadium; Orangeburg, SC	W 42–0	8,266	
October 13	Bethune–Cookman	Oliver C. Dawson Stadium; Orangeburg, SC	W 26–7	17,936	
October 20	at Florida A&M	Bragg Memorial Stadium; Tallahassee, FL	L 17–37	28,150	
October 27	at Delaware State	Alumni Stadium; Dover, DE	L 0–39	8,643	
November 10	Grambling State*	Oliver C. Dawson Stadium; Orangeburg, SC	L 15–39		
November 17	at North Carolina A&T	Aggie Stadium; Greensboro, NC	L 6–7		
*Non-conference game

== Roster ==
1990 South Carolina State Bulldogs football team roster
Players			Coaches
Offense: Pos. / # / Name / Class	Defense: Pos. / # / Name / Class; DE / / Robert Porcher / Jr	Special teams: Pos. / # / Name / Class	Head coach: Willie E. Jeffries; Coordinators/assistant coaches Legend: (C) Team captain; (S) Suspended; (I) Ineligible; Injured; Redshirt
