= Steve Axman =

American football coach (born 1947)

Biographical details
- Born: June 10, 1947 (age 79); Huntington Station, New York, U.S.
- Education: C.W. Post Campus of Long Island University

Coaching career (HC unless noted)

Football
- 1973: MacArthur HS (NY)
- 1974: East Stroudsburg (DL)
- 1975: Albany (OL)
- 1976–1978: Army (assistant)
- 1979: Illinois (assistant)
- 1980–1984: Arizona (OC/QB)
- 1985: Denver Gold (OL)
- 1986: Stanford (OL)
- 1987: UCLA (OC/QB)
- 1988: UCLA (OC/OL)
- 1989: Maryland (QB)
- 1990–1997: Northern Arizona
- 1998: Minnesota (QB)
- 1999–2000: Washington (QB)
- 2001–2002: Washington (AHC/QB)
- 2003: UCLA (OC/QB)
- 2004: Washington (WR)
- 2006: Montana (QB)
- 2007–2009: Idaho (OC/TE)
- 2010–2011: Idaho (OC/QB)
- 2013: Simon Fraser (QB)
- 2014: Nicholls State (interim HC/QB)
- 2018: Arizona Rattlers (OC)
- 2019: Arizona Hotshots (QB)

Lacrosse
- 1976: Albany

Head coaching record
- Overall: 48–50 (football); 6–5 (lacrosse)
- Tournaments: Football; 0–1 (NCAA D-I-AA playoffs)

Steve Axman (born June 10, 1947) is an American football coach. He was the head football coach at Northern Arizona University from 1990 to 1997 and the interim head coach at Nicholls State University in 2014.

== Football coaching career ==
=== High school career ===
Axman was head coach at MacArthur High School in Levittown, New York in 1973.

=== College career ===
Axman began coaching in college in 1974 as a defensive line coach at East Stroudsburg University of Pennsylvania. In 1975, he was the offensive line coach at the University at Albany, SUNY. In 1976, Axman was head coach of the Albany Great Danes men's lacrosse team. In his one season as head coach, he compiled a record of 6–5.

From 1976 to 1978, he was an assistant coach for the Army Cadets football team at the United States Military Academy in West Point, New York. In 1979, he moved to the University of Illinois as an assistant coach for the Fighting Illini.

In 1980, he was hired for his first coordinator position as offensive coordinator and quarterbacks coach at the University of Arizona, a position he held through the 1984 season. In 1986, he moved to Stanford University as the offensive line coach after spending a year in the United States Football League (USFL). In 1987, he took a position with another Pac-10 Conference school, the University of California, Los Angeles (UCLA) as offensive coordinator and quarterbacks coach and then offensive co-ordinator and offensive line coach in 1988. For the 1989 season, he was quarterbacks coach at the University of Maryland.

In 1990, Axman became head coach at Northern Arizona University. During his eight seasons as head coach to 1997, he compiled an overall record of 48 wins and 41 losses and 28 wins and 32 losses in the Big Sky Conference.

In 1998, he moved to the University of Minnesota and became its quarterbacks coach. From 1999 to 2000, he was quarterbacks coach at the University of Washington. From 2001 to 2002, he remained quarterbacks coach at Washington, but added the title of assistant head coach. In 2003, Axman returned to the University of California, Los Angeles as offensive coordinator and quarterbacks coach before returning to the University of Washington the following season as wide receivers coach in 2004.

Axman did not coach during the 2005 season, but moved to the University of Montana as quarterbacks coach in 2006. From 2007 to 2009, he was offensive coordinator and tight ends coach at the University of Idaho. In 2013, he returned to coaching as the quarterbacks coach at Simon Fraser University in British Columbia, Canada. In mid-September 2014, he was residing in Arizona and was contacted and hired by Nicholls State University as interim head coach and quarterbacks coach for the remainder of the 2014 season after the head coach, Charlie Stubbs, resigned after three games due to health issues. At Nicholls State, Axman compiled a record of 0 wins and 9 losses.

=== Professional career ===
In 1985, Axman was the offensive line coach for the Denver Gold in the United States Football League. In 2018, he returned to professional football as the offensive co-ordinator of the Arizona Rattlers in the Indoor Football League. In 2019, he joined the Arizona Hotshots as quarterbacks coach in the Alliance of American Football.

== Head coaching record ==
=== Football ===
Year	Team	Overall	Conference	Standing	Bowl/playoffs	TSN^{#}
Northern Arizona Lumberjacks (Big Sky Conference) (1990–1997)
1990	Northern Arizona	5–6	3–5	T–5th		
1991	Northern Arizona	3–8	1–7	T–8th		
1992	Northern Arizona	4–7	2–5	T–6th		
1993	Northern Arizona	7–4	3–4	T–5th		
1994	Northern Arizona	7–4	4–3	T–4th		
1995	Northern Arizona	7–4	4–3	T–2nd		
1996	Northern Arizona	9–3	7–1	2nd	L NCAA Division I-AA First Round	8
1997	Northern Arizona	6–5	4–4	T–4th		
Northern Arizona:		48–41	28–32			
Nicholls State Colonels (Southland Conference) (2014)
2014	Nicholls State	0–9	0–8	11th		
Nicholls State:		0–9	0–8			
Total:		48–50				
^{#}Rankings from final The Sports Network Poll.
