= 1990 Stephen F. Austin Lumberjacks football team =

American college football season

1990 Stephen F. Austin Lumberjacks football
- Conference: Southland Conference
- Record: 1–10 (1–5 Southland)
- Head coach: Lynn Graves (2nd season)
- Home stadium: Homer Bryce Stadium

1990 Southland Conference football standings
	Conf.					Overall
Team	W		L		T	W		L		T
No. 14 Northeast Louisiana $^	5	–	1	–	0	7	–	5	–	0
McNeese State	4	–	2	–	0	5	–	6	–	0
Southwest Texas State	3	–	3	–	0	6	–	5	–	0
Northwestern State	3	–	3	–	0	5	–	6	–	0
Sam Houston State	3	–	3	–	0	4	–	7	–	0
North Texas	2	–	4	–	0	6	–	5	–	0
Stephen F. Austin	1	–	5	–	0	1	–	10	–	0
$ – Conference champion; ^ – NCAA Division I-AA playoff participant; Rankings from NCAA Division I-AA Football Committee poll

The 1990 Stephen F. Austin Lumberjacks football team was an American football team that represented Stephen F. Austin State University as a member of the Southland Conference during the 1990 NCAA Division I-AA football season. In their second year under head coach Lynn Graves, the team compiled an overall record of 1–10, with a mark of 1–5 in conference play, and finished seventh in the Southland.

== Schedule ==
Date	Opponent	Site	Result	Attendance	Source
September 1	at No. 12 Boise State*	Bronco Stadium; Boise, ID	L 10–14	19,312	
September 8	No. 4 (D-II) Angelo State*	Homer Bryce Stadium; Nacogdoches, TX	L 24–28		
September 22	at Nicholls State*	John L. Guidry Stadium; Thibodaux, LA	L 41–23 (forfeit)		
September 29	Jackson State*	Homer Bryce Stadium; Nacogdoches, TX	L 30–39	14,186	
October 6	at Southwest Texas State	Bobcat Stadium; San Marcos, TX	L 0–24		
October 13	No. 15 North Texas	Homer Bryce Stadium; Nacogdoches, TX	L 24–31	8,261	
October 20	at Sam Houston State	Bowers Stadium; Huntsville, TX (rivalry)	L 3–23	9,423	
October 27	at Louisiana Tech*	Joe Aillet Stadium; Ruston, LA	L 22–31	17,600	
November 3	McNeese State	Homer Bryce Stadium; Nacogdoches, TX	W 30–9	11,387	
November 10	at Northeast Louisiana	Malone Stadium; Monroe, LA	L 3–10		
November 17	Northwestern State	Homer Bryce Stadium; Nacogdoches, TX (rivalry)	L 3–20		
*Non-conference game; Rankings from NCAA Division I-AA Football Committee Poll released prior to the game
