= 1990 Southwest Missouri State Bears football team =

American college football season

1990 Southwest Missouri State Bears football

GFC co-champion

NCAA Division I-AA First Round, L 35–41 at Idaho
- Conference: Gateway Football Conference
- Record: 9–3 (5–1 GFC)
- Head coach: Jesse Branch (5th season)
- Defensive coordinator: Dave Wommack (5th season)
- Captains: Doug Adams; Chris Reed; DeAndre Smith
- Home stadium: Briggs Stadium

1990 Gateway Collegiate Athletic Conference football standings
	Conf.					Overall
Team	W		L		T	W		L		T
No. 6 Southwest Missouri State +^	5	–	1	–	0	9	–	3	–	0
No. 11 Northern Iowa +^	5	–	1	–	0	8	–	4	–	0
Eastern Illinois	3	–	3	–	0	5	–	6	–	0
Illinois State	3	–	3	–	0	5	–	6	–	0
Western Illinois	3	–	3	–	0	3	–	8	–	0
Indiana State	1	–	5	–	0	4	–	7	–	0
Southern Illinois	1	–	5	–	0	2	–	9	–	0
+ – Conference co-champions; ^ – NCAA Division I-AA playoff participant; Rankings from NCAA Division I-AA Football Committee poll

The 1990 Southwest Missouri State Bears football team represented Southwest Missouri State University (now known as Missouri State University) as a member of the Gateway Football Conference (GFC) during the 1990 NCAA Division I-AA football season. Led by fifth-year head coach Jesse Branch, the Bears compiled an overall record of 9–3, with a mark of 5–1 in conference play, and finished as GFC co-champion. Southwest Missouri State advanced to the NCAA Division I-AA First Round and were defeated by Idaho.

== Schedule ==
Date	Time	Opponent	Rank	Site	Result	Attendance	Source
September 1		at UNLV*		Sam Boyd Silver Bowl; Whitney, NV	W 31–24	17,659	
September 8		at Tulsa*		Skelly Stadium; Tulsa, OK	L 28–41	22,590	
September 15		at Indiana State		Memorial Stadium; Terre Haute, IN	W 33–26	7,578	
September 22		Austin Peay*	No. 6	Briggs Stadium; Springfield, MO	W 34–7	10,100	
September 29		Washburn*	No. 6	Briggs Stadium; Springfield, MO	W 38–3	9,528	
October 6		Southern Illinois	No. 3	Briggs Stadium; Springfield, MO	W 31–7	8,810	
October 13		at Alcorn State*	No. 3	Henderson Stadium; Lorman, MS	W 38–0		
October 20		at Illinois State	No. 2	Hancock Stadium; Normal, IL	W 45–30	11,936	
October 27		Western Illinois	No. 2	Briggs Stadium; Springfield, MO	W 35–14	10,721	
November 3	7:00 p.m.	at No. 17 Northern Iowa	No. 2	UNI-Dome; Cedar Falls, IA	L 17–20	16,324	
November 10		Eastern Illinois	No. 8	Briggs Stadium; Springfield, MO	W 48–6		
November 24		No. 13 Idaho*	No. 6	Briggs Stadium; Springfield, MO (Div. I-AA First Round)	L 35–41	8,750	
*Non-conference game; Rankings from NCAA Division I-AA Football Committee Poll released prior to the game; All times are in Central time
