= 1990 Weber State Wildcats football team =

American college football season

1990 Weber State Wildcats football
- Conference: Big Sky Conference
- Record: 5–6 (3–5 Big Sky)
- Head coach: Dave Arslanian (2nd season)
- Home stadium: Wildcat Stadium

1990 Big Sky Conference football standings
	Conf.					Overall
Team	W		L		T	W		L		T
No. 4 Nevada $^	7	–	1	–	0	13	–	2	–	0
No. 10 Boise State ^	6	–	2	–	0	10	–	4	–	0
No. 13 Idaho ^	6	–	2	–	0	9	–	4	–	0
Montana	4	–	4	–	0	7	–	4	–	0
Northern Arizona	3	–	5	–	0	5	–	6	–	0
Weber State	3	–	5	–	0	5	–	6	–	0
Eastern Washington	3	–	5	–	0	5	–	6	–	0
Montana State	3	–	5	–	0	4	–	7	–	0
Idaho State	1	–	7	–	0	3	–	8	–	0
$ – Conference champion; ^ – NCAA Division I-AA playoff participant; Rankings from NCAA Division I-AA Poll

The 1990 Weber State Wildcats football team represented Weber State University as a member of the Big Sky Conference during the 1990 NCAA Division I-AA football season. Led by second-year head coach Dave Arslanian, the Wildcats compiled an overall record of 5–6 with a mark of 3–5 in conference play, placing in four-way tie for fifth in the Big Sky. Weber State played home games at Wildcat Stadium in Ogden, Utah.

== Schedule ==
Date	Opponent	Site	Result	Attendance	Source
September 1	at Southern Utah*	Thunderbird Stadium; Cedar City, UT	W 37–21	4,489	
September 8	at No. 12 Boise State	Bronco Stadium; Boise, ID	L 14–24	19,521	
September 15	Idaho State	Wildcat Stadium; Ogden, UT	W 45–38 ^{2OT}	11,097	
September 22	at Idaho	Wildcat Stadium; Ogden, UT	L 27–37	8,100	
September 29	Montana State	Wildcat Stadium; Ogden, UT	W 32–20	7,193	
October 6	at No. 10 Eastern Washington	Woodward Field; Cheney, WA	W 36–34	5,400	
October 13	Montana	Wildcat Stadium; Ogden, UT	L 37–39	6,980	
October 20	at No. 21 (I-A) Wyoming*	War Memorial Stadium; Laramie, WY	L 12–21	12,959	
October 27	No. 3 Nevada	Wildcat Stadium; Ogden, UT	L 7–28	6,895	
November 10	at Northern Arizona	Walkup Skydome; Flagstaff, AZ	L 35–38	4,549	
November 17	at McNeese State*	Cowboy Stadium; Lake Charles, LA	W 27–7		
*Non-conference game; Rankings from NCAA Division I-AA Football Committee Poll released prior to the game
