= 1990 Eastern Washington Eagles football team =

American college football season

1990 Eastern Washington Eagles football
- Conference: Big Sky Conference
- Record: 5–6 (3–5 Big Sky)
- Head coach: Dick Zornes (12th season)
- Home stadium: Joe Albi Stadium; Woodward Field

1990 Big Sky Conference football standings
| | Conf. | | | | | Overall |
| Team | W | | L | | T | W | | L | | T |
|---|---|---|---|---|---|---|---|---|---|---|
| No. 4 Nevada $^ | 7 | – | 1 | – | 0 | 13 | – | 2 | – | 0 |
| No. 10 Boise State ^ | 6 | – | 2 | – | 0 | 10 | – | 4 | – | 0 |
| No. 13 Idaho ^ | 6 | – | 2 | – | 0 | 9 | – | 4 | – | 0 |
| Montana | 4 | – | 4 | – | 0 | 7 | – | 4 | – | 0 |
| Northern Arizona | 3 | – | 5 | – | 0 | 5 | – | 6 | – | 0 |
| Weber State | 3 | – | 5 | – | 0 | 5 | – | 6 | – | 0 |
| Eastern Washington | 3 | – | 5 | – | 0 | 5 | – | 6 | – | 0 |
| Montana State | 3 | – | 5 | – | 0 | 4 | – | 7 | – | 0 |
| Idaho State | 1 | – | 7 | – | 0 | 3 | – | 8 | – | 0 |
$ – Conference champion; ^ – NCAA Division I-AA playoff participant; Rankings from NCAA Division I-AA Poll

The 1990 Eastern Washington Eagles football team was an American football team that represented Eastern Washington University as a member of the Big Sky Conference during the 1990 NCAA Division I-AA football season. Led by 12th-year head coach Dick Zornes, the Eagles compiled an overall record of 5–6, with a mark of 3–5 in conference play, and finished tied for fifth in the Big Sky.

== Schedule ==
| Date | Opponent | Rank | Site | Result | Attendance | Source |
|---|---|---|---|---|---|---|
| September 8 | Lenoir–Rhyne* | | Woodward Field; Cheney, WA | W 45–6 | | |
| September 15 | No. 12 Boise State | | Woodward Field; Cheney, WA | W 16–10 | 4,200 | |
| September 22 | at Northern Arizona | No. 10 | Walkup Skydome; Flagstaff, AZ | L 24–31 | 6,528 | |
| September 29 | No. 2 Montana | No. 20 | Washington–Grizzly Stadium; Missoula, MT (rivalry) | W 36–35 | 15,147 | |
| October 6 | Weber State | No. 10 | Woodward Field; Cheney, WA | L 34–36 | 5,400 | |
| October 13 | at No. 4 Nevada | No. 19 | Mackay Stadium; Reno, NV | L 17–40 | 18,085 | |
| October 20 | Idaho | | Joe Albi Stadium; Spokane, WA | L 28–51 | 7,500 | |
| October 27 | at Portland State* | | Civic Stadium; Portland, OR | W 21–13 | 9,124 | |
| November 3 | at Idaho State | | Holt Arena; Pocatello, ID | W 33–26 ^{OT} | 5,025 | |
| November 10 | Montana State | | Woodward Field; Cheney, WA | L 25–28 ^{2OT} | 3,324 | |
| November 17 | at No. 12 (I-A) Houston* | | Houston Astrodome; Houston, TX | L 21–84 | 17,050 | |
*Non-conference game; Rankings from NCAA Division I-AA Football Committee Poll released prior to the game
