= 1990 Grambling State Tigers football team =

American college football season

1990 Grambling State Tigers football
- Conference: Southwestern Athletic Conference
- Record: 8–3 (3–3 SWAC)
- Head coach: Eddie Robinson (48th season)
- Home stadium: Eddie G. Robinson Memorial Stadium

1990 Southwestern Athletic Conference football standings
	Conf.					Overall
Team	W		L		T	W		L		T
No. 16 Jackson State $^	5	–	1	–	0	8	–	4	–	0
Alabama State	4	–	2	–	0	8	–	2	–	1
Grambling State	3	–	3	–	0	8	–	3	–	0
Mississippi Valley State	3	–	3	–	0	5	–	6	–	0
Southern	2	–	4	–	0	4	–	7	–	0
Texas Southern	2	–	4	–	0	4	–	7	–	0
Alcorn State	2	–	4	–	0	2	–	7	–	0
$ – Conference champion; ^ – NCAA Division I-AA playoff participant; Rankings from NCAA Division I-AA Football Committee poll

The 1990 Grambling State Tigers football team represented Grambling State University as a member of the Southwestern Athletic Conference (SWAC) during the 1990 NCAA Division I-AA football season. Led by 48th-year head coach Eddie Robinson, the Tigers compiled an overall record of 8–3 and a mark of 3–3 in conference play, and finished tied for third in the SWAC.

== Schedule ==
Date	Opponent	Rank	Site	Result	Attendance	Source
September 1	vs. Alcorn State		Independence Stadium; Shreveport, LA (Red River Classic)	W 42–13	36,759	
September 15	Tennessee State*		Eddie G. Robinson Memorial Stadium; Grambling, LA	W 37–20		
September 22	vs. Hampton*	No. 5	Giants Stadium; East Rutherford, NJ (Whitney Young Memorial Classic)	W 22–3	28,894	
September 29	vs. Elizabeth City State*	No. 5	Cotton Bowl; Dallas, TX (State Fair Classic)	W 67–3	54,986	
October 6	vs. Alabama A&M*	No. 2	Hoosier Dome; Indianapolis, IN (Circle City Classic)	W 27–20	61,929	
October 13	at Mississippi Valley State	No. 2	Magnolia Stadium; Itta Bena, MS	L 20–38		
October 20	No. 16 Jackson State	No. 12	Eddie G. Robinson Memorial Stadium; Grambling, LA	L 19–29	14,496	
October 27	at Texas Southern		Rice Stadium; Houston, TX	W 52–36	20,000	
November 3	Alabama State^{†}		Eddie G. Robinson Memorial Stadium; Grambling, LA	L 14–37		
November 10	at South Carolina State*		Oliver C. Dawson Stadium; Orangeburg, SC	W 39–15		
November 24	vs. Southern		Louisiana Superdome; New Orleans, LA (Bayou Classic)	W 25–13	70,600	
*Non-conference game; ^{†}Homecoming; Rankings from NCAA Division I-AA Football Committee Poll released prior to the game
