= 1990 Montana Grizzlies football team =

American college football season

1990 Montana Grizzlies football
- Conference: Big Sky Conference
- Record: 7–4 (4–4 Big Sky)
- Head coach: Don Read (5th season)
- Offensive coordinator: Tommy Lee (5th season)
- Defensive coordinator: Jerome Souers (1st season)
- Home stadium: Washington–Grizzly Stadium

1990 Big Sky Conference football standings
	Conf.					Overall
Team	W		L		T	W		L		T
No. 4 Nevada $^	7	–	1	–	0	13	–	2	–	0
No. 10 Boise State ^	6	–	2	–	0	10	–	4	–	0
No. 13 Idaho ^	6	–	2	–	0	9	–	4	–	0
Montana	4	–	4	–	0	7	–	4	–	0
Northern Arizona	3	–	5	–	0	5	–	6	–	0
Weber State	3	–	5	–	0	5	–	6	–	0
Eastern Washington	3	–	5	–	0	5	–	6	–	0
Montana State	3	–	5	–	0	4	–	7	–	0
Idaho State	1	–	7	–	0	3	–	8	–	0
$ – Conference champion; ^ – NCAA Division I-AA playoff participant; Rankings from NCAA Division I-AA Poll

The 1990 Montana Grizzlies football team represented the University of Montana in the 1990 NCAA Division I-AA football season as a member of the Big Sky Conference. The Grizzlies were led by fifth-year head coach Don Read and played their home games on campus in Missoula at Washington–Grizzly Stadium. They finished the season with a 7–4 record, 4–4 in the Big Sky.

== Schedule ==
Date	Opponent	Rank	Site	Result	Attendance	Source
September 1	at Oregon State*	No. 6	Parker Stadium; Corvallis, OR	W 22–15	25,201	
September 15	Thomas More*	No. 6	Washington–Grizzly Stadium; Missoula, MT	W 62–0	10,461	
September 22	McNeese State*	No. 3	Washington–Grizzly Stadium; Missoula, MT	W 45–22	11,087	
September 29	No. 20 Eastern Washington	No. 2	Washington–Grizzly Stadium; Missoula, MT (rivalry)	L 35–36	15,147	
October 6	at No. 19 Boise State	No. 8	Bronco Stadium; Boise, ID	L 3–41	22,149	
October 13	at Weber State		Wildcat Stadium; Ogden, UT	W 39–37	6,980	
October 20	Northern Arizona	No. 17	Washington–Grizzly Stadium; Missoula, MT	W 48–14	10,064	
October 27	Montana State	No. 14	Washington–Grizzly Stadium; Missoula, MT (rivalry)	W 35–18	15,345	
November 3	at No. 3 Nevada	No. 14	Mackay Stadium; Reno, NV	L 27–34	19,530	
November 10	No. 17 Idaho	No. 19	Washington–Grizzly Stadium; Missoula, MT (Little Brown Stein)	L 14–35	10,720	
November 17	at Idaho State		Holt Arena; Pocatello, ID	W 42–23	5,216	
*Non-conference game; Rankings from NCAA Division I-AA Football Committee Poll released prior to the game
