= 1990 Florida A&M Rattlers football team =

American college football season

1990 Florida A&M Rattlers football

MEAC champion
- Conference: Mid-Eastern Athletic Conference
- Record: 7–4 (6–0 MEAC)
- Head coach: Ken Riley (5th season)
- Offensive coordinator: Kent Schoolfield (2nd season)
- Home stadium: Bragg Memorial Stadium

1990 Mid-Eastern Athletic Conference football standings
	Conf.					Overall
Team	W		L		T	W		L		T
Florida A&M $	6	–	0	–	0	7	–	4	–	0
No. T–19 North Carolina A&T	5	–	1	–	0	9	–	2	–	0
Delaware State	4	–	2	–	0	7	–	3	–	0
Howard	3	–	3	–	0	6	–	5	–	0
South Carolina State	2	–	4	–	0	4	–	6	–	0
Bethune–Cookman	1	–	5	–	0	4	–	7	–	0
Morgan State	0	–	6	–	0	1	–	10	–	0
$ – Conference champion; Rankings from NCAA Division I-AA Football Committee poll

The 1990 Florida A&M Rattlers football team represented Florida A&M University as a member of the Mid-Eastern Athletic Conference (MEAC) during the 1990 NCAA Division I-AA football season. Led by fifth-year head coach Ken Riley, the Rattlers compiled an overall record of 7–4, with a mark of 6–0 in conference play, and finished as MEAC champion.

== Schedule ==
Date	Opponent	Site	Result	Attendance	Source
September 1	Tuskegee*	Bragg Memorial Stadium; Tallahassee, FL	L 34–39	12,723	
September 15	vs. Mississippi Valley State*	Gator Bowl Stadium; Jacksonville, FL (Bold City Classic)	W 28–13	10,390	
September 22	vs. Tennessee State*	Bobby Dodd Stadium; Atlanta, GA (Atlanta Football Classic)	L 16–20	46,024	
September 29	vs. Alabama State*	Ladd Stadium; Mobile, AL (Gulf Coast Classic)	L 32–44	20,000	
October 6	North Carolina A&T	Bragg Memorial Stadium; Tallahassee, FL	W 17–15	11,379	
October 13	at Delaware State	Alumni Stadium; Dover, DE	W 43–38	4,738	
October 20	South Carolina State	Bragg Memorial Stadium; Tallahassee, FL	W 37–17	28,150	
October 27	vs. Morgan State	Miami Orange Bowl; Miami, FL (Orange Blossom Classic)	W 31–15	12,191	
November 3	at Southern*	A. W. Mumford Stadium; Baton Rouge, LA	L 30–48		
November 10	Howard	Bragg Memorial Stadium; Tallahassee, FL	W 39–20	10,737	
November 24	vs. Bethune–Cookman	Tampa Stadium; Tampa, FL (Florida Classic)	W 42–20	42,330	
*Non-conference game
