= 1990 Eastern Illinois Panthers football team =

American college football season

1990 Eastern Illinois Panthers football
- Conference: Gateway Collegiate Athletic Conference
- Record: 5–6 (3–3 GCAC)
- Head coach: Bob Spoo (4th season)
- Offensive coordinator: Roy Wittke (1st season)
- Home stadium: O'Brien Stadium

1990 Gateway Collegiate Athletic Conference football standings
	Conf.					Overall
Team	W		L		T	W		L		T
No. 6 Southwest Missouri State +^	5	–	1	–	0	9	–	3	–	0
No. 11 Northern Iowa +^	5	–	1	–	0	8	–	4	–	0
Eastern Illinois	3	–	3	–	0	5	–	6	–	0
Illinois State	3	–	3	–	0	5	–	6	–	0
Western Illinois	3	–	3	–	0	3	–	8	–	0
Indiana State	1	–	5	–	0	4	–	7	–	0
Southern Illinois	1	–	5	–	0	2	–	9	–	0
+ – Conference co-champions; ^ – NCAA Division I-AA playoff participant; Rankings from NCAA Division I-AA Football Committee poll

The 1990 Eastern Illinois Panthers football team represented Eastern Illinois University during the 1990 NCAA Division I-AA football season. The Panthers played their home games at O'Brien Stadium in Charleston, Illinois.

== Schedule ==
Date	Opponent	Rank	Site	Result	Attendance	Source
September 1	at Northern Illinois*	No. T–17	Huskie Stadium; DeKalb, IL	L 17–28	12,380	
September 8	at Northwestern State*	No. T–17	Harry Turpin Stadium; Natchitoches, LA	W 23–22		
September 15	McNeese State*	No. T–17	O'Brien Stadium; Charleston, IL	L 7–15	6,408	
September 22	at Murray State*		Roy Stewart Stadium; Murray, KY	L 10–14	7,184	
September 29	at Illinois State		Hancock Stadium; Normal, IL (rivalry)	L 7–28	12,164	
October 6	at Western Illinois		Hanson Field; Macomb, IL	W 27–17	9,181	
October 13	Indiana State		O'Brien Stadium; Charleston, IL	W 31–22	7,219	
October 20	Southern Illinois		O'Brien Stadium; Charleston, IL	W 14–3	3,728	
October 27	No. 17 Northern Iowa		O'Brien Stadium; Charleston, IL	L 10–16	2,102	
November 3	Western Kentucky*		O'Brien Stadium; Charleston, IL	W 28–6	9,008	
November 10	at Southwest Missouri State		Briggs Stadium; Springfield, MO	L 6–48		
*Non-conference game; Rankings from NCAA Division I-AA Football Committee Poll released prior to the game
