= 1990 Nevada Wolf Pack football team =

American college football season

1990 Nevada Wolf Pack football

Big Sky champion

NCAA Division I-AA Championship, L 13–36 vs. Georgia Southern
- Conference: Big Sky Conference

Ranking
- AP: No. 4
- Record: 13–2 (7–1 Big Sky)
- Head coach: Chris Ault (15th season)
- Home stadium: Mackay Stadium

1990 Big Sky Conference football standings
	Conf.					Overall
Team	W		L		T	W		L		T
No. 4 Nevada $^	7	–	1	–	0	13	–	2	–	0
No. 10 Boise State ^	6	–	2	–	0	10	–	4	–	0
No. 13 Idaho ^	6	–	2	–	0	9	–	4	–	0
Montana	4	–	4	–	0	7	–	4	–	0
Northern Arizona	3	–	5	–	0	5	–	6	–	0
Weber State	3	–	5	–	0	5	–	6	–	0
Eastern Washington	3	–	5	–	0	5	–	6	–	0
Montana State	3	–	5	–	0	4	–	7	–	0
Idaho State	1	–	7	–	0	3	–	8	–	0
$ – Conference champion; ^ – NCAA Division I-AA playoff participant; Rankings from NCAA Division I-AA Poll

The 1990 Nevada Wolf Pack football team was an American football team that represented the University of Nevada, Reno in the Big Sky Conference (BSC) during the 1990 NCAA Division I-AA football season. In their 15th season under head coach Chris Ault, the Wolf Pack compiled a 13–2 record (7–1 against conference opponents), won the BSC championship, and lost to Georgia Southern in the NCAA Division I-AA Football Championship Game. They played their home games at Mackay Stadium.

== Schedule ==
Date	Opponent	Rank	Site	TV	Result	Attendance	Source
September 8	Northern Arizona	No. 19	Mackay Stadium; Reno, NV		W 55–14	14,210	
September 15	Sacramento State*	No. 19	Mackay Stadium; Reno, NV		W 41–7	15,080	
September 22	at Montana State	No. 13	Reno H. Sales Stadium; Bozeman, MT		W 20–14	12,087	
September 29	Idaho	No. 10	Mackay Stadium; Reno, NV		W 31–28 ^{OT}	16,125	
October 6	at Idaho State	No. 5	Holt Arena; Pocatello, ID		W 17–10	6,058	
October 13	No. 19 Eastern Washington^{†}	No. 4	Mackay Stadium; Reno, NV		W 40–17	18,085	
October 20	at UNLV*	No. 3	Sam Boyd Silver Bowl; East Las Vegas, NV (Fremont Cannon)		W 26–14	22,402	
October 27	at Weber State	No. 3	Wildcat Stadium; Ogden, UT		W 28–7	6,895	
November 3	No. 14 Montana	No. 3	Mackay Stadium; Reno, NV		W 34–27	19,530	
November 10	at No. 6 Boise State	No. 2	Bronco Stadium; Boise, ID (rivalry)		L 14–30	22,611	
November 17	Western Illinois*	No. 7	Mackay Stadium; Reno, NV		W 50–16	16,310	
November 24	No. 14 Northeast Louisiana*	No. 4	Mackay Stadium; Reno, NV (NCAA Division I-AA First Round)		W 27–14	11,008	
December 1	No. 12 Furman*	No. 4	Mackay Stadium; Reno, NV (NCAA Division I-AA Quarterfinal)		W 42–35 ^{3OT}	11,519	
December 8	No. 10 Boise State*	No. 4	Mackay Stadium; Reno, NV (NCAA Division I-AA Semifinal)		W 59–52 ^{3OT}	19,776	
December 15	at No. 3 Georgia Southern*	No. 4	Paulson Stadium; Statesboro, GA (NCAA Division I-AA Championship Game)	CBS	L 13–36	23,204	
*Non-conference game; ^{†}Homecoming; Rankings from NCAA Division I-AA Football Committee Poll released prior to the game
