= 1990 Jackson State Tigers football team =

American college football season

1990 Jackson State Tigers football

SWAC champion

NCAA Division I-AA First Round, L 7–28 vs. Middle Tennessee
- Conference: Southwestern Athletic Conference
- Record: 8–4 (5–1 SWAC)
- Head coach: W. C. Gorden (15th season)
- Home stadium: Mississippi Veterans Memorial Stadium

1990 Southwestern Athletic Conference football standings
	Conf.					Overall
Team	W		L		T	W		L		T
No. 16 Jackson State $^	5	–	1	–	0	8	–	4	–	0
Alabama State	4	–	2	–	0	8	–	2	–	1
Grambling State	3	–	3	–	0	8	–	3	–	0
Mississippi Valley State	3	–	3	–	0	5	–	6	–	0
Southern	2	–	4	–	0	4	–	7	–	0
Texas Southern	2	–	4	–	0	4	–	7	–	0
Alcorn State	2	–	4	–	0	2	–	7	–	0
$ – Conference champion; ^ – NCAA Division I-AA playoff participant; Rankings from NCAA Division I-AA Football Committee poll

The 1990 Jackson State Tigers football team represented Jackson State University as a member of the Southwestern Athletic Conference (SWAC) during the 1990 NCAA Division I-AA football season. Led by 15th-year head coach W. C. Gorden, the Tigers compiled an overall record of 8–4 and a mark of 5–1 in conference play, and finished as SWAC champion. Jackson State finished their season with a loss against Middle Tennessee in the Division I-AA playoffs.

== Schedule ==
Date	Opponent	Rank	Site	Result	Attendance	Source
September 1	Delaware State*		Mississippi Veterans Memorial Stadium; Jackson, MS	W 31–7		
September 8	vs. Tennessee State*		Liberty Bowl Memorial Stadium; Memphis, TN (rivalry)	L 14–23	39,579	
September 15	Miles*		Mississippi Veterans Memorial Stadium; Jackson, MS	W 52–0		
September 22	Mississippi Valley State		Mississippi Veterans Memorial Stadium; Jackson, MS	W 57–34		
September 29	at Stephen F. Austin*		Homer Bryce Stadium; Nacogdoches, TX	W 39–30	14,186	
October 6	at Alabama State	No. T–14	Cramton Bowl; Montgomery, AL	L 28–42		
October 13	at Southern		A. W. Mumford Stadium; Baton Rouge, LA (rivalry)	W 52–14		
October 20	at No. 12 Grambling State	No. 16	Eddie G. Robinson Memorial Stadium; Grambling, LA	W 29–19	14,496	
November 3	Texas Southern	No. 12	Mississippi Veterans Memorial Stadium; Jackson, MS	W 54–14		
November 10	Northwestern State*	No. 11	Mississippi Veterans Memorial Stadium; Jackson, MS	L 24–31	15,000	
November 17	Alcorn State	No. 16	Mississippi Veterans Memorial Stadium; Jackson, MS (Soul Bowl)	W 38–20	35,906	
November 24	at No. 1 Middle Tennessee*	No. 16	Johnny "Red" Floyd Stadium; Murfreesboro, TN (NCAA Division I-AA First Round)	L 7–28		
*Non-conference game; Rankings from NCAA Division I-AA Football Committee Poll released prior to the game
