= 1990 McNeese State Cowboys football team =

American college football season

1990 McNeese State Cowboys football
- Conference: Southland Conference
- Record: 5–6 (4–2 Southland)
- Head coach: Bobby Keasler (1st season)
- Offensive coordinator: Mike Santiago (1st season)
- Defensive coordinator: Kirby Bruchhaus (1st season)
- Home stadium: Cowboy Stadium

1990 Southland Conference football standings
	Conf.					Overall
Team	W		L		T	W		L		T
No. 14 Northeast Louisiana $^	5	–	1	–	0	7	–	5	–	0
McNeese State	4	–	2	–	0	5	–	6	–	0
Southwest Texas State	3	–	3	–	0	6	–	5	–	0
Northwestern State	3	–	3	–	0	5	–	6	–	0
Sam Houston State	3	–	3	–	0	4	–	7	–	0
North Texas	2	–	4	–	0	6	–	5	–	0
Stephen F. Austin	1	–	5	–	0	1	–	10	–	0
$ – Conference champion; ^ – NCAA Division I-AA playoff participant; Rankings from NCAA Division I-AA Football Committee poll

The 1990 McNeese State Cowboys football team was an American football team that represented McNeese State University as a member of the Southland Conference (Southland) during the 1990 NCAA Division I-AA football season. In their first year under head coach Bobby Keasler, the team compiled an overall record of 5–6, with a mark of 4–2 in conference play, and finished second in the Southland.

== Schedule ==
Date	Opponent	Rank	Site	Result	Attendance	Source
September 1	at Nicholls State*		John L. Guidry Stadium; Thibodaux, LA	L 24–31		
September 8	Louisiana Tech*		Cowboy Stadium; Lake Charles, LA	L 3–51	17,178	
September 15	at No. T–17 Eastern Illinois*		O'Brien Stadium; Charleston, IL	W 15–7	6,408	
September 22	at No. 3 Montana*		Washington–Grizzly Stadium; Missoula, MT	L 22–45	11,087	
October 6	Northeast Louisiana		Cowboy Stadium; Lake Charles, LA	W 19–14		
October 13	Northwestern State		Cowboy Stadium; Lake Charles, LA (rivalry)	W 38–21		
October 20	at No. 13 North Texas		Fouts Field; Denton, TX	W 16–14	17,625	
October 27	at No. 15 Southwest Texas State	No. 19	Bobcat Stadium; San Marcos, TX	L 17–19		
November 3	at Stephen F. Austin		Homer Bryce Stadium; Nacogdoches, TX	L 9–30	11,387	
November 10	Sam Houston State		Cowboy Stadium; Lake Charles, LA	W 13–6		
November 17	Weber State*		Cowboy Stadium; Lake Charles, LA	L 7–27		
*Non-conference game; Rankings from NCAA Division I-AA Football Committee Poll released prior to the game
