= 1990 North Texas Mean Green football team =

American college football season

1990 North Texas Mean Green football
- Conference: Southland Conference
- Record: 6–5 (2–4 Southland)
- Head coach: Corky Nelson (9th season)
- Home stadium: Fouts Field

1990 Southland Conference football standings
	Conf.					Overall
Team	W		L		T	W		L		T
No. 14 Northeast Louisiana $^	5	–	1	–	0	7	–	5	–	0
McNeese State	4	–	2	–	0	5	–	6	–	0
Southwest Texas State	3	–	3	–	0	6	–	5	–	0
Northwestern State	3	–	3	–	0	5	–	6	–	0
Sam Houston State	3	–	3	–	0	4	–	7	–	0
North Texas	2	–	4	–	0	6	–	5	–	0
Stephen F. Austin	1	–	5	–	0	1	–	10	–	0
$ – Conference champion; ^ – NCAA Division I-AA playoff participant; Rankings from NCAA Division I-AA Football Committee poll

The 1990 North Texas Mean Green football team was an American football team that represented the University of North Texas during the 1990 NCAA Division I-AA football season as a member of the Southland Conference. In their ninth year under head coach Corky Nelson, the team compiled a 6–5 record.

== Schedule ==
Date	Opponent	Rank	Site	Result	Attendance	Source
September 8	Alcorn State*	No. 18т	Fouts Field; Denton, TX	W 20–7	14,125	
September 15	Abilene Christian*	No. 18т	Fouts Field; Denton, TX	W 38–6	14,450	
September 22	at No. 12 (I-A) Texas A&M*	No. 7	Kyle Field; College Station, TX	L 8–40	52,049	
September 29	Northwestern State	No. 13	Fouts Field; Denton, TX	L 18–28	13,825	
October 6	SMU*		Fouts Field; Denton, TX (rivalry)	W 14–7	22,750	
October 13	at Stephen F. Austin	No. 15	Homer Bryce Stadium; Nacogdoches, TX	W 31–24	8,261	
October 20	McNeese State^{†}	No. 13	Fouts Field; Denton, TX	L 14–16	17,625	
October 27	at Sam Houston State		Bowers Stadium; Huntsville, TX	L 14–26	8,126	
November 3	Arkansas State*		Fouts Field; Denton, TX	W 35–26	5,925	
November 10	at No. 13 Southwest Texas State		Bobcat Stadium; San Marcos, TX	W 16–15	8,714	
November 17	No. 15 Northeast Louisiana	No. 19	Fouts Field; Denton, TX	L 15–16	6,875	
*Non-conference game; ^{†}Homecoming; Rankings from NCAA Division I-AA Football Committee Poll released prior to the game
