= 1990 Northwestern State Demons football team =

American college football season

1990 Northwestern State Demons football
- Conference: Southland Conference
- Record: 5–6 (3–3 Southland)
- Head coach: Sam Goodwin (8th season)
- Home stadium: Harry Turpin Stadium

1990 Southland Conference football standings
	Conf.					Overall
Team	W		L		T	W		L		T
No. 14 Northeast Louisiana $^	5	–	1	–	0	7	–	5	–	0
McNeese State	4	–	2	–	0	5	–	6	–	0
Southwest Texas State	3	–	3	–	0	6	–	5	–	0
Northwestern State	3	–	3	–	0	5	–	6	–	0
Sam Houston State	3	–	3	–	0	4	–	7	–	0
North Texas	2	–	4	–	0	6	–	5	–	0
Stephen F. Austin	1	–	5	–	0	1	–	10	–	0
$ – Conference champion; ^ – NCAA Division I-AA playoff participant; Rankings from NCAA Division I-AA Football Committee poll

The 1990 Northwestern State Demons football team was an American football team that represented Northwestern State University as a member of the Southland Conference during the 1990 NCAA Division I-AA football season. In their eighth year under head coach Sam Goodwin, the team compiled an overall record of 5–6, with a mark of 3–3 in conference play, and finished tied for third in the Southland.

== Schedule ==
Date	Opponent	Site	Result	Attendance	Source
September 8	No. T–17 Eastern Illinois*	Harry Turpin Stadium; Natchitoches, LA	L 22–23		
September 15	Nicholls State*	Harry Turpin Stadium; Natchitoches, LA (rivalry)	L 7–19		
September 22	East Texas State*	Harry Turpin Stadium; Natchitoches, LA	W 24–17	10,400	
September 29	at No. 13 North Texas	Fouts Field; Denton, TX	W 28–18	13,825	
October 6	at Arkansas State*	Indian Stadium; Jonesboro, AR	L 8–16	16,839	
October 13	at McNeese State	Cowboy Stadium; Lake Charles, LA (rivalry)	L 21–38		
October 20	No. 19 Southwest Texas State	Harry Turpin Stadium; Natchitoches, LA	L 12–21	8,800	
October 27	at Northeast Louisiana	Malone Stadium; Monroe, LA (rivalry)	L 3–14	15,718	
November 3	Sam Houston State	Harry Turpin Stadium; Natchitoches, LA	W 27–10	4,600	
November 10	at No. 11 Jackson State*	Mississippi Veterans Memorial Stadium; Jackson, MS	W 31–24	15,000	
November 17	at Stephen F. Austin	Homer Bryce Stadium; Nacogdoches, TX (rivalry)	W 20–3		
*Non-conference game; Rankings from NCAA Division I-AA Football Committee Poll released prior to the game
