= 1990 Northern Iowa Panthers football team =

American college football season

1990 Northern Iowa Panthers football

GFC co-champion

NCAA Division I-AA First Round, L 3–30 at Boise State
- Conference: Gateway Football Conference
- Record: 8–4 (5–1 GFC)
- Head coach: Terry Allen (2nd season)
- Defensive coordinator: Ardell Wiegandt (2nd season)
- Home stadium: UNI-Dome

1990 Gateway Collegiate Athletic Conference football standings
	Conf.					Overall
Team	W		L		T	W		L		T
No. 6 Southwest Missouri State +^	5	–	1	–	0	9	–	3	–	0
No. 11 Northern Iowa +^	5	–	1	–	0	8	–	4	–	0
Eastern Illinois	3	–	3	–	0	5	–	6	–	0
Illinois State	3	–	3	–	0	5	–	6	–	0
Western Illinois	3	–	3	–	0	3	–	8	–	0
Indiana State	1	–	5	–	0	4	–	7	–	0
Southern Illinois	1	–	5	–	0	2	–	9	–	0
+ – Conference co-champions; ^ – NCAA Division I-AA playoff participant; Rankings from NCAA Division I-AA Football Committee poll

The 1990 Northern Iowa Panthers football team was an American football team that represented the University of Northern Iowa as a member of the Gateway Football Conference (Gateway Conference) during the 1990 NCAA Division I-AA football season. In its second season under head coach Terry Allen, the team compiled an 8–4 record (5–1 in conference games) and tied for the Gateway Conference championship. Northern Iowa advanced to the NCAA Division I-AA playoffs and was defeated by Boise State in the first round.

Placekicker Brian Mitchell converted 21 consecutive field goals in 1990, converted 27 of 28 field goal attempts and 31 of 31 extra points for the full season, scored 112 points, and received first-team honors on the 1990 Kodak Division I-AA All-America team. Four Northern Iowa players were honored as first-team players on the 1990 all-Gateway football team: Mitchell; center Mike Fontana; linebacker James Jones; and defensive back Willie Beamon. Seven others were named to the second team. Beamon tallied 19 pass breakups and 8 interceptions in 1990. William Freeney tallied 14 sacks. Quarterback Jay Johnson tallied 2,929 passing yards (244.1 per game).

The team played its home games at the UNI-Dome in Cedar Falls, Iowa.

== Schedule ==
Date	Time	Opponent	Rank	Site	Result	Attendance	Source
September 1	1:30 p.m.	Southern Illinois		UNI-Dome; Cedar Falls, IA	W 30–9	10,103	
September 8	1:00 p.m.	at Iowa State*		Cyclone Stadium; Ames, IA	L 6–35	45,647	
September 15	6:30 p.m.	at Oklahoma State*		Lewis Field; Stillwater, OK	L 23–33	36,300	
September 22	7:05 p.m.	Idaho State*		Holt Arena; Pocatello, ID	W 44–10	6,016	
October 6	1:30 p.m.	Illinois State^{†}	No. 17	UNI-Dome; Cedar Falls, IA	W 31–0	14,689	
October 13	7:00 p.m.	Western Illinois	No. 13	UNI-Dome; Cedar Falls, IA	W 50–14	10,794	
October 20	1:30 p.m.	at Indiana State	No. 10	Memorial Stadium; Terre Haute, IN	L 23–33	7,851	
October 27	1:30 p.m.	at Eastern Illinois	No. 17	O'Brien Stadium; Charleston, IL	W 16–10	2,102	
November 3	7:00 p.m.	No. 2 Southwest Missouri State	No. 17	UNI-Dome; Cedar Falls, IA	W 20–17	16,324	
November 10	7:00 p.m.	Clarion*	No. 14	UNI-Dome; Cedar Falls, IA	W 52–12	8,708	
November 17	7:00 p.m.	Northern Arizona*	No. 12	UNI-Dome; Cedar Falls, IA	W 36–16	8,517	
November 24	1:30 p.m.	at No. 10 Boise State*	No. 11	Bronco Stadium; Boise, ID (NCAA Division I-AA First Round)	L 3–20	11,691	
*Non-conference game; ^{†}Homecoming; Rankings from NCAA Division I-AA Football Committee Poll released prior to the game; All times are in Central time

== Roster ==
1990 Northern Iowa Panthers football team roster
Players
Coaches
Offense

Pos.	#	Name	Class
QB	13	Kurt Warner	Fr

Defense

Pos.	#	Name	Class
CB	12	Willie Beamon	So
DE	96	James Jones	Sr
DB	9	Chris Klieman	Sr

Special teams

Pos.	#	Name	Class

Head coach

- Terry Allen

Coordinators/assistant coaches

Legend

- (C) Team captain
- (S) Suspended
- (I) Ineligible
- Injured
- Redshirt
