= 1990 Southwest Texas State Bobcats football team =

American college football season

1990 Southwest Texas State Bobcats football
- Conference: Southland Conference
- Record: 6–5 (3–3 SLC)
- Head coach: Dennis Franchione (1st season)
- Home stadium: Bobcat Stadium

1990 Southland Conference football standings
	Conf.					Overall
Team	W		L		T	W		L		T
No. 14 Northeast Louisiana $^	5	–	1	–	0	7	–	5	–	0
McNeese State	4	–	2	–	0	5	–	6	–	0
Southwest Texas State	3	–	3	–	0	6	–	5	–	0
Northwestern State	3	–	3	–	0	5	–	6	–	0
Sam Houston State	3	–	3	–	0	4	–	7	–	0
North Texas	2	–	4	–	0	6	–	5	–	0
Stephen F. Austin	1	–	5	–	0	1	–	10	–	0
$ – Conference champion; ^ – NCAA Division I-AA playoff participant; Rankings from NCAA Division I-AA Football Committee poll

The 1990 Southwest Texas State Bobcats football team was an American football team that represented Southwest Texas State University (now known as Texas State University) during the 1990 NCAA Division I-AA football season as a member of the Southland Conference (SLC). In their first year under head coach Dennis Franchione, the team compiled an overall record of 6–5 with a mark of 3–3 in conference play.

== Schedule ==
Date	Opponent	Rank	Site	Result	Attendance	Source
September 1	at Texas A&I*		Javelina Stadium; Kingsville, TX	W 15–7		
September 8	Idaho*		Bobcat Stadium; San Marcos, TX	L 35–38	9,431	
September 15	at Liberty*		Willard May Stadium; Lynchburg, VA	L 22–35	7,540	
September 22	at No. 18 Northeast Louisiana		Malone Stadium; Monroe, LA	L 27–30	15,128	
September 29	Nicholls State*		Bobcat Stadium; San Marcos, TX (rivalry)	W 33–30		
October 6	Stephen F. Austin		Bobcat Stadium; San Marcos, TX	W 24–0		
October 13	vs. Texas Southern*		Alamo Stadium; San Antonio, TX	W 32–9		
October 20	at Northwestern State	No. 19	Harry Turpin Stadium; Natchitoches, LA	W 21–12	8,800	
October 27	No. 19 McNeese State	No. 15	Bobcat Stadium; San Marcos, TX	W 19–17		
November 10	North Texas	No. 13	Bobcat Stadium; San Marcos, TX	L 15–16	8,714	
November 17	at Sam Houston State	No. 20	Bowers Stadium; Huntsville, TX (rivalry)	L 25–26		
*Non-conference game; Rankings from NCAA Division I-AA Football Committee Poll released prior to the game
