= 1990 Texas Southern Tigers football team =

American college football season

1990 Texas Southern Tigers football
- Conference: Southwestern Athletic Conference
- Record: 5–6 (2–4 SWAC)
- Head coach: Wally Highsmith (2nd season)
- Home stadium: Robertson Stadium; Rice Stadium

1990 Southwestern Athletic Conference football standings
	Conf.					Overall
Team	W		L		T	W		L		T
No. 16 Jackson State $^	5	–	1	–	0	8	–	4	–	0
Alabama State	4	–	2	–	0	8	–	2	–	1
Grambling State	3	–	3	–	0	8	–	3	–	0
Mississippi Valley State	3	–	3	–	0	5	–	6	–	0
Southern	2	–	4	–	0	4	–	7	–	0
Texas Southern	2	–	4	–	0	4	–	7	–	0
Alcorn State	2	–	4	–	0	2	–	7	–	0
$ – Conference champion; ^ – NCAA Division I-AA playoff participant; Rankings from NCAA Division I-AA Football Committee poll

The 1990 Texas Southern Tigers football team represented Texas Southern University as a member of the Southwestern Athletic Conference (SWAC) during the 1990 NCAA Division I-AA football season. Led by second-year head coach Wally Highsmith, the Tigers compiled an overall record of 5–6, with a mark of 2–4 in conference play, and finished tied for fifth in the SWAC.

== Schedule ==
Date	Opponent	Site	Result	Attendance	Source
September 1	Hampton*	Robertson Stadium; Houston, TX	W 28–16		
September 8	vs. Sam Houston State*	Public Schools Stadium; Galveston, TX (Galveston Beach Kickoff Classic)	W 20–15	8,000	
September 15	Southern	Rice Stadium; Houston, TX	W 26–16		
September 22	at Alabama State	Cramton Bowl; Montgomery, AL	W 24–23		
September 29	at Arkansas–Pine Bluff*	Pumphrey Stadium; Pine Bluff, AR	W 13–37 (forfeit win)		
October 6	at Alcorn State	Henderson Stadium; Lorman, MS	L 26–31		
October 13	vs. Southwest Texas State*	Alamo Stadium; San Antonio, TX	L 9–32		
October 20	Mississippi Valley State	Robertson Stadium; Houston, TX	L 21–24		
October 27	Grambling State	Rice Stadium; Houston, TX	L 36–52	20,000	
November 3	at Jackson State	Mississippi Veterans Memorial Stadium; Jackson, MS	L 14–54		
November 17	at No. 18 UCF*	Florida Citrus Bowl; Orlando, FL	L 6–63	16,328	
*Non-conference game; Rankings from NCAA Division I-AA Football Committee Poll released prior to the game
