= 1990 North Carolina A&T Aggies football team =

American college football season

1990 North Carolina A&T Aggies football

Black college football national co-champion
- Conference: Mid-Eastern Athletic Conference
- Record: 9–2 (5–1 MEAC)
- Head coach: Bill Hayes (2nd season)
- Home stadium: Aggie Stadium

1990 Mid-Eastern Athletic Conference football standings
	Conf.					Overall
Team	W		L		T	W		L		T
Florida A&M $	6	–	0	–	0	7	–	4	–	0
No. T–19 North Carolina A&T	5	–	1	–	0	9	–	2	–	0
Delaware State	4	–	2	–	0	7	–	3	–	0
Howard	3	–	3	–	0	6	–	5	–	0
South Carolina State	2	–	4	–	0	4	–	6	–	0
Bethune–Cookman	1	–	5	–	0	4	–	7	–	0
Morgan State	0	–	6	–	0	1	–	10	–	0
$ – Conference champion; Rankings from NCAA Division I-AA Football Committee poll

The 1990 North Carolina A&T Aggies football team represented North Carolina A&T State University as a member of the Mid-Eastern Athletic Conference (MEAC) during the 1990 NCAA Division I-AA football season. Led by second-year head coach Bill Hayes, the Aggies compiled an overall record of 9–2 with a mark of 6–1 in conference play, placing second in the MEAC. The team's performance earned them the program's second black college football national championship, sharing the title with the Central State Marauders. North Carolina A&T played home games at Aggie Stadium in Greensboro, North Carolina.

== Schedule ==
Date	Opponent	Rank	Site	Result	Attendance	Source
September 1	vs. North Carolina Central*		American Legion Memorial Stadium; Charlotte, NC (rivalry)	W 21–6	14,000	
September 8	Winston–Salem State*		Aggie Stadium; Greensboro, NC (rivalry)	W 27–16		
September 15	Western Carolina*		Aggie Stadium; Greensboro, NC	W 40–19		
September 22	Morgan State		Aggie Stadium; Greensboro, NC	W 49–0	12,329	
September 29	at Norfolk State*		Foreman Field; Norfolk, VA	W 20–6		
October 6	at Florida A&M		Bragg Memorial Stadium; Tallahassee, FL	L 15–17	11,379	
October 20	at Howard		Robert F. Kennedy Memorial Stadium; Washington, DC	W 33–12	35,123	
October 27	Bethune–Cookman	No. T–20	Aggie Stadium; Greensboro, NC	W 27–20	22,000	
November 3	at Delaware State	No. 18	Alumni Stadium; Dover, DE	W 48–28		
November 10	at Liberty	No. 16	Willard May Stadium; Lynchburg, VA	L 24–45		
November 17	South Carolina State		Aggie Stadium; Greensboro, NC (rivalry)	W 7–6		
*Non-conference game; Rankings from NCAA Division I-AA Football Committee Poll released prior to the game
