= 1990 Idaho Vandals football team =

American college football season

1990 Idaho Vandals football

NCAA Division I-AA Quarterfinal, L 27–28 at Georgia Southern
- Conference: Big Sky Conference
- Record: 9–4 (6–2 Big Sky)
- Head coach: John L. Smith (2nd season)
- Offensive coordinator: Bobby Petrino (1st season)
- Defensive coordinator: Craig Bray (1st season)
- Home stadium: Kibbie Dome

1990 Big Sky Conference football standings
	Conf.					Overall
Team	W		L		T	W		L		T
No. 4 Nevada $^	7	–	1	–	0	13	–	2	–	0
No. 10 Boise State ^	6	–	2	–	0	10	–	4	–	0
No. 13 Idaho ^	6	–	2	–	0	9	–	4	–	0
Montana	4	–	4	–	0	7	–	4	–	0
Northern Arizona	3	–	5	–	0	5	–	6	–	0
Weber State	3	–	5	–	0	5	–	6	–	0
Eastern Washington	3	–	5	–	0	5	–	6	–	0
Montana State	3	–	5	–	0	4	–	7	–	0
Idaho State	1	–	7	–	0	3	–	8	–	0
$ – Conference champion; ^ – NCAA Division I-AA playoff participant; Rankings from NCAA Division I-AA Poll

The 1990 Idaho Vandals football team represented the University of Idaho in the 1990 NCAA Division I-AA football season. The Vandals were led by second-year head coach John L. Smith, were members of the Big Sky Conference and played their home games at the Kibbie Dome, an indoor facility on campus in Moscow, Idaho.

The three-time defending conference champion Vandals made the I-AA playoffs for the sixth consecutive season, under a third head coach. With future college hall of fame quarterback John Friesz in the NFL, Idaho was led by redshirt freshman Doug Nussmeier; they finished the regular season at 8–3 and 6–2 in the Big Sky. Nussmeier's season was ended by a broken right ankle in early October, and fifth-year senior Steve Nolan guided the team to seven consecutive wins, including a ninth-straight victory over rival Boise State.

The season ended in the quarterfinals in December, where Idaho lost by one point at Georgia Southern, the eventual national champion.

== Schedule ==
Date	Time	Opponent	Rank	Site	Result	Attendance	Source
September 1	1:00 p.m.	Montana State		Kibbie Dome; Moscow, ID	L 24–27	9,800	
September 8	5:00 p.m.	at Southwest Texas State*		Bobcat Stadium; San Marcos, TX	W 38–35	9,431	
September 15	1:00 p.m.	at Oregon*		Autzen Stadium; Eugene, OR	L 23–55	29,637	
September 22	1:00 p.m.	Weber State		Kibbie Dome; Moscow, ID	W 37–27	8,100	
September 29	1:00 p.m.	at No. 10 Nevada		Mackay Stadium; Reno, NV	L 28–31 ^{OT}	16,125	
October 6	1:00 p.m.	Chico State*		Kibbie Dome; Moscow, ID	W 59–21	7,600	
October 13	2:00 p.m.	Idaho State^{†}		Kibbie Dome; Moscow, ID (rivalry)	W 41–20	14,100	
October 20	1:00 p.m.	at Eastern Washington		Joe Albi Stadium; Spokane, WA	W 51–28	7,500	
November 3	1:00 p.m.	Northern Arizona		Kibbie Dome; Moscow, ID	W 52–7	10,100	
November 10	11:00 a.m.	at No. 19 Montana	No. 17	Washington–Grizzly Stadium; Missoula, MT (Little Brown Stein)	W 35–14	10,720	
November 17	12:00 p.m.	at No. 5 Boise State	No. 14	Bronco Stadium; Boise, ID (rivalry)	W 21–14	23,273	
November 24	11:00 a.m.	at No. 6 Southwest Missouri State*	No. 13	Briggs Stadium; Springfield, MO (NCAA Division I-AA First Round)	W 41–35	8,750	
December 1	9:30 a.m.	at No. 3 Georgia Southern*	No. 13	Paulson Stadium; Statesboro, GA (NCAA Division I-AA Quarterfinal)	L 27–28	11,571	
*Non-conference game; ^{†}Homecoming; Rankings from NCAA Division I-AA Football Committee Poll released prior to the game; All times are in Pacific time

== Roster ==
1990 Idaho Vandals football team roster
Players
Coaches
Offense

Pos.	#	Name	Class
WR		Yo Murphy	So
QB		Steve Nolan	Sr
QB	13	Doug Nussmeier	Fr
RB		Roman Carter
RB	26	Devon Pearce	Jr
WR	30	Kasey Dunn	Jr
C	50	Mike Rice	Sr
G	54	Floyd Dorry	So
G	66	Chris Hoff	Sr
OT		Jody Schnug	Fr
OT		Chuck Yarbro	Sr
OT		Eric Wiker	Jr
TE	84	Scott Dahlquist	Sr

Defense

Pos.	#	Name	Class
FS	22	Kris McCall	Jr
CB	23	Charlie Oliver	Sr
SS	33	Terry Green	Jr
CB	35	Jeff Jordan	So
CB		Noah Ramsey
DB		Josh Moore
LB	39	Jimmy Jacobs	Sr
LB	43	Roger Cecil	Sr
LB		Mark Matthews	Sr
LB		Robert Munk	Jr
LB		Will Saffo	So
DT	59	John Sirmon	So
DE	87	Jeff Robinson	So
DE		Gerry Keating	Sr
DE		Billy Sims	So
DT	97	Brian Cockrell	So

Special teams

Pos.	#	Name	Class
K	14	Thane Doyle	Jr
P		Joe Carrasco	Sr

Head coach

- John L. Smith (2nd year)

Coordinators/assistant coaches

- Bobby Petrino (OC)
- Craig Bray (DC)
- Mike Cox (LB)

Legend

- (C) Team captain
- (S) Suspended
- (I) Ineligible
- Injured
- Redshirt

== All-conference ==
Four Vandals made the all-conference team: running back Devon Pearce, wide receiver Kasey Dunn, cornerback Charlie Oliver, and defensive end Jeff Robinson. Second team selections were guard Chris Hoff, tight end Scott Dahlquist, linebacker Jimmy Jacobs, and punter Joe Carrasco. Honorable mention were quarterback Steve Nolan, center Mike Rice, return specialist Roman Carter, and linebacker Mark Matthews.

Pearce shared the Big Sky's outstanding offensive player award with quarterback Jamie Martin of Weber State.
