= 1990 Boise State Broncos football team =

American college football season

1990 Boise State Broncos football

NCAA Division I-AA Semifinal, L 52–59^{3OT} at Nevada
- Conference: Big Sky Conference
- Record: 10–4 (6–2 Big Sky)
- Head coach: Skip Hall (4th season)
- Defensive coordinator: Jim Fleming (1st season)
- Home stadium: Bronco Stadium

1990 Big Sky Conference football standings
	Conf.					Overall
Team	W		L		T	W		L		T
No. 4 Nevada $^	7	–	1	–	0	13	–	2	–	0
No. 10 Boise State ^	6	–	2	–	0	10	–	4	–	0
No. 13 Idaho ^	6	–	2	–	0	9	–	4	–	0
Montana	4	–	4	–	0	7	–	4	–	0
Northern Arizona	3	–	5	–	0	5	–	6	–	0
Weber State	3	–	5	–	0	5	–	6	–	0
Eastern Washington	3	–	5	–	0	5	–	6	–	0
Montana State	3	–	5	–	0	4	–	7	–	0
Idaho State	1	–	7	–	0	3	–	8	–	0
$ – Conference champion; ^ – NCAA Division I-AA playoff participant; Rankings from NCAA Division I-AA Poll

The 1990 Boise State Broncos football team represented Boise State University in the 1990 NCAA Division I-AA football season. The Broncos competed in the Big Sky Conference and played their home games on campus at Bronco Stadium in Boise, Idaho. Led by fourth-year head coach Skip Hall, they finished the regular season at 8–3 (6–2 in Big Sky, second).

The Broncos returned to the Division I-AA playoffs and advanced to the semifinals, but fell to conference rival Nevada in triple overtime to finish at 10–4. Three Big Sky teams were selected for the 16-team postseason and all won their openers: Idaho fell in the quarters, BSU in the semis and Nevada in the final.

== Schedule ==
Date	Time	Opponent	Rank	Site	Result	Attendance	Source
September 1		Stephen F. Austin*	No. 12	Bronco Stadium; Boise, ID	W 14–10	19,312	
September 8		Weber State	No. 12	Bronco Stadium; Boise, ID	W 24–14	19,521	
September 15	2:00 p.m.	at Eastern Washington	No. 12	Woodward Field; Cheney, WA	L 10–16	4,200	
September 22		Boston University*	No. 17	Bronco Stadium; Boise, ID	W 34–21	19,875	
September 29		at Long Beach State*	No. 14	Veterans Memorial Stadium; Long Beach, CA	L 20–21	4,106	
October 6		No. 8 Montana	No. 19	Bronco Stadium; Boise, ID	W 41–3	22,149	
October 13		at Northern Arizona	No. 10	Walkup Skydome; Flagstaff, AZ	W 28–20	8,614	
October 27		at Idaho State	No. 9	Holt Arena; Pocatello, ID	W 44–16	8,166	
November 3		at Montana State	No. 8	Reno H. Sales Stadium; Bozeman, MT	W 31–27	7,477	
November 10		No. 2 Nevada	No. 6	Bronco Stadium; Boise, ID (rivalry)	W 30–14	22,611	
November 17	1:00 p.m.	No. 14 Idaho	No. 5	Bronco Stadium; Boise, ID (rivalry)	L 14–21	23,273	
November 24	12:30 p.m.	No. 11 Northern Iowa*	No. 10	Bronco Stadium; Boise, ID (NCAA Division I-AA First Round)	W 20–3	11,691	
December 1		No. 1 Middle Tennessee*	No. 10	Bronco Stadium; Boise, ID (NCAA Division I-AA Quarterfinal)	W 20–13	15,849	
December 8		at No. 4 Nevada	No. 10	Mackay Stadium; Reno, NV (NCAA Division I-AA Semifinal)	L 52–59 ^{3OT}	19,776	
*Non-conference game; Rankings from NCAA Division I-AA Football Committee Poll released prior to the game; All times are in Mountain time
