= 1990 NCAA Division I-AA football season =

American college football season

1990 NCAA Division I-AA season

Regular season
- Number of teams: 87
- Duration: August–November
- Payton Award: Walter Dean (RB, Grambling State)

Playoff
- Duration: November 25–December 15
- Championship date: December 15, 1990
- Championship site: Paulson Stadium; Statesboro, Georgia
- Champion: Georgia Southern

NCAA Division I-AA football seasons
- «1989 1991»

The 1990 NCAA Division I-AA football season, part of college football in the United States organized by the National Collegiate Athletic Association at the Division I-AA level, began in August 1990, and concluded with the 1990 NCAA Division I-AA Football Championship Game on December 15, 1990, at Paulson Stadium in Statesboro, Georgia. The Georgia Southern Eagles won their fourth I-AA championship, defeating the Nevada Wolf Pack by a score of 36–13.

== Conference changes and new programs ==
- The Colonial League adopted its present-day Patriot League name, and began to sponsor sports other than football.

| School | 1989 Conference | 1990 Conference |
|---|---|---|
| Central Florida | D-II Independent | I-AA Independent |
| Fordham | I-AA Independent | Patriot |
| Lamar | I-AA Independent | Dropped Program |
| Prairie View A&M | SWAC | Dropped Program |

== Conference standings ==
1990 Big Sky Conference football standings
| | Conf. | | | | | Overall |
| Team | W | | L | | T | W | | L | | T |
|---|---|---|---|---|---|---|---|---|---|---|
| No. 4 Nevada $^ | 7 | – | 1 | – | 0 | 13 | – | 2 | – | 0 |
| No. 10 Boise State ^ | 6 | – | 2 | – | 0 | 10 | – | 4 | – | 0 |
| No. 13 Idaho ^ | 6 | – | 2 | – | 0 | 9 | – | 4 | – | 0 |
| Montana | 4 | – | 4 | – | 0 | 7 | – | 4 | – | 0 |
| Northern Arizona | 3 | – | 5 | – | 0 | 5 | – | 6 | – | 0 |
| Weber State | 3 | – | 5 | – | 0 | 5 | – | 6 | – | 0 |
| Eastern Washington | 3 | – | 5 | – | 0 | 5 | – | 6 | – | 0 |
| Montana State | 3 | – | 5 | – | 0 | 4 | – | 7 | – | 0 |
| Idaho State | 1 | – | 7 | – | 0 | 3 | – | 8 | – | 0 |
$ – Conference champion; ^ – NCAA Division I-AA playoff participant; Rankings from NCAA Division I-AA Poll

1990 Gateway Collegiate Athletic Conference football standings
| | Conf. | | | | | Overall |
| Team | W | | L | | T | W | | L | | T |
|---|---|---|---|---|---|---|---|---|---|---|
| No. 6 Southwest Missouri State +^ | 5 | – | 1 | – | 0 | 9 | – | 3 | – | 0 |
| No. 11 Northern Iowa +^ | 5 | – | 1 | – | 0 | 8 | – | 4 | – | 0 |
| Eastern Illinois | 3 | – | 3 | – | 0 | 5 | – | 6 | – | 0 |
| Illinois State | 3 | – | 3 | – | 0 | 5 | – | 6 | – | 0 |
| Western Illinois | 3 | – | 3 | – | 0 | 3 | – | 8 | – | 0 |
| Indiana State | 1 | – | 5 | – | 0 | 4 | – | 7 | – | 0 |
| Southern Illinois | 1 | – | 5 | – | 0 | 2 | – | 9 | – | 0 |
+ – Conference co-champions; ^ – NCAA Division I-AA playoff participant; Rankings from NCAA Division I-AA Football Committee poll

1990 Ivy League football standings
| | Conf. | | | | | Overall |
| Team | W | | L | | T | W | | L | | T |
|---|---|---|---|---|---|---|---|---|---|---|
| No. 17 Dartmouth + | 6 | – | 1 | – | 0 | 7 | – | 2 | – | 1 |
| Cornell + | 6 | – | 1 | – | 0 | 7 | – | 3 | – | 0 |
| Yale | 5 | – | 2 | – | 0 | 6 | – | 4 | – | 0 |
| Harvard | 3 | – | 4 | – | 0 | 5 | – | 5 | – | 0 |
| Penn | 3 | – | 4 | – | 0 | 3 | – | 7 | – | 0 |
| Princeton | 2 | – | 5 | – | 0 | 3 | – | 7 | – | 0 |
| Brown | 2 | – | 5 | – | 0 | 2 | – | 8 | – | 0 |
| Columbia | 1 | – | 6 | – | 0 | 1 | – | 9 | – | 0 |
+ – Conference co-champions; Rankings from NCAA Division I-AA Football Committee poll

1990 Mid-Eastern Athletic Conference football standings
| | Conf. | | | | | Overall |
| Team | W | | L | | T | W | | L | | T |
|---|---|---|---|---|---|---|---|---|---|---|
| Florida A&M $ | 6 | – | 0 | – | 0 | 7 | – | 4 | – | 0 |
| No. T–19 North Carolina A&T | 5 | – | 1 | – | 0 | 9 | – | 2 | – | 0 |
| Delaware State | 4 | – | 2 | – | 0 | 7 | – | 3 | – | 0 |
| Howard | 3 | – | 3 | – | 0 | 6 | – | 5 | – | 0 |
| South Carolina State | 2 | – | 4 | – | 0 | 4 | – | 6 | – | 0 |
| Bethune–Cookman | 1 | – | 5 | – | 0 | 4 | – | 7 | – | 0 |
| Morgan State | 0 | – | 6 | – | 0 | 1 | – | 10 | – | 0 |
$ – Conference champion; Rankings from NCAA Division I-AA Football Committee poll

1990 Ohio Valley Conference football standings
| | Conf. | | | | | Overall |
| Team | W | | L | | T | W | | L | | T |
|---|---|---|---|---|---|---|---|---|---|---|
| No. 1 Middle Tennessee +^ | 5 | – | 1 | – | 0 | 11 | – | 2 | – | 0 |
| No. 5 Eastern Kentucky +^ | 5 | – | 1 | – | 0 | 10 | – | 2 | – | 0 |
| Tennessee State | 4 | – | 2 | – | 0 | 7 | – | 4 | – | 0 |
| Tennessee Tech | 3 | – | 3 | – | 0 | 6 | – | 5 | – | 0 |
| Morehead State | 3 | – | 3 | – | 0 | 5 | – | 6 | – | 0 |
| Murray State | 1 | – | 5 | – | 0 | 2 | – | 9 | – | 0 |
| Austin Peay | 0 | – | 6 | – | 0 | 0 | – | 11 | – | 0 |
+ – Conference co-champions; ^ – NCAA Division I-AA playoff participant; Rankings from NCAA Division I-AA Football Committee poll

1990 Patriot League football standings
| | Conf. | | | | | Overall |
| Team | W | | L | | T | W | | L | | T |
|---|---|---|---|---|---|---|---|---|---|---|
| No. 8 Holy Cross $ | 5 | – | 0 | – | 0 | 9 | – | 1 | – | 1 |
| Bucknell | 3 | – | 2 | – | 0 | 7 | – | 4 | – | 0 |
| Colgate | 3 | – | 2 | – | 0 | 7 | – | 4 | – | 0 |
| Lehigh | 3 | – | 2 | – | 0 | 7 | – | 4 | – | 0 |
| Lafayette | 1 | – | 4 | – | 0 | 4 | – | 7 | – | 0 |
| Fordham | 0 | – | 5 | – | 0 | 1 | – | 9 | – | 0 |
$ – Conference champion; Rankings from NCAA Division I-AA Football Committee poll

1990 Southern Conference football standings
| | Conf. | | | | | Overall |
| Team | W | | L | | T | W | | L | | T |
|---|---|---|---|---|---|---|---|---|---|---|
| No. 12 Furman $^ | 6 | – | 1 | – | 0 | 9 | – | 4 | – | 0 |
| Appalachian State | 5 | – | 2 | – | 0 | 6 | – | 5 | – | 0 |
| Chattanooga | 4 | – | 2 | – | 0 | 6 | – | 5 | – | 0 |
| No. 15 The Citadel ^ | 4 | – | 3 | – | 0 | 7 | – | 5 | – | 0 |
| Marshall | 4 | – | 3 | – | 0 | 6 | – | 5 | – | 0 |
| Western Carolina | 2 | – | 5 | – | 0 | 3 | – | 8 | – | 0 |
| VMI | 1 | – | 5 | – | 0 | 4 | – | 7 | – | 0 |
| East Tennessee State | 1 | – | 6 | – | 0 | 2 | – | 9 | – | 0 |
$ – Conference champion; ^ – NCAA Division I-AA playoff participant; Rankings from NCAA Division I-AA Football Committee poll

1990 Southland Conference football standings
| | Conf. | | | | | Overall |
| Team | W | | L | | T | W | | L | | T |
|---|---|---|---|---|---|---|---|---|---|---|
| No. 14 Northeast Louisiana $^ | 5 | – | 1 | – | 0 | 7 | – | 5 | – | 0 |
| McNeese State | 4 | – | 2 | – | 0 | 5 | – | 6 | – | 0 |
| Southwest Texas State | 3 | – | 3 | – | 0 | 6 | – | 5 | – | 0 |
| Northwestern State | 3 | – | 3 | – | 0 | 5 | – | 6 | – | 0 |
| Sam Houston State | 3 | – | 3 | – | 0 | 4 | – | 7 | – | 0 |
| North Texas | 2 | – | 4 | – | 0 | 6 | – | 5 | – | 0 |
| Stephen F. Austin | 1 | – | 5 | – | 0 | 1 | – | 10 | – | 0 |
$ – Conference champion; ^ – NCAA Division I-AA playoff participant; Rankings from NCAA Division I-AA Football Committee poll

1990 Southwestern Athletic Conference football standings
| | Conf. | | | | | Overall |
| Team | W | | L | | T | W | | L | | T |
|---|---|---|---|---|---|---|---|---|---|---|
| No. 16 Jackson State $^ | 5 | – | 1 | – | 0 | 8 | – | 4 | – | 0 |
| Alabama State | 4 | – | 2 | – | 0 | 8 | – | 2 | – | 1 |
| Grambling State | 3 | – | 3 | – | 0 | 8 | – | 3 | – | 0 |
| Mississippi Valley State | 3 | – | 3 | – | 0 | 5 | – | 6 | – | 0 |
| Southern | 2 | – | 4 | – | 0 | 4 | – | 7 | – | 0 |
| Texas Southern | 2 | – | 4 | – | 0 | 4 | – | 7 | – | 0 |
| Alcorn State | 2 | – | 4 | – | 0 | 2 | – | 7 | – | 0 |
$ – Conference champion; ^ – NCAA Division I-AA playoff participant; Rankings from NCAA Division I-AA Football Committee poll

1990 Yankee Conference football standings
| | Conf. | | | | | Overall |
| Team | W | | L | | T | W | | L | | T |
|---|---|---|---|---|---|---|---|---|---|---|
| No. 9 UMass $^ | 7 | – | 1 | – | 0 | 8 | – | 2 | – | 1 |
| No. T–19 New Hampshire | 5 | – | 3 | – | 0 | 7 | – | 3 | – | 1 |
| Delaware | 5 | – | 3 | – | 0 | 6 | – | 5 | – | 0 |
| Connecticut | 5 | – | 3 | – | 0 | 6 | – | 5 | – | 0 |
| Villanova | 5 | – | 3 | – | 0 | 6 | – | 5 | – | 0 |
| Boston University | 4 | – | 4 | – | 0 | 5 | – | 6 | – | 0 |
| Maine | 2 | – | 6 | – | 0 | 3 | – | 8 | – | 0 |
| Rhode Island | 2 | – | 6 | – | 0 | 5 | – | 6 | – | 0 |
| Richmond | 1 | – | 7 | – | 0 | 1 | – | 10 | – | 0 |
$ – Conference champion; ^ – NCAA Division I-AA playoff participant; Rankings from NCAA Division I-AA Football Committee poll

1990 NCAA Division I-AA independents football standings
| | Conf. | | | Overall |
| Team | W | L | T | W | | L | | T |
|---|---|---|---|---|---|---|---|---|
| No. 2 Youngstown State ^ | | – | | 11 | – | 1 | – | 0 |
| No. 7 William & Mary ^ | | – | | 10 | – | 2 | – | 0 |
| No. 3 Georgia Southern ^ | | – | | 9 | – | 3 | – | 0 |
| No. 18 UCF ^ | | – | | 9 | – | 3 | – | 0 |
| Liberty | | – | | 7 | – | 4 | – | 0 |
| Samford | | – | | 6 | – | 4 | – | 1 |
| James Madison | | – | | 5 | – | 6 | – | 0 |
| Nicholls State | | – | | 5 | – | 6 | – | 0 |
| Arkansas State | | – | | 3 | – | 7 | – | 1 |
| Western Kentucky | | – | | 2 | – | 8 | – | 0 |
| Towson State | | – | | 2 | – | 9 | – | 0 |
| Northeastern | | – | | 1 | – | 10 | – | 0 |
^ – NCAA Division I-AA playoff participant; Rankings from NCAA Division I-AA Football Committee poll

== Conference champions ==
| Conference | Champion |
|---|---|
| Big Sky Conference | Nevada |
| Gateway Collegiate Athletic Conference | Northern Iowa |
| Ivy League | Cornell and Dartmouth |
| Mid-Eastern Athletic Conference | Florida A&M |
| Ohio Valley Conference | Eastern Kentucky and Middle Tennessee State |
| Patriot League | Holy Cross |
| Southern Conference | Furman |
| Southland Conference | Northeast Louisiana |
| Southwestern Athletic Conference | Jackson State |
| Yankee Conference | Massachusetts |

== Postseason ==
The top four teams were seeded, and thus assured of home games in the opening round. The location of the final, the Georgia Southern Eagles' Paulson Stadium, had been predetermined via a three-year agreement the university reached with the NCAA in February 1989.

=== NCAA Division I-AA playoff bracket ===
First Round; November 24; Campus sites
Jackson State | 7
(1) Middle Tennessee State* | 28
Northern Iowa | 3
Boise State* | 20
Northeast Louisiana | 14
(4) Nevada* | 27
Furman | 45
Eastern Kentucky* | 17
UCF | 20
(2) Youngstown State* | 17
UMass | 0
William & Mary* | 38
The Citadel | 0
(3) Georgia Southern* | 31
Idaho | 41
Southwest Missouri State* | 35

Quarterfinals; December 1 Campus sites
(1) Middle Tennessee State | 13
Boise State* | 20
(4) Nevada* | 42***
Furman | 35
UCF* | 52
William & Mary | 38
(3) Georgia Southern* | 28
Idaho | 27

Semifinals; December 8 Campus sites
Boise State | 52
(4) Nevada* | 59***
UCF | 7
(3) Georgia Southern* | 44

National Championship Game; December 15; Paulson Stadium; Statesboro, GA
(4) Nevada | 13
(3) Georgia Southern | 36

* By team name denotes host institution
* By score denotes overtime periods
