= 1990 Northeast Louisiana Indians football team =

American college football season

1990 Northeast Louisiana Indians football

SLC champion

NCAA Division I-AA First Round, L 14–27 vs. Nevada
- Conference: Southland Conference
- Record: 7–5 (5–1 SLC)
- Head coach: Dave Roberts (2nd season)
- Offensive coordinator: Norman Joseph (1st season)
- Home stadium: Malone Stadium

1990 Southland Conference football standings
	Conf.					Overall
Team	W		L		T	W		L		T
No. 14 Northeast Louisiana $^	5	–	1	–	0	7	–	5	–	0
McNeese State	4	–	2	–	0	5	–	6	–	0
Southwest Texas State	3	–	3	–	0	6	–	5	–	0
Northwestern State	3	–	3	–	0	5	–	6	–	0
Sam Houston State	3	–	3	–	0	4	–	7	–	0
North Texas	2	–	4	–	0	6	–	5	–	0
Stephen F. Austin	1	–	5	–	0	1	–	10	–	0
$ – Conference champion; ^ – NCAA Division I-AA playoff participant; Rankings from NCAA Division I-AA Football Committee poll

The 1990 Northeast Louisiana Indians football team was an American football team that represented Northeast Louisiana University (now known as the University of Louisiana at Monroe) as part of the Southland Conference during the 1990 NCAA Division I-AA football season. In their second year under head coach Dave Roberts, the team compiled a 7–5 record.

== Schedule ==
Date	Opponent	Site	Result	Attendance	Source
September 8	at Arkansas State*	Indian Stadium; Jonesboro, AR	L 18–23	15,657	
September 15	Mississippi College*	Malone Stadium; Monroe, LA	W 17–7	20,194	
September 22	Southwest Texas State	Malone Stadium; Monroe, LA	W 30–27	15,128	
September 29	at Georgia Southern*	Paulson Stadium; Statesboro, GA	L 14–33	16,048	
October 6	at McNeese State	Cowboy Stadium; Lake Charles, LA	L 14–19		
October 13	Sam Houston State	Malone Stadium; Monroe, LA	W 27–10		
October 20	at Nicholls State*	John L. Guidry Stadium; Thibodaux, LA	W 27–20		
October 27	Northwestern State	Malone Stadium; Monroe, LA	W 14–3	15,718	
November 3	Louisiana Tech*	Malone Stadium; Monroe, LA	L 7–31	21,752	
November 10	Stephen F. Austin	Malone Stadium; Monroe, LA	W 10–3		
November 17	at North Texas	Fouts Field; Denton, TX	W 16–15	6,875	
November 24	at Nevada*	Mackay Stadium; Reno, NV (Division I-AA First Round)	L 14–27		
*Non-conference game
