= 1990 NCAA Division I-AA football rankings =

The 1990 NCAA Division I-AA football rankings are from the NCAA Division I-AA football committee. This is for the 1990 season.

== Legend ==
	Increase in ranking
	Decrease in ranking
	Not ranked previous week
(#–#)	Win–loss record
(Italics)	Number of first place votes
т	Tied with team above or below also with this symbol

== NCAA Division I-AA Football Committee poll ==
	Preseason	Week 1 Sept 18	Week 2 Sept 25	Week 3 Oct 2	Week 4 Oct 9	Week 5 Oct 16	Week 6 Oct 23	Week 7 Oct 30	Week 8 Nov 6	Week 9 Nov 13	Week 10 Nov 20	
1.	Georgia Southern (4)	Furman (3–0) (3)	Middle Tennessee State (4–0) (4)	Middle Tennessee State (5–0) (4)	Eastern Kentucky (5–0) (4)	Eastern Kentucky (6–0) (4)	Eastern Kentucky (7–0) (4)	Eastern Kentucky (8–0) (4)	Eastern Kentucky (9–0) (4)	Eastern Kentucky (10–0) (4)	Middle Tennessee State (10–1) (4)	1.
2.	Stephen F. Austin	Middle Tennessee State (3–0) (1)	Montana (3–0)	Grambling State (4–0)	Grambling State (5–0)	SW Missouri State (6–1)	SW Missouri State (7–1)	SW Missouri State (8–1)	Nevada (9–0)	Middle Tennessee State (9–1)	Youngstown State (11–0)	2.
3.	Eastern Kentucky	Montana (2–0)	New Hampshire (3–0)	SW Missouri State (4–1)	SW Missouri State (5–1)	Nevada (6–0)	Nevada (7–0)	Nevada (8–0)	Middle Tennessee State (8–1)	Youngstown State (10–0)	Georgia Southern (8–3)	3.
4.	Furman т	New Hampshire (2–0)	Furman (3–1)	Eastern Kentucky (4–0)	Nevada (5–0)	Middle Tennessee State (6–1)	Middle Tennessee State (7–1)	Middle Tennessee State (8–1)	Youngstown State (9–0)	UMass (8–0–1)	Nevada (10–1)	4.
5.	Holy Cross т	Grambling State (2–0)	Grambling State (3–0)	Nevada (4–0)	Middle Tennessee State (5–1)	New Hampshire (5–0–1)	New Hampshire (6–0–1)	Youngstown State (8–0)	UMass (7–0–1)	Boise State (8–2)	Eastern Kentucky (10–1)	5.
6.	Montana	SW Missouri State (2–1)	SW Missouri State (3–1)	New Hampshire (3–0–1) т	New Hampshire (4–0–1)	Youngstown State (7–0)	Youngstown State (8–0)	UMass (6–0–1)	Boise State (7–2)	Georgia Southern (7–3)	SW Missouri State (9–2)	6.
7.	SW Missouri State	North Texas (2–0)	Eastern Kentucky (3–0)	Youngstown State (5–0) т	Youngstown State (6–0)	UMass (4–0–1)	UMass (5–0–1)	Furman (6–2)	Georgia Southern (6–3)	Nevada (9–1)	William & Mary (9–2)	7.
8.	Connecticut	Eastern Kentucky (2–0)	Liberty (4–0)	Montana (3–1)	UMass (3–0–1)	Furman (5–2)	Furman (5–2)	Boise State (6–2)	SW Missouri State (8–2)	SW Missouri State (9–2)	Holy Cross (9–1–1)	8.
9.	Grambling State	Liberty (3–0)	The Citadel (2–1)	Marshall (3–1)	Furman (4–2)	Boise State (5–2)	Boise State (5–2)	Georgia Southern (5–3)	William & Mary (7–2)	William & Mary (8–2)	UMass (8–1–1)	9.
10.	William & Mary	Eastern Washington (2–0)	Nevada (3–0)	Eastern Washington (3–1)	Boise State (4–2)	Northern Iowa (4–2)	Georgia Southern (4–3)	William & Mary (6–2)	Holy Cross (7–1–1)	Holy Cross (8–1–1)	Boise State (8–3)	10.
11.	Middle Tennessee State	The Citadel (1–1)	Rhode Island (3–0)	UMass (2–0–1)	Colgate (4–2)	Georgia Southern (3–3) т	William & Mary (5–2)	Holy Cross (6–1–1)	Jackson State (7–2)	The Citadel (7–3)	Northern Iowa (8–3)	11.
12.	Boise State	Rhode Island (2–0)	Youngstown State (4–0)	Furman (3–2)	The Citadel (3–2)	Grambling State (5–1) т	Jackson State (6–2)	Jackson State (6–2)	The Citadel (6–3)	Northern Iowa (7–3)	Furman (8–3)	12.
13.	Youngstown State	Nevada (2–0)	North Texas (2–1)	Liberty (4–1)	Northern Iowa (3–2)	North Texas (4–2)	Holy Cross (5–1–1)	New Hampshire (6–1–1)	SW Texas State (6–3)	Furman (7–3)	Idaho (8–3)	13.
14.	NE Louisiana	Western Kentucky (2–0)	Boise State (3–1)	Colgate (3–1) т	Georgia Southern (3–3)	William & Mary (4–2)	Montana (5–2)	Montana (6–2)	Northern Iowa (6–3)	Idaho (7–3)	NE Louisiana (7–4)	14.
15.	Florida A&M	Youngstown State (3–0)	NE Louisiana (2–1)	Jackson State (4–1) т	North Texas (3–2)	Holy Cross (4–1–1)	SW Texas State (5–3)	SW Texas State (6–3)	Furman (6–3)	NE Louisiana (6–4)	The Citadel (7–4)	15.
16.	Colgate	Appalachian State (1–1)	Texas Southern (4–0)	Northwestern State (2–2)	William & Mary (3–2)	Jackson State (5–2)	The Citadel (4–3)	The Citadel (5–3)	North Carolina A&T (8–1)	Jackson State (7–3)	Jackson State (8–3)	16.
17.	Eastern Illinois т	Boise State (2–1)	UMass (1–0–1)	Northern Iowa (2–2)	Marshall (3–2)	Montana (4–2)	Northern Iowa (4–3)	Northern Iowa (5–3)	Idaho (6–3)	Dartmouth (6–2–1)	Dartmouth (7–2–1)	17.
18.	North Texas т	NE Louisiana (1–0–1) т	Northern Iowa (2–2)	The Citadel (2–2)	Weber State (4–2)	Tennessee Tech (5–2)	Tennessee Tech (5–2)	North Carolina A&T (7–1)	Marshall (5–4)	UCF (7–3)	UCF (8–3)	18.
19.	Nevada	UMass (1–0–1) т	Western Kentucky (2–1)	Boise State (3–2)	Eastern Washington (3–2)	SW Texas State (4–3)	McNeese State (4–3)	Colgate (6–2)	Montana (6–3)	North Texas (6–4)	New Hampshire (7–3–1) т	19.
20.	The Citadel	Lehigh (2–0)	Eastern Washington (2–1) т	Georgia Southern (2–3)	Holy Cross (3–1–1)	Bucknell (5–1)	North Carolina A&T (6–1) т	NE Louisiana (5–3)	New Hampshire (6–2–1) т	SW Texas State (6–4)	North Carolina A&T (9–2) т	20.
21.			William & Mary (2–1) т				Chattanooga (4–3) т		Dartmouth (5–2–1) т			21.
	Preseason	Week 1 Sept 18	Week 2 Sept 25	Week 3 Oct 2	Week 4 Oct 9	Week 5 Oct 16	Week 6 Oct 23	Week 7 Oct 30	Week 8 Nov 6	Week 9 Nov 13	Week 10 Nov 20	
		Dropped: 1 Georgia Southern; 2 Stephen F. Austin; 5 Holy Cross; 8 Connecticut; 10 William & Mary; 15 Florida A&M; 16 Colgate; 17 Eastern Illinois	Dropped: 16 Appalachian State; 20 Lehigh	Dropped: 11 Rhode Island; 13 North Texas; 15 NE Louisiana; 16 Texas Southern; 19 Western Kentucky; T–20 William & Mary	Dropped: 8 Montana; 13 Liberty; 15 Jackson State; 16 Northwestern State	Dropped: 11 Colgate; 12 The Citadel; 17 Marshall; 18 Weber State; 19 Eastern Washington	Dropped: 12 Grambling State; 13 North Texas; 20 Bucknell	Dropped: 18 Tennessee Tech; 19 McNeese State; T–20 Chattanooga	Dropped: 19 Colgate; 20 NE Louisiana	Dropped: 16 North Carolina A&T; 18 Marshall; 19 Montana; 20 New Hampshire	Dropped: 19 North Texas; 20 SW Texas State	
