= 1990 Furman Paladins football team =

American college football season

1990 Furman Paladins football

SoCon champion

NCAA Division I-AA Quarterfinal, L 35–42 vs. Nevada
- Conference: Southern Conference
- Record: 9–4 (6–1 SoCon)
- Head coach: Jimmy Satterfield (5th season)
- Captains: Frankie DeBusk; Steve Duggan; Kevin Kendrick
- Home stadium: Paladin Stadium

1990 Southern Conference football standings
	Conf.					Overall
Team	W		L		T	W		L		T
No. 12 Furman $^	6	–	1	–	0	9	–	4	–	0
Appalachian State	5	–	2	–	0	6	–	5	–	0
Chattanooga	4	–	2	–	0	6	–	5	–	0
No. 15 The Citadel ^	4	–	3	–	0	7	–	5	–	0
Marshall	4	–	3	–	0	6	–	5	–	0
Western Carolina	2	–	5	–	0	3	–	8	–	0
VMI	1	–	5	–	0	4	–	7	–	0
East Tennessee State	1	–	6	–	0	2	–	9	–	0
$ – Conference champion; ^ – NCAA Division I-AA playoff participant; Rankings from NCAA Division I-AA Football Committee poll

The 1990 Furman Paladins football team was an American football team that represented Furman University as a member of the Southern Conference (SoCon) during the 1990 NCAA Division I-AA football season. In their fifth year under head coach Jimmy Satterfield, the Paladins compiled an overall record of 9–4 with a conference mark of 6–1, winning the SoCon title. Furman advanced to the NCAA Division I-AA Football Championship playoffs, where they defeated Eastern Kentucky in the first round and lost to Nevada in the quarterfinals.

== Schedule ==
Date	Opponent	Rank	Site	Result	Attendance	Source
September 1	South Carolina State*		Paladin Stadium; Greenville, SC	W 24–7	13,611	
September 8	Presbyterian*		Paladin Stadium; Greenville, SC	W 63–7	15,086	
September 15	at Chattanooga		Chamberlain Field; Chattanooga, TN	W 38–21	10,215	
September 22	at No. 19 (I-A) Florida*	No. 1	Ben Hill Griffin Stadium; Gainesville, FL	L 3–27	71,868	
September 29	at Marshall	No. 4	Fairfield Stadium; Huntington, WV	L 7–10		
October 6	VMI	No. 12	Paladin Stadium; Greenville, SC	W 51–22	14,242	
October 13	at Appalachian State	No. 9	Kidd Brewer Stadium; Boone, NC	W 30–7	13,842	
October 27	Western Carolina	No. 8	Paladin Stadium; Greenville, SC	W 42–9	14,910	
November 3	at No. 10 William & Mary*	No. 7	Zable Stadium; Williamsburg, VA	L 28–38	15,000	
November 10	at East Tennessee State	No. 15	Memorial Center; Johnson City, TN	W 29–13		
November 17	The Citadel	No. 13	Paladin Stadium; Greenville, SC (rivalry)	W 30–17	18,190	
November 24	at No. 5 Eastern Kentucky*	No. 12	Roy Kidd Stadium; Richmond, KY (NCAA Division I-AA First Round)	W 45–17	4,528	
December 1	at No. 4 Nevada*	No. 12	Mackay Stadium; Reno, NV (NCAA Division I-AA Quarterfinal)	L 35–42 ^{3OT}	11,519	
*Non-conference game; Rankings from NCAA Division I-AA Football Committee Poll released prior to the game
