= 1990 Arkansas State Indians football team =

American college football season

1990 Arkansas State Indians football
- Conference: Independent
- Record: 3–7–1
- Head coach: Al Kincaid (1st season)
- Offensive coordinator: Keith Daniels (1st season)
- Defensive coordinator: Pat Collins (1st season)
- Home stadium: Indian Stadium

1990 NCAA Division I-AA independents football standings
| | Conf. | | | Overall |
| Team | W | L | T | W | | L | | T |
|---|---|---|---|---|---|---|---|---|
| No. 2 Youngstown State ^ | | – | | 11 | – | 1 | – | 0 |
| No. 7 William & Mary ^ | | – | | 10 | – | 2 | – | 0 |
| No. 3 Georgia Southern ^ | | – | | 9 | – | 3 | – | 0 |
| No. 18 UCF ^ | | – | | 9 | – | 3 | – | 0 |
| Liberty | | – | | 7 | – | 4 | – | 0 |
| Samford | | – | | 6 | – | 4 | – | 1 |
| James Madison | | – | | 5 | – | 6 | – | 0 |
| Nicholls State | | – | | 5 | – | 6 | – | 0 |
| Arkansas State | | – | | 3 | – | 7 | – | 1 |
| Western Kentucky | | – | | 2 | – | 8 | – | 0 |
| Towson State | | – | | 2 | – | 9 | – | 0 |
| Northeastern | | – | | 1 | – | 10 | – | 0 |
^ – NCAA Division I-AA playoff participant; Rankings from NCAA Division I-AA Football Committee poll

The 1990 Arkansas State Indians football team represented Arkansas State University as an independent during the 1990 NCAA Division I-AA football season. Led by first-year head coach Al Kincaid, the Indians finished the season with a record of 3–7–1. They were outscored by their opponents 313 to 200.

== Schedule ==
| Date | Time | Opponent | Site | Result | Attendance | Source |
|---|---|---|---|---|---|---|
| September 1 | | at Memphis State | Liberty Bowl Memorial Stadium; Memphis, TN (Paint Bucket Bowl) | T 24–24 | 50,178 | |
| September 8 | | Northeast Louisiana | Indian Stadium; Jonesboro, AR | W 23–18 | 15,657 | |
| September 15 | | at Wyoming | War Memorial Stadium; Laramie, WY | L 27–34 | 18,433 | |
| September 22 | | at Louisiana Tech | Joe Aillet Stadium; Ruston, LA | L 7–40 | 18,325 | |
| September 29 | | at Southern Illinois | McAndrew Stadium; Carbondale, IL | W 20–17 | 11,500 | |
| October 6 | | Northwestern State^{†} | Indian Stadium; Jonesboro, AR | W 16–8 | 16,839 | |
| October 13 | 1:00 p.m. | at Northern Illinois | Huskie Stadium; DeKalb, IL | L 0–35 | 6,631 | |
| October 20 | 1:00 p.m. | at No. 18 (I-A) Ole Miss | Vaught–Hemingway Stadium; Oxford, MS | L 13–42 | 39,000 | |
| November 3 | | at North Texas | Fouts Field; Denton, TX | L 26–35 | 5,925 | |
| November 10 | | Southwestern Louisiana | Indian Stadium; Jonesboro, AR | L 16–17 | 13,462 | |
| November 17 | 3:30 p.m. | at Toledo | Glass Bowl; Toledo, OH | L 28–43 | 15,306 | |
^{†}Homecoming; Rankings from NCAA Division I-AA Football Committee Poll released prior to the game; All times are in Central time
