= 1990 Samford Bulldogs football team =

American college football season

1990 Samford Bulldogs football
- Conference: Independent
- Record: 6–4–1
- Head coach: Terry Bowden (4th season)
- Offensive coordinator: Jeff Bowden (4th season)
- Defensive coordinator: Jack Hines (4th season)
- Home stadium: Seibert Stadium

1990 NCAA Division I-AA independents football standings
	Conf.			Overall
Team	W	L	T	W		L		T
No. 2 Youngstown State ^		–		11	–	1	–	0
No. 7 William & Mary ^		–		10	–	2	–	0
No. 3 Georgia Southern ^		–		9	–	3	–	0
No. 18 UCF ^		–		9	–	3	–	0
Liberty		–		7	–	4	–	0
Samford		–		6	–	4	–	1
James Madison		–		5	–	6	–	0
Nicholls State		–		5	–	6	–	0
Arkansas State		–		3	–	7	–	1
Western Kentucky		–		2	–	8	–	0
Towson State		–		2	–	9	–	0
Northeastern		–		1	–	10	–	0
^ – NCAA Division I-AA playoff participant; Rankings from NCAA Division I-AA Football Committee poll

The 1990 Samford Bulldogs football team was an American football team that represented Samford University as an independent during the 1990 NCAA Division I-AA football season. Led by fourth-year head coach Terry Bowden, the team compiled a 6–4–1 record.

== Schedule ==
Date	Opponent	Site	Result	Attendance	Source
September 1	vs. Alabama State	Legion Field; Birmingham, AL	T 24–24	10,500	
September 8	at East Tennessee State	Memorial Center; Johnson City, TN	W 17–13		
September 15	at Tennessee Tech	Tucker Stadium; Cookeville, TN	L 7–21	8,100	
September 29	Austin Peay	Seibert Stadium; Homewood, AL	W 28–9	5,519	
October 6	UCF	Seibert Stadium; Homewood, AL	L 16–37	5,463	
October 13	Fayetteville State	Seibert Stadium; Homewood, AL	W 37–10		
October 20	at Morehead State	Jayne Stadium; Morehead, KY	W 25–22		
October 28	at Liberty	Willard May Stadium; Lynchburg, VA	L 10–37	12,050	
November 3	Catawba	Seibert Stadium; Homewood, AL	W 31–15		
November 10	Concord	Seibert Stadium; Homewood, AL	W 49–14		
November 17	at No. 6 Georgia Southern	Paulson Stadium; Statesboro, GA	L 24–31	18,271	
Rankings from NCAA Division I-AA Football Committee Poll released prior to the game
