= Carlton Palmer (American football) =

American athlete and coach

Biographical details
- Born: May 8, 1895; Salamanca, New York, U.S.

Playing career

Football
- 1915–1916: Lewis Institute

Basketball
- 1913–1914: American College of Physical Education
- 1915–1916: Lewis Institute

Baseball
- 1914: American College of Physical Education
- 1916–1917: Lewis Institute

Coaching career (HC unless noted)

Football
- 1926–1927: Tusculum

Basketball
- 1917–1918: Vanderbilt
- 1926–1928: Tusculum

Baseball
- 1918: Vanderbilt

Administrative career (AD unless noted)
- c. 1918: Camp Grant (assistant AD)
- 1926–1928: Tusculum

Wallace Carlton "Ralph" Palmer (born May 8, 1895) was an American college football, basketball and baseball player and coach. He served as the head football coach at Tusculum College in Greenville, Tennessee from 1926 to 1928. He previously served as the head men's basketball coach (1917–1918) and baseball coach (1918) at Vanderbilt University. During World War I, Carlson was assistant athletic director at Camp Grant.
