= 1990 James Madison Dukes football team =

American college football season

1990 James Madison Dukes football
- Conference: Independent
- Record: 5–6
- Head coach: Joe Purzycki (6th season)
- Offensive coordinator: Tony DeMeo (1st season)
- Home stadium: Bridgeforth Stadium

1990 NCAA Division I-AA independents football standings
	Conf.			Overall
Team	W	L	T	W		L		T
No. 2 Youngstown State ^		–		11	–	1	–	0
No. 7 William & Mary ^		–		10	–	2	–	0
No. 3 Georgia Southern ^		–		9	–	3	–	0
No. 18 UCF ^		–		9	–	3	–	0
Liberty		–		7	–	4	–	0
Samford		–		6	–	4	–	1
James Madison		–		5	–	6	–	0
Nicholls State		–		5	–	6	–	0
Arkansas State		–		3	–	7	–	1
Western Kentucky		–		2	–	8	–	0
Towson State		–		2	–	9	–	0
Northeastern		–		1	–	10	–	0
^ – NCAA Division I-AA playoff participant; Rankings from NCAA Division I-AA Football Committee poll

The 1990 James Madison Dukes football team was an American football team that represented James Madison University during the 1990 NCAA Division I-AA football season as an independent. In their sixth year under head coach Joe Purzycki, the team compiled a 5–6 record.

== Schedule ==
Date	Opponent	Site	Result	Attendance	Source
September 8	Liberty	Bridgeforth Stadium; Harrisonburg, VA	L 19–22		
September 15	at VMI	Alumni Memorial Field; Lexington, VA	L 21–24	7,850	
September 22	at Richmond	City Stadium; Richmond, VA (rivalry)	W 29–0	7,713	
September 29	Newberry	Bridgeforth Stadium; Harrisonburg, VA	W 52–7		
October 6	Northeastern	Bridgeforth Stadium; Harrisonburg, VA	W 21–0		
October 13	at Towson State	Minnegan Stadium; Towson, MD	W 21–14		
October 20	Youngstown State	Bridgeforth Stadium; Harrisonburg, VA	L 15–31	12,812	
October 27	at Navy	Navy–Marine Corps Memorial Stadium; Annapolis, MD	W 16–7	29,129	
November 3	at No. 9 Georgia Southern	Paulson Stadium; Statesboro, GA	L 13–31	21,067	
November 10	No. 9 William & Mary	Bridgeforth Stadium; Harrisonburg, VA (rivalry)	L 21–31		
November 17	Appalachian State	Bridgeforth Stadium; Harrisonburg, VA	L 0–24	3,786	
Rankings from NCAA Division I-AA Football Committee Poll released prior to the game
