= 1990 Liberty Flames football team =

American college football season

1990 Liberty Flames football
- Conference: Independent
- Record: 7–4
- Head coach: Sam Rutigliano (2nd season)
- Home stadium: Willard May Stadium

1990 NCAA Division I-AA independents football standings
	Conf.			Overall
Team	W	L	T	W		L		T
No. 2 Youngstown State ^		–		11	–	1	–	0
No. 7 William & Mary ^		–		10	–	2	–	0
No. 3 Georgia Southern ^		–		9	–	3	–	0
No. 18 UCF ^		–		9	–	3	–	0
Liberty		–		7	–	4	–	0
Samford		–		6	–	4	–	1
James Madison		–		5	–	6	–	0
Nicholls State		–		5	–	6	–	0
Arkansas State		–		3	–	7	–	1
Western Kentucky		–		2	–	8	–	0
Towson State		–		2	–	9	–	0
Northeastern		–		1	–	10	–	0
^ – NCAA Division I-AA playoff participant; Rankings from NCAA Division I-AA Football Committee poll

The 1990 Liberty Flames football team represented Liberty University as an independent during the 1990 NCAA Division I-AA football season. Led by second-year head coach Sam Rutigliano, the Flames compiled an overall record of 7–4.

== Schedule ==
Date	Opponent	Rank	Site	Result	Attendance	Source
September 1	Kutztown		Willard May Stadium; Lynchburg, VA	W 22–12		
September 8	at James Madison		Bridgeforth Stadium; Harrisonburg, VA	W 22–19		
September 15	Southwest Texas State		Willard May Stadium; Lynchburg, VA	W 35–22	7,540	
September 22	Morehead State	No. 9	Willard May Stadium; Lynchburg, VA	W 42–13		
September 29	at Villanova	No. 8	Villanova Stadium; Villanova, PA	L 14–26	13,125	
October 6	Delaware State	No. 13	Willard May Stadium; Lynchburg, VA	L 37–38		
October 13	No. 7 Youngstown State		Willard May Stadium; Lynchburg, VA	L 6–34		
October 21	at Towson State		Minnegan Stadium; Towson, MD	W 30–10		
October 28	Samford^{†}		Willard May Stadium; Lynchburg, VA	W 37–10	12,050	
November 3	at UCF		Florida Citrus Bowl; Orlando, FL	L 6–28	14,107	
November 10	No. 16 North Carolina A&T		Willard May Stadium; Lynchburg, VA	W 45–24		
^{†}Homecoming; Rankings from NCAA Division I-AA Football Committee Poll released prior to the game
