= 1990 Middle Tennessee Blue Raiders football team =

American college football season

1990 Middle Tennessee Blue Raiders football

OVC co-champion

NCAA Division I-AA Quarterfinal, L 13–20 at Boise State
- Conference: Ohio Valley Conference
- Record: 11–2 (5–1 OVC)
- Head coach: Boots Donnelly (12th season)
- Home stadium: Johnny "Red" Floyd Stadium

1990 Ohio Valley Conference football standings
	Conf.					Overall
Team	W		L		T	W		L		T
No. 1 Middle Tennessee +^	5	–	1	–	0	11	–	2	–	0
No. 5 Eastern Kentucky +^	5	–	1	–	0	10	–	2	–	0
Tennessee State	4	–	2	–	0	7	–	4	–	0
Tennessee Tech	3	–	3	–	0	6	–	5	–	0
Morehead State	3	–	3	–	0	5	–	6	–	0
Murray State	1	–	5	–	0	2	–	9	–	0
Austin Peay	0	–	6	–	0	0	–	11	–	0
+ – Conference co-champions; ^ – NCAA Division I-AA playoff participant; Tennessee State's game against Jackson State and Morehead State's game against Western Kentucky were designated as conference games and counted in the OVC standings.; Rankings from NCAA Division I-AA Football Committee poll

The 1990 Middle Tennessee Blue Raiders football team represented Middle Tennessee State University as a member of the Ohio Valley Conference (OVC) during the 1990 NCAA Division I-AA football season. The team was led by 12th-year head coach Boots Donnelly and played their home games at Johnny "Red" Floyd Stadium in Murfreesboro, Tennessee. The Blue Raiders finished the season with an 11–2 record overall and a 5–1 record in conference play.

== Schedule ==
Date	Opponent	Rank	Site	Result	Attendance	Source
September 1	at Tennessee State	No. 11	Vanderbilt Stadium; Nashville, TN	W 38–6	25,000	
September 8	No. 1 Georgia Southern*	No. 11	Johnny "Red" Floyd Stadium; Murfreesboro, TN	W 16–13	15,000	
September 15	East Tennessee State*	No. 11	Johnny "Red" Floyd Stadium; Murfreesboro, TN	W 48–14	12,000	
September 22	No. 14 Western Kentucky*	No. 2	Johnny "Red" Floyd Stadium; Murfreesboro, TN	W 20–7	14,000	
September 29	at Chattanooga	No. 1	Chamberlain Field; Chattanooga, TN	W 24–17	8,229	
October 6	No. 4 Eastern Kentucky	No. 1	Johnny "Red" Floyd Stadium; Murfreesboro, TN	L 7–10		
October 13	Tennessee–Martin*	No. 5	Johnny "Red" Floyd Stadium; Murfreesboro, TN	W 65–17	9,500	
October 20	at Austin Peay	No. 4	Clarksville Municipal Stadium; Clarksville, TN	W 56–7	5,330	
October 27	Morehead State	No. 4	Johnny "Red" Floyd Stadium; Murfreesboro, TN	W 37–0		
November 10	at Murray State	No. 3	Roy Stewart Stadium; Murray, KY	W 31–10		
November 17	Tennessee Tech	No. 2	Johnny "Red" Floyd Stadium; Murfreesboro, TN	W 42–0		
November 24	No. 16 Jackson State*	No. 1	Johnny "Red" Floyd Stadium; Murfreesboro, TN (NCAA Division I-AA First Round)	W 28–7		
December 1	at No. 10 Boise State*	No. 1	Bronco Stadium; Boise, ID (NCAA Division I-AA Quarterfinal)	L 13–20	15,849	
*Non-conference game; Rankings from NCAA Division I-AA Football Committee Poll released prior to the game

== After the season ==
=== NFL draft ===
The following Blue Raider was selected in the 1991 NFL draft following the season.

Round	Pick	Player	Position	NFL club
8	207	Marty Carter	Defensive back	Tampa Bay Buccaneers
