= 1990 William & Mary Tribe football team =

American college football season

1990 William & Mary Tribe football

Lambert Cup winner

NCAA Division I-AA Quarterfinal, L 38–52 at UCF
- Conference: Independent
- Record: 10–3
- Head coach: Jimmye Laycock (11th season)
- Captains: Alan Garlic; Brad Uhl; Mac Partlow; Reggie White; Tyrone Shelton
- Home stadium: Zable Stadium

1990 NCAA Division I-AA independents football standings
	Conf.			Overall
Team	W	L	T	W		L		T
No. 2 Youngstown State ^		–		11	–	1	–	0
No. 7 William & Mary ^		–		10	–	2	–	0
No. 3 Georgia Southern ^		–		9	–	3	–	0
No. 18 UCF ^		–		9	–	3	–	0
Liberty		–		7	–	4	–	0
Samford		–		6	–	4	–	1
James Madison		–		5	–	6	–	0
Nicholls State		–		5	–	6	–	0
Arkansas State		–		3	–	7	–	1
Western Kentucky		–		2	–	8	–	0
Towson State		–		2	–	9	–	0
Northeastern		–		1	–	10	–	0
^ – NCAA Division I-AA playoff participant; Rankings from NCAA Division I-AA Football Committee poll

The 1990 William & Mary Tribe football team represented the College of William & Mary as an independent during the 1990 NCAA Division I-AA football season. Led by Jimmye Laycock in his 11th year as head coach, William & Mary finished the season with a record of 10–3 and ranked No. 7 in the final NCAA Division I-AA Football Committee poll. The Tribe qualified for the NCAA Division I-AA playoffs, beating UMass in the first round before losing to UCF in the quarterfinals.

== Schedule ==
Date	Opponent	Rank	Site	Result	Attendance	Source
September 8	at No. 20 The Citadel	No. 10	Johnson Hagood Stadium; Charleston, SC	L 31–34	18,011	
September 15	Villanova	No. 10	Zable Stadium; Williamsburg, VA	W 37–14	9,728	
September 22	Connecticut		Zable Stadium; Williamsburg, VA	W 24–7	11,831	
September 29	at No. 7 (I-A) Virginia	No. T–20	Scott Stadium; Charlottesville, VA	L 35–63	40,400	
October 6	at Delaware		Delaware Stadium; Newark, DE (rivalry)	W 22–12	21,378	
October 13	vs. VMI	No. 16	Foreman Field; Norfolk, VA (Oyster Bowl, rivalry)	W 59–47	19,000	
October 20	No. 20 Bucknell	No. 14	Zable Stadium; Williamsburg, VA	W 45–17	9,821	
October 27	Lehigh	No. 11	Zable Stadium; Williamsburg, VA	W 38–17	8,925	
November 3	No. 7 Furman	No. 10	Zable Stadium; Williamsburg, VA	W 38–28	15,000	
November 10	at James Madison	No. 9	Bridgeforth Stadium; Harrisonburg, VA (rivalry)	W 31–21		
November 17	at Richmond	No. 9	UR Stadium; Richmond, VA (rivalry)	W 31–10	15,823	
November 24	No. 9 UMass	No. 7	Zable Stadium; Williamsburg, VA (NCAA Division I-AA First Round)	W 38–0	7,027	
December 1	at No. 10 UCF	No. 7	Florida Citrus Bowl; Orlando, FL (NCAA Division I-AA Quarterfinal)	L 38–52	20,067	
Rankings from NCAA Division I-AA Football Committee Poll released prior to the game
