= 1990 Tennessee Tech Golden Eagles football team =

American college football season

1990 Tennessee Tech Golden Eagles football
- Conference: Ohio Valley Conference
- Record: 6–5 (3–3 OVC)
- Head coach: Jim Ragland (5th season)
- Home stadium: Tucker Stadium

1990 Ohio Valley Conference football standings
	Conf.					Overall
Team	W		L		T	W		L		T
No. 1 Middle Tennessee +^	5	–	1	–	0	11	–	2	–	0
No. 5 Eastern Kentucky +^	5	–	1	–	0	10	–	2	–	0
Tennessee State	4	–	2	–	0	7	–	4	–	0
Tennessee Tech	3	–	3	–	0	6	–	5	–	0
Morehead State	3	–	3	–	0	5	–	6	–	0
Murray State	1	–	5	–	0	2	–	9	–	0
Austin Peay	0	–	6	–	0	0	–	11	–	0
+ – Conference co-champions; ^ – NCAA Division I-AA playoff participant; Rankings from NCAA Division I-AA Football Committee poll

The 1990 Tennessee Tech Golden Eagles football team represented Tennessee Technological University (commonly referred to as Tennessee Tech) as a member of the Ohio Valley Conference (OVC) during the 1990 NCAA Division I-AA football season. Led by fifth-year head coach Jim Ragland, the Golden Eagles compiled an overall record of 6–5, with a mark of 3–3 in conference play, and finished tied for fourth in the OVC.

== Schedule ==
Date	Opponent	Site	Result	Attendance	Source
September 1	Lock Haven*	Tucker Stadium; Cookeville, TN	W 45–14		
September 8	Chattanooga*	Tucker Stadium; Cookeville, TN	L 17–40	7,023	
September 15	Samford*	Tucker Stadium; Cookeville, TN	W 21–7	8,100	
September 22	at Ohio*	Peden Stadium; Athens, OH	L 32–42	14,666	
September 29	at Murray State	Roy Stewart Stadium; Murray, KY	W 16–3	5,043	
October 6	Morehead State	Tucker Stadium; Cookeville, TN	W 24–7	5,012	
October 13	Western Kentucky*	Tucker Stadium; Cookeville, TN	W 33–22	11,183	
October 27	at No. 1 Eastern Kentucky	Hanger Field; Richmond, KY	L 20–29		
November 3	at Tennessee State	Hale Stadium; Nashville, TN	L 14–36		
November 10	at Austin Peay	Municipal Stadium; Clarksville, TN	W 20–14 ^{OT}	1,324	
November 17	at No. 2 Middle Tennessee	Johnny "Red" Floyd Stadium; Murfreesboro, TN	L 0–42		
*Non-conference game; Rankings from NCAA Division I-AA Football Committee Poll released prior to the game
