= 1990 Connecticut Huskies football team =

American college football season

1990 Connecticut Huskies football
- Conference: Yankee Conference
- Record: 6–5 (5–3 Yankee)
- Head coach: Tom Jackson (8th season)
- Home stadium: Memorial Stadium

1990 Yankee Conference football standings
	Conf.					Overall
Team	W		L		T	W		L		T
No. 9 UMass $^	7	–	1	–	0	8	–	2	–	1
No. T–19 New Hampshire	5	–	3	–	0	7	–	3	–	1
Delaware	5	–	3	–	0	6	–	5	–	0
Connecticut	5	–	3	–	0	6	–	5	–	0
Villanova	5	–	3	–	0	6	–	5	–	0
Boston University	4	–	4	–	0	5	–	6	–	0
Maine	2	–	6	–	0	3	–	8	–	0
Rhode Island	2	–	6	–	0	5	–	6	–	0
Richmond	1	–	7	–	0	1	–	10	–	0
$ – Conference champion; ^ – NCAA Division I-AA playoff participant; Rankings from NCAA Division I-AA Football Committee poll

The 1990 Connecticut Huskies football team represented the University of Connecticut in the 1990 NCAA Division I-AA football season. The Huskies were led by eighth-year head coach Tom Jackson, and completed the season with a record of 6–5.

== Schedule ==
Date	Opponent	Rank	Site	Result	Attendance	Source
September 8	New Hampshire	No. 8	Memorial Stadium; Storrs, CT	L 16–21	9,214	
September 15	at North Carolina*		Kenan Memorial Stadium; Chapel Hill, NC	L 21–48	41,000	
September 22	at William & Mary*		Zable Stadium; Williamsburg, VA	L 7–24	11,831	
September 29	at Yale*		Yale Bowl; New Haven, CT	W 44–7	18,859	
October 6	Villanova		Memorial Stadium; Storrs, CT	W 24–22	13,248	
October 13	at No. 9 UMass		Warren McGuirk Alumni Stadium; Amherst, MA (rivalry)	L 19–38	2,459	
October 20	Maine		Memorial Stadium; Storrs, CT	W 35–20	8,421	
October 27	Richmond		Memorial Stadium; Storrs, CT	W 42–24	7,842	
November 3	at Delaware		Delaware Stadium; Newark, DE	L 21–35		
November 10	at Boston University		Nickerson Field; Boston, MA	W 28–21		
November 17	Rhode Island		Memorial Stadium; Storrs, CT (rivalry)	W 51–21	6,215	
*Non-conference game; Rankings from NCAA Division I-AA Football Committee Poll released prior to the game
