= 1990 Northeastern Huskies football team =

American college football season

1990 Northeastern Huskies football
- Conference: Independent
- Record: 1–10
- Head coach: Paul Pawlak (10th season)
- Home stadium: Parsons Field

1990 NCAA Division I-AA independents football standings
	Conf.			Overall
Team	W	L	T	W		L		T
No. 2 Youngstown State ^		–		11	–	1	–	0
No. 7 William & Mary ^		–		10	–	2	–	0
No. 3 Georgia Southern ^		–		9	–	3	–	0
No. 18 UCF ^		–		9	–	3	–	0
Liberty		–		7	–	4	–	0
Samford		–		6	–	4	–	1
James Madison		–		5	–	6	–	0
Nicholls State		–		5	–	6	–	0
Arkansas State		–		3	–	7	–	1
Western Kentucky		–		2	–	8	–	0
Towson State		–		2	–	9	–	0
Northeastern		–		1	–	10	–	0
^ – NCAA Division I-AA playoff participant; Rankings from NCAA Division I-AA Football Committee poll

The 1990 Northeastern Huskies football team was an American football team that represented Northeastern University as an independent during the 1990 NCAA Division I-AA football season. Led by 10th-year head coach Paul Pawlak, the team compiled a 1–10 record.

== Schedule ==
Date	Opponent	Site	Result	Attendance	Source
September 8	vs. Delaware State	Baynard Stadium; Wilmington, DE (Wilmington Classic)	L 16–43	5,263	
September 15	No. 13 Youngstown State	Parsons Field; Brookline, MA	L 3–37	1,650	
September 22	at Harvard	Harvard Stadium; Boston, MA	L 0–26	9,200	
September 29	Lock Haven	Parsons Field; Brookline, MA	W 52–6	2,120	
October 6	at James Madison	Bridgeforth Stadium; Harrisonburg, VA	L 0–21		
October 13	Lehigh	Parsons Field; Brookline, MA	L 13–28	2,025	
October 20	at No. 5 New Hampshire	Cowell Stadium; Durham, NH	L 7–59		
October 27	at No. 8 UMass	McGuirk Stadium; Hadley, MA	L 21–28	8,810	
November 3	Rhode Island	Parsons Field; Brookline, MA	L 11–31	6,200	
November 10	at Maine	Alumni Field; Orono, ME	L 7–42	2,615	
November 17	at Towson State	Minnegan Stadium; Towson, MD	L 14–21		
Rankings from NCAA Division I-AA Football Committee Poll released prior to the game
