= 1990 Richmond Spiders football team =

American college football season

1990 Richmond Spiders football
- Conference: Yankee Conference
- Record: 1–10 (1–7 Yankee)
- Head coach: Jim Marshall (2nd season)
- Home stadium: UR Stadium

1990 Yankee Conference football standings
	Conf.					Overall
Team	W		L		T	W		L		T
No. 9 UMass $^	7	–	1	–	0	8	–	2	–	1
No. T–19 New Hampshire	5	–	3	–	0	7	–	3	–	1
Delaware	5	–	3	–	0	6	–	5	–	0
Connecticut	5	–	3	–	0	6	–	5	–	0
Villanova	5	–	3	–	0	6	–	5	–	0
Boston University	4	–	4	–	0	5	–	6	–	0
Maine	2	–	6	–	0	3	–	8	–	0
Rhode Island	2	–	6	–	0	5	–	6	–	0
Richmond	1	–	7	–	0	1	–	10	–	0
$ – Conference champion; ^ – NCAA Division I-AA playoff participant; Rankings from NCAA Division I-AA Football Committee poll

The 1990 Richmond Spiders football team was an American football team that represented the University of Richmond as a member of the Yankee Conference during the 1990 NCAA Division I-AA football season. In their second season under head coach Jim Marshall, Richmond compiled a 1–10 record, with a mark of 1–7 in conference play, finishing in ninth place in the Yankee.

== Schedule ==
Date	Opponent	Site	Result	Attendance	Source
September 8	at Navy*	Navy–Marine Corps Memorial Stadium; Annapolis, MD	L 17–28	23,161	
September 15	at Rhode Island	Meade Stadium; Kingston, RI	L 0–37	5,321	
September 22	James Madison*	UR Stadium; Richmond, VA (rivalry)	L 0–29	7,713	
September 29	Maine	UR Stadium; Richmond, VA	W 24–16	8,543	
October 6	No. T–6 New Hampshire	UR Stadium; Richmond, VA	L 0–19		
October 13	at Boston University	Nickerson Field; Boston, MA	L 14–28	1,118	
October 19	at Villanova	Villanova Stadium; Villanova, PA	L 10–24	9,107	
October 27	at Connecticut	Memorial Stadium; Storrs, CT	L 24–42	7,842	
November 3	No. 8 UMass	UR Stadium; Richmond, VA	L 9–26	7,012	
November 10	Delaware	UR Stadium; Richmond, VA	L 25–35	5,090	
November 17	No. 9 William & Mary*	UR Stadium; Richmond, VA (rivalry)	L 10–31	15,823	
*Non-conference game; Rankings from NCAA Division I-AA Football Committee Poll released prior to the game
