= Billy Taylor (American football coach) =

American football coach (born 1964)

Current position
- Title: Head coach
- Team: Tusculum
- Conference: SAC
- Record: 2–18

Biographical details
- Born: April 17, 1964 (age 62); Warren, Ohio, U.S.
- Education: East Tennessee State University (1988); University of Southern Mississippi (1991)

Playing career
- 1983–1987: East Tennessee State
- Position: Outside linebacker

Coaching career (HC unless noted)
- 1989–1990: Southern Miss (GA)
- 1991–1996: Wofford (RC/LB)
- 1997–2001: East Tennessee State (RC/LB)
- 2002–2003: East Tennessee State (DC/LB)
- 2004: Elon (DC/ILB)
- 2005–2007: Chattanooga (DC/ILB)
- 2008: Tennessee Tech (DC/ILB)
- 2009–2012: Tennessee Tech (AHC/DC/RC/ILB)
- 2013–2023: East Tennessee State (AHC/DC)
- 2024–present: Tusculum

Head coaching record
- Overall: 2–18

William Taylor (born April 17, 1964) is an American college football coach. He is the head football coach for Tusculum University, a position he has held since 2024. He also coached for Southern Miss, Wofford, East Tennessee State, Elon, Chattanooga, and Tennessee Tech. He played college football for East Tennessee State as an outside linebacker.

== Head coaching record ==
Year	Team	Overall	Conference	Standing	Bowl/playoffs
Tusculum Pioneers (South Atlantic Conference) (2024–present)
2024	Tusculum	1–9	1–8	T–5th (Mountain)	
2025	Tusculum	1–9	0–8	10th	
2026	Tusculum	0–0	0–0		
Tusculum:		2–18	1–16		
Total:		2–18			
