= 1990 Delaware Fightin' Blue Hens football team =

American college football season

1990 Delaware Fightin' Blue Hens football
- Conference: Yankee Conference
- Record: 6–5 (5–3 Yankee)
- Head coach: Tubby Raymond (25th season)
- Offensive coordinator: Ted Kempski (23rd season)
- Offensive scheme: Delaware Wing-T
- Base defense: 5–2
- Home stadium: Delaware Stadium

1990 Yankee Conference football standings
	Conf.					Overall
Team	W		L		T	W		L		T
No. 9 UMass $^	7	–	1	–	0	8	–	2	–	1
No. T–19 New Hampshire	5	–	3	–	0	7	–	3	–	1
Delaware	5	–	3	–	0	6	–	5	–	0
Connecticut	5	–	3	–	0	6	–	5	–	0
Villanova	5	–	3	–	0	6	–	5	–	0
Boston University	4	–	4	–	0	5	–	6	–	0
Maine	2	–	6	–	0	3	–	8	–	0
Rhode Island	2	–	6	–	0	5	–	6	–	0
Richmond	1	–	7	–	0	1	–	10	–	0
$ – Conference champion; ^ – NCAA Division I-AA playoff participant; Rankings from NCAA Division I-AA Football Committee poll

The 1990 Delaware Fightin' Blue Hens football team represented the University of Delaware as a member of the Yankee Conference during the 1990 NCAA Division I-AA football season. Led by 25th-year head coach Tubby Raymond, the Fightin' Blue Hens compiled an overall record of 6–5 with a mark of 5–3 in conference play, placing in a four-way tie for second in the Yankee Conference. The team played home games at Delaware Stadium in Newark, Delaware.

== Schedule ==
Date	Opponent	Site	Result	Attendance	Source
September 8	Boston University	Delaware Stadium; Newark, DE	W 34–20	15,024	
September 15	at New Hampshire	Cowell Stadium; Durham, NH	L 7–34	6,385	
September 22	West Chester*	Delaware Stadium; Newark, DE (rivalry)	W 13–12	16,483	
September 29	Rhode Island	Delaware Stadium; Newark, DE	W 24–19	12,341	
October 6	William & Mary*^{†}	Delaware Stadium; Newark, DE (rivalry)	L 12–22	21,378	
October 13	at Villanova	Villanova Stadium; Villanova, PA (Battle of the Blue)	W 19–15	8,850	
October 20	No. 8 UMass	Delaware Stadium; Newark, DE	L 3–17	22,184	
October 27	at Maine	Alumni Field; Orono, ME	L 10–17		
November 3	Connecticut	Delaware Stadium; Newark, DE	W 35–21		
November 10	at Richmond	UR Stadium; Richmond, VA	W 35–25	5,090	
November 17	at Navy*	Navy–Marine Corps Memorial Stadium; Annapolis, MD	L 27–31	25,284	
*Non-conference game; ^{†}Homecoming; Rankings from NCAA Division I-AA Football Committee Poll released prior to the game
