= 1990 Austin Peay Governors football team =

American college football season

1990 Austin Peay Governors football
- Conference: Ohio Valley Conference
- Record: 0–11 (0–6 OVC)
- Head coach: John Palermo (1st season)
- Home stadium: Municipal Stadium

1990 Ohio Valley Conference football standings
	Conf.					Overall
Team	W		L		T	W		L		T
No. 1 Middle Tennessee +^	5	–	1	–	0	11	–	2	–	0
No. 5 Eastern Kentucky +^	5	–	1	–	0	10	–	2	–	0
Tennessee State	4	–	2	–	0	7	–	4	–	0
Tennessee Tech	3	–	3	–	0	6	–	5	–	0
Morehead State	3	–	3	–	0	5	–	6	–	0
Murray State	1	–	5	–	0	2	–	9	–	0
Austin Peay	0	–	6	–	0	0	–	11	–	0
+ – Conference co-champions; ^ – NCAA Division I-AA playoff participant; Rankings from NCAA Division I-AA Football Committee poll

The 1990 Austin Peay Governors football team represented Austin Peay State University as a member of the Ohio Valley Conference (OVC) during the 1990 NCAA Division I-AA football season. Led by first-year head coach John Palermo, the Governors compiled an overall record of 0–11, with a mark of 0–6 in conference play, and finished seventh in the OVC.

== Schedule ==
Date	Opponent	Site	Result	Attendance	Source
September 8	Tennessee–Martin*	Municipal Stadium; Clarksville, TN	L 10–24	6,893	
September 15	at Temple*	Veterans Stadium; Philadelphia, PA	L 0–28	24,785	
September 22	at No. 6 Southwest Missouri State*	Briggs Stadium; Springfield, MO	L 7–34	10,100	
September 29	at Samford*	Seibert Stadium; Homewood, AL	L 9–28	5,519	
October 6	Tennessee State	Municipal Stadium; Clarksville, TN	L 7–33	8,058	
October 13	at Morehead State	Jayne Stadium; Morehead, KY	L 7–34	6,700	
October 20	No. 4 Middle Tennessee	Municipal Stadium; Clarksville, TN	L 7–56	5,330	
October 27	at Illinois State*	Hancock Stadium; Normal, IL	L 9–13		
November 3	No. 1 Eastern Kentucky	Municipal Stadium; Clarksville, TN	L 14–38	2,068	
November 10	Tennessee Tech	Municipal Stadium; Clarksville, TN	L 14–20 ^{OT}	1,324	
November 17	Murray State	Municipal Stadium; Clarksville, TN	L 24–31		
*Non-conference game; Rankings from NCAA Division I-AA Football Committee Poll released prior to the game
