= 1990 Appalachian State Mountaineers football team =

American college football season

1990 Appalachian State Mountaineers football
- Conference: Southern Conference
- Record: 6–5 (5–2 SoCon)
- Head coach: Jerry Moore (2nd season)
- Home stadium: Kidd Brewer Stadium

1990 Southern Conference football standings
| | Conf. | | | | | Overall |
| Team | W | | L | | T | W | | L | | T |
|---|---|---|---|---|---|---|---|---|---|---|
| No. 12 Furman $^ | 6 | – | 1 | – | 0 | 9 | – | 4 | – | 0 |
| Appalachian State | 5 | – | 2 | – | 0 | 6 | – | 5 | – | 0 |
| Chattanooga | 4 | – | 2 | – | 0 | 6 | – | 5 | – | 0 |
| No. 15 The Citadel ^ | 4 | – | 3 | – | 0 | 7 | – | 5 | – | 0 |
| Marshall | 4 | – | 3 | – | 0 | 6 | – | 5 | – | 0 |
| Western Carolina | 2 | – | 5 | – | 0 | 3 | – | 8 | – | 0 |
| VMI | 1 | – | 5 | – | 0 | 4 | – | 7 | – | 0 |
| East Tennessee State | 1 | – | 6 | – | 0 | 2 | – | 9 | – | 0 |
$ – Conference champion; ^ – NCAA Division I-AA playoff participant; Rankings from NCAA Division I-AA Football Committee poll

The 1990 Appalachian State Mountaineers football team was an American football team that represented Appalachian State University as a member of the Southern Conference (SoCon) during the 1990 NCAA Division I-AA football season. In their second year under head coach Jerry Moore, the Mountaineers compiled an overall record of 6–5 with a conference mark of 5–2.

== Schedule ==
| Date | Opponent | Rank | Site | Result | Attendance | Source |
|---|---|---|---|---|---|---|
| September 1 | East Tennessee State | | Kidd Brewer Stadium; Boone, NC | W 34–24 | 14,830 | |
| September 8 | at Wake Forest* | | Groves Stadium; Winston-Salem, NC | L 12–23 | 28,732 | |
| September 22 | at No. 17 (I-A) Clemson* | No. 16 | Memorial Stadium; Clemson, SC | L 0–48 | 77,716 | |
| September 29 | No. 9 The Citadel | | Kidd Brewer Stadium; Boone, NC | W 27–9 | 18,281 | |
| October 6 | at NC State* | | Carter–Finley Stadium; Raleigh, NC | L 0–56 | 46,000 | |
| October 13 | No. 9 Furman | | Kidd Brewer Stadium; Boone, NC | L 7–30 | 13,842 | |
| October 20 | Western Carolina | | Kidd Brewer Stadium; Boone, NC (rivalry) | W 27–9 | 21,412 | |
| October 27 | at No. 20 Chattanooga | | Chamberlain Field; Chattanooga, TN | W 23–17 | 7,527 | |
| November 3 | at Marshall | | Fairfield Stadium; Huntington, WV (rivalry) | L 0–50 | 12,047 | |
| November 10 | at VMI | | Alumni Memorial Field; Lexington, VA | W 17–0 | 4,463 | |
| November 17 | at James Madison* | | Bridgeforth Stadium; Harrisonburg, VA | W 24–0 | 3,786 | |
*Non-conference game; Rankings from NCAA Division I-AA Football Committee Poll released prior to the game
