= 1990 Western Carolina Catamounts football team =

American college football season

1990 Western Carolina Catamounts football
- Conference: Southern Conference
- Record: 3–8 (2–5 SoCon)
- Head coach: Steve Hodgin (1st season)
- Home stadium: E. J. Whitmire Stadium

1990 Southern Conference football standings
	Conf.					Overall
Team	W		L		T	W		L		T
No. 12 Furman $^	6	–	1	–	0	9	–	4	–	0
Appalachian State	5	–	2	–	0	6	–	5	–	0
Chattanooga	4	–	2	–	0	6	–	5	–	0
No. 15 The Citadel ^	4	–	3	–	0	7	–	5	–	0
Marshall	4	–	3	–	0	6	–	5	–	0
Western Carolina	2	–	5	–	0	3	–	8	–	0
VMI	1	–	5	–	0	4	–	7	–	0
East Tennessee State	1	–	6	–	0	2	–	9	–	0
$ – Conference champion; ^ – NCAA Division I-AA playoff participant; Rankings from NCAA Division I-AA Football Committee poll

The 1990 Western Carolina Catamounts team was an American football team that represented Western Carolina University as a member of the Southern Conference (SoCon) during the 1990 NCAA Division I-AA football season. In their first year under head coach Steve Hodgin, the team compiled an overall record of 3–8, with a mark of 2–5 in conference play, and finished sixth in the SoCon.

== Schedule ==
Date	Opponent	Site	Result	Attendance	Source
September 1	at NC State*	Carter–Finley Stadium; Raleigh, NC	L 0–67	42,700	
September 8	VMI	E. J. Whitmire Stadium; Cullowhee, NC	W 28–20	6,752	
September 15	at North Carolina A&T*	Aggie Stadium; Greensboro, NC	L 19–40		
September 22	East Tennessee State	E. J. Whitmire Stadium; Cullowhee, NC	W 21–17	5,928	
September 29	Mars Hill*	E. J. Whitmire Stadium; Cullowhee, NC	W 20–7		
October 6	No. 18 The Citadel	Whitmire Stadium; Cullowhee, NC	L 10–28	11,148	
October 13	at Duke*	Wallace Wade Stadium; Durham, NC	L 18–49	15,700	
October 20	at Appalachian State	Kidd Brewer Stadium; Boone, NC (rivalry)	L 9–27	21,412	
October 27	at No. 8 Furman	Paladin Stadium; Greenville, SC	L 9–42	14,910	
November 3	at Chattanooga	Chamberlain Field; Chattanooga, TN	L 21–23	5,203	
November 17	Marshall	Whitmire Stadium; Cullowhee, NC	L 14–42	9,626	
*Non-conference game; Rankings from NCAA Division I-AA Football Committee Poll released prior to the game
