= 1990 Georgia Southern Eagles football team =

American college football season

1990 Georgia Southern Eagles football

NCAA Division I-AA champion

NCAA Division I-AA Championship, W 36–13 vs. Nevada
- Conference: Independent
- Record: 12–3
- Head coach: Tim Stowers (1st season)
- Co-defensive coordinators: Jeff McInerney (1st season); Tommy Spangler (1st season)
- Home stadium: Paulson Stadium

1990 NCAA Division I-AA independents football standings
	Conf.			Overall
Team	W	L	T	W		L		T
No. 2 Youngstown State ^		–		11	–	1	–	0
No. 7 William & Mary ^		–		10	–	2	–	0
No. 3 Georgia Southern ^		–		9	–	3	–	0
No. 18 UCF ^		–		9	–	3	–	0
Liberty		–		7	–	4	–	0
Samford		–		6	–	4	–	1
James Madison		–		5	–	6	–	0
Nicholls State		–		5	–	6	–	0
Arkansas State		–		3	–	7	–	1
Western Kentucky		–		2	–	8	–	0
Towson State		–		2	–	9	–	0
Northeastern		–		1	–	10	–	0
^ – NCAA Division I-AA playoff participant; Rankings from NCAA Division I-AA Football Committee poll

The 1990 Georgia Southern Eagles football team represented Georgia Southern University as an independent during the 1990 NCAA Division I-AA football season. Georgia Southern was led by first-year head football coach Tim Stowers and played their home games at Paulson Stadium.

The Eagles won the national championship for the second consecutive season—their fourth overall in six years—and it was their third straight national championship game appearance. Georgia Southern defeated Nevada, 36–13, in their home stadium to claim the championship.

== Schedule ==
Date	Time	Opponent	Rank	Site	TV	Result	Attendance	Source
September 1		Valdosta State	No. 1	Paulson Stadium; Statesboro, GA		W 17–10	15,180	
September 8		at No. 4 Middle Tennessee	No. 1	Johnny "Red" Floyd Stadium; Murfreesboro, TN		L 13–16	15,000	
September 15	7:00 p.m	at No. 3 (I-A) Florida State	No. 6	Doak Campbell Stadium; Tallahassee, FL	PPV	L 6–48	62,111	
September 22		No. 3 Eastern Kentucky	No. 9	Paulson Stadium; Statesboro, GA		L 34–42	17,373	
September 29		No. 15 Northeast Louisiana	No. 17	Paulson Stadium; Statesboro, GA		W 33–14	16,048	
October 6		at No. 11 Marshall	No. 14	Fairfield Stadium; Huntington, WV	GSSN	W 17–14	17,039	
October 20		at UCF	No. 12	Citrus Bowl; Orlando, FL	GSSN	W 38–17	16,258	
October 27		Savannah State	No. 12	Paulson Stadium; Statesboro, GA		W 54–7	19,331	
November 3		James Madison	No. 9	Paulson Stadium; Statesboro, GA	GSSN	W 31–13	21,067	
November 10		at Chattanooga	No. 7	Chamberlain Field; Chattanooga, TN	GSSN	W 23–20	5,710	
November 17		Samford	No. 6	Paulson Stadium; Statesboro, GA		W 31–24	18,271	
November 24		No. 15 The Citadel	No. 3	Paulson Stadium; Statesboro, GA (NCAA Division I-AA First Round)		W 31–0	11,881	
December 1	12:30 p.m.	No. 13 Idaho	No. 3	Paulson Stadium; Statesboro, GA (NCAA Division I-AA Quarterfinal)		W 28–27	11,571	
December 8		No. 18 UCF	No. 3	Paulson Stadium; Statesboro, GA (NCAA Division I-AA Semifinal)		W 44–7	13,183	
December 15		No. 4 Nevada	No. 3	Paulson Stadium; Statesboro, GA (NCAA Division I-AA Championship Game)	CBS	W 36–13	23,204	
Rankings from NCAA Division I-AA Football Committee Poll released prior to the game; All times are in Eastern time
