= 1990 Boston University Terriers football team =

American college football season

1990 Boston University Terriers football
- Conference: Yankee Conference
- Record: 5–6 (4–4 Yankee)
- Head coach: Dan Allen (1st season)
- Offensive coordinator: Tony Sparano (2nd season)
- Defensive coordinator: Chris Rippon (1st season)
- Home stadium: Nickerson Field

1990 Yankee Conference football standings
	Conf.					Overall
Team	W		L		T	W		L		T
No. 9 UMass $^	7	–	1	–	0	8	–	2	–	1
No. T–19 New Hampshire	5	–	3	–	0	7	–	3	–	1
Delaware	5	–	3	–	0	6	–	5	–	0
Connecticut	5	–	3	–	0	6	–	5	–	0
Villanova	5	–	3	–	0	6	–	5	–	0
Boston University	4	–	4	–	0	5	–	6	–	0
Maine	2	–	6	–	0	3	–	8	–	0
Rhode Island	2	–	6	–	0	5	–	6	–	0
Richmond	1	–	7	–	0	1	–	10	–	0
$ – Conference champion; ^ – NCAA Division I-AA playoff participant; Rankings from NCAA Division I-AA Football Committee poll

The 1990 Boston University Terriers football team was an American football team that represented Boston University as a member of the Yankee Conference during the 1990 NCAA Division I-AA football season. In their first season under head coach Dan Allen, the Terriers compiled a 5–6 record (4–4 against conference opponents), finished sixth in the Yankee Conference, and were outscored by a total of 273 to 246.

== Schedule ==
Date	Opponent	Site	Result	Attendance	Source
September 1	No. 16 Colgate	Nickerson Field; Boston, MA	L 10–21	4,429	
September 8	at Delaware	Delaware Stadium; Newark, DE	L 20–34	15,024	
September 15	No. 9 (D-II) West Chester	Nickerson Field; Boston, MA	W 38–7		
September 22	at No. 17 Boise State	Bronco Stadium; Boise, ID	L 21–34	19,875	
September 29	at No. 19 UMass	McGuirk Stadium; Hadley, MA	L 16–47	8,247	
October 13	Richmond	Nickerson Field; Boston, MA	W 28–14	1,118	
October 20	at Rhode Island	Meade Stadium; Kingston, RI	W 15–13	10,228	
October 27	No. 5 New Hampshire	Nickerson Field; Boston, MA	W 41–24		
November 3	at Maine	Alumni Field; Orono, ME	W 26–24	6,726	
November 10	Connecticut	Nickerson Field; Boston, MA	L 21–28		
November 17	Villanova	Nickerson Field; Boston, MA	L 10–27	2,692	
Rankings from NCAA Division I-AA Football Committee Poll released prior to the game
