= 1990 Marshall Thundering Herd football team =

American college football season

1990 Marshall Thundering Herd football
- Conference: Southern Conference
- Record: 6–5 (4–3 SoCon)
- Head coach: Jim Donnan (1st season)
- Offensive coordinator: Joe Dickinson (1st season)
- Defensive coordinator: Mickey Matthews (1st season)
- Captains: Don Mahoney; Eric Ihnat; Eric Gates; Derek Grier
- Home stadium: Fairfield Stadium

1990 Southern Conference football standings
	Conf.					Overall
Team	W		L		T	W		L		T
No. 12 Furman $^	6	–	1	–	0	9	–	4	–	0
Appalachian State	5	–	2	–	0	6	–	5	–	0
Chattanooga	4	–	2	–	0	6	–	5	–	0
No. 15 The Citadel ^	4	–	3	–	0	7	–	5	–	0
Marshall	4	–	3	–	0	6	–	5	–	0
Western Carolina	2	–	5	–	0	3	–	8	–	0
VMI	1	–	5	–	0	4	–	7	–	0
East Tennessee State	1	–	6	–	0	2	–	9	–	0
$ – Conference champion; ^ – NCAA Division I-AA playoff participant; Rankings from NCAA Division I-AA Football Committee poll

The 1990 Marshall Thundering Herd football team was an American football team that represented Marshall University as a member of the Southern Conference (SoCon) during the 1990 NCAA Division I-AA football season. Led by first-year head coach Jim Donnan, the Thundering Herd compiled an overall record of 6–5 with a mark of 4–3 in conference play, tying for fourth place in the SoCon. The team played home games at Fairfield Stadium in Huntington, West Virginia.

== Schedule ==
Date	Opponent	Rank	Site	Result	Attendance	Source
September 1	Morehead State*		Fairfield Stadium; Huntington, WV	W 28–14	16,546	
September 8	West Virginia Tech*		Fairfield Stadium; Huntington, WV	W 52–0		
September 22	at No. 11 The Citadel		Johnson Hagood Stadium; Charleston, SC	L 10–21	17,105	
September 29	No. 4 Furman		Fairfield Stadium; Huntington, WV	W 10–7		
October 6	No. 20 Georgia Southern*	No. 9	Fairfield Stadium; Huntington, WV	L 14–17	17,039	
October 13	at East Tennessee State	No. 17	Memorial Center; Johnson City, TN	L 17–38	4,422	
October 20	Chattanooga^{†}		Fairfield Stadium; Huntington, WV	L 23–29	15,581	
October 27	at VMI		Alumni Memorial Field; Lexington, VA	W 52–7	5,391	
November 3	Appalachian State		Fairfield Stadium; Huntington, WV (rivalry)	W 50–0	12,047	
November 10	No. 1 Eastern Kentucky*	No. 18	Fairfield Stadium; Huntington, WV	L 12–15	16,517	
November 17	at Western Carolina		E. J. Whitmire Stadium; Cullowhee, NC	W 42–14	9,626	
*Non-conference game; ^{†}Homecoming; Rankings from NCAA Division I-AA Football Committee Poll released prior to the game
