= 1990 Villanova Wildcats football team =

American college football season

1990 Villanova Wildcats football
- Conference: Yankee Conference
- Record: 6–5 (5–3 Yankee)
- Head coach: Andy Talley (6th season)
- Defensive coordinator: Dan MacNeill (3rd season)
- Home stadium: Villanova Stadium

1990 Yankee Conference football standings
	Conf.					Overall
Team	W		L		T	W		L		T
No. 9 UMass $^	7	–	1	–	0	8	–	2	–	1
No. T–19 New Hampshire	5	–	3	–	0	7	–	3	–	1
Delaware	5	–	3	–	0	6	–	5	–	0
Connecticut	5	–	3	–	0	6	–	5	–	0
Villanova	5	–	3	–	0	6	–	5	–	0
Boston University	4	–	4	–	0	5	–	6	–	0
Maine	2	–	6	–	0	3	–	8	–	0
Rhode Island	2	–	6	–	0	5	–	6	–	0
Richmond	1	–	7	–	0	1	–	10	–	0
$ – Conference champion; ^ – NCAA Division I-AA playoff participant; Rankings from NCAA Division I-AA Football Committee poll

The 1990 Villanova Wildcats football team was an American football team that represented the Villanova University as a member of the Yankee Conference during the 1990 NCAA Division I-AA football season. In their sixth year under head coach Andy Talley, the team compiled a 6–5 record.

== Schedule ==
Date	Opponent	Site	Result	Attendance	Source
September 7	Maine	Villanova Stadium; Villanova, PA	W 31–7	12,137	
September 15	at No. 10 William & Mary*	Zable Stadium; Williamsburg, VA	L 14–37	9,728	
September 22	at Navy*	Navy–Marine Corps Memorial Stadium; Annapolis, MD	L 21–23	21,491	
September 29	Liberty*	Villanova Stadium; Villanova, PA	W 26–14	13,125	
October 6	at Connecticut	Memorial Stadium; Storrs, CT	L 22–24	13,248	
October 13	Delaware	Villanova Stadium; Villanova, PA (rivalry)	L 15–19	8,850	
October 19	Richmond	Villanova Stadium; Villanova, PA	W 24–10	9,107	
October 27	Rhode Island	Villanova Stadium; Villanova, PA	W 14–7	9,257	
November 3	at New Hampshire	Cowell Stadium; Durham, NH	W 10–7		
November 10	at No. 5 UMass	McGuirk Stadium; Hadley, MA	L 0–3	1,100	
November 17	at Boston University	Nickerson Field; Boston, MA	W 27–10	2,692	
*Non-conference game; Rankings from NCAA Division I-AA Football Committee Poll released prior to the game
