= 1988 NCAA Division I-AA Football Championship Game =

Postseason college football game

1988 NCAA Division I-AA Football Championship
- I-AA National Championship Game
Georgia Southern Eagles	Furman Paladins
(12–2)	(12–2)
Independent	SoCon
12	17
Head coach: Erk Russell	Head coach: Jimmy Satterfield
NCAA / Seed; 2 / 2	NCAA / Seed; 4 / 4
	1	2	3	4	Total
Georgia Southern	3	0	3	6	12
Furman	7	3	7	0	17
- Date: December 17, 1988
- Season: 1988
- Stadium: Holt Arena
- Location: Pocatello, Idaho
- Favorite: Georgia Southern by 5
- Referee: Larry Farina
- Attendance: 9,714

United States TV coverage
- Network: ESPN
- Announcers: Tim Brando (play-by-play), Stan White (color)

The 1988 NCAA Division I-AA Football Championship Game was a postseason college football game between the Georgia Southern Eagles and the Furman Paladins. The game was played on December 17, 1988, at Holt Arena in Pocatello, Idaho. The culminating game of the 1988 NCAA Division I-AA football season, it was won by Furman, 17–12.

== Teams ==
The participants of the Championship Game were the finalists of the 1988 I-AA Playoffs, which began with a 16-team bracket.

=== Georgia Southern Eagles ===
Georgia Southern finished their regular season with a 9–2 record; one of their losses was to Florida State of Division I-A. Ranked second in the final NCAA I-AA in-house poll and seeded second in the tournament, the Eagles defeated The Citadel, Stephen F. Austin, and Eastern Kentucky to reach the final. This was the third appearance for Georgia Southern in a Division I-AA championship game, having won in 1985 and 1986.

=== Furman Paladins ===
Furman also finished their regular season with a 9–2 record (6–1 in conference); one of their losses was to Clemson of Division I-A. Ranked fourth in the final NCAA I-AA in-house poll and seeded fourth in the tournament, the Paladins defeated Delaware, Marshall, and top-seed Idaho to reach the final. This was the second appearance for Furman in a Division I-AA championship game, having lost to Georgia Southern in 1985.

== Game summary ==
=== Scoring summary ===
Scoring summary

Quarter	Time	Drive			Team	Scoring information	Score	
Quarter	Time	Plays	Yards	TOP	Team	Scoring information	GSC	FUR
1	7:13	9	36	4:10	GSC	55-yard field goal by David Cool	3	0
1	0:54	13	88	6:19	FUR	Greg Key 19-yard touchdown reception from Frankie DeBusk, Glenn Connally kick good	3	7
2	1:09	8	50	3:06	FUR	36-yard field goal by Connally	3	10
3	5:07	15	29	5:34	GSC	48-yard field goal by Cool	6	10
3	0:38	9	80	4:29	FUR	Dwight Sterling 5-yard touchdown run, Connally kick good	6	17
4	12:24				GSC	Mark Giles returned blocked punt 30 yards for touchdown, 2-point pass incomplete	12	17
"TOP" = time of possession. For other American football terms, see Glossary of American football.							12	17

=== Game statistics ===
	1	2	3	4	Total
Eagles	3	0	3	6	12
Paladins	7	3	7	0	17

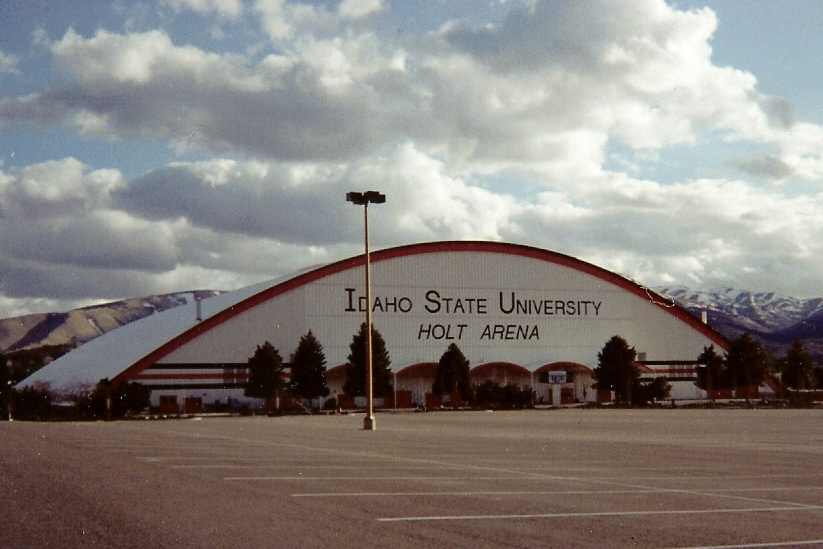
Holt Arena, site of the 1988 Division I-AA championship game

Statistics	GSC	FUR
First downs	14	17
Plays–yards	69–198	65–355
Rushes–yards	52–134	54–231
Passing yards	64	124
Passing: comp–att–int	5–17–2	7–11–1
Time of possession	26:51	33:09

Team	Category	Player	Statistics
Georgia Southern	Passing	Raymond Gross	5–17, 64 yds, 2 INT
Georgia Southern	Rushing	Joe Ross	15 car, 58 yds
Georgia Southern	Receiving	Deryl Belser	2 rec, 26 yds
Furman	Passing	Frankie DeBusk	7–11, 124 yds, 1 TD, 1 INT
Furman	Rushing	Dwight Sterling	12 car, 70 yds, 1 TD
Furman	Receiving	Donald Lipscomb	3 rec, 53 yds
