= Jerry Odom (American football) =

American football coach (born 1968)

Biographical details
- Born: November 7, 1968 (age 57); Merritt Island, Florida, U.S.
- Education: University of Florida (1991)

Playing career
- 1987–1990: Florida
- 1992–1998: Orlando Predators
- Positions: Linebacker, running back

Coaching career (HC unless noted)
- 1991: Florida (GA)
- 2000–2002: Florida (ST/LB)
- 2003–2004: East Carolina (DC/ST)
- 2005–2007: Coffee HS (GA)
- 2008–2009: Philadelphia Soul (AHC/ST)
- 2010–2015: Jacksonville (AHC)
- 2016–2023: Tusculum
- 2024–2025: Western Carolina (DC)

Head coaching record
- Overall: 42–38 (college); 22–12 (high school)

Accomplishments and honors

Championships
- 1 SAC (2020); 1 SAC Mountain Division (2023); 1 ArenaBowl (1998)

Gerald S. Odom (born November 7, 1968) is an American college football coach. He most recently was the defensive coordinator for Western Carolina University, a position he held from 2024 to 2025. He was the head football coach for Tusculum University from 2016 to 2023. He also coached for Florida, East Carolina, Jacksonville, and the Philadelphia Soul of the Arena Football League (AFL). He was the head football coach for Coffee County Central High School from 2005 to 2007. He was the head coach for Suwannee High School in 2009z He played college football for Florida and professionally for the Orlando Predators of the AFL as a linebacker and running back.

== Head coaching record ==
=== College ===
Year	Team	Overall	Conference	Standing	Bowl/playoffs
Tusculum Pioneers (South Atlantic Conference) (2016–2023)
2016	Tusculum	4–7	3–4	T–4th	
2017	Tusculum	5–5	3–4	T–4th	
2018	Tusculum	5–5	4–3	T–3rd	
2019	Tusculum	5–6	4–4	T–4th	
2020–21	Tusculum	4–1	2–0	1st (Mountain)	
2021	Tusculum	5–6	3–5	7th	
2022	Tusculum	8–3	6–3	2nd (Mountain)	
2023	Tusculum	6–5	6–2	T–1st (Mountain)	
Tusculum:		42–38	31–25		
Total:		42–38			
National championship Conference title Conference division title or championship game berth

=== High school ===
Year	Team	Overall	Conference	Standing	Bowl/playoffs
Coffee Trojans () (2005–2007)
2005	Coffee	4–6	1–4	6th	
2006	Coffee	7–2			
2007	Coffee	11–3	4–2	3rd	
Coffee:		22–12			
Total:		22–12			
