= 1990 UMass Minutemen football team =

American college football season

1990 UMass Minutemen football

Yankee Conference champion

NCAA Division I-AA First Round, L 0–38 at William & Mary
- Conference: Yankee Conference
- Record: 8–2–1 (7–1 Yankee)
- Head coach: Jim Reid (5th season)
- Home stadium: Warren McGuirk Alumni Stadium

1990 Yankee Conference football standings
	Conf.					Overall
Team	W		L		T	W		L		T
No. 9 UMass $^	7	–	1	–	0	8	–	2	–	1
No. T–19 New Hampshire	5	–	3	–	0	7	–	3	–	1
Delaware	5	–	3	–	0	6	–	5	–	0
Connecticut	5	–	3	–	0	6	–	5	–	0
Villanova	5	–	3	–	0	6	–	5	–	0
Boston University	4	–	4	–	0	5	–	6	–	0
Maine	2	–	6	–	0	3	–	8	–	0
Rhode Island	2	–	6	–	0	5	–	6	–	0
Richmond	1	–	7	–	0	1	–	10	–	0
$ – Conference champion; ^ – NCAA Division I-AA playoff participant; Rankings from NCAA Division I-AA Football Committee poll

The 1990 UMass Minutemen football team represented the University of Massachusetts Amherst in the 1990 NCAA Division I-AA football season as a member of the Yankee Conference. The team was coached by Jim Reid and played its home games at Warren McGuirk Alumni Stadium in Hadley, Massachusetts. The Minutemen made their second playoff appearance in three years, but would lose in the first round to future conference foe William & Mary. It would be the last playoff appearance for UMass until the 1998 National Championship season. UMass finished the season with a record of 8–2–1 overall and 7–1 in conference play.

== Schedule ==
Date	Opponent	Rank	Site	Result	Attendance	Source
September 8	at No. 7 Holy Cross*		Fitton Field; Worcester, MA	T 10–10	16,444	
September 15	Maine		McGuirk Stadium; Hadley, MA	W 21–10	10,431	
September 29	Boston University	No. 19	McGuirk Stadium; Hadley, MA	W 47–16	8,247	
October 6	at Rhode Island	No. 10	Meade Stadium; Kingston, RI	W 16–13	9,407	
October 13	Connecticut	No. 9	McGuirk Stadium; Hadley, MA (rivalry)	W 38–19	2,459	
October 20	at Delaware	No. 8	Delaware Stadium; Newark, DE	W 17–3	22,184	
October 27	Northeastern*	No. 8	McGuirk Stadium; Hadley, MA	W 28–21	8,810	
November 3	at Richmond	No. 8	University of Richmond Stadium; Richmond, VA	W 26–9	7,012	
November 10	Villanova	No. 5	McGuirk Stadium; Hadley, MA	W 3–0	1,100	
November 17	at New Hampshire	No. 4	Cowell Stadium; Durham, NH (rivalry)	L 18–36	8,062	
November 24	at No. 7 William & Mary*	No. 9	Zable Stadium; Williamsburg, VA (NCAA Division I-AA First Round)	L 0–38	7,027	
*Non-conference game; Rankings from NCAA Division I-AA Football Committee Poll released prior to the game
