= 1990 Youngstown State Penguins football team =

American college football season

1990 Youngstown State Penguins football

NCAA Division I-AA First Round, L 17–20 vs. UCF
- Conference: Independent
- Record: 11–1
- Head coach: Jim Tressel (5th season)
- Offensive coordinator: Jim Bollman (2nd season)
- Home stadium: Stambaugh Stadium

1990 NCAA Division I-AA independents football standings
	Conf.			Overall
Team	W	L	T	W		L		T
No. 2 Youngstown State ^		–		11	–	1	–	0
No. 7 William & Mary ^		–		10	–	2	–	0
No. 3 Georgia Southern ^		–		9	–	3	–	0
No. 18 UCF ^		–		9	–	3	–	0
Liberty		–		7	–	4	–	0
Samford		–		6	–	4	–	1
James Madison		–		5	–	6	–	0
Nicholls State		–		5	–	6	–	0
Arkansas State		–		3	–	7	–	1
Western Kentucky		–		2	–	8	–	0
Towson State		–		2	–	9	–	0
Northeastern		–		1	–	10	–	0
^ – NCAA Division I-AA playoff participant; Rankings from NCAA Division I-AA Football Committee poll

The 1990 Youngstown State Penguins football team was an American football team represented Youngstown State University as an independent during the 1990 NCAA Division I-AA football season. In their fifth season under head coach Jim Tressel, the team compiled an 11–1 record and lost to UCF in the first round of the NCAA Division I-AA playoffs.

Wide receiver Ray Ellington received the team's most valuable player award. The team's statistical leaders included Ray Issac with 1,597 passing yards, Archie Herring with 904 rushing yards, Ray Ellington with 696 receiving yards, Jeff Wilkins with 86 points scored, and Derek Pixley with 96 tackles (including 60 solo tackles).

== Schedule ==
Date	Opponent	Rank	Site	Result	Attendance	Source
September 1	Bloomsburg	No. 13	Stambaugh Stadium; Youngstown, OH	W 43–7		
September 8	No. 8 (D-II) Edinboro	No. 13	Stambaugh Stadium; Youngstown, OH	W 31–27		
September 15	at Northeastern	No. 13	Parsons Field; Brookline, MA	W 37–3	1,650	
September 22	Eastern Michigan	No. 15	Stambaugh Stadium; Youngstown, OH	W 24–14		
September 29	Akron	No. 12	Stambaugh Stadium; Youngstown, OH (Steel Tire)	W 28–23	17,001	
October 6	at Western Kentucky	No. 6т	L. T. Smith Stadium; Bowling Green, KY	W 17–14	14,500	
October 13	at Liberty	No. 7	Willard May Stadium; Lynchburg, VA	W 34–6		
October 20	at James Madison	No. 6	Bridgeforth Stadium; Harrisonburg, VA	W 31–15	12,812	
November 3	Ohio^{†}	No. 5	Stambaugh Stadium; Youngstown, OH	W 27–0		
November 10	at Towson State	No. 4	Minnegan Stadium; Towson, MD	W 13–0	650	
November 17	Maine	No. 3	Stambaugh Stadium; Youngstown, OH	W 38–17		
November 24	No. 18 UCF	No. 2	Stambaugh Stadium; Youngstown, OH (NCAA Division I-AA First Round)	L 17–20	12,500	
^{†}Homecoming; Rankings from NCAA Division I-AA Football Committee Poll released prior to the game
