= 1990 Rhode Island Rams football team =

American college football season

1990 Rhode Island Rams football
- Conference: Yankee Conference
- Record: 5–6 (2–6 Yankee)
- Head coach: Bob Griffin (15th season)
- Home stadium: Meade Stadium

1990 Yankee Conference football standings
	Conf.					Overall
Team	W		L		T	W		L		T
No. 9 UMass $^	7	–	1	–	0	8	–	2	–	1
No. T–19 New Hampshire	5	–	3	–	0	7	–	3	–	1
Delaware	5	–	3	–	0	6	–	5	–	0
Connecticut	5	–	3	–	0	6	–	5	–	0
Villanova	5	–	3	–	0	6	–	5	–	0
Boston University	4	–	4	–	0	5	–	6	–	0
Maine	2	–	6	–	0	3	–	8	–	0
Rhode Island	2	–	6	–	0	5	–	6	–	0
Richmond	1	–	7	–	0	1	–	10	–	0
$ – Conference champion; ^ – NCAA Division I-AA playoff participant; Rankings from NCAA Division I-AA Football Committee poll

The 1990 Rhode Island Rams football team was an American football team that represented the University of Rhode Island in the Yankee Conference during the 1990 NCAA Division I-AA football season. In their 15th season under head coach Bob Griffin, the Rams compiled a 5–6 record (2–6 against conference opponents) and tied for seventh place out of nine teams in the conference.

== Schedule ==
Date	Opponent	Site	Result	Attendance	Source
September 8	Towson State*	Meade Stadium; Kingston, RI	W 40–21	6,297	
September 15	Richmond	Meade Stadium; Kingston, RI	W 37–20	5,321	
September 22	Brown*	Meade Stadium; Kingston, RI (rivalry)	W 23–3	7,413	
September 29	at Delaware	Delaware Stadium; Newark, DE	L 19–24	12,341	
October 6	No. 10 UMass	Meade Stadium; Kingston, RI	L 13–16	9,407	
October 13	at Maine	Alumni Field; Orono, ME	L 17–24	6,103	
October 20	Boston University^{†}	Meade Stadium; Kingston, RI	L 13–15	10,228	
October 27	at Villanova	Villanova Stadium; Villanova, PA	L 7–14	9,257	
November 3	at Northeastern*	Parsons Field; Brookline, MA	W 31–11	6,200	
November 10	No. T–20 New Hampshire	Meade Stadium; Kingston, RI	W 24–14	500	
November 17	at Connecticut	Memorial Stadium; Storrs, CT (rivalry)	L 21–51	6,215	
*Non-conference game; ^{†}Homecoming; Rankings from NCAA Division I-AA Football Committee Poll released prior to the game
