= 1990 Towson State Tigers football team =

American college football season

1990 Towson State Tigers football
- Conference: Independent
- Record: 2–9
- Head coach: Phil Albert (19th season)
- Home stadium: Minnegan Stadium

1990 NCAA Division I-AA independents football standings
	Conf.			Overall
Team	W	L	T	W		L		T
No. 2 Youngstown State ^		–		11	–	1	–	0
No. 7 William & Mary ^		–		10	–	2	–	0
No. 3 Georgia Southern ^		–		9	–	3	–	0
No. 18 UCF ^		–		9	–	3	–	0
Liberty		–		7	–	4	–	0
Samford		–		6	–	4	–	1
James Madison		–		5	–	6	–	0
Nicholls State		–		5	–	6	–	0
Arkansas State		–		3	–	7	–	1
Western Kentucky		–		2	–	8	–	0
Towson State		–		2	–	9	–	0
Northeastern		–		1	–	10	–	0
^ – NCAA Division I-AA playoff participant; Rankings from NCAA Division I-AA Football Committee poll

The 1990 Towson State Tigers football team was an American football team that represented Towson State University (now known as Towson University) as an independent during the 1990 NCAA Division I-AA football season. Led by 19th-year head coach Phil Albert, the team compiled a 2–9 record.

== Schedule ==
Date	Opponent	Site	Result	Attendance	Source
September 8	at Rhode Island	Meade Stadium; Kingston, RI	L 21–40	6,297	
September 15	Lehigh	Minnegan Stadium; Towson, MD	L 14–35		
September 22	at Delaware State	Alumni Stadium; Dover, DE	L 13–24		
September 29	at No. 5 (D-II) IUP	Miller Stadium; Indiana, PA	L 0–42		
October 6	at Bucknell	Christy Mathewson–Memorial Stadium; Lewisburg, PA	L 26–55	4,041	
October 13	James Madison	Minnegan Stadium; Towson, MD	L 14–21		
October 21	Liberty	Minnegan Stadium; Towson, MD	L 10–30		
October 27	Howard	Minnegan Stadium; Towson, MD	W 17–7		
November 3	New Haven	Minnegan Stadium; Towson, MD	L 27–55	3,898	
November 10	No. 4 Youngstown State	Minnegan Stadium; Towson, MD	L 0–13	650	
November 17	Northeastern	Minnegan Stadium; Towson, MD	W 21–14		
Rankings from NCAA Division I-AA Football Committee Poll released prior to the game
