= 1990 Tennessee State Tigers football team =

American college football season

1990 Tennessee State Tigers football
- Conference: Ohio Valley Conference
- Record: 7–4 (4–2 OVC)
- Head coach: Joe Gilliam Sr. (2nd season)
- Home stadium: Hale Stadium; Vanderbilt Stadium

1990 Ohio Valley Conference football standings
	Conf.					Overall
Team	W		L		T	W		L		T
No. 1 Middle Tennessee +^	5	–	1	–	0	11	–	2	–	0
No. 5 Eastern Kentucky +^	5	–	1	–	0	10	–	2	–	0
Tennessee State	4	–	2	–	0	7	–	4	–	0
Tennessee Tech	3	–	3	–	0	6	–	5	–	0
Morehead State	3	–	3	–	0	5	–	6	–	0
Murray State	1	–	5	–	0	2	–	9	–	0
Austin Peay	0	–	6	–	0	0	–	11	–	0
+ – Conference co-champions; ^ – NCAA Division I-AA playoff participant; Rankings from NCAA Division I-AA Football Committee poll

The 1990 Tennessee State Tigers football team represented Tennessee State University as a member of the Ohio Valley Conference (OVC) during the 1990 NCAA Division I-AA football season. Led by second-year head coach Joe Gilliam Sr., the Tigers compiled an overall record of 7–4, with a conference record of 4–2, and finished third in the OVC.

== Schedule ==
Date	Opponent	Site	Result	Attendance	Source
September 1	No. 11 Middle Tennessee	Vanderbilt Stadium; Nashville, TN	L 6–38	25,000	
September 8	vs. Jackson State (Note: Tennessee State's game against Jackson State was a designated conference game and counted in the OVC standings.)	Liberty Bowl Memorial Stadium; Memphis, TN (Southern Heritage Classic)	W 23–14	39,579	
September 15	at Grambling State*	Eddie G. Robinson Memorial Stadium; Grambling, LA	L 20–37	5,291	
September 22	vs. Florida A&M*	Bobby Dodd Stadium; Atlanta, GA (Atlanta Football Classic)	W 20–16	46,024	
September 29	vs. Central State (OH)*	Cardinal Stadium; Louisville, KY (River City Classic)	L 14–35	28,942	
October 6	at Austin Peay	Municipal Stadium; Clarksville, TN	W 33–7	8,058	
October 20	at No. 1 Eastern Kentucky	Hanger Field; Richmond, KY	L 17–55	20,800	
October 27	at Murray State	Roy Stewart Stadium; Murray, KY	W 23–17		
November 3	Tennessee Tech	Hale Stadium; Nashville, TN	W 36–14		
November 10	Southern*	Vanderbilt Stadium; Nashville, TN	W 31–21	31,400	
November 17	Mississippi Valley State*	Hale Stadium; Nashville, TN	W 45–7	7,700	
*Non-conference game; Rankings from NCAA Division I-AA Football Committee Poll released prior to the game
