= 1990 The Citadel Bulldogs football team =

American college football season

1990 The Citadel Bulldogs football
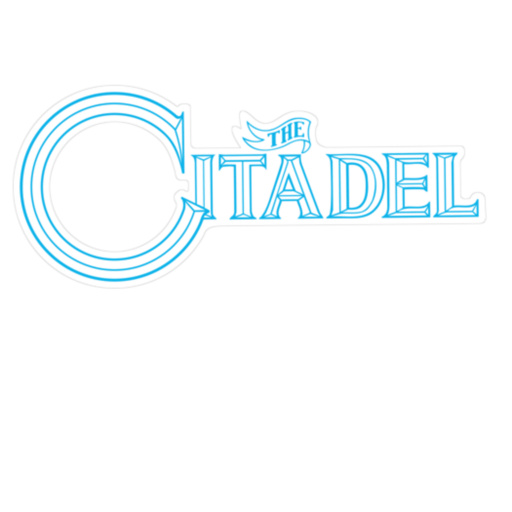

NCAA Division I-AA First Round, L 0–31 vs. Georgia Southern
- Conference: Southern Conference
- Record: 7–5 (4–3 SoCon)
- Head coach: Charlie Taaffe (4th season)
- Offensive scheme: Option
- Defensive coordinator: Don Powers (2nd season)
- Home stadium: Johnson Hagood Stadium

1990 Southern Conference football standings
	Conf.					Overall
Team	W		L		T	W		L		T
No. 12 Furman $^	6	–	1	–	0	9	–	4	–	0
Appalachian State	5	–	2	–	0	6	–	5	–	0
Chattanooga	4	–	2	–	0	6	–	5	–	0
No. 15 The Citadel ^	4	–	3	–	0	7	–	5	–	0
Marshall	4	–	3	–	0	6	–	5	–	0
Western Carolina	2	–	5	–	0	3	–	8	–	0
VMI	1	–	5	–	0	4	–	7	–	0
East Tennessee State	1	–	6	–	0	2	–	9	–	0
$ – Conference champion; ^ – NCAA Division I-AA playoff participant; Rankings from NCAA Division I-AA Football Committee poll

The 1990 The Citadel Bulldogs football team represented The Citadel, The Military College of South Carolina in the 1990 NCAA Division I-AA football season. The Bulldogs were led by fourth-year head coach Charlie Taaffe and played their home games at Johnson Hagood Stadium. They played as members of the Southern Conference, as they have since 1936. In 1990, The Citadel made their second appearance in the I-AA playoffs, and second in three years.

== Schedule ==
Date	Opponent	Rank	Site	Result	Attendance	Source
September 8	No. 10 William & Mary*	No. 20	Johnson Hagood Stadium; Charleston, SC	W 34–31	18,011	
September 15	at Air Force*	No. 20	Falcon Stadium; Colorado Springs, CO	L 7–10	37,412	
September 22	Marshall	No. 11	Johnson Hagood Stadium; Charleston, SC	W 21–10	17,105	
September 29	at Appalachian State	No. 9	Kidd Brewer Stadium; Boone, NC	L 9–27	18,281	
October 6	at Western Carolina	No. 18	Whitmire Stadium; Cullowhee, NC	W 28–10	11,148	
October 13	Chattanooga	No. 12	Johnson Hagood Stadium; Charleston, SC	L 6–7	19,522	
October 20	at South Carolina*		Williams–Brice Stadium; Columbia, SC	W 38–35	63,000	
October 27	East Tennessee State	No. 16	Johnson Hagood Stadium; Charleston, SC	W 35–15	13,217	
November 3	VMI^{†}	No. 16	Johnson Hagood Stadium; Charleston, SC (Military Classic of the South)	W 23–3	19,754	
November 10	Wofford	No. 12	Johnson Hagood Stadium; Charleston, SC (rivalry)	W 48–14	14,121	
November 17	at No. 13 Furman	No. 11	Paladin Stadium; Greenville, SC (rivalry)	L 17–30	18,190	
November 24	at No. 3 Georgia Southern	No. 15	Paulson Stadium; Statesboro, GA (NCAA Division I-AA First Round)	L 0–31	11,881	
*Non-conference game; ^{†}Homecoming; Rankings from NCAA Division I-AA Football Committee Poll released prior to the game

== Game summaries ==
=== South Carolina ===
Team	1	2	3	4	Total
• Bulldogs	14	0	7	17	38
Gamecocks	0	14	7	14	35

- Date: October 20, 1990
- Location: Williams-Brice Stadium, Columbia, SC
- Game attendance: 63,000

Scoring summary
1	CIT	Garrett Sizer 1–yard run (Howard Barnard kick)	CIT 7–0
1	CIT	Erick Little 1–yard run (Barnard kick)	CIT 14–0
2	USC	David Pitchko 18–yard reception (Collin Mackie kick)	CIT 14–7
2	USC	Eddie Miller 75–yard reception (Mackie kick)	TIE 14–14
3	CIT	Jack Douglas 20–yard run (Barnard kick)	CIT 21–14
3	USC	Harold Dingle 2–yard run (Mackie kick)	TIE 21–21
4	USC	Rob DeBoer 3–yard run (Mackie kick)	USC 28–21
4	CIT	Everette Sands 7–yard run (Barnard kick)	TIE 28–28
4	USC	DeBoer 44–yard run (Mackie kick)	USC 35–28
4	CIT	Barnard 37–yard field goal	USC 35–31
4	CIT	Douglas 1–yard run (Barnard kick)	CIT 38–35

== Ranking movements ==
Ranking movements Legend: ██ Increase in ranking ██ Decrease in ranking — = Not ranked
	Week												
Poll	Pre	1	2	3	4	5	6	7	8	9	10	11	Final
I-AA Committee	20	20*	20*	11	9	18	12	—	16	16	12	11	15
Sports Network	—	—	15	13	10	—	16	—	17	15	14	13	15
