= 1990 New Hampshire Wildcats football team =

American college football season

1990 New Hampshire Wildcats football
- Conference: Yankee Conference
- Record: 7–3–1 (5–3 Yankee)
- Head coach: Bill Bowes (19th season)
- Offensive coordinator: Gary Crowton (3rd season)
- Home stadium: Cowell Stadium

1990 Yankee Conference football standings
	Conf.					Overall
Team	W		L		T	W		L		T
No. 9 UMass $^	7	–	1	–	0	8	–	2	–	1
No. T–19 New Hampshire	5	–	3	–	0	7	–	3	–	1
Delaware	5	–	3	–	0	6	–	5	–	0
Connecticut	5	–	3	–	0	6	–	5	–	0
Villanova	5	–	3	–	0	6	–	5	–	0
Boston University	4	–	4	–	0	5	–	6	–	0
Maine	2	–	6	–	0	3	–	8	–	0
Rhode Island	2	–	6	–	0	5	–	6	–	0
Richmond	1	–	7	–	0	1	–	10	–	0
$ – Conference champion; ^ – NCAA Division I-AA playoff participant; Rankings from NCAA Division I-AA Football Committee poll

The 1990 New Hampshire Wildcats football team was an American football team that represented the University of New Hampshire as a member of the Yankee Conference during the 1990 NCAA Division I-AA football season. In its 19th year under head coach Bill Bowes, the team compiled a 7–3–1 record (5–3 against conference opponents) and tied for second place out of nine teams in the Yankee Conference.

== Schedule ==
Date	Opponent	Rank	Site	Result	Attendance	Source
September 8	at No. 8 Connecticut		Memorial Stadium; Storrs, CT	W 21–16	9,214	
September 15	Delaware		Cowell Stadium; Durham, NH	W 34–7	6,385	
September 22	at Maine	No. 4	Alumni Field; Orono, ME (Battle for the Brice–Cowell Musket)	W 28–20	10,483	
September 29	Dartmouth*	No. 3	Cowell Stadium; Durham, NH (rivalry)	T 21–21	9,563	
October 6	at Richmond	No. T–6	University of Richmond Stadium; Richmond, VA	W 19–0		
October 13	at No. 11 Colgate*	No. 6	Andy Kerr Stadium; Hamilton, NY	W 38–22	6,209	
October 20	Northeastern*	No. 5	Cowell Stadium; Durham, NH	W 59–7		
October 27	at Boston University	No. 5	Nickerson Field; Boston, MA	L 24–41		
November 3	Villanova	No. 13	Cowell Stadium; Durham, NH	L 7–10		
November 10	at Rhode Island	No. T–20	Meade Stadium; Kingston, RI	L 14–24	500	
November 17	No. 4 UMass		Cowell Stadium; Durham, NH (rivalry)	W 36–18	8,062	
*Non-conference game; Rankings from NCAA Division I-AA Football Committee Poll released prior to the game
