= 1990 Maine Black Bears football team =

American college football season

1990 Maine Black Bears football
- Conference: Yankee Conference
- Record: 3–8 (2–6 Yankee)
- Head coach: Kirk Ferentz (1st season)
- Offensive coordinator: Jack Cosgrove (2nd season)
- Defensive coordinator: Ray Zingler (1st season)
- Captains: Rob Noble; Tom Rogers
- Home stadium: Alumni Field

1990 Yankee Conference football standings
	Conf.					Overall
Team	W		L		T	W		L		T
No. 9 UMass $^	7	–	1	–	0	8	–	2	–	1
No. T–19 New Hampshire	5	–	3	–	0	7	–	3	–	1
Delaware	5	–	3	–	0	6	–	5	–	0
Connecticut	5	–	3	–	0	6	–	5	–	0
Villanova	5	–	3	–	0	6	–	5	–	0
Boston University	4	–	4	–	0	5	–	6	–	0
Maine	2	–	6	–	0	3	–	8	–	0
Rhode Island	2	–	6	–	0	5	–	6	–	0
Richmond	1	–	7	–	0	1	–	10	–	0
$ – Conference champion; ^ – NCAA Division I-AA playoff participant; Rankings from NCAA Division I-AA Football Committee poll

The 1990 Maine Black Bears football team was an American football team that represented the University of Maine as a member of the Yankee Conference during the 1990 NCAA Division I-AA football season. The team compiled a 3–8 record (2–6 against conference opponents) and tied for seventh place in the Yankee Conference. Rob Noble and Tom Rogers were the team captains.

Kirk Ferentz led the team in his first season as a head coach. Ferentz was hired in January 1990 after nine years as Iowa's offensive line coach.

== Schedule ==
Date	Opponent	Site	Result	Attendance	Source
September 7	at Villanova	Villanova Stadium; Villanova, PA	L 7–31	12,137	
September 15	at UMass	McGuirk Stadium; Hadley, MA	L 10–21	10,431	
September 22	No. 4 New Hampshire	Alumni Field; Orono, ME (rivalry)	L 20–28	10,483	
September 29	at Richmond	UR Stadium; Richmond, VA	L 16–24	8,543	
October 6	at Hawaii	Aloha Stadium; Halawa, HI	L 3–44	35,938	
October 13	Rhode Island	Alumni Field; Orono, ME	W 24–17	6,103	
October 20	at Connecticut	Memorial Stadium; Storrs, CT	L 20–35	8,421	
October 27	Delaware	Alumni Field; Orono, ME	W 17–10		
November 3	vs. Boston University	Nickerson Field; Boston, MA	L 24–26		
November 10	Northeastern*	Alumni Field; Orono, ME	W 42–7	2,615	
November 17	at No. 3 Youngstown State*	Stambaugh Stadium; Youngstown, OH	L 17–38	14,059	
*Non-conference game; Rankings from NCAA Division I-AA Football Committee Poll released prior to the game
