= 1990 Western Kentucky Hilltoppers football team =

American college football season

1990 Western Kentucky Hilltoppers football
- Conference: Independent
- Record: 2–8
- Head coach: Jack Harbaugh (2nd season)
- Captains: Scott Campbell; Eddie Godfrey; Raji Gordon
- Home stadium: L. T. Smith Stadium

1990 NCAA Division I-AA independents football standings
	Conf.			Overall
Team	W	L	T	W		L		T
No. 2 Youngstown State ^		–		11	–	1	–	0
No. 7 William & Mary ^		–		10	–	2	–	0
No. 3 Georgia Southern ^		–		9	–	3	–	0
No. 18 UCF ^		–		9	–	3	–	0
Liberty		–		7	–	4	–	0
Samford		–		6	–	4	–	1
James Madison		–		5	–	6	–	0
Nicholls State		–		5	–	6	–	0
Arkansas State		–		3	–	7	–	1
Western Kentucky		–		2	–	8	–	0
Towson State		–		2	–	9	–	0
Northeastern		–		1	–	10	–	0
^ – NCAA Division I-AA playoff participant; Rankings from NCAA Division I-AA Football Committee poll

The 1990 Western Kentucky Hilltoppers football team represented Western Kentucky University as an independent during the 1990 NCAA Division I-AA football season Led by second-year head coach Jack Harbaugh, the Hilltoppers compiled a record of 2–8.

== Schedule ==
Date	Opponent	Rank	Site	Result	Attendance	Source
September 8	at Morehead State		Jayne Stadium; Morehead, KY	W 24–0	5,200	
September 15	Illinois State		L. T. Smith Stadium; Bowling Green, KY	W 19–9	14,500	
September 22	at No. 2 Middle Tennessee	No. 14	Johnny "Red" Floyd Stadium; Murfreesboro, TN	L 7–20	14,000	
September 29	No. 7 Eastern Kentucky	No. 19	L. T. Smith Stadium; Bowling Green, KY (Battle of the Bluegrass)	L 12–35	18,000	
October 6	No. T–6 Youngstown State^{†}		L. T. Smith Stadium; Bowling Green, KY	L 14–17	14,500	
October 13	at Tennessee Tech		Tucker Stadium; Cookeville, TN	L 22–33	11,183	
October 27	at Louisville		Cardinal Stadium; Louisville, KY	L 7–41	35,122	
November 3	at Eastern Illinois		O'Brien Field; Charleston, IL	L 6–28	9,008	
November 10	Indiana State		L. T. Smith Stadium; Bowling Green, KY	L 27–29	3,800	
November 17	Chattanooga		L. T. Smith Stadium; Bowling Green, KY	L 21–22	3,900	
^{†}Homecoming; Rankings from NCAA Division I-AA Football Committee Poll released prior to the game
