= 1990 UCF Knights football team =

American college football season

1990 UCF Knights football

NCAA Division I-AA Semifinal, L 7–44 at Georgia Southern
- Conference: Independent
- Record: 10–4
- Head coach: Gene McDowell (6th season)
- Offensive coordinator: Mike Kruczek (6th season)
- Defensive coordinator: Don Pollard (1st season)
- Home stadium: Florida Citrus Bowl

1990 NCAA Division I-AA independents football standings
	Conf.			Overall
Team	W	L	T	W		L		T
No. 2 Youngstown State ^		–		11	–	1	–	0
No. 7 William & Mary ^		–		10	–	2	–	0
No. 3 Georgia Southern ^		–		9	–	3	–	0
No. 18 UCF ^		–		9	–	3	–	0
Liberty		–		7	–	4	–	0
Samford		–		6	–	4	–	1
James Madison		–		5	–	6	–	0
Nicholls State		–		5	–	6	–	0
Arkansas State		–		3	–	7	–	1
Western Kentucky		–		2	–	8	–	0
Towson State		–		2	–	9	–	0
Northeastern		–		1	–	10	–	0
^ – NCAA Division I-AA playoff participant; Rankings from NCAA Division I-AA Football Committee poll

The 1990 UCF Knights football team was the twelfth season for the team, and UCF football's first season in Division I-AA (now commonly known as 'FCS'). In their first year in the division, Gene McDowell led the Knights to a 10–4 record, a program best, and a trip to the I-AA playoffs. UCF would make it to the semifinals, and became the first school in history to qualify for the I-AA playoffs in its first season of eligibility.

During the 1990s, UCF would compile an overall record of 67–46–0 (.593) during the decade.

== Schedule ==
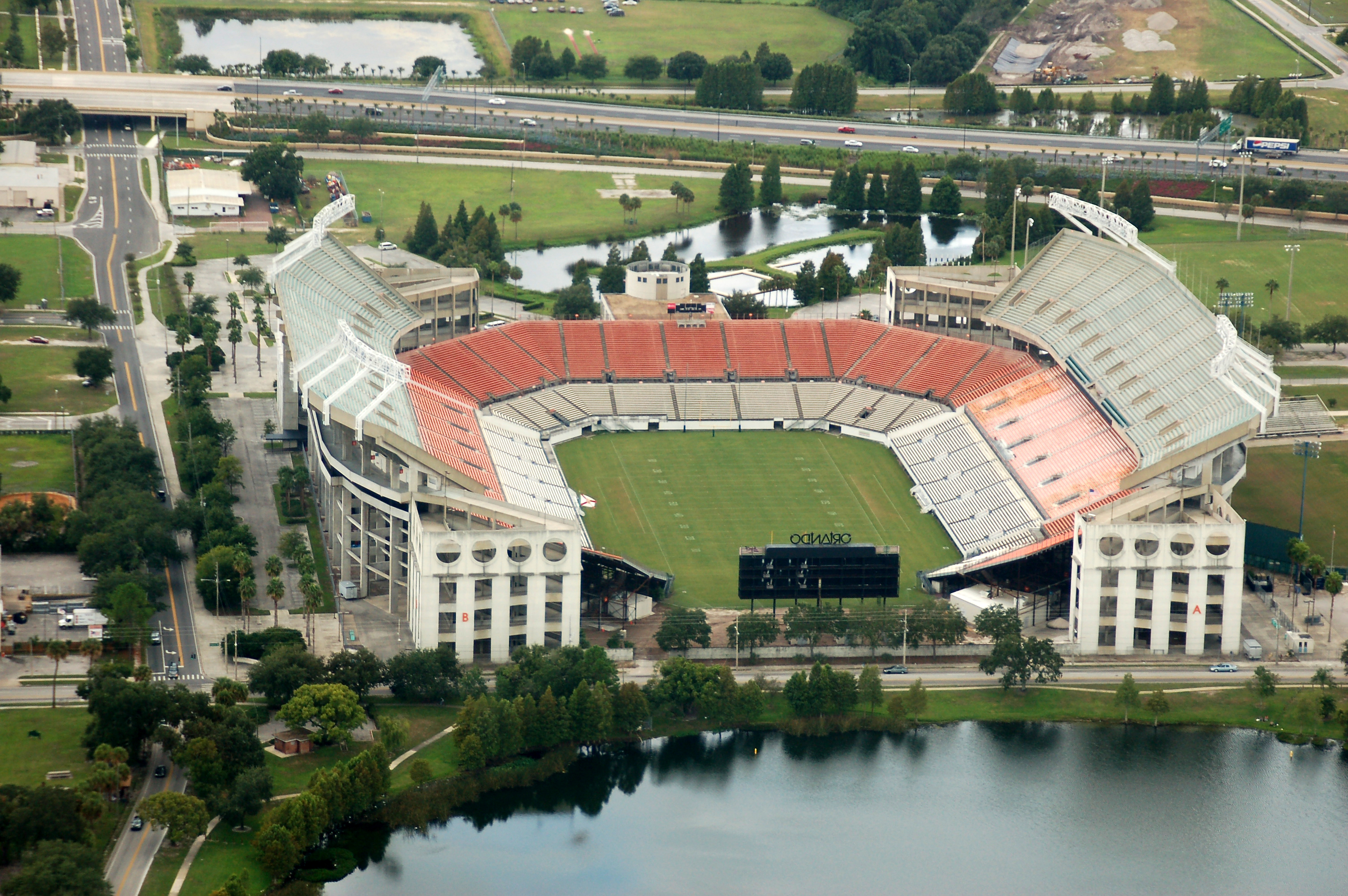
The Florida Citrus Bowl, the Knights' home field

Date	Opponent	Rank	Site	Result	Attendance	Source
September 1	Troy State		Florida Citrus Bowl; Orlando, FL	W 16–10	22,462	
September 8	at No. 3 Eastern Kentucky		Hanger Field; Richmond, KY	L 12–24	19,200	
September 15	at Bethune–Cookman		Municipal Stadium; Daytona Beach, FL	W 42–9	9,500	
September 22	at Memphis State		Liberty Bowl Memorial Stadium; Memphis, TN	L 28–37	21,385	
September 29	Kentucky State		Florida Citrus Bowl; Orlando, FL	W 49–0	6,055	
October 6	at Samford		Seibert Stadium; Homewood, AL	W 37–16	5,463	
October 20	No. 11 Georgia Southern		Florida Citrus Bowl; Orlando, FL	L 17–38	16,258	
October 27	Southern Illinois		Florida Citrus Bowl; Orlando, FL	W 49–14	14,052	
November 3	Liberty		Florida Citrus Bowl; Orlando, FL	W 28–6	14,107	
November 10	Slippery Rock		Florida Citrus Bowl; Orlando, FL	W 24–21	16,208	
November 17	Texas Southern	No. 18	Florida Citrus Bowl; Orlando, FL	W 63–6	16,328	
November 24	at No. 2 Youngstown State	No. 18	Stambaugh Stadium; Youngstown, OH (NCAA Division I-AA First Round)	W 20–17	12,500	
December 1	No. 7 William & Mary	No. 18	Florida Citrus Bowl; Orlando, FL (NCAA Division I-AA Quarterfinal)	W 52–38	20,067	
December 8	at No. 3 Georgia Southern	No. 18	Paulson Stadium; Statesboro, GA (NCAA Division I-AA Semifinal)	L 7–44	13,183	
Rankings from NCAA Division I-AA Football Committee Poll released prior to the game
