= Jimmy Satterfield =

American football coach (1939–2019)

Biographical details
- Born: October 11, 1939; Lancaster, South Carolina, U.S.
- Died: May 6, 2019 (aged 79); Easley, South Carolina, U.S.

Coaching career (HC unless noted)
- 1973–1985: Furman (assistant)
- 1986–1993: Furman
- 1996–2003: Lexington HS (SC)

Head coaching record
- Overall: 66–29–3 (college)
- Tournaments: 7–3 (NCAA D-I-AA playoffs)

Accomplishments and honors

Championships
- 1 NCAA Division I-AA (1988); 3 SoCon (1988–1990)

Awards
- AFCA Division I-AA Coach of the Year (1988)

James Satterfield (October 11, 1939 – May 6, 2019) was an American football coach. He served as head football coach at Furman University from 1986 to 1993, where he compiled a record of 66–29–3.

== Career ==
Satterfield was named the AFCA Coach of the Year in 1988 after leading Furman to an overall 13–2 record while being Southern Conference co-champions and then defeating Georgia Southern in the 1988 NCAA Division I-AA Football Championship Game. Satterfield was the second Furman football head coach to be the AFCA Division I-AA Coach of the Year; in 1985, three years earlier, Dick Sheridan won the award after leading the Paladins to a 12–2 record and a close two-point loss in the National Championship game.

Satterfield was the head football coach at Lexington High School, in Lexington, South Carolina from 1996 to 2003.

== Death ==
Satterfield died of complications from cardiac surgery in 2019 at the age of 79.

== Head coaching record ==
=== College ===
Year	Team	Overall	Conference	Standing	Bowl/playoffs
Furman Paladins (Southern Conference) (1986–1993)
1986	Furman	7–3–2	4–2–1	3rd	L NCAA Division I-AA First Round
1987	Furman	7–4	4–3	T–3rd	
1988	Furman	13–2	6–1	T–1st	W NCAA Division I-AA Championship
1989	Furman	12–2	7–0	1st	L NCAA Division I-AA Semifinal
1990	Furman	9–4	6–1	1st	L NCAA Division I-AA Quarterfinal
1991	Furman	7–4	4–3	T–4th	
1992	Furman	6–5	4–3	5th	
1993	Furman	5–5–1	4–4	4th	
Furman:		66–29–3	39–17–1		
Total:		66–29–3			
National championship Conference title Conference division title or championship game berth
