= 1990 Morehead State Eagles football team =

American college football season

1990 Morehead State Eagles football
- Conference: Ohio Valley Conference
- Record: 5–6 (3–3 OVC)
- Head coach: Cole Proctor (1st season)
- Home stadium: Jayne Stadium

1990 Ohio Valley Conference football standings
	Conf.					Overall
Team	W		L		T	W		L		T
No. 1 Middle Tennessee +^	5	–	1	–	0	11	–	2	–	0
No. 5 Eastern Kentucky +^	5	–	1	–	0	10	–	2	–	0
Tennessee State	4	–	2	–	0	7	–	4	–	0
Tennessee Tech	3	–	3	–	0	6	–	5	–	0
Morehead State	3	–	3	–	0	5	–	6	–	0
Murray State	1	–	5	–	0	2	–	9	–	0
Austin Peay	0	–	6	–	0	0	–	11	–	0
+ – Conference co-champions; ^ – NCAA Division I-AA playoff participant; Rankings from NCAA Division I-AA Football Committee poll

The 1990 Morehead State Eagles football team represented Morehead State University as a member of the Ohio Valley Conference (OVC) during the 1990 NCAA Division I-AA football season. Led by first-year head coach Cole Proctor, the Eagles compiled an overall record of 5–6, with a mark of 3–3 in conference play, and finished tied for fourth in the OVC.

== Schedule ==
Date	Opponent	Site	Result	Attendance	Source
September 1	at Marshall*	Fairfield Stadium; Huntington, WV	L 14–28	16,546	
September 8	Western Kentucky (Note: Morehead State's game against Western Kentucky was a designated conference game and counted in the OVC standings.)	Jayne Stadium; Morehead, KY	L 0–24	5,200	
September 15	at Kentucky State*	Alumni Field; Frankfort, KY	W 35–13		
September 22	at No. 9 Liberty*	Willard May Stadium; Lynchburg, VA	L 13–42		
September 29	Morgan State*	Jayne Stadium; Morehead, KY	W 47–0		
October 6	at Tennessee Tech	Tucker Stadium; Cookeville, TN	L 7–24	5,012	
October 13	Austin Peay	Jayne Stadium; Morehead, KY	W 34–7	6,700	
October 20	Samford*	Jayne Stadium; Morehead, KY	L 22–25		
October 27	at No. 4 Middle Tennessee	Johnny "Red" Floyd Stadium; Murfreesboro, TN	L 0–37		
November 3	Murray State	Jayne Stadium; Morehead, KY	W 69–6		
November 17	at No. 1 Eastern Kentucky	Hanger Field; Richmond, KY (rivalry)	W 27–17		
*Non-conference game; Rankings from NCAA Division I-AA Football Committee Poll released prior to the game
