= 1990 Chattanooga Moccasins football team =

American college football season

1990 Chattanooga Moccasins football
- Conference: Southern Conference
- Record: 6–5 (4–2 SoCon)
- Head coach: Buddy Nix (7th season)
- Captains: Derrick McLendon; Troy Boeck
- Home stadium: Chamberlain Field

1990 Southern Conference football standings
	Conf.					Overall
Team	W		L		T	W		L		T
No. 12 Furman $^	6	–	1	–	0	9	–	4	–	0
Appalachian State	5	–	2	–	0	6	–	5	–	0
Chattanooga	4	–	2	–	0	6	–	5	–	0
No. 15 The Citadel ^	4	–	3	–	0	7	–	5	–	0
Marshall	4	–	3	–	0	6	–	5	–	0
Western Carolina	2	–	5	–	0	3	–	8	–	0
VMI	1	–	5	–	0	4	–	7	–	0
East Tennessee State	1	–	6	–	0	2	–	9	–	0
$ – Conference champion; ^ – NCAA Division I-AA playoff participant; Rankings from NCAA Division I-AA Football Committee poll

The 1990 Chattanooga Moccasins football team represented the University of Tennessee at Chattanooga as a member of the Southern Conference (SoCon) in the 1990 NCAA Division I-AA football season. The Moccasins were led by seventh-year head coach Buddy Nix and played their home games at Charmerlain Field. They finished the season 6–5 overall and 4–2 in SoCon play to place third.

== Schedule ==
Date	Opponent	Rank	Site	Result	Attendance	Source
September 8	at Tennessee Tech*		Tucker Stadium; Cookeville, TN	W 40–17	7,023	
September 15	No. 1 Furman		Chamberlain Field; Chattanooga, TN	L 21–38	10,215	
September 22	at Georgia Tech*		Bobby Dodd Stadium; Atlanta, GA	L 9–44	32,911	
September 29	No. 1 Middle Tennessee*		Chamberlain Field; Chattanooga, TN	L 17–24	8,229	
October 6	East Tennessee State^{†}		Chamberlain Field; Chattanooga, TN	W 22–3	8,806	
October 13	at No. 12 The Citadel		Johnson Hagood Stadium; Charleston, SC	W 7–6	19,522	
October 20	at Marshall		Fairfield Stadium; Huntington, WV	W 29–23	15,581	
October 27	Appalachian State	No. T–20	Chamberlain Field; Chattanooga, TN	L 17–23	7,527	
November 3	Western Carolina		Chamberlain Field; Chattanooga, TN	W 23–21	5,203	
November 10	No. 7 Georgia Southern*		Chamberlain Field; Chattanooga, TN	L 20–23	5,710	
November 17	at Western Kentucky*		L. T. Smith Stadium; Bowling Green, KY	W 22–21	3,900	
*Non-conference game; ^{†}Homecoming; Rankings from NCAA Division I-AA Football Committee Poll released prior to the game
