= 1990 VMI Keydets football team =

American college football season

1990 VMI Keydets football
- Conference: Southern Conference
- Record: 4–7 (1–5 SoCon)
- Head coach: Jim Shuck (2nd season)
- Home stadium: Alumni Memorial Field

1990 Southern Conference football standings
	Conf.					Overall
Team	W		L		T	W		L		T
No. 12 Furman $^	6	–	1	–	0	9	–	4	–	0
Appalachian State	5	–	2	–	0	6	–	5	–	0
Chattanooga	4	–	2	–	0	6	–	5	–	0
No. 15 The Citadel ^	4	–	3	–	0	7	–	5	–	0
Marshall	4	–	3	–	0	6	–	5	–	0
Western Carolina	2	–	5	–	0	3	–	8	–	0
VMI	1	–	5	–	0	4	–	7	–	0
East Tennessee State	1	–	6	–	0	2	–	9	–	0
$ – Conference champion; ^ – NCAA Division I-AA playoff participant; Rankings from NCAA Division I-AA Football Committee poll

The 1990 VMI Keydets football team was an American football team that represented the Virginia Military Institute (VMI) as a member of the Southern Conference (SoCon) during the 1990 NCAA Division I-AA football season. In their second year under head coach Jim Shuck, the team compiled an overall record of 4–7, with a mark of 1–5 in conference play, placing seventh in the SoCon.

== Schedule ==
Date	Opponent	Site	Result	Attendance	Source
September 1	Catawba*	Alumni Memorial Field; Lexington, VA	W 24–7	5,100	
September 8	at Western Carolina	E. J. Whitmire Stadium; Cullowhee, NC	L 20–28	6,752	
September 15	James Madison*	Alumni Memorial Field; Lexington, VA	W 24–21	7,850	
September 22	at Army*	Michie Stadium; West Point, NY	L 17–41	33,839	
October 6	at Furman	Paladin Stadium; Greenville, SC	L 22–51	14,242	
October 13	vs. No. 16 William & Mary*	Foreman Field; Norfolk, VA (Oyster Bowl, rivalry)	L 47–59	19,000	
October 20	West Virginia Tech*	Alumni Memorial Field; Lexington, VA	W 66–27	6,426	
October 27	Marshall	Alumni Memorial Field; Lexington, VA	L 7–52	5,391	
November 3	at No. 15 The Citadel	Johnson Hagood Stadium; Charleston, SC (rivalry)	L 3–23	19,754	
November 10	Appalachian State	Alumni Memorial Field; Lexington, VA	L 0–17	4,463	
November 17	at East Tennessee State	Memorial Center; Johnson City, TN	W 21–20		
*Non-conference game; Rankings from NCAA Division I-AA Football Committee Poll released prior to the game
