= 1990 Murray State Racers football team =

American college football season

1990 Murray State Racers football
- Conference: Ohio Valley Conference
- Record: 2–9 (1–5 OVC)
- Head coach: Mike Mahoney (4th season)
- Home stadium: Roy Stewart Stadium

1990 Ohio Valley Conference football standings
	Conf.					Overall
Team	W		L		T	W		L		T
No. 1 Middle Tennessee +^	5	–	1	–	0	11	–	2	–	0
No. 5 Eastern Kentucky +^	5	–	1	–	0	10	–	2	–	0
Tennessee State	4	–	2	–	0	7	–	4	–	0
Tennessee Tech	3	–	3	–	0	6	–	5	–	0
Morehead State	3	–	3	–	0	5	–	6	–	0
Murray State	1	–	5	–	0	2	–	9	–	0
Austin Peay	0	–	6	–	0	0	–	11	–	0
+ – Conference co-champions; ^ – NCAA Division I-AA playoff participant; Rankings from NCAA Division I-AA Football Committee poll

The 1990 Murray State Racers football team represented Murray State University during the 1990 NCAA Division I-AA football season as a member of the Ohio Valley Conference (OVC). Led by fourth-year head coach Mike Mahoney, the Racers compiled an overall record of 2–9, with a mark of 1–5 in conference play, and finished sixth in the OVC.

== Schedule ==
Date	Opponent	Site	Result	Attendance	Source
September 8	at Louisville*	Cardinal Stadium; Louisville, KY	L 0–68	34,417	
September 15	at Southern Illinois*	McAndrew Stadium; Carbondale, IL	L 7–45	10,000	
September 22	Eastern Illinois*	Roy Stewart Stadium; Murray, KY	W 14–10	7,184	
September 29	Tennessee Tech	Roy Stewart Stadium; Murray, KY	L 3–16	5,043	
October 6	at Indiana State*	Memorial Stadium; Terre Haute, IN	L 0–52	5,089	
October 13	No. 1 Eastern Kentucky	Roy Stewart Stadium; Murray, KY	L 0–42		
October 20	at Northern Illinois*	Huskie Stadium; Dekalb, IL	L 7–49	15,987	
October 27	Tennessee State	Roy Stewart Stadium; Murray, KY	L 17–23		
November 3	at Morehead State	Jayne Stadium; Morehead, KY	L 6–69		
November 10	No. 3 Middle Tennessee	Roy Stewart Stadium; Murray, KY	L 10–31		
November 17	at Austin Peay	Municipal Stadium; Clarksville, TN	W 31–24		
*Non-conference game; Rankings from NCAA Division I-AA Football Committee Poll released prior to the game
