= 1990 East Tennessee State Buccaneers football team =

American college football season

1990 East Tennessee State Buccaneers football
- Conference: Southern Conference
- Record: 2–9 (1–6 SoCon)
- Head coach: Don Riley (3rd season)
- Home stadium: Memorial Center

1990 Southern Conference football standings
	Conf.					Overall
Team	W		L		T	W		L		T
No. 12 Furman $^	6	–	1	–	0	9	–	4	–	0
Appalachian State	5	–	2	–	0	6	–	5	–	0
Chattanooga	4	–	2	–	0	6	–	5	–	0
No. 15 The Citadel ^	4	–	3	–	0	7	–	5	–	0
Marshall	4	–	3	–	0	6	–	5	–	0
Western Carolina	2	–	5	–	0	3	–	8	–	0
VMI	1	–	5	–	0	4	–	7	–	0
East Tennessee State	1	–	6	–	0	2	–	9	–	0
$ – Conference champion; ^ – NCAA Division I-AA playoff participant; Rankings from NCAA Division I-AA Football Committee poll

The 1990 East Tennessee State Buccaneers football team was an American football team that represented East Tennessee State University as a member of the Southern Conference (SoCon) during the 1990 NCAA Division I-AA football season. Led by third-year head coach Don Riley, the Buccaneers compiled and overall record of 2–9, with a mark of 1–6 in conference play, and finished eighth in the SoCon.

== Schedule ==
Date	Opponent	Site	Result	Attendance	Source
September 1	at Appalachian State	Kidd Brewer Stadium; Boone, NC	L 24–34	14,830	
September 8	Samford*	Memorial Center; Johnson City, TN	L 13–17		
September 15	at No. 11 Middle Tennessee*	Johnny "Red" Floyd Stadium; Murfreesboro, TN	L 14–48	12,000	
September 22	at Western Carolina	E. J. Whitmire Stadium; Cullowhee, NC	L 17–21	5,928	
October 6	at Chattanooga	Chamberlain Field; Chattanooga, TN	L 3–22	8,806	
October 13	No. 17 Marshall	Memorial Center; Johnson City, TN	W 38–17	4,422	
October 20	No. 10 (D-II) Valdosta State*	Memorial Center; Johnson City, TN	W 37–22		
October 27	at No. 16 The Citadel	Johnson Hagood Stadium; Charleston, SC	L 15–35	13,217	
November 3	Wofford*	Memorial Center; Johnson City, TN	L 46–64		
November 10	No. 15 Furman	Memorial Center; Johnson City, TN	L 13–29		
November 17	VMI	Memorial Center; Johnson City, TN	L 20–21		
*Non-conference game; Rankings from NCAA Division I-AA Football Committee Poll released prior to the game
