= Ty Disney =

American football player and coach (1908–1962)

Biographical details
- Born: April 13, 1908
- Died: November 10, 1962 (aged 54)

Playing career

Football
- 1929–1931: Tennessee
- Position: Halfback

Coaching career (HC unless noted)

Football
- 1933–1934: Benham HS (KY)
- 1935–1936: Greeneville HS (TN)
- 1937: Tusculum
- 1940–1954: Greeneville HS (TN)

Basketball
- 1937–1938: Tusculum

Head coaching record
- Overall: 0–5–3 (college football 1–10 (college basketball); 88–41–10 (high school football)

Theodore E. "Ty" Disney (April 13, 1908 – November 10, 1962) was an American football player and coach. He played halfback at the University of Tennessee. He served as the head football coach at Tusculum College in Greeneville, Tennessee in 1937. He also served as the school's men's basketball coach during the 1937–38 season.

== Head coaching record ==
=== College football ===
Year	Team	Overall	Conference	Standing	Bowl/playoffs
Tusculum Pioneers (Smoky Mountain Conference) (1937)
1937	Tusculum	0–5–3	0–5–2	8th	
Tusculum:		0–5–3	0–5–2		
Total:		0–5–3			
