= George Downing (coach) =

American sports coach (1897–1973)

Biographical details
- Born: May 30, 1897; Fayette County, Kentucky, U.S.
- Died: May 9, 1973 (aged 75); Lexington, Kentucky, U.S.

Playing career

Football
- 1917: Kentucky

Coaching career (HC unless noted)

Football
- 1923: Tusculum
- 1924–1935: Morehead State

Basketball
- 1923–1924: Tusculum
- 1929–1936: Morehead State

Baseball
- 1927–1936: Morehead State

Administrative career (AD unless noted)
- 1926–1936: Morehead State

Head coaching record
- Overall: 29–37–3 (football); 38–20 (baseball)

George Dewey Downing (May 30, 1897 – May 9, 1973) was an American football, basketball and baseball coach. He served as the head football coach at Tusculum College—now known as Tusculum University—Tusculum, Tennessee and Morehead State University in Morehead, Kentucky from 1927 to 1935, compiling a career college football coaching record of 29–37–3. Downing was the head basketball coach as Tusculum in 1923–24 and at Morehead State from 1929 to 1936. He was also the head baseball coach at Morehead State from 1927 to 1936, tallying a mark of 38–20.
