= 1990 Nicholls State Colonels football team =

American college football season

1990 Nicholls State Colonels football
- Conference: Independent
- Record: 5–6
- Head coach: Phil Greco (4th season)
- Home stadium: John L. Guidry Stadium

1990 NCAA Division I-AA independents football standings
	Conf.			Overall
Team	W	L	T	W		L		T
No. 2 Youngstown State ^		–		11	–	1	–	0
No. 7 William & Mary ^		–		10	–	2	–	0
No. 3 Georgia Southern ^		–		9	–	3	–	0
No. 18 UCF ^		–		9	–	3	–	0
Liberty		–		7	–	4	–	0
Samford		–		6	–	4	–	1
James Madison		–		5	–	6	–	0
Nicholls State		–		5	–	6	–	0
Arkansas State		–		3	–	7	–	1
Western Kentucky		–		2	–	8	–	0
Towson State		–		2	–	9	–	0
Northeastern		–		1	–	10	–	0
^ – NCAA Division I-AA playoff participant; Rankings from NCAA Division I-AA Football Committee poll

The 1990 Nicholls State Colonels football team represented Nicholls State University as an independent during the 1990 NCAA Division I-AA football season. Led by fourth-year head coach Phil Greco, the Colonels compiled a record of 5–6. Nicholls State played home games at John L. Guidry Stadium in Thibodaux, Louisiana.

== Schedule ==
Date	Opponent	Site	Result	Attendance	Source
September 1	McNeese State	John L. Guidry Stadium; Thibodaux, LA	W 31–24		
September 8	at Southwestern Louisiana	Cajun Field; Lafayette, LA	L 21–24	22,131	
September 15	at Northwestern State	Harry Turpin Stadium; Natchitoches, LA (rivalry)	W 19–7		
September 22	Stephen F. Austin	John L. Guidry Stadium; Thibodaux, LA	W 23–41 (forfeit win)		
September 29	at Southwest Texas State	Bobcat Stadium; San Marcos, TX (rivalry)	L 30–33		
October 6	Sam Houston State	John L. Guidry Stadium; Thibodaux, LA	W 28–16		
October 20	Northeast Louisiana	John L. Guidry Stadium; Thibodaux, LA	L 20–27		
October 27	at Northern Arizona	Walkup Skydome; Flagstaff, AZ	L 34–41	9,160	
November 3	No. 2 Mississippi College	John L. Guidry Stadium; Thibodaux, LA	L 20–31		
November 10	at Troy State	Veterans Memorial Stadium; Troy, AL	L 23–24	3,000	
November 17	Southern	John L. Guidry Stadium; Thibodaux, LA	W 23–19		
Rankings from NCAA Division II Football Committee Poll released prior to the game
