= Tusculum Pioneers football =

College football team

- First season: 1901; 125 years ago (Note: The team was disbanded in 1950, then it was relaunched in 1991; 35 years ago.)
- Athletic director: Josh Ealy
- Head coach: Billy Taylor; 2nd season, 2–18 (.100)
- Location: Tusculum, Tennessee
- Stadium: Pioneer Field (capacity: 3,500)
- NCAA division: Division II
- Conference: South Atlantic
- Colors: Orange and black
- All-time record: 240–366–30 (.401)

Conference championships
- 3
- Mascot: Pioneers
- Website: tusculumpioneers.com

The Tusculum Pioneers football team represents Tusculum University in college football at the NCAA Division II level. The Pioneers are members of the South Atlantic Conference (SAC), fielding its team in the SAC since 1998. The Pioneers play their home games at Pioneer Field in Tusculum, Tennessee.

Their head coach was Jerry Odom from 2016 to 2023.

== Conference affiliations ==
- Independent (1901–1926)
- Smoky Mountain Conference (1927–1940)
- Independent (1941–1948)
- Smoky Mountain Conference (1949–1950)
- Mid-South Conference (1991–1995)
- South Atlantic Conference (1998–present)

== List of head coaches ==
=== Key ===
Key to symbols in coaches list
General		Overall		Conference		Postseason (Note: Although the first Rose Bowl Game was played in 1902, it has been continuously played since the 1916 game, and is recognized as the oldest bowl game by the NCAA. "—" indicates any season prior to 1916 when postseason games were not played.)	
No.	Order of coaches (Note: A running total of the number of head coaches, with coaches who served separate tenures being counted only once. Interim head coaches are represented with "Int" and are not counted in the running total. "—" indicates the team played but either without a coach or no coach is on record. "X" indicates an interim year without play.)	GC	Games coached	CW	Conference wins	PW	Postseason wins
DC	Division championships	OW	Overall wins	CL	Conference losses	PL	Postseason losses
CC	Conference championships	OL	Overall losses	CT	Conference ties	PT	Postseason ties
NC	National championships	OT	Overall ties (Note: Overtime rules in college football were introduced in 1996, making ties impossible in the period since.)	C%	Conference winning percentage		
†	Elected to the College Football Hall of Fame	O%	Overall winning percentage (Note: When computing the win–loss percentage, a tie counts as half a win and half a loss.)				

=== Coaches ===
List of head football coaches showing season(s) coached, overall records and conference records
No.	Name	Season(s)	GC	OW	OL	OT	O%	CW	CL	CT	C%
1	Unknown	1901–1902, 1904–1906, 1909, 1913–1914, 1917–1918	29	13	12	4	0.392	–	–	–	–
2	Stephen Andrew Lynch	1903	2	1	1	0	0.500	–	–	–	–
3	Fitzhugh W. Gregg	1908	4	0	3	1	0.125	–	–	–	–
4	J. Bruce Anderson	1915–1916	10	5	4	1	0.550	–	–	–	–
5	Sam Doak	1919–1921, 1928–1936	88	31	41	16	0.443	12	23	7	0.369
6	Hal Blair	1922	8	4	4	0	0.500	–	–	–	–
7	George Downing	1923	6	1	5	0	0.167	–	–	–	–
8	Tom McCann	1924	8	4	4	0	0.500	–	–	–	–
9	Sam Graham	1925	7	2	5	0	0.286	–	–	–	–
10	Carlton Palmer	1926–1927	16	6	8	2	0.438	–	–	–	–
11	Ty Disney	1937	8	0	5	3	0.188	0	5	2	0.143
12	Johnny Faulds	1938–1939	17	0	15	2	0.059	0	10	0	.000
13	Laird Holt	1940–1941	17	4	13	0	0.235	0	4	0	.000
14	Marion Edens	1946	8	1	7	0	0.125	–	–	–	–
15	Tom Armstrong	1947–1950	33	6	26	1	.197}	0	7	1	0.063
16	Tom Bryant	1991–1994	40	16	24	0	0.400	7	14	0	0.333
17	Dewayne Wells	1995–1997	30	6	24	0	0.200	3	5	0	0.375
18	Frankie DeBusk	1998–2015	196	96	100	0	0.490	50	70	0	0.417
19	Jerry Odom	2016–2023	89	42	47	0	0.472	32	32	0	0.500
20	Billy Taylor	2024–present	20	2	18	0	0.100	1	15	0	0.063

== Year-by-year results ==
National champions	Conference champions	Bowl game berth	Playoff berth

Season	Year	Head coach	Association	Division	Conference	Record							Postseason	Final ranking
Season	Year	Head coach	Association	Division	Conference	Overall			Conference				Postseason	Final ranking
Season	Year	Head coach	Association	Division	Conference	Win	Loss	Tie	Finish	Win	Loss	Tie	Postseason	Final ranking
Tusculum Pioneers
1901	1901	Unknown	—	—	Independent								—	—
1902	1902	Unknown	—	—	Independent	0	1	0					—	—
1903	1903	Stephen Andrew Lynch	—	—	Independent	1	1	0					—	—
1904	1904	Unknown	—	—	Independent	2	1	0					—	—
1905	1905	Unknown	—	—	Independent	1	0	0					—	—
1906	1906	Unknown	IAAUS	—	Independent	2	2	1					—	—
No team in 1907
1908	1908	Fitzhugh W. Gregg	IAAUS	—	Independent	0	3	1					—	—
1909	1909	Unknown	IAAUS	—	Independent	0	3	1					—	—
No team from 1910 to 1912
1913	1913	Unknown	NCAA	—	Independent	1	2	0					—	—
1914	1914	Unknown	NCAA	—	Independent	2	1	1					—	—
1915	1915	J. Bruce Anderson	NCAA	—	Independent	3	1	1					—	—
1916	1916	J. Bruce Anderson	NCAA	—	Independent	2	3	0					—	—
1917	1917	Unknown	NCAA	—	Independent	2	2	1					—	—
1918	1918	Unknown	NCAA	—	Independent	3	0	0					—	—
1919	1919	Sam Doak	NCAA	—	Independent	2	3	1					—	—
1920	1920	Sam Doak	NCAA	—	Independent	1	5	0					—	—
1921	1921	Sam Doak	NCAA	—	Independent	0	3	4					—	—
1922	1922	Hal Blair	NCAA	—	Independent	4	4	0					—	—
1923	1923	George Downing	NCAA	—	Independent	1	5	0					—	—
1924	1924	Tom McCann	NCAA	—	Independent	4	4	0					—	—
1925	1925	Sam Graham	NCAA	—	Independent	2	5	0					—	—
1926	1926	Carlton Palmer	NCAA	—	Independent	6	3	0					—	—
1927	1927	Carlton Palmer	NCAA	—	SMC	0	5	2					—	—
1928	1928	Sam Doak	NCAA	—	SMC	4	2	2	3rd	2	2	1	—	—
1929	1929	Sam Doak	NCAA	—	SMC	2	3	3					—	—
1930	1930	Sam Doak	NCAA	—	SMC	2	5	1	6th	1	3	1	—	—
1931	1931	Sam Doak	NCAA	—	SMC	6	1	1	3rd	2	1	1	—	—
1932	1932	Sam Doak	NCAA	—	SMC	5	2	0	3rd	3	2	0	—	—
1933	1933	Sam Doak	NCAA	—	SMC	2	3	2	4th	1	2	2	—	—
1934	1934	Sam Doak	NCAA	—	SMC	5	2	1	2nd	3	2	1	—	—
1935	1935	Sam Doak	NCAA	—	SMC	2	5	1	8th	0	5	1	—	—
1936	1936	Sam Doak	NCAA	—	SMC	0	7	0	T–8th	0	6	0	—	—
1937	1937	Ty Disney	NCAA	—	SMC	0	5	3	8th	0	5	2	—	—
1938	1938	Johnny Faulds	NCAA	—	SMC	0	8	1	8th	0	5	0	—	—
1939	1939	Johnny Faulds	NCAA	—	SMC	0	7	1	6th	0	5	0	—	—
1940	1940	Laird Holt	NCAA	—	SMC	1	7	0	6th	0	4	0	—	—
1941	1941	Laird Holt	NCAA	—		3	6	0					—	—
No team from 1942 to 1945
1946	1946	Marion Edens	NCAA	—		1	7	0					—	—
1947	1947	Tom Armstrong	NCAA	—		0	8	0					—	—
1948	1948	Tom Armstrong	NCAA	—		2	7	0					—	—
1949	1949	Tom Armstrong	NCAA	—	SMC	2	5	1	5th	0	3	1	—	—
1950	1950	Tom Armstrong	NCAA	—	SMC	2	6	0	5th	0	4	0	—	—
No team from 1951 to 1990
1991	1991	Tom Bryant	NAIA	Division II	MSC	0	10	0	7th	0	6	0	—	—
1992	1992	Tom Bryant	NAIA	Division II	MSC	4	6	0	4th	2	3	0	—	—
1993	1993	Tom Bryant	NAIA	Division II	MSC	5	5	0	T–3rd	2	3	0	—	—
1994	1994	Tom Bryant	NAIA	Division II	MSC	7	3	0	T–2nd	3	2	0	—	—
1995	1995	Dewayne Wells	NAIA	Division II	MSC	3	6	0	6th	3	5	0	—	—
1996	1996	Dewayne Wells	—	—	—	1	9	0					—	—
1997	1997	Dewayne Wells	—	—	—	2	9	0					—	—
1998	1998	Frankie DeBusk	NCAA	Division II	SAC	5	6	0	—	0	0	0	—	—
1999	1999	Frankie DeBusk	NCAA	Division II	SAC	2	9	0	9th	0	8	0	—	—
2000	2000	Frankie DeBusk	NCAA	Division II	SAC	7	4	0	4th	4	3	0	—	—
2001	2001	Frankie DeBusk	NCAA	Division II	SAC	8	2	0	2nd	5	3	0	—	18
2002	2002	Frankie DeBusk	NCAA	Division II	SAC	7	4	0	5th	3	4	0	—	—
2003	2003	Frankie DeBusk	NCAA	Division II	SAC	9	2	0	T–1st	6	1	0	Conference co-champions	—
2004	2004	Frankie DeBusk	NCAA	Division II	SAC	6	4	0	T–2nd	4	3	0	—	—
2005	2005	Frankie DeBusk	NCAA	Division II	SAC	3	7	0	8th	1	6	0	—	—
2006	2006	Frankie DeBusk	NCAA	Division II	SAC	6	5	0	T–5th	3	4	0	—	—
2007	2007	Frankie DeBusk	NCAA	Division II	SAC	6	5	0	T–3rd	4	2	0	—	—
2008	2008	Frankie DeBusk	NCAA	Division II	SAC	9	4	0	T–1st	5	2	0	L NCAA Division II Second Round	16
2009	2009	Frankie DeBusk	NCAA	Division II	SAC	3	7	0	T–6th	2	5	0	—	—
2010	2010	Frankie DeBusk	NCAA	Division II	SAC	6	5	0	7th	2	5	0	—	—
2011	2011	Frankie DeBusk	NCAA	Division II	SAC	3	8	0	T–6th	2	5	0	—	—
2012	2012	Frankie DeBusk	NCAA	Division II	SAC	2	9	0	T–7th	1	6	0	—	—
2013	2013	Frankie DeBusk	NCAA	Division II	SAC	4	7	0	T–6th	2	5	0	—	—
2014	2014	Frankie DeBusk	NCAA	Division II	SAC	6	5	0	3rd	4	3	0	—	—
2015	2015	Frankie DeBusk	NCAA	Division II	SAC	4	7	0	7th	2	5	0	—	—
2016	2016	Jerry Odom	NCAA	Division II	SAC	4	7	0	T–4th	3	4	0	—	—
2017	2017	Jerry Odom	NCAA	Division II	SAC	5	5	0	T–4th	3	4	0	—	—
2018	2018	Jerry Odom	NCAA	Division II	SAC	5	5	0	T–3rd	4	3	0	—	—
2019	2019	Jerry Odom	NCAA	Division II	SAC	5	6	0	T–4th	4	4	0	—	—
2020–21	2020–21	Jerry Odom	NCAA	Division II	SAC	4	1	0	1st (Mountain)	2	0	0	Conference champion	—
2021	2021	Jerry Odom	NCAA	Division II	SAC	5	6	0	7th	3	5	0	—	—
2022	2022	Jerry Odom	NCAA	Division II	SAC	8	3	0	2nd (Mountain)	6	3	0	—	—
2023	2023	Jerry Odom	NCAA	Division II	SAC	6	5	0	T–1st (Mountain)	6	2	0	—	—
2024	2024	Billy Taylor	NCAA	Division II	SAC	1	9	0	T–5th (Mountain)	1	7	0	—	—
2025	2025	Billy Taylor	NCAA	Division II	SAC	1	9	0	10th	0	8	0	—	—
