= 1990 Eastern Kentucky Colonels football team =

American college football season

1990 Eastern Kentucky Colonels football

OVC co-champion

NCAA Division I-AA First Round, L 17–45 vs. Furman
- Conference: Ohio Valley Conference
- Record: 10–2 (5–1 OVC)
- Head coach: Roy Kidd (27th season)
- Home stadium: Hanger Field

1990 Ohio Valley Conference football standings
	Conf.					Overall
Team	W		L		T	W		L		T
No. 1 Middle Tennessee +^	5	–	1	–	0	11	–	2	–	0
No. 5 Eastern Kentucky +^	5	–	1	–	0	10	–	2	–	0
Tennessee State	4	–	2	–	0	7	–	4	–	0
Tennessee Tech	3	–	3	–	0	6	–	5	–	0
Morehead State	3	–	3	–	0	5	–	6	–	0
Murray State	1	–	5	–	0	2	–	9	–	0
Austin Peay	0	–	6	–	0	0	–	11	–	0
+ – Conference co-champions; ^ – NCAA Division I-AA playoff participant; Tennessee State's game against Jackson State and Morehead State's game against Western Kentucky were designated as conference games and counted in the OVC standings.; Rankings from NCAA Division I-AA Football Committee poll

The 1990 Eastern Kentucky Colonels football team represented Eastern Kentucky University as a member of the Ohio Valley Conference (OVC) during the 1990 NCAA Division I-AA football season. Led by 27th-year head coach Roy Kidd, the Colonels compiled an overall record of 10–2, with a mark of 5–1 in conference play, and finished as OVC co-champion. Eastern Kentucky advanced to the NCAA Division I-AA First Round and were defeated by Furman.

== Schedule ==
Date	Opponent	Rank	Site	Result	Attendance	Source
September 8	UCF*		Hanger Field; Richmond, KY	W 24–12	19,200	
September 15	Southeast Missouri State*		Hanger Field; Richmond, KY	W 45–0		
September 22	at Georgia Southern*	No. 8	Paulson Stadium; Statesboro, GA	W 42–34	17,373	
September 29	at No. 19 Western Kentucky*	No. 7	L. T. Smith Stadium; Bowling Green, KY (rivalry)	W 35–12	18,000	
October 6	at No. 1 Middle Tennessee	No. 4	Johnny "Red" Floyd Stadium; Murfreesboro, TN	W 10–7		
October 13	at Murray State	No. 1	Roy Stewart Stadium; Murray, KY	W 42–0		
October 20	Tennessee State	No. 1	Hanger Field; Richmond, KY	W 55–17	20,800	
October 27	Tennessee Tech	No. 1	Hanger Field; Richmond, KY	W 29–20		
November 3	at Austin Peay	No. 1	Municipal Stadium; Clarksville, TN	W 38–14	2,068	
November 10	at No. 18 Marshall*	No. 1	Fairfield Stadium; Huntington, WV	W 15–12	16,517	
November 17	Morehead State	No. 1	Hanger Field; Richmond, KY (rivalry)	L 17–27		
November 24	No. 12 Furman*	No. 5	Hanger Field; Richmond, KY (NCAA Division I-AA First Round)	L 17–45	4,528	
*Non-conference game; Rankings from NCAA Division I-AA Football Committee Poll released prior to the game
