= Frankie DeBusk =

American football coach and player (born 1969)

Current position
- Title: Athletic director
- Team: Dobyns-Bennett HS (TN)

Biographical details
- Born: c. 1969 (age 56–57); Greenville, Tennessee, U.S.
- Education: Furman University (1991)

Playing career
- 1987–1990: Furman
- Position: Quarterback

Coaching career (HC unless noted)
- 1991: Furman (GA)
- 1992: Furman (WR)
- 1993–1995: Chattanooga (QB/WR)
- 1996–1997: Chattanooga (OC/QB)
- 1998–2015: Tusculum

Administrative career (AD unless noted)
- 2007: Tusculum (interim AD)
- 2007–2015: Tusculum
- 2019–present: Dobyns-Bennett HS (TN)

Head coaching record
- Overall: 96–100
- Tournaments: 1–1 (NCAA D-II playoffs)

Accomplishments and honors

Championships
- 2 SAC (2003, 2008)

Awards
- First Team All-SoCon (1989–1990); SoCon Offensive Player of the Year (1990); Furman Hall of Fame (1997); Tusculum Hall of Fame (2023)

Frank T. DeBusk (born c. 1969) is an American former college football coach and player. He was the head football coach at Tusculum University in Greeneville, Tennessee, from 1998 to 2015.

== Playing career ==
DeBusk was the starting quarterback for Furman, where he was a member of the 1988 Furman Paladins football team, which defeated Georgia Southern in the 1988 NCAA Division I-AA Football Championship Game. He was a two-time First Team All-Southern Conference (SoCon) selection in 1989 and 1990. During his senior year, he was also named the SoCon Offensive Player of the Year.

== Coaching career ==
1991, DeBusk began his coaching career as a graduate assistant for his alma mater, Furman. In 1992, he returned as a restricted earnings wide receivers coach. In 1993, he was hired as the quarterbacks coach and wide receivers coach for Chattanooga. While in that position he coached future National Football League (NFL) Hall of Famer Terrell Owens. In 1996, he was promoted to offensive coordinator and retained his role as quarterbacks coach. After two seasons he was hired as the head football coach for Tusculum. In eighteen seasons as head coach he led the team to a 96–100 record. He also won two South Atlantic Conference (SAC) titles, including the team's first-ever in 2003. He finished with 96 wins which was good enough for first all-time in Tusculum history. He was fired following the 2015 season.

== Athletic director career and honors ==
In 2007, DeBusk was named interim athletic director for Tusculum. He was promoted as the full-time athletic director later that same year. He maintained that position until he resigned in September 2015. In 2019, he was hired as the athletic director for Dobyns-Bennett High School.

In 1997, DeBusk was inducted into the Furman Hall of Fame. In 2023, he was inducted into the Tusculum Hall of Fame.

== Head coaching record ==
Year	Team	Overall	Conference	Standing	Bowl/playoffs	AFCA^{#}
Tusculum Pioneers (South Atlantic Conference) (1998–2015)
1998	Tusculum	5–6	0–0 (Note: Provisional conference member as Tusculum transitioned from the NAIA to the NCAA Division II)	N/A		
1999	Tusculum	2–9	0–8	9th		
2000	Tusculum	7–4	4–3	4th		
2001	Tusculum	8–2	5–3	2nd		18
2002	Tusculum	7–4	3–4	5th		
2003	Tusculum	9–2	6–1	T–1st		17
2004	Tusculum	6–4	4–3	T–2nd		
2005	Tusculum	3–7	1–6	8th		
2006	Tusculum	6–5	3–4	T–5th		
2007	Tusculum	6–5	4–2	T–3rd		
2008	Tusculum	9–4	5–2	T–1st	L NCAA Division II Second Round	16
2009	Tusculum	3–7	2–5	T–6th		
2010	Tusculum	6–5	2–5	7th		
2011	Tusculum	3–8	2–5	T–6th		
2012	Tusculum	2–9	1–6	T–7th		
2013	Tusculum	4–7	2–5	T–6th		
2014	Tusculum	6–5	4–3	3rd		
2015	Tusculum	4–7	2–5	7th		
Tusculum:		96–100	50–70			
Total:		96–100				
National championship Conference title Conference division title or championship game berth
