= List of Ivy League football champions =

This is a list of yearly Ivy League football champions.

== Champions by year ==
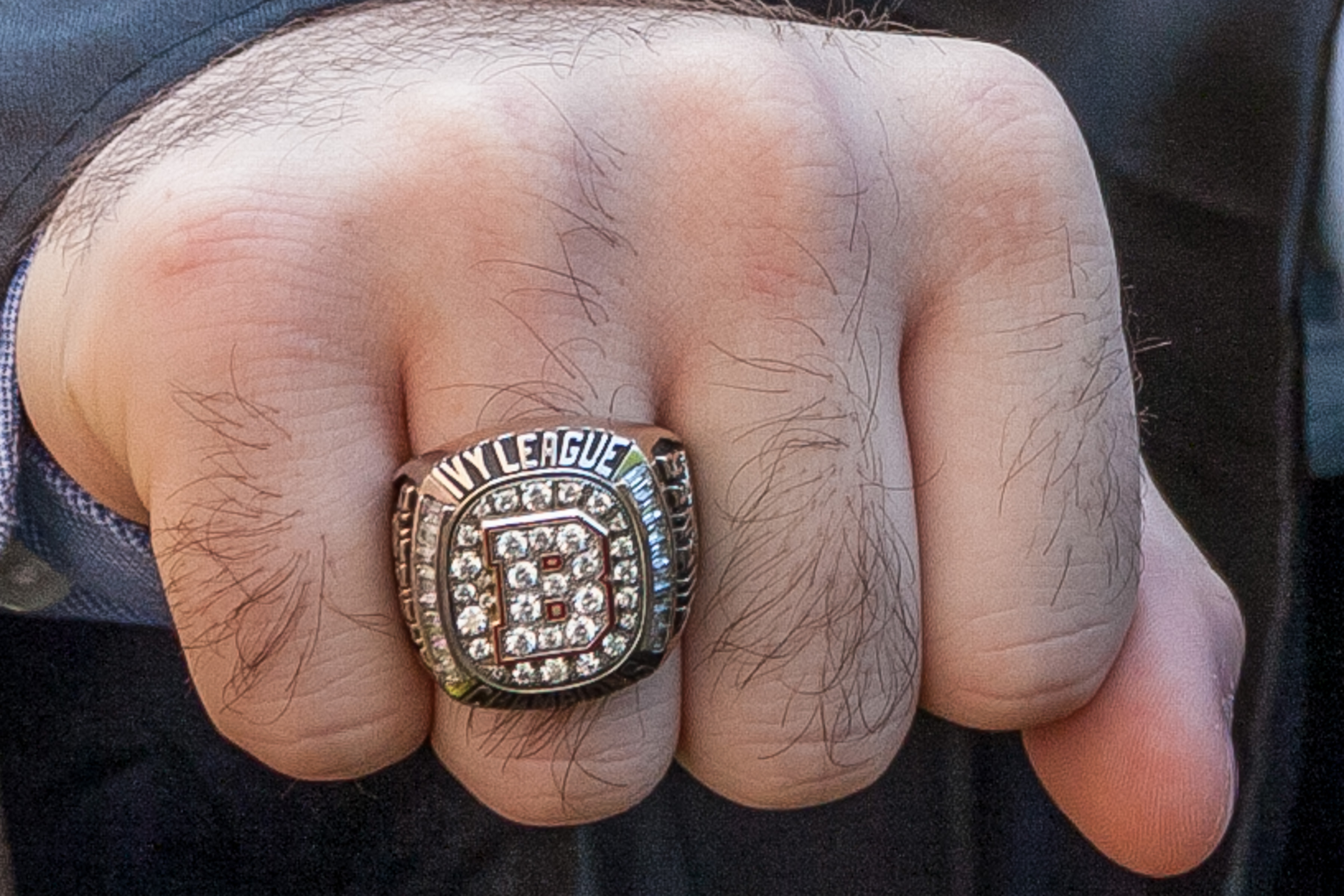
A Brown University player's 2005 Ivy Championship ring

Year	Champions	Conference record	Overall record
1956	Yale	7–0	8–1
1957	Princeton	6–1	7–2
1958	Dartmouth	6–1	7–2
1959	Penn	6–1	7–1–1
1960	Yale	7–0	9–0
1961	Columbia	6–1	6–3
1961	Harvard	6–1	6–3
1962	Dartmouth	7–0	9–0
1963	Dartmouth	5–2	7–2
1963	Princeton	5–2	7–2
1964	Princeton	7–0	9–0
1965	Dartmouth	7–0	9–0
1966	Harvard	6–1	8–1
1966	Dartmouth	6–1	7–2
1966	Princeton	6–1	7–2
1967	Yale	7–0	8–1
1968	Harvard	6–0–1	8–0–1
1968	Yale	6–0–1	8–0–1
1969	Dartmouth	6–1	8–1
1969	Yale	6–1	7–2
1969	Princeton	6–1	6–3
1970	Dartmouth	7–0	9–0
1971	Cornell	6–1	8–1
1971	Dartmouth	6–1	8–1
1972	Dartmouth	5–1–1	7–1–1
1973	Dartmouth	6–1	6–3
1974	Yale	6–1	8–1
1974	Harvard	6–1	7–2
1975	Harvard	6–1	7–2
1976	Brown	6–1	8–1
1976	Yale	6–1	8–1
1977	Yale	6–1	7–2
1978	Dartmouth	6–1	6–3
1979	Yale	6–1	8–1
1980	Yale	6–1	8–2
1981	Yale	6–1	9–1
1981	Dartmouth	6–1	6–4
1982	Dartmouth	5–2	5–5
1982	Harvard	5–2	7–3
1982	Penn	5–2	7–3
1983	Harvard	5–1–1	6–2–2
1983	Penn	5–1–1	6–3–1
1984	Penn	7–0	8–1
1985	Penn	6–1	7–2–1
1986	Penn	7–0	10–0
1987	Harvard	6–1	8–2
1988	Cornell	6–1	7–2–1
1988	Penn	6–1	8–2
1989	Princeton	6–1	7–2–1
1989	Yale	6–1	8–2
1990	Cornell	6–1	7–3
1990	Dartmouth	6–1	7–2–1
1991	Dartmouth	6–0–1	7–2–1
1992	Dartmouth	6–1	8–2
1992	Princeton	6–1	8–2
1993	Penn	7–0	10–0
1994	Penn	7–0	9–0
1995	Princeton	5–1–1	8–1–1
1996	Dartmouth	7–0	10–0
1997	Harvard	7–0	9–1
1998	Penn	6–1	8–2
1999	Brown	6–1	9–1
1999	Yale	6–1	9–1
2000	Penn	6–1	7–3
2001	Harvard	7–0	9–0
2002	Penn	7–0	9–1
2003	Penn	7–0	10–0
2004	Harvard	7–0	10–0
2005	Brown	6–1	9–1
2006	Princeton	6–1	9–1
2006	Yale	6–1	8–2
2007	Harvard	7–0	8–2
2008	Brown	6–1	7–3
2008	Harvard	6–1	9–1
2009	Penn	7–0	8–2
2010	Penn	7–0	9–1
2011	Harvard	7–0	9–1
2012	Penn	6–1	6–4
2013	Harvard	6–1	9–1
2013	Princeton	6–1	8–2
2014	Harvard	7–0	10–0
2015	Dartmouth	6–1	9–1
2015	Harvard	6–1	9–1
2015	Penn	6–1	7–3
2016	Penn	6–1	7–3
2016	Princeton	6–1	8–2
2017	Yale	6–1	9–1
2018	Princeton	7–0	10–0
2019	Dartmouth	6–1	9–1
2019	Yale	6–1	9–1
2020	Season Cancelled due to COVID-19 pandemic	—	—
2021	Dartmouth	6–1	9–1
2021	Princeton	6–1	9–1
2022	Yale	6–1	8–2
2023	Harvard	5–2	8–2
2023	Yale	5–2	7–3
2023	Dartmouth	5–2	6–4
2024	Harvard	5–2	8–2
2024	Dartmouth	5–2	8–2
2024	Columbia	5–2	7–3
2025	Yale	6–1	9-3
2025	Harvard	6–1	9-2

== Championships by team ==
College	Titles	Last
Dartmouth	22	2024
Harvard	20	2025
Yale	19	2025
Penn	18	2016
Princeton	13	2021
Brown	4	2008
Cornell	3	1990
Columbia	2	2024
