= 1990 Colgate Red Raiders football team =

American college football season

1990 Colgate Red Raiders football
- Conference: Patriot League
- Record: 7–4 (3–2 Patriot)
- Head coach: Michael Foley (3rd season)
- Captains: Dave Goodwin; Rick Krichbaum
- Home stadium: Andy Kerr Stadium

1990 Patriot League football standings
| | Conf. | | | | | Overall |
| Team | W | | L | | T | W | | L | | T |
|---|---|---|---|---|---|---|---|---|---|---|
| No. 8 Holy Cross $ | 5 | – | 0 | – | 0 | 9 | – | 1 | – | 1 |
| Bucknell | 3 | – | 2 | – | 0 | 7 | – | 4 | – | 0 |
| Colgate | 3 | – | 2 | – | 0 | 7 | – | 4 | – | 0 |
| Lehigh | 3 | – | 2 | – | 0 | 7 | – | 4 | – | 0 |
| Lafayette | 1 | – | 4 | – | 0 | 4 | – | 7 | – | 0 |
| Fordham | 0 | – | 5 | – | 0 | 1 | – | 9 | – | 0 |
$ – Conference champion; Rankings from NCAA Division I-AA Football Committee poll

The 1990 Colgate Red Raiders football team was an American football team that represented Colgate University during the 1990 NCAA Division I-AA football season. Colgate tied for second in the newly renamed Patriot League.

In its third season under head coach Michael Foley, the team compiled a 7–4 record. Dave Goodwin and Rick Krichbaum were the team captains.

The Red Raiders outscored opponents 296 to 248. Their 3–2 conference record placed them in a three-way tie for second place in the six-team Patriot League standings. This was the first year of competition under the Patriot League banner; the league had been known as the Colonial League since 1986.

The team played its home games at Andy Kerr Stadium in Hamilton, New York.

== Schedule ==
| Date | Opponent | Rank | Site | Result | Attendance | Source |
|---|---|---|---|---|---|---|
| September 1 | at Boston University* | No. 16 | Nickerson Field; Boston, MA | W 21–10 | 4,429 | |
| September 15 | at Rutgers* | No. 16 | Rutgers Stadium; Piscataway, NJ | L 17–28 | 18,215 | |
| September 22 | Cornell* | | Andy Kerr Stadium; Hamilton, NY (rivalry) | W 59–24 | 5,805 | |
| September 29 | Princeton* | | Andy Kerr Stadium; Hamilton, NY | W 39–13 | 4,315 | |
| October 6 | at Yale* | No. 14 | Yale Bowl; New Haven, CT | W 30–7 | 16,634 | |
| October 13 | No. 6 New Hampshire* | No. 11 | Andy Kerr Stadium; Hamilton, NY | L 22–38 | 6,209 | |
| October 20 | at Fordham | | Coffey Field; Bronx, NY | W 31–7 | 6,827 | |
| October 27 | at Bucknell | | Christy Mathewson–Memorial Stadium; Lewisburg, PA | W 28–27 | 8,435 | |
| November 3 | at Lehigh | No. 19 | Goodman Stadium; Bethlehem, PA | L 7–52 | 11,187 | |
| November 10 | Lafayette | | Andy Kerr Stadium; Hamilton, NY | W 36–7 | 1,025 | |
| November 17 | No. 10 Holy Cross | | Andy Kerr Stadium; Hamilton, NY | L 6–35 | 4,576 | |
*Non-conference game; Rankings from NCAA Division I-AA Football Committee Poll released prior to the game
