= 1982 Princeton Tigers football team =

American college football season

1982 Princeton Tigers football
- Conference: Ivy League
- Record: 3–7 (3–4 Ivy)
- Head coach: Frank Navarro (5th season)
- Captains: Victor L. Ruterbusch; Jonathan E. Schultheis
- Home stadium: Palmer Stadium

1982 Ivy League football standings
	Conf.					Overall
Team	W		L		T	W		L		T
Harvard +	5	–	2	–	0	7	–	3	–	0
Penn +	5	–	2	–	0	7	–	3	–	0
Dartmouth +	5	–	2	–	0	5	–	5	–	0
Princeton	3	–	4	–	0	3	–	7	–	0
Yale	3	–	4	–	0	4	–	6	–	0
Brown	3	–	4	–	0	5	–	5	–	0
Cornell	3	–	4	–	0	4	–	6	–	0
Columbia	1	–	6	–	0	1	–	9	–	0
+ – Conference co-champions

The 1982 Princeton Tigers football team was an American football team that represented Princeton University during the 1982 NCAA Division I-AA football season. Princeton tied for fourth place in the Ivy League.

In their fifth year under head coach Frank Navarro, the Tigers compiled a 3–7 record and were outscored 317 to 229. Victor L. Ruterbusch and Jonathan E. Schultheis were the team captains.

Princeton's 3–4 conference record earned it part of a four-way tie for fourth place in the Ivy League standings. The Tigers were outscored 215 to 154 by Ivy opponents.

This was Princeton's first year in Division I-AA, after having competed in the top-level Division I-A and its predecessors since helping to found the sport in 1872.

Princeton played its home games at Palmer Stadium on the university campus in Princeton, New Jersey.

== Schedule ==
Date	Opponent	Site	Result	Attendance	Source
September 18	at Cornell	Schoellkopf Field; Ithaca, NY	W 41–36	11,118	
September 25	at Delaware	Delaware Stadium; Newark, DE	L 17–35	18,147	
October 2	Brown	Palmer Stadium; Princeton, NJ	W 28–23	10,743	
October 9	at Columbia	Baker Field; New York, NY	L 14–35	8,150	
October 16	Army*	Palmer Stadium; Princeton, NJ	L 14–20	21,243	
October 23	Harvard	Palmer Stadium; Princeton, NJ (rivalry)	L 15–27	19,824	
October 30	No. 14 Penn	Palmer Stadium; Princeton, NJ (rivalry)	W 17–14	20,249	
November 6	Lafayette*	Palmer Stadium; Princeton, NJ	L 37–47	12,417	
November 13	at Yale	Yale Bowl; New Haven, CT (rivalry)	L 19–37	28,250	
November 20	Dartmouth	Palmer Stadium; Princeton, NJ	L 20–43	3,200	
*Non-conference game; Rankings from the latest NCAA Division I-AA poll released prior to the game
