= Tosches =

Tosches is a surname. Notable people with the surname include:

- Nick Tosches (1949–2019), American journalist, writer and poet
- Steve Tosches (born c. 1956), American football player and coach
