= 1990 Holy Cross Crusaders football team =

American college football season

1990 Holy Cross Crusaders football

Patriot League champion
- Conference: Patriot League
- Record: 9–1–1 (5–0 Patriot)
- Head coach: Mark Duffner (5th season)
- Defensive coordinator: Kevin Coyle (5th season)
- Captains: Willie Bradford; Craig Callahan; Joe Foy; Mark Gallagher
- Home stadium: Fitton Field

1990 Patriot League football standings
	Conf.					Overall
Team	W		L		T	W		L		T
No. 8 Holy Cross $	5	–	0	–	0	9	–	1	–	1
Bucknell	3	–	2	–	0	7	–	4	–	0
Colgate	3	–	2	–	0	7	–	4	–	0
Lehigh	3	–	2	–	0	7	–	4	–	0
Lafayette	1	–	4	–	0	4	–	7	–	0
Fordham	0	–	5	–	0	1	–	9	–	0
$ – Conference champion; Rankings from NCAA Division I-AA Football Committee poll

The 1990 Holy Cross Crusaders football team was an American football team that represented the College of the Holy Cross during the 1990 NCAA Division I-AA football season. Holy Cross finished first in the newly renamed Patriot League, for its fourth championship in five years of league play.

In their fifth year under head coach Mark Duffner, the Crusaders compiled a 9–1–1 record. Willie Bradford, Craig Callahan, Joe Foy and Mark Gallagher were the team captains.

The Crusaders outscored opponents 339 to 106. Their undefeated (5–0) conference record placed first in the six-team Patriot League standings. This was the first year of competition under the Patriot League banner; the league had been known as the Colonial League since 1986.

The Crusaders were ranked No. 4 in the preseason national Division I-AA rankings, but a 0–1–1 start dropped them out of the top 20 in the first round of in-season rankings. They later returned to the top 20 during their nine-game win streak to finish the season, and were recognized as No. 8 in the final poll, released after their last game. The Crusaders did not participate in the Division I-AA playoffs, as Patriot League rules at the time forbade postseason play.

Holy Cross played its home games at Fitton Field on the college campus in Worcester, Massachusetts.

== Schedule ==
Date	Opponent	Rank	Site	Result	Attendance	Source
September 8	UMass*	No. 4	Fitton Field; Worcester, MA	T 10–10	16,444	
September 15	at Army*	No. 4	Michie Stadium; West Point, NY	L 7–24	30,880	
September 22	at Penn*		Franklin Field; Philadelphia, PA	W 17–3	12,189	
September 29	Harvard*		Fitton Field; Worcester, MA	W 35–14	14,106	
October 6	Dartmouth^{†}*		Fitton Field; Worcester, MA	W 21–10	13,211	
October 13	at Brown*	No. 20	Brown Stadium; Providence, RI	W 55–0	4,700	
October 20	Lehigh^	No. 15	Fitton Field; Worcester, MA	W 34–22	17,848	
October 27	Lafayette	No. 13	Fitton Field; Worcester, MA	W 34–3	8,247	
November 3	Bucknell	No. 11	Fitton Field; Worcester, MA	W 43–14	11,995	
November 10	at Fordham	No. 10	Coffey Field; Bronx, NY (rivalry)	W 48–0	2,857	
November 17	at Colgate	No. 10	Andy Kerr Stadium; Hamilton, NY	W 35–6	4,576	
*Non-conference game; ^{†}Homecoming; ^ Family Weekend; Rankings from NCAA Division I-AA Football Committee Poll released prior to the game
