= 1990 Yale Bulldogs football team =

American college football season

1990 Yale Bulldogs football
- Conference: Ivy League
- Record: 6–4 (5–2 Ivy)
- Head coach: Carmen Cozza (26th season)
- Defensive coordinator: Don Brown (2nd season)
- Home stadium: Yale Bowl

1990 Ivy League football standings
	Conf.					Overall
Team	W		L		T	W		L		T
No. 17 Dartmouth +	6	–	1	–	0	7	–	2	–	1
Cornell +	6	–	1	–	0	7	–	3	–	0
Yale	5	–	2	–	0	6	–	4	–	0
Harvard	3	–	4	–	0	5	–	5	–	0
Penn	3	–	4	–	0	3	–	7	–	0
Princeton	2	–	5	–	0	3	–	7	–	0
Brown	2	–	5	–	0	2	–	8	–	0
Columbia	1	–	6	–	0	1	–	9	–	0
+ – Conference co-champions; Rankings from NCAA Division I-AA Football Committee poll

The 1990 Yale Bulldogs football team represented Yale University in the 1990 NCAA Division I-AA football season. The Bulldogs were led by 26th-year head coach Carmen Cozza, played their home games at the Yale Bowl and finished in third place in the Ivy League with a 5–2 record, 6–4 overall.

== Schedule ==
Date	Opponent	Site	Result	Attendance	Source
September 15	at Brown	Brown Stadium; Providence, RI	W 27–21	10,575	
September 22	Lafayette*	Yale Bowl; New Haven, CT	W 18–17	6,458	
September 29	Connecticut*	Yale Bowl; New Haven, CT	L 7–44	18,859	
October 6	Colgate*	Yale Bowl; New Haven, CT	L 7–30	16,634	
October 13	at Dartmouth	Memorial Field; Hanover, NH	L 17–27	10,130	
October 20	Columbia	Yale Bowl; New Haven, CT	W 31–7	11,132	
October 27	at Penn	Franklin Field; Philadelphia, PA	W 27–10	32,389	
November 3	Cornell	Yale Bowl; New Haven, CT	L 31–41	16,576	
November 10	Princeton	Yale Bowl; New Haven, CT (rivalry)	W 34–7	5,500	
November 17	at Harvard	Harvard Stadium; Boston, MA (The Game)	W 34–19	35,000	
*Non-conference game
