= 1990 Fordham Rams football team =

American college football season

1990 Fordham Rams football
- Conference: Patriot League
- Record: 1–9 (0–5 Patriot)
- Head coach: Larry Glueck (5th season)
- Captains: Craig Jones; Eric Schweiker; Chip Smith; Matt Stover
- Home stadium: Coffey Field

1990 Patriot League football standings
	Conf.					Overall
Team	W		L		T	W		L		T
No. 8 Holy Cross $	5	–	0	–	0	9	–	1	–	1
Bucknell	3	–	2	–	0	7	–	4	–	0
Colgate	3	–	2	–	0	7	–	4	–	0
Lehigh	3	–	2	–	0	7	–	4	–	0
Lafayette	1	–	4	–	0	4	–	7	–	0
Fordham	0	–	5	–	0	1	–	9	–	0
$ – Conference champion; Rankings from NCAA Division I-AA Football Committee poll

The 1990 Fordham Rams football team was an American football team that represented Fordham University during the 1990 NCAA Division I-AA football season. In its first year of Patriot League competition, Fordham finished last in the league.

In their fifth year under head coach Larry Glueck, the Rams compiled a 1–9 record. Craig Jones, Eric Schweiker, Matt Stover and Chip Smith were the team captains.

The Rams were outscored 342 to 147. Their winless (0–5) conference record placed last in the six-team Patriot League standings.

Fordham played its home games at Jack Coffey Field on the university campus in The Bronx, New York City.

== Schedule ==
Date	Opponent	Site	Result	Attendance	Source
September 1	at Hofstra*	Hofstra Stadium; Hempstead, NY	L 16–35		
September 8	at Lehigh	Goodman Stadium; Bethlehem, PA	L 3–35	10,153	
September 22	at Princeton*	Palmer Stadium; Princeton, NJ	L 14–23	4,127	
September 29	at Brown*	Brown Stadium; Providence, RI	W 35–28	4,068	
October 13	at Harvard*	Harvard Stadium; Boston, MA	L 13–19	4,500	
October 20	Colgate	Coffey Field; Bronx, NY	L 7–31	6,827	
October 27	Washington & Jefferson*	Coffey Field; Bronx, NY	L 18–20		
November 3	Lafayette	Coffey Field; Bronx, NY	L 14–59	3,894	
November 10	No. 10 Holy Cross^{†}	Coffey Field; Bronx, NY (rivalry)	L 0–48	2,857	
November 17	at Bucknell	Christy Mathewson–Memorial Stadium; Lewisburg, PA	L 7–44		
*Non-conference game; ^{†}Homecoming; Rankings from NCAA Division I-AA Football Committee Poll released prior to the game
