= 1990 Lafayette Leopards football team =

American college football season

1990 Lafayette Leopards football
- Conference: Patriot League
- Record: 4–7 (1–4 Patriot)
- Head coach: Bill Russo (10th season)
- Captains: Art Bittel; Tom Costello
- Home stadium: Fisher Field

1990 Patriot League football standings
	Conf.					Overall
Team	W		L		T	W		L		T
No. 8 Holy Cross $	5	–	0	–	0	9	–	1	–	1
Bucknell	3	–	2	–	0	7	–	4	–	0
Colgate	3	–	2	–	0	7	–	4	–	0
Lehigh	3	–	2	–	0	7	–	4	–	0
Lafayette	1	–	4	–	0	4	–	7	–	0
Fordham	0	–	5	–	0	1	–	9	–	0
$ – Conference champion; Rankings from NCAA Division I-AA Football Committee poll

The 1990 Lafayette Leopards football team was an American football team that represented Lafayette College during the 1990 NCAA Division I-AA football season. The Leopards finished second-to-last in the newly renamed Patriot League.

In their tenth year under head coach Bill Russo, the Leopards compiled a 4–7 record. Art Bittel and Tom Costello were the team captains.

The Leopards were outscored 318 to 223. Their 1–4 conference record placed fifth in the six-team Patriot League standings. This was the first year of competition under the Patriot League banner; the league had been known as the Colonial League since 1986.

Lafayette played its home games at Fisher Field on College Hill in Easton, Pennsylvania.

== Schedule ==
Date	Opponent	Site	Result	Attendance	Source
September 8	Kutztown*	Fisher Field; Easton, PA	W 32–16	4,239	
September 15	Bucknell	Fisher Field; Easton, PA	L 14–24		
September 22	at Yale*	Yale Bowl; New Haven, CT	L 17–18	6,458	
September 29	Penn*	Fisher Field; Easton, PA	W 20–13	8,214	
October 6	at Columbia*	Wien Stadium; New York, NY	W 41–34	4,075	
October 13	Cornell*	Fisher Field; Easton, PA	L 16–38	9,852	
October 20	at Army*	Michie Stadium; West Point, NY	L 0–56	38,947	
October 27	at No. 13 Holy Cross	Fitton Field; Worcester, MA	L 3–34	8,247	
November 3	at Fordham	Coffey Field; Bronx, NY	W 59–14	3,894	
November 10	at Colgate	Andy Kerr Stadium; Hamilton, NY	L 7–36	1,025	
November 17	Lehigh	Fisher Field; Easton, PA (The Rivalry)	L 14–35	17,651	
*Non-conference game; Rankings from NCAA Division I-AA Football Committee Poll released prior to the game
