= 1990 Princeton Tigers football team =

American college football season

1990 Princeton Tigers football
- Conference: Ivy League
- Record: 3–7 (2–5 Ivy)
- Head coach: Steve Tosches (4th season)
- Defensive coordinator: Mark Harriman (2nd season)
- Captain: Mike Hirou
- Home stadium: Palmer Stadium

1990 Ivy League football standings
| | Conf. | | | | | Overall |
| Team | W | | L | | T | W | | L | | T |
|---|---|---|---|---|---|---|---|---|---|---|
| No. 17 Dartmouth + | 6 | – | 1 | – | 0 | 7 | – | 2 | – | 1 |
| Cornell + | 6 | – | 1 | – | 0 | 7 | – | 3 | – | 0 |
| Yale | 5 | – | 2 | – | 0 | 6 | – | 4 | – | 0 |
| Harvard | 3 | – | 4 | – | 0 | 5 | – | 5 | – | 0 |
| Penn | 3 | – | 4 | – | 0 | 3 | – | 7 | – | 0 |
| Princeton | 2 | – | 5 | – | 0 | 3 | – | 7 | – | 0 |
| Brown | 2 | – | 5 | – | 0 | 2 | – | 8 | – | 0 |
| Columbia | 1 | – | 6 | – | 0 | 1 | – | 9 | – | 0 |
+ – Conference co-champions; Rankings from NCAA Division I-AA Football Committee poll

The 1990 Princeton Tigers football team was an American football team that represented Princeton University during the 1990 NCAA Division I-AA football season. Princeton tied for second-to-last in the Ivy League.

In their fourth year under head coach Steve Tosches, the Tigers compiled a 3–7 record and were outscored 224 to 168. Mike Hirou was the team captain.

Princeton's 2–5 conference record tied for sixth in the Ivy League standings. The Tigers were outscored 157 to 123 by Ivy opponents.

Princeton played its home games at Palmer Stadium on the university campus in Princeton, New Jersey.

== Schedule ==
| Date | Opponent | Site | Result | Attendance | Source |
|---|---|---|---|---|---|
| September 15 | at Cornell | Schoellkopf Field; Ithaca, NY | L 14–17 | 14,000 | |
| September 22 | Fordham* | Palmer Stadium; Princeton, NJ | W 23–14 | 4,127 | |
| September 29 | at Colgate* | Andy Kerr Stadium; Hamilton, NY | L 13–39 | 4,315 | |
| October 6 | Brown | Palmer Stadium; Princeton, NJ | W 27–23 | 14,528 | |
| October 13 | at Bucknell* | Christy Mathewson–Memorial Stadium; Lewisburg, PA | L 9–14 | 8,432 | |
| October 20 | Harvard | Palmer Stadium; Princeton, NJ (rivalry) | L 20–23 | 24,345 | |
| October 27 | at Columbia | Wien Stadium; New York, NY | L 15–17 | 10,750 | |
| November 3 | Penn | Palmer Stadium; Princeton, NJ (rivalry) | W 34–20 | 18,534 | |
| November 10 | at Yale | Yale Bowl; New Haven, CT (rivalry) | L 7–34 | 5,500 | |
| November 17 | No. 17 Dartmouth | Palmer Stadium; Princeton, NJ | L 6–23 | 9,842 | |
*Non-conference game; Rankings from NCAA Division I-AA Football Committee Poll released prior to the game
