= 1982 Yale Bulldogs football team =

American college football season

1982 Yale Bulldogs football
- Conference: Ivy League
- Record: 4–6 (3–4 Ivy)
- Head coach: Carmen Cozza (18th season)
- Home stadium: Yale Bowl

1982 Ivy League football standings
	Conf.					Overall
Team	W		L		T	W		L		T
Harvard +	5	–	2	–	0	7	–	3	–	0
Penn +	5	–	2	–	0	7	–	3	–	0
Dartmouth +	5	–	2	–	0	5	–	5	–	0
Princeton	3	–	4	–	0	3	–	7	–	0
Yale	3	–	4	–	0	4	–	6	–	0
Brown	3	–	4	–	0	5	–	5	–	0
Cornell	3	–	4	–	0	4	–	6	–	0
Columbia	1	–	6	–	0	1	–	9	–	0
+ – Conference co-champions

The 1982 Yale Bulldogs football team represented Yale University in the 1982 NCAA Division I-AA football season. The Bulldogs were led by 18th-year head coach Carmen Cozza, played their home games at the Yale Bowl and finished tied for fourth place in the Ivy League with a 3–4 record, 4–6 overall.

This was Yale's first year in Division I-AA, after having competed in the top-level Division I-A and its predecessors since helping to found the sport in 1872.

== Schedule ==
Date	Opponent	Site	Result	Attendance	Source
September 18	at Brown	Brown Stadium; Providence, RI	L 21–28	13,300	
September 25	Connecticut*	Yale Bowl; New Haven, CT	L 7–17	33,000	
October 2	Holy Cross*	Yale Bowl; New Haven, CT	L 6–10	19,200	
October 9	Boston University*	Yale Bowl; New Haven, CT	W 27–24	15,500	
October 16	Columbia	Yale Bowl; New Haven, CT	W 36–10	15,700	
October 23	at Penn	Franklin Field; Philadelphia, PA	L 14–27	32,175	
October 30	at Dartmouth	Memorial Field; Hanover, NH	W 22–21	15,300	
November 6	Cornell	Yale Bowl; New Haven, CT	L 20–26	18,000	
November 13	Princeton	Yale Bowl; New Haven, CT (rivalry)	W 37–19	28,250	
November 20	at Harvard	Harvard Stadium; Boston, MA (The Game)	L 7–45	40,000	
*Non-conference game

== Roster ==
1982 Yale Bulldogs football team roster
Players
Coaches
Offense

Pos.	#	Name	Class
G	51	Bill Basa	Sr
RB	34	Jim Dalzell	Sr
QB	17	Joe Dufek	Jr
WR	24	Kevin Guthrle	So
C	55	Jim Lang	Sr
TE	89	Charlie Parker	Jr
WR	14	Marc Quinlivan	So
TE	86	Scott Sheldon	Sr
RB	9	Paul Vogel	So

Defense

Pos.	#	Name	Class
DB	6	Brian Casey	Sr
DB	12	Bob Dooley	So
DB	22	Alan Gordon	Sr
DE	32	Kevin Kalinich	Jr
DE	92	Kaare Kolstad	So
LB	94	Scott Martin	So
LB	47	John Plazza	Sr
DB	21	Joe Pont	Jr

Special teams

Pos.	#	Name	Class
K	1	Jeff Arons	Sr

Head coach

- Carmen Cozza

Coordinators/assistant coaches

Legend

- (C) Team captain
- (S) Suspended
- (I) Ineligible
- Injured
- Redshirt
