= 1989 Columbia Lions football team =

American college football season

1989 Columbia Lions football
- Conference: Ivy League
- Record: 1–9 (1–6 Ivy)
- Head coach: Ray Tellier (1st season)
- Captain: Bart Barnett
- Home stadium: Wien Stadium

1989 Ivy League football standings
	Conf.					Overall
Team	W		L		T	W		L		T
Yale +	6	–	1	–	0	8	–	2	–	0
Princeton +	6	–	1	–	0	7	–	2	–	1
Harvard	5	–	2	–	0	5	–	5	–	0
Dartmouth	4	–	3	–	0	5	–	5	–	0
Cornell	2	–	5	–	0	4	–	6	–	0
Penn	2	–	5	–	0	4	–	6	–	0
Brown	2	–	5	–	0	2	–	8	–	0
Columbia	1	–	6	–	0	1	–	9	–	0
+ – Conference co-champions

The 1989 Columbia Lions football team was an American football team that represented Columbia University during the 1989 NCAA Division I-AA football season. Columbia finished last in the Ivy League. In their first season under head coach Ray Tellier, the Lions compiled a 1–9 record and were outscored 263 to 118. Bart Barnett was the team captain. The Lions' 1–6 conference record was the worst in the Ivy League standings. Columbia was outscored 170 to 104 by Ivy opponents. Columbia played its homes games at Lawrence A. Wien Stadium in Upper Manhattan, in New York City.

== Schedule ==
Date	Opponent	Site	Result	Attendance	Source
September 16	Harvard	Wien Stadium; New York, NY	L 10–26	4,750	
September 23	at Villanova*	Villanova Stadium; Villanova, PA	L 0–38	12,281	
September 30	at Lafayette*	Fisher Field; Easton, PA	L 14–52	4,350	
October 7	Penn	Wien Stadium; New York, NY	L 21–24	5,315	
October 14	at Princeton	Palmer Stadium; Princeton, NJ	L 8–24	11,140	
October 21	Yale^{†}	Wien Stadium; New York, NY	L 0–23	8,125	
October 28	Bucknell*	Wien Stadium; New York, NY	L 12–27	3,030	
November 4	Dartmouth	Wien Stadium; New York, NY	L 12–13	4,830	
November 11	at Cornell	Schoellkopf Field; Ithaca, NY (rivalry)	W 25–19	7,000	
November 18	at Brown	Brown Stadium; Providence, RI	L 28–41	6,300	
*Non-conference game; ^{†}Homecoming
