= 1989 Cornell Big Red football team =

American college football season

1989 Cornell Big Red football
- Conference: Ivy League
- Record: 4–6 (2–5 Ivy)
- Head coach: Jack Fouts (1st season)
- Captains: Drew Fraser; Mitch Lee
- Home stadium: Schoellkopf Field

1989 Ivy League football standings
	Conf.					Overall
Team	W		L		T	W		L		T
Yale +	6	–	1	–	0	8	–	2	–	0
Princeton +	6	–	1	–	0	7	–	2	–	1
Harvard	5	–	2	–	0	5	–	5	–	0
Dartmouth	4	–	3	–	0	5	–	5	–	0
Cornell	2	–	5	–	0	4	–	6	–	0
Penn	2	–	5	–	0	4	–	6	–	0
Brown	2	–	5	–	0	2	–	8	–	0
Columbia	1	–	6	–	0	1	–	9	–	0
+ – Conference co-champions

The 1989 Cornell Big Red football team was an American football team that represented Cornell University during the 1989 NCAA Division I-AA football season. Cornell tied for second-to-last in the Ivy League.

In its first and only season under head coach Jack Fouts, the team compiled a 4–6 record and was outscored 194 to 158. Drew Fraser and Mitch Lee were the team captains.

Cornell's 2–5 conference record earned a three-way tie for fifth in the Ivy League standings. The Big Red was outscored 142 to 114 by Ivy opponents.

Cornell played its home games at Schoellkopf Field in Ithaca, New York.

== Schedule ==
Date	Opponent	Site	Result	Attendance	Source
September 23	at Bucknell*	Memorial Stadium; Lewisburg, PA	W 20–9	2,433	
September 30	Northeastern*	Schoellkopf Field; Ithaca, NY	L 0–20	12,000	
October 7	Lafayette*	Schoellkopf Field; Ithaca, NY	W 24–23	8,000	
October 14	Harvard	Schoellkopf Field; Ithaca, NY	W 28–0	21,000	
October 21	at Brown	Brown Stadium; Providence, RI	L 7–28	8,000	
October 28	Dartmouth^{†}	Schoellkopf Field; Ithaca, NY	L 14–28	11,000	
November 4	at No. 20 Yale	Yale Bowl; New Haven, CT	L 19–34	15,638	
November 11	Columbia	Schoellkopf Field; Ithaca, NY (rivalry)	L 19–25	7,000	
November 18	at Princeton	Palmer Stadium; Princeton, NJ	L 7–21	12,505	
November 23	at Penn	Franklin Field; Philadelphia, PA (rivalry)	W 20–6	10,126	
*Non-conference game; ^{†}Homecoming; Rankings from the latest NCAA Division I-AA poll released prior to the game
