= 1989 Princeton Tigers football team =

American college football season

1989 Princeton Tigers football

Ivy League co-champion
- Conference: Ivy League
- Record: 7–2–1 (6–1 Ivy)
- Head coach: Steve Tosches (3rd season)
- Defensive coordinator: Mark Harriman (1st season)
- Captain: Franco S. Pagnanelli
- Home stadium: Palmer Stadium

1989 Ivy League football standings
	Conf.					Overall
Team	W		L		T	W		L		T
Yale +	6	–	1	–	0	8	–	2	–	0
Princeton +	6	–	1	–	0	7	–	2	–	1
Harvard	5	–	2	–	0	5	–	5	–	0
Dartmouth	4	–	3	–	0	5	–	5	–	0
Cornell	2	–	5	–	0	4	–	6	–	0
Penn	2	–	5	–	0	4	–	6	–	0
Brown	2	–	5	–	0	2	–	8	–	0
Columbia	1	–	6	–	0	1	–	9	–	0
+ – Conference co-champions

The 1989 Princeton Tigers football team was an American football team that represented Princeton University during the 1989 NCAA Division I-AA football season. Princeton tied for the Ivy League championship.

In their third year under head coach Steve Tosches, the Tigers compiled a 7–2–1 record and outscored opponents 237 to 177. Franco S. Pagnanelli was the team captain.

Princeton's 6–1 conference record tied for best in the Ivy League standings. The Tigers outscored Ivy opponents 168 to 80. The Tigers' only league loss was to their co-champion, Yale.

Princeton played its home games at Palmer Stadium on the university campus in Princeton, New Jersey.

== Schedule ==
Date	Opponent	Site	Result	Attendance	Source
September 16	at Dartmouth	Memorial Field; Hanover, NH	W 20–14	6,916	
September 23	No. 15 William & Mary*	Palmer Stadium; Princeton, NJ	T 31–31	4,138	
September 30	at No. 4 Holy Cross*	Fitton Field; Worcester, MA	L 0–46	16,442	
October 7	at Brown	Brown Stadium; Providence, RI	W 38–15	4,500	
October 14	Columbia	Palmer Stadium; Princeton, NJ	W 24–8	11,140	
October 21	Fordham*	Palmer Stadium; Princeton, NJ	W 38–20	12,505	
October 28	at Harvard	Harvard Stadium; Boston, MA (rivalry)	W 28–14	22,300	
November 4	at Penn	Franklin Field; Philadelphia, PA (rivalry)	W 30–8	38,106	
November 11	No. 15 Yale	Palmer Stadium; Princeton, NJ (rivalry)	L 7–14	37,762	
November 18	Cornell	Palmer Stadium; Princeton, NJ	W 21–7	12,505	
*Non-conference game; Rankings from the latest NCAA Division I-AA poll released prior to the game
