= 1989 Harvard Crimson football team =

American college football season

1989 Harvard Crimson football
- Conference: Ivy League
- Record: 5–5 (5–2 Ivy)
- Head coach: Joe Restic (19th season)
- Captain: Greg Gicewicz
- Home stadium: Harvard Stadium

1989 Ivy League football standings
	Conf.					Overall
Team	W		L		T	W		L		T
Yale +	6	–	1	–	0	8	–	2	–	0
Princeton +	6	–	1	–	0	7	–	2	–	1
Harvard	5	–	2	–	0	5	–	5	–	0
Dartmouth	4	–	3	–	0	5	–	5	–	0
Cornell	2	–	5	–	0	4	–	6	–	0
Penn	2	–	5	–	0	4	–	6	–	0
Brown	2	–	5	–	0	2	–	8	–	0
Columbia	1	–	6	–	0	1	–	9	–	0
+ – Conference co-champions

The 1989 Harvard Crimson football team was an American football team that represented Harvard University during the 1989 NCAA Division I-AA football season. Harvard finished third in the Ivy League.

In their 19th year under head coach Joe Restic, the Crimson compiled a 5–5 record and were outscored 257 to 207. Greg Gicewicz was the team captain.

Harvard's 5–2 conference record placed third in the Ivy League standings. The Crimson outscored Ivy opponents 134 to 120.

Harvard played its home games at Harvard Stadium in the Allston neighborhood of Boston, Massachusetts.

== Schedule ==
Date	Opponent	Site	Result	Attendance	Source
September 16	at Columbia	Wien Stadium; New York, NY	W 26–10	4,750	
September 23	No. 4 Holy Cross*	Harvard Stadium; Boston, MA	L 17–31	17,500	
September 30	at Army*	Michie Stadium; West Point, NY	L 28–56	39,115	
October 7	Lehigh*	Harvard Stadium; Boston, MA	L 28–50	11,200	
October 14	at Cornell	Schoellkopf Field; Ithaca, NY	L 0–28	21,000	
October 21	Dartmouth	Harvard Stadium; Boston, MA (rivalry)	W 6–5	20,500	
October 28	Princeton	Harvard Stadium; Boston, MA (rivalry)	L 14–28	22,300	
November 4	at Brown	Brown Stadium; Providence, RI	W 27–14	10,700	
November 11	Penn	Harvard Stadium; Boston, MA (rivalry)	W 24–15	12,600	
November 18	at No. 13 Yale	Yale Bowl; New Haven, CT (The Game)	W 37–20	59,263	
*Non-conference game; Rankings from NCAA Division I-AA Football Committee Poll released prior to the game
