= Mickey Kwiatkowski =

American football player and coach (born 1947)

Biographical details
- Born: August 31, 1947 (age 79)

Playing career
- 1968–1969: Delaware
- Position: Guard

Coaching career (HC unless noted)
- 1972: Boston College (assistant)
- 1973–1974: Salisbury State (OL)
- 1975–1976: West Chester State (GA)
- 1977–1980: Southwest Missouri State (assistant)
- 1981–1989: Hofstra
- 1990–1993: Brown

Head coaching record
- Overall: 75–60
- Tournaments: 0–5 (NCAA D-III playoffs)

Mickey Kwiatkowski (born August 31, 1947) is an American football coach and a proponent of the Spread-T flex offense. Kwiatkowski served as offensive coordinator at Southwest Missouri State University before becoming head coach at Hofstra University, then a member of the NCAA's Division III. In 1990, he was hired by Brown University but was fired after a four-year record of 7–33.

== Head coaching record ==
Year	Team	Overall	Conference	Standing	Bowl/playoffs
Hofstra Flying Dutchmen (NCAA Division III independent) (1981–1989)
1981	Hofstra	4–6			
1982	Hofstra	6–4			
1983	Hofstra	10–1			L NCAA Division III Quarterfinal
1984	Hofstra	9–1			
1985	Hofstra	4–6			
1986	Hofstra	9–2			L NCAA Division III First Round
1987	Hofstra	9–2			L NCAA Division III First Round
1988	Hofstra	9–2			L NCAA Division III First Round
1989	Hofstra	8–3			L NCAA Division III First Round
Hofstra:		68–27			
Brown Bears (Ivy League) (1990–1993)
1990	Brown	2–8	2–5	T–6th	
1991	Brown	1–9	1–6	T–7th	
1992	Brown	0–10	0–7	8th	
1993	Brown	4–6	3–4	T–4th	
Brown:		7–33	6–22		
Total:		75–60			
