= Jack Fouts =

American football player and coach (1925–2012)

Biographical details
- Born: September 8, 1925; Akron, Ohio, U.S.
- Died: March 1, 2012 (aged 86)

Playing career
- 1946–1947: Ohio Wesleyan

Coaching career (HC unless noted)
- 1959–1963: Michigan (assistant)
- 1964–1983: Ohio Wesleyan
- 1984–1988: Cornell (assistant)
- 1989: Cornell

Head coaching record
- Overall: 80–100–9

Accomplishments and honors

Championships
- 2 OAC (1967, 1971)

Awards
- OAC Coach of the Year (1971)

Jack D. Fouts (September 8, 1925 – March 1, 2012) was an American college football player and coach. He served as the head football coach at Ohio Wesleyan University from 1964 to 1983 and at Cornell University in 1989, compiling a career head coaching record of 80–100–9 Fouts died on March 1, 2012.

== Head coaching record ==
Year	Team	Overall	Conference	Standing	Bowl/playoffs
Ohio Wesleyan Battling Bishops (Ohio Athletic Conference) (1964–1983)
1964	Ohio Wesleyan	2–7	1–5	14th	
1965	Ohio Wesleyan	3–5–1	1–3–1	11th	
1966	Ohio Wesleyan	6–3	4–2	T–4th	
1967	Ohio Wesleyan	8–0–1	6–0	1st	
1968	Ohio Wesleyan	8–1	6–1	T–2nd	
1969	Ohio Wesleyan	5–4	4–3	7th	
1970	Ohio Wesleyan	2–7	1–5	13th	
1971	Ohio Wesleyan	8–1	6–0	1st	L Amos Alonzo Stagg
1972	Ohio Wesleyan	3–5–1	1–2–1	3rd (Blue)	
1973	Ohio Wesleyan	3–5–1	2–1–1	T–2nd (Blue)	
1974	Ohio Wesleyan	4–5	1–3	4th (Blue)	
1975	Ohio Wesleyan	4–5	1–3	4th (Blue)	
1976	Ohio Wesleyan	3–5	2–3	4th (Blue)	
1977	Ohio Wesleyan	2–6–1	0–4–1	T–5th (Blue)	
1978	Ohio Wesleyan	3–5–1	2–3	T–4th (Red)	
1979	Ohio Wesleyan	1–8	1–4	5th (Red)	
1980	Ohio Wesleyan	2–6–1	1–5	6th (Blue)	
1981	Ohio Wesleyan	4–5	2–4	5th (Blue)	
1982	Ohio Wesleyan	4–5	2–3	4th (Blue)	
1983	Ohio Wesleyan	1–6–2	1–3–1	5th (Red)	
Ohio Wesleyan:		76–94–9	45–57–5		
Cornell Big Red (Ivy League) (1989)
1989	Cornell	4–6	2–5	T–5th	
Cornell:		4–6	2–5		
Total:		80–100–9			
National championship Conference title Conference division title or championship game berth
