= 1990 Lehigh Engineers football team =

American college football season

1990 Lehigh Engineers football
- Conference: Patriot League
- Record: 7–4 (3–2 Patriot)
- Head coach: Hank Small (5th season)
- Captains: Craig Domalewski; Jarrod Johnson
- Home stadium: Goodman Stadium

1990 Patriot League football standings
	Conf.					Overall
Team	W		L		T	W		L		T
No. 8 Holy Cross $	5	–	0	–	0	9	–	1	–	1
Bucknell	3	–	2	–	0	7	–	4	–	0
Colgate	3	–	2	–	0	7	–	4	–	0
Lehigh	3	–	2	–	0	7	–	4	–	0
Lafayette	1	–	4	–	0	4	–	7	–	0
Fordham	0	–	5	–	0	1	–	9	–	0
$ – Conference champion; Rankings from NCAA Division I-AA Football Committee poll

The 1990 Lehigh Engineers football team was an American football team that represented Lehigh University during the 1990 NCAA Division I-AA football season. Lehigh tied for second place in the newly renamed Patriot League.

In their fifth year under head coach Hank Small, the Engineers compiled a 7–4 record. Craig Domalewski and Jarrod Johnson were the team captains.

The Engineers outscored opponents 329 to 211. Their 3–2 conference record placed Lehigh in a three-way tie for second place in the six-team Patriot League standings. This was the first year of competition under the Patriot League banner; the league had been known as the Colonial League since 1986.

Following two early-season wins, Lehigh briefly entered the national Division I-AA rankings, appearing at No. 20 in the poll released September 18. A loss dropped them out of the top 20 the next week. Lehigh finished the season unranked.

Lehigh played its home games at Goodman Stadium on the university's Goodman Campus in Bethlehem, Pennsylvania.

== Schedule ==
Date	Opponent	Site	Result	Attendance	Source
September 8	Fordham	Goodman Stadium; Bethlehem, PA	W 35–3	10,153	
September 15	at Towson State*	Minnegan Stadium; Towson, MD	W 35–14		
September 22	at Dartmouth*	Memorial Field; Hanover, NH	L 14–33	4,229	
September 29	Columbia*	Goodman Stadium; Bethlehem, PA	W 42–9	8,300	
October 6	at Penn*	Franklin Field; Philadelphia, PA	W 22–16	17,622	
October 13	at Northeastern*	Parsons Field; Brookline, MA	W 28–13	2,025	
October 20	at No. 15 Holy Cross	Fitton Field; Worcester, MA	L 22–34	17,848	
October 27	at No. 11 William & Mary*	Cary Field; Williamsburg, VA	L 17–38	8,925	
November 3	No. 19 Colgate	Goodman Stadium; Bethlehem, PA	W 52–7	11,187	
November 10	Bucknell	Goodman Stadium; Bethlehem, PA	L 27–30	2,857	
November 17	at Lafayette	Fisher Field; Easton, PA (The Rivalry)	W 35–14	17,651	
*Non-conference game; Rankings from NCAA Division I-AA Football Committee Poll released prior to the game
