= 1990 Bucknell Bison football team =

American college football season

1990 Bucknell Bison football
- Conference: Patriot League
- Record: 7–4 (3–2 Patriot)
- Head coach: Lou Maranzana (2nd season)
- Captains: Mike Augsberger; Craig Cavlovic
- Home stadium: Christy Mathewson–Memorial Stadium

1990 Patriot League football standings
| | Conf. | | | | | Overall |
| Team | W | | L | | T | W | | L | | T |
|---|---|---|---|---|---|---|---|---|---|---|
| No. 8 Holy Cross $ | 5 | – | 0 | – | 0 | 9 | – | 1 | – | 1 |
| Bucknell | 3 | – | 2 | – | 0 | 7 | – | 4 | – | 0 |
| Colgate | 3 | – | 2 | – | 0 | 7 | – | 4 | – | 0 |
| Lehigh | 3 | – | 2 | – | 0 | 7 | – | 4 | – | 0 |
| Lafayette | 1 | – | 4 | – | 0 | 4 | – | 7 | – | 0 |
| Fordham | 0 | – | 5 | – | 0 | 1 | – | 9 | – | 0 |
$ – Conference champion; Rankings from NCAA Division I-AA Football Committee poll

The 1990 Bucknell Bison football team was an American football team that represented Bucknell University during the 1990 NCAA Division I-AA football season. Bucknell tied for second in the newly renamed Patriot League.

During its second year under head coach Lou Maranzana, the Bison compiled a 7–4 record. Mike Augsberger and Craig Cavlovic were the team captains.

The Bison outscored opponents 337 to 278. Its 3–2 conference record placed the team in a three-way tie for second place in the six-team Patriot League standings.

This was the first year of competition under the Patriot League banner; the league had been known as the Colonial League since 1986.

After a five-game win streak, the Bison briefly entered the national Division I-AA rankings, appearing at No. 20 in the poll released October 16. A loss dropped the team out of the top twenty the next week. Bucknell ultimately finished the season unranked.

Bucknell played its home games at Christy Mathewson–Memorial Stadium on the university campus in Lewisburg, Pennsylvania.

== Schedule ==
| Date | Opponent | Rank | Site | Result | Attendance | Source |
|---|---|---|---|---|---|---|
| September 8 | Hofstra* | | Christy Mathewson–Memorial Stadium; Lewisburg, PA | L 29–42 | | |
| September 15 | at Lafayette | | Fisher Field; Easton, PA | W 24–14 | | |
| September 22 | Columbia* | | Christy Mathewson–Memorial Stadium; Lewisburg, PA | W 41–16 | 3,418 | |
| September 29 | at Cornell* | | Schoellkopf Field; Ithaca, NY | W 42–21 | 7,500 | |
| October 6 | Towson State* | | Christy Mathewson–Memorial Stadium; Lewisburg, PA | W 55–26 | 4,041 | |
| October 13 | Princeton^* | | Christy Mathewson–Memorial Stadium; Lewisburg, PA | W 14–9 | 8,432 | |
| October 20 | at No. 14 William & Mary* | No. 20 | Cary Field; Williamsburg, VA | L 17–45 | 9,821 | |
| October 27 | Colgate^{†} | | Christy Mathewson–Memorial Stadium; Lewisburg, PA | L 27–28 | 8,435 | |
| November 3 | at No. 11 Holy Cross | | Fitton Field; Worcester, MA | L 14–43 | 11,995 | |
| November 10 | at Lehigh | | Goodman Stadium; Bethlehem, PA | W 30–27 | 2,857 | |
| November 17 | Fordham | | Christy Mathewson–Memorial Stadium; Lewisburg, PA | W 44–7 | | |
*Non-conference game; ^{†}Homecoming; ^ Parents Weekend; Rankings from NCAA Division I-AA Football Committee Poll released prior to the game
