= Gary Steele (American football) =

American football coach

Coaching career (HC unless noted)
- 1983–1985: Penn (assistant)
- 1986–1988: Penn (DC)
- 1989–1991: Penn

Head coaching record
- Overall: 9–21

Accomplishments and honors

Awards
- Second-team All-American (1967)

Gary Steele is an American former college football coach. Steele served as the head football coach at the University of Pennsylvania from 1989 to 1991, compiling a record of 9–21.

== Head coaching record ==
Year	Team	Overall	Conference	Standing	Bowl/playoffs
Penn Quakers (Ivy League) (1989–1991)
1989	Penn	4–6	2–5	T–5th	
1990	Penn	3–7	3–4	T–4th	
1991	Penn	2–8	2–5	6th	
Penn:		9–21	7–14		
Total:		9–21			
