= 1982 Columbia Lions football team =

American college football season

1982 Columbia Lions football
- Conference: Ivy League
- Record: 1–9 (1–6 Ivy)
- Head coach: Bob Naso (3rd season)
- Captains: Jim Davin; Mike Scavina
- Home stadium: Baker Field

1982 Ivy League football standings
	Conf.					Overall
Team	W		L		T	W		L		T
Harvard +	5	–	2	–	0	7	–	3	–	0
Penn +	5	–	2	–	0	7	–	3	–	0
Dartmouth +	5	–	2	–	0	5	–	5	–	0
Princeton	3	–	4	–	0	3	–	7	–	0
Yale	3	–	4	–	0	4	–	6	–	0
Brown	3	–	4	–	0	5	–	5	–	0
Cornell	3	–	4	–	0	4	–	6	–	0
Columbia	1	–	6	–	0	1	–	9	–	0
+ – Conference co-champions

The 1982 Columbia Lions football team was an American football team that represented Columbia University during the 1982 NCAA Division I-AA football season. Columbia finished last in the Ivy League.

In their third season under head coach Bob Naso, the Lions compiled a 1–9 record and were outscored 390 to 236. Jim Davin and Mike Scavina were the team captains.

The Lions' 1–6 conference record was the worst in the Ivy League standings. Columbia was outscored 254 to 180 by Ivy opponents.

This was Columbia's first year in Division I-AA, after having competed in the top-level Division I-A and its predecessors since 1870.

Columbia played its home games at Baker Field in Upper Manhattan, in New York City. This was the final year for Baker Field, which had hosted Columbia football since 1923. Following Baker Field's demolition, Columbia built Lawrence A. Wien Stadium, its current football home, on the same site.

== Schedule ==
Date	Opponent	Site	Result	Attendance	Source
September 18	at Harvard	Harvard Stadium; Boston, MA	L 16–27	8,500	
September 25	Lafayette*	Baker Field; New York, NY	L 23–53	3,525	
October 2	at Penn	Franklin Field; Philadelphia, PA	L 31–51	13,563	
October 9	Princeton^{†}	Baker Field; New York, NY	W 35–14	8,150	
October 16	at Yale	Yale Bowl; New Haven, CT	L 10–36	15,700	
October 23	Bucknell*	Baker Field; New York, NY	L 25–42	3,250	
October 30	at Army*	Michie Stadium; West Point, NY	L 8–41	30,663	
November 6	at Dartmouth	Memorial Field; Hanover, NH	L 41–56	5,100	
November 13	Cornell	Baker Field; New York, NY (rivalry)	L 26–35	4,150	
November 20	Brown	Baker Field; New York, NY	L 21–35	5,775	
*Non-conference game; ^{†}Homecoming
