= 1982 Brown Bears football team =

American college football season

1982 Brown Bears football
- Conference: Ivy League
- Record: 5–5 (3–4 Ivy)
- Head coach: John Anderson (10th season)
- Offensive coordinator: Joe Wirth (1st season)
- Defensive coordinator: Ray Tellier (1st season)
- Captains: B. Barrett; D. Nelson; K. Powers
- Home stadium: Brown Stadium

1982 Ivy League football standings
	Conf.					Overall
Team	W		L		T	W		L		T
Harvard +	5	–	2	–	0	7	–	3	–	0
Penn +	5	–	2	–	0	7	–	3	–	0
Dartmouth +	5	–	2	–	0	5	–	5	–	0
Princeton	3	–	4	–	0	3	–	7	–	0
Yale	3	–	4	–	0	4	–	6	–	0
Brown	3	–	4	–	0	5	–	5	–	0
Cornell	3	–	4	–	0	4	–	6	–	0
Columbia	1	–	6	–	0	1	–	9	–	0
+ – Conference co-champions

The 1982 Brown Bears football team was an American football team that represented Brown University during the 1982 NCAA Division I-AA football season. Brown tied for fourth place in the Ivy League.

In their sixth season under head coach John Anderson, the Bears compiled a 5–5 record but were outscored 214 to 228. B. Barrett, D. Nelson and K. Powers were the team captains.

The Bears' 3–4 conference record earned them part of a four-way tie for fourth place in the Ivy League standings. They were outscored 169 to 161 by Ivy opponents.

This was Brown's first year in Division I-AA, after having competed in the top-level Division I-A and its predecessors since 1878.

Brown played its home games at Brown Stadium in Providence, Rhode Island.

== Schedule ==
Date	Opponent	Site	Result	Attendance	Source
September 18	Yale	Brown Stadium; Providence, RI	W 28–21	13,300	
September 25	Rhode Island*	Brown Stadium; Providence, RI (rivalry)	W 24–20	14,008	
October 2	at Princeton	Palmer Stadium; Princeton, NJ	L 23–28	10,743	
October 9	No. 16 Penn	Brown Stadium; Providence, RI	L 21–24	6,500	
October 16	at Cornell	Schoellkopf Field; Ithaca, NY	W 38–19	10,250	
October 23	No. 9 Holy Cross*	Brown Stadium; Providence, RI	L 6–17	15,100	
October 30	at Harvard	Harvard Stadium; Boston, MA	L 0–34	18,000	
November 6	at William & Mary*	Cary Field; Williamsburg, VA	W 23–22	16,000	
November 13	Dartmouth	Brown Stadium; Providence, RI	L 16–22	5,600	
November 20	at Columbia	Baker Field; New York, NY	W 35–21	5,775	
*Non-conference game; Rankings from the latest NCAA Division I-AA poll released prior to the game
