= 1989 Penn Quakers football team =

American college football season

1989 Penn Quakers football
- Conference: Ivy League
- Record: 4–6 (2–5 Ivy)
- Head coach: Gary Steele (1st season)
- Offensive coordinator: Dick Maloney (4th season)
- Captains: Bryan Keys; Steve Johnson
- Home stadium: Franklin Field

1989 Ivy League football standings
	Conf.					Overall
Team	W		L		T	W		L		T
Yale +	6	–	1	–	0	8	–	2	–	0
Princeton +	6	–	1	–	0	7	–	2	–	1
Harvard	5	–	2	–	0	5	–	5	–	0
Dartmouth	4	–	3	–	0	5	–	5	–	0
Cornell	2	–	5	–	0	4	–	6	–	0
Penn	2	–	5	–	0	4	–	6	–	0
Brown	2	–	5	–	0	2	–	8	–	0
Columbia	1	–	6	–	0	1	–	9	–	0
+ – Conference co-champions

The 1989 Penn Quakers football team was an American football team that represented the University of Pennsylvania during the 1989 NCAA Division I-AA football season. It tied for second-to-last in the Ivy League.

Penn played its home games at Franklin Field on the university's campus in Philadelphia, Pennsylvania.

== History ==
In its first year under head coach Gary Steele, the team compiled a 4–6 record and was outscored 229 to 171. Bryan Keys and Steve Johnson were the team captains.

Penn's 2–5 conference record earned a three-way tie for fifth in the Ivy League standings. The Quakers were outscored 172 to 107 by Ivy opponents.

== Schedule ==
Date	Opponent	Site	Result	Attendance	Source
September 16	at Colgate*	Andy Kerr Stadium; Hamilton, NY	L 14–21	3,000	
September 23	Lafayette*	Franklin Field; Philadelphia, PA	W 25–12	11,513	
October 7	at Columbia	Wien Stadium; New York, NY	W 24–21	5,315	
October 14	Brown	Franklin Field; Philadelphia, PA	W 32–30	10,879	
October 21	Bucknell*	Franklin Field; Philadelphia, PA	W 25–24	21,807	
October 28	at Yale	Yale Bowl; New Haven, CT	L 22–23	18,745	
November 4	Princeton	Franklin Field; Philadelphia, PA (rivalry)	L 8–30	38,106	
November 11	at Harvard	Harvard Stadium; Boston, MA (rivalry)	L 15–24	12,600	
November 18	Dartmouth	Franklin Field; Philadelphia, PA	L 0–24	8,207	
November 23	Cornell	Franklin Field; Philadelphia, PA (rivalry)	L 6–20	10,126	
*Non-conference game
