= 1989 Yale Bulldogs football team =

American college football season

1989 Yale Bulldogs football

Ivy League co-champion
- Conference: Ivy League
- Record: 8–2 (6–1 Ivy)
- Head coach: Carmen Cozza (25th season)
- Defensive coordinator: Don Brown (1st season)
- Home stadium: Yale Bowl

1989 Ivy League football standings
	Conf.					Overall
Team	W		L		T	W		L		T
Yale +	6	–	1	–	0	8	–	2	–	0
Princeton +	6	–	1	–	0	7	–	2	–	1
Harvard	5	–	2	–	0	5	–	5	–	0
Dartmouth	4	–	3	–	0	5	–	5	–	0
Cornell	2	–	5	–	0	4	–	6	–	0
Penn	2	–	5	–	0	4	–	6	–	0
Brown	2	–	5	–	0	2	–	8	–	0
Columbia	1	–	6	–	0	1	–	9	–	0
+ – Conference co-champions

The 1989 Yale Bulldogs football team represented Yale University in the 1989 NCAA Division I-AA football season. The Bulldogs were led by 25th-year head coach Carmen Cozza, played their home games at the Yale Bowl and finished tied for first place in the Ivy League with a 6–1 record, 8–2 overall.

== Schedule ==
Date	Opponent	Site	Result	Attendance	Source
September 16	Brown	Yale Bowl; New Haven, CT	W 12–3	11,252	
September 23	Lehigh*	Yale Bowl; New Haven, CT	W 33–17	9,907	
September 30	Connecticut*	Yale Bowl; New Haven, CT	L 20–31	21,319	
October 7	Colgate*	Yale Bowl; New Haven, CT	W 36–15	20,540	
October 14	at Dartmouth	Memorial Field; Hanover, NH	W 24–19	15,431	
October 21	at Columbia	Wien Stadium; New York, NY	W 23–0	8,125	
October 28	Penn	Yale Bowl; New Haven, CT	W 23–22	18,745	
November 4	Cornell	Yale Bowl; New Haven, CT	W 34–19	15,638	
November 11	at Princeton	Palmer Stadium; Princeton, NJ (rivalry)	W 14–7	37,762	
November 18	Harvard	Yale Bowl; New Haven, CT (The Game)	L 20–37	59,263	
*Non-conference game
