= 1990 Brown Bears football team =

American college football season

1990 Brown Bears football
- Conference: Ivy League
- Record: 2–8 (2–5 Ivy)
- Head coach: Mickey Kwiatkowski (1st season)
- Defensive coordinator: Jim Bernhardt (1st season)
- Captains: Nick Badalato; Greg Patrick; Reid Smith
- Home stadium: Brown Stadium

1990 Ivy League football standings
	Conf.					Overall
Team	W		L		T	W		L		T
No. 17 Dartmouth +	6	–	1	–	0	7	–	2	–	1
Cornell +	6	–	1	–	0	7	–	3	–	0
Yale	5	–	2	–	0	6	–	4	–	0
Harvard	3	–	4	–	0	5	–	5	–	0
Penn	3	–	4	–	0	3	–	7	–	0
Princeton	2	–	5	–	0	3	–	7	–	0
Brown	2	–	5	–	0	2	–	8	–	0
Columbia	1	–	6	–	0	1	–	9	–	0
+ – Conference co-champions; Rankings from NCAA Division I-AA Football Committee poll

The 1990 Brown Bears football team was an American football team that represented Brown University during the 1990 NCAA Division I-AA football season. Brown tied for second-to-last in the Ivy League.

In their first season under head coach Mickey Kwiatkowski, the Bears compiled a 2–8 record and were outscored 289 to 160. Nick Badalato, Greg Patrick and Reid Smith were the team captains.

The Bears' 2–5 conference record tied for sixth in the Ivy League standings. They were outscored 186 to 129 by Ivy opponents.

Brown played its home games at Brown Stadium in Providence, Rhode Island.

== Schedule ==
Date	Opponent	Site	Result	Attendance	Source
September 15	Yale	Brown Stadium; Providence, RI	L 21–27	10,575	
September 22	at No. 12 Rhode Island*	Meade Stadium; Kingston, RI	L 3–23	7,413	
September 29	Fordham*	Brown Stadium; Providence, RI	L 28–35	4,068	
October 6	at Princeton	Palmer Stadium; Princeton, NJ	L 23–27	14,528	
October 13	No. 20 Holy Cross*	Brown Stadium; Providence, RI	L 0–55	4,700	
October 20	Penn	Brown Stadium; Providence, RI	W 24–17	12,600	
October 27	at Cornell	Schoellkopf Field; Ithaca, NY	L 7–24	16,000	
November 3	at Harvard	Harvard Stadium; Boston, MA	L 37–52	15,500	
November 10	No. 20 Dartmouth	Brown Stadium; Providence, RI	L 0–29	2,100	
November 17	at Columbia	Wien Stadium; New York, NY	W 17–0	3,130	
*Non-conference game; Rankings from NCAA Division I-AA Football Committee Poll released prior to the game
