= 1990 Penn Quakers football team =

American college football season

1990 Penn Quakers football
- Conference: Ivy League
- Record: 3–7 (3–4 Ivy)
- Head coach: Gary Steele (2nd season)
- Offensive coordinator: Dick Maloney (5th season)
- Captains: Brian Griffin; Joe Valerio
- Home stadium: Franklin Field

1990 Ivy League football standings
	Conf.					Overall
Team	W		L		T	W		L		T
No. 17 Dartmouth +	6	–	1	–	0	7	–	2	–	1
Cornell +	6	–	1	–	0	7	–	3	–	0
Yale	5	–	2	–	0	6	–	4	–	0
Harvard	3	–	4	–	0	5	–	5	–	0
Penn	3	–	4	–	0	3	–	7	–	0
Princeton	2	–	5	–	0	3	–	7	–	0
Brown	2	–	5	–	0	2	–	8	–	0
Columbia	1	–	6	–	0	1	–	9	–	0
+ – Conference co-champions; Rankings from NCAA Division I-AA Football Committee poll

The 1990 Penn Quakers football team was an American football team that represented the University of Pennsylvania during the 1990 NCAA Division I-AA football season. It tied for fourth in the Ivy League.

Penn played its home games at Franklin Field adjacent to the university's campus in Philadelphia, Pennsylvania.

== History ==
In its second year under head coach Gary Steele, the team compiled a 3–7 record and was outscored 197 to 155. Joe Valerio and Brian Griffin were the team captains.

Penn's 3–4 conference record tied for fourth place in the Ivy League standings. The Quakers were outscored 138 to 123 by Ivy opponents.

== Schedule ==
Date	Opponent	Site	Result	Attendance	Source
September 15	at Dartmouth	Memorial Field; Hanover, NH	W 16–6	8,119	
September 22	Holy Cross*	Franklin Field; Philadelphia, PA	L 3–17	12,189	
September 29	at Lafayette*	Fisher Field; Easton, PA	L 13–20	8,214	
October 6	Lehigh*	Franklin Field; Philadelphia, PA	L 16–22	17,622	
October 13	Columbia	Franklin Field; Philadelphia, PA	W 21–6	10,121	
October 20	at Brown	Brown Stadium; Providence, RI	L 17–24	12,600	
October 27	Yale	Franklin Field; Philadelphia, PA	L 10–27	32,389	
November 3	at Princeton	Palmer Stadium; Princeton, NJ (rivalry)	L 20–34	18,534	
November 10	Harvard	Franklin Field; Philadelphia, PA (rivalry)	W 24–20	17,918	
November 17	at Cornell	Schoellkopf Field; Ithaca, NY (rivalry)	L 15–21	12,000	
*Non-conference game
