= 1990 Columbia Lions football team =

American college football season

1990 Columbia Lions football
- Conference: Ivy League
- Record: 1–9 (1–6 Ivy)
- Head coach: Ray Tellier (2nd season)
- Captains: Bruce Mayhew; Galen Snyder
- Home stadium: Wien Stadium

1990 Ivy League football standings
	Conf.					Overall
Team	W		L		T	W		L		T
No. 17 Dartmouth +	6	–	1	–	0	7	–	2	–	1
Cornell +	6	–	1	–	0	7	–	3	–	0
Yale	5	–	2	–	0	6	–	4	–	0
Harvard	3	–	4	–	0	5	–	5	–	0
Penn	3	–	4	–	0	3	–	7	–	0
Princeton	2	–	5	–	0	3	–	7	–	0
Brown	2	–	5	–	0	2	–	8	–	0
Columbia	1	–	6	–	0	1	–	9	–	0
+ – Conference co-champions; Rankings from NCAA Division I-AA Football Committee poll

The 1990 Columbia Lions football team was an American football team that represented Columbia University during the 1990 NCAA Division I-AA football season. Columbia finished last in the Ivy League.

In their second season under head coach Ray Tellier, the Lions compiled a 1–9 record and were outscored 292 to 115. Bruce Mayhew and Galen Snyder were the team captains.

The Lions' 1–6 conference record placed eighth in the Ivy League standings. Columbia was outscored 168 to 56 by Ivy opponents.

Columbia played its homes games at Lawrence A. Wien Stadium in Upper Manhattan, in New York City.

== Schedule ==
Date	Opponent	Site	Result	Attendance	Source
September 15	Harvard	Wien Stadium; New York, NY	L 6–9	9,430	
September 22	at Bucknell*	Christy Mathewson–Memorial Stadium; Lewisburg, PA	L 16–41	3,418	
September 29	at Lehigh*	Goodman Stadium; Bethlehem, PA	L 9–42	8,300	
October 6	Lafayette*	Wien Stadium; New York, NY	L 34–41	4,075	
October 13	at Penn	Franklin Field; Philadelphia, PA	L 6–21	10,121	
October 20	at Yale	Yale Bowl; New Haven, CT	L 7–31	11,132	
October 27	Princeton^{†}	Wien Stadium; New York, NY	W 17–15	10,750	
November 3	at Dartmouth	Memorial Field; Hanover, NH	L 20–34	5,113	
November 10	Cornell	Wien Stadium; New York, NY (rivalry)	L 0–41	860	
November 17	Brown	Wien Stadium; New York, NY	L 0–17	3,130	
*Non-conference game; ^{†}Homecoming
