= 1982 Cornell Big Red football team =

American college football season

1982 Cornell Big Red football
- Conference: Ivy League
- Record: 4–6 (3–4 Ivy)
- Head coach: Bob Blackman (6th season)
- Captains: Steve Duca; Dan Suren
- Home stadium: Schoellkopf Field

1982 Ivy League football standings
	Conf.					Overall
Team	W		L		T	W		L		T
Harvard +	5	–	2	–	0	7	–	3	–	0
Penn +	5	–	2	–	0	7	–	3	–	0
Dartmouth +	5	–	2	–	0	5	–	5	–	0
Princeton	3	–	4	–	0	3	–	7	–	0
Yale	3	–	4	–	0	4	–	6	–	0
Brown	3	–	4	–	0	5	–	5	–	0
Cornell	3	–	4	–	0	4	–	6	–	0
Columbia	1	–	6	–	0	1	–	9	–	0
+ – Conference co-champions

The 1982 Cornell Big Red football team was an American football team that represented Cornell University during the 1982 NCAA Division I-AA football season. Cornell tied for fourth place in the Ivy League.

In its sixth and final season under head coach Bob Blackman, the team compiled a 4–6 record but outscored opponents 211 to 202. Team captains were Steve Duca and Dan Suren.

Cornell's 3–4 conference record earned it part of a four-way tie for fourth place in the Ivy League standings. The Big Red outscored Ivy opponents 165 to 164.

This was Cornell's first year in Division I-AA, after having competed in the top-level Division I-A and its predecessors since 1887.

Cornell played its home games at Schoellkopf Field in Ithaca, New York.

== Schedule ==
Date	Opponent	Site	Result	Attendance	Source
September 18	Princeton	Schoellkopf Field; Ithaca, NY	L 36–41	11,118	
September 25	No. 9 Colgate*	Schoellkopf Field; Ithaca, NY (rivalry)	L 6–21	13,013	
October 2	Boston University*	Schoellkopf Field; Ithaca, NY	L 6–17	10,000	
October 9	at Harvard	Harvard Stadium; Boston, MA	L 13–25	8,000	
October 16	Brown	Schoellkopf Field; Ithaca, NY	L 19–38	10,250	
October 23	Dartmouth	Schoellkopf Field; Ithaca, NY (rivalry)	L 13–14	5,700	
October 30	Merchant Marine*	Schoellkopf Field; Ithaca, NY	W 34–0	3,300	
November 6	at Yale	Yale Bowl; New Haven, CT	W 26–20	18,000	
November 13	at Columbia	Baker Field; New York, NY (rivalry)	W 35–26	4,150	
November 20	No. 17 Penn	Schoellkopf Field; Ithaca, NY (rivalry)	W 23–0	9,500	
*Non-conference game; Rankings from the latest NCAA Division I-AA poll released prior to the game
