= 1990 Dartmouth Big Green football team =

American college football season

1990 Dartmouth Big Green football

Ivy League co-champion
- Conference: Ivy League
- Record: 7–2–1 (6–1 Ivy)
- Head coach: Buddy Teevens (4th season)
- Defensive coordinator: John Lyons (3rd season)
- Captains: Peter Chapman; Richard Joyce
- Home stadium: Memorial Field

1990 Ivy League football standings
	Conf.					Overall
Team	W		L		T	W		L		T
No. 17 Dartmouth +	6	–	1	–	0	7	–	2	–	1
Cornell +	6	–	1	–	0	7	–	3	–	0
Yale	5	–	2	–	0	6	–	4	–	0
Harvard	3	–	4	–	0	5	–	5	–	0
Penn	3	–	4	–	0	3	–	7	–	0
Princeton	2	–	5	–	0	3	–	7	–	0
Brown	2	–	5	–	0	2	–	8	–	0
Columbia	1	–	6	–	0	1	–	9	–	0
+ – Conference co-champions; Rankings from NCAA Division I-AA Football Committee poll

The 1990 Dartmouth Big Green football team was an American football team that represented Dartmouth College during the 1990 NCAA Division I-AA football season. The Big Green were co-champions of the Ivy League.

In its fourth under head coach Eugene "Buddy" Teevens, the team compiled a 7–2–1 record and outscored opponents 211 to 121. Peter Chapman and Richard Joyce were the team captains.

The Big Green's 6–1 conference record tied for first in the Ivy League standings. Dartmouth outscored Ivy opponents 147 to 65. Dartmouth shared the championship despite having defeated its co-champion, Cornell, in their head-to-head matchup.

The Big Green were unranked for most of the year, but entered the national Division I-AA top 20 toward the end of their six-game win streak, and were ranked No. 17 at the end of the year.

Dartmouth played its home games at Memorial Field on the college campus in Hanover, New Hampshire.

== Schedule ==
Date	Opponent	Rank	Site	Result	Attendance	Source
September 15	Penn		Memorial Field; Hanover, NH	L 6–16	8,119	
September 22	No. 20 Lehigh*		Memorial Field; Hanover, NH	W 33–14	4,229	
September 29	at No. 3 New Hampshire*		Cowell Stadium; Durham, NH (rivalry)	T 21–21	9,563	
October 6	at Holy Cross*		Fitton Field; Worcester, MA	L 10–21	13,211	
October 13	Yale		Memorial Field; Hanover, NH	W 27–17	10,130	
October 20	at Cornell		Schoellkopf Field; Ithaca, NY (rivalry)	W 11–6	12,000	
October 27	Harvard		Memorial Field; Hanover, NH (rivalry)	W 17–0	8,821	
November 3	Columbia		Memorial Field; Hanover, NH	W 34–20	5,113	
November 10	at Brown	No. 20	Brown Stadium; Providence, RI	W 29–0	2,100	
November 17	at Princeton	No. 17	Palmer Stadium; Princeton, NJ	W 23–6	9,842	
*Non-conference game; Rankings from NCAA Division I-AA Football Committee Poll released prior to the game
