= 1989 Dartmouth Big Green football team =

American college football season

1989 Dartmouth Big Green football
- Conference: Ivy League
- Record: 5–5 (4–3 Ivy)
- Head coach: Buddy Teevens (3rd season)
- Defensive coordinator: John Lyons (2nd season)
- Captains: Mark Johnson; Kevin Luensmann
- Home stadium: Memorial Field

1989 Ivy League football standings
	Conf.					Overall
Team	W		L		T	W		L		T
Yale +	6	–	1	–	0	8	–	2	–	0
Princeton +	6	–	1	–	0	7	–	2	–	1
Harvard	5	–	2	–	0	5	–	5	–	0
Dartmouth	4	–	3	–	0	5	–	5	–	0
Cornell	2	–	5	–	0	4	–	6	–	0
Penn	2	–	5	–	0	4	–	6	–	0
Brown	2	–	5	–	0	2	–	8	–	0
Columbia	1	–	6	–	0	1	–	9	–	0
+ – Conference co-champions

The 1989 Dartmouth Big Green football team was an American football team that represented Dartmouth College during the 1989 NCAA Division I-AA football season. Dartmouth finished fourth in the Ivy League.

In their third season under head coach Eugene "Buddy" Teevens, the Big Green compiled a 5–5 record and were outscored 178 to 170. Mark Johnson and Kevin Luensmann were the team captains.

The Big Green's 4–3 conference record placed fourth in the Ivy League standings. Dartmouth outscored Ivy opponents 115 to 82.

Dartmouth played its home games at Memorial Field on the college campus in Hanover, New Hampshire.

== Schedule ==
Date	Opponent	Site	Result	Attendance	Source
September 16	Princeton	Memorial Field; Hanover, NH	L 14–20	6,916	
September 23	Boston University*	Memorial Field; Hanover, NH	W 28–27	4,923	
September 30	at Bucknell*	Christy Mathewson–Memorial Stadium; Lewisburg, PA	L 20–36	4,280	
October 7	No. 3 Holy Cross*	Memorial Field; Hanover, NH	L 7–33	7,107	
October 14	No. 20 Yale	Memorial Field; Hanover, NH	L 19–24	15,431	
October 21	at Harvard	Harvard Stadium; Boston, MA (rivalry)	L 5–6	20,500	
October 28	at Cornell	Schoellkopf Field; Ithaca, NY (rivalry)	W 28–14	11,000	
November 4	at Columbia	Wien Stadium; New York, NY	W 13–12	4,830	
November 11	Brown	Memorial Field; Hanover, NH	W 12–6	3,753	
November 18	at Penn	Franklin Field; Philadelphia, PA	W 24–0	8,207	
*Non-conference game; Rankings from the latest NCAA Division I-AA poll released prior to the game
