= 1989 Brown Bears football team =

American college football season

1989 Brown Bears football
- Conference: Ivy League
- Record: 2–8 (2–5 Ivy)
- Head coach: John Rosenberg (6th season)
- Offensive coordinator: Les Steckel (1st season)
- Captains: J. Burke; D. Clark
- Home stadium: Brown Stadium

1989 Ivy League football standings
	Conf.					Overall
Team	W		L		T	W		L		T
Yale +	6	–	1	–	0	8	–	2	–	0
Princeton +	6	–	1	–	0	7	–	2	–	1
Harvard	5	–	2	–	0	5	–	5	–	0
Dartmouth	4	–	3	–	0	5	–	5	–	0
Cornell	2	–	5	–	0	4	–	6	–	0
Penn	2	–	5	–	0	4	–	6	–	0
Brown	2	–	5	–	0	2	–	8	–	0
Columbia	1	–	6	–	0	1	–	9	–	0
+ – Conference co-champions

The 1989 Brown Bears football team was an American football team that represented Brown University during the 1989 NCAA Division I-AA football season. Brown tied for second-to-last in the Ivy League.

In their sixth and final season under head coach John Rosenberg, the Bears compiled a 2–8 record and were outscored 264 to 168. J. Burke and D. Clark were the team captains.

The Bears' 2–5 conference record earned a three-way tie for fifth in the Ivy League standings. They were outscored 156 to 137 by Ivy opponents.

Brown played its home games at Brown Stadium in Providence, Rhode Island.

== Schedule ==
Date	Opponent	Site	Result	Attendance	Source
September 16	at Yale	Yale Bowl; New Haven, CT	L 3–12	11,252	
September 23	at Colgate*	Colgate Athletic Field; Hamilton, NY	L 7–42	1,800	
September 30	Rhode Island*	Brown Stadium; Providence, RI (rivalry)	L 13–18	8,500	
October 7	Princeton	Brown Stadium; Providence, RI	L 15–38	4,500	
October 14	at Penn	Franklin Field; Philadelphia, PA	L 30–32	10,879	
October 21	Cornell	Brown Stadium; Providence, RI	W 28–7	8,000	
October 28	at No. 8 Holy Cross*	Fitton Field; Worcester, MA	L 13–49	8,614	
November 4	Harvard	Brown Stadium; Providence, RI	L 14–27	10,700	
November 11	at Dartmouth	Memorial Field; Hanover, NH	L 6–12	3,753	
November 18	Columbia	Brown Stadium; Providence, RI	W 39–27	6,300	
*Non-conference game; Rankings from the latest NCAA Division I-AA poll released prior to the game
