= 1982 Dartmouth Big Green football team =

American college football season

1982 Dartmouth Big Green football

Ivy League co-champion
- Conference: Ivy League
- Record: 5–5 (5–2 Ivy)
- Head coach: Joe Yukica (5th season)
- Captains: Sean Mahler; David Neslund
- Home stadium: Memorial Field

1982 Ivy League football standings
	Conf.					Overall
Team	W		L		T	W		L		T
Harvard +	5	–	2	–	0	7	–	3	–	0
Penn +	5	–	2	–	0	7	–	3	–	0
Dartmouth +	5	–	2	–	0	5	–	5	–	0
Princeton	3	–	4	–	0	3	–	7	–	0
Yale	3	–	4	–	0	4	–	6	–	0
Brown	3	–	4	–	0	5	–	5	–	0
Cornell	3	–	4	–	0	4	–	6	–	0
Columbia	1	–	6	–	0	1	–	9	–	0
+ – Conference co-champions

The 1982 Dartmouth Big Green football team was an American football team that represented Dartmouth College during the 1982 NCAA Division I-AA football season. The Big Green were one of three co-champions of the Ivy League.

In its fifth season under head coach Joe Yukica, the team compiled a 5–5 record but was outscored 235 to 219. Sean Mahler and David Neslund were the team captains.

The Big Green's 5–2 conference record put them in a three-way tie atop the Ivy League standings. Dartmouth outscored Ivy opponents 170 to 145. Dartmouth had beaten both of its co-champions, Harvard and Penn, in head-to-head matchups.

This was Dartmouth's first year in Division I-AA, after having competed in the top-level Division I-A and its predecessors since 1881.

Dartmouth played its home games at Memorial Field on the college campus in Hanover, New Hampshire.

== Schedule ==
Date	Opponent	Site	Result	Attendance	Source
September 18	Penn	Memorial Field; Hanover, NH	L 0–21	8,500	
September 25	at No. 6 Holy Cross*	Fitton Field; Worcester, MA	L 12–28	18,861	
October 2	No. 7 Colgate*	Memorial Field; Hanover, NH	L 21–38	3,400	
October 9	at William & Mary*	Cary Field; Williamsburg, VA	L 16–24	14,400	
October 16	Harvard	Memorial Field; Hanover, NH (rivalry)	W 14–12	17,416	
October 23	at Cornell	Schoellkopf Field; Ithaca, NY (rivalry)	W 14–13	5,700	
October 30	Yale	Memorial Field; Hanover, NH	L 21–22	15,300	
November 6	Columbia	Memorial Field; Hanover, NH	W 56–41	5,100	
November 13	at Brown	Brown Stadium; Providence, RI	W 22–16	5,600	
November 20	at Princeton	Palmer Stadium; Princeton, NJ	W 43–20	3,200	
*Non-conference game; Rankings from the latest NCAA Division I-AA poll released prior to the game
