= 1990 Harvard Crimson football team =

American college football season

1990 Harvard Crimson football
- Conference: Ivy League
- Record: 5–5 (3–4 Ivy)
- Head coach: Joe Restic (20th season)
- Captain: Tom Callahan
- Home stadium: Harvard Stadium

1990 Ivy League football standings
	Conf.					Overall
Team	W		L		T	W		L		T
No. 17 Dartmouth +	6	–	1	–	0	7	–	2	–	1
Cornell +	6	–	1	–	0	7	–	3	–	0
Yale	5	–	2	–	0	6	–	4	–	0
Harvard	3	–	4	–	0	5	–	5	–	0
Penn	3	–	4	–	0	3	–	7	–	0
Princeton	2	–	5	–	0	3	–	7	–	0
Brown	2	–	5	–	0	2	–	8	–	0
Columbia	1	–	6	–	0	1	–	9	–	0
+ – Conference co-champions; Rankings from NCAA Division I-AA Football Committee poll

The 1990 Harvard Crimson football team was an American football team that represented Harvard University during the 1990 NCAA Division I-AA football season. The Crimson tied for fourth in the Ivy League.

In their 20th year under head coach Joe Restic, the Crimson compiled a 5–5 record and were outscored 206 to 199. Tom Callahan was the team captain.

Harvard's 3–4 conference record tied for fourth in the Ivy League standings. The Crimson were outscored 158 to 140 by Ivy opponents.

Harvard played its home games at Harvard Stadium in the Allston neighborhood of Boston, Massachusetts.

== Schedule ==
Date	Opponent	Site	Result	Attendance	Source
September 15	at Columbia	Wien Stadium; New York, NY	W 9–6	9,430	
September 22	Northeastern*	Harvard Stadium; Boston, MA	W 26–0	9,200	
September 29	at Holy Cross*	Fitton Field; Worcester, MA	L 14–35	14,106	
October 6	Cornell	Harvard Stadium; Boston, MA	L 17–20	16,300	
October 13	Fordham*	Harvard Stadium; Boston, MA	W 19–13	4,500	
October 20	at Princeton	Palmer Stadium; Princeton, NJ (rivalry)	W 23–20	24,345	
October 27	at Dartmouth	Memorial Field; Hanover, NH (rivalry)	L 0–17	8,821	
November 3	Brown	Harvard Stadium; Boston, MA	W 52–37	15,500	
November 10	at Penn	Franklin Field; Philadelphia, PA	L 20–24	17,918	
November 17	Yale	Harvard Stadium; Boston, MA (rivalry)	L 19–34	35,000	
*Non-conference game
