= 1990 Cornell Big Red football team =

American college football season

1990 Cornell Big Red football

Ivy League co-champion
- Conference: Ivy League
- Record: 7–3 (6–1 Ivy)
- Head coach: Jim Hofher (1st season)
- Defensive coordinator: Chuck Driesbach (1st season)
- Captains: Chris Cochrane; Rob Ryder; Paul Tully
- Home stadium: Schoellkopf Field

1990 Ivy League football standings
	Conf.					Overall
Team	W		L		T	W		L		T
No. 17 Dartmouth +	6	–	1	–	0	7	–	2	–	1
Cornell +	6	–	1	–	0	7	–	3	–	0
Yale	5	–	2	–	0	6	–	4	–	0
Harvard	3	–	4	–	0	5	–	5	–	0
Penn	3	–	4	–	0	3	–	7	–	0
Princeton	2	–	5	–	0	3	–	7	–	0
Brown	2	–	5	–	0	2	–	8	–	0
Columbia	1	–	6	–	0	1	–	9	–	0
+ – Conference co-champions; Rankings from NCAA Division I-AA Football Committee poll

The 1990 Cornell Big Red football team represented Cornell University in the 1990 NCAA Division I-AA football season as a member of the Ivy League. The Big Red were led by first-year head coach Jim Hofher and played their home games at Schoellkopf Field. The Big Red finished the season 7–3 overall and 6–1 in Ivy League play to win Cornell's third Ivy League championship, sharing the title with Dartmouth.

== Schedule ==
Date	Opponent	Site	Result	Attendance	Source
September 15	Princeton	Schoellkopf Field; Ithaca, NY	W 17–14	14,000	
September 22	at Colgate*	Andy Kerr Stadium; Hamilton, NY (rivalry)	L 24–59	5,805	
September 29	Bucknell*	Schoellkopf Field; Ithaca, NY	L 21–42	7,500	
October 6	at Harvard	Harvard Stadium; Boston, MA	W 20–17	16,300	
October 13	at Lafayette*	Fisher Stadium; Easton, PA	W 38–16	9,852	
October 20	Dartmouth	Schoellkopf Field; Ithaca, NY (rivalry)	L 6–11	12,000	
October 27	Brown	Schoellkopf Field; Ithaca, NY	W 34–7	16,000	
November 3	at Yale	Yale Bowl; New Haven, CT	W 41–31	16,576	
November 10	at Columbia	Wien Stadium; New York, NY (rivalry)	W 41–0	860	
November 17	Penn	Schoellkopf Field; Ithaca, NY (rivalry)	W 21–15	12,000	
*Non-conference game
