= 1982 Harvard Crimson football team =

American college football season

1982 Harvard Crimson football

Ivy League co-champion
- Conference: Ivy League
- Record: 7–3 (5–2 Ivy)
- Head coach: Joe Restic (12th season)
- Captain: Greg Brown
- Home stadium: Harvard Stadium

1982 Ivy League football standings
	Conf.					Overall
Team	W		L		T	W		L		T
Harvard +	5	–	2	–	0	7	–	3	–	0
Penn +	5	–	2	–	0	7	–	3	–	0
Dartmouth +	5	–	2	–	0	5	–	5	–	0
Princeton	3	–	4	–	0	3	–	7	–	0
Yale	3	–	4	–	0	4	–	6	–	0
Brown	3	–	4	–	0	5	–	5	–	0
Cornell	3	–	4	–	0	4	–	6	–	0
Columbia	1	–	6	–	0	1	–	9	–	0
+ – Conference co-champions

The 1982 Harvard Crimson football team was an American football team that represented Harvard University during the 1982 NCAA Division I-AA football season. The Crimson were one of three co-champions of the Ivy League.

In their 12th year under head coach Joe Restic, the Crimson compiled a 7–3 record and outscored opponents 259 to 136. Greg Brown was the team captain.

Harvard's 5–2 conference record put it in a three-way tie atop the Ivy League standings. The Crimson outscored Ivy opponents 191 to 88. Despite having the best in-conference and overall point differentials of the three, Harvard lost its head-to-head matchups against both of its co-champions, Dartmouth and Penn.

This was Harvard's first year in Division I-AA, after having competed in the top-level Division I-A and its predecessors since 1873.

Harvard played its home games at Harvard Stadium in the Allston neighborhood of Boston, Massachusetts.

== Schedule ==
Date	Time	Opponent	Site	Result	Attendance	Source
September 18		Columbia	Harvard Stadium; Boston, MA	W 27–16	8,500	
September 25		UMass*	Harvard Stadium; Boston, MA	W 31–14	12,500	
October 2	2:00 p.m.	at Army*	Michie Stadium; West Point, NY	L 13–17	39,830	
October 9		Cornell	Harvard Stadium; Boston, MA	W 25–13	8,000	
October 16		at Dartmouth	Memorial Field; Hanover, NH (rivalry)	L 12–14	17,416	
October 23		at Princeton	Palmer Stadium; Princeton, NJ (rivalry)	W 27–15	19,824	
October 30		Brown	Harvard Stadium; Boston, MA	W 34–0	18,000	
November 6		at No. 7 Holy Cross*	Fitton Field; Worcester, MA	W 24–17	20,681	
November 13		at Penn	Franklin Field; Philadelphia, PA	L 21–23	34,746	
November 20		Yale	Harvard Stadium; Boston, MA (The Game)	W 45–7	40,000	
*Non-conference game; Rankings from NCAA Division I-AA Football Committee Poll released prior to the game; All times are in Eastern time
