= Steve Tosches =

American football player and coach (born c. 1956)

Biographical details
- Born: 1956 (age 69–70)

Playing career
- 1974–1975: Idaho State
- 1977–1978: Rhode Island
- 1979: Hamilton Tiger-Cats
- Position: Quarterback

Coaching career (HC unless noted)
- 1980: Rhode Island (off. backs)
- 1981–1982: Maine (WR)
- 1983: Maine (off. backs)
- 1984: Maine (OC)
- 1985–1986: Princeton (OC)
- 1987–1999: Princeton

Head coaching record
- Overall: 78–50–2

Accomplishments and honors

Championships
- 3 Ivy League (1989, 1992, 1995)

Awards
- All-Yankee Conference (1978); All-New England (1978); All-East Division I-AA (1978); Scott M. Whitelaw Trophy (1989)

Steven P. Tosches (born c. 1956) is an American former college football coach. He was the head coach at Princeton University from 1987 to 1999. Tosches had previously served as an assistant on the coaching staffs at Princeton, the University of Maine, and the University of Rhode Island. He played college football as a quarterback at Idaho State and Rhode Island.

== Early life and playing career ==
Tosches attended Westhill High School in Stamford, Connecticut, and played on the football team as a quarterback. In 1973, the Connecticut Chapter of the National Football Hall of Fame honored Tosches as a scholar-athlete.

=== Idaho State ===
He attended college at Idaho State University, where as a freshman, he played quarterback on the football team in 1974.

=== Rhode Island ===
He transferred to the University of Rhode Island in 1976 to follow his head coach, Bob Griffin. After sitting out one season due to NCAA transfer rules, Tosches played on the football team from 1977 to 1978. In his final season, he earned places on the All-Yankee Conference, All-New England and All-East Division I-AA teams. He compiled 2,693 passing yards at Rhode Island and 4,772 over the course of his career. Tosches graduated from URI in 1979.

=== Hamilton Tiger-Cats ===
Tosches spent one season playing professional football for the Hamilton Tiger-Cats of the Canadian Football League (CFL).

== Coaching career ==
=== Early years ===
Tosches began his coaching career as an assistant under his former college coach Bob Griffin at Rhode Island in 1980. He was responsible for the team's offensive backfield. The following year, he took a job on the staff of head coach Ron Rogerson at the University of Maine, where he served as the wide receivers coach. In 1983, he held the title of offensive backfield coach, but had the responsibilities of offensive coordinator. In 1984, Tosches was promoted to offensive coordinator.

=== Princeton ===
Tosches followed Rogerson to Princeton University as his offensive coordinator. On August 8, 1987, Rogerson died of a heart attack while jogging at the age of 44, and Tosches was promoted as his replacement. He led the Tigers to the Ivy League championship in 1989, 1992, and 1995. After the 1989 season, he was awarded the Scott M. Whitelaw Trophy as the Eastern Division I-AA Coach of the Year. Tosches coached the Ivy League Senior All-Stars in the 1993 Epson Ivy Bowl in Tokyo, Japan. He failed to achieve a winning season from 1996 to 1999, and posted a 17–23 record over that period. Princeton fired Tosches in November 1999 and bought out the remaining time left on his contract.

== Honors ==
Tosches was inducted into the University of Rhode Island Athletic Hall of Fame in 1996.

== Head coaching record ==
Year	Team	Overall	Conference	Standing	Bowl/playoffs
Princeton Tigers (Ivy League) (1987–1999)
1987	Princeton	6–4	4–3	T–4th	
1988	Princeton	6–4	4–3	T–3rd	
1989	Princeton	7–2–1	6–1	T–1st	
1990	Princeton	3–7	2–5	T–6th	
1991	Princeton	8–2	5–2	2nd	
1992	Princeton	8–2	6–1	T–1st	
1993	Princeton	8–2	5–2	3rd	
1994	Princeton	7–3	4–3	T–2nd	
1995	Princeton	8–1–1	5–1–1	1st	
1996	Princeton	3–7	2–5	T–6th	
1997	Princeton	5–5	2–5	T–6th	
1998	Princeton	5–5	4–3	4th	
1999	Princeton	3–7	1–6	T–7th	
Princeton:		78–50–2	50–40–1		
Total:		78–50–2			
National championship Conference title Conference division title or championship game berth
