= 1982 Penn Quakers football team =

American college football season

1982 Penn Quakers football

Ivy League co-champion
- Conference: Ivy League
- Record: 7–3 (5–2 Ivy)
- Head coach: Jerry Berndt (2nd season)
- Captains: Michael Christiani; Chris DiMaria
- Home stadium: Franklin Field

1982 Ivy League football standings
	Conf.					Overall
Team	W		L		T	W		L		T
Harvard +	5	–	2	–	0	7	–	3	–	0
Penn +	5	–	2	–	0	7	–	3	–	0
Dartmouth +	5	–	2	–	0	5	–	5	–	0
Princeton	3	–	4	–	0	3	–	7	–	0
Yale	3	–	4	–	0	4	–	6	–	0
Brown	3	–	4	–	0	5	–	5	–	0
Cornell	3	–	4	–	0	4	–	6	–	0
Columbia	1	–	6	–	0	1	–	9	–	0
+ – Conference co-champions

The 1982 Penn Quakers football team was an American football team that represented the University of Pennsylvania during the 1982 NCAA Division I-AA football season. Penn was one of three co-champions of the Ivy League.

In their second year under head coach Jerry Berndt, the Quakers compiled a 7–3 record and outscored opponents 221 to 192.

Penn's 5–2 conference put it in a three-way tie atop the Ivy League standings. The Quakers outscored Ivy opponents 160 to 127. Penn won the head-to-head matchups with its co-champions, defeating Dartmouth in the first week of the season and beating Harvard in the second-to-last. Some argue this placed them at the top of the league.

This was Penn's first year in Division I-AA, after having competed in the top-level Division I-A and its predecessors since 1876.

After starting the year with three wins, the Quakers made several appearances in the weekly Division I-AA top 20 rankings. They were ranked No. 17 for the last week of the Ivy League season, but were unranked in the final rankings, which were released after their season-ending loss to Cornell.

Penn played its home games at Franklin Field adjacent to the university's campus in Philadelphia, Pennsylvania.

== Schedule ==
Date	Opponent	Rank	Site	Result	Attendance	Source
September 18	at Dartmouth		Memorial Field; Hanover, NH	W 21–0	8,500	
September 25	Lehigh*		Franklin Field; Philadelphia, PA	W 20–17	11,154	
October 2	Columbia		Franklin Field; Philadelphia, PA	W 51–31	13,563	
October 9	at Brown	No. 16	Brown Stadium; Providence, RI	W 24–21	6,500	
October 16	at Lafayette*	No. 10	Fisher Field; Easton, PA	L 20–35	10,000	
October 23	Yale	No. 17	Franklin Field; Philadelphia, PA	W 27–14	32,175	
October 30	at Princeton	No. 14	Palmer Stadium; Princeton, NJ (rivalry)	L 14–17	20,249	
November 6	No. 12 Colgate*		Franklin Field; Philadelphia, PA	W 21–13	12,212	
November 13	Harvard		Franklin Field; Philadelphia, PA (rivalry)	W 23–21	34,746	
November 20	at Cornell	No. 17	Schoellkopf Field; Ithaca, NY (rivalry)	L 0–23	9,500	
*Non-conference game; Rankings from NCAA Division I-AA Football Committee Poll released prior to the game
