= Coffey Field =

Stadium in New York, United States

Coordinates: 40°51′42″N 73°52′58″W

Jack Coffey Field
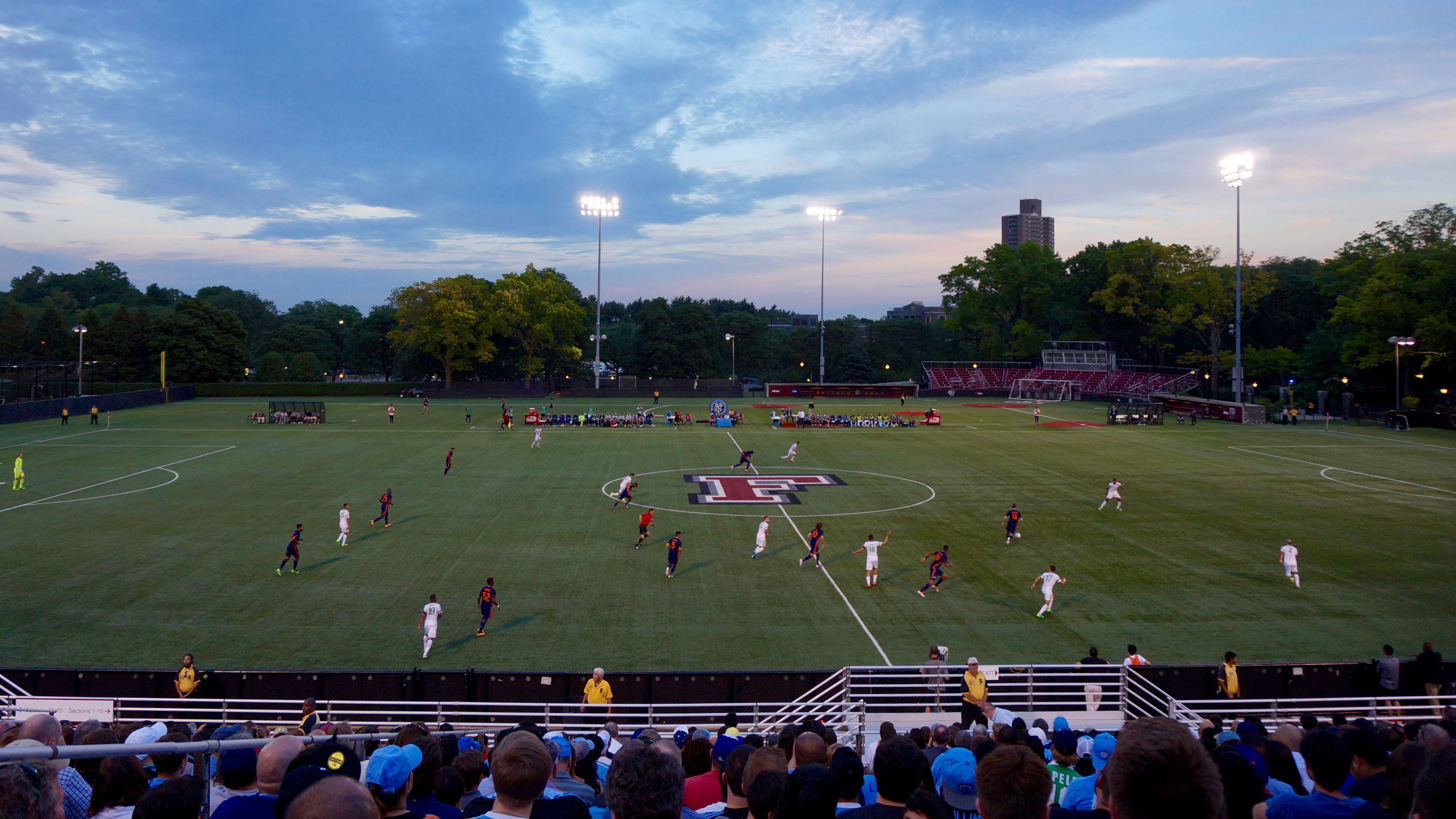
- The venue during a soccer match in 2016
- Interactive map of Jack Coffey Field
- Full name: Moglia Stadium at Jack Coffey Field
- Address: 441 East Fordham Road; The Bronx, NY; United States
- Owner: Fordham University
- Operator: Fordham Athletics
- Capacity: 7,000
- Type: Stadium
- Surface: FieldTurf (2005–present); Natural grass (1930–2004)
- Current use: Football; Soccer

Construction
- Opened: 1930; 96 years ago
- Renovated: 1990, 2004, 2014
- Architect: Jack L. Gordon Architects

Tenants
- Fordham Rams (NCAA) teams: football (1970–present); men's and women's soccer (2005–present); baseball (1930–2005)

Moglia Stadium at Jack Coffey Field is a 7,000-seat stadium located on the campus of Fordham University in The Bronx, New York. The stadium serves as Fordham Rams' home for football and men's and women's soccer.

The facility opened for baseball 96 years ago in 1930, and was named in 1954 for baseball coach and longtime athletic director Jack Coffey, four years before his 1958 retirement. The stadium was also home venue to the Rams' baseball team until it moved to Houlihan Park.

== History ==
Starting in 1964, students began using the left field and center field area for their club football team. The team was sponsored by the students themselves and it was these same students who rented temporary wooden stands, to be set around the gridiron, for the 1964 and 1965 seasons. The university stepped in to build permanent wooden stands behind the left field fence, which served as a grandstand for football. A press box and scoreboard were added in 1967, and the university reinstated varsity football for the 1970 season.

Fordham football moved up from Division III to Division I-AA (now Division I FCS) in 1989; the following year, the wooden stands were torn down and replaced with aluminum bleachers. Bathrooms and concessions were added beneath the new set of bleachers while an elevator was added to the new press box. Beneath the seats, a 3,200-square-foot (300 m^{2}) weight room was added in 1996.

Infilled synthetic FieldTurf replaced the natural grass field in 2005 while, behind home plate, other renovations during 2004 and 2005 included lights, new dugouts, as well as a new grandstand and press box for the baseball portion. This section of the facility now goes by Houlihan Park, as the recognized home of Rams baseball. The diamond is aligned approximately north-northeast (home plate to second base); the football field is in the outfield and runs west-southwest to east-northeast, from the left field foul line to center field, with the press box and grandstand along the north-northwest sideline.

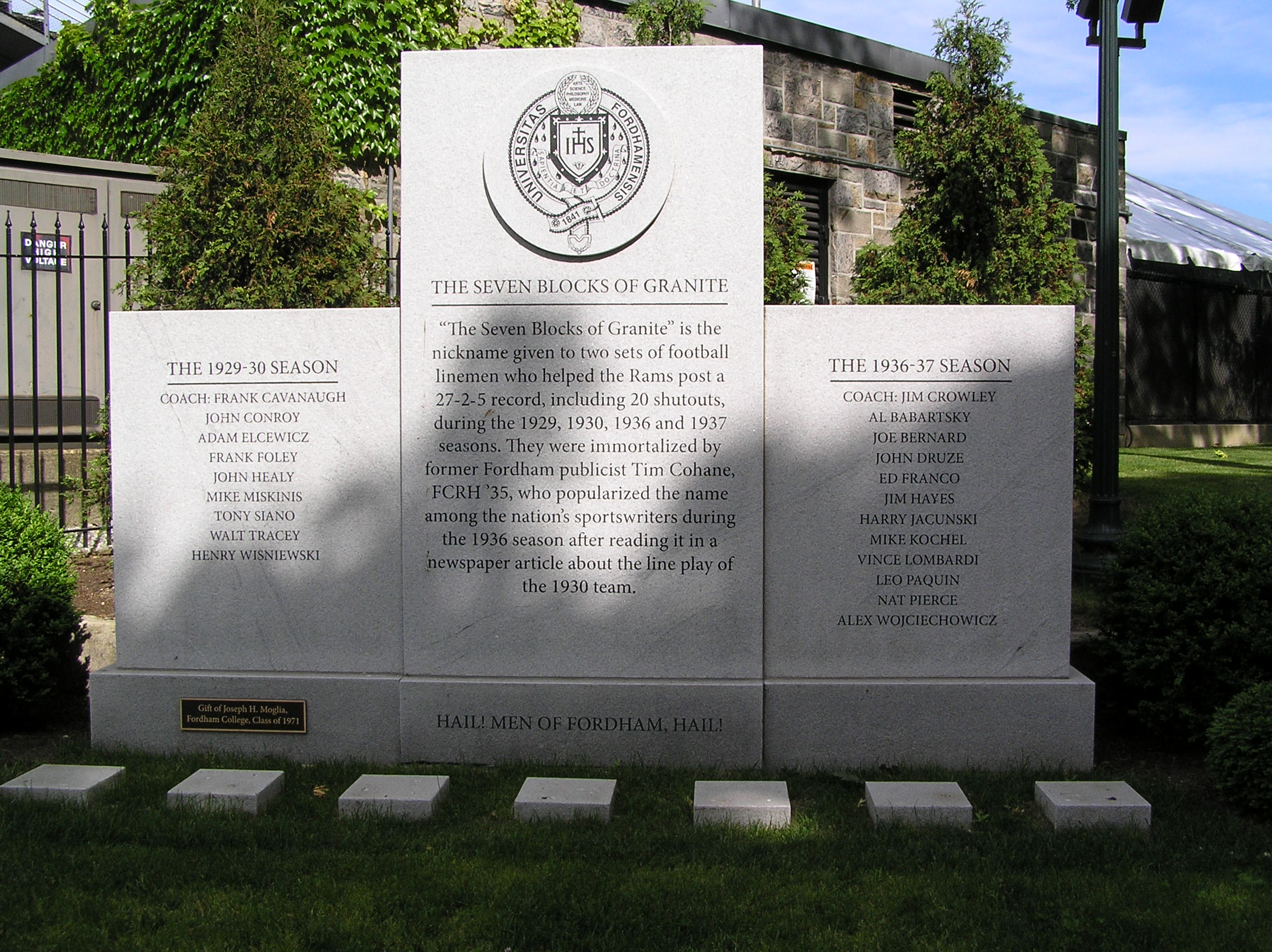
The Seven Blocks of Granite Monument, west of grandstand on Constitution Way

A monument to the Seven Blocks of Granite was dedicated in 2008, honoring the offensive lines of 1929, 1930, 1936, and 1937. It is located on Constitution Row, near the west end of the grandstand.

Renovations in 2014 included the addition of a full-color Daktronics video scoreboard beyond the Southern Boulevard endzone, as well as chair back seating between the 40-yard lines. The FieldTurf surface was upgraded with FieldTurfTM.

Professional soccer came to Jack Coffey Field in 2016 as it hosted the Fourth round U.S. Open Cup match between the New York Cosmos and NYCFC on June 15.

== Popular culture ==
Coffey Field was featured in the film Second Act where Trey (Milo Ventimiglia) trained his baseball team.

== See also ==
- Seven Blocks of Granite
- List of NCAA Division I FCS football stadiums
