= Princeton–Yale football rivalry =

American college football rivalry

- Princeton Tigers Yale Bulldogs
- Sport: Football
- First meeting: November 15, 1873; Princeton 3, Yale 0
- Latest meeting: November 14, 2026; Yale 28, Princeton 0
- Next meeting: November 13, 2027

Statistics
- Total meetings: 148
- All-time series: Yale leads, 83–55–10
- Largest victory: Yale, 51–14 (1931, 2019)
- Longest win streak: Yale, 14 (1967–1980)
- Current win streak: Yale, 5 (2022–present)

Locations of Princeton and Yale

The Princeton–Yale football rivalry is an American college football rivalry between the Princeton Tigers of Princeton University and the Yale Bulldogs of Yale University. The football rivalry is among the oldest in American sports.

== Significance ==
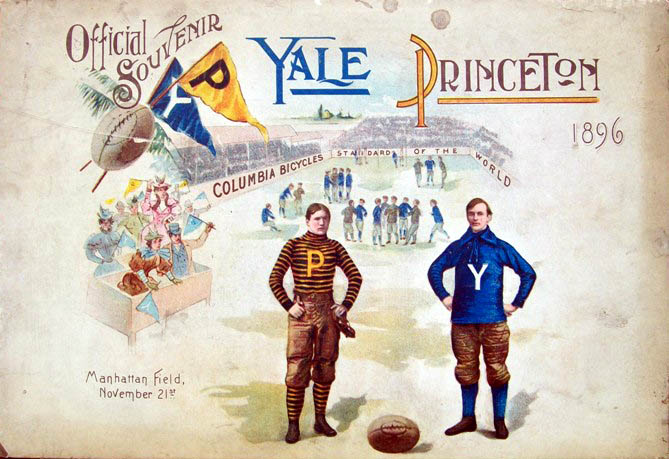
Souvenir of the game played at Manhattan Field, November 21, 1896

The rivalry is one of the oldest continuous rivalries in American sports, the oldest continuing rivalry in the history of American football, and is constituent to the Big Three academic, athletic and social rivalry among alumni and students associated with Harvard, Yale and Princeton universities.

The Kentucky Derby and Westminster Kennel Club Dog Show example American sporting events that are older or have been engaged continuously longer than this contest.

Princeton claims 28 collegiate football national championships. Yale claims 27 collegiate national football championship. Under the narrower historical championship count cited by the NCAA, however, Yale leads Princeton 18 to 15. The rivalry has also been played beyond the gridiron, with Princeton's Undergraduate Dean of Admissions hacking the Yale undergraduate admissions website in 2002.

Princeton and Yale first met on the gridiron in 1873 and soon dominated the sport. Princeton has been considered the best football program of the nineteenth century. Princeton played the University of Virginia in 1890, a contest considered the first major North–South intersectional football matchup. Princeton won, 116–0. Yale's record was 100–4–5 in the 1900s.

In the mid to late 20th century a saying regarding the fortunes of the Yale football program gained currency among different constituencies. As reported in the November 9, 1970, issue of Sports Illustrated, the saying offered that the alumni would rather beat Harvard, the coaches would rather beat Dartmouth, and "the players would rather beat Princeton".

Some past teams and participants have been noteworthy:

During the 25 seasons spanning 1869 through 1894 the consensus collegiate national champion was either Princeton (16 titles) or Yale (13 titles);

Three of four Heisman Trophy winners affiliated with Ivy League football programs participated in the rivalry: Clint Frank and Larry Kelley for Yale, and Dick Kazmaier for Princeton. Frank won the first Maxwell Award in 1937 and Kazmaier won the Award in 1951;

Twenty nine members of the College Football Hall of Fame have been associated with Yale's football program. Twenty six members of the Hall of Fame have been associated with Princeton's football program;

Princeton won the 1950 and 1951 Lambert Trophy. Princeton last claimed a collegiate national championship in 1950. Yale shared the Lambert in 1960 with the Navy team;

Footage from the 1903 game

The first time a movie camera recorded a football game was the November 14, 1903, Princeton–Yale contest. Thomas Alva Edison manned the camera;

Twenty-five teams, eleven representing Princeton and fourteen representing Yale, have won outright or shared the Ivy League football title;

Only The Rivalry, between Lafayette and Lehigh, has been contested more often in football.

The Princeton–Yale football rivalry, many contests scheduled on Thanksgiving at the Polo Grounds or in the New York metropolitan area during the late nineteenth century, is older and has been played more often than the Harvard–Yale, Army–Navy, Cornell–Penn, Columbia–Cornell, Penn State–Pitt, Amherst–Williams, Minnesota–Wisconsin, Indiana–Purdue, UNC–UVA, Auburn–Georgia, Cal–Stanford, or Andover–Exeter football rivalries.

Yale leads the series, 83–55–10.

== Notable contests ==
1873

College of New Jersey captain Cyrus Dershimer led the Tigers to victory, 3–0, November 15, 1873, in the inaugural contest. "A leather covered, egg-shaped projectile was tossed and kicked on a field that measured 120 yards in length and 75 yards in width." The College of New Jersey's trustees adopted the current name in 1896, announced during the school's sesquicentennial celebration.

1876

Yale won, 2–0, on Thanksgiving Day in Hoboken, New Jersey. The contest was the first football game of any type played on Thanksgiving Day.

1879

The 1879 game, a season-ending scoreless tie in Hoboken, was Frederic Remington's last game at Yale. Walter Camp captained the Yale team. The programs, College of New Jersey 4–0–1 and Yale 3–0–2, were named consensus co-national champions.

Remington, reputed to dunk his uniform in animal blood "to look more businesslike on the field," removed from New Haven to take care of his ailing father, then headed to the American frontier. Remington's illustrations of cowboys there became iconic images of the mythic West.

The contest has been considered the first in the series "played off school grounds" on a Thanksgiving.

1884

The 1884 contest ends in a scoreless tie in front of a noteworthy 15,000 spectators in New York City.

1888

Yale outscores opponents 698–0 during the season. Defeats College of New Jersey 10–0 to end season with 13–0 record.

1890

Yale won, 32–0, on Thanksgiving Day, in Brooklyn, New York. The victory is first of 37 consecutive wins, with 36 shutouts. Yale football letterwinner Federic Remington depicts on canvas a Yale athlete scoring a touchdown that is displayed prominently in Ray Tompkins House, the administrative headquarters for Yale athletics.

1891

Yale won, 19–0, at the Polo Grounds. Yale swept its 13-game schedule and held scoreless all thirteen opponents; in turn, Yale scored 488 points.

1893

The College of New Jersey's best team in the nineteenth century was the 1893 team. The squad defeated Yale, 6–0, on Thanksgiving Day in New York City. Princeton's victory was the only loss suffered by four time consensus All-American and College Football Hall of Famer Frank Hinkey during his Yale career. The victory ended Yale's thirty-seven game win streak.

1897

The Yale Banner 1956 opens its feature "end of an era", reporting Yale's football history up to the impending start of round-robin play among the appointed eight Ivy League programs in a few months, with the following quote, supposedly "from a father of a former player":

"And those girls in Blue! Mothers, sisters, sweethearts, their radiance is over you now. The loving worship of fair women for brave men, which preserves the courage of the human race is yours now.One and all of them would tear out their heart strings to bring you victory. Yale calls you. Where Yale calls there is no such thing as fail. Now go. Do or die like heroes and gentlemen and may the God of Battles crown the Blue with victory!" Yale won the game, 6–0.

Charles Ives, a composer who championed American vernacular stylings in American classical music, spectated the contest on November 20. The victory inspired the composer's Yale–Princeton Game.

Ives proposed successfully to Harmony Twichell after the 1905 contest in New Haven. Rev. Joseph Twichell, Ives's father-in-law, was a member of an investigative committee, convened at the behest of the Harvard Board of Overseers, to determine the extent of brutality, as well as character-building, on college and prep school gridirons post the notorious 1894 Harvard–Yale game. Groton founder Endicott Peabody was a committee member.

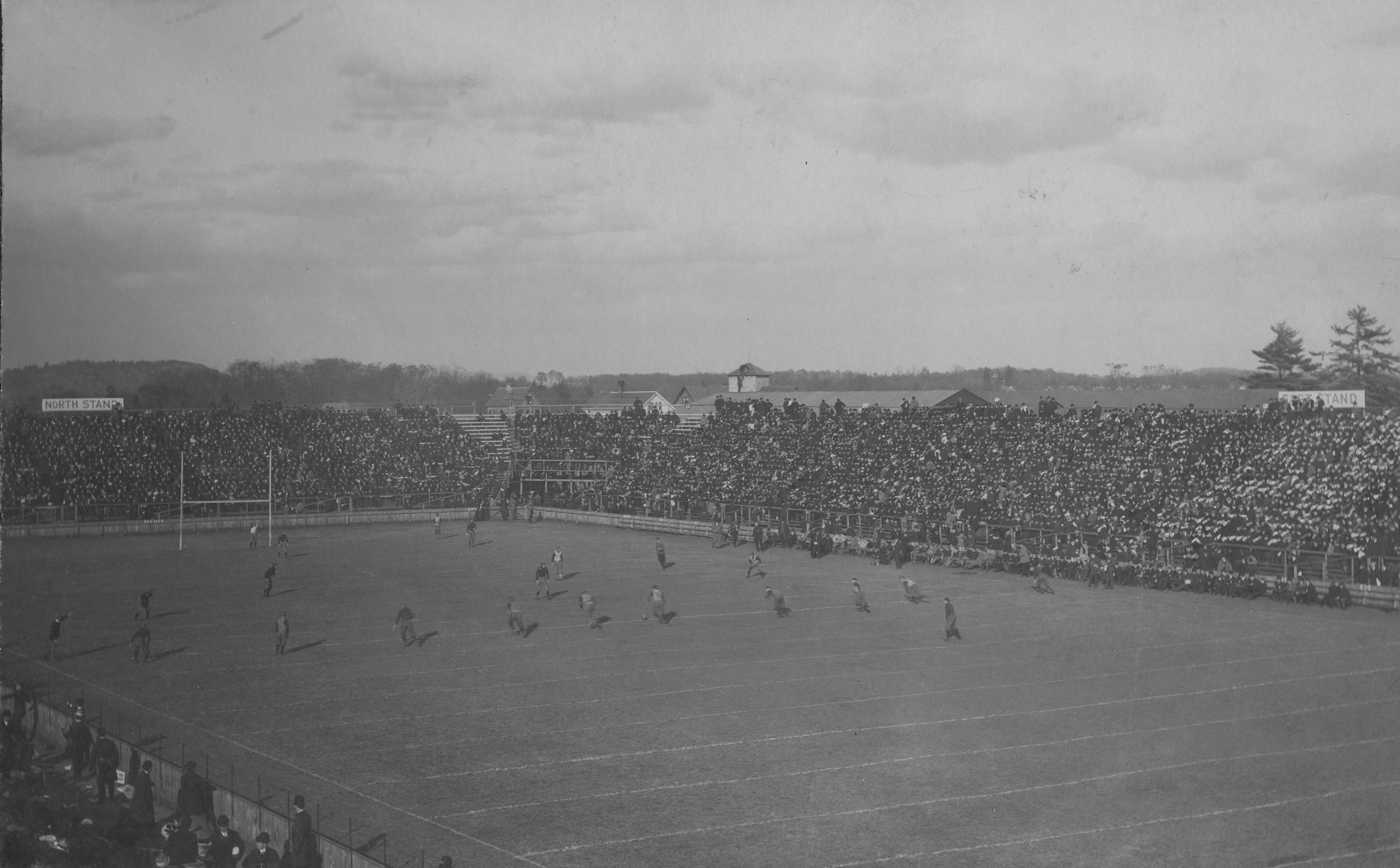
Kickoff of the 1901 game.

1906 Scoreless tie nets undefeated season for both programs and co-national championship. The season is first played under auspices of the NCAA's forerunner, the IAAUS, formed to reform unsportsmanlike play in the sport. The forward pass is now legal.

1914

Yale, by 19–14, won its debut at Palmer Stadium on November 14, 1914. Palmer Stadium is the second largest stadium in the country. Yale Bowl is the largest.

1922

Grantland Rice's Team of Destiny, the 1922 Princeton Tigers football team, completed an undefeated season with 6–0 victory. Bill Roper's squad is acknowledged as national champions for the season.

1934

November 17 was the last time eleven football athletes, future Downtown Athletic Club trophy winner Larry Kelley among them, as a unit played without substitutes to the final whistle from the opening kickoff in a major college football game. Yale defeated Princeton, 7–0, in front of 53,000 fans at Palmer Stadium.

Larry Kelley scored on a pass play of more than 80 yards as Yale defeated one of Princeton’s greatest teams as an underdog.

Princeton sought its sixteenth straight victory in a streak extending back to the 1933 season. Princeton coach Fritz Crisler, the acknowledged father of two-platoon football, guided the Tigers to a 7–1 record one year after an undefeated season and a national championship. The 1934 team outscored opponents 280–38.

The contest inspired two monographs. "Football's Last Iron Men: 1934, Yale vs. Princeton and One Stunning Upset" by Norman Macht, University of Nebraska Press, Bison Books, published in 2010, and "Yale's Ironmen: A Story of Football and Lives In The Decade of The Great Depression and Beyond" by New York Times sportswriter and Yale alumnus William N. Wallace, published by Iunverse Press in 2005.

1937

College Football Hall of Fame member Fritz Crisler coached his final game for Princeton versus Yale in 1937. Crisler's record was 2–3–1 versus his Yale counterparts (1–3 versus Ducky Pond) but he led Princeton to consensus national championships the two seasons he defeated Yale. Crisler coached against Yale's Downtown Athletic and Heisman Trophy winners Larry Kelley and Clint Frank, and he coached in the Ironmen game. He lost the 1937 contest, 26–0.

1949–1951

The 1949–1951 contests, each won by Princeton, featured Dick Kazmaier, the eventual winner of the 1951 Heisman Trophy, Maxwell Award, Walter Camp Award, and Associated Press Athlete of the Year. Kazmaier received 506 first place votes (first, second and third place votes are tallied) and 1,777 total points with the second-place finisher receiving, by contrast, 42 first place votes in the balloting. Kazmaier was a double threat—to run or to pass—in the single wing offense.

Princeton won 21–13, 47–12 in New Haven (most points ever scored by a visiting team at the Bowl) and 27–0. Kazmaier appeared on the cover of the November 19, 1951, issue of Time, two days after the 27–0 victory.

Kazmaier dominated the contests; he, for example, tossed three touchdown passes and ran for another touchdown in the 27–0 victory his senior season. (Earlier in the season Kazmaier and teammates crushed Harvard, 54–13.) Kazmaier won the coveted Heisman Trophy for the season.

1955

Princeton captain and future athletic director Royce Flippin led the Tigers to a 13–0 at packed and partisan Palmer Stadium. Over 46,000 spectators saw contest. "Overall, Yale is our biggest rival", Flippin remarked years later, "so we took the game seriously."

Yale defeated an able Army team the week before and was ranked nationally but Princeton provided unsolved problems for Yale. Flippin, who was later also athletic director at MIT, opened the scoring in the third quarter and Princeton won, 13–0, after Joe DiRenzo returned an interception for a touchdown late in the fourth quarter. Robert Casciola, later a head coach the program, was on the field for Princeton.

1960

The 1960 Ivy League football season ended with Yale 7–0 and Princeton 6–1. Yale, captained by Mike Pyle, who switched to offensive tackle from center for the season, won before 65,000 spectators at the Bowl. The 1960 Yale team is the program's sole undefeated, untied team since 1923. The team was ranked 14th in the season-ending AP poll, in front of 16th ranked Penn State and 19th ranked Syracuse.

Pyle captained the Chicago Bears during its 1963 NFL Championship season until the end of the 1969 season.

1967

Yale won 29–7 at Palmer Stadium, the first of fourteen consecutive victories versus Princeton. The Tigers had enjoyed a six-game winning streak versus the Bulldogs. Calvin Hill and Brian Dowling led the Bulldogs during the contest. Cheerleading captain George W. Bush lead Yalies post-contest. Bush was arrested by local police for attempting to tear down a goalpost.

1979

Yale won 35–10, led by future three time Super Bowl winner Ken Hill. The running back gained 129 yards on 19 carries. Yale was undefeated at 5–0 in the League and Princeton 4–1 before kickoff. Yale clinched sole possession of the football title with the lop-sided victory. The next day's Sunday New York Times game story headline announced "Yale Takes Game, Ivy Crown And Purloined Mascot Home".

At halftime Handsome Dan XII, named Bingo (and, in fact, a female pedigreed bulldog in the care of Yale professor Rollie Osterweiss), was returned to caregivers. Princeton undergrads Mark Hallam, Jamie Herbert, Rod Sheperd, and Scott Thompson posed as members of the Yale cheerleading squad and requested Bingo's appearance for publicity photographs. Osterweiss obliged the perpetrators. Bingo, adorned with an orange and black scarf, was handed off to actual Yale cheerleaders at halftime.

1981

Princeton, in Palmer Stadium, ended a fourteen-game loss streak to Yale, 35–31, November 14. Bob Holly, a future Super Bowl champion with the Washington Redskins, passed for 501 yards and wide receiver Derek Graham accounted for 278 yards, both Princeton records. Rich Diana ran for a Yale record 222 yards.

The Princeton Athletic News deemed the contest the Princeton game of the century.

Yale was 8–0 including a nationally televised "upset" victory versus Navy. Yale Head Coach Carm Cozza's record was 14–1 versus Princeton before the final whistle. Princeton had a 3–4–1 overall record, and had lost to Maine 55–44 the week before.

Holly, a right handed quarterback, scored the winning touchdown on a left roll out with four seconds remaining.

1988

Jason Garrett, captain of the 1988 Princeton team and Asa S. Bushnell Award winner as the Ivy League Player of the Year, quarterbacked a 24–7 victory over Yale in New Haven. Garrett, who played professionally in three leagues and won two Super Bowl rings with the Dallas Cowboys, is the former head coach of the Cowboys. Garrett was named NFL Coach of the Year for the 2016 season.

1997

Princeton defeated Yale 9–0 in front of a little more than 6,000 spectators on a blustery and cloudy afternoon at the Meadowlands, home to the NFL New York Jets and New York Giants. The following day's New York Times game story, by William N. Wallace, began: "A century ago Princeton – Yale was the game, played at the Polo Grounds in New York from 1887 to 1896 before capacity crowds." That was not the case across the Hudson River just west of the mentioned Polo Grounds, now home to a rundown New York City Housing Authority development.

The Princeton Tigers football team spent the season on the road while Princeton Stadium was constructed. The Yale game was the sole game Princeton played in New Jersey in 1997. Palmer Stadium had been demolished for the construction of Princeton Stadium on the same site. William Powers, once an All Ivy punter for Princeton, contributed $10 million to the Princeton athletic department. Princeton Stadium's playing surface is named in honor of his family.

== Game results ==
Princeton victories	Yale victories	Tie games

No.	Date	Location	Winner	Score
1	November 15, 1873	New Haven, CT	Princeton	3–0
2	November 30, 1876	Hoboken, NJ	Yale	2–0
3	December 8, 1877	Hoboken, NJ	Tie	0–0
4	November 28, 1878	Hoboken, NJ	Princeton	1–0
5	November 27, 1879	Hoboken, NJ	Tie	0–0
6	November 25, 1880	New York, NY	Tie	0–0
7	November 24, 1881	New York, NY	Tie	0–0
8	November 30, 1882	New York, NY	Yale	2–1
9	November 24, 1883	New York, NY	Yale	6–0
10	November 27, 1884	New York, NY	Tie	0–0
11	November 21, 1885	New Haven, CT	Princeton	6–5
12	November 25, 1886	Princeton, NJ	Tie	0–0
13	November 19, 1887	New York, NY	Yale	12–0
14	November 24, 1888	New York, NY	Yale	10–0
15	November 28, 1889	New York, NY	Princeton	10–0
16	November 27, 1890	Brooklyn, NY	Yale	32–0
17	November 26, 1891	New York, NY	Yale	19–0
18	November 24, 1892	New York, NY	Yale	12–0
19	November 30, 1893	New York, NY	Princeton	6–0
20	December 1, 1894	New York, NY	Yale	24–0
21	November 23, 1895	New York, NY	Yale	20–10
22	November 21, 1896	New York, NY	Princeton	24–6
23	November 20, 1897	New Haven, CT	Yale	6–0
24	November 12, 1898	Princeton, NJ	Princeton	6–0
25	November 25, 1899	New Haven, CT	Princeton	11–10
26	November 17, 1900	Princeton, NJ	Yale	29–5
27	November 16, 1901	New Haven, CT	Yale	12–0
28	November 15, 1902	Princeton, NJ	Yale	12–5
29	November 14, 1903	New Haven, CT	Princeton	11–6
30	November 12, 1904	Princeton, NJ	Yale	12–0
31	November 18, 1905	New Haven, CT	Yale	23–4
32	November 17, 1906	Princeton, NJ	Tie	0–0
33	November 16, 1907	New Haven, CT	Yale	12–10
34	November 14, 1908	Princeton, NJ	Yale	11–6
35	November 13, 1909	New Haven, CT	Yale	17–0
36	November 12, 1910	Princeton, NJ	Yale	5–3
37	November 18, 1911	New Haven, CT	Princeton	6–3
38	November 16, 1912	Princeton, NJ	Tie	6–6
39	November 15, 1913	New Haven, CT	Tie	3–3
40	November 14, 1914	Princeton, NJ	Yale	19–14
41	November 13, 1915	New Haven, CT	Yale	13–7
42	November 18, 1916	Princeton, NJ	Yale	10–0
43	November 15, 1919	New Haven, CT	Princeton	13–6
44	November 13, 1920	Princeton, NJ	Princeton	20–0
45	November 12, 1921	New Haven, CT	Yale	13–7
46	November 18, 1922	Princeton, NJ	Princeton	3–0
47	November 17, 1923	New Haven, CT	Yale	27–0
48	November 15, 1924	Princeton, NJ	Yale	10–0
49	November 14, 1925	New Haven, CT	Princeton	25–12
50	November 13, 1926	Princeton, NJ	Princeton	10–7
51	November 12, 1927	New Haven, CT	Yale	14–6
52	November 17, 1928	Princeton, NJ	Princeton	12–2
53	November 16, 1929	New Haven, CT	Yale	13–0
54	November 15, 1930	Princeton, NJ	Yale	10–7
55	November 21, 1931	New Haven, CT	Yale	51–14
56	November 12, 1932	Princeton, NJ	Tie	7–7
57	December 2, 1933	New Haven, CT	Princeton	27–2
58	November 17, 1934	Princeton, NJ	Yale	7–0
59	November 30, 1935	New Haven, CT	Princeton	38–7
60	November 14, 1936	Princeton, NJ	Yale	26–23
61	November 13, 1937	New Haven, CT	Yale	26–0
62	November 12, 1938	Princeton, NJ	Princeton	20–7
63	November 18, 1939	New Haven, CT	Princeton	13–7
64	November 16, 1940	Princeton, NJ	Princeton	10–7
65	November 15, 1941	New Haven, CT	Princeton	20–6
66	November 14, 1942	New York, NY	Yale	13–6
67	November 13, 1943	New Haven, CT	Yale	27–6
68	November 24, 1945	Princeton, NJ	Yale	20–14
69	November 16, 1946	New Haven, CT	Yale	30–2
70	November 15, 1947	Princeton, NJ	Princeton	17–0
71	November 13, 1948	New Haven, CT	Princeton	20–14
72	November 12, 1949	Princeton, NJ	Princeton	21–13
73	November 18, 1950	New Haven, CT	Princeton	47–12
74	November 17, 1951	Princeton, NJ	Princeton	27–0
75	November 15, 1952	New Haven, CT	Princeton	27–21

No.	Date	Location	Winner	Score
76	November 14, 1953	Princeton, NJ	Yale	26–24
77	November 13, 1954	New Haven, CT	Princeton	21–14
78	November 12, 1955	Princeton, NJ	Princeton	13–0
79	November 17, 1956	New Haven, CT	Yale	42–20
80	November 16, 1957	Princeton, NJ	Yale	20–13
81	November 15, 1958	New Haven, CT	Princeton	50–14
82	November 14, 1959	Princeton, NJ	Yale	38–20
83	November 12, 1960	New Haven, CT	Yale	43–22
84	November 18, 1961	Princeton, NJ	Princeton	26–16
85	November 17, 1962	New Haven, CT	Princeton	14–10
86	November 16, 1963	Princeton, NJ	Princeton	27–7
87	November 14, 1964	New Haven, CT	Princeton	35–14
88	November 13, 1965	Princeton, NJ	Princeton	31–6
89	November 12, 1966	New Haven, CT	Princeton	13–7
90	November 18, 1967	Princeton, NJ	Yale	29–7
91	November 16, 1968	New Haven, CT	Yale	42–17
92	November 15, 1969	Princeton, NJ	Yale	17–14
93	November 14, 1970	New Haven, CT	Yale	27–22
94	November 13, 1971	Princeton, NJ	Yale	10–6
95	November 18, 1972	New Haven, CT	Yale	31–7
96	November 17, 1973	Princeton, NJ	Yale	30–13
97	November 16, 1974	New Haven, CT	Yale	19–6
98	November 15, 1975	Princeton, NJ	Yale	24–13
99	November 6, 1976	New Haven, CT	Yale	39–7
100	November 5, 1977	Princeton, NJ	Yale	44–8
101	November 11, 1978	New Haven, CT	Yale	23–7
102	November 10, 1979	Princeton, NJ	Yale	35–10
103	November 15, 1980	New Haven, CT	Yale	25–13
104	November 14, 1981	Princeton, NJ	Princeton	35–31
105	November 13, 1982	New Haven, CT	Yale	37–19
106	November 12, 1983	Princeton, NJ	Yale	28–21
107	November 10, 1984	New Haven, CT	Yale	27–24
108	November 16, 1985	Princeton, NJ	Princeton	21–12
109	November 15, 1986	New Haven, CT	Yale	14–13
110	November 14, 1987	Princeton, NJ	Yale	34–19
111	November 12, 1988	New Haven, CT	Princeton	24–7
112	November 11, 1989	Princeton, NJ	Yale	14–7
113	November 10, 1990	New Haven, CT	Yale	34–7
114	November 16, 1991	Princeton, NJ	Princeton	22–16
115	November 14, 1992	New Haven, CT	Princeton	36–7
116	November 13, 1993	Princeton, NJ	Princeton	28–7
117	November 12, 1994	New Haven, CT	Princeton	19–6
118	November 11, 1995	Princeton, NJ	Yale	21–13
119	November 16, 1996	New Haven, CT	Princeton	17–13
120	November 15, 1997	East Rutherford, NJ	Princeton	9–0
121	November 14, 1998	New Haven, CT	Yale	31–28
122	November 13, 1999	Princeton, NJ	Yale	23–21
123	November 11, 2000	New Haven, CT	Princeton	19–14
124	November 10, 2001	Princeton, NJ	Princeton	34–14
125	November 16, 2002	New Haven, CT	Yale	7–3
126	November 15, 2003	Princeton, NJ	Yale	27–24
127	November 13, 2004	New Haven, CT	Yale	21–9
128	November 12, 2005	Princeton, NJ	Yale	21–14
129	November 11, 2006	New Haven, CT	Princeton	34–31
130	November 10, 2007	Princeton, NJ	Yale	27–6
131	November 15, 2008	New Haven, CT	Yale	14–0
132	November 14, 2009	Princeton, NJ	Princeton	24–17
133	November 13, 2010	New Haven, CT	Yale	14–13
134	November 12, 2011	Princeton, NJ	Yale	33–24
135	November 10, 2012	New Haven, CT	Princeton	29–7
136	November 16, 2013	Princeton, NJ	Princeton	59–23
137	November 15, 2014	New Haven, CT	Yale	44–30
138	November 14, 2015	Princeton, NJ	Yale	35–28
139	November 12, 2016	New Haven, CT	Princeton	31–3
140	November 11, 2017	Princeton, NJ	Yale	35–31
141	November 10, 2018	New Haven, CT	Princeton	59–43
142	November 16, 2019	Princeton, NJ	Yale	51–14
143	November 13, 2021	Princeton, NJ	Princeton	35–20
144	November 12, 2022	New Haven, CT	Yale	24–20
145	November 11, 2023	Princeton, NJ	Yale	36–28
146	November 16, 2024	New Haven, CT	Yale	42–28
147	November 15, 2025	Princeton, NJ	Yale	13–10
148	November 14, 2026	New Haven, CT	Yale	28–0
Series: Yale leads 83–55–10

== See also ==
- List of NCAA college football rivalry games
- List of most-played college football series in NCAA Division I
