= List of college football games played outside the United States =

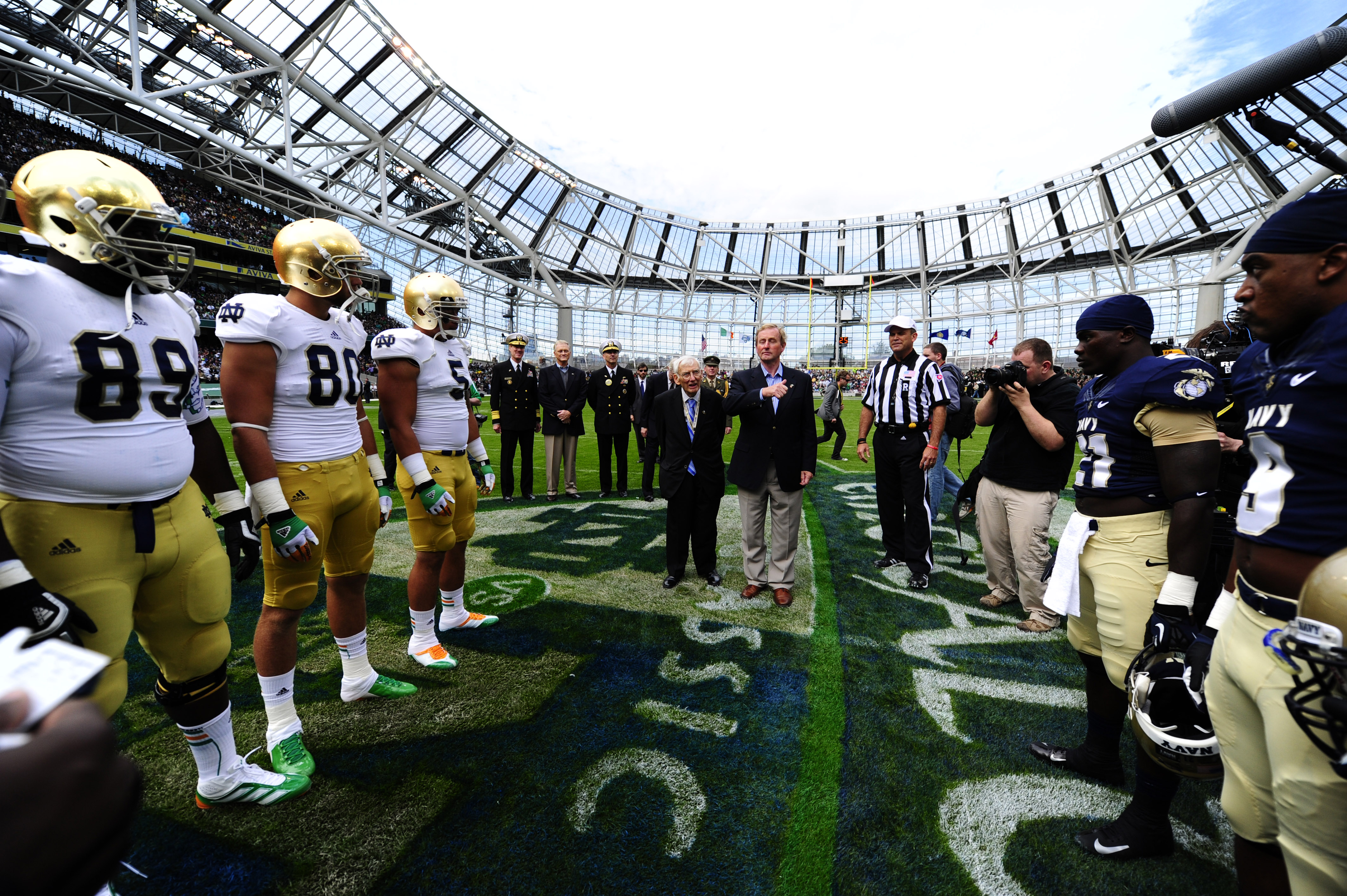
Notre Dame and Navy captains take part in the 2012 Emerald Isle Classic in Dublin.

In the United States, college football has been played since the 1869 season when Princeton and Rutgers played the first game. In the early years of the game, the American University Harvard University and Canadian University McGill University developed a rivalry that is credited with the establishment of modern American football. The first game played outside the United States occurred on October 23, 1874, when the Crimson defeated McGill 3–0 at Montreal, Quebec. Several other games were played during the early years of the game in Canada until the differences between American and Canadian football became significant enough that Canadian and American universities ceased playing one-another. In addition to the early Canadian games, several teams competed in the Bacardi Bowl at Havana, Cuba until it was discontinued after the 1946 edition of the game.

Although not common, National Collegiate Athletic Association (NCAA) rules allow for member institutions to compete in regular season games scheduled in foreign countries no more than once every four years. The first of these games occurred in 1976 when Grambling State defeated Morgan State in the Pioneer Bowl at Korakuen Stadium in Tokyo. After that initial game, a regular season game called the Mirage Bowl (later called the Coca-Cola Classic) was played in Tokyo from 1977 to 1993. Since 1977, regular season games have also been played in Australia, Bermuda, Germany, Ireland, Italy, and the United Kingdom.

In April 2006, the NCAA announced Toronto was awarded a postseason bowl game to be played at Rogers Centre. The International Bowl was the first bowl game played outside the United States since the Bacardi Bowl in 1937. However, the game was discontinued after its 2010 edition. Two international games were played as part of the 2014 NCAA Division I FBS football season. Penn State and UCF played their season opener in the Croke Park Classic at Dublin, and the Bahamas Bowl had its inaugural edition at Thomas Robinson Stadium in Nassau in December 2014 and its second edition on December 24, 2015. The Bahamas Bowl has continued as part of the bowl schedule ever since. Two regular-season games were scheduled for 2016: the first game of the season, with California and Hawaiʻi playing at ANZ Stadium in Sydney, and a return to Dublin's Aviva Stadium, this time with Boston College playing Georgia Tech.

In addition to those played, several international games have been proposed from time-to-time that were never actually played. In 1989, USC and Illinois were scheduled to open their season in the Glasnost Bowl at Dynamo Stadium in Moscow. However, the game was canceled and moved to the Los Angeles Memorial Coliseum due to the logistics of undertaking a college football game in the Soviet Union. In 1996, the Haka Bowl was scheduled for play at Auckland, New Zealand, but its certification was subsequently revoked by the NCAA due to financing concerns. In 2013, bowl games were proposed for both Dublin, Ireland and Dubai, United Arab Emirates, but neither was certified by the NCAA for play. In both 2020 and 2021, the Emerald Isle Classic played at Dublin, Ireland was canceled due to the impacts of the COVID-19 pandemic. The Ireland event returned for 2022, with a new sponsored name of Aer Lingus College Football Classic.

== Games ==
List of games showing date, season, score, opponents, stadium, city, country, attendance and other notes (Note: This listing does not include games played at Simon Fraser University in Burnaby, Canada. The Red Leafs (formerly Clan) competed as NAIA members from 1965 to 2001 and also in 2010, and from 2011 to 2022 competed as the lone international member of the NCAA before dropping football.)
Date	Season (Note: Links to the overall college football season article. In the case of games involving teams from different NCAA divisions, the season article linked to is that of the higher division represented by said teams.)	Score	Winning team (Note: Links to the season article for the opponent when available or to their general page when unavailable.)	Winning conference	Losing team	Losing conference	Stadium	City	Country	Attendance	Notes/References
October 23, 1874	1874	3–0	Harvard	Independent	McGill	Independent	Montreal Cricket Grounds	Montreal	Canada	2,000	
October 23, 1875	1875	1–0	Harvard	Independent	Montreal FBC	Independent	Montreal Cricket Grounds	Montreal	Canada		
October 30, 1876	1876	1–0	Harvard	Independent	McGill	Independent	Montreal Cricket Grounds	Montreal	Canada		
October 26, 1877	1877	1–0	Harvard	Independent	McGill	Independent	Montreal Cricket Grounds	Montreal	Canada		
November 1, 1879	1879	1–0	Harvard	Independent	Britannias FBC	Independent		Montreal	Canada		
November 3, 1879	1879	0–0	Harvard	Independent	McGill	Independent	Montreal Cricket Grounds	Montreal	Canada		
November 1, 1880	1880	2–1	Harvard	Independent	Ottawa FBC	Independent		Ottawa	Canada		
November 2, 1880	1880	0–0	Harvard	Independent	Montreal FBC	Independent	Montreal Cricket Grounds	Montreal	Canada		
November 6, 1880	1880	13–6	Michigan	Independent	Toronto	Independent	Toronto Lacrosse Club	Toronto	Canada		
October 29, 1881	1881	0–0	Harvard	Independent	Britannias FBC	Independent		Montreal	Canada		
November 7, 1885	1885	8–2	Michigan	Independent	Windsor	Independent		Windsor	Canada		Was played under Canadian rules
November 5, 1898	1898	10–5	Vermont	Independent	Ogdensburg A.A.	Independent	M.A.A.C. Grounds	Montreal	Canada		
December 25, 1907	1907	56–0	LSU	SIAA	Havana	Independent	Almandares Park	Havana	Cuba	10,000	Was played as the Bacardi Bowl
January 1, 1910	1909	11–0	Cuban Athletic Club	Independent	Tulane	Independent	Almandares Park	Havana	Cuba		Was played as the Bacardi Bowl
January 1, 1912	1911	12–0	Mississippi A&M	SIAA	Cuban Athletic Club	Independent	Almandares Park	Havana	Cuba		Was played as the Bacardi Bowl
October 28, 1912	1912	49–1	Carlisle	Independent	Toronto	None		Toronto	Canada		Was played as exhibition with the first half played under American and the second half under Canadian rules
November 2, 1912	1912	12–0	Assumption	Independent	Michigan State Normal	Independent		Windsor	Canada		
December 25, 1912	1912	28–0	Florida	SIAA	Vedado Tennis Club	Independent	Almandares Park	Havana	Cuba	1,500	Was played as the Bacardi Bowl
October 9, 1915	1915	33–0	Michigan State Normal	Independent	Assumption	Independent		Windsor	Canada		
October 17, 1917	1917	28–0	Michigan State Normal	Independent	Assumption	Independent		Windsor	Canada		
October 9, 1920	1920	27–13	Michigan State Normal	MIAA	Assumption	Independent		Windsor	Canada		
November 5, 1921	1921	13–0	Syracuse	Independent	McGill	Independent	Percival Molson Memorial Stadium	Montreal	Canada		
December 31, 1921	1921	14–0	Cuban Athletic Club	Independent	Ole Miss	SIAA	Almandares Park	Havana	Cuba		Was played as the Bacardi Bowl
October 7, 1922	1922	13–0	Michigan State Normal	MIAA	Assumption	Independent		Windsor	Canada		
October 15, 1927	1927	26–7	Michigan State Normal	MCC	Assumption	Independent		Windsor	Canada		
November 28, 1927	1927	20–6	Howard (AL)	SIAA	Universidad Nacional	Independent	Vedado Tennis Club	Havana	Cuba		
November 20, 1929	1929	28–0	Mississippi College	SIAA	UNAM	Independent	Estadio Val Buena	Mexico City	Mexico	75,000	
December 30, 1934	1934	25–0	Tampa	Independent	Club Atlético de Cuba	Independent	Polar Stadium	Havana	Cuba		
January 1, 1937	1936	7–7	Auburn	SEC	Villanova	Independent	La Tropical Stadium	Havana	Cuba		Was played as the Bacardi Bowl
October 28, 1944	1944	7–6	Idaho Southern Branch	Independent	Edmonton AAB	Independent	Clarke Stadium	Edmonton	Canada	5,500	Was played as exhibition against a squad of U.S. military servicemen called the Alaska Clippers
October 5, 1945	1945	27–0	Winnipeg Blue Bombers	WIFU	North Dakota State	NCC	Osborne Stadium	Winnipeg	Canada		
November 6, 1946	1946	12–0	Nevada	Independent	Edmonton AAB	Independent	Clarke Stadium	Edmonton	Canada	1,500	Was played as exhibition against a squad of U.S. military servicemen called the Alaska Clippers
December 7, 1946	1946	55–0	Mississippi Southern	Independent	Havana	Independent	La Tropical Stadium	Havana	Cuba		Was played as the Bacardi Bowl
October 23, 1948	1948	28–6	North Dakota State	NCC	Manitoba	Independent		Winnipeg	Canada		
September 19, 1954	1954	31–26	Tampa	Independent	National Polytechnic Institute	Independent	Estadio Universitario	Mexico City	Mexico	18,000	
September 25, 1954	1954	13–6	UNAM	Independent	Howard (AL)	Independent	Estadio Universitario	Mexico City	Mexico	10,000	
October 1, 1954	1954	19–6	Eastern New Mexico	Independent	Notre Dame (Canada)	Independent	Taylor Field	Regina	Canada	4,000	Was the first night game played at Taylor Field and was played under American rules
October 21, 1961	1961	60–8	McNeese State	Gulf States Conference	Instituto Politécnico Nacional	Independent	Estadio Olímpico Universitario	Mexico City	Mexico	30,000	
December 2, 1961	1961	62–22	Lamar Tech	Lone Star Conference	Instituto Politécnico Nacional	Independent	Estadio Olímpico Universitario	Mexico City	Mexico	20,000	
October 26, 1962	1962	52–6	Northwestern State	Gulf States Conference	Instituto Politécnico Nacional	Independent	Estadio Olímpico Universitario	Mexico City	Mexico		
October 26, 1963	1963	26–14	Howard (AL)	Independent	UNAM	Independent	Estadio Olímpico Universitario	Mexico City	Mexico	25,000	
December 7, 1963	1963	33–26	Lamar Tech	Independent	Instituto Politécnico Nacional	Independent	Estadio Olímpico Universitario	Mexico City	Mexico	48,000	
November 29, 1969	1969	49–6	Trinity (TX)	Southland Conference	UNAM	Independent	Estadio Olímpico Universitario	Mexico City	Mexico		
June 1, 1976	1976	17–8	Texas A&I	Lone Star Conference	Henderson State	AIC	Olympiastadion	West Berlin	West Germany	9,000	Was the first college football game in Europe
June 5, 1976	1976	21–7	Texas A&I	Lone Star Conference	Henderson State	AIC	Prater Stadium	Vienna	Austria	18,000	
June 12, 1976	1976	20–6	Texas A&I	Lone Star Conference	Henderson State	AIC		Mannheim	West Germany		"mostly U.S. military personnel in the stands"
June 1976	1976	17–5	Texas A&I	Lone Star Conference	Henderson State	AIC		Nuremberg	West Germany		"mostly U.S. military personnel in the stands"
June 1976	1976	21–13	Texas A&I	Lone Star Conference	Henderson State	AIC	Stade Colombes	Paris	France	25,000	
September 24, 1976	1976	42–16	Grambling State	SWAC	Morgan State	MEAC	Korakuen Stadium	Tokyo	Japan	50,000	Was played as the Pioneer Bowl
December 11, 1977	1977	35–32	Grambling State	SWAC	Temple	Independent	Korakuen Stadium	Tokyo	Japan	50,000	Was played as the Mirage Bowl
September 3, 1978	1978	10–0	Utah State	PCAA	Idaho State	RMAC	Hankyu Nishinomiya Stadium	Nishinomiya	Japan	15,000	Was the first college football season-opener played in Japan
December 2, 1978	1978	28–24	BYU	WAC	UNLV	Independent	Yokohama Stadium	Yokohama	Japan	27,500	Was played as the Yokohama Bowl
December 10, 1978	1978	28–24	Temple	Independent	Boston College	Independent	Korakuen Stadium	Tokyo	Japan	55,000	Was played as the Mirage Bowl
November 24, 1979	1979	40–15	Notre Dame	Independent	Miami (FL)	Independent	Korakuen Stadium	Tokyo	Japan	62,574	Was played as the Mirage Bowl
November 30, 1980	1980	34–3	UCLA	Pac-10	Oregon State	Pac-10	National Olympic Stadium	Tokyo	Japan	86,000	Was played as the Mirage Bowl
November 28, 1981	1981	21–16	Air Force	WAC	San Diego State	WAC	National Olympic Stadium	Tokyo	Japan	80,000	Was played as the Mirage Bowl
November 27, 1982	1982	21–17	Clemson	ACC	Wake Forest	ACC	National Olympic Stadium	Tokyo	Japan	64,700	Was played as the Mirage Bowl
November 26, 1983	1983	34–12	SMU	Southwest	Houston	Southwest Conference	National Olympic Stadium	Tokyo	Japan	70,000	Was played as the Mirage Bowl
November 17, 1984	1984	45–31	Army	Independent	Montana	Big Sky	National Olympic Stadium	Tokyo	Japan	60,000	Was played as the Mirage Bowl
November 30, 1985	1985	20–6	USC	Pac-10	Oregon	Pac-10	National Olympic Stadium	Tokyo	Japan	65,000	Was played as the Mirage Bowl
December 6, 1985	1985	24–21	Wyoming	WAC	UTEP	WAC	VFL Park	Melbourne	Australia	19,107	Was played as the Australia Bowl
November 30, 1986	1986	29–24	Stanford	Pac-10	Arizona	Pac-10	National Olympic Stadium	Tokyo	Japan	55,000	Was played as the Coca-Cola Classic
November 28, 1987	1987	17–17	California	Pac-10	Washington State	Pac-10	National Olympic Stadium	Tokyo	Japan	45,000	Was played as the Coca-Cola Classic
December 4, 1987	1987	30–26	BYU	WAC	Colorado State	WAC	Princes Park	Melbourne	Australia	7,652	Was played as the Melbourne Bowl
October 16, 1988	1988	20–17	Richmond	Colonial	Boston University	Yankee	Crystal Palace National Sports Centre	London	United Kingdom	2,500	
November 19, 1988	1988	38–24	Boston College	Independent	Army	Independent	Lansdowne Road	Dublin	Ireland	42,525	Was played as the Emerald Isle Classic and was also the first major college football game played in Europe
December 3, 1988	1988	45–42	Oklahoma State	Big Eight	Texas Tech	Southwest	Tokyo Dome	Tokyo	Japan	56,000	Was played as the Coca-Cola Classic
January 8, 1989	1988	73–3	William & Mary	I-AA independent	Japan All-Stars		Yokohama Stadium	Yokohama	Japan	11,000	Was played as the Ivy Bowl
October 28, 1989	1989	28–25	Villanova	Yankee	Rhode Island	Yankee	Arena Civica	Milan	Italy	5,000	Was played as the Milano Kickoff Classic and was the first college football game played in Italy
December 2, 1989	1989	46–29	Pittsburgh	Independent	Rutgers	Independent	Lansdowne Road	Dublin	Ireland	19,800	Was played as the Emerald Isle Classic
December 4, 1989	1989	24–13	Syracuse	Independent	Louisville	Independent	Tokyo Dome	Tokyo	Japan	50,000	Was played as the Coca-Cola Classic
December 2, 1990	1990	62–45	Houston	Southwest	Arizona State	Pac-10	Tokyo Dome	Tokyo	Japan	50,000	Was played as the Coca-Cola Classic
May 31, 1991	1991	20–7	Pacific Lutheran		Evangel		Workers' Stadium	Beijing	China	25,000	
November 16, 1991	1991	24–19	Holy Cross	Patriot	Fordham	Patriot	Gaelic Grounds	Limerick	Ireland	17,411	Was played as the Wild Geese Classic and was the first non-Gaelic game played at Limerick
November 16, 1991	1991	51–13	Bethune–Cookman	MEAC	Morris Brown	SIAC	Thomas Robinson Stadium	Nassau	Bahamas	12,500	
November 30, 1991	1991	33–21	Clemson	ACC	Duke	ACC	Tokyo Dome	Tokyo	Japan	50,000	Was played as the Coca-Cola Classic
September 19, 1992	1992	7–7	Heidelberg	OAC	Otterbein	OAC	Stadion am Bieberer Berg	Offenbach am Main	Germany	4,351	Was played as the Rhine River Cup, and was the first college football game played in reunified Germany
November 29, 1992	1992	7–6	Bowdoin	NESCAC	Tufts	NESCAC	Pearse Stadium	Galway	Ireland	2,500	Was played as the Christopher Columbus Classic
December 6, 1992	1992	38–24	Nebraska	Big Eight	Kansas State	Big Eight	Tokyo Dome	Tokyo	Japan	50,000	Was played as the Coca-Cola Classic
January 9, 1993	1992	35–19	William & Mary	I-AA independent	Nihon University		Tokyo Dome	Tokyo	Japan	40,000	Was played as the Ivy Bowl
November 20, 1993	1993	17–14	Georgetown	MAAC	Washington and Lee	ODAC	Bermuda National Stadium	Hamilton	Bermuda	3,218	Was played as the Bermuda Bowl
December 5, 1993	1993	41–20	Wisconsin	Big Ten	Michigan State	Big Ten	Tokyo Dome	Tokyo	Japan	51,500	Was played as the Coca-Cola Classic
November 19, 1994	1994	28–14	Davidson	Independent	Sewanee	SCAC	Bermuda National Stadium	Hamilton	Bermuda	2,000	Was played as the Bermuda Bowl
October 28, 1995	1995	17–10	Fordham	Patriot	Holy Cross	Patriot	Bermuda National Stadium	Hamilton	Bermuda	2,436	Was played as the Bermuda Bowl
November 2, 1996	1996	54–27	Notre Dame	Independent	Navy	Independent	Croke Park	Dublin	Ireland	38,651	Was played as the Shamrock Classic
September 30, 2000	2000	42–6	Bethune–Cookman	MEAC	Morgan State	MEAC	Thomas Robinson Stadium	Nassau	Bahamas	4,259	Was played as the Conch Bowl Classic
January 6, 2007	2006	27–24	Cincinnati	Big East	Western Michigan	MAC	Rogers Centre	Toronto	Canada	26,717	Was played as the 2007 International Bowl
January 5, 2008	2007	52–30	Rutgers	Big East	Ball State	MAC	Rogers Centre	Toronto	Canada	31,455	Was played as the 2008 International Bowl
January 3, 2009	2008	38–20	Connecticut	Big East	Buffalo	MAC	Rogers Centre	Toronto	Canada	40,184	Was played as the 2009 International Bowl
January 2, 2010	2009	27–3	South Florida	Big East	Northern Illinois	MAC	Rogers Centre	Toronto	Canada	22,185	Was played as the 2010 International Bowl
May 21, 2011	2010	17–7	Drake	Pioneer	CONADEIP Stars	ONEFA	Sheikh Amri Abeid Memorial Stadium	Arusha	Tanzania	11,781	Was played as the 2011 Kilimanjaro Bowl and was the first time an American football team played in Africa
August 31, 2012	2012	40–3	John Carroll	OAC	St. Norbert	Midwest	Donnybrook Stadium	Dublin	Ireland		
September 1, 2012	2012	50–10	Notre Dame	Independent	Navy	Independent	Aviva Stadium	Dublin	Ireland	48,820	Was played as the Emerald Isle Classic.
September 13, 2014	2014	30–16	Texas Southern	SAC	Central State	SIAC	Thomas Robinson Stadium	Nassau	Bahamas	7,802	Was played as the HBCUX Classic
August 30, 2014	2014	26–24	Penn State	Big Ten	UCF	The American	Croke Park	Dublin	Ireland	55,000	Was played as the Croke Park Classic.
December 24, 2014	2014	49–48	Western Kentucky	C-USA	Central Michigan	MAC	Thomas Robinson Stadium	Nassau	Bahamas	13,667	Was played as the 2014 Bahamas Bowl
March 21, 2015	2015	36–7	Princeton	Ivy	Kwansei Gakuin	KCAFL	KINCHO Stadium	Osaka	Japan	N/A	Was played as the Legacy Bowl, a memorial exhibition game celebrating the 125th anniversary of Kwansei Gakuin University's founding.
December 24, 2015	2015	45–31	Western Michigan	MAC	Middle Tennessee	C-USA	Thomas Robinson Stadium	Nassau	Bahamas	13,123	Was played as the 2015 Bahamas Bowl
August 27, 2016	2016	51–31	California	Pac-12	Hawaiʻi	Mountain West	ANZ Stadium	Sydney	Australia	61,247	Played as the Sydney College Football Cup.
September 3, 2016	2016	17–14	Georgia Tech	ACC	Boston College	ACC	Aviva Stadium	Dublin	Ireland	40,562	Played as the Aer Lingus College Football Classic.
December 23, 2016	2016	24–20	Old Dominion	C-USA	Eastern Michigan	MAC	Thomas Robinson Stadium	Nassau	Bahamas	13,422	Played as the 2016 Bahamas Bowl.
August 26, 2017	2017	62–7	Stanford	Pac-12	Rice	C-USA	Allianz Stadium	Sydney	Australia	33,181	Played as the Sydney College Football Cup
December 22, 2017	2017	41–6	Ohio	MAC	UAB	C-USA	Thomas Robinson Stadium	Nassau	Bahamas	13,585	Played as the 2017 Bahamas Bowl.
December 21, 2018	2018	35–32	FIU	C-USA	Toledo	MAC	Thomas Robinson Stadium	Nassau	Bahamas	13,510	Played as the 2018 Bahamas Bowl.
March 9, 2019	2019	85–0	Penn	Ivy	China All Stars	None	Shanghai Lixin University of Commerce Stadium	Shanghai	China	3,200	Played as Penn-China Global Ambassadors Bowl.
December 20, 2019	2019	31–9	Buffalo	MAC	Charlotte	C-USA	Thomas Robinson Stadium	Nassau	Bahamas	13,547	Played as the 2019 Bahamas Bowl.
December 17, 2021	2021	31–24	Middle Tennessee	C-USA	Toledo	MAC	Thomas Robinson Stadium	Nassau	Bahamas	13,596	Played as the 2021 Bahamas Bowl.
August 27, 2022	2022	31–28	Northwestern	Big Ten	Nebraska	Big Ten	Aviva Stadium	Dublin	Ireland	42,699	Played as the Aer Lingus College Football Classic.
December 16, 2022	2022	24–20	UAB	C-USA	Miami (OH)	MAC	Thomas Robinson Stadium	Nassau	Bahamas	12,172	Played as the 2022 Bahamas Bowl.
August 26, 2023	2023	42–3	Notre Dame	Independent	Navy	The American	Aviva Stadium	Dublin	Ireland	49,000	Played as the Aer Lingus College Football Classic.
August 24, 2024	2024	24–21	Georgia Tech	ACC	Florida State	ACC	Aviva Stadium	Dublin	Ireland	47,998	Played as the Aer Lingus College Football Classic.
January 4, 2025	2024	26–7	Buffalo	MAC	Liberty	CUSA	Thomas Robinson Stadium	Nassau	Bahamas	4,610	Played as the 2025 Bahamas Bowl.
August 23, 2025	2025	24–21	Iowa State	Big 12	Kansas State	Big 12	Aviva Stadium	Dublin	Ireland	47,221	Played as the Aer Lingus College Football Classic.
August 29, 2026	2026	15–10	North Carolina	ACC	TCU	Big 12	Aviva Stadium	Dublin	Ireland	40,457	Played as the Aer Lingus College Football Classic.
September 19, 2026	2026	24–17	Arizona State	Big 12	Kansas	Big 12	Wembley Stadium	London	United Kingdom	46,523	Played as the Union Jack Classic.

== Scheduled games ==
Date	Season	Host		Opponent		Stadium	City	Country	Details
August 28, 2027	2027	Pittsburgh	ACC	Wisconsin	Big Ten	Aviva Stadium	Dublin	Ireland	To be played as the Aer Lingus College Football Classic.

== See also ==
- List of Major League Baseball games played outside the United States and Canada
- List of National Basketball Association games played outside the United States and Canada
- List of National Football League games played outside the United States
- List of National Hockey League games played outside the United States and Canada
