= NFL International Series =

International American football games series

The NFL International Series logo used between 2009 and 2016; the year was updated annually.

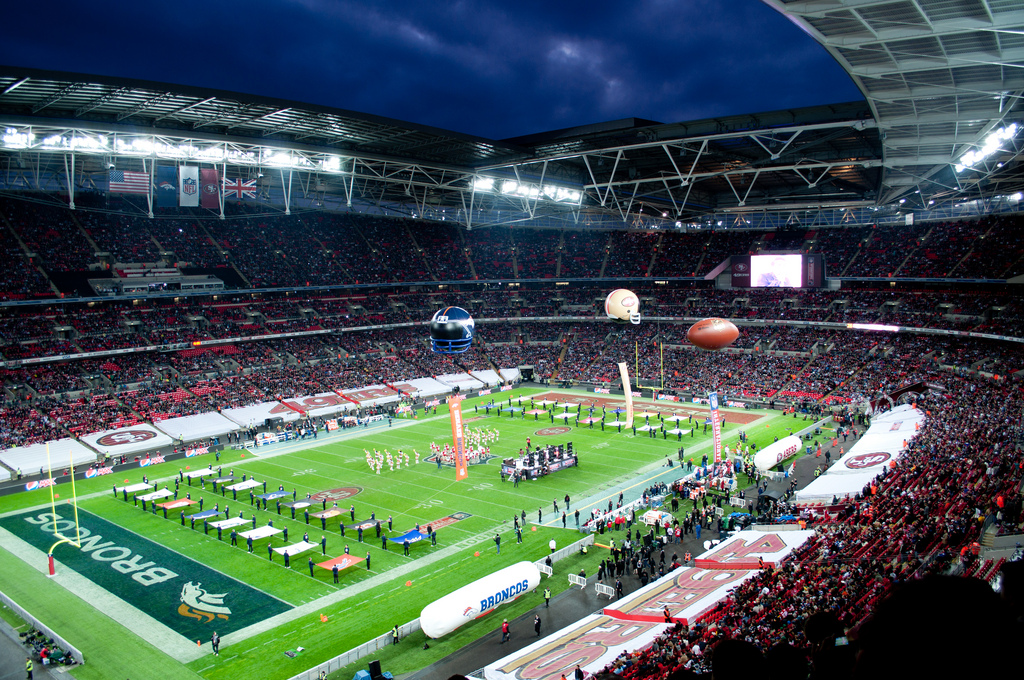
Opening ceremony at Wembley Stadium before the Denver Broncos vs. San Francisco 49ers game in 2010

The NFL International Series is a series of American football games during the National Football League (NFL) regular season that are played outside the United States. The series has held games in the United Kingdom (in place since 2007), Australia, Brazil, Germany, Ireland, Spain, and France. Between 2016 and 2022, the series also intermittently included games played in Mexico, though the league will return in 2026.

Wembley Stadium in London was the exclusive home stadium for International Series games from 2007 to 2015 and continued to host NFL games through 2019 and again since 2022. The series expanded to more stadiums, first to Twickenham Stadium in London and Estadio Azteca in Mexico City in 2016 and eventually to Tottenham Hotspur Stadium in London in 2019. Other sites that have hosted games include three locations in Germany: Allianz Arena in Munich (2022 and 2024), Deutsche Bank Park in Frankfurt (2023), and Olympiastadion in Berlin (2025); Arena Corinthians in São Paulo, Brazil (2024 and 2025), the Bernabéu in Madrid, Spain (2025), and Croke Park in Dublin, Ireland (2025). Maracanã Stadium in Rio de Janeiro, Brazil, is set to host three games over the next five years, beginning in 2026. Melbourne Cricket Ground in Melbourne, Australia, and Stade de France in Paris, France, will also host games in 2026.

== Background ==
Before 2005, the primary method used by the National Football League (NFL) of promoting its game abroad was through the American Bowl, a series of preseason games played around the world, and NFL Europe, a developmental league based in Europe. The American Bowls ended in 2005 (though a similar China Bowl was planned for 2007 before being canceled), while NFL Europa (as it was known for its final season) folded in 2007. On October 2, 2005, the Arizona Cardinals defeated the San Francisco 49ers by a score of 31–14 at Estadio Azteca in Mexico City, Mexico, under the name "Fútbol Americano". It was the first regular season NFL game held outside the United States. The game drew the NFL's highest game attendance at the time with 103,467 spectators.

NFL commissioner Roger Goodell considered expanding the league's appeal overseas ever since the end of NFL Europe. Goodell discussed the idea of holding a future Super Bowl game in London. The collective bargaining agreement (CBA) enacted in 2021 expanded the regular season to 17 games with one bye week and introduced at least four neutral site games each year from 2022. The American Football Conference (AFC) and the National Football Conference (NFC) will alternate seasons where they host nine regular season games and one preseason game, or eight regular season games and two preseason games. The host teams for the international games will be selected from the conference with the ninth home game, so clubs will still host eight games in their home stadium. For example, since AFC teams have nine regular season home games in 2025, seven AFC teams were selected to host an international game during the season.

The Buffalo Bills received a unanimous vote of approval to play a series of preseason and regular season games at Rogers Centre in Toronto from 2008 to 2017. This was separate from the regular International Series as arrangements were made by the Bills as opposed to the league. The Bills' Toronto Series was mutually terminated after the 2013 contest.

NFL rules require the designated home team for each international game to have its home stadium available for use in the event that a game cannot be played at the international site.

== History ==
=== Early years (2007–2012) ===
The Miami Dolphins hosted the New York Giants in the first International Series game at Wembley Stadium in London, England, on October 28, 2007. The Giants defeated the Dolphins 13–10 in the first regular season NFL game held outside North America. The first 40,000 tickets sold out for the game in the first 90 minutes of sales. The game was aired regionally on Fox.

A single game was held in London each year through 2012. Like the 2007 game, each was televised nationally in the United Kingdom, but only regionally in the United States. The Tampa Bay Buccaneers' game against the Chicago Bears at Wembley in 2011 suffered from reduced ticket sales compared to previous years, with an attendance of just under 77,000 compared to around 84,000 the previous two years; this was blamed on the 2011 NFL lockout, which resulted in tickets going on sale much later than in previous years. On October 11, 2011, the NFL owners approved playing NFL games in the United Kingdom through 2016. This stated that a home team could visit every year for up to five years but visitors could only visit once every five years; however, the Detroit Lions returned to London as visitors in 2015 in an apparent disregard for this rule.

=== Multi-year deals and multi-game years (2013–2015) ===
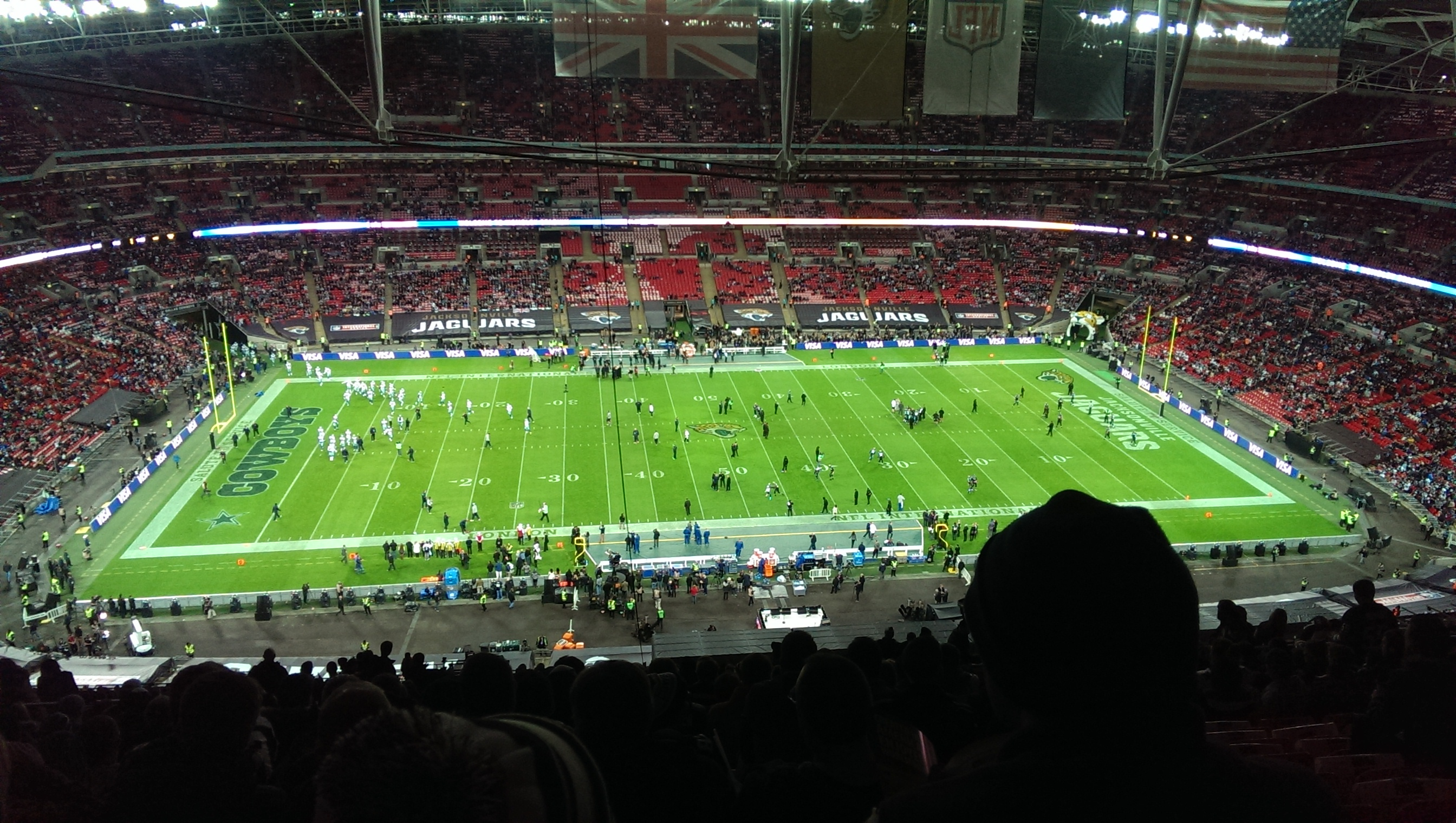
NFL International Series game between Dallas Cowboys and Jacksonville Jaguars in London

On January 20, 2012, NFL commissioner Roger Goodell confirmed that from 2012 to 2014, the St. Louis Rams would play one of their eight home games each year at Wembley Stadium. However, on August 13, 2012, the team announced that it would not play the proposed games in London in 2013 and 2014, only the 2012 game against the New England Patriots that had already been scheduled. Goodell had previously proposed the use of certain regular teams in the International Series in an effort to build a fan base for those teams, raising the prospect of a permanent NFL team on the British Isles.

An NFL bid to become anchor tenants of London's Olympic Stadium failed.

The Jacksonville Jaguars took the Rams' place and agreed to play a home game in London for four seasons from 2013 through 2016. With this announcement also came news that the NFL was working to schedule a second UK game from 2013 onwards (the Jaguars later extended their agreement with Wembley Stadium through 2020 in an agreement announced in October 2015). In October 2012, it was announced that the Jaguars would host the San Francisco 49ers and the Minnesota Vikings would host the Pittsburgh Steelers, marking the first season with multiple games in London.

The NFL played three international games for the 2014 season, including one game with an earlier 9:30 am ET (2:30 pm UK time) start, which allowed for an afternoon game, rather than an evening game, in London. This timeslot proved to be successful as all London games in 2015 and 2016 were also scheduled at 9:30 am ET. Three games were again scheduled in 2015 – including the series' first division game between the New York Jets and the Miami Dolphins.

=== Long-term deals and new stadiums (2016–2021) ===
On July 8, 2015, the NFL and Tottenham Hotspur F.C. announced they had reached a 10-year deal to host at least two London Games a year at the new Tottenham Hotspur Stadium from its opening year in 2019. Additionally, on October 7, 2015, the league announced that a resolution had been passed to schedule international games at additional locations to London until 2025. Subsequently, on October 22, 2015, it was confirmed that at least two games per season would remain at Wembley through at least 2020 and that the Jacksonville Jaguars will continue to play a home game there annually throughout the agreement. Another stadium deal was confirmed on November 3, 2015, when the league announced it had reached an agreement with England's Rugby Football Union to host regular season games at Twickenham Stadium from 2016 onwards, with a minimum of three, and as many as five, games to be held over the initial agreement period of three years.

In 2016, the Oakland Raiders hosted the Houston Texans on November 21 at Estadio Azteca in Mexico City, at the first International Series game played in Mexico. Previously, the Houston Texans and Pittsburgh Steelers had expressed interest in playing a game at Estadio Azteca (or possibly Estadio Olímpico Universitario) in Mexico City, although Houston was not prepared to give up a home date. It was televised as part of ESPN's Monday Night Football, marking the first MNF game broadcast from outside the United States, and ESPN's second broadcast from Mexico City since the 2005 Fútbol Americano game (which was televised as part of ESPN's former incarnation of Sunday Night Football).

The 2016 game between the Washington Redskins and Cincinnati Bengals was the first International Series game to go into overtime, the first to end as a tie, and had at the time the highest attendance of all International Series games (later surpassed by the 2017 game between the Baltimore Ravens and Jacksonville Jaguars, which drew an attendance of 84,592).

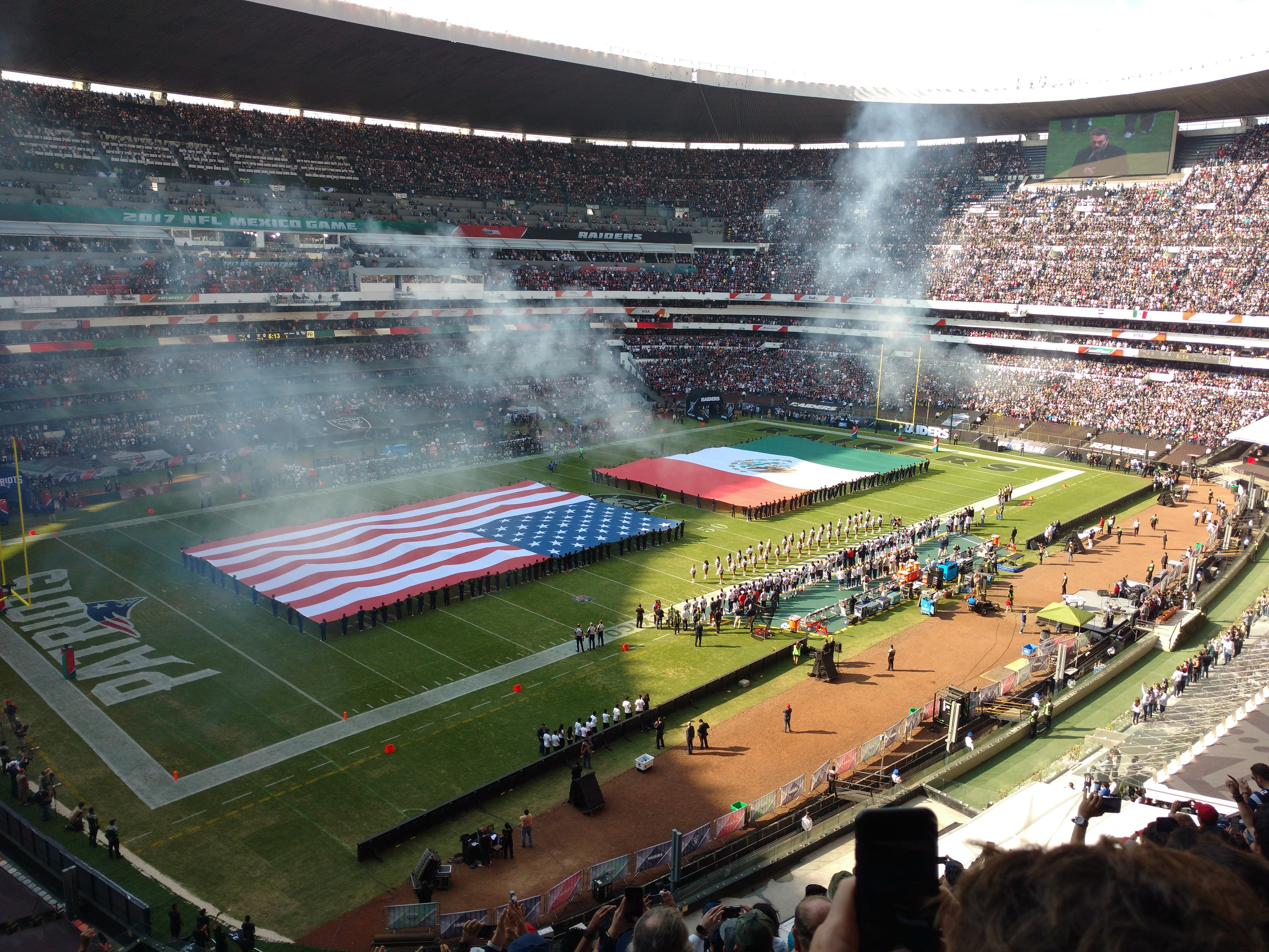
NFL game held in Mexico, at the Estadio Azteca, in 2017.

For 2017, the series scheduled four games in London and one game in Mexico City.

In January 2018, it was announced that three games would be played in London that year, with two at Wembley and the other the first game at Tottenham Hotspur's new stadium. However, it was later confirmed that the opening of Tottenham Hotspur Stadium would be delayed and therefore all three games would be held at Wembley. Having already fulfilled the minimum three-game requirement for Twickenham Stadium in 2017, the league would no longer host games there. The Mexico City date and opponents were not announced at that time, but were later confirmed as the Los Angeles Rams playing as designated home team against the Kansas City Chiefs. The game was subsequently moved to the Rams' then-home stadium, Los Angeles Memorial Coliseum, due to player safety concerns regarding the poor field conditions at Estadio Azteca. The ensuing game would also attract notoriety as the third-highest scoring game in NFL history, and the highest-scoring game in Monday Night Football history.

In October 2018, the league confirmed four London Games would take place in 2019. Wembley Stadium would host two and Tottenham Hotspur Stadium would host the remaining two. The Jacksonville Jaguars would return to Wembley Stadium for the seventh consecutive year in line with their annual commitment. The final schedule was announced in April 2019 alongside that of the rest of the regular season. This marked the end of the Los Angeles Chargers', Los Angeles Rams', and Oakland Raiders' annual commitments, with all three moving to new stadiums in 2020.

In November 2019, the Atlanta Falcons and Miami Dolphins were announced as home teams for 2020 games in either London or Mexico City.

On February 4, 2020, it was announced that the Jaguars would play two home games at Wembley Stadium on consecutive weekends in 2020, the first time a team had done so. 2020 would also have been the final year of games at Wembley Stadium and the final year of the Jaguars' agreement to host annual home games there. On February 28, 2020, it was announced that the Arizona Cardinals would host a game in Mexico City. Their hosting was due to the awarding of Super Bowl LVII to State Farm Stadium in 2018. The Cardinals would have returned to Estadio Azteca for the first time since 2005's Fútbol Americano game. The date and opponent were not announced at the time. On May 4, 2020, the league announced that all international games for 2020 had been moved back to the designated home teams' home stadiums due to the COVID-19 pandemic.

On April 1, 2021, the Atlanta Falcons announced their intention to play a home game at Tottenham Hotspur Stadium in October 2021. On May 11, it was reported that the Falcons and Jaguars would each host a game at Tottenham Hotspur Stadium. This was confirmed the following day. This would mark the Jaguars' eighth home game in London but their first at Tottenham.

=== International marketing and expansion (2022–present) ===
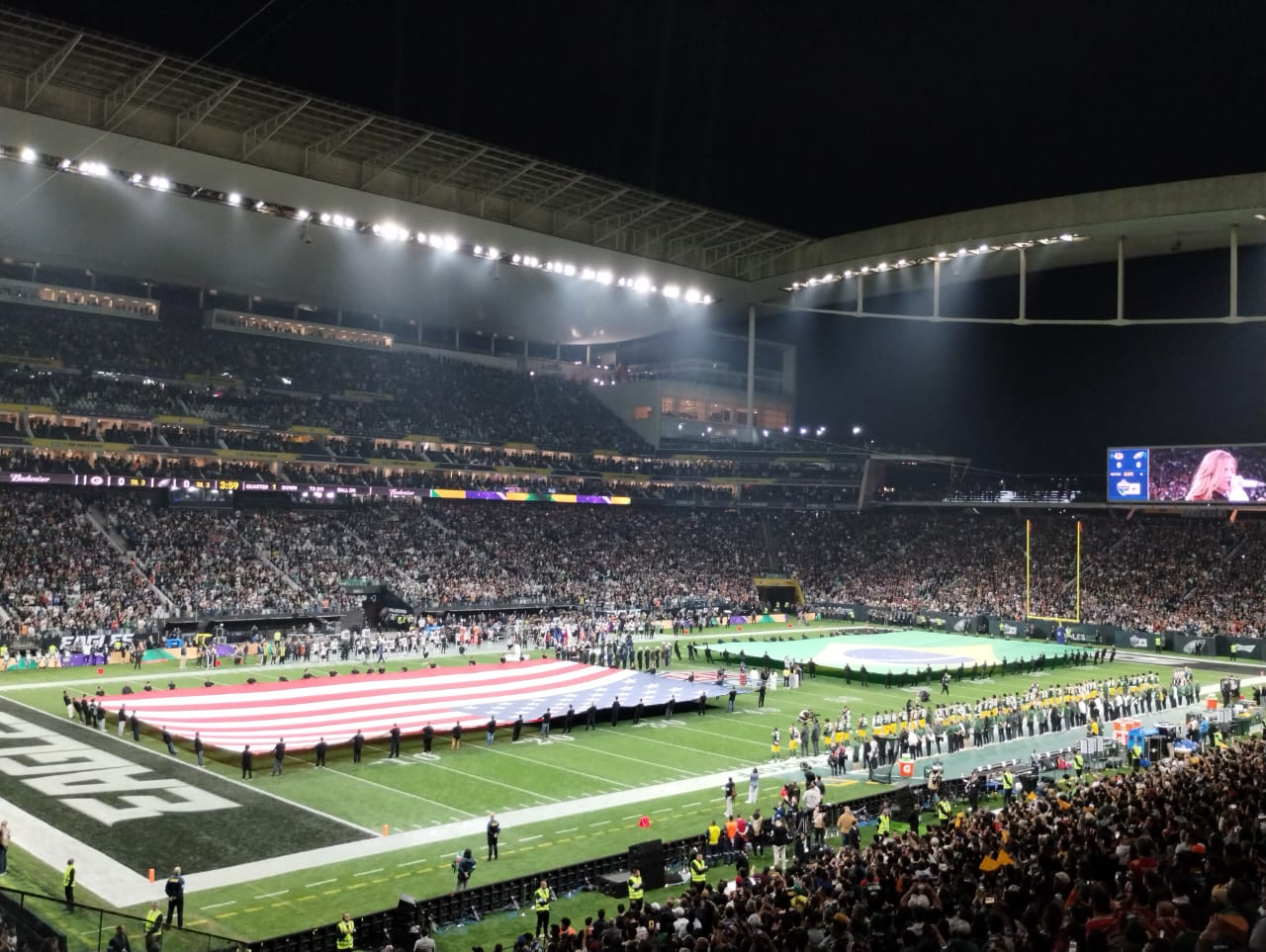
Photo of the opening ceremony of the game between the Green Bay Packers and the Philadelphia Eagles, on September 6, 2024, at Neo Química Arena in Sāo Paulo, Brazil.

In December 2021 the NFL announced the International Home Marketing Areas (HMA) initiative, under which teams can submit proposals to be granted marketing rights for specific foreign countries for a period of five years. This allows them to engage in activities typically restricted to their domestic HMA such as hosting in-person events, selling sponsorships and merchandise, as well as having a high priority to be assigned to play in the International Series games scheduled for their International HMAs.

Initially 18 teams were granted marketing rights across eight countries, starting in January 2022. In May 2022, two more countries were added to the list of international HMA. In 2023, the league added Austria, Switzerland, France, and Ireland. In 2024, the league expanded the program to Argentina, Colombia, Japan, Nigeria, and South Korea. In 2025, the league expanded the program to Greece and the United Arab Emirates. In 2026, the league expanded the program to Italy.

As of March 2026, all 32 teams have been granted rights across 22 International HMA, as listed below.

Country	Team
Argentina	Miami Dolphins
Australia	Las Vegas Raiders
Australia	Los Angeles Rams
Australia	Philadelphia Eagles
Australia	Seattle Seahawks
Austria	Detroit Lions
Austria	Indianapolis Colts
Austria	Kansas City Chiefs
Austria	New England Patriots
Austria	Seattle Seahawks
Austria	Tampa Bay Buccaneers
Brazil	Detroit Lions
Brazil	Miami Dolphins
Brazil	New England Patriots
Brazil	Philadelphia Eagles
Canada (Note: NFL teams are entitled to a domestic Home Marketing Area of radius 75-mile, which for some teams located near the Canada–United States border (e.g. the Buffalo Bills and Detroit Lions) contains parts of Canada. While they do not need to be granted an International Home Marketing Area to continue marketing within this region, they can request one to extend their rights to the rest of the country.)	Arizona Cardinals
Canada	Buffalo Bills
Canada	Cincinnati Bengals
Canada	Detroit Lions
Canada	Minnesota Vikings
Canada	Las Vegas Raiders
Canada	Seattle Seahawks
China	Los Angeles Rams
Colombia	Miami Dolphins
France	New Orleans Saints
Germany	Atlanta Falcons
Germany	Carolina Panthers
Germany	Detroit Lions
Germany	Green Bay Packers
Germany	Indianapolis Colts
Germany	Kansas City Chiefs
Germany	New England Patriots
Germany	New York Giants
Germany	Pittsburgh Steelers
Germany	Seattle Seahawks
Germany	Tampa Bay Buccaneers
Ghana	Philadelphia Eagles
Greece	Los Angeles Chargers
Ireland	Green Bay Packers
Ireland	Jacksonville Jaguars
Ireland	Kansas City Chiefs
Ireland	New York Jets
Ireland	Pittsburgh Steelers
Ireland	Tennessee Titans
Italy	Cleveland Browns
Italy	New Orleans Saints
Japan	Los Angeles Rams
Mexico	Arizona Cardinals
Mexico	Dallas Cowboys
Mexico	Denver Broncos
Mexico	Houston Texans
Mexico	Kansas City Chiefs
Mexico	Las Vegas Raiders
Mexico	Los Angeles Rams
Mexico	Miami Dolphins
Mexico	Pittsburgh Steelers
Mexico	San Francisco 49ers
New Zealand	Las Vegas Raiders
New Zealand	Los Angeles Rams
New Zealand	Philadelphia Eagles
New Zealand	Seattle Seahawks
Nigeria	Cleveland Browns
South Korea	Los Angeles Rams
Spain	Chicago Bears
Spain	Kansas City Chiefs
Spain	Miami Dolphins
Switzerland	Detroit Lions
Switzerland	Indianapolis Colts
Switzerland	Kansas City Chiefs
Switzerland	New England Patriots
Switzerland	Seattle Seahawks
Switzerland	Tampa Bay Buccaneers
United Arab Emirates	Las Vegas Raiders
United Arab Emirates	Los Angeles Rams
United Arab Emirates	San Francisco 49ers
United Arab Emirates	Washington Commanders
United Kingdom	Baltimore Ravens
United Kingdom	Chicago Bears
United Kingdom	Green Bay Packers
United Kingdom	Jacksonville Jaguars
United Kingdom	Kansas City Chiefs
United Kingdom	Las Vegas Raiders
United Kingdom	Miami Dolphins
United Kingdom	Minnesota Vikings
United Kingdom	New York Jets
United Kingdom	Pittsburgh Steelers (Northern Ireland only)
United Kingdom	San Francisco 49ers

On February 9, 2022, the NFL confirmed the addition of the Germany Games to the International Series slate, initially with one game each year from 2022 to 2025. Mark Waller had previously stated in 2017 that the only holdup with games in Germany was what he dubbed "an inventory management thing," in that with four games already being played in London each year, adding additional games in Germany atop those four would pose logistical problems. The league began gauging interest from German cities regarding potential games in June 2021; the league viewed Germany as an ideal candidate for expansion of the International Series because of the country's high viewership for NFL games (2.2 million people in Germany watched Super Bowl LV) and the country's numerous modern stadiums. In October 2021, it was confirmed that Düsseldorf, Frankfurt, and Munich had been invited to participate in deeper conversations about hosting NFL games.

In March 2022, the Jaguars confirmed they had reached an agreement with Wembley Stadium to host an annual game through 2024. In the following season, the Jaguars became the first team to play two games in London in one season. On October 1, they hosted the Atlanta Falcons at Wembley Stadium and then the following week on October 8 as the designated visiting team against the Buffalo Bills at Tottenham Hotspur Stadium; they won both games.

In November 2023, the NFL said it would again have five international games for the 2024 season. Three would be in London (one of those the Jaguars' regular home game in Wembley), one would be in Munich, and the last one would be in a new market, either Madrid, Spain, or São Paulo, Brazil. The league would not expand the number of international games beyond the five it already had (the four rotational home teams and the Jaguars) until the 2025 season at the earliest. In December 2023, with the announcement of São Paulo as the third venue of the 2024 international slate, it was confirmed that the league planned to host eight international games in 2025. The first new venue for 2025 was announced as Real Madrid's Bernabéu in Madrid. Tickets for the São Paulo, Brazil, game went on sale beginning on June 10, 2024, and the high demand for them surprised the broker Ticketmaster. Of the approximately 150,000 people who queued online, only about 10% received a ticket.

In December 2024, the NFL announced that the Olympiastadion in Berlin, Germany, will also host a game in 2025. The Indianapolis Colts were named as the designated home team for the Berlin game on January 15, 2025. Two days later, the Miami Dolphins were revealed as the designated home team for the inaugural Madrid Game at the Bernabéu.

On February 5, 2025, the NFL announced that the first regular season game in Australia would be played in 2026, as the Los Angeles Rams were named the designated home team to play at the Melbourne Cricket Ground in Melbourne, Australia. The league's first regular season game in Ireland was announced a few days later, with the Pittsburgh Steelers named the designated home team for the 2025 game at Croke Park in Dublin. On February 19, 2025, the NFL announced it would return to Brazil for another game at Arena Corinthians in São Paulo for Week 1 of the 2025 season, with the Los Angeles Chargers named the designated home team.

In September 2025, the NFL announced that the 2026 Brazil game would be played at Maracanã Stadium in Rio de Janeiro. The league then announced in December 2025 that games in Germany would continue through 2029, with Munich hosting in 2026 and 2028, and Berlin hosting in 2027 and 2029.

In January 2026, New England Patriots owner Robert Kraft theorized that the NFL would expand to an 18-game regular season and have every NFL team play in the NFL International Series at least once per season.

In February 2026, the NFL announced that the first regular season game in France would be played later that year, as the New Orleans Saints were named as one of the participants to play at Stade de France in Paris, France. The game, against the Pittsburgh Steelers, was played on October 25, 2026, as France deals with civil unrest over education and the cost of living. While there is concern over the safety of players and fans alike, the NFL indicated it intended to carry on as planned, working with authorities to heighten security.

The NFL also confirmed a multi-year deal to play games in Madrid, as well as a multi-year return to Mexico City following the completion of renovations at Estadio Banorte.

In May 2026, the NFL eliminated a team's ability to prevent games against specific opponents from being played in the NFL International Series, allowing the league to move any matchup internationally. Prior to then, teams could protect two home games per season. The NFL also announced that the NFL International Series would expand to up to 10 games in 2027.

== Results ==
=== Australia ===
Year	Date	Designated visiting team		Designated home team		Stadium	City	Attendance
2026	September 11 (Note: September 10 in U.S. time zones)	San Francisco 49ers	27	Los Angeles Rams	7	Melbourne Cricket Ground	Melbourne	100,021

=== Brazil ===
Year	Date	Designated visiting team		Designated home team		Stadium	City	Attendance
2024	September 6	Green Bay Packers	29	Philadelphia Eagles	34	Arena Corinthians	São Paulo	47,236
2025	September 5	Kansas City Chiefs	21	Los Angeles Chargers	27	Arena Corinthians	São Paulo	47,627
2026	September 27	Baltimore Ravens	34	Dallas Cowboys	31	Maracanã Stadium	Rio de Janeiro	72,792

=== France ===
Year	Date	Designated visiting team		Designated home team		Stadium	City	Attendance
2026	October 25	Pittsburgh Steelers	16	New Orleans Saints	10	Stade de France	Paris	78,488

=== Germany ===
Year	Date	Designated visiting team		Designated home team		Stadium	City	Attendance
2022	November 13	Seattle Seahawks	16	Tampa Bay Buccaneers	21	Allianz Arena	Munich	69,811
2023	November 5	Miami Dolphins	14	Kansas City Chiefs	21	Deutsche Bank Park	Frankfurt	50,023
2023	November 12	Indianapolis Colts	10	New England Patriots	6	Deutsche Bank Park	Frankfurt	50,144
2024	November 10	New York Giants	17	Carolina Panthers	20^{OT}	Allianz Arena	Munich	70,132
2025	November 9	Atlanta Falcons	25	Indianapolis Colts	31^{OT}	Olympiastadion	Berlin	72,207
2026	November 15	New England Patriots	10	Detroit Lions	35	Allianz Arena	Munich	70,225
2027	TBA	TBA		TBA		Olympiastadion	Berlin	
2028	TBA	TBA		TBA		Allianz Arena	Munich	
2029	TBA	TBA		TBA		Olympiastadion	Berlin	

=== Ireland ===
Year	Date	Designated visiting team		Designated home team		Stadium	City	Attendance
2025	September 28	Minnesota Vikings	21	Pittsburgh Steelers	24	Croke Park	Dublin	74,512

=== Mexico ===
Year	Date	Designated visiting team		Designated home team		Stadium	City	Attendance
2016	November 21	Houston Texans	20	Oakland Raiders	27	Estadio Azteca	Mexico City	76,473
2017	November 19	New England Patriots	33	Oakland Raiders	8	Estadio Azteca	Mexico City	77,357
2018	November 19 (relocated) (Note: The November 19, 2018, game was scheduled to be played between the Kansas City Chiefs and the Los Angeles Rams at Mexico City's Estadio Azteca, but poor field conditions forced the league to move the game to the Rams' home stadium, the Los Angeles Memorial Coliseum. The Rams won the game 54–51.)	Kansas City Chiefs	—	Los Angeles Rams	—	Estadio Azteca	Mexico City	
2019	November 18	Kansas City Chiefs	24	Los Angeles Chargers	17	Estadio Azteca	Mexico City	76,252
2022	November 21	San Francisco 49ers	38	Arizona Cardinals	10	Estadio Azteca	Mexico City	78,427
2026	November 22	Minnesota Vikings		San Francisco 49ers		Estadio Azteca	Mexico City	
2027	TBA	TBA		TBA		Estadio Azteca	Mexico City	
2028	TBA	TBA		TBA		Estadio Azteca	Mexico City	

=== Spain ===
Year	Date	Designated visiting team		Designated home team		Stadium	City	Attendance
2025	November 16	Washington Commanders	13	Miami Dolphins	16^{OT}	Bernabéu	Madrid	78,610
2026	November 8	Cincinnati Bengals	34	Atlanta Falcons	17	Bernabéu	Madrid	78,660

=== United Kingdom ===
Year	Date	Designated visiting team		Designated home team		Stadium	City	Attendance
2007	October 28	New York Giants	13	Miami Dolphins	10	Wembley Stadium	London	81,176
2008	October 26	San Diego Chargers	32	New Orleans Saints	37	Wembley Stadium	London	83,226
2009	October 25	New England Patriots	35	Tampa Bay Buccaneers	7	Wembley Stadium	London	84,254
2010	October 31	Denver Broncos	16	San Francisco 49ers	24	Wembley Stadium	London	83,941
2011	October 23	Chicago Bears	24	Tampa Bay Buccaneers	18	Wembley Stadium	London	76,981
2012	October 28	New England Patriots	45	St. Louis Rams	7	Wembley Stadium	London	84,004
2013	September 29	Pittsburgh Steelers	27	Minnesota Vikings	34	Wembley Stadium	London	83,518
2013	October 27	San Francisco 49ers	42	Jacksonville Jaguars	10	Wembley Stadium	London	83,559
2014	September 28	Miami Dolphins	38	Oakland Raiders	14	Wembley Stadium	London	83,436
2014	October 26	Detroit Lions	22	Atlanta Falcons	21	Wembley Stadium	London	83,532
2014	November 9	Dallas Cowboys	31	Jacksonville Jaguars	17	Wembley Stadium	London	83,603
2015	October 4	New York Jets	27	Miami Dolphins	14	Wembley Stadium	London	83,986
2015	October 25	Buffalo Bills	31	Jacksonville Jaguars	34	Wembley Stadium	London	84,021
2015	November 1	Detroit Lions	10	Kansas City Chiefs	45	Wembley Stadium	London	83,624
2016	October 2	Indianapolis Colts	27	Jacksonville Jaguars	30	Wembley Stadium	London	83,798
2016	October 23	New York Giants	17	Los Angeles Rams	10	Twickenham Stadium	London	74,121
2016	October 30	Washington Redskins	27^{OT}	Cincinnati Bengals	27^{OT}	Wembley Stadium	London	84,448
2017	September 24	Baltimore Ravens	7	Jacksonville Jaguars	44	Wembley Stadium	London	84,592
2017	October 1	New Orleans Saints	20	Miami Dolphins	0	Wembley Stadium	London	84,423
2017	October 22	Arizona Cardinals	0	Los Angeles Rams	33	Twickenham Stadium	London	73,736
2017	October 29	Minnesota Vikings	33	Cleveland Browns	16	Twickenham Stadium	London	74,237
2018	October 14	Seattle Seahawks	27	Oakland Raiders	3	Wembley Stadium	London	84,922
2018	October 21	Tennessee Titans	19	Los Angeles Chargers	20	Wembley Stadium	London	84,301
2018	October 28	Philadelphia Eagles	24	Jacksonville Jaguars	18	Wembley Stadium	London	85,870
2019	October 6	Chicago Bears	21	Oakland Raiders	24	Tottenham Hotspur Stadium	London	60,463
2019	October 13	Carolina Panthers	37	Tampa Bay Buccaneers	26	Tottenham Hotspur Stadium	London	60,087
2019	October 27	Cincinnati Bengals	10	Los Angeles Rams	24	Wembley Stadium	London	83,720
2019	November 3	Houston Texans	26	Jacksonville Jaguars	3	Wembley Stadium	London	84,771
2021	October 10	New York Jets	20	Atlanta Falcons	27	Tottenham Hotspur Stadium	London	60,589
2021	October 17	Miami Dolphins	20	Jacksonville Jaguars	23	Tottenham Hotspur Stadium	London	60,784
2022	October 2	Minnesota Vikings	28	New Orleans Saints	25	Tottenham Hotspur Stadium	London	60,639
2022	October 9	New York Giants	27	Green Bay Packers	22	Tottenham Hotspur Stadium	London	61,024
2022	October 30	Denver Broncos	21	Jacksonville Jaguars	17	Wembley Stadium	London	86,215
2023	October 1	Atlanta Falcons	7	Jacksonville Jaguars	23	Wembley Stadium	London	85,716
2023	October 8	Jacksonville Jaguars	25	Buffalo Bills	20	Tottenham Hotspur Stadium	London	61,273
2023	October 15	Baltimore Ravens	24	Tennessee Titans	16	Tottenham Hotspur Stadium	London	61,011
2024	October 6	New York Jets	17	Minnesota Vikings	23	Tottenham Hotspur Stadium	London	61,139
2024	October 13	Jacksonville Jaguars	16	Chicago Bears	35	Tottenham Hotspur Stadium	London	61,182
2024	October 20	New England Patriots	16	Jacksonville Jaguars	32	Wembley Stadium	London	86,651
2025	October 5	Minnesota Vikings	21	Cleveland Browns	17	Tottenham Hotspur Stadium	London	61,082
2025	October 12	Denver Broncos	13	New York Jets	11	Tottenham Hotspur Stadium	London	61,155
2025	October 19	Los Angeles Rams	35	Jacksonville Jaguars	7	Wembley Stadium	London	86,152
2026	October 4	Indianapolis Colts	30	Washington Commanders	13	Tottenham Hotspur Stadium	London	60,907
2026	October 11	Philadelphia Eagles	17	Jacksonville Jaguars	19	Tottenham Hotspur Stadium	London	61,322
2026	October 18	Houston Texans	34	Jacksonville Jaguars	31	Wembley Stadium	London	82,497
2027	TBA	TBA		TBA		Tottenham Hotspur Stadium	London	
2027	TBA	TBA		TBA		Tottenham Hotspur Stadium	London	
2027	TBA	TBA		Jacksonville Jaguars		Wembley Stadium	London	
2028	TBA	TBA		TBA		Tottenham Hotspur Stadium	London	
2028	TBA	TBA		TBA		Tottenham Hotspur Stadium	London	
2029	TBA	TBA		TBA		Tottenham Hotspur Stadium	London	
2029	TBA	TBA		TBA		Tottenham Hotspur Stadium	London	

=== Stadiums ===
Stadium	Location	Games hosted	Years hosted
Wembley Stadium	London, United Kingdom	28	2007, 2008, 2009, 2010, 2011, 2012, 2013 (2), 2014 (3), 2015 (3), 2016 (2), 2017 (2), 2018 (3), 2019 (2), 2022, 2023, 2024, 2025, 2026
Tottenham Hotspur Stadium	London, United Kingdom	14	2019 (2), 2021 (2), 2022 (2), 2023 (2), 2024 (2), 2025 (2), 2026 (2)
Twickenham Stadium	London, United Kingdom	3	2016, 2017 (2)
Estadio Azteca	Mexico City, Mexico	5	2005, 2016, 2017, 2019, 2022
Allianz Arena	Munich, Germany	3	2022, 2024, 2026
Deutsche Bank Park	Frankfurt, Germany	2	2023 (2)
Arena Corinthians	São Paulo, Brazil	2	2024, 2025
Bernabéu	Madrid, Spain	2	2025, 2026
Maracanã Stadium	Rio de Janeiro, Brazil	1	2026
Croke Park	(Republic of Ireland) Dublin, Ireland	1	2025
Olympiastadion	Berlin, Germany	1	2025
Melbourne Cricket Ground	Melbourne, Australia	1	2026
Stade de France	Paris, France	1	2026

=== Team records ===
Team	Games	W–L–T	Pct	Most recent
Arizona Cardinals	2	0–2–0	.000	2022
Atlanta Falcons	5	1–4–0	.200	2026
Baltimore Ravens	3	2–1–0	.667	2026
Buffalo Bills	2	0–2–0	.000	2023
Carolina Panthers	2	2–0–0	1.000	2024
Chicago Bears	3	2–1–0	.667	2024
Cincinnati Bengals	3	1–1–1	.500	2026
Cleveland Browns	2	0–2–0	.000	2025
Dallas Cowboys	2	1–1–0	.500	2026
Denver Broncos	3	2–1–0	.667	2025
Detroit Lions	2	1–1–0	.500	2015
Green Bay Packers	2	0–2–0	.000	2024
Houston Texans	3	2–1–0	.667	2026
Indianapolis Colts	3	2–1–0	.667	2026
Jacksonville Jaguars	16	8–8–0	.500	2026
Kansas City Chiefs	4	3–1–0	.750	2025
Los Angeles / San Diego Chargers	4	2–2–0	.500	2025
Los Angeles / St. Louis Rams	6	3–3–0	.500	2026
Miami Dolphins	7	2–5–0	.286	2025
Minnesota Vikings	6	5–1–0	.833	2025
New England Patriots	5	3–2–0	.600	2024
New Orleans Saints	4	2–2–0	.500	2026
New York Giants	4	3–1–0	.750	2024
New York Jets	4	1–3–0	.250	2025
Oakland Raiders (Note: Team is currently known as the Las Vegas Raiders, but has only played internationally under the “Oakland Raiders” name)	5	2–3–0	.400	2019
Philadelphia Eagles	3	2–1–0	.667	2026
Pittsburgh Steelers	3	2–1–0	.667	2026
San Francisco 49ers	4	4–0–0	1.000	2026
Seattle Seahawks	2	1–1–0	.500	2022
Tampa Bay Buccaneers	4	1–3–0	.250	2022
Tennessee Titans	2	0–2–0	.000	2023
Washington Redskins / Commanders	2	0–1–1	.250	2026

== Future ==
=== Future markets ===
Within the United Kingdom, aside from London, candidates previously considered for hosting NFL games included the Millennium Stadium in Cardiff, Wales; and Murrayfield Stadium in Edinburgh, Scotland. Other prime locations considered to host NFL games included China, Japan, and Canada (Canada hosted the Bills Toronto Series from 2008 to 2013 and a preseason game between the Green Bay Packers and the Oakland Raiders at IG Field in Winnipeg, Manitoba, in 2019). In 2007, NFL Senior Vice President Mark Waller doubted Asia or Australia would be targeted because of travel concerns, but did not dismiss the possibility (Australia would eventually receive a game in 2026). The league had planned to host a game in China in 2018 with the Los Angeles Rams as the home team against the San Francisco 49ers. The potential game in China was postponed (the third time the league postponed playing in China, following failed attempts in 2007 and 2009) to the 2019 season to coincide with the league's 100th anniversary; but ultimately was not included on the 2019 schedule. The league has indicated a China game is still not certain because of the lack of a fan base in the country; NFL games are played in the middle of the night in China. Other potential problems include whether the stadiums in China are suitable to play an NFL game, and Beijing's notoriously poor air quality. The topic of a 2020 preseason game in China was discussed at the 2019 owners' meetings, but no news came out of those meetings. In September 2026, the NFL said they were considering the idea of a regular season game in Tokyo.

=== Potential London team ===
The success of the International Series has led the NFL to focus its global expansion aims on the possibility of having a full franchise located in London. It is believed this would be most likely achieved through relocation of an existing franchise, with the Jaguars most often linked due to their association with the International Series, even though their owner is said to be content with the current arrangement and other franchises have more reason to move (the most often cited being poor on-field performance, lack of fans and uncertainty over stadium leases). The NFL has used some of the specific arrangements for the International Series games as a test bed for predicting how a London franchise could be made effective from a logistical and competitiveness standpoint.

The Jacksonville Jaguars have significant ties to London. They have played more games in the city than any other NFL team, with a total of 12 games between 2013 and 2024.

There have been recurring rumors about the team potentially relocating to London; however, these have been questioned as the team plans to begin a $1.4 billion renovation of EverBank Stadium after the conclusion of the 2025 season. The team is planning to play its entire home schedule away from Jacksonville in 2027 ahead of the project's scheduled completion in 2028.

In 2023, NFL Commissioner Roger Goodell expressed interest in having one or two NFL teams based in the United Kingdom. During a press conference in 2024, he mentioned the possibility of scheduling regular games in London while the Jaguars' stadium is being renovated. This initiative would allow the NFL to evaluate the financial viability of a permanent team in London.

Jaguars owner Shahid Khan also owns Premier League club Fulham F.C., which plays in West London. In 2018, Khan dropped his bid to buy Wembley Stadium for nearly $800 million.

== Broadcasting ==
=== United States ===
From 2007 to 2014, every NFL International Series game was televised by either CBS or Fox through their existing broadcast agreements with the NFL.

In 2015, the NFL began airing London games outside of these agreements. In 2015 and 2017, one game streamed on Yahoo! Sports. Beginning in 2016, NFL Network began airing at least one London game per season. In 2022 and 2023, with new broadcasting agreements, one NFL London Series game per season aired on ESPN+, with the remaining games on NFL Network. Since 2024, all London games have aired on NFL Network.

For the NFL Mexico series, the 2016, 2019 and 2022 editions aired on ESPN as part of Monday Night Football. Otherwise, the 2017 edition aired on a Sunday afternoon on CBS. The 2026 edition will air on NBC as part of Sunday Night Football.

From 2022 to 2025, all NFL Germany series games aired on NFL Network. The 2026 edition will air on Fox.

For the NFL Brazil series, the inaugural game in 2024 was aired on a Friday night on Peacock. The 2025 edition, again on a Friday night, aired on YouTube TV and for free on YouTube. The 2026 edition aired on a Sunday afternoon on CBS.

All NFL Spain games and the NFL Ireland game in 2025 have all aired on NFL Network. The inaugural NFL France game in 2026 will also air on NFL Network.

For the NFL Australia series, the inaugural game in 2026 aired on Netflix.

== Impact ==
Due to significant time zone differences, from 2007 to 2015 teams playing in London would have their bye week in the following week after their game in London. For 2016, the Indianapolis Colts volunteered to play a game the week after their London game, preferring to have their bye week later in the season. The Colts playing the week after London was also done by the NFL as a test to see team fatigue for evaluation of an eventual London franchise. As Mexico City is within the Central Time Zone—eight NFL teams play home games in Central Time and the rest are within two hours of it—no bye week would be needed for those teams, though they may still by chance be scheduled their regular bye week anyway. For 2017, three teams playing in London (the Baltimore Ravens, Jacksonville Jaguars, and Miami Dolphins), had games immediately following their International Series game. In all three cases, the teams playing after their International Series game were based on the East Coast of the United States and were either at home or (in the Jaguars' case) playing in East Rutherford, New Jersey. In 2018 and 2019 all teams once again received their bye immediately following their international game, including the teams who played in Mexico.

Through 2020, due to NFL rules, teams that were playing in temporary homes as part of a relocation or that were recently awarded the hosting of the Super Bowl were required to play a home game internationally. The Los Angeles Rams, upon relocating from St. Louis, agreed to host an international game from 2016 to 2019, while their new stadium was being built. The Los Angeles Chargers, who would share the stadium with the Rams, also hosted an international game in 2018 and 2019, only getting out of the 2017 game because the team had executed its get out clause to relocate from San Diego after the 2017 International Series games had been announced. The Oakland Raiders, who spent the 2019 offseason in limbo due to the expiration of their stadium deal in Oakland and the lack of an NFL-ready stadium in their eventual home in Las Vegas, also agreed to annual international home games through 2019.

== See also ==
- List of NFL games played outside the United States
- Canadian Football League in the United States
- List of college football games played outside the United States
  - Union Jack Classic
