= Iowa State–Kansas State football rivalry =

American college football rivalry

Farmageddon
- Iowa State Cyclones Kansas State Wildcats
- First meeting: November 10, 1917; Iowa State, 10–7
- Latest meeting: August 23, 2025; Iowa State, 24–21
- Next meeting: November 28, 2026

Statistics
- Total meetings: 109
- All-time series: Iowa State leads, 55–50–4
- Largest victory: Kansas State, 58–7 (2002); Iowa State 48–0 (1943)
- Longest win streak: Iowa State, 10 (1943–1952); Kansas State, 10 (1994–2003, 2008–2017)
- Current win streak: Iowa State, 3 (2023–present)

Locations of Iowa State and Kansas State

The Iowa State–Kansas State football rivalry is an American college football rivalry between the Iowa State Cyclones and the Kansas State Wildcats held every year since 1917, making it one of the longest continuous series in college football history as of 2026. It is also the only never-interrupted rivalry in college football. The October 2016 game marked the 100th straight year the two teams have met. In November 2023, the Big 12 announced its scheduling matrix for the next four seasons, which is set to end the rivalry's continuous streak in 2027.

== History ==
The teams first met in 1917, when both universities were members of the erstwhile Missouri Valley Conference. The match-up continued as an annual conference game through the schools' shift into the Big 12 Conference. The series has been dominated by long winning streaks for both teams, with each team's longest winning streak at 10 games. While Kansas State has gone 26–9 against the Cyclones since 1989, Iowa State leads the series 54–50–4.

Historically, the game was not considered a major rivalry, but in light of changes in the Big 12 in the late 2000s, the universities pushed to highlight it to generate revenue and interest for their football programs. They scheduled two neutral-site games at Arrowhead Stadium in Kansas City, Missouri in 2009 and 2010, which fans and the media dubbed "Farmageddon", a reference to the agricultural roots of these land-grant universities.

In 2024, with the Big 12 expansion to 16 teams, the decision was made to have only 4 rivalries be "protected" (meaning they would be played every year), and the rest would only be played every other year; the Farmageddon rivalry was not one of the protected rivalries. The two teams played in 2024 and are scheduled to play again in 2026. In 2025, the rivalry took place on a neutral site on August 23, 2025 in the Aviva Stadium in Dublin, Ireland, called the Aer Lingus College Football Classic. In 2027, the rivalry's record for longest continuously running rivalry is scheduled to end.

== Game results ==
Iowa State victories	Kansas State victories	Tie games

No.	Date	Location	Winner	Score
1	November 10, 1917	Ames	Iowa State	10–7
2	November 23, 1918	Manhattan	Kansas State	11–0
3	November 15, 1919	Ames	Iowa State	46–0
4	November 13, 1920	Manhattan	Iowa State	17–0
5	November 11, 1921	Ames	Iowa State	7–0
6	November 11, 1922	Manhattan	Kansas State	12–2
7	October 20, 1923	Ames	Tie	7–7
8	November 1, 1924	Manhattan	Iowa State	21–0
9	November 26, 1925	Ames	Kansas State	12–7
10	November 20, 1926	Manhattan	Iowa State	3–2
11	October 29, 1927	Ames	Iowa State	12–7
12	November 17, 1928	Ames	Iowa State	7–0
13	November 9, 1929	Manhattan	Kansas State	3–2
14	November 15, 1930	Ames	Kansas State	13–0
15	November 7, 1931	Ames	Iowa State	7–6
16	November 5, 1932	Manhattan	Kansas State	31–0
17	November 11, 1933	Ames	Kansas State	7–0
18	November 24, 1934	Manhattan	Kansas State	20–0
19	November 9, 1935	Ames	Kansas State	6–0
20	November 14, 1936	Manhattan	Kansas State	47–7
21	November 20, 1937	Ames	Iowa State	13–7
22	November 12, 1938	Manhattan	Tie	13–13
23	November 18, 1939	Ames	Iowa State	10–0
24	November 16, 1940	Manhattan	Iowa State	12–0
25	November 22, 1941	Ames	Tie	12–12
26	November 21, 1942	Manhattan	Kansas State	7–6
27	November 20, 1943	Ames	Iowa State	48–0
28	October 28, 1944	Manhattan	Iowa State	14–0
29	November 3, 1945	Ames	Iowa State	40–13
30	November 2, 1946	Manhattan	Iowa State	13–7
31	November 15, 1947	Ames	Iowa State	14–0
32	October 2, 1948	Manhattan	Iowa State	20–0
33	October 15, 1949	Ames	Iowa State	25–21
34	November 4, 1950	Manhattan	Iowa State	13–7
35	October 13, 1951	Ames	Iowa State	32–6
36	November 22, 1952	Manhattan	Iowa State	27–0
37	October 10, 1953	Ames	Kansas State	20–12
38	November 13, 1954	Manhattan	Kansas State	12–7
39	October 22, 1955	Ames	Kansas State	9–7
40	November 17, 1956	Manhattan	Kansas State	32–6
41	October 26, 1957	Ames	Kansas State	32–10
42	November 15, 1958	Manhattan	Kansas State	14–6
43	October 24, 1959	Ames	Iowa State	26–0
44	November 12, 1960	Manhattan	Iowa State	20–7
45	October 28, 1961	Ames	Iowa State	31–7
46	November 17, 1962	Manhattan	Iowa State	28–14
47	November 16, 1963	Ames	Kansas State	21–10
48	November 14, 1964	Manhattan	Kansas State	7–6
49	November 13, 1965	Ames	Iowa State	38–6
50	November 12, 1966	Manhattan	Iowa State	30–13
51	October 14, 1967	Ames	Iowa State	17–0
52	October 12, 1968	Manhattan	Iowa State	23–14
53	October 18, 1969	Manhattan	Kansas State	34–7
54	October 17, 1970	Ames	Kansas State	17–0
55	October 16, 1971	Manhattan	Iowa State	24–0
56	October 21, 1972	Ames	#20 Iowa State	55–22

No.	Date	Location	Winner	Score
57	October 20, 1973	Manhattan	Kansas State	21–19
58	October 19, 1974	Ames	Iowa State	23–18
59	October 11, 1975	Manhattan	Iowa State	17–7
60	October 30, 1976	Ames	Iowa State	45–14
61	November 12, 1977	Manhattan	Iowa State	22–15
62	November 4, 1978	Ames	Iowa State	24–0
63	October 13, 1979	Manhattan	Iowa State	7–3
64	October 11, 1980	Ames	Iowa State	31–7
65	October 31, 1981	Manhattan	Kansas State	10–7
66	October 30, 1982	Ames	Kansas State	9–3
67	November 12, 1983	Manhattan	Iowa State	49–27
68	November 10, 1984	Ames	Tie	7–7
69	November 16, 1985	Manhattan	Iowa State	21–14
70	November 15, 1986	Ames	Iowa State	48–19
71	November 14, 1987	Ames	Iowa State	16–14
72	November 12, 1988	Manhattan	Iowa State	16–7
73	November 4, 1989	Ames	Iowa State	36–11
74	November 3, 1990	Manhattan	Kansas State	28–14
75	November 9, 1991	Ames	Kansas State	37–7
76	November 5, 1992	Manhattan	Kansas State	22–13
77	November 6, 1993	Ames	Iowa State	27–23
78	November 5, 1994	Manhattan	#15 Kansas State	38–20
79	November 11, 1995	Ames	#7 Kansas State	49–7
80	November 23, 1996	Manhattan	#14 Kansas State	35–20
81	November 22, 1997	Ames	#9 Kansas State	28–3
82	October 24, 1998	Manhattan	#4 Kansas State	52–7
83	September 25, 1999	Ames	#15 Kansas State	35–28
84	November 4, 2000	Manhattan	#19 Kansas State	56–10
85	November 3, 2001	Ames	Kansas State	42–3
86	November 9, 2002	Manhattan	#12 Kansas State	58–7
87	November 8, 2003	Ames	Kansas State	45–0
88	November 20, 2004	Manhattan	Iowa State	37–23
89	November 5, 2005	Ames	Iowa State	45–17
90	October 28, 2006	Manhattan	Kansas State	31–10
91	November 3, 2007	Ames	Iowa State	31–20
92	November 22, 2008	Manhattan	Kansas State	38–30
93	October 3, 2009	Kansas City	Kansas State	24–23
94	September 18, 2010	Kansas City	Kansas State	27–20
95	December 3, 2011	Manhattan	#16 Kansas State	30–23
96	October 13, 2012	Ames	#6 Kansas State	27–21
97	November 2, 2013	Manhattan	Kansas State	41–7
98	September 6, 2014	Ames	#20 Kansas State	32–28
99	November 21, 2015	Manhattan	Kansas State	38–35
100	October 29, 2016	Ames	Kansas State	31–26
101	November 25, 2017	Manhattan	Kansas State	20–19
102	November 24, 2018	Ames	#25 Iowa State	42–38
103	November 30, 2019	Manhattan	Kansas State	27–17
104	November 21, 2020	Ames	#17 Iowa State	45–0
105	October 16, 2021	Manhattan	Iowa State	33–20
106	October 8, 2022	Ames	#20 Kansas State	10–9
107	November 25, 2023	Manhattan	Iowa State	42–35
108	November 30, 2024	Ames	#18 Iowa State	29–21
109	August 23, 2025	Dublin	#22 Iowa State	24–21
110	November 28, 2026	Ames		
Series: Iowa State leads 55–50–4

== See also ==
- List of NCAA college football rivalry games
- List of most-played college football series in NCAA Division I
