= 1991 Fordham Rams football team =

American college football season

1991 Fordham Rams football
- Conference: Patriot League
- Record: 2–8 (0–5 Patriot)
- Head coach: Larry Glueck (6th season)
- Captains: Mark Blazejewski; Gary Brennan
- Home stadium: Coffey Field

1991 Patriot League football standings
	Conf.					Overall
Team	W		L		T	W		L		T
No. 3 Holy Cross $	5	–	0	–	0	11	–	0	–	0
Lehigh	3	–	2	–	0	9	–	2	–	0
Lafayette	3	–	2	–	0	6	–	5	–	0
Colgate	3	–	2	–	0	4	–	7	–	0
Bucknell	1	–	4	–	0	1	–	9	–	0
Fordham	0	–	5	–	0	2	–	8	–	0
$ – Conference champion; Rankings from NCAA Division I-AA Football Committee poll

The 1991 Fordham Rams football team was an American football team that represented Fordham University during the 1991 NCAA Division I-AA football season. For the second straight year, Fordham finished last in the Patriot League.

In their sixth year under head coach Larry Glueck, the Rams compiled a 2–8 record. Mark Blazejewski and Gary Brennan were the team captains.

The Rams were outscored 242 to 149. Their winless (0–5) conference record placed last in the six-team Patriot League standings.

Fordham played its home games at Jack Coffey Field on the university's Rose Hill campus in The Bronx, in New York City.

== Schedule ==
Date	Opponent	Site	Result	Attendance	Source
September 14	Lehigh	Coffey Field; Bronx, NY	L 7–32	4,300	
September 21	Bucknell	Coffey Field; Bronx, NY	L 14–21	3,121	
September 28	Princeton*	Coffey Field; Bronx, NY	L 17–20	3,742	
October 5	at Columbia*	Wien Stadium; New York, NY (rivalry)	W 20–16	3,650	
October 12	Harvard^{†}*	Coffey Field; Bronx, NY	W 14–7	5,762	
October 19	Hofstra*	Coffey Field; Bronx, NY	L 30–50		
October 26	at Colgate	Andy Kerr Stadium; Hamilton, NY	L 12–25		
November 9	at Lafayette	Fisher Field; Easton, PA	L 7–33	1,731	
November 16	vs. No. 3 Holy Cross	Gaelic Grounds; Limerick, Ireland (Wild Geese Classic, rivalry)	L 19–24	17,411	
November 23	No. 7 Villanova*	Coffey Field; Bronx, NY	L 9–14	4,739	
*Non-conference game; ^{†}Homecoming; Rankings from NCAA Division I-AA Football Committee Poll released prior to the game
