= Lou Maranzana =

American football player and coach

Biographical details
- Born: c. 1947

Playing career

Football
- 1968–1969: Dartmouth

Coaching career (HC unless noted)
- 1973–1977: Chaminade-Madonna Prep (FL) (assistant)
- 1978–1979: Chaminade-Madonna Prep (FL)
- 1980–1981: Dartmouth (LB)
- 1982–1985: Bloomsburg (assistant)
- 1986–1988: Bucknell (assistant)
- 1989–1994: Bucknell

Head coaching record
- Overall: 26–38 (college)

Lou Maranzana (born c. 1947) is an American former football coach. He served as the head football coach at and Bucknell University in Lewisburg, Pennsylvania from 1989 to 1994, compiling a career college football coaching record of 26–38. He was an assistant coach at Bloomsburg University of Pennsylvania under head coach George Landis from 1982 and 1985 and moved to Bucknell when Landis took the head coaching post there in 1986. Maranzana played college football at Dartmouth College.

== Head coaching record ==
=== College ===
Year	Team	Overall	Conference	Standing	Bowl/playoffs
Bucknell Bison (Colonial League / Patriot League) (1989–1994)
1989	Bucknell	5–5	2–2	T–2nd	
1990	Bucknell	7–4	3–2	T–2nd	
1991	Bucknell	1–9	1–4	5th	
1992	Bucknell	4–7	1–4	T–5th	
1993	Bucknell	4–7	3–2	3rd	
1994	Bucknell	5–6	2–3	T–3rd	
Bucknell:		26–38	12–17		
Total:		26–38			
