= 1991 Lehigh Engineers football team =

American college football season

1991 Lehigh Engineers football
- Conference: Patriot League
- Record: 9–2 (3–2 Patriot)
- Head coach: Hank Small (6th season)
- Captains: Rich Clark; Jarrod Johnson; Glenn Kempa
- Home stadium: Goodman Stadium

1991 Patriot League football standings
	Conf.					Overall
Team	W		L		T	W		L		T
No. 3 Holy Cross $	5	–	0	–	0	11	–	0	–	0
Lehigh	3	–	2	–	0	9	–	2	–	0
Lafayette	3	–	2	–	0	6	–	5	–	0
Colgate	3	–	2	–	0	4	–	7	–	0
Bucknell	1	–	4	–	0	1	–	9	–	0
Fordham	0	–	5	–	0	2	–	8	–	0
$ – Conference champion; Rankings from NCAA Division I-AA Football Committee poll

The 1991 Lehigh Engineers football team was an American football team that represented Lehigh University during the 1991 NCAA Division I-AA football season. Lehigh tied for second in the Patriot League.

In their sixth year under head coach Hank Small, the Engineers compiled a 9–2 record. Rich Clark, Jarrod Johnson and Glenn Kempa were the team captains.

The Engineers outscored opponents 363 to 235. Lehigh's 3–2 conference record earned a three-way tie for second place in the six-team Patriot League standings.

A six-game win streak to start the year resulted in Lehigh appearing in the weekly national rankings from mid-October to early November. A loss to unranked Colgate bounced the Engineers from the top 20, and they finished the year unranked.

Lehigh played its home games at Goodman Stadium on the university's Goodman Campus in Bethlehem, Pennsylvania.

== Schedule ==
Date	Opponent	Rank	Site	Result	Attendance	Source
September 14	at Fordham		Coffey Field; Bronx, NY	W 32–7	4,300	
September 21	at Connecticut*		Memorial Stadium; Storrs, CT	W 35–19	13,112	
September 28	at Columbia*		Wien Stadium; New York, NY	W 22–9	4,045	
October 5	Dartmouth*		Goodman Stadium; Bethlehem, PA	W 30–28	12,000	
October 12	at Northeastern*		Goodman Stadium; Bethlehem, PA	W 35–22	5,012	
October 19	Penn*	No. 20	Goodman Stadium; Bethlehem, PA	W 28–17	10,394	
October 26	at No. 3 Holy Cross	No. 19	Fitton Field; Worcester, MA	L 42–43	14,055	
November 2	William & Mary*	No. 20	Goodman Stadium; Bethlehem, PA	W 41–37	11,083	
November 9	at Colgate	No. 17	Andy Kerr Stadium; Hamilton, NY	L 21–22	2,500	
November 16	at Bucknell		Christy Mathewson–Memorial Stadium; Lewisburg, PA	W 41–13	3,144	
November 23	Lafayette		Goodman Stadium; Bethlehem, PA (The Rivalry)	W 36–18	19,110	
*Non-conference game; Rankings from NCAA Division I-AA Football Committee Poll released prior to the game
