= Gaelic Grounds =

Gaelic games stadium in Limerick, Ireland

- Páirc na nGael
- Interactive map of Gaelic Grounds
- Location: Ennis Road, Limerick, County Limerick, V94 CF77, Ireland
- Coordinates: 52°40′12″N 8°39′15″W
- Owner: Limerick GAA
- Capacity: 44,023 Capacity history: 49,866 (2004–2016) 44,023 (2016–present)
- Surface: grass
- Field size: 137 m × 82 m (449 ft × 269 ft)
- Public transit: Limerick Colbert Railway Station; Northtown Shopping Centre Bus Stop; Ennis Road Bus Stop

Construction
- Opened: 1928
- Renovated: 2004

The Gaelic Grounds, known for sponsorship reasons as the TUS Gaelic Grounds, is the principal GAA stadium in the city of Limerick in Ireland. Home to the Limerick hurling and football teams, it has a capacity of 44,023.

== History ==
9 October 1926 saw first steps taken towards creating the Limerick Gaelic Grounds. A farm containing 12 acres (4.9 ha) was purchased at Coolraine on the Ennis Road for development as a GAA sports ground. Two years later, the new grounds at Páirc na nGael were officially opened with two junior hurling games. The first big effort to raise funds for the development of the grounds was in 1932, with the establishment of a development committee, whose remit was to level the pitch, providing sideline seating and erect a boundary wall.

The 1950s saw crowds of up to 50,000 attending games in the grounds. In 1958, a new stand was built at the grounds. This stand, the Old Hogan Stand from Croke Park, was dismantled in Dublin and reassembled at the Gaelic Grounds in Limerick.

There was record paid attendance at the stadium, of 61,174, for the Munster hurling final between Cork and Tipperary in 1961. It has been estimated that a further 10,000 spectators attended this game, without paying, after the gates were broken down.

In 1979, a decision was taken to update the grounds completely. It took three years before plans were drawn up for a new stand and, in 1986, planning permission was granted by Limerick Corporation for the Mick Mackey Stand. The updated stand was completed in 1988, just in time for the Munster hurling final.

In 2004, the biggest rejuvenation of the Gaelic Grounds was completed with the opening of a new uncovered 12,000 seater stand along with two new terraces behind both goals at a cost of €12 million. While this brought the capacity to 49,866, to comply with health and safety restrictions and due to renovation works in subsequent years, the maximum official capacity stands at 44,023.

In 2014, the stadium played host to an All Ireland SFC semi-final replay between Mayo and Kerry. This was the first time in over thirty years that a semi-final of the SFC had been played outside Croke Park. Over 36,000 attended the game.

In 2019, Limerick GAA and Limerick Institute of Technology (LIT) entered a partnership agreement, the first of its kind in Ireland, which included the renaming of the stadium as LIT Gaelic Grounds. The partnership included elements such as a scholarship scheme, student internships and shared facilities.

During the COVID-19 pandemic, the Gaelic Grounds was used as a drive-through test centre.

== Other sports ==
The Gaelic Grounds hosted an American college football game in 1991. The game, known as the Wild Geese Classic, was held on 16 November 1991 between the Fordham Rams and Holy Cross Crusaders. The Crusaders won the game 24-19 to take the Ram-Crusader Cup.

In 2010, as part of the 2010 International Rules Series, the stadium hosted an International Rules Series between Australia and Ireland.

== See also ==
- List of Gaelic Athletic Association stadiums
- List of stadiums in Ireland by capacity
