= 1991 Lafayette Leopards football team =

American college football season

1991 Lafayette Leopards football
- Conference: Patriot League
- Record: 6–5 (3–2 Patriot)
- Head coach: Bill Russo (11th season)
- Captains: Dave Levine; Tim Moncman
- Home stadium: Fisher Field

1991 Patriot League football standings
| | Conf. | | | | | Overall |
| Team | W | | L | | T | W | | L | | T |
|---|---|---|---|---|---|---|---|---|---|---|
| No. 3 Holy Cross $ | 5 | – | 0 | – | 0 | 11 | – | 0 | – | 0 |
| Lehigh | 3 | – | 2 | – | 0 | 9 | – | 2 | – | 0 |
| Lafayette | 3 | – | 2 | – | 0 | 6 | – | 5 | – | 0 |
| Colgate | 3 | – | 2 | – | 0 | 4 | – | 7 | – | 0 |
| Bucknell | 1 | – | 4 | – | 0 | 1 | – | 9 | – | 0 |
| Fordham | 0 | – | 5 | – | 0 | 2 | – | 8 | – | 0 |
$ – Conference champion; Rankings from NCAA Division I-AA Football Committee poll

The 1991 Lafayette Leopards football team was an American football team that represented Lafayette College during the 1991 NCAA Division I-AA football season. Lafayette tied for second in the Patriot League.

In their eleventh year under head coach Bill Russo, the Leopards compiled a 6–5 record. Dave Levine and Tim Moncman were the team captains.

The Leopards outscored opponents 312 to 277. Lafayette's 3–2 conference record earned a three-way tie for second in the six-team Colonial League standings.

Lafayette played its home games at Fisher Field on College Hill in Easton, Pennsylvania.

== Schedule ==
| Date | Opponent | Site | Result | Attendance | Source |
|---|---|---|---|---|---|
| September 14 | Buffalo* | Fisher Field; Easton, PA | W 42–21 | 4,312 | |
| September 21 | at Virginia Military* | Alumni Memorial Field; Lexington, VA | L 21–42 | 6,825 | |
| September 28 | at Yale* | Fisher Field; Easton, PA | L 14–24 | 10,411 | |
| October 5 | at Penn* | Franklin Field; Philadelphia, PA | W 20–12 | 8,712 | |
| October 12 | Bucknell^{†} | Fisher Field; Easton, PA | W 20–16 | 8,205 | |
| October 19 | Columbia* | Fisher Field; Easton, PA | W 30–15 | 5,113 | |
| October 26 | at Hofstra* | Hofstra Stadium; Hempstead, NY | L 17–60 | 6,712 | |
| November 2 | at No. 3 Holy Cross | Fitton Field; Worcester, MA | L 14–48 | 10,331 | |
| November 9 | Fordham* | Fisher Field; Easton, PA | W 33–7 | 1,731 | |
| November 16 | Colgate | Fisher Field; Easton, PA | W 48–31 | 3,187 | |
| November 23 | at Lehigh | Goodman Stadium; Bethlehem, PA (The Rivalry) | L 18–36 | 19,110 | |
*Non-conference game; ^{†}Homecoming; Rankings from NCAA Division I-AA Football Committee Poll released prior to the game
