= 1991 Bucknell Bison football team =

American college football season

1991 Bucknell Bison football
- Conference: Patriot League
- Record: 1–9 (1–4 Patriot)
- Head coach: Lou Maranzana (3rd season)
- Captains: Brian Henesey; John Spatafore
- Home stadium: Christy Mathewson–Memorial Stadium

1991 Patriot League football standings
	Conf.					Overall
Team	W		L		T	W		L		T
No. 3 Holy Cross $	5	–	0	–	0	11	–	0	–	0
Lehigh	3	–	2	–	0	9	–	2	–	0
Lafayette	3	–	2	–	0	6	–	5	–	0
Colgate	3	–	2	–	0	4	–	7	–	0
Bucknell	1	–	4	–	0	1	–	9	–	0
Fordham	0	–	5	–	0	2	–	8	–	0
$ – Conference champion; Rankings from NCAA Division I-AA Football Committee poll

The 1991 Bucknell Bison football team was an American football team that represented Bucknell University during the 1991 NCAA Division I-AA football season. It finished second-to-last in the Patriot League.

Bucknell played its home games at Christy Mathewson–Memorial Stadium on the university campus in Lewisburg, Pennsylvania.

In its third year under head coach Lou Maranzana, the Bison compiled a 1–9 record. Brian Henesey and John Spatafore were the team captains.

The Bison were outscored 326 to 99. Bucknell's 1–4 conference record placed fifth in the six-team Patriot League standings.

== Schedule ==
Date	Opponent	Site	Result	Attendance	Source
September 6	at Hofstra*	Hofstra Stadium; Hempstead, NY	L 7–43		
September 14	Villanova*	Christy Mathewson–Memorial Stadium; Lewisburg, PA	L 0–40	5,736	
September 21	at Fordham	Coffey Field; Bronx, NY	W 21–14	3,121	
September 28	at Dartmouth*	Memorial Field; Hanover, NH	L 16–34	5,928	
October 5	Cornell^{†}*	Christy Mathewson–Memorial Stadium; Lewisburg, PA	L 7–23	6,551	
October 12	at Lafayette	Fisher Field; Easton, PA	L 16–20	8,205	
October 19	at Princeton*	Palmer Stadium; Princeton, NJ	L 7–31	10,736	
November 2	at Colgate	Andy Kerr Stadium; Hamilton, NY	L 6–38		
November 9	No. 3 Holy Cross^	Christy Mathewson–Memorial Stadium; Lewisburg, PA	L 6–42	4,862	
November 16	Lehigh	Christy Mathewson–Memorial Stadium; Lewisburg, PA	L 13–41	3,144	
*Non-conference game; ^{†}Homecoming; ^ Parents Weekend; Rankings from NCAA Division I-AA Football Committee Poll released prior to the game
