= 1991 Holy Cross Crusaders football team =

American college football season

1991 Holy Cross Crusaders football

Patriot League champion
- Conference: Patriot League
- Record: 11–0 (5–0 Patriot)
- Head coach: Mark Duffner (6th season)
- Home stadium: Fitton Field

1991 Patriot League football standings
	Conf.					Overall
Team	W		L		T	W		L		T
No. 3 Holy Cross $	5	–	0	–	0	11	–	0	–	0
Lehigh	3	–	2	–	0	9	–	2	–	0
Lafayette	3	–	2	–	0	6	–	5	–	0
Colgate	3	–	2	–	0	4	–	7	–	0
Bucknell	1	–	4	–	0	1	–	9	–	0
Fordham	0	–	5	–	0	2	–	8	–	0
$ – Conference champion; Rankings from NCAA Division I-AA Football Committee poll

The 1991 Holy Cross Crusaders football team was an American football team that represented the College of the Holy Cross as a member of the Patriot League during the 1991 NCAA Division I-AA football season. In its sixth year under head coach Mark Duffner, the team compiled an 11–0 record (5–0 against conference opponents), won the Patriot League championship, and was ranked No. 3 in the NCAA Division I-AA Football Committee poll. The team played its home games at Fitton Field in Worcester, Massachusetts.

== Schedule ==
Date	Opponent	Rank	Site	Result	Attendance	Source
September 14	at UMass*	No. 14	McGuirk Stadium; Hadley, MA	W 22–20	13,562	
September 21	at Boston University*	No. 10	Nickerson Field; Boston, MA	W 27–23	5,181	
September 28	Penn*	No. 9	Fitton Field; Worcester, MA	W 45–0	11,591	
October 5	at Harvard*	No. 7	Harvard Stadium; Boston, MA	W 28–13	16,225	
October 12	at Dartmouth*	No. 5	Memorial Field; Hanover, NH	W 23–6	6,012	
October 19	Brown*	No. 3	Fitton Field; Worcester, MA	W 42–28	15,481	
October 26	at No. 19 Lehigh	No. 3	Goodman Stadium; Bethlehem, PA	W 43–42	14,055	
November 2	Lafayette	No. 3	Fitton Field; Worcester, MA	W 48–14	10,331	
November 9	at Bucknell	No. 3	Christy Mathewson–Memorial Stadium; Lewisburg, PA	W 42–6	4,862	
November 16	vs. Fordham	No. 3	Gaelic Grounds; Limerick, Ireland (Wild Geese Classic, rivalry)	W 24–19	17,411	
November 23	Colgate	No. 3	Fitton Field; Worcester, MA	W 28–3	12,881	
*Non-conference game; Rankings from NCAA Division I-AA Football Committee Poll released prior to the game
