= 1991 Colgate Red Raiders football team =

American college football season

1991 Colgate Red Raiders football
- Conference: Patriot League
- Record: 4–7 (3–2 Patriot)
- Head coach: Michael Foley (4th season)
- Captains: Rich Burke; George Delaney; Mike Jasper
- Home stadium: Andy Kerr Stadium

1991 Patriot League football standings
	Conf.					Overall
Team	W		L		T	W		L		T
No. 3 Holy Cross $	5	–	0	–	0	11	–	0	–	0
Lehigh	3	–	2	–	0	9	–	2	–	0
Lafayette	3	–	2	–	0	6	–	5	–	0
Colgate	3	–	2	–	0	4	–	7	–	0
Bucknell	1	–	4	–	0	1	–	9	–	0
Fordham	0	–	5	–	0	2	–	8	–	0
$ – Conference champion; Rankings from NCAA Division I-AA Football Committee poll

The 1991 Colgate Red Raiders football team was an American football team that represented Colgate University during the 1991 NCAA Division I-AA football season. Colgate tied for second in the Patriot League.

In its fourth season under head coach Michael Foley, the team compiled a 4–7 record. Rich Burke, George Delaney and Mike Jasper were the team captains.

The Red Raiders were outscored 321 to 224. Colgate's 3–2 conference record earned a three-way tie for second place in the six-team Patriot League standings.

The team played home games at Andy Kerr Stadium in Hamilton, New York.

== Schedule ==
Date	Opponent	Site	Result	Attendance	Source
September 7	Northeastern*	Andy Kerr Stadium; Hamilton, NY	L 10–35	4,750	
September 14	at Army*	Michie Stadium; West Point, NY	L 22–51	29,924	
September 21	at Duke*	Wallace Wade Stadium; Durham, NC	L 14–42	20,200	
September 28	at Cornell*	Schoellkopf Field; Ithaca, NY (rivalry)	W 31–13	15,000	
October 5	at Princeton*	Palmer Stadium; Princeton, NJ	L 20–31	10,842	
October 12	Yale*	Andy Kerr Stadium; Hamilton, NY	L 7–25	4,500	
October 26	Fordham	Andy Kerr Stadium; Hamilton, NY	W 25–12		
November 2	Bucknell	Andy Kerr Stadium; Hamilton, NY	W 38–6		
November 9	No. 17 Lehigh	Andy Kerr Stadium; Hamilton, NY	W 22–21	2,500	
November 16	at Lafayette	Fisher Field; Easton, PA	L 31–48	3,187	
November 23	at No. 3 Holy Cross	Fitton Field; Worcester, MA	L 3–28	12,881	
*Non-conference game; Rankings from NCAA Division I-AA Football Committee Poll released prior to the game
