= Haka Bowl =

- Location: New Zealand

The Haka Bowl was a proposed American college football game scheduled to be played in New Zealand in 1996.

Named for the traditional Māori haka, and promoted by NFL linebacker Riki Ellison (who was born in New Zealand), the Haka Bowl was planned to be the first post-season bowl game to be played outside the United States in half a century, since the Bacardi Bowl in Cuba in 1946. The game matched up the third place teams from the then Pacific-10 Conference (now the Pac-12 Conference) and Western Athletic Conference (stopped playing football after the 2012–13 season). The payout for participating teams was set at $1.5 million, double the NCAA's standard minimum at that time, and the minimum payout set for an international game.

However, the contest, scheduled for 27 December 1996, was never played: when the Haka Bowl committee could not come up with financial guarantees, the NCAA revoked the license for the game, and the idea died. It would be another decade, until the International Bowl was played in Toronto, Ontario, Canada, on 6 January 2007, that a college football bowl game would be played outside the United States.
