= Ram–Crusader Cup =

United States football trophy

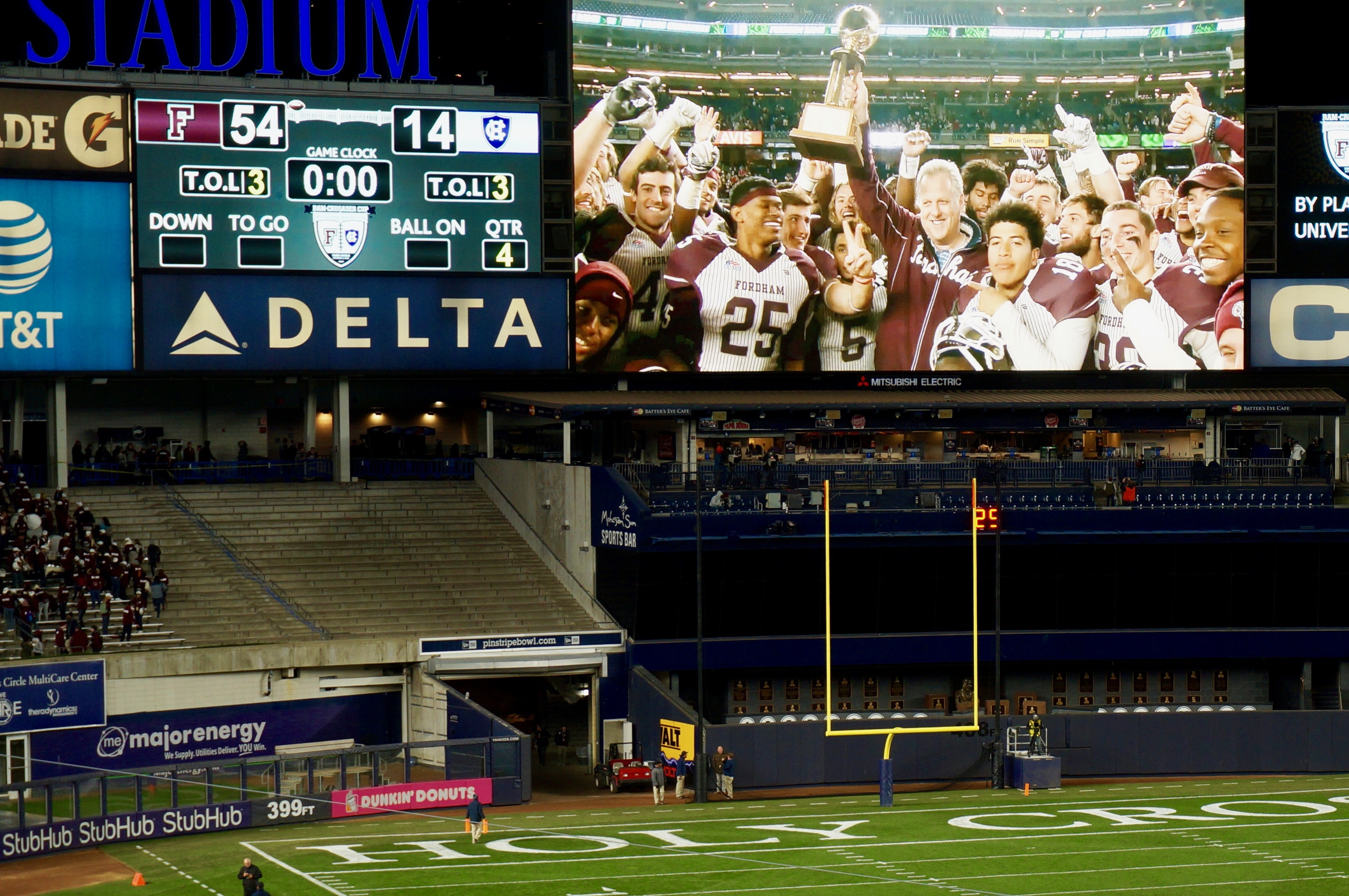
- Fordham celebrates winning the 2016 Cup at Yankee Stadium

- Fordham Rams Holy Cross Crusaders
- Sport: Football
- First meeting: November 8, 1902; Holy Cross 17, Fordham 0
- Latest meeting: November 21, 2026; Holy Cross 20, Fordham 10
- Next meeting: 2027
- Trophy: Ram–Crusader Cup

Statistics
- Total meetings: 64
- All-time series: Holy Cross leads, 36–26–2
- Trophy series: Holy Cross leads, 24–16
- Largest victory: Holy Cross, 60–0 (1913)
- Longest win streak: Holy Cross, 11 (1947–1994)
- Longest unbeaten streak: Holy Cross, 12 (1931–1994)
- Current win streak: Holy Cross, 1 (2026–present)

Locations of Fordham and Holy Cross

The Ram–Crusader Cup is the name of the trophy awarded to the winner of the annual football game between the Fordham Rams and the Holy Cross Crusaders. Both schools are members of the Patriot League.

== Origin of the Cup ==
The Ram–Crusader Cup was instituted in 1951 to honor the memory of Major Frank W. Cavanaugh. The idea for the Cup came from William P. Walsh, at the time, a Holy Cross undergrad. Walsh was working at a summer camp headed by then Fordham head coach, Ed Danowski, when hearing that the Rams and Crusaders were restarting their series. Despite being enrolled at Holy Cross, Walsh grew up on Long Island as a Fordham football fan. The summer camp counselor approached his boss and suggested inaugurating a trophy in honor of Major Frank Cavanaugh. The "Iron Major” spent three seasons as head coach of Holy Cross (1903-1905) where he had a 19–10–2 record, and six at Fordham (1927-1932) where he had a 34–14–4 record and also elevated the program to college football's highest level. Danowski, who had captained Cavanaugh's last team while a quarterback for the Rams, looked forward to the trophy game and enthusiastically predicted Fordham would “pin back the ears” of the Crusaders. Instead, it was Holy Cross easily prevailing in a 54–20 blowout. John Cavanaugh, son of the Hall of Fame coach, later made the post-game trophy presentation to Holy Cross. Contests staged in 1952, '53 and '54 were all far closer affairs but each also ended with Holy Cross victories. When Fordham terminated their football program following the 1954 season the Cup was put on hiatus.

== Return of the Cup ==
Although Holy Cross never terminated their own program, from about the early 1950s to the early 1980s they played a mostly regional schedule at a lower Division I level with only mixed results. In 1982 they moved down to I-AA status where, under Coach Rick E. Carter and later Mark Duffner, fortunes quickly changed. From 1982 to 1991 they finished with a Top-20 national ranking every year but one. Meanwhile, after years without a team, and later, years as a club team, followed by years as a D-III team, Fordham finally elevated their own program to the I-AA level for the 1989 season. The Rams officially joined the Patriot League (then still known as the Colonial League) the following season thus allowing them to resume their series with Holy Cross.

36 years had passed since their last gridiron encounter but once again it was Holy Cross dominating with a 48–0 conquest. The Worcester school kept their monopoly on the "Iron Major Cup" until Fordham finally broke through with a win in 1995. It started a run where the Rams won 15 of 22. Since then, Holy Cross is currently on a seven-game winning streak and leads the Ram–Crusader Cup series, 23–15. They also lead the all-time series 34–25–2 which dates back to 1902, a year before Cavanaugh began patrolling Holy Cross’ sidelines.

The 2016 game was played on November 12, at Yankee Stadium, where in front of 21,000+ fans, Fordham routed Holy Cross, 54–14. This marked Fordham's first game at The Stadium since 1946 and the first encounter between the schools at a professional venue since 1954. Previous Cups were staged in Ireland (1991) and Bermuda (1995).

== Game results ==
Fordham victories	Holy Cross victories	Tie games

No.	Date	Location	Winner	Score
1	November 8, 1902	New York	Holy Cross	17–0
2	November 20, 1905	New York	Holy Cross	27–5
3	November 3, 1906	Worcester	Holy Cross	8–5
4	November 29, 1906	New York	Holy Cross	15–6
5	November 2, 1907	Worcester	Fordham	35–0
6	November 28, 1907	New York	Fordham	35–0
7	November 20, 1909	New York	Fordham	9–5
8	November 15, 1913	Worcester	Holy Cross	60–0
9	October 23, 1915	New York	Fordham	9–0
10	November 18, 1916	Worcester	Fordham	40–0
11	October 20, 1917	New York	Fordham	12–0
12	November 18, 1922	Worcester	Holy Cross	28–0
13	November 10, 1923	New York	Holy Cross	23–7
14	October 25, 1924	Worcester	Holy Cross	13–0
15	November 7, 1925	New York	Fordham	17–0
16	November 6, 1926	Worcester	Tie	7–7
17	November 5, 1927	New York	Holy Cross	7–2
18	October 28, 1928	Worcester	Fordham	19–13
19	October 19, 1929	New York	Fordham	7–0
20	October 18, 1930	Worcester	Fordham	6–0
21	October 17, 1931	New York	Tie	6–6
22	November 22, 1947	Worcester	Holy Cross	48–0
23	November 13, 1948	Worcester	Holy Cross	13–6
24	October 6, 1951	Worcester	Holy Cross	54–20
25	October 4, 1952	Worcester	Holy Cross	12–7
26	November 21, 1953	Worcester	Holy Cross	20–7
27	November 13, 1954	New York	Holy Cross	20–19
28	November 10, 1990	New York	Holy Cross	48–0
29	November 16, 1991	Limerick	Holy Cross	24–19
30	November 21, 1992	Worcester	Holy Cross	21–13
31	November 20, 1993	Worcester	Holy Cross	28–12
32	October 29, 1994	New York	Holy Cross	31–21
33	October 28, 1995	Hamilton	Fordham	17–10

No.	Date	Location	Winner	Score
34	November 2, 1996	New York	Fordham	28–0
35	November 22, 1997	Worcester	Fordham	28–12
36	November 14, 1998	Worcester	Fordham	13–10
37	November 13, 1999	New York	Holy Cross	37–14
38	November 18, 2000	Worcester	Holy Cross	27–20
39	November 17, 2001	New York	Fordham	24–21
40	November 9, 2002	Worcester	Fordham	37–27
41	November 8, 2003	New York	Fordham	49–28
42	October 2, 2004	Worcester	Fordham	42–35
43	October 29, 2005	New York	Fordham	24–20
44	September 30, 2006	Worcester	Holy Cross	28–21
45	November 3, 2007	New York	Fordham	24–21
46	November 8, 2008	Worcester	Holy Cross	38–17
47	October 31, 2009	New York	Holy Cross	41–27
48	October 2, 2010	Worcester	Holy Cross	36–31
49	November 19, 2011	New York	Holy Cross	41–21
50	October 27, 2012	Worcester	Fordham	36–32
51	November 2, 2013	New York	Fordham	32–30
52	September 27, 2014	Worcester	Fordham	45–16
53	October 17, 2015	New York	Fordham	47–41^{OT}
54	November 12, 2016	New York	Fordham	54–14
55	November 4, 2017	New York	Holy Cross	42–20
56	November 10, 2018	Worcester	Holy Cross	17–13
57	November 16, 2019	New York	Holy Cross	49–27
58	March 27, 2021	Worcester	Holy Cross	34–24
59	November 13, 2021	New York	Holy Cross	52–24
60	October 29, 2022	Worcester	Holy Cross	53–52^{OT}
61	October 28, 2023	New York	Holy Cross	49–47
62	October 12, 2024	Worcester	Holy Cross	19–16
63	September 27, 2025	New York	Fordham	26–21
64	November 21, 2026	Worcester	Holy Cross	20–10
Series: Holy Cross leads 36–26–2

== See also ==
- List of NCAA college football rivalry games
