= Mark Duffner =

American football coach (born 1953)

Profile
- Position: Senior defensive assistant

Personal information
- Born: July 19, 1953 (age 73); Annandale, Virginia, U.S.

Career information
- College: William & Mary

Career history
- Ohio State (1975–1976) Graduate assistant; Cincinnati (1977–1980) Defensive coordinator; Holy Cross (1981–1985) Defensive coordinator; Holy Cross (1986–1991) Head coach; Maryland (1992–1996) Head coach; Cincinnati Bengals (1997–2000) Linebackers coach; Cincinnati Bengals (2001–2002) Defensive coordinator/linebackers; Green Bay Packers (2003–2005) Linebackers coach; Jacksonville Jaguars (2006–2013) Linebackers coach; Miami Dolphins (2014–2015) Linebackers coach; Tampa Bay Buccaneers (2016–2017) Linebackers coach; Tampa Bay Buccaneers (2018) Defensive coordinator/linebackers; Cincinnati Bengals (2019–2024) Senior defensive assistant

Head coaching record
- Career: NCAA: 80–40–1 (.665)
- Coaching profile at Pro Football Reference

Mark Duffner (born July 19, 1953) is an American football coach, he was recently the senior defensive assistant for the Cincinnati Bengals of the National Football League (NFL). Duffner also served as the head coach of the Maryland Terrapins from 1992 to 1996.

Duffner was born and raised in the Washington, D.C. suburb of Annandale, Virginia; he played tackle for legendary coach Bob Hardage at powerhouse Annandale High School and played collegiately at William & Mary, recruited to the school by assistant coach Bobby Ross. His first coaching job was as a graduate assistant under iconic coach Woody Hayes at Ohio State followed by a stint as defensive coordinator for Cincinnati; he moved to Holy Cross in the same role in 1981 and ascended to the head coach position in 1986, compiling a stellar 60–5–1 record. At Maryland, Duffner compiled a 20–35 record. His most important legacy at Maryland has been in the record books; most of the Terps' longstanding single game, season, and career passing and receiving record were broken during his tenure. This was due to the implementation of his run and shoot offense and quarterbacks John Kaleo, Scott Milanovich, and Brian Cummings. However, his teams were notoriously weak on defense, frequently giving up points so fast that even his prolific offense couldn't keep up. Duffner's only winning season came in 1995 when the Terps finished with a 6–5 record and started with four consecutive wins.

After leaving Maryland, Duffner became an assistant with the Cincinnati Bengals from 1997 to 2002, where he served as linebackers coach and then defensive coordinator. From 2003 to 2005, he served with the Green Bay Packers. In early 2006, he was signed by the Jacksonville Jaguars as the linebackers coach. He was hired by the Miami Dolphins in January to be their linebackers coach for the 2014 season. On October 15, 2018, Duffner was named as the new defensive coordinator of the Tampa Bay Buccaneers.

Duffner was hired by the Cincinnati Bengals as a senior defensive assistant on March 7, 2019. He missed the team's week 10 game in 2020 against the Pittsburgh Steelers due to COVID-19 pandemic protocols.

Duffner was fired by the Bengals at the end of the 2024 season.

The surname Duffner originates from the German habitational name for someone from Teufen in Württemberg or from Tüffen near Saint Gallen, in Switzerland.

== Head coaching record ==
Year	Team	Overall	Conference	Standing	Bowl/playoffs	NCAA^{#}
Holy Cross Crusaders (Patriot League) (1986–1991)
1986	Holy Cross	10–1	4–0	1st		5
1987	Holy Cross	11–0	4–0	1st		1
1988	Holy Cross	9–2	3–1	2nd		19
1989	Holy Cross	10–1	4–0	1st		T–4
1990	Holy Cross	9–1–1	5–0	1st		8
1991	Holy Cross	11–0	5–0	1st		3
Holy Cross:		60–5–1	25–1			
Maryland Terrapins (Atlantic Coast Conference) (1992–1996)
1992	Maryland	3–8	2–6	8th		
1993	Maryland	2–9	2–6	T–7th		
1994	Maryland	4–7	2–6	7th		
1995	Maryland	6–5	4–4	T–5th		
1996	Maryland	5–6	3–5	T–6th		
Maryland:		20–35	13–27			
Total:		80–40–1				
National championship Conference title Conference division title or championship game berth
