= College football in Ireland =

American football in Ireland

Aer Lingus College Football Classic
- Stadium: Aviva Stadium
- Location: Dublin, Ireland
- Previous stadiums: Lansdowne Road; Croke Park
- Operated: 1988–1989, 1996, 2012, 2014, 2016, 2022–present
- Website: collegefootballireland.com

Former names
- Croke Park Classic; Emerald Isle Classic; Shamrock Classic

2025 matchup
- No. 22 Iowa State 24, No. 17 Kansas State 21

2026 matchup
- North Carolina 15, TCU 10

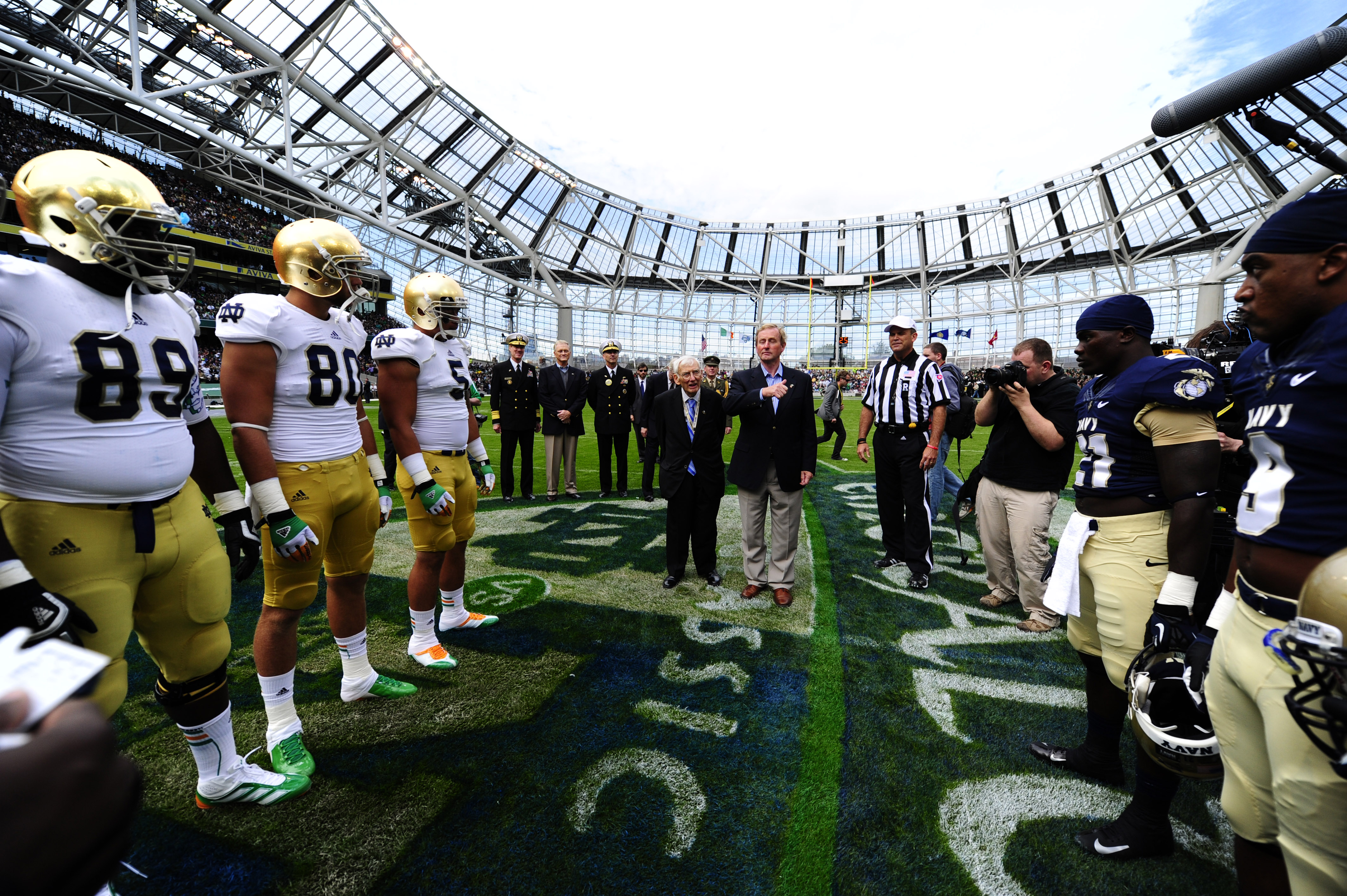
US Ambassador Dan Rooney and Taoiseach Enda Kenny take part in the ceremonial coin toss before the 2012 game at Aviva Stadium

College football in Ireland began initially in 1988 as part of a promotional campaign to mark the Dublin millennium celebrations. Initially known as the Emerald Isle Classic, it was the "first major" NCAA-sanctioned American college football game played in Europe. The first games were played at Lansdowne Road in Dublin in 1988 and 1989.

The event was first proposed and arranged by Aidan J. Prendergast and Jim O'Brien. Prendergast, who was a former president of the Irish American Football Association, conceived the idea of bringing a major NCAA game to Ireland in the mid-1980s and started pitching the idea on both sides of the Atlantic. Prendergast promoted both the 1988 and 1989 games.

Also previously known as the Shamrock Classic, from 2016 the event was marketed as the Aer Lingus College Football Classic.

== History ==
=== 1988 ===
The inaugural Emerald Isle Classic was held at Lansdowne Road in Dublin with a crowd of 42,524 in attendance. It featured a 2–7 Boston College team led by Mark Kamphaus that beat the 8–1 Army Black Knights 38–24.

=== 1989 ===
The second annual Emerald Isle Classic was held at Lansdowne Road on 2 December 1989. In the contest, Pittsburgh defeated Rutgers by a final score of 46–29 before a crowd of 19,800.

=== 1991 ===
On 16 November 1991, an NCAA-sanctioned American college football game was played at the Gaelic Grounds in Limerick. The game, marketed as the Wild Geese Classic, coincided with the 300th anniversary of the Flight of the Wild Geese of 1691 and was named for the Irish soldiers who resisted the Siege of Limerick. The game matched NCAA Division I-AA teams Fordham and Holy Cross with Holy Cross winning 24–19.

While the Gaelic Grounds had a capacity at the time of about 50,000 people, the game had an attendance of approximately 12,000. According to a contemporary report in the New York Times, some of the local Irish attendees (including the sports editor from the Limerick Leader) queried how substitutions could be made freely between plays. And, while some were unfamiliar with "linebackers and end-arounds", the attendees "did recognize high hang-time punts".

=== 1993 ===
The 1993 Emerald Isle Classic was scheduled to be played at Fitzgerald Stadium in Killarney. To be played on October 9, the game was to have been a matchup against Yankee Conference rivals UMass and Rhode Island. In August 1993, the game was relocated from Ireland to McGuirk Stadium in Hadley, Massachusetts after it was determined the game would be a financial loss for the participating schools.

=== 1996 ===
In 1996, Notre Dame and the United States Naval Academy began a second American football event in Ireland called the Shamrock Classic. The event, played at Croke Park, drew a slightly smaller crowd than the first Emerald Isle Classic. Notre Dame won the game over Navy, setting the record for the longest winning streak over an annual collegiate opponent at 33 wins (Notre Dame added 10 additional wins to the streak, which remains the all-time record at 43 consecutive victories).

=== 2012 ===
A return trip by the teams in 2012, held at Aviva Stadium, was confirmed by the two schools and stadium management in September 2010. The Emerald Isle Classic was tied to the Irish tourism initiative The Gathering, which sought to encourage members of the Irish diaspora (especially in the U.S.) to visit their ancestral home in 2013. The first advance sellout for a sporting event in the two-year history of Aviva Stadium, 15,000 tickets sold in less than two hours, and about 35,000 Americans travelled to Dublin. The 2012 game also aired live in parts of Europe as well as the U.S.

The game provided a huge boost to the Irish economy, estimated to be approximately €100 million.

A total of six players who featured in the Emerald Isle Classic for Notre Dame went on to be selected in the 2013 NFL Draft. Most notably, Tyler Eifert was selected in the first round by the Cincinnati Bengals.

=== 2014 ===
In June 2013, Penn State and UCF were reportedly in negotiations to play their 2014 season opener at Aviva, and the stadium was also seen as a potential venue for a proposed bowl game that would begin that season. The Orlando Sentinel, located in UCF's home city, reported in July 2013 that the teams would play the game at Croke Park instead of Aviva. That month the game, to be called the Croke Park Classic, was confirmed. The Croke Park Classic saw the University of Central Florida (UCF) host Penn State in their 2014 Season Opener in GAA HQ on 30 August 2014. This was the first time UCF and Penn State had played outside the United States and Penn State took the Dan Rooney Trophy in a competitively fought game. 53,304 fans attended the thrilling encounter in which Penn State defeated UCF with a Sam Ficken field goal in the dying seconds, by a final score of 26 to 24. The Irish American Football Association was one of the official partners in the game and provided both promotional and technical assistance to Croke Park.

=== 2016 ===
On 4 June 2015, Irish American Events Limited (IAEL), which is a joint venture between Corporate.ie and Anthony Travel, announced that American college football would return to Ireland in 2016 with a match-up between Boston College and Georgia Tech. The game was played at Aviva Stadium on 3 September 2016, and billed as the Aer Lingus College Football Classic.

The announcement was made at the reception in Dublin attended by the Taoiseach Enda Kenny TD, which was followed by a reception in Boston College in the U.S. attended by the mayor of Boston, Marty Walsh.

Aer Lingus was announced as the title sponsor for the game, with Tourism Ireland, Failte Ireland and the Dublin City Council also lending support.

The game attracted 40,562 spectators and resulted in a 17–14 victory for Georgia Tech.

=== 2020 ===
University of Notre Dame announced on 25 October 2018, that the Fighting Irish would return to Dublin to face Navy Midshipmen at Aviva Stadium on 29 August 2020. On 2 June 2020, it was announced that due to the COVID-19 pandemic, the game would not be played in Dublin and would instead be played at Navy-Marine Corps Memorial Stadium in Annapolis, Maryland. The game would eventually not be played after Notre Dame elected to play an all-ACC schedule for the 2020 season, and the conference disallowed most games outside the conference to maintain the same screening standards for each game.

=== 2022 ===
In 2019, the University of Nebraska–Lincoln announced it would face Illinois at Aviva Stadium in Dublin on 28 August 2021. The trip was canceled due to the COVID-19 pandemic, and the game was instead played in Champaign, Illinois. Nebraska rescheduled its trip to Ireland for 27 August 2022 against Northwestern. Northwestern won 31–28.

=== 2023 ===
The University of Notre Dame announced on 24 October 2022, that the Fighting Irish would return to Dublin to face Navy Midshipmen at Aviva Stadium on 26 August 2023. Notre Dame won 42–3.

=== 2024 ===
Georgia Tech faced off against Florida State in Aviva Stadium to kick off the 2024 college football season on 24 August 2024. Georgia Tech upset the tenth-ranked Seminoles 24–21 with a walkoff, game-winning field goal. For the first time in the history of ESPN’s flagship college football pregame show, College Gameday aired outside of the United States in Dublin to kick off the 2024 college football season. TG4 broadcast this year's edition of the Football Classic live from the Aviva Stadium marking the first time ever that the match was to be broadcast live on free-to-air television in Ireland.

=== 2025 ===
Kansas State played against Iowa State in the Aer Lingus Classic. This was the fourth straight game played in Dublin, and it was the first-ever ranked matchup in Ireland. Kansas State entered the game at #17 and was the favorite to win the conference, while Iowa State entered at #22. Iowa State won the game 24–21, and it was their third straight win against Kansas State.

=== 2026 ===
TCU faced off against North Carolina on 29 August 2026 in the first international game for both programs. Despite being nearly 10-point underdogs heading into the game, North Carolina defeated TCU, 15–10, in a low-scoring game that was affected by rainfall throughout.

== Results ==
Season	Date	Winning team		Losing team		Venue	Attendance	Notes	Ref.
1988	19 November	Boston College	38	Army	24	Lansdowne Road	42,525	Emerald Isle Classic	
1989	2 December	24 Pittsburgh	46	Rutgers	29	Lansdowne Road	19,800	Emerald Isle Classic	
1991	16 November	Holy Cross	24	Fordham	19	Gaelic Grounds	12,000	Wild Geese Classic	
1996	2 November	19 Notre Dame	54	Navy	27	Croke Park	38,651	Shamrock Classic	
2012	1 September	Notre Dame	50	Navy	10	Aviva Stadium	48,820	Emerald Isle Classic	
2014	30 August	Penn State	26	UCF	24	Croke Park	53,304	Croke Park Classic	
2016	3 September	Georgia Tech	17	Boston College	14	Aviva Stadium	40,562	Aer Lingus College Football Classic	
2022	27 August	Northwestern	31	Nebraska	28	Aviva Stadium	42,699	Aer Lingus College Football Classic	
2023	26 August	13 Notre Dame	42	Navy	3	Aviva Stadium	49,000	Aer Lingus College Football Classic	
2024	24 August	Georgia Tech	24	10 Florida State	21	Aviva Stadium	47,998	Aer Lingus College Football Classic	
2025	23 August	22 Iowa State	24	17 Kansas State	21	Aviva Stadium	47,221	Aer Lingus College Football Classic	
2026	29 August	North Carolina	15	TCU	10	Aviva Stadium	40,457	Aer Lingus College Football Classic	

== Future games ==
Season	Date	Matchup		Venue	Notes	Ref.
2027	28 August	Pittsburgh	Wisconsin	Aviva Stadium	Aer Lingus College Football Classic	

== Most appearances ==
Teams with multiple appearances

Rank	Team	Appearances	Record
1	Notre Dame	3	3–0
1	Navy	3	0–3
2	Georgia Tech	2	2–0
2	Boston College	2	1–1

Teams with a single appearance

Won (5): Iowa State, Northwestern, North Carolina, Penn State, Pittsburgh
Lost (7): Army, Florida State, Kansas State, Nebraska, Rutgers, TCU, UCF

== Attendance ==
Updated as of the 2026 event.

Total attendance	483,037
Average attendance	40,253
Highest attendance	53,304; Penn State 26–24 UCF; 30 August 2014
