= 1982 Montana Grizzlies football team =

American college football season

1982 Montana Grizzlies football

Big Sky champion

NCAA Division I-AA First Round, L 7–21 vs. Idaho
- Conference: Big Sky Conference

Ranking
- AP: No. 19
- Record: 6–6 (5–2 Big Sky)
- Head coach: Larry Donovan (3rd season)
- Offensive coordinator: Joe Glenn (1st season)
- Home stadium: Dornblaser Field

1982 Big Sky Conference football standings
	Conf.					Overall
Team	W		L		T	W		L		T
No. 19 Montana $^	5	–	2	–	0	6	–	6	–	0
No. 11 Idaho ^	5	–	2	–	0	9	–	4	–	0
Montana State	5	–	2	–	0	6	–	5	–	0
No. 15 Boise State	4	–	3	–	0	8	–	3	–	0
Nevada	3	–	4	–	0	6	–	5	–	0
Northern Arizona	3	–	4	–	0	4	–	7	–	0
Weber State	2	–	5	–	0	4	–	7	–	0
Idaho State	1	–	6	–	0	3	–	8	–	0
$ – Conference champion; ^ – NCAA Division I-AA playoff participant; Rankings from NCAA Division I-AA Poll

The 1982 Montana Grizzlies football team represented the University of Montana in the 1982 NCAA Division I-AA football season as a member of the Big Sky Conference. The Grizzlies were led by third-year head coach Larry Donovan, played their home games at Dornblaser Field and finished the season with a record of six wins and six losses (6–6, 5–2 Big Sky) as the Big Sky Conference champions. Tied with Idaho and Montana State at the top of the league standings, Montana defeated both to win the tie-breaker and title.

== Schedule ==
Date	Opponent	Rank	Site	Result	Attendance	Source
September 11	at Hawaii*		Aloha Stadium; Halawa, HI	L 0–40	43,317	
September 18	Puget Sound*		Dornblaser Field; Missoula, MT	W 38–10	7,450	
September 25	Northern Arizona		Dornblaser Field; Missoula, MT	W 36–35	8,521	
October 2	at Nevada		Mackay Stadium; Reno, NV	W 28–27	8,112	
October 9	at No. 12 Boise State		Bronco Stadium; Boise, ID	L 14–21	19,464	
October 16	No. 14 Idaho		Dornblaser Field; Missoula, MT (Little Brown Stein)	W 40–16	11,033	
October 23	at Idaho State	No. 18	ASISU MiniDome; Pocatello, ID	L 14–28	10,091	
October 30	Montana State		Dornblaser Field; Missoula, MT (rivalry)	W 45–14	13,282	
November 6	at Portland State*		Civic Stadium; Portland, OR	L 28–35	2,556	
November 13	at Weber State		Wildcat Stadium; Ogden, UT	W 42–20	5,621	
November 20	at Oregon State*		Parker Stadium; Corvallis, OR	L 10–30	20,000	
November 27	at No. 11 Idaho*	No. 19	Kibbie Dome; Moscow, ID (NCAA Division I-AA First Round)	L 7–21	8,000	
*Non-conference game; Rankings from NCAA Division I-AA Football Committee Poll released prior to the game
