= 1989 Eastern Illinois Panthers football team =

American college football season

1989 Eastern Illinois Panthers football

NCAA Division I-AA Quarterfinal, L 19–25 vs. Montana
- Conference: Gateway Collegiate Athletic Conference
- Record: 9–4 (4–2 GCAC)
- Head coach: Bob Spoo (3rd season)
- Home stadium: O'Brien Stadium

1989 Gateway Collegiate Athletic Conference football standings
| | Conf. | | | | | Overall |
| Team | W | | L | | T | W | | L | | T |
|---|---|---|---|---|---|---|---|---|---|---|
| No. 9 Southwest Missouri State $^ | 5 | – | 1 | – | 0 | 10 | – | 3 | – | 0 |
| No. 15 Eastern Illinois ^ | 4 | – | 2 | – | 0 | 9 | – | 4 | – | 0 |
| No. 20 Northern Iowa | 4 | – | 2 | – | 0 | 8 | – | 3 | – | 0 |
| Illinois State | 4 | – | 2 | – | 0 | 5 | – | 6 | – | 0 |
| Indiana State | 2 | – | 4 | – | 0 | 4 | – | 7 | – | 0 |
| Western Illinois | 1 | – | 5 | – | 0 | 4 | – | 7 | – | 0 |
| Southern Illinois | 1 | – | 5 | – | 0 | 2 | – | 9 | – | 0 |
$ – Conference champion; ^ – NCAA Division I-AA playoff participant; Rankings from NCAA Division I-AA Football Committee poll

The 1989 Eastern Illinois Panthers football team represented Eastern Illinois University during the 1989 NCAA Division I-AA football season. The Panthers played their home games at O'Brien Stadium in Charleston, Illinois.

== Schedule ==
| Date | Opponent | Rank | Site | Result | Attendance | Source |
|---|---|---|---|---|---|---|
| September 2 | at Austin Peay* | | Municipal Stadium; Clarksville, TN | W 36–0 | 2,119 | |
| September 9 | Northwestern State* | No. T–6 | O'Brien Stadium; Charleston, IL | W 20–10 | 5,103 | |
| September 16 | at Southern Illinois | | McAndrew Stadium; Carbondale, IL | L 17–20 | 10,000 | |
| September 23 | Indiana State | | O'Brien Stadium; Charleston, IL | W 21–7 | | |
| September 30 | Illinois State | | O'Brien Stadium; Charleston, IL | W 14–13 | 6,100 | |
| October 7 | at Liberty* | No. 19 | City Stadium; Lynchburg, VA | L 7–9 | | |
| October 14 | Akron* | No. T–20 | O'Brien Stadium; Charleston, IL | W 21–17 | | |
| October 21 | Western Illinois | No. 19 | O'Brien Stadium; Charleston, IL | W 31–5 | | |
| October 28 | at Northern Iowa | No. 13 | UNI-Dome; Cedar Falls, IA | L 28–31 | 9,128 | |
| November 11 | No. 5 Southwest Missouri State | | O'Brien Stadium; Charleston, IL | W 16–15 | 10,128 | |
| November 18 | at No. 15 Western Kentucky* | No. 18 | L. T. Smith Stadium; Bowling Green, KY | W 10–7 | 4,000 | |
| November 25 | at No. T–4 Idaho* | No. 15 | Kibbie Dome; Moscow, ID (NCAA Division I-AA First Round) | W 38-21 | 6,025 | |
| December 2 | at No. 6 Montana* | No. 15 | Washington–Grizzly Stadium; Missoula, MT (NCAA Division I-AA Quarterfinal) | L 19–25 | 12,285 | |
*Non-conference game; Rankings from NCAA Division I-AA Football Committee Poll released prior to the game
