= 1982 Fresno State Bulldogs football team =

American college football season

1982 Fresno State Bulldogs football

PCAA champion California Bowl champion

California Bowl, W 29–28 vs. Bowling Green
- Conference: Pacific Coast Athletic Association
- Record: 11–1 (6–0 PCAA)
- Head coach: Jim Sweeney (5th season)
- Home stadium: Bulldog Stadium

1982 Pacific Coast Athletic Association football standings
	Conf.					Overall
Team	W		L		T	W		L		T
Fresno State $	6	–	0	–	0	11	–	1	–	0
Long Beach State	5	–	1	–	0	6	–	5	–	0
San Jose State	4	–	2	–	0	8	–	3	–	0
Utah State	2	–	3	–	0	5	–	6	–	0
Pacific (CA)	2	–	4	–	0	2	–	9	–	0
UNLV	1	–	4	–	0	3	–	8	–	0
Cal State Fullerton	0	–	6	–	0	3	–	9	–	0
$ – Conference champion

The 1982 Fresno State Bulldogs football team represented California State University, Fresno as a member of the Pacific Coast Athletic Association (PCAA) during the 1982 NCAA Division I-A football season. Led by fifth-year head coach Jim Sweeney, Fresno State compiled an overall record of 11–1 with a mark of 6–0 in conference play, winning the PCAA title. The Bulldogs played their home games at Bulldog Stadium in Fresno, California.

Fresno State earned their first NCAA Division I-A postseason bowl game berth in 1982. They played Bowling Green in the second annual California Bowl at their own stadium on December 18, winning 29–28.

== Schedule ==
Date	Time	Opponent	Site	Result	Attendance	Source
September 11		Cal Poly*	Bulldog Stadium; Fresno, CA	W 26–6	26,274	
September 18		at Oregon*	Autzen Stadium; Eugene, OR	W 10–4	19,836	
September 25		Weber State*	Bulldog Stadium; Fresno, CA	W 25–9	26,892	
October 2		Utah State	Bulldog Stadium; Fresno, CA	W 31–6	25,174	
October 9	7:30 p.m.	Pacific (CA)	Bulldog Stadium; Fresno, CA	W 49–30	25,574	
October 16		at Nevada*	Mackay Stadium; Reno, NV	L 26–40	9,077	
October 23	7:04 p.m.	at San Jose State	Spartan Stadium; San Jose, CA (rivalry)	W 39–27	21,302	
October 30	1:33 p.m.	Long Beach State	Bulldog Stadium; Fresno, CA	W 40–22	24,333	
November 6		Cal State Fullerton	Bulldog Stadium; Fresno, CA	W 31–14	22,620	
November 13		Montana State*	Bulldog Stadium; Fresno, CA	W 45–14	18,024	
November 20		at UNLV	Las Vegas Silver Bowl; Whitney, NV	W 30–28	15,528	
December 18		Bowling Green*	Bulldog Stadium; Fresno, CA (California Bowl)	W 29–28	30,000	
*Non-conference game; All times are in Pacific time

== Roster ==
- WR Henry Ellard
- WR Stephone Paige
- RB Eric Redwood
- QB Jeff Tedford
- DB Tim Washington
- RB Ken Williams

== Team players in the NFL ==
The following were selected in the 1983 NFL draft.

Player	Position	Round	Overall	NFL team
Henry Ellard	Wide receiver	2	32	Los Angeles Rams
Tim Washington	Defensive back	12	334	San Francisco 49ers

The following finished their college career in 1982, were not drafted, but played in the NFL.

Player	Position	First NFL team
Stephone Paige	Wide receiver	1983 Kansas City Chiefs
