= 1989 Nevada Wolf Pack football team =

American college football season

1989 Nevada Wolf Pack football
- Conference: Big Sky Conference
- Record: 7–4 (5–3 Big Sky)
- Head coach: Chris Ault (14th season)
- Home stadium: Mackay Stadium

1989 Big Sky Conference football standings
	Conf.					Overall
Team	W		L		T	W		L		T
No. T–4 Idaho $^	8	–	0	–	0	9	–	3	–	0
No. 6 Montana ^	7	–	1	–	0	11	–	3	–	0
No. 19 Nevada	5	–	3	–	0	7	–	4	–	0
Boise State	5	–	3	–	0	6	–	5	–	0
Eastern Washington	4	–	4	–	0	4	–	6	–	0
Northern Arizona	2	–	6	–	0	3	–	8	–	0
Montana State	2	–	6	–	0	4	–	7	–	0
Idaho State	2	–	6	–	0	3	–	7	–	0
Weber State	1	–	7	–	0	3	–	8	–	0
$ – Conference champion; ^ – NCAA Division I-AA playoff participant; Rankings from NCAA Division I-AA Poll

The 1989 Nevada Wolf Pack football team represented the University of Nevada, Reno during the 1989 NCAA Division I-AA football season. Nevada competed as a member of the Big Sky Conference (BSC). The Wolf Pack were led by 14th-year head coach Chris Ault and played their home games at Mackay Stadium.

== Schedule ==
Date	Opponent	Site	Result	Attendance	Source
September 2	Southern Illinois*	Mackay Stadium; Reno, NV	W 41–3	15,280	
September 9	at Eastern Washington	Joe Albi Stadium; Spokane, WA	L 7–33	3,900	
September 16	No. 15 (D-II) UC Davis*	Mackay Stadium; Reno, NV	L 17–24	13,320	
September 23	Idaho State	Mackay Stadium; Reno, NV	W 39–10	11,330	
October 7	Montana State	Mackay Stadium; Reno, NV	W 27–23	11,518	
October 14	at No. T–20 Montana	Washington–Grizzly Stadium; Missoula, MT	L 22–40	9,465	
October 21	Weber State^{†}	Mackay Stadium; Reno, NV	W 47–15	13,470	
October 28	at No. 9 Idaho	Kibbie Dome; Moscow, ID	L 22–42	15,500	
November 4	No. 13 Boise State	Mackay Stadium; Reno, NV (rivalry)	W 30–14	18,275	
November 11	UNLV*	Mackay Stadium; Reno, NV (Fremont Cannon)	W 45–7	16,545	
November 18	at Northern Arizona	Walkup Skydome; Flagstaff, AZ	W 52–45		
*Non-conference game; ^{†}Homecoming; Rankings from NCAA Division I-AA Football Committee Poll released prior to the game
