= 1982 Pacific Tigers football team =

American college football season

1982 Pacific Tigers football
- Conference: Pacific Coast Athletic Association
- Record: 2–9 (2–4 PCAA)
- Head coach: Bob Toledo (4th season)
- Home stadium: Pacific Memorial Stadium

1982 Pacific Coast Athletic Association football standings
| | Conf. | | | | | Overall |
| Team | W | | L | | T | W | | L | | T |
|---|---|---|---|---|---|---|---|---|---|---|
| Fresno State $ | 6 | – | 0 | – | 0 | 11 | – | 1 | – | 0 |
| Long Beach State | 5 | – | 1 | – | 0 | 6 | – | 5 | – | 0 |
| San Jose State | 4 | – | 2 | – | 0 | 8 | – | 3 | – | 0 |
| Utah State | 2 | – | 3 | – | 0 | 5 | – | 6 | – | 0 |
| Pacific (CA) | 2 | – | 4 | – | 0 | 2 | – | 9 | – | 0 |
| UNLV | 1 | – | 4 | – | 0 | 3 | – | 8 | – | 0 |
| Cal State Fullerton | 0 | – | 6 | – | 0 | 3 | – | 9 | – | 0 |
$ – Conference champion

The 1982 Pacific Tigers football team represented the University of the Pacific (UOP) in the 1982 NCAA Division I-A football season as a member of the Pacific Coast Athletic Association. (Note: The Big West Conference was known as the Pacific Coast Athletic Association from its founding in 1969 through 1987.)

Led by head coach Bob Toledo, in his fourth and final year, the Tigers played their home games at Pacific Memorial Stadium (Note: Amos Alonzo Stagg Memorial Stadium was known as Pacific Memorial Stadium from its opening in 1950 through 1987.) in Stockton, California. They finished the season with two wins and nine losses (2–9, 2–4 PCAA, fifth), and were outscored 200–330.

Toledo announced his resignation several days before the final game, a 31–0 home shutout win over Cal State Fullerton.

== Schedule ==
| Date | Time | Opponent | Site | Result | Attendance | Source |
|---|---|---|---|---|---|---|
| September 4 | 4:00 p.m. | at South Carolina* | Williams–Brice Stadium; Columbia, SC | L 6–41 | 61,254 | |
| September 11 | | UC Davis* | Pacific Memorial Stadium; Stockton, CA | L 22–23 | 16,988 | |
| September 18 | 7:30 p.m. | at Idaho* | Kibbie Dome; Moscow, ID | L 17–36 | 10,500 | |
| September 25 | | No. 7 Boise State* | Pacific Memorial Stadium; Stockton, CA | L 15–22 | 10,500 | |
| October 2 | 7:30 p.m. | UNLV | Pacific Memorial Stadium; Stockton, CA | W 29–27 | 9,500 | |
| October 9 | 7:30 p.m. | at Fresno State | Bulldog Stadium; Fresno, CA | L 30–49 | 25,574 | |
| October 16 | 12:30 p.m. | at Utah State | Romney Stadium; Logan, UT | L 12–14 | 10,026 | |
| October 23 | 6:30 p.m. | at Arizona* | Arizona Stadium; Tucson, AZ | L 7–55 | 45,800 | |
| November 6 | 7:35 p.m. | Long Beach State | Anaheim Stadium; Anaheim, CA | L 31–32 | 4,658 | |
| November 13 | 2:05 p.m. | San Jose State^{†} | Pacific Memorial Stadium; Stockton, CA (Victory Bell) | L 0–31 | 18,500 | |
| November 20 | | Cal State Fullerton | Pacific Memorial Stadium; Stockton, CA | W 31–0 | 4,000 | |
*Non-conference game; ^{†}Homecoming; Rankings from NCAA Division I-AA Football Committee Poll released prior to the game; All times are in Pacific time
