= 1989 Eastern Washington Eagles football team =

American college football season

1989 Eastern Washington Eagles football
- Conference: Big Sky Conference
- Record: 4–6 (4–4 Big Sky)
- Head coach: Dick Zornes (11th season)
- Home stadium: Joe Albi Stadium; Woodward Field

1989 Big Sky Conference football standings
	Conf.					Overall
Team	W		L		T	W		L		T
No. T–4 Idaho $^	8	–	0	–	0	9	–	3	–	0
No. 6 Montana ^	7	–	1	–	0	11	–	3	–	0
No. 19 Nevada	5	–	3	–	0	7	–	4	–	0
Boise State	5	–	3	–	0	6	–	5	–	0
Eastern Washington	4	–	4	–	0	4	–	6	–	0
Northern Arizona	2	–	6	–	0	3	–	8	–	0
Montana State	2	–	6	–	0	4	–	7	–	0
Idaho State	2	–	6	–	0	3	–	7	–	0
Weber State	1	–	7	–	0	3	–	8	–	0
$ – Conference champion; ^ – NCAA Division I-AA playoff participant; Rankings from NCAA Division I-AA Poll

The 1989 Eastern Washington Eagles football team was an American football team that represented Eastern Washington University as a member of the Big Sky Conference during the 1989 NCAA Division I-AA football season. Led by eleventh-year head coach Dick Zornes, the Eagles compiled an overall record of 4–6, with a mark of 4–4 in conference play, and finished fifth in the Big Sky.

== Schedule ==
Date	Opponent	Site	Result	Attendance	Source
September 9	Nevada	Joe Albi Stadium; Spokane, WA	W 33–7	3,900	
September 16	at Montana State	Sales Stadium; Bozeman, MT	L 3–28	8,000	
September 23	Montana	Joe Albi Stadium; Spokane, WA (rivalry)	L 16–22	7,365	
September 30	Northern Arizona	Joe Albi Stadium; Spokane, WA	W 20–14		
October 14	Idaho State^{†}	Woodward Field; Cheney, WA	W 45–26	5,009	
October 21	at No. 14 Idaho	Kibbie Dome; Moscow, ID	L 34–41	12,500	
October 28	No. 5 Stephen F. Austin*	Woodward Field; Cheney, WA	L 36–42		
November 4	at Weber State	Wildcat Stadium; Ogden, UT	W 27–10	3,509	
November 11	at Boise State	Bronco Stadium; Boise, ID	L 20–27	19,451	
November 18	at Northern Iowa*	UNI-Dome; Cedar Falls, IA	L 21–47	8,426	
*Non-conference game; ^{†}Homecoming; Rankings from NCAA Division I-AA Football Committee Poll released prior to the game
