= 1982 Weber State Wildcats football team =

American college football season

1982 Weber State Wildcats football
- Conference: Big Sky Conference
- Record: 4–7 (2–5 Big Sky)
- Head coach: Mike Price (2nd season)
- Defensive coordinator: Dave Campo (2nd season)
- Home stadium: Wildcat Stadium

1982 Big Sky Conference football standings
	Conf.					Overall
Team	W		L		T	W		L		T
No. 19 Montana $^	5	–	2	–	0	6	–	6	–	0
No. 11 Idaho ^	5	–	2	–	0	9	–	4	–	0
Montana State	5	–	2	–	0	6	–	5	–	0
No. 15 Boise State	4	–	3	–	0	8	–	3	–	0
Nevada	3	–	4	–	0	6	–	5	–	0
Northern Arizona	3	–	4	–	0	4	–	7	–	0
Weber State	2	–	5	–	0	4	–	7	–	0
Idaho State	1	–	6	–	0	3	–	8	–	0
$ – Conference champion; ^ – NCAA Division I-AA playoff participant; Rankings from NCAA Division I-AA Poll

The 1982 Weber State Wildcats football team represented Weber State College (now known as Weber State University) as a member of the Big Sky Conference during the 1982 NCAA Division I-AA football season. Led by second-year head coach Mike Price, the Wildcats compiled an overall record of 4–7, with a mark of 2–5 in conference play, and finished seventh in the Big Sky.

== Schedule ==
Date	Opponent	Site	Result	Attendance	Source
September 11	Eastern Washington*	Wildcat Stadium; Ogden, UT	W 27–24	12,107	
September 18	at Utah State*	Romney Stadium; Logan, UT	L 10–31	15,054	
September 25	at Fresno State*	Bulldog Stadium; Fresno, CA	L 9–25	26,892	
October 2	at Idaho	Kibbie Dome; Moscow, ID	L 34–35	15,000	
October 9	Montana State	Wildcat Stadium; Ogden, UT	L 20–23	10,320	
October 16	at Portland State*	Civic Stadium; Portland, OR	W 20–6	2,456	
October 23	at Boise State	Bronco Stadium; Boise, ID	L 21–41	17,750	
October 30	Idaho State	Wildcat Stadium; Ogden, UT	W 27–7	4,220	
November 6	Nevada	Wildcat Stadium; Ogden, UT	W 46–43 ^{3OT}	5,248	
November 13	Montana	Wildcat Stadium; Ogden, UT	L 20–42	5,621	
November 20	at Northern Arizona	Walkup Skydome; Flagstaff, AZ	L 28–35	7,369	
*Non-conference game
