= 1982 Montana State Bobcats football team =

American college football season

1982 Montana State Bobcats football

Big Sky co-champion
- Conference: Big Sky Conference
- Record: 6–5 (5–2 Big Sky)
- Head coach: Doug Graber (1st season)
- Home stadium: Sales Stadium

1982 Big Sky Conference football standings
	Conf.					Overall
Team	W		L		T	W		L		T
No. 19 Montana $^	5	–	2	–	0	6	–	6	–	0
No. 11 Idaho ^	5	–	2	–	0	9	–	4	–	0
Montana State	5	–	2	–	0	6	–	5	–	0
No. 15 Boise State	4	–	3	–	0	8	–	3	–	0
Nevada	3	–	4	–	0	6	–	5	–	0
Northern Arizona	3	–	4	–	0	4	–	7	–	0
Weber State	2	–	5	–	0	4	–	7	–	0
Idaho State	1	–	6	–	0	3	–	8	–	0
$ – Conference champion; ^ – NCAA Division I-AA playoff participant; Rankings from NCAA Division I-AA Poll

The 1982 Montana State Bobcats football team was an American football team that represented Montana State University in the Big Sky Conference during the 1982 NCAA Division I-AA football season. In their only season under head coach Doug Graber, the Bobcats compiled a 6–5 record, with their 5–2 record in the Big Sky Conference resulting in them tying for first.

== Schedule ==
Date	Opponent	Site	Result	Attendance	Source
September 4	at Utah*	Robert Rice Stadium; Salt Lake City, UT	L 12–30	27,623	
September 11	North Dakota*	Sales Stadium; Bozeman, MT	L 27–28	7,037	
September 18	Eastern Washington*	Sales Stadium; Bozeman, MT	W 24–20	7,007	
September 25	Nevada	Sales Stadium; Bozeman, MT	W 17–10	8,117	
October 2	Idaho State	Sales Stadium; Bozeman, MT	W 30–27	8,197	
October 9	at Weber State	Wildcat Stadium; Ogden, UT	W 23–20	10,320	
October 16	Boise State^{†}	Sales Stadium; Bozeman, MT	W 27–14	13,397	
October 23	at Idaho	Kibbie Dome; Moscow, ID	L 20–36	13,000	
October 30	at Montana	Dornblaser Field; Missoula, MT (rivalry)	L 14–45	13,282	
November 6	Northern Arizona	Sales Stadium; Bozeman, MT	W 32–19	5,097	
November 13	at Fresno State*	Bulldog Stadium; Fresno, CA	L 14–45	18,024	
*Non-conference game; ^{†}Homecoming
