= 1989 Northern Iowa Panthers football team =

American college football season

1989 Northern Iowa Panthers football
- Conference: Gateway Football Conference
- Record: 8–3 (4–2 Gateway)
- Head coach: Terry Allen (1st season)
- Defensive coordinator: Ardell Wiegandt (1st season)
- Home stadium: UNI-Dome

1989 Gateway Collegiate Athletic Conference football standings
	Conf.					Overall
Team	W		L		T	W		L		T
No. 9 Southwest Missouri State $^	5	–	1	–	0	10	–	3	–	0
No. 15 Eastern Illinois ^	4	–	2	–	0	9	–	4	–	0
No. 20 Northern Iowa	4	–	2	–	0	8	–	3	–	0
Illinois State	4	–	2	–	0	5	–	6	–	0
Indiana State	2	–	4	–	0	4	–	7	–	0
Western Illinois	1	–	5	–	0	4	–	7	–	0
Southern Illinois	1	–	5	–	0	2	–	9	–	0
$ – Conference champion; ^ – NCAA Division I-AA playoff participant; Rankings from NCAA Division I-AA Football Committee poll

The 1989 Northern Iowa Panthers football team was an American football team that represented the University of Northern Iowa as a member of the Gateway Football Conference (Gateway Conference) during the 1989 NCAA Division I-AA football season. In its first season under head coach Terry Allen, the team compiled an 8–3 record (4–2 in conference games) and finished in a three-way tie for second place in the Gateway Conference.

Four Northern Iowa players were honored as first-team players on the 1989 all-Gateway football team: wide receiver Milo Popovic; kicker Brian Mitchell; defensive tackle James Jones; and linebacker Bryce Paup. Two others were named to the second team. Paup had 84 unassisted tackles. Popovic had 28 kick returns for 604 yards and 38 punt returns for 525 yards and an average of 152.0 all-purpose yards per game.

The team played its home games at the UNI-Dome in Cedar Falls, Iowa.

== Schedule ==
Date	Time	Opponent	Rank	Site	Result	Attendance	Source
September 2	7:00 p.m.	Mankato State*		UNI-Dome; Cedar Falls, IA	L 14–22	6,827	
September 16	6:10 p.m.	at Kansas State*		KSU Stadium; Manhattan, KS	W 10–8	28,275	
September 23	7:00 p.m.	Fort Hays State*		UNI-Dome; Cedar Falls, IA	W 43–15	13,167	
September 30	1:30 p.m.	at No. T–5 Southwest Missouri State		Briggs Stadium; Springfield, MO	L 22–37	7,512	
October 7	1:30 p.m.	at Western Illinois		Hanson Field; Macomb, IL	W 21–10	9,121	
October 14	1:30 p.m.	at Indiana State		Memorial Stadium; Terre Haute, IN	W 24–21	8,129	
October 21	1:30 p.m.	Ferris State*^{†}		UNI-Dome; Cedar Falls, IA	W 39–3	10,614	
October 28	7:00 p.m.	at No. 13 Eastern Illinois		O'Brien Field; Charleston, IL	W 31–28	9,128	
November 4	1:30 p.m.	at Illinois State	No. 17	Hancock Stadium; Normal, IL	L 13–32	7,295	
November 11	7:00 p.m.	Southern Illinois		UNI-Dome; Cedar Falls, IA	W 38–14	7,827	
November 18	7:00 p.m.	Eastern Washington*		UNI-Dome; Cedar Falls, IA	W 47–21	8,426	
*Non-conference game; ^{†}Homecoming; Rankings from NCAA Division I-AA Football Committee Poll released prior to the game; All times are in Central time

== Roster ==
1989 Northern Iowa Panthers football team roster
Players
Coaches
Offense

Pos.	#	Name	Class
QB		Jay Johnson	Fr
QB	13	Kurt Warner	Fr

Defense

Pos.	#	Name	Class
CB	12	Willie Beamon	Fr
DE	96	James Jones	Jr
DB	9	Chris Klieman	Jr
LB	55	Bryce Paup	Sr

Special teams

Pos.	#	Name	Class

Head coach

- Terry Allen

Coordinators/assistant coaches

- Ardell Wiegandt (Defensive coordinator)
- Mark Farley (Linebackers)
- Jay Norvell (Wide receivers)

Legend

- (C) Team captain
- (S) Suspended
- (I) Ineligible
- Injured
- Redshirt

== NFL draft ==
Player	Position	Round	Pick	NFL club
Bryce Paup	Linebacker	6	159	Green Bay Packers

- Redshirted quarterback Kurt Warner would go on to an NFL career in which he played for the St. Louis Rams, New York Giants, and Arizona Cardinals.
