= 1989 Montana Grizzlies football team =

American college football season

1989 Montana Grizzlies football

NCAA Division I-AA Semifinal, L 15–45 vs. Georgia Southern
- Conference: Big Sky Conference
- Record: 11–3 (7–1 Big Sky)
- Head coach: Don Read (4th season)
- Offensive coordinator: Tommy Lee (4th season)
- Home stadium: Washington–Grizzly Stadium

1989 Big Sky Conference football standings
	Conf.					Overall
Team	W		L		T	W		L		T
No. T–4 Idaho $^	8	–	0	–	0	9	–	3	–	0
No. 6 Montana ^	7	–	1	–	0	11	–	3	–	0
No. 19 Nevada	5	–	3	–	0	7	–	4	–	0
Boise State	5	–	3	–	0	6	–	5	–	0
Eastern Washington	4	–	4	–	0	4	–	6	–	0
Northern Arizona	2	–	6	–	0	3	–	8	–	0
Montana State	2	–	6	–	0	4	–	7	–	0
Idaho State	2	–	6	–	0	3	–	7	–	0
Weber State	1	–	7	–	0	3	–	8	–	0
$ – Conference champion; ^ – NCAA Division I-AA playoff participant; Rankings from NCAA Division I-AA Poll

The 1989 Montana Grizzlies football team represented the University of Montana in the 1989 NCAA Division I-AA football season as a member of the Big Sky Conference. The Grizzlies were led by fourth-year head coach Don Read, played their home games at Washington–Grizzly Stadium and finished the season with a record of eleven wins and three losses (11–3, 7–1 Big Sky).

== Schedule ==
Date	Opponent	Rank	Site	Result	Attendance	Source
September 2	Eastern New Mexico*		Washington–Grizzly Stadium; Missoula, MT	W 41–15	7,614	
September 9	at Fresno State*		Bulldog Stadium; Fresno, CA	L 37–52	33,710	
September 16	No. 3 (D-II) Portland State*		Washington–Grizzly Stadium; Missoula, MT	W 30–21	10,155	
September 23	at Eastern Washington		Joe Albi Stadium; Spokane, WA (rivalry)	W 22–16	7,365	
September 28	at Idaho		Kibbie Dome; Moscow, ID (rivalry)	L 24–30	13,000	
October 7	Weber State		Washington–Grizzly Stadium; Missoula, MT	W 31–6	13,589	
October 14	Nevada	No. T–20	Washington–Grizzly Stadium; Missoula, MT	W 40–22	9,465	
October 21	at Northern Arizona	No. 20	Walkup Skydome; Flagstaff, AZ	W 38–14	8,520	
October 28	No. 6 Boise State	No. 14	Washington–Grizzly Stadium; Missoula, MT	W 48–13	10,388	
November 4	at Montana State	No. 9	Reno H. Sales Stadium; Bozeman, MT (rivalry)	W 17–2	14,227	
November 11	Idaho State	No. 8	Washington–Grizzly Stadium; Missoula, MT	W 35–21	9,021	
November 25	No. 17 Jackson State*	No. 6	Washington–Grizzly Stadium; Missoula, MT (Division I-AA First Round)	W 48–7	11,854	
December 2	No. 15 Eastern Illinois*	No. 6	Washington–Grizzly Stadium; Missoula, MT (NCAA Division I-AA Quarterfinal)	W 25–19	12,285	
December 9	at No. 1 Georgia Southern*	No. 6	Paulson Stadium; Statesboro, GA (NCAA Division I-AA Semifinal)	L 15–45	10,421	
*Non-conference game; Rankings from NCAA Division I-AA Football Committee Poll released prior to the game
