= 1982 Northern Arizona Lumberjacks football team =

American college football season

1982 Northern Arizona Lumberjacks football
- Conference: Big Sky Conference
- Record: 4–7 (3–4 Big Sky)
- Head coach: Joe Harper (1st season)
- Offensive coordinator: Marijon Ancich (1st season)
- Home stadium: Walkup Skydome

1982 Big Sky Conference football standings
	Conf.					Overall
Team	W		L		T	W		L		T
No. 19 Montana $^	5	–	2	–	0	6	–	6	–	0
No. 11 Idaho ^	5	–	2	–	0	9	–	4	–	0
Montana State	5	–	2	–	0	6	–	5	–	0
No. 15 Boise State	4	–	3	–	0	8	–	3	–	0
Nevada	3	–	4	–	0	6	–	5	–	0
Northern Arizona	3	–	4	–	0	4	–	7	–	0
Weber State	2	–	5	–	0	4	–	7	–	0
Idaho State	1	–	6	–	0	3	–	8	–	0
$ – Conference champion; ^ – NCAA Division I-AA playoff participant; Rankings from NCAA Division I-AA Poll

The 1982 Northern Arizona Lumberjacks football team represented Northern Arizona University as a member of the Big Sky Conference during the 1982 NCAA Division I-AA football season. Led by first-year head coach Joe Harper, the Lumberjacks compiled an overall record of 4–7, with a mark of 3–4 in conference play, and finished tied for fifth in the Big Sky.

== Schedule ==
Date	Opponent	Site	Result	Attendance	Source
September 4	at Cal State Fullerton*	Titan Field; Fullerton, CA	L 15–19	6,000	
September 11	Southern Utah*	Walkup Skydome; Flagstaff, AZ	W 36–15	8,523	
September 25	at Montana	Dornblaser Field; Missoula, MT	L 35–36	8,521	
October 2	No. 6 Boise State	Walkup Skydome; Flagstaff, AZ	W 30–14	13,869	
October 9	at Nevada	Mackay Stadium; Reno, NV	L 12–24	9,352	
October 16	Idaho State	Walkup Skydome; Flagstaff, AZ	W 18–16	7,586	
October 23	Eastern Washington*	Walkup Skydome; Flagstaff, AZ	L 7–14	10,875	
October 30	at New Mexico State*	Aggie Memorial Stadium; Las Cruces, NM	L 32–34	14,312	
November 6	at Montana State	Sales Stadium; Bozeman, MT	L 19–32	5,097	
November 13	at No. 10 Idaho	Kibbie Dome; Moscow, ID	L 37–55	13,000	
November 20	Weber State	Walkup Skydome; Flagstaff, AZ	W 35–28	7,369	
*Non-conference game; Rankings from NCAA Division I-AA Football Committee Poll released prior to the game
