= 1989 Idaho Vandals football team =

American college football season

1989 Idaho Vandals football

Big Sky champion

NCAA Division I-AA First Round, L 21–38 vs. Eastern Illinois
- Conference: Big Sky Conference

Ranking
- AP: No. T-4
- Record: 9–3 (8–0 Big Sky)
- Head coach: John L. Smith (1st season)
- Offensive coordinator: Dan Cozzetto (1st season)
- Defensive coordinator: Gordon Shaw (1st season)
- Home stadium: Kibbie Dome

1989 Big Sky Conference football standings
	Conf.					Overall
Team	W		L		T	W		L		T
No. T–4 Idaho $^	8	–	0	–	0	9	–	3	–	0
No. 6 Montana ^	7	–	1	–	0	11	–	3	–	0
No. 19 Nevada	5	–	3	–	0	7	–	4	–	0
Boise State	5	–	3	–	0	6	–	5	–	0
Eastern Washington	4	–	4	–	0	4	–	6	–	0
Northern Arizona	2	–	6	–	0	3	–	8	–	0
Montana State	2	–	6	–	0	4	–	7	–	0
Idaho State	2	–	6	–	0	3	–	7	–	0
Weber State	1	–	7	–	0	3	–	8	–	0
$ – Conference champion; ^ – NCAA Division I-AA playoff participant; Rankings from NCAA Division I-AA Poll

The 1989 Idaho Vandals football team represented the University of Idaho in the 1989 NCAA Division I-AA football season. The Vandals, led by first-year head coach John L. Smith, were members of the Big Sky Conference and played their home games at the Kibbie Dome, an indoor facility on campus in Moscow, Idaho.

The Vandals won their third consecutive conference title (fourth in five years), and made the I-AA playoffs for the fifth consecutive season, under a third head coach. Led by senior All-American quarterback John Friesz, Idaho finished the regular season at 9–2 and 8–0 in the Big Sky.

Hired in early January, Smith had been the defensive coordinator and assistant head coach at Idaho for four seasons (1982–85), all under Dennis Erickson, then went with him in the same capacity to Wyoming and Washington State.

== Notable games ==
Following two non-conference road losses to open the season at Washington State and Portland State, the Vandals won nine straight, which included an undefeated conference record of 8–0. It was the only time in school history that the football team has posted an unblemished conference record.

The Vandals defeated Montana, their only conference loss the previous season, on a Thursday night in the Kibbie Dome in late September, televised by ESPN. Idaho beat Nevada for the third straight year, only the fourth time in the twelve meetings since the Wolf Pack joined the Big Sky in 1979. The Vandals defeated rival Boise State for the eighth consecutive year, the eighth of twelve straight over the Broncos before a record crowd of 17,600 in the Kibbie Dome.

== Division I-AA playoffs ==
For the fifth consecutive season, Idaho returned to the 16-team I-AA playoffs. The Vandals, on a nine-game winning streak, hosted Eastern Illinois at home but lost 21–38. The game was played before a sparse crowd at the Kibbie Dome two days after Thanksgiving and ended the Vandals' season at 9–3.

== Notable players ==
The 1989 team included John Friesz, a future collegiate hall of fame quarterback as a three-year starter (1987–89). Friesz was the winner of the Walter Payton Award in 1989, and was selected by the San Diego Chargers in the 1990 NFL draft. He was in the NFL for the next decade with four teams.

== Schedule ==
Date	Time	Opponent	Rank	Site	TV	Result	Attendance	Source
September 2	2:00 pm	at Washington State*	No. 6	Martin Stadium; Pullman, WA (Battle of the Palouse)		L 7–41	33,914	
September 9	7:00 pm	at No. 3 (D-II) Portland State*	No. 6	Civic Stadium; Portland, OR		L 20–29	13,359	
September 16	7:00 pm	No. 5 (D-II) Sacramento State*		Kibbie Dome; Moscow, ID		W 45–3	9,100	
September 23	6:00 pm	at Weber State		Wildcat Stadium; Ogden, UT		W 46–33		
September 28	5:00 pm	Montana		Kibbie Dome; Moscow, ID (Little Brown Stein)	ESPN	W 30–24	13,000	
October 7	3:00 pm	at Northern Arizona	No. 20	Walkup Skydome; Flagstaff, AZ		W 41–31	10,842	
October 14	1:00 pm	at Montana State	No. 15	Reno H. Sales Stadium; Bozeman, MT		W 41–7	11,187	
October 21	1:00 pm	Eastern Washington	No. 14	Kibbie Dome; Moscow, ID		W 41–34	12,500	
October 28	1:00 pm	Nevada^{†}	No. 9	Kibbie Dome; Moscow, ID		W 42–22	15,500	
November 4	6:30 pm	at Idaho State	No. 7	Holt Arena; Pocatello, ID (rivalry)		W 47–31	10,380	
November 18	7:00 pm	No. 20 Boise State	No. 5	Kibbie Dome; Moscow, ID (rivalry)		W 26–21	17,600	
November 25	1:00 pm	No. 15 Eastern Illinois*	No. 4	Kibbie Dome; Moscow, ID (NCAA Division I-AA First Round)		L 21–38	6,025	
*Non-conference game; ^{†}Homecoming; Rankings from NCAA Division I-AA Football Committee Poll released prior to the game; All times are in Pacific time

== Roster ==
1989 Idaho Vandals football team roster
Players
Coaches
Offense

Pos.	#	Name	Class
QB		Pat West
QB		Steve Nolan	Jr
QB	13	Doug Nussmeier	Fr
WR	16	Lee Allen	Sr
QB	17	John Friesz	Sr
FL	25	David Jackson	So
RB	26	Devon Pearce	So
WR	30	Kasey Dunn	So
FL		Michael Davis	Sr
G	50	Mike Rice	Jr
G	54	Floyd Dorry	Fr
C	53	Steve Unger	Sr
OT	62	Shawen Smith	So
OT	63	Troy Wright	Jr
G	66	Chris Hoff	Jr
OT		Todd Neu	Sr
TE	84	Scott Dahlquist	Jr

Defense

Pos.	#	Name	Class
SS	3	Brian Smith	Sr
FS	22	Kris McCall	So
CB	23	Charlie Oliver	Jr
CB	33	Terry Green	So
LB	39	Jimmy Jacobs	Jr
LB	43	Roger Cecil	Jr
LB	58	John Rust	Jr
DT	59	John Sirmon	Fr
DT	74	Vince Mann	So
DE	87	Jeff Robinson	Fr
DE	93	Mike Zeller	Sr
DE	97	Brian Cockrell	Fr

Special teams

Pos.	#	Name	Class
K	14	Thane Doyle	So

Head coach

- John L. Smith (1st year)

Coordinators/assistant coaches

- Dan Cozzetto (OC)
- Gordon Shaw (DC)
- Bobby Petrino (QB)
- Mike Cox (LB)

Legend

- (C) Team captain
- (S) Suspended
- (I) Ineligible
- Injured
- Redshirt

== All-conference ==
Quarterback John Friesz was named to the all-conference team for a third consecutive year. He was joined by center Steve Unger, guard Troy Wright, wide receiver Lee Allen, defensive end Mike Zeller, linebacker Roger Cecil, and cornerback Charlie Oliver. Second team selections included wide receiver Kasey Dunn, tackles Todd Neu and Chuck Yarbro, linebacker John Rust, and safety Brian Smith.

Friesz was the Big Sky's outstanding offensive player for a third straight year, repeated as a first-team Kodak All-American in Division I-AA, and won the Walter Payton Award.

== NFL draft ==
One Vandal senior was selected in the 1990 NFL draft, which lasted twelve rounds (332 selections).

Player	Position	Round	Overall	Franchise
John Friesz	QB	6th	138	San Diego Chargers
