= 1989 Southwest Missouri State Bears football team =

American college football season

1989 Southwest Missouri State Bears football

GFC champion

NCAA Division I-AA Quarterfinal, L 25–55 at Stephen F. Austin
- Conference: Gateway Football Conference
- Record: 10–3 (5–1 GFC)
- Head coach: Jesse Branch (4th season)
- Defensive coordinator: Dave Wommack (4th season)
- Captains: Mark Christiansen; Tony Gilbert; Craig Phillips
- Home stadium: Briggs Stadium

1989 Gateway Collegiate Athletic Conference football standings
| | Conf. | | | | | Overall |
| Team | W | | L | | T | W | | L | | T |
|---|---|---|---|---|---|---|---|---|---|---|
| No. 9 Southwest Missouri State $^ | 5 | – | 1 | – | 0 | 10 | – | 3 | – | 0 |
| No. 15 Eastern Illinois ^ | 4 | – | 2 | – | 0 | 9 | – | 4 | – | 0 |
| No. 20 Northern Iowa | 4 | – | 2 | – | 0 | 8 | – | 3 | – | 0 |
| Illinois State | 4 | – | 2 | – | 0 | 5 | – | 6 | – | 0 |
| Indiana State | 2 | – | 4 | – | 0 | 4 | – | 7 | – | 0 |
| Western Illinois | 1 | – | 5 | – | 0 | 4 | – | 7 | – | 0 |
| Southern Illinois | 1 | – | 5 | – | 0 | 2 | – | 9 | – | 0 |
$ – Conference champion; ^ – NCAA Division I-AA playoff participant; Rankings from NCAA Division I-AA Football Committee poll

The 1989 Southwest Missouri State Bears football team represented Southwest Missouri State University (now known as Missouri State University) as a member of the Gateway Football Conference (GFC) during the 1989 NCAA Division I-AA football season. Led by fourth-year head coach Jesse Branch, the Bears compiled an overall record of 10–3, with a mark of 5–1 in conference play, and finished as GFC champion. Southwest Missouri State advanced to the NCAA Division I-AA Quarterfinals and were defeated by Stephen F. Austin.

== Schedule ==
| Date | Time | Opponent | Rank | Site | Result | Attendance | Source |
|---|---|---|---|---|---|---|---|
| September 2 | | Northwestern State* | | Briggs Stadium; Springfield, MO | W 20–10 | | |
| September 9 | | Indiana State | | Briggs Stadium; Springfield, MO | W 31–10 | | |
| September 16 | | at Western Illinois | | Hanson Field; Macomb, IL | W 31–24 | | |
| September 23 | | at Austin Peay* | No. T–5 | Municipal Stadium; Clarksville, TN | W 41–3 | 2,493 | |
| September 30 | 1:30 p.m. | Northern Iowa | No. T–5 | Briggs Stadium; Springfield, MO | W 37–22 | 7,512 | |
| October 7 | | Illinois State | No. T–5 | Briggs Stadium; Springfield, MO | W 42–7 | 9,000 | |
| October 14 | | at Western Kentucky* | No. 4 | L. T. Smith Stadium; Bowling Green, KY | L 33–42 | 9,000 | |
| October 21 | | at Southern Illinois | No. 8 | McAndrew Stadium; Carbondale, IL | W 31–25 | 10,000 | |
| October 28 | | No. 20 Alcorn State* | No. 7 | Briggs Stadium; Springfield, MO | W 59–19 | 9,148 | |
| November 11 | | at Eastern Illinois | No. 5 | O'Brien Stadium; Charleston, IL | L 15–16 | 10,128 | |
| November 18 | | at Liberty* | No. 9 | Willard May Stadium; Lynchburg, VA | W 31–20 | | |
| November 25 | | No. 8 Maine* | No. 9 | Briggs Stadium; Springfield, MO (NCAA Division I-AA First Round) | W 38–35 | 7,270 | |
| December 2 | | at No. 3 Stephen F. Austin* | No. 9 | Homer Bryce Stadium; Nacogdoches, TX (NCAA Division I-AA Quarterfinal) | L 25–55 | | |
*Non-conference game; Rankings from NCAA Division I-AA Football Committee Poll released prior to the game; All times are in Central time
