= 1989 Western Illinois Leathernecks football team =

American college football season

1989 Western Illinois Leathernecks football
- Conference: Gateway Collegiate Athletic Conference
- Record: 4–7 (1–5 GCAC)
- Head coach: Bruce Craddock (7th season)
- Home stadium: Hanson Field

1989 Gateway Collegiate Athletic Conference football standings
	Conf.					Overall
Team	W		L		T	W		L		T
No. 9 Southwest Missouri State $^	5	–	1	–	0	10	–	3	–	0
No. 15 Eastern Illinois ^	4	–	2	–	0	9	–	4	–	0
No. 20 Northern Iowa	4	–	2	–	0	8	–	3	–	0
Illinois State	4	–	2	–	0	5	–	6	–	0
Indiana State	2	–	4	–	0	4	–	7	–	0
Western Illinois	1	–	5	–	0	4	–	7	–	0
Southern Illinois	1	–	5	–	0	2	–	9	–	0
$ – Conference champion; ^ – NCAA Division I-AA playoff participant; Rankings from NCAA Division I-AA Football Committee poll

The 1989 Western Illinois Leathernecks football team represented Western Illinois University as a member of the Gateway Collegiate Athletic Conference (GCAC) during the 1989 NCAA Division I-AA football season. The team was led by seventh-year head coach Bruce Craddock and played their home games at Hanson Field in Macomb, Illinois. The Leathernecks finished the season with a 4–7 record overall and a 1–5 record in conference play.

== Schedule ==
Date	Opponent	Site	Result	Attendance	Source
September 2	Arkansas–Monticello*	Hanson Field; Macomb, IL	W 24–10		
September 10	at Southern Illinois	McAndrew Stadium; Carbondale, IL	W 14–7	3,000	
September 16	Southwest Missouri State	Hanson Field; Macomb, IL	L 24–31		
September 23	Delaware State*	Hanson Field; Macomb, IL	W 38–24		
September 30	at Northern Illinois*	Huskie Stadium; DeKalb, IL	L 27–34	22,365	
October 7	Northern Iowa	Hanson Field; Macomb, IL	L 10–21	9,121	
October 14	Fort Hays State*	Hanson Field; Macomb, IL	W 43–0		
October 21	at No. 19 Eastern Illinois	O'Brien Stadium; Charleston, IL	L 5–31		
October 28	at Illinois State	Hancock Stadium; Normal, IL	L 6–30		
November 4	at Portland State*	Civic Stadium; Portland, OR	L 7–14		
November 11	Indiana State	Hanson Field; Macomb, IL	L 7–13	7,631	
*Non-conference game; Rankings from NCAA Division I-AA Football Committee Poll released prior to the game
