= 1989 Montana State Bobcats football team =

American college football season

1989 Montana State Bobcats football
- Conference: Big Sky Conference
- Record: 4–7 (2–6 Big Sky)
- Head coach: Earle Solomonson (3rd season)
- Home stadium: Sales Stadium

1989 Big Sky Conference football standings
	Conf.					Overall
Team	W		L		T	W		L		T
No. T–4 Idaho $^	8	–	0	–	0	9	–	3	–	0
No. 6 Montana ^	7	–	1	–	0	11	–	3	–	0
No. 19 Nevada	5	–	3	–	0	7	–	4	–	0
Boise State	5	–	3	–	0	6	–	5	–	0
Eastern Washington	4	–	4	–	0	4	–	6	–	0
Northern Arizona	2	–	6	–	0	3	–	8	–	0
Montana State	2	–	6	–	0	4	–	7	–	0
Idaho State	2	–	6	–	0	3	–	7	–	0
Weber State	1	–	7	–	0	3	–	8	–	0
$ – Conference champion; ^ – NCAA Division I-AA playoff participant; Rankings from NCAA Division I-AA Poll

The 1989 Montana State Bobcats football team was an American football team that represented Montana State University in the Big Sky Conference during the 1989 NCAA Division I-AA football season. In their third season under head coach Earle Solomonson, the Bobcats compiled a 4–7 record (2–6 against Big Sky opponents) and tied for sixth place in the Big Sky.

== Schedule ==
Date	Opponent	Site	Result	Attendance	Source
September 2	at Kansas*	Memorial Stadium; Lawrence, KS	L 17–41	37,500	
September 9	at Sam Houston State*	Bowers Stadium; Huntsville, TX	W 15–10	10,150	
September 16	Eastern Washington	Sales Stadium; Bozeman, MT	W 28–3	8,000	
September 23	New Mexico Highlands*	Sales Stadium; Bozeman, MT	W 51–12	9,000	
September 30	at Idaho State	Holt Arena; Pocatello, ID	L 21–23	8,250	
October 7	at Nevada	Mackay Stadium; Reno, NV	L 23–27	11,518	
October 14	No. 15 Idaho^{†}	Sales Stadium; Bozeman, MT	L 7–41	11,187	
October 21	at No. 7 Boise State	Bronco Stadium; Boise, ID	L 10–37	19,241	
October 28	Weber State	Sales Stadium; Bozeman, MT	W 31–27	3,107	
November 4	No. 9 Montana	Sales Stadium; Bozeman, MT (rivalry)	L 2–17	14,227	
November 11	at Northern Arizona	Walkup Skydome; Flagstaff, AZ	L 31–35		
*Non-conference game; ^{†}Homecoming; Rankings from NCAA Division I-AA Football Committee Poll released prior to the game
