= 1989 Illinois State Redbirds football team =

American college football season

1989 Illinois State Redbirds football
- Conference: Gateway Collegiate Athletic Conference
- Record: 5–6 (4–2 GCAC)
- Head coach: Jim Heacock (2nd season)
- Home stadium: Hancock Stadium

1989 Gateway Collegiate Athletic Conference football standings
	Conf.					Overall
Team	W		L		T	W		L		T
No. 9 Southwest Missouri State $^	5	–	1	–	0	10	–	3	–	0
No. 15 Eastern Illinois ^	4	–	2	–	0	9	–	4	–	0
No. 20 Northern Iowa	4	–	2	–	0	8	–	3	–	0
Illinois State	4	–	2	–	0	5	–	6	–	0
Indiana State	2	–	4	–	0	4	–	7	–	0
Western Illinois	1	–	5	–	0	4	–	7	–	0
Southern Illinois	1	–	5	–	0	2	–	9	–	0
$ – Conference champion; ^ – NCAA Division I-AA playoff participant; Rankings from NCAA Division I-AA Football Committee poll

The 1989 Illinois State Redbirds football team represented Illinois State University as a member of the Gateway Collegiate Athletic Conference (GCAC) during the 1989 NCAA Division I-AA football season. In their second year under head coach Jim Heacock, the Redbirds compiled an overall record of 5–6, with a mark of 4–2 in conference play, and finished tied for second in the GCAC. Illinois State played home games at Hancock Stadium in Normal, Illinois.

== Schedule ==
Date	Opponent	Site	Result	Attendance	Source
September 2	Western Kentucky*	Hancock Stadium; Normal, IL	L 12–17	4,452	
September 9	Central State (OH)*	Hancock Stadium; Normal, IL	W 10–9	7,489	
September 23	at East Carolina*	Ficklen Memorial Stadium; Greenville, NC	L 10–56	30,245	
September 23	at Eastern Illinois	O'Brien Stadium; Charleston, IL	L 7–21		
October 7	at No. T–5 Southwest Missouri State	Briggs Stadium; Springfield, MO	L 7–42	9,000	
October 14	at Southern Illinois	McAndrew Stadium; Carbondale, IL	W 21–17	12,000	
October 21	Indiana State	Hancock Stadium; Normal, IL	W 15–13	9,275	
October 28	Western Illinois	Hancock Stadium; Normal, IL	W 30–6		
November 4	No. 17 Northern Iowa	Hancock Stadium; Normal, IL	W 31–13	7,295	
November 11	Arkansas State*	Hancock Stadium; Normal, IL	L 12–21	10,851	
November 18	at Nicholls State*	John L. Guidry Stadium; Thibodaux, LA	L 28–32		
*Non-conference game; Rankings from NCAA Division I-AA Football Committee Poll released prior to the game
