= 1982 UNLV Rebels football team =

American college football season

1982 UNLV Rebels football
- Conference: Pacific Coast Athletic Association
- Record: 3–8 (1–4 PCAA)
- Head coach: Harvey Hyde (1st season)
- Home stadium: Las Vegas Silver Bowl

1982 Pacific Coast Athletic Association football standings
	Conf.					Overall
Team	W		L		T	W		L		T
Fresno State $	6	–	0	–	0	11	–	1	–	0
Long Beach State	5	–	1	–	0	6	–	5	–	0
San Jose State	4	–	2	–	0	8	–	3	–	0
Utah State	2	–	3	–	0	5	–	6	–	0
Pacific (CA)	2	–	4	–	0	2	–	9	–	0
UNLV	1	–	4	–	0	3	–	8	–	0
Cal State Fullerton	0	–	6	–	0	3	–	9	–	0
$ – Conference champion

The 1982 UNLV Rebels football team was an American football team that represented the University of Nevada, Las Vegas (UNLV) as a member of the Pacific Coast Athletic Association (PCAA) during the 1982 NCAA Division I-A football season. In their first year under head coach Harvey Hyde, the Rebels compiled am overall record of 3–8 record with a mark of 1–4 in conference play, placing sixth in the PCAA. The team played home games at the Las Vegas Silver Bowl in Whitney, Nevada.

Hired in December 1981, Hyde was previously the head football coach at Pasadena City College. Formerly an independent, this was the Rebels' first season in the PCAA.

== Schedule ==
Date	Time	Opponent	Site	Result	Attendance	Source
September 2		BYU*	Las Vegas Silver Bowl; Whitney, NV	L 0–27	26,769	
September 18		at New Mexico*	University Stadium; Albuquerque, NM	L 21–49	20,197	
September 25		at San Diego State*	Jack Murphy Stadium; San Diego, CA	L 23–26	24,207	
October 2	7:30 p.m.	at Pacific (CA)	Pacific Memorial Stadium; Stockton, CA	L 27–29	9,500	
October 9		UTEP*	Las Vegas Silver Bowl; Whitney, NV	W 28–21	17,289	
October 16		at Utah*	Robert Rice Stadium; Salt Lake City, UT	L 14–24	26,182	
October 30	7:31 p.m.	San Jose State	Las Vegas Silver Bowl; Whitney, NV	L 14–48	13,487	
November 6		at Colorado State*	Hughes Stadium; Fort Collins, CO	W 36–31	19,108	
November 13	7:31 p.m.	at Long Beach State	Anaheim Stadium; Anaheim, CA	L 13–24	4,660	
November 20		Fresno State	Las Vegas Silver Bowl; Whitney, NV	L 28–30	15,528	
November 27		Cal State Fullerton	Las Vegas Silver Bowl; Whitney, NV	W 42–23	12,923	
*Non-conference game; All times are in Pacific time
