= 1989 Southern Illinois Salukis football team =

American college football season

1989 Southern Illinois Salukis football
- Conference: Gateway Collegiate Athletic Conference
- Record: 2–9 (1–5 GCAC)
- Head coach: Bob Smith (1st season)
- Home stadium: McAndrew Stadium

1989 Gateway Collegiate Athletic Conference football standings
	Conf.					Overall
Team	W		L		T	W		L		T
No. 9 Southwest Missouri State $^	5	–	1	–	0	10	–	3	–	0
No. 15 Eastern Illinois ^	4	–	2	–	0	9	–	4	–	0
No. 20 Northern Iowa	4	–	2	–	0	8	–	3	–	0
Illinois State	4	–	2	–	0	5	–	6	–	0
Indiana State	2	–	4	–	0	4	–	7	–	0
Western Illinois	1	–	5	–	0	4	–	7	–	0
Southern Illinois	1	–	5	–	0	2	–	9	–	0
$ – Conference champion; ^ – NCAA Division I-AA playoff participant; Rankings from NCAA Division I-AA Football Committee poll

The 1989 Southern Illinois Salukis football team was an American football team that represented Southern Illinois University (now known as Southern Illinois University Carbondale) in the Gateway Collegiate Athletic Conference (GCAC) during the 1989 NCAA Division I-AA football season. Under first-year head coach Bob Smith, the team compiled a 2–9 record (1–5 against conference opponents) and tied for sixth place in the conference. The team played its home games at McAndrew Stadium in Carbondale, Illinois.

The Salukis' game against Western Illinois began on September 9 but was suspended in the first quarter due to lightning. The game was completed the following day.

== Schedule ==
Date	Opponent	Site	Result	Attendance	Source
September 2	at Nevada*	Mackay Stadium; Reno, NV	L 3–41	15,280	
September 9–10	Western Illinois	McAndrew Stadium; Carbondale, IL	L 7–14	3,000	
September 16	Eastern Illinois	McAndrew Stadium; Carbondale, IL	W 20–17	10,000	
September 23	at No. 15 Murray State*	Roy Stewart Stadium; Murray, KY	L 11–24	6,850	
September 30	at No. 12 Arkansas State*	Indian Stadium; Jonesboro, AR	L 23–28	12,726	
October 7	at Northern Illinois*	Huskie Stadium; DeKalb, IL	L 24–29	23,933	
October 14	Illinois State	McAndrew Stadium; Carbondale, IL	L 17–21	12,000	
October 21	No. 8 Southwest Missouri State	McAndrew Stadium; Carbondale, IL	L 25–31	10,000	
October 28	Kentucky State*	McAndrew Stadium; Carbondale, IL	W 54–12	3,500	
November 4	at Indiana State	Memorial Stadium; Terre Haute, IN	L 24–35	2,346	
November 11	at Northern Iowa	UNI-Dome; Cedar Falls, IA	L 13–48	7,827	
*Non-conference game; Rankings from NCAA Division I-AA Football Committee Poll released prior to the game
