= 1982 Cal State Fullerton Titans football team =

American college football season

1982 Cal State Fullerton Titans football
- Conference: Pacific Coast Athletic Association
- Record: 3–9 (0–6 PCAA)
- Head coach: Gene Murphy (3rd season)
- Defensive coordinator: Bob Burt (3rd season)
- Home stadium: Titan Field

1982 Pacific Coast Athletic Association football standings
	Conf.					Overall
Team	W		L		T	W		L		T
Fresno State $	6	–	0	–	0	11	–	1	–	0
Long Beach State	5	–	1	–	0	6	–	5	–	0
San Jose State	4	–	2	–	0	8	–	3	–	0
Utah State	2	–	3	–	0	5	–	6	–	0
Pacific (CA)	2	–	4	–	0	2	–	9	–	0
UNLV	1	–	4	–	0	3	–	8	–	0
Cal State Fullerton	0	–	6	–	0	3	–	9	–	0
$ – Conference champion

The 1982 Cal State Fullerton Titans football team represented California State University, Fullerton as a member of the Pacific Coast Athletic Association (PCAA) during the 1982 NCAA Division I-A football season. Led by third-year head coach Gene Murphy, Cal State Fullerton compiled an overall record of 3–9 with a mark of 0–6 in conference play, placing last out of seven teams in the PCAA. The Titans played home games at Titan Field on the Cal State Fullerton campus. The football team shared the stadium with the Cal State Fullerton Titans baseball from 1980 to 1982.

== Schedule ==
Date	Time	Opponent	Site	Result	Attendance	Source
September 4		Northern Arizona*	Titan Field; Fullerton, CA	W 19–15	6,000	
September 11		at Boise State*	Bronco Stadium; Boise, ID	L 9–20	20,152	
September 18		at Cal Poly*	Mustang Stadium; San Luis Obispo, CA	W 14–10	5,542	
September 25		Utah State	Titan Field; Fullerton, CA	L 0–19	4,750	
October 1	7:30 p.m.	at Long Beach State	Veterans Stadium; Long Beach, CA	L 3–7	5,030	
October 9	1:00 p.m.	San Jose State	Titan Field; Fullerton, CA	L 15–38	6,000	
October 16		at Wyoming*	War Memorial Stadium; Laramie, WY	W 20–16	17,320	
October 23		Nevada*	Titan Field; Fullerton, CA	L 7–17	3,500	
October 30		at Hawaii*	Aloha Stadium; Halawa, HI	L 3–9	34,133	
November 6		at Fresno State	Bulldog Stadium; Fresno, CA	L 14–31	22,620	
November 20		at Pacific (CA)	Pacific Memorial Stadium; Stockton, CA	L 0–31	4,000	
November 27		at UNLV	Las Vegas Silver Bowl; Whitney, NV	L 23–42	12,923	
*Non-conference game; All times are in Pacific time

== Team players in the NFL ==
No Cal State Fullerton Titans were selected in the 1983 NFL draft.

The following finished their college career in 1982, were not drafted, but played in the NFL.

Player	Position	First NFL team
Alex Espinoza	Quarterback	1987 Kansas City Chiefs
Paul Moyer	Defensive back	1983 Seattle Seahawks
