= 1982 Long Beach State 49ers football team =

American college football season

1982 Long Beach State 49ers football
- Conference: Pacific Coast Athletic Association
- Record: 6–5 (5–1 PCAA)
- Head coach: Dave Currey (6th season)
- Defensive coordinator: Ken Visser (2nd season)
- Home stadium: Anaheim Stadium

1982 Pacific Coast Athletic Association football standings
	Conf.					Overall
Team	W		L		T	W		L		T
Fresno State $	6	–	0	–	0	11	–	1	–	0
Long Beach State	5	–	1	–	0	6	–	5	–	0
San Jose State	4	–	2	–	0	8	–	3	–	0
Utah State	2	–	3	–	0	5	–	6	–	0
Pacific (CA)	2	–	4	–	0	2	–	9	–	0
UNLV	1	–	4	–	0	3	–	8	–	0
Cal State Fullerton	0	–	6	–	0	3	–	9	–	0
$ – Conference champion

The 1982 Long Beach State 49ers football team represented California State University, Long Beach (Note: The official name of Long Beach State has been California State University, Long Beach since 1972. However, it is still commonly known as Long Beach State.) during the 1982 NCAA Division I-A football season.

Cal State Long Beach competed in the Pacific Coast Athletic Association. (Note: The Big West Conference was known as the Pacific Coast Athletic Association from its founding in 1969 through 1987.) The team was led by sixth-year head coach Dave Currey, and played the majority of their home games at Anaheim Stadium in Anaheim, California, with one game at Veterans Stadium adjacent to the campus of Long Beach City College in Long Beach, California. They finished the season with a record of six wins, five losses (6–5, 5–1 PCAA).

== Schedule ==
Date	Time	Opponent	Site	Result	Attendance	Source
September 11	1:30 p.m.	at No. 18 UCLA*	Rose Bowl; Pasadena, CA	L 10–41	45,396	
September 18	12:30 p.m.	at Wyoming*	War Memorial Stadium; Laramie, WY	L 27–36	16,844	
October 1	7:30 p.m.	Cal State Fullerton	Veterans Memorial Stadium; Long Beach, CA	W 7–3	5,030	
October 9	10:30 p.m.	at Cincinnati*	Riverfront Stadium; Cincinnati, OH	L 14–34	13,187	
October 16	7:01 p.m.	at San Jose State	Spartan Stadium; San Jose, CA	W 22–21	17,147	
October 23	7:30 p.m.	at San Diego State*	Jack Murphy Stadium; San Diego, CA	L 17–51	24,938	
October 30	1:33 p.m.	at Fresno State	Bulldog Stadium; Fresno, CA	L 22–40	24,333	
November 6	7:35 p.m.	Pacific (CA)	Anaheim Stadium; Anaheim, CA	W 32–31	4,658	
November 13	7:31 p.m.	UNLV	Anaheim Stadium; Anaheim, CA	W 24–13	4,660	
November 20	7:32 p.m.	Bowling Green*	Anaheim Stadium; Anaheim, CA	W 24–7	4,415	
November 27	7:33 p.m.	Utah State	Anaheim Stadium; Anaheim, CA	W 44–17	8,871	
*Non-conference game; Rankings from Coaches' Poll released prior to the game; All times are in Pacific time

== Team players in the NFL ==
No Long Beach State 49ers were selected in the 1983 NFL draft.

The following finished their college career in 1982, were not drafted, but played in the NFL.

Player	Position	First NFL team
Darrell Pattillo	Defensive back	1983 San Diego Chargers
Darren Long	Tight end	1986 Los Angeles Rams
