= 1982 Idaho Vandals football team =

American college football season

1982 Idaho Vandals football

NCAA Division I-AA Quarterfinal, L 30–38 at Eastern Kentucky
- Conference: Big Sky Conference
- Record: 9–4 (5–2 Big Sky)
- Head coach: Dennis Erickson (1st season)
- Offensive coordinator: Keith Gilbertson (1st season)
- Defensive coordinator: John L. Smith (1st season)
- Captains: Ken Hobart; Sam Merriman; Steve Seman
- Home stadium: Kibbie Dome

1982 Big Sky Conference football standings
	Conf.					Overall
Team	W		L		T	W		L		T
No. 19 Montana $^	5	–	2	–	0	6	–	6	–	0
No. 11 Idaho ^	5	–	2	–	0	9	–	4	–	0
Montana State	5	–	2	–	0	6	–	5	–	0
No. 15 Boise State	4	–	3	–	0	8	–	3	–	0
Nevada	3	–	4	–	0	6	–	5	–	0
Northern Arizona	3	–	4	–	0	4	–	7	–	0
Weber State	2	–	5	–	0	4	–	7	–	0
Idaho State	1	–	6	–	0	3	–	8	–	0
$ – Conference champion; ^ – NCAA Division I-AA playoff participant; Rankings from NCAA Division I-AA Poll

The 1982 Idaho Vandals football team represented the University of Idaho in the 1982 NCAA Division I-AA football season. The Vandals, led by first-year head coach Dennis Erickson, were members of the Big Sky Conference and played their home games at the Kibbie Dome, an indoor facility on campus in Moscow, Idaho.

Led by junior quarterback Ken Hobart, the Vandals finished 8–3 in the regular season and 5–2 in the Big Sky in a three-way tie for first, and qualified for the post-season for the first time in school history. Idaho defeated rival Boise State for the first time in six years, the first of twelve straight over the Broncos. The Vandals also defeated Idaho State, the defending conference and national champions; the consecutive intrastate games were both on the road.

Idaho rebounded from the previous season, in which they were preseason favorites, but finished 3–8 overall and winless in conference play under fourth-year head coach Jerry Davitch. The 1981 team lost their final six games, finishing with a fifth consecutive loss to Boise State.

The Vandals won all six home games in 1982 and finished at 9–4 overall. The nine victories were the most in school history, later surpassed only by the 1988 and 1993 teams, both of which won eleven games and reached the I-AA semifinals.

== Division I-AA playoffs ==
After recent Big Sky domination by Boise State, Idaho State, and Nevada, the 1982 season finished with three other teams at the top at 5–2; Idaho, Montana, and Montana State. After Idaho finished the regular season with a conference loss at Reno, Montana was declared the conference champion as it defeated the other two. (Montana State was the odd team out, as the Bobcats lost to both Montana and Idaho.) Montana and Idaho were both selected for the first time to participate in the Division I-AA playoffs, newly expanded to twelve teams for the fifth season of I-AA.

Although the Grizzlies (6–5, 5–2) were the conference champions due to their 40–16 win over Idaho in Missoula in mid-October, the Vandals were chosen by the NCAA to host the late November game, primarily due to their indoor stadium. Idaho won the rematch 21–7, played before a sparse afternoon crowd in Moscow two days after Thanksgiving, and advanced to the quarterfinals on the road against eventual champion Eastern Kentucky.

EKU was a I-AA finalist the previous three seasons; they won the title in 1979, but lost to Big Sky champions Boise State in 1980 and Idaho State in 1981. Down by a large margin early, Idaho mounted a comeback and nearly became the third team from the state to defeat EKU in the playoffs in as many years. The Vandals were well into EKU territory with 31 seconds remaining, but came up 8 points short after a controversial interception.

== Notable players ==
Linebacker Sam Merriman from Tucson was selected in the seventh round (177th overall) of the 1983 NFL draft by the Seattle Seahawks. A four-year starter for the Vandals, he played five seasons with Seattle, primarily on special teams. A serious knee injury in a 1988 preseason game ended his playing career. Junior quarterback Ken Hobart led the Vandals to an 8–3 record as a senior in 1983, then played a season in the USFL with Jacksonville in 1984 and several in the CFL.

== Coaches ==
The 1982 season was the first as a collegiate head coach for Dennis Erickson, age 35, who was previously the offensive coordinator at San Jose State under Jack Elway. He had coached in Moscow in 1974 and 1975, as offensive coordinator under Ed Troxel. Both of Erickson's coordinators for the 1982 Vandals were future head coaches at Idaho and other programs. Keith Gilbertson left after the 1982 season for Los Angeles of the new USFL, returned to Idaho in 1985, and was promoted after the season when Erickson left for Wyoming.

Defensive coordinator John L. Smith followed Erickson to Wyoming in 1986 and Washington State in 1987. Smith returned to the Vandals in January 1989 to succeed Gilbertson, who had left a month before to coach the offensive line for the Washington Huskies under Don James. Erickson left WSU for Miami in early March. Alumnus Chris Tormey was the Vandals' defensive line coach in 1982 and 1983; he left for Washington, then returned in 1995 as head coach for five seasons.

== Schedule ==
Date	Time	Opponent	Rank	Site	TV	Result	Attendance	Source
September 11	6:30 pm	at Washington State*		Joe Albi Stadium; Spokane, WA (Battle of the Palouse)		L 14–34	25,321	
September 18	7:30 pm	Pacific (CA)*		Kibbie Dome; Moscow, ID		W 36–17	10,500	
September 25	7:30 pm	Portland State*		Kibbie Dome; Moscow, ID		W 56–0	11,000	
October 2	1:30 pm	Weber State^{†}		Kibbie Dome; Moscow, ID		W 35–34	15,000	
October 9	11:30 am	at Northern Iowa*	No. 15	UNI-Dome; Cedar Falls, IA		W 38–13	11,438	
October 16	1:00 pm	at Montana	No. 14	Dornblaser Field; Missoula, MT (Little Brown Stein)		L 16–40	11,033	
October 23	7:30 pm	No. 13 Montana State		Kibbie Dome; Moscow, ID		W 36–20	13,000	
October 30	6:00 pm	at Boise State	No. 17	Bronco Stadium; Boise, ID (rivalry)		W 24–17	21,415	
November 6	6:30 pm	at Idaho State	No. 14	ASISU Minidome; Pocatello, ID (rivalry)		W 20–17	11,010	
November 13	7:30 pm	Northern Arizona	No. 10	Kibbie Dome; Moscow, ID		W 55–37	13,000	
November 20	1:00 pm	at Nevada	No. 9	Mackay Stadium; Reno, NV		L 16–25	7,333	
November 27	1:30 pm	No. 19 Montana	No. 11	Kibbie Dome; Moscow, ID (NCAA Division I-AA First Round)		W 21–7	8,000	
December 4	5:12 pm	at No. 1 Eastern Kentucky*	No. 11	Hanger Field; Richmond, KY (NCAA Division I-AA Quarterfinal)	WTBS	L 30–38	10,893	
*Non-conference game; ^{†}Homecoming; Rankings from NCAA Division I-AA Football Committee Poll released prior to the game; All times are in Pacific time

== Roster ==
1982 Idaho Vandals football team roster
Players
Coaches
Offense

Pos.	#	Name	Class
QB	9	Ken Hobart (C)	Jr
QB	10	Scott Linehan	Fr
QB	11	Sean Knudsen	Jr
TE	12	Scott Auker	Fr
RB	34	Kerry Hickey	Jr
RB	35	Wally Jones	Sr
RB	45	Tim Payne	Sr
G	55	Lance West	So
C	60	Shawn Jackson	Jr
G	62	Steve Seman (injured) (C)	Sr
OT	63	Dave Frohnen	Sr
OT	76	Greg Diehl	Jr
G	77	Dave Thorsen	Sr
TE	87	Kurt Vestman	Jr
WR	88	Vic Wallace	Sr
WR	89	Ron Whittenburg	Jr

Defense

Pos.	#	Name	Class
FS	1	Paul Pitre	So
FS, CB	2	Calvin Loveall	So
CB		Myron Bishop	Jr
OLB	33	John Crout	Jr
CB	36	Dean Davis	Sr
SS	42	Boyce Bailey	Jr
RDT	44	Frank Moreno	Jr
ILB	47	Darby Lewis	Jr
ILB	52	Sam Merriman (C)	Sr
RDT	53	Jay Wolf (injured)	Jr
NG	69	Charlie Coffin (injured)	Jr
DT		Jerry Nelson (injured)
LDT	78	Kevin Auxier	Sr
NG	79	Paul Griffin	Sr
OLB	85	John Fortner	Sr
OLB	90	Lloyd Williamson	Sr

Special teams

Pos.	#	Name	Class
K	3	Tim McMonigle	So
P		Pat Ball	Fr
KR,PR	88	Vic Wallace	Sr
KR,PR	2	Calvin Loveall	So

Head coach

- Dennis Erickson (1st year)

Coordinators/assistant coaches

- Keith Gilbertson (OC)
- John L. Smith (DC)
- Chris Tormey (DL)

Legend

- (C) Team captain
- (S) Suspended
- (I) Ineligible
- Injured
- Redshirt

== All-conference ==
Quarterback Ken Hobart, tight end Kurt Vestman, wide receiver Vic Wallace, and linebacker Sam Merriman were named to the Big Sky all-conference team; Hobart was the league's outstanding offensive player (and repeated in 1983). Vandals named to the second team were wide receiver Ron Whittenburg, nose guard Paul Griffin, linebacker John Fortner, and safety Boyce Bailey.

== NFL draft ==
One Vandal senior was selected in the 1983 NFL draft, which lasted 12 rounds (335 selections).

Player	Position	Round	Overall	Franchise
Sam Merriman	LB	7th	177	Seattle Seahawks
