= 1982 Nevada Wolf Pack football team =

American college football season

1982 Nevada Wolf Pack football
- Conference: Big Sky Conference
- Record: 6–5 (3–4 Big Sky)
- Head coach: Chris Ault (7th season)
- Home stadium: Mackay Stadium

1982 Big Sky Conference football standings
	Conf.					Overall
Team	W		L		T	W		L		T
No. 19 Montana $^	5	–	2	–	0	6	–	6	–	0
No. 11 Idaho ^	5	–	2	–	0	9	–	4	–	0
Montana State	5	–	2	–	0	6	–	5	–	0
No. 15 Boise State	4	–	3	–	0	8	–	3	–	0
Nevada	3	–	4	–	0	6	–	5	–	0
Northern Arizona	3	–	4	–	0	4	–	7	–	0
Weber State	2	–	5	–	0	4	–	7	–	0
Idaho State	1	–	6	–	0	3	–	8	–	0
$ – Conference champion; ^ – NCAA Division I-AA playoff participant; Rankings from NCAA Division I-AA Poll

The 1982 Nevada Wolf Pack football team represented the University of Nevada, Reno during the 1982 NCAA Division I-AA football season. Nevada competed as a member of the Big Sky Conference (BSC). The Wolf Pack were led by seventh-year head coach Chris Ault and played their home games at Mackay Stadium.

== Schedule ==
Date	Opponent	Site	Result	Attendance	Source
September 11	Texas A&I*	Mackay Stadium; Reno, NV	L 34–42	9,646	
September 18	at Boise State	Bronco Stadium; Boise, ID (rivalry)	L 13–20	21,038	
September 25	at Montana State	Reno H. Sales Stadium; Bozeman, MT	L 10–17	8,117	
October 2	Montana	Mackay Stadium; Reno, NV	L 27–28	8,112	
October 9	Northern Arizona^{†}	Mackay Stadium; Reno, NV	W 24–12	9,352	
October 16	Fresno State*	Mackay Stadium; Reno, NV	W 40–26	9,077	
October 23	at Cal State Fullerton*	Titan Field; Fullerton, CA	W 17–7	3,500	
October 30	Northern Iowa*	Mackay Stadium; Reno, NV	W 37–0	2,600	
November 6	at Weber State	Wildcat Stadium; Ogden, UT	L 43–46 ^{3OT}	5,248	
November 13	at Idaho State	ASISU Minidome; Pocatello, ID	W 24–14	8,099	
November 20	No. 9 Idaho	Mackay Stadium; Reno, NV	W 25–16	7,333	
*Non-conference game; ^{†}Homecoming; Rankings from NCAA Division I-AA Football Committee Poll released prior to the game
