= 1982 Idaho State Bengals football team =

American college football season

1982 Idaho State Bengals football
- Conference: Big Sky Conference
- Record: 3–8 (1–6 Big Sky)
- Head coach: Dave Kragthorpe (3rd season)
- Offensive coordinator: Jim Koetter (3rd season)
- Offensive scheme: West Coast
- Home stadium: ASISU Minidome

1982 Big Sky Conference football standings
	Conf.					Overall
Team	W		L		T	W		L		T
No. 19 Montana $^	5	–	2	–	0	6	–	6	–	0
No. 11 Idaho ^	5	–	2	–	0	9	–	4	–	0
Montana State	5	–	2	–	0	6	–	5	–	0
No. 15 Boise State	4	–	3	–	0	8	–	3	–	0
Nevada	3	–	4	–	0	6	–	5	–	0
Northern Arizona	3	–	4	–	0	4	–	7	–	0
Weber State	2	–	5	–	0	4	–	7	–	0
Idaho State	1	–	6	–	0	3	–	8	–	0
$ – Conference champion; ^ – NCAA Division I-AA playoff participant; Rankings from NCAA Division I-AA Poll

The 1982 Idaho State Bengals football team represented Idaho State University as member of the Big Sky Conference during the 1982 NCAA Division I-AA football season. The Bengals were led by third-year head coach Dave Kragthorpe and played their home games at the ASISU Minidome (now Holt Arena), an indoor venue on campus in Pocatello, Idaho. After winning the national title in 1981, the Bengals finished last in the Big Sky with a 1–6 record, and were 3–8 overall.

In early June 1983, assistant coach Jim Koetter was promoted to head coach after Kragthorpe left to become athletic director at his alma mater, Utah State University in Logan.

== Schedule ==
Date	Opponent	Site	Result	Attendance	Source
September 11	at Drake*	Drake Stadium; Des Moines, IA	W 41–21	13,147	
September 18	Portland State*	ASISU Minidome; Pocatello, ID	W 38–14	10,831	
September 25	Cal Poly*	ASISU Minidome; Pocatello, ID	L 13–15	10,247	
October 2	at Montana State	Sales Stadium; Bozeman, MT	L 27–30	8,197	
October 9	at Utah State*	Romney Stadium; Logan, UT	L 3–30	12,174	
October 16	at Northern Arizona	Walkup Skydome; Flagstaff, AZ	L 16–18	7,586	
October 23	No. 18 Montana	ASISU Minidome; Pocatello, ID	W 28–14	10,091	
October 30	at Weber State	Wildcat Stadium; Ogden, UT	L 7–27	4,220	
November 6	No. 14 Idaho	ASISU Minidome; Pocatello, ID (rivalry)	L 17–20	11,010	
November 13	Nevada	ASISU Minidome; Pocatello, ID	L 14–24	8,099	
November 20	No. 19 Boise State	ASISU Minidome; Pocatello, ID	L 24–27	12,101	
*Non-conference game; Rankings from NCAA Division I-AA Football Committee Poll released prior to the game

== After the season ==
The following Bengals were selected in the 1983 NFL draft after the season.

Round	Pick	Player	Position	NFL club
11	300	Dan Taylor	Tackle	Dallas Cowboys
12	321	Jim Lane	Center	Detroit Lions
