= 1982 California Bowl =

Bowling Green Falcons	Fresno State Bulldogs
(7–4)	(10–1)
28	29
Head coach: Denny Stolz	Head coach: Jim Sweeney
	1	2	3	4	Total
Bowling Green	0	14	14	0	28
Fresno State	0	0	7	22	29
- Date: December 18, 1982
- Season: 1982
- Stadium: Bulldog Stadium
- Location: Fresno, California
- Attendance: 30,000

United States TV coverage
- Network: Mizlou

The 1982 California Bowl was an American college football bowl game played on December 18, 1982 at Bulldog Stadium in Fresno, California. The game pitted the Bowling Green Falcons and the Fresno State Bulldogs. This may be the only documented time an NCAA Division I-AA and NCAA Division I-A faced off in a bowl game.

== Background ==
The Falcons opened their season with three straight conference wins (over Ohio, Central Michigan and Western Michigan). A loss to Miami (OH) stopped the streak, though they did beat Northern Illinois the week after. A loss to Toledo was their last conference loss as Bowling Green won the next three games over Kent State, Ball State, and Eastern Michigan. They closed their season out with losses to Long Beach State and North Carolina. Due to reclassification disagreements Bowling Green spent just this season in the NCAA Division I-AA. This was Bowling Green's first Mid-American Conference title since 1965 and was Bowling Green's second ever bowl game. Fresno State started the season with five straight wins (two of them being PCAA opponents), before a loss to Nevada. After that loss, the Bulldogs closed the season out with five straight wins to close out the season with 10 victories and 6 conference wins. This was their first Pacific Coast Athletic Association title since 1977. This was their first bowl appearance since the charity Mercy Bowl in 1971 along with their first true bowl appearance since 1946. The California Bowl was a bowl game played at Fresno State's at the time home stadium between the champion of the at the time known as PCAA and the champion of the MAC.

== Game summary ==
- Bowling Green - Chip Otten 4 yard touchdown run (Youssef kick), 11:17, 2nd qtr. 7-0 BGSU
- Bowling Green - John Meek 1 yard touchdown pass from Brian McClure (Youssef kick), 2:47, 2nd qtr. 14-0. BGSU
- Bowling Green - Shawn Potts 5 yard touchdown pass from Brian McClure (Youssef kick), 8:47, 3rd qtr. 21-0 BGSU
- Fresno State - Stephone Paige 11 yard touchdown pass from Jeff Tedford (Darrow kick), 7:25, 3rd qtr. 21-7 BGSU
- Bowling Green - Shawn Potts 6 yard fumble recovery (Youssef kick), :42, 3rd qtr. 28-7 BGSU
- Fresno State - Stephone Paige 4 yard touchdown run (Darrow kick), 12:11, 4th qtr. 28-14 BGSU
- Fresno State - Stephone Paige 27 yard touchdown pass from Jeff Tedford (Tedford-Carter pass), 3:16, 4th qtr. 28-22 BGSU
- Fresno State - Vince Wesson 2 yard touchdown pass from Jeff Tedford (Darrow kick), :11, 4th qtr. 29-28 FSU

The Bulldogs, playing in their home stadium, scored 22 points in the fourth quarter to complete the comeback. Fresno State gained 220 yards in the fourth quarter while Bowling Green had just 26. They had trailed by 21 points on two occasions, coming back both times. They had 27 first downs to Bowling Green's 17. The Falcons had 126 rushing yards while the Bulldogs had 80. Fresno State had 373 passing yard while Bowling Green had 246. The Bulldogs turned the ball over seven times while the Falcons turned it over once, along with being outpossessed 35:40 to 24:20. For Fresno State, Jeff Tedford threw 31-of-50 for 373 yards for three touchdowns and four interceptions. Stephone Paige caught 15 passes for 246 yards. For Bowling Green, Brian McClure threw 22-of-32 for 246 yards along with two touchdowns and one interception. Chip Otten rushed for 136 yards on 31 carries.

== Aftermath ==
The two teams met up twice more in the California Bowl, in 1985 and 1991, with the Bulldogs winning the first game and the Falcons winning the second. Fresno State made one other California Bowl appearance, in 1988, which the Bulldogs won. Bowling Green and Fresno State met again at the start of the 1983 season.
