= 1989 Boise State Broncos football team =

American college football season

1989 Boise State Broncos football
- Conference: Big Sky Conference
- Record: 6–5 (5–3 Big Sky)
- Head coach: Skip Hall (3rd season)
- Home stadium: Bronco Stadium

1989 Big Sky Conference football standings
	Conf.					Overall
Team	W		L		T	W		L		T
No. T–4 Idaho $^	8	–	0	–	0	9	–	3	–	0
No. 6 Montana ^	7	–	1	–	0	11	–	3	–	0
No. 19 Nevada	5	–	3	–	0	7	–	4	–	0
Boise State	5	–	3	–	0	6	–	5	–	0
Eastern Washington	4	–	4	–	0	4	–	6	–	0
Northern Arizona	2	–	6	–	0	3	–	8	–	0
Montana State	2	–	6	–	0	4	–	7	–	0
Idaho State	2	–	6	–	0	3	–	7	–	0
Weber State	1	–	7	–	0	3	–	8	–	0
$ – Conference champion; ^ – NCAA Division I-AA playoff participant; Rankings from NCAA Division I-AA Poll

The 1989 Boise State Broncos football team represented Boise State University in the 1989 NCAA Division I-AA football season. The Broncos competed in the Big Sky Conference and played their home games on campus at Bronco Stadium in Boise, Idaho. The Broncos were led by third–year head coach Skip Hall, Boise State finished the season 6–5 overall and 5–3 in conference.

== Schedule ==
Date	Opponent	Rank	Site	Result	Attendance	Source
September 9	Stephen F. Austin*	No. 12	Bronco Stadium; Boise, ID	W 23–12	19,918	
September 16	Long Beach State*	No. 12	Bronco Stadium; Boise, ID	L 14–17	20,307	
September 23	Oregon State*	No. 14	Bronco Stadium; Boise, ID	L 30–37	22,315	
September 30	at Weber State	No. 13	Wildcat Stadium; Ogden, UT	W 41–24	4,609	
October 7	Idaho State	No. 11	Bronco Stadium; Boise, ID	W 20–7	20,834	
October 14	Northern Arizona	No. 11	Bronco Stadium; Boise, ID	W 21–14	18,255	
October 21	Montana State	No. 7	Bronco Stadium; Boise, ID	W 37–10	19,241	
October 28	at No. 14 Montana	No. 6	Washington–Grizzly Stadium; Missoula, MT	L 13–48	10,388	
November 4	at Nevada	No. 13	Mackay Stadium; Reno, NV (rivalry)	L 14–30	18,275	
November 11	Eastern Washington		Bronco Stadium; Boise, ID	W 27–20	19,451	
November 18	at No. 5 Idaho	No. 20	Kibbie Dome; Moscow, ID (rivalry)	L 21–26	17,600	
*Non-conference game; Rankings from NCAA Division I-AA Football Committee Poll released prior to the game
