= 1982 San Jose State Spartans football team =

American college football season

1982 San Jose State Spartans football
- Conference: Pacific Coast Athletic Association
- Record: 8–3 (4–2 PCAA)
- Head coach: Jack Elway (4th season)
- Home stadium: Spartan Stadium

1982 Pacific Coast Athletic Association football standings
	Conf.					Overall
Team	W		L		T	W		L		T
Fresno State $	6	–	0	–	0	11	–	1	–	0
Long Beach State	5	–	1	–	0	6	–	5	–	0
San Jose State	4	–	2	–	0	8	–	3	–	0
Utah State	2	–	3	–	0	5	–	6	–	0
Pacific (CA)	2	–	4	–	0	2	–	9	–	0
UNLV	1	–	4	–	0	3	–	8	–	0
Cal State Fullerton	0	–	6	–	0	3	–	9	–	0
$ – Conference champion

The 1982 San Jose State Spartans football team represented San Jose State University during the 1982 NCAA Division I-A football season as a member of the Pacific Coast Athletic Association. (Note: The Big West Conference was known as the Pacific Coast Athletic Association from its founding in 1969 through 1987.) The team was led by head coach Jack Elway, in his fourth year at San Jose State. They played home games at Spartan Stadium in San Jose, California. The Spartans finished the 1982 season with a record of eight wins and three losses (8–3, 4–2 PCAA).

== Schedule ==
Date	Time	Opponent	Site	TV	Result	Attendance	Source
September 11	1:00 p.m.	at Oregon*	Autzen Stadium; Eugene, OR		W 18–13	17,629	
September 18	1:35 p.m.	at Stanford*	Stanford Stadium; Stanford, CA (rivalry)	CBS	W 35–31	60,789	
September 25	1:00 p.m.	at Oregon State*	Parker Stadium; Corvallis, OR		W 17–13	22,000	
October 2	12:36 p.m.	at California*	California Memorial Stadium; Berkeley, CA	ABC	L 7–26	37,000–37,137	
October 9	1:00 p.m.	at Cal State Fullerton	Titan Field; Fullerton, CA		W 38–15	6,000	
October 16	7:01 p.m.	Long Beach State	Spartan Stadium; San Jose, CA		L 21–22	17,147	
October 23	7:04 p.m.	Fresno State^{†}	Spartan Stadium; San Jose, CA (rivalry)		L 27–39	21,302	
October 30	7:31 p.m.	at UNLV	Las Vegas Silver Bowl; Whitney, NV		W 48–14	13,487	
November 6	7:01 p.m.	Santa Clara*	Spartan Stadium; San Jose, CA		W 40–0	17,793	
November 13	2:05 p.m.	at Pacific (CA)	Pacific Memorial Stadium; Stockton, CA (Victory Bell)		W 30–0	18,500	
November 20	7:01 p.m.	Utah State	Spartan Stadium; San Jose, CA		W 49–26	14,359	
*Non-conference game; ^{†}Homecoming; All times are in Pacific time

== Team Players in the NFL ==
The following were selected in the 1983 NFL draft.

Player	Position	Round	Overall	NFL team
Gill Byrd	Defensive back	1	22	San Diego Chargers
Ken Thomas	Running back	7	173	Kansas City Chiefs
Brian Hawkins	Defensive back	9	228	Denver Broncos
Mervyn Fernandez	Wide receiver	10	277	Los Angeles Raiders
Tim Kearse	Wide receiver	11	303	San Diego Chargers

The following finished their college career in 1982, were not drafted, but played in the NFL.

Player	Position	First NFL team
Gary Thompson	Defensive back	1983 Buffalo Bills
