= 1989 Northern Arizona Lumberjacks football team =

American college football season

1989 Northern Arizona Lumberjacks football
- Conference: Big Sky Conference
- Record: 3–8 (2–6 Big Sky)
- Head coach: Larry Kentera (5th season)
- Home stadium: Walkup Skydome

1989 Big Sky Conference football standings
| | Conf. | | | | | Overall |
| Team | W | | L | | T | W | | L | | T |
|---|---|---|---|---|---|---|---|---|---|---|
| No. T–4 Idaho $^ | 8 | – | 0 | – | 0 | 9 | – | 3 | – | 0 |
| No. 6 Montana ^ | 7 | – | 1 | – | 0 | 11 | – | 3 | – | 0 |
| No. 19 Nevada | 5 | – | 3 | – | 0 | 7 | – | 4 | – | 0 |
| Boise State | 5 | – | 3 | – | 0 | 6 | – | 5 | – | 0 |
| Eastern Washington | 4 | – | 4 | – | 0 | 4 | – | 6 | – | 0 |
| Northern Arizona | 2 | – | 6 | – | 0 | 3 | – | 8 | – | 0 |
| Montana State | 2 | – | 6 | – | 0 | 4 | – | 7 | – | 0 |
| Idaho State | 2 | – | 6 | – | 0 | 3 | – | 7 | – | 0 |
| Weber State | 1 | – | 7 | – | 0 | 3 | – | 8 | – | 0 |
$ – Conference champion; ^ – NCAA Division I-AA playoff participant; Rankings from NCAA Division I-AA Poll

The 1989 Northern Arizona Lumberjacks football team represented Northern Arizona University as a member of the Big Sky Conference during the 1989 NCAA Division I-AA football season. Led by fifth-year head coach Larry Kentera, the Lumberjacks compiled an overall record of 3–8, with a mark of 2–6 in conference play, and finished tied for sixth in the Big Sky.

== Schedule ==
| Date | Opponent | Site | Result | Attendance | Source |
|---|---|---|---|---|---|
| September 2 | Abilene Christian* | Walkup Skydome; Flagstaff, AZ | W 42–13 | | |
| September 9 | Western New Mexico* | Walkup Skydome; Flagstaff, AZ | L 17–21 | | |
| September 16 | at Weber State | Wildcat Stadium; Ogden, UT | W 20–17 | 8,645 | |
| September 30 | at Eastern Washington | Joe Albi Stadium; Spokane, WA | L 14–20 | | |
| October 7 | No. 20 Idaho | Walkup Skydome; Flagstaff, AZ | L 31–41 | 10,842 | |
| October 14 | at No. 11 Boise State | Bronco Stadium; Boise, ID | L 14–21 | 18,255 | |
| October 21 | No. 20 Montana | Walkup Skydome; Flagstaff, AZ | L 14–38 | 8,520 | |
| October 28 | at Idaho State | Holt Arena; Pocatello, ID | L 20–24 | | |
| November 4 | at Akron* | Rubber Bowl; Akron, OH | L 7–52 | 23,419 | |
| November 11 | Montana State | Walkup Skydome; Flagstaff, AZ | W 35–31 | | |
| November 18 | Nevada | Walkup Skydome; Flagstaff, AZ | L 45–52 | | |
*Non-conference game; Rankings from NCAA Division I-AA Football Committee Poll released prior to the game
