= 1989 Weber State Wildcats football team =

American college football season

1989 Weber State Wildcats football
- Conference: Big Sky Conference
- Record: 3–8 (1–7 Big Sky)
- Head coach: Dave Arslanian (1st season)
- Home stadium: Wildcat Stadium

1989 Big Sky Conference football standings
| | Conf. | | | | | Overall |
| Team | W | | L | | T | W | | L | | T |
|---|---|---|---|---|---|---|---|---|---|---|
| No. T–4 Idaho $^ | 8 | – | 0 | – | 0 | 9 | – | 3 | – | 0 |
| No. 6 Montana ^ | 7 | – | 1 | – | 0 | 11 | – | 3 | – | 0 |
| No. 19 Nevada | 5 | – | 3 | – | 0 | 7 | – | 4 | – | 0 |
| Boise State | 5 | – | 3 | – | 0 | 6 | – | 5 | – | 0 |
| Eastern Washington | 4 | – | 4 | – | 0 | 4 | – | 6 | – | 0 |
| Northern Arizona | 2 | – | 6 | – | 0 | 3 | – | 8 | – | 0 |
| Montana State | 2 | – | 6 | – | 0 | 4 | – | 7 | – | 0 |
| Idaho State | 2 | – | 6 | – | 0 | 3 | – | 7 | – | 0 |
| Weber State | 1 | – | 7 | – | 0 | 3 | – | 8 | – | 0 |
$ – Conference champion; ^ – NCAA Division I-AA playoff participant; Rankings from NCAA Division I-AA Poll

The 1989 Weber State Wildcats football team represented Weber State University as a member of the Big Sky Conference during the 1989 NCAA Division I-AA football season. Led by first-year head coach Dave Arslanian, the Wildcats compiled an overall record of 3–8 with a mark of 1–7 in conference play, placing last out of nine team in the Big Sky. Weber State played home games at Wildcat Stadium in Ogden, Utah.

== Schedule ==
| Date | Opponent | Site | Result | Attendance | Source |
|---|---|---|---|---|---|
| September 9 | at UNLV* | Sam Boyd Silver Bowl; Whitney, NV | L 12–16 | 17,718 | |
| September 16 | Northern Arizona | Wildcat Stadium; Ogden, UT | L 17–20 | 8,645 | |
| September 23 | Idaho | Wildcat Stadium; Ogden, UT | L 33–46 | | |
| September 30 | No. 13 Boise State | Wildcat Stadium; Ogden, UT | L 24–41 | 4,609 | |
| October 7 | at Montana | Washington–Grizzly Stadium; Missoula, MT | L 6–31 | 13,589 | |
| October 14 | Southern Utah* | Wildcat Stadium; Ogden, UT | W 42–7 | 5,121 | |
| October 21 | at Nevada | Mackay Stadium; Reno, NV | L 15–47 | 13,470 | |
| October 28 | at Montana State | Sales Stadium; Bozeman, MT | L 27–31 | 3,107 | |
| November 4 | Eastern Washington^{†} | Wildcat Stadium; Ogden, UT | L 10–27 | 3,509 | |
| November 11 | Southwest State (MN)* | Wildcat Stadium; Ogden, UT | W 55–0 | 1,622 | |
| November 18 | at Idaho State | Holt Arena; Pocatello, ID | W 45–35 | 5,788 | |
*Non-conference game; ^{†}Homecoming; Rankings from NCAA Division I-AA Football Committee Poll released prior to the game
