= 1989 Indiana State Sycamores football team =

American college football season

1989 Indiana State Sycamores football
- Conference: Gateway Collegiate Athletic Conference
- Record: 4–7 (2–4 GCAC)
- Head coach: Dennis Raetz (10th season)
- Home stadium: Memorial Stadium

1989 Gateway Collegiate Athletic Conference football standings
	Conf.					Overall
Team	W		L		T	W		L		T
No. 9 Southwest Missouri State $^	5	–	1	–	0	10	–	3	–	0
No. 15 Eastern Illinois ^	4	–	2	–	0	9	–	4	–	0
No. 20 Northern Iowa	4	–	2	–	0	8	–	3	–	0
Illinois State	4	–	2	–	0	5	–	6	–	0
Indiana State	2	–	4	–	0	4	–	7	–	0
Western Illinois	1	–	5	–	0	4	–	7	–	0
Southern Illinois	1	–	5	–	0	2	–	9	–	0
$ – Conference champion; ^ – NCAA Division I-AA playoff participant; Rankings from NCAA Division I-AA Football Committee poll

The 1989 Indiana State Sycamores football team represented Indiana State University as a member of the Gateway Collegiate Athletic Conference (GCAC) during the 1989 NCAA Division I-AA football season. The team was led by tenth-year head coach Dennis Raetz and played their home games at Memorial Stadium in Terre Haute, Indiana. The Sycamores finished the season with a 4–7 record overall and a 2–4 record in conference play.

== Schedule ==
Date	Opponent	Site	Result	Attendance	Source
September 2	Central Missouri State*	Memorial Stadium; Terre Haute, IN	W 21–15	5,328	
September 9	at Southwest Missouri State	Briggs Stadium; Springfield, MO	L 10–31		
September 16	Austin Peay*	Memorial Stadium; Terre Haute, IN	W 42–15		
September 23	at Eastern Illinois	O'Brien Stadium; Charleston, IL	L 7–21		
September 30	at Minnesota*	Metrodome; Minneapolis, MN	L 14–34	34,280	
October 7	Youngstown State*	Memorial Stadium; Terre Haute, IN	L 19–20		
October 14	Northern Iowa^{†}	Memorial Stadium; Terre Haute, IN	L 21–24	8,129	
October 21	at Illinois State	Hancock Stadium; Normal, IL	L 13–15	9,275	
October 26	vs. Ball State*	Hoosier Dome; Indianapolis, IN (rivalry)	L 27–34	6,249	
November 4	Southern Illinois	Memorial Stadium; Terre Haute, IN	W 35–24	2,346	
November 11	at Western Illinois	Hanson Field; Macomb, IL	W 13–7	7,631	
*Non-conference game; ^{†}Homecoming
