= 1989 Idaho State Bengals football team =

American college football season

1989 Idaho State Bengals football
- Conference: Big Sky Conference
- Record: 3–7 (2–6 Big Sky)
- Head coach: Garth Hall (2nd season)
- Home stadium: Holt Arena

1989 Big Sky Conference football standings
	Conf.					Overall
Team	W		L		T	W		L		T
No. T–4 Idaho $^	8	–	0	–	0	9	–	3	–	0
No. 6 Montana ^	7	–	1	–	0	11	–	3	–	0
No. 19 Nevada	5	–	3	–	0	7	–	4	–	0
Boise State	5	–	3	–	0	6	–	5	–	0
Eastern Washington	4	–	4	–	0	4	–	6	–	0
Northern Arizona	2	–	6	–	0	3	–	8	–	0
Montana State	2	–	6	–	0	4	–	7	–	0
Idaho State	2	–	6	–	0	3	–	7	–	0
Weber State	1	–	7	–	0	3	–	8	–	0
$ – Conference champion; ^ – NCAA Division I-AA playoff participant; Rankings from NCAA Division I-AA Poll

The 1989 Idaho State Bengals football team represented Idaho State University as a member of the Big Sky Conference during the 1989 NCAA Division I-AA football season. Led by second-year head coach Garth Hall, the Bengals compiled an overall record of 3–7, with a mark of 2–6 in conference play, and finished tied for sixth in the Big Sky.

== Schedule ==
Date	Opponent	Site	Result	Attendance	Source
September 9	at Northern Colorado*	Jackson Field; Greeley, CO	L 17–19		
September 16	Southern Utah*	Holt Arena; Pocatello, ID	W 37–34		
September 23	at Nevada	Mackay Stadium; Reno, NV	L 10–39	11,330	
September 30	Montana State	Holt Arena; Pocatello, ID	W 23–21	8,250	
October 7	at No. 11 Boise State	Bronco Stadium; Boise, ID	L 7–20	20,834	
October 14	at Eastern Washington	Woodward Field; Cheney, WA	L 26–45	5,009	
October 28	Northern Arizona	Holt Arena; Pocatello, ID	W 24–20		
November 4	No. 7 Idaho	Holt Arena; Pocatello, ID (rivalry)	L 31–47	10,380	
November 11	at No. 8 Montana	Washington–Grizzly Stadium; Missoula, MT	L 21–35	9,021	
November 18	Weber State	Holt Arena; Pocatello, ID	L 35–45	5,788	
*Non-conference game; Rankings from NCAA Division I-AA Football Committee Poll released prior to the game
