= 1982 Boise State Broncos football team =

American college football season

1982 Boise State Broncos football
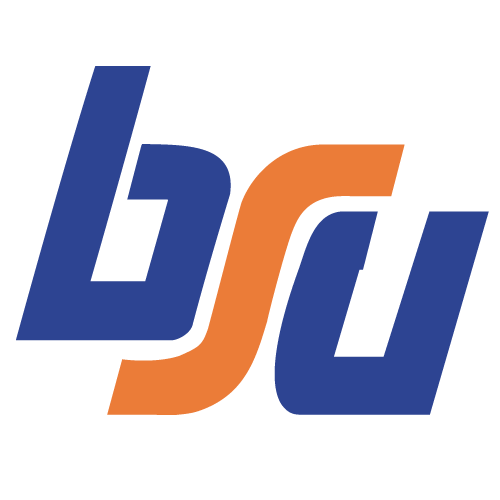
- Conference: Big Sky Conference
- Record: 8–3 (4–3 Big Sky)
- Head coach: Jim Criner (7th season)
- Offensive coordinator: Gene Dahlquist (6th season)
- Defensive coordinator: Lyle Setencich (3rd season)
- Base defense: 4–3
- Home stadium: Bronco Stadium

1982 Big Sky Conference football standings
	Conf.					Overall
Team	W		L		T	W		L		T
No. 19 Montana $^	5	–	2	–	0	6	–	6	–	0
No. 11 Idaho ^	5	–	2	–	0	9	–	4	–	0
Montana State	5	–	2	–	0	6	–	5	–	0
No. 15 Boise State	4	–	3	–	0	8	–	3	–	0
Nevada	3	–	4	–	0	6	–	5	–	0
Northern Arizona	3	–	4	–	0	4	–	7	–	0
Weber State	2	–	5	–	0	4	–	7	–	0
Idaho State	1	–	6	–	0	3	–	8	–	0
$ – Conference champion; ^ – NCAA Division I-AA playoff participant; Rankings from NCAA Division I-AA Poll

The 1982 Boise State Broncos football team represented Boise State University in the 1982 NCAA Division I-AA football season. The Broncos competed in the Big Sky Conference and played their home games on campus at Bronco Stadium in Boise, Idaho. The Broncos were led by seventh–year head coach Jim Criner, Boise State finished the season 8–3 overall and 4–3 in conference for fourth place.

Entering the rivalry game with Idaho at Bronco Stadium on October 30, Boise State had a five–game winning streak over the Vandals. Idaho won 24–17, and the Broncos did not defeat the Vandals for over a decade, until 1994.

Two months after the season ended, Criner left for Iowa State University of the Big Eight Conference for an annual base salary of $58,000 for five years, plus an estimated $92,000 per year of media and camp income. Defensive coordinator Lyle Setencich was soon promoted to head coach in January 1983.

== Schedule ==
Date	Time	Opponent	Rank	Site	Result	Attendance	Source
September 11		Cal State Fullerton*		Bronco Stadium; Boise, ID	W 20–9	20,152	
September 18		Nevada		Bronco Stadium; Boise, ID (rivalry)	W 20–13	21,038	
September 25		at Pacific (CA)*	No. 7	Pacific Memorial Stadium; Stockton, CA	W 22–15	10,500	
October 2		at Northern Arizona	No. 6	Walkup Skydome; Flagstaff, AZ	L 14–30	13,869	
October 9		Montana	No. 12	Bronco Stadium; Boise, ID	W 21–14	19,464	
October 16		at Montana State	No. 8	Reno H. Sales Stadium; Bozeman, MT	L 14–27	13,397	
October 23	7:00 pm	Weber State		Bronco Stadium; Boise, ID	W 41–21	17,750	
October 30	7:00 pm	No. 17 Idaho		Bronco Stadium; Boise, ID (rivalry)	L 17–24	21,415	
November 6		at Cal Poly*		Mustang Stadium; San Luis Obispo, CA	W 26–24	4,554	
November 13	1:30 pm	Utah State*		Bronco Stadium; Boise, ID	W 30–10	14,868	
November 20		at Idaho State	No. 19	ASISU Minidome; Pocatello, ID	W 27–24	12,101	
*Non-conference game; Rankings from NCAA Division I-AA Football Committee Poll released prior to the game; All times are in Mountain time

== Roster ==
1982 Boise State Broncos football team roster
Players
Coaches
Offense -->

Pos.	#	Name	Class
FL	1	Ron Harvey	Sr
QB	13	Gerald DesPres	So
QB	18	Tim Klena	Jr
WR	19	Randy Mayo	Sr
TB	34	Rodney Webster	Jr
FB	36	Robert Farmer	Sr
C	62	Steve Despot	So
G		Todd Biggs	Jr
G	71	Jon Zogg	Sr
OT	73	John Kilgo	Sr
OT	79	Greg Jones	Jr
WR	89	Kim Metcalf	Jr
TE	96	Mike Alexander	So

Defense

Pos.	#	Name	Class
LCB	4	Jeff Turk	Sr
SS	21	Butch Fisk	Jr
RCB	37	Bobby Fryer	Sr
FS	42	Larry Alder	Sr
LDT	43	Bob Skinner	Sr
LB	44	Curt Hecker	Sr
LB	48	Mark Wulff	So
LB		Chuck Butler	Jr
LB	55	Carl Keever	So
LDE	58	John Rade	Sr
RDT	75	Eric McCree	Sr
RDE	92	Mike Johnson	Fr

Special teams

Pos.	#	Name	Class
K		Mark Jensen	Fr
P	88	Ron Talbot	Fr

Head coach

- Jim Criner (7th year)

Coordinators/assistant coaches

- Gene Dahlquist (OC)
- Lyle Setencich (DC)
- Bill Dutton (DL)
- Phil Snow (DB)

Legend

- (C) Team captain
- (S) Suspended
- (I) Ineligible
- Injured
- Redshirt

== NFL draft ==
Two Bronco seniors were selected in the 1983 NFL draft, which lasted 12 rounds (335 selections).

Player	Position	Round	Overall	Franchise
Jeff Turk	DB	7th	183	Atlanta Falcons
John Rade	LB	8th	215	Atlanta Falcons
