= 1982 Utah State Aggies football team =

American college football season

1982 Utah State Aggies football
- Conference: Pacific Coast Athletic Association
- Record: 5–6 (2–4 PCAA)
- Head coach: Bruce Snyder (7th season)
- Home stadium: Romney Stadium

1982 Pacific Coast Athletic Association football standings
	Conf.					Overall
Team	W		L		T	W		L		T
Fresno State $	6	–	0	–	0	11	–	1	–	0
Long Beach State	5	–	1	–	0	6	–	5	–	0
San Jose State	4	–	2	–	0	8	–	3	–	0
Utah State	2	–	3	–	0	5	–	6	–	0
Pacific (CA)	2	–	4	–	0	2	–	9	–	0
UNLV	1	–	4	–	0	3	–	8	–	0
Cal State Fullerton	0	–	6	–	0	3	–	9	–	0
$ – Conference champion

The 1982 Utah State Aggies football team represented Utah State University during the 1982 NCAA Division I-A football season as a member of the Pacific Coast Athletic Association (PCAA). The Aggies were led by seventh-year head coach Bruce Snyder and played their home games at Romney Stadium in Logan, Utah. They finished the season with a record of five wins and six losses (5–6, 2–4 PCAA). This was the final season that Snyder served as head coach of the Aggies as he resigned his position on February 28, 1983, and became an assistant coach with the Los Angeles Rams.

== Schedule ==
Date	Time	Opponent	Site	Result	Attendance	Source
September 11		at TCU*	Amon G. Carter Stadium; Fort Worth, TX	L 9–24	17,423	
September 18		Weber State*	Romney Stadium; Logan, UT	W 31–10	15,054	
September 25		at Cal State Fullerton	Titan Stadium; Fullerton, CA	W 19–0	4,750	
October 2		at Fresno State	Bulldog Stadium; Fresno, CA	L 6–31	25,174	
October 9		Idaho State*	Romney Stadium; Logan, UT	W 30–3	12,174	
October 16	1:30 p.m.	Pacific (CA)	Romney Stadium; Logan, UT	W 14–12	10,026	
October 30		BYU*	Romney Stadium; Logan, UT (rivalry, Beehive Boot)	W 20–17	25,688	
November 6		at Utah*	Robert Rice Stadium; Salt Lake City, UT (Battle of the Brothers, Beehive Boot)	L 10–42	30,625	
November 13		at Boise State*	Bronco Stadium; Boise, ID	L 10–30	14,868	
November 20	8:01 p.m.	at San Jose State	Spartan Stadium; San Jose, CA	L 26–49	14,359	
November 27	8:33 p.m.	at Long Beach State	Anaheim Stadium; Anaheim, CA	L 17–44	8,871	
*Non-conference game; All times are in Mountain time
