= Ardell Wiegandt =

American gridiron football player and coach (born 1940)

Profile
- Position: Linebacker

Personal information
- Born: June 28, 1940 (age 86); Lakota, North Dakota, U.S.

Career information
- College: NDSU

Career history
- 1974-1975: Birmingham Americans —Linebackers Coach (1974) —Defensive Coordinator (1975)
- 1977-1981: Calgary Stampeders —Assistant Coach (1977-1979) —Head Coach (1980-1981)
- 1982: Montreal Concordes; Assistant coach
- 1985-1986: Buffalo Bills —Defensive Line Coach (1985) —Outside Linebackers Coach (1986)
- 1988: Ottawa Rough Riders; Defensive line/linebackers coach
- 1989–1997: Northern Iowa Panthers; Defensive coordinator
- 1997–2000: Kansas Jayhawks; Defensive coordinator

Ardell Leonard Wiegandt (born June 28, 1940) is an American former professional football coach. He was the coach of the Calgary Stampeders from 1980 to 1981. He was also inducted into the North Dakota State Athletic Hall of Fame in 1977.
