= Tim Washington =

American gridiron football player (1959–1992)

No. 46, 42
- Position: Defensive back

Personal information
- Born: November 7, 1959; Fresno, California, U.S.
- Died: January 4, 1992 (aged 32); Fremont, California, U.S.
- Listed height: 5 ft 9 in (1.75 m)
- Listed weight: 184 lb (83 kg)

Career information
- High school: Fresno
- College: California; Fresno State
- NFL draft: 1982: 12th round, 334th overall pick

Career history
- San Francisco 49ers (1982); Kansas City Chiefs (1982); Saskatchewan Roughriders (1984); Indianapolis Colts (1985)*
- * Offseason or practice squad member only

Awards and highlights
- Defensive MVP Blue-Gray game (1981)

Career NFL statistics
- Games played: 2
- Stats at Pro Football Reference

Timothy Bernard Washington (July 11, 1959 – January 4, 1992) was an American professional football player who was a defensive back in the National Football League (NFL). He played college football for the California Golden Bears and Fresno State Bulldogs. Washington was the final selection of the 1982 NFL draft, selected by the San Francisco 49ers. He would split that season between the 49ers and the Kansas City Chiefs.

Washington's brother Anthony Washington also played in the NFL.

== Professional career ==
=== San Francisco 49ers ===
The San Francisco 49ers waived him on September 6, 1982.

=== Kansas City Chiefs ===
Washington was waived by the Kansas City Chiefs on August 1, 1983.

=== Saskatchewan Roughriders ===
In May 1984, Washington signed a contract with the Saskatchewan Roughriders of the Canadian Football League.
