= Kibbie Dome =

Multi-purpose roofed stadium in Moscow, Idaho

P1FCU Kibbie Dome
- Kibbie Dome
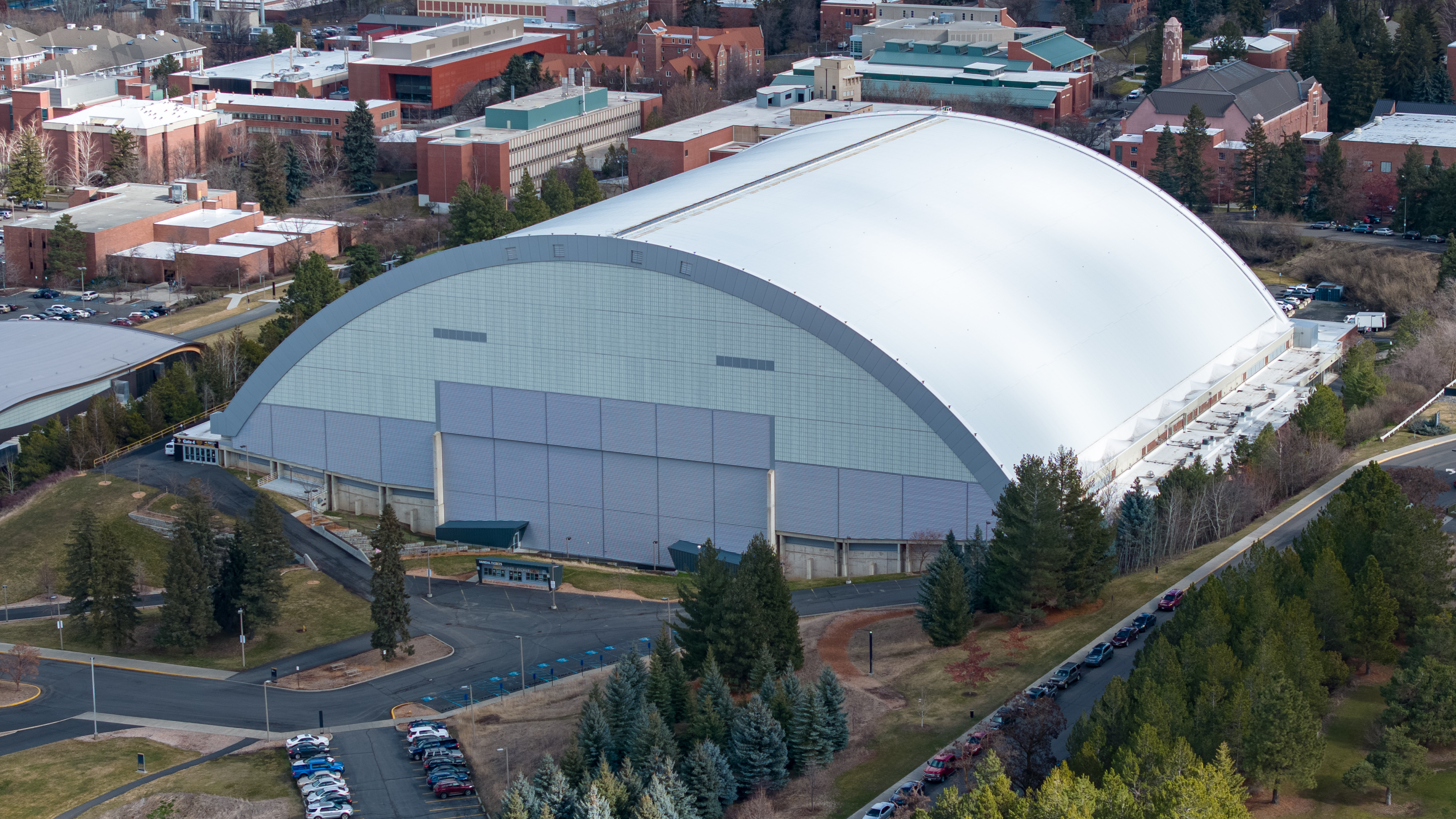
- Aerial view from southwest in 2024

- Location in the United States Location in Idaho
- Interactive map of P1FCU Kibbie Dome
- Former names: Kibbie-ASUI Activity Center (1974–2023); Idaho Stadium (1971–1974)
- Address: S. Rayburn Street
- Location: University of Idaho; Moscow, Idaho, U.S.
- Coordinates: 46.726°N 117.017°W
- Elevation: 2,610 ft (795 m) AMSL
- Owner: University of Idaho
- Operator: University of Idaho
- Capacity: Football: 15,250 (2011–present); 16,000 (1971–2010); Basketball: 7,000 (Cowan Spectrum)
- Surface: Matrix Turf (2017–present); RealGrass Pro (2007–2016); AstroTurf (1990–2006); Tartan Turf (1972–1989); Natural grass (1971)
- Record attendance: 19,878 vs. Boise State on November 18, 1989; 11,800 – (basketball) vs. Montana on February 12, 1983

Construction
- Groundbreaking: February 1971
- Opened: September 27, 1975; 51 years ago October 9, 1971 (outdoor); 55 years ago as new "Idaho Stadium"
- Cost: $7.84 million ($46.9 million in 2025)
- Architects: Gene E. Cline of CSHQA; Boise, Idaho
- Main contractors: Emerick Construction Co. Portland, Oregon

Tenant
- Idaho Vandals (NCAA) (1971–present)

The P1FCU Kibbie Dome, known simply as the Kibbie Dome and formerly named the Kibbie-ASUI Activity Center, is a multi-purpose indoor athletic stadium on the campus of the University of Idaho in Moscow, Idaho. Despite its name it is not a domed stadium but is covered with a barrel-arched roof.

The stadium is the home of the Idaho Vandals of the Big Sky Conference for four sports (football, tennis, indoor track and field, soccer). Basketball was played in the venue until the autumn 2021 opening of the adjacent Idaho Central Credit Union Arena (ICCU Arena).

The Kibbie Dome opened 55 years ago as an outdoor concrete football stadium in October 1971, built on the same site of the demolished wooden Neale Stadium. Following the 1974 season, a barrel-arched roof and vertical end walls were added and the stadium re-opened as an enclosed facility in September 1975.

With 16,000 permanent seats, the Kibbie Dome was the second smallest home stadium in Division I FBS (formerly Division I-A) from 1997 to 2017. In 2018, Idaho football rejoined the Big Sky in FCS.

From February 2001 until the opening of ICCU Arena in autumn 2021, the Kibbie Dome was reconfigured for basketball games and was referred to as the Cowan Spectrum, seating 7,000.

Potlatch First Financial Credit Union, a credit union based in Lewiston, acquired naming rights to the stadium in June 2023 in a ten-year deal for $5 million as part of a broader partnership with the university.

The elevation of the playing surface is 2,610 feet (795 m) above sea level.

== History ==
=== Construction ===
The stadium was built in stages and took several years to complete. Originally, the new football stadium was to be outdoors and seat over 23,000 spectators, with an adjacent 10,000-seat indoor arena for basketball. The Pacific Coast Athletic Association (PCAA), known since 1988 as the Big West Conference, had been launched in 1969 and Idaho was attempting to join, but political wrangling in the state legislature and subsequent budget cuts caused a change in the scope of the stadium project. This ensured that Idaho could not make the move to the PCAA; the Vandals remained in the Big Sky Conference with the other state schools, Idaho State and new member Boise State. Idaho eventually joined the Big West in 1996.

The revised plan was for a smaller capacity football stadium, to be enclosed to allow use as a basketball arena (and indoor track and tennis as well). This multi-purpose concept had been recently used at Idaho State in Pocatello, where ICCU Dome had opened as the Minidome in 1970.

Construction on the concrete grandstands started in February 1971, after a fire destroyed the previously condemned wooden Neale Stadium in November 1969. The stadium, which opened in 1937, had been condemned in August 1969 due to soil erosion beneath the grandstands. The Vandal football team played its limited home schedule for the next two seasons at WSU's Rogers Field in nearby Pullman.

After a fire significantly damaged Rogers Field's south grandstand in April 1970, WSU moved all of its 1970 and 1971 home games to Joe Albi Stadium in Spokane, but the Vandals remained at Rogers in Pullman for four "home" games in 1970. The Vandals' game with WSU on September 19 in Spokane was dubbed the "Displaced Bowl". A lopsided 44–16 win for the Cougars, it was WSU's only victory in a stretch of 22 games.

Back in Moscow, weather-related construction delays in the spring put the new "Idaho Stadium" a month behind schedule. The Vandals played their first two "home" games in 1971 well away from campus, in Boise for the opener and Spokane two weeks later. Uncompleted, the stadium debuted on October 9 with a 40–3 victory over Idaho State before 14,200; it was the first football game on campus in nearly three years. The Vandals went 8–3 in 1971, which included a school-record eight-game winning streak, and won the Big Sky title.

For its first four seasons (1971–74), the stadium was outdoors and without lights. In the summer of 1972, a Tartan Turf field was installed over a four-inch (10 cm) asphalt bed, with a roll-up mechanism behind the west end zone; the one-piece field was the first in the world. In November 1974, approval was finally granted by the board of regents to enclose the stadium. The arched roof and vertical end walls were completed in time for the 1975 season's home opener on September 27, a deflating 29–14 loss to Idaho State in front of 14,079.

The enclosed stadium was renamed that year for William H. Kibbie, a construction executive from Salt Lake City and a primary benefactor of the project; he contributed $300,000 in 1974 to initiate the funding drive. Bill Kibbie (1918–1988), originally of Bellevue in Blaine County, was a UI student for less than a month in 1936 when he withdrew due to his father's illness. He entered the construction business, then served as a B-24 pilot in World War II, and eventually founded JELCO in 1957, later EMKO, a major contracting company in Utah. The acronym "ASUI" is for the "Associated Students of the University of Idaho", which functions as the student government.

When the university announced it would enclose its football stadium, the fledgling Trus Joist Company of Boise bid on and won the project. While steel and aluminum were the products of the day for domes and large unsupported buildings, Trus Joist saw the UI stadium as a chance to demonstrate the strength, durability, and economy of their engineered wood products. From the final design to the end of construction, the enclosure project took just ten months and $1 million to complete. In 1976, the Kibbie Dome roof won the "Structural Engineering Achievement Award" from the American Society of Civil Engineers. TJ International, the successor to Trus Joist, was acquired by Weyerhaeuser in late 1999.

=== Renovations ===
Following the first indoor football season, the asphalt base underneath the field was covered with Tartan polyurethane in January 1976. The first basketball game was played on January 21, and the inaugural Vandal Invitational indoor track meet was held three days later.

The Kibbie Dome's roof spans 400 feet (120 m) from sideline-to-sideline, and its maximum height is 150 feet (45 m) above the hashmarks. (The ICCU Dome, completed in 1970 on the campus of Idaho State University in Pocatello, has an opposite geometry: its arched roof spans the length of the football field, rather than its width, resulting in a very low roof at the end lines and goal posts.)

Soon after completion in 1975, problems arose with the roof's exterior. The 4.5-acre (1.8 ha) outer surface of Hypalon and underlying polyurethane foam were improperly applied and a second attempt to seal the roof with Diathon in the late 1970s did not succeed. Leaks were occurring and wood rot was a potential problem by 1980. An infrared scan of the roof in the spring of 1981 showed that half of it was moist and the insulating foam was in poor condition. Various stopgap measures were taken to stop the leaks in 1981. After an extended period of finger-pointing and threatened legal action, an out-of-court settlement was reached; a new superstructure with a composite roof was built over the original. Completed in the fall of 1982, coinciding with the completion of the East End Addition, the second roof shielded the first and solved the problem. A by-product of the settlement was the exposure of many safety issues with the venue.

== Football ==
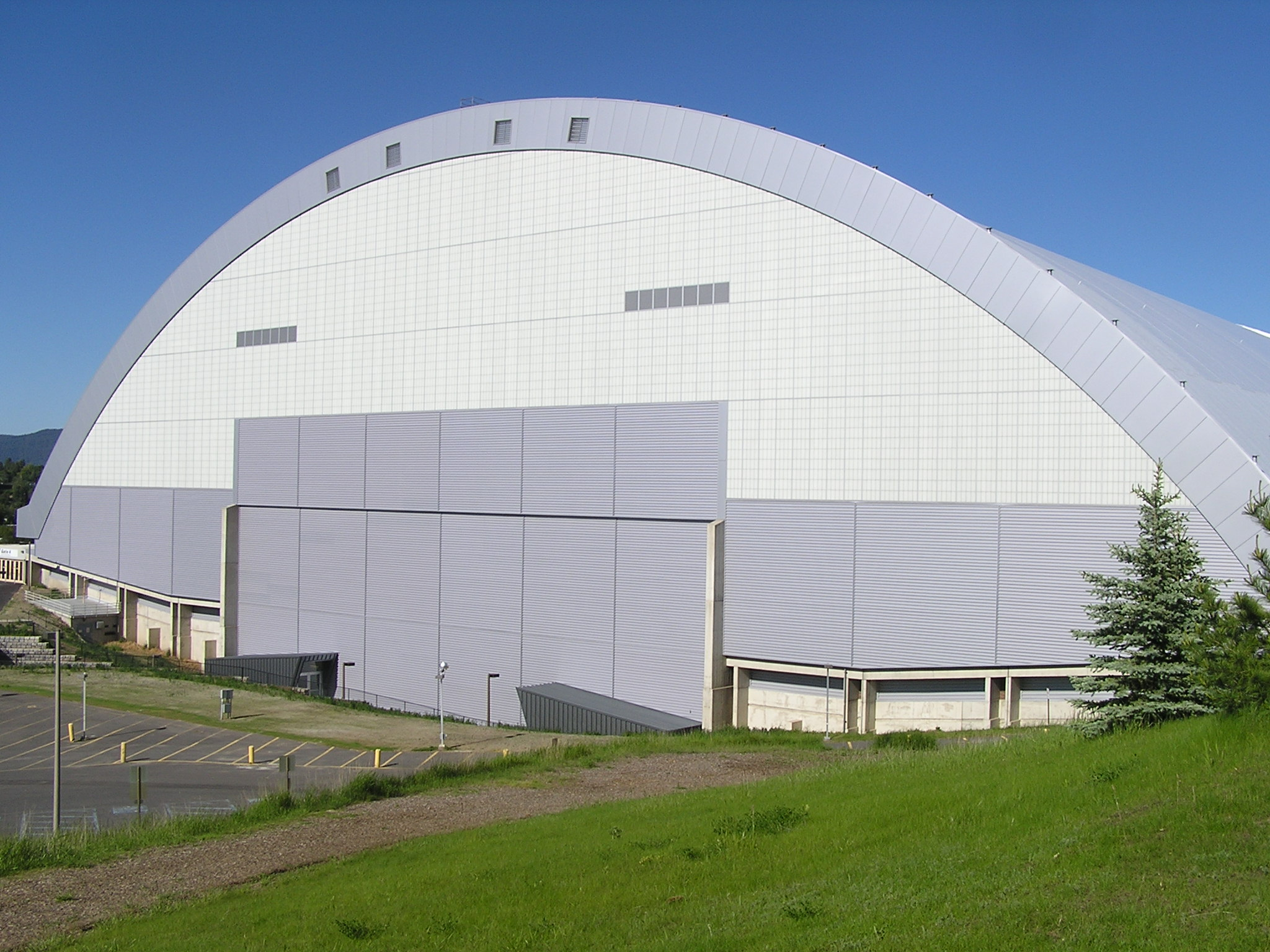
Kibbie Dome's west side in 2010

Up until 2011 the Kibbie Dome officially sat 16,000 spectators for football. By the end of Idaho's tenure in Division I FBS (formerly Division I-A) in the 2017 season, it was the second-smallest FBS venue. A record crowd of 19,878 was recorded for the eighth consecutive rivalry game victory over Boise State in November 1989, during the schools' I-AA Big Sky era. The football field runs an unorthodox east–west, but even with the new translucent upper end walls (2009 and 2011), sun location is not a major visibility issue.

For two and a half seasons, 1999 to 2001, the Vandals used WSU's Martin Stadium in nearby Pullman as its home field, as Idaho transitioned back to Division I-A from Division I-AA. When Dennis Erickson returned as head coach in 2006, there was talk of adding a second deck to the Kibbie Dome to increase the football seating to 25,000, and building a new basketball arena. In February 2007, the state board of education appropriated funds to study expansion possibilities. On December 6, the board approved funding to begin design work for $52 million in improvements, including an expansion to 20,000 seats, lowering the elevation of the playing field, and other various safety and spectator improvements. However, the capacity was ultimately never expanded beyond 16,000.

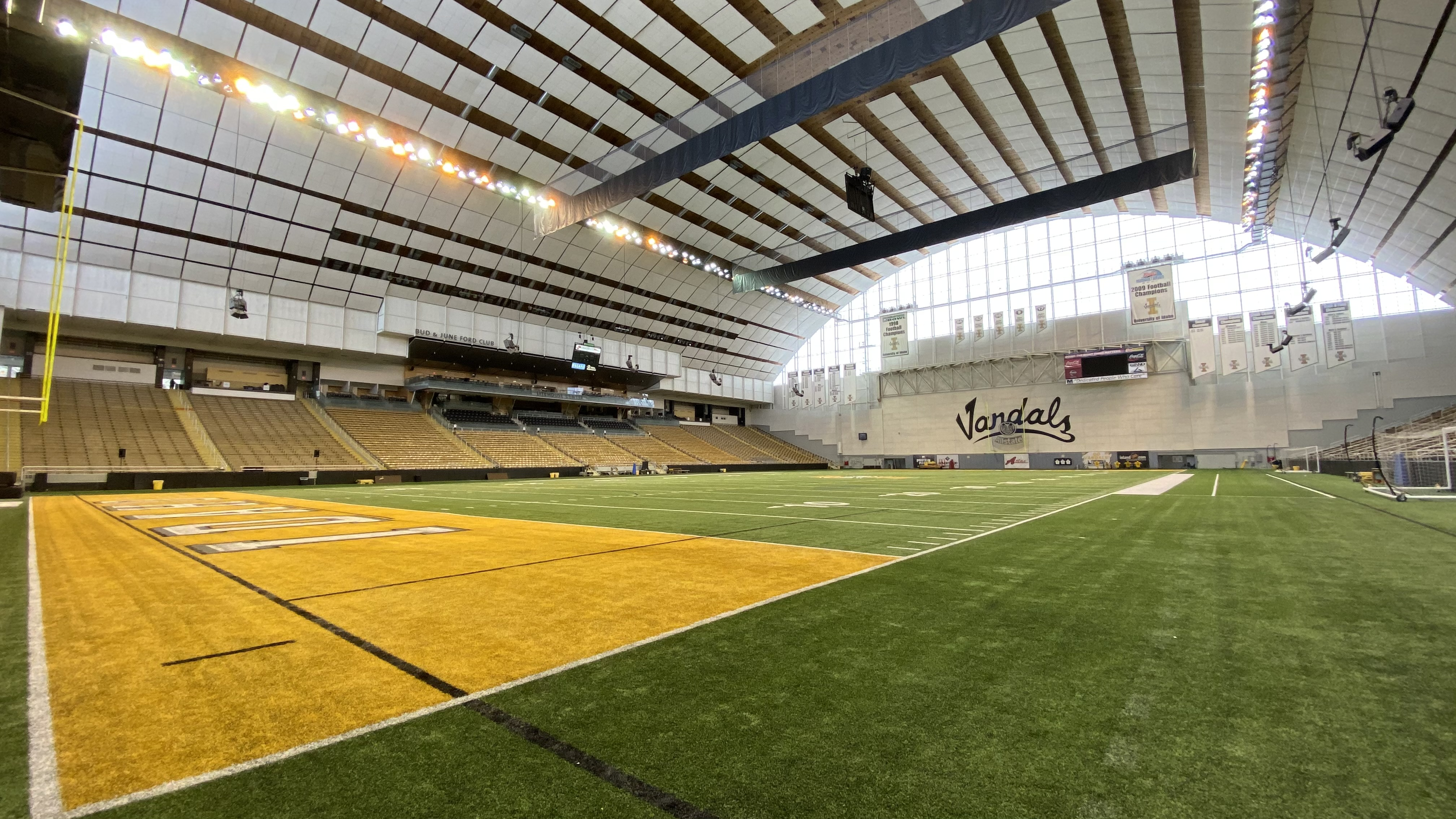
Interior from northeast corner in 2020

When not used for football, the former AstroTurf football field was rolled up in about an hour to reveal 93,000 square feet (2.1 acres; 0.86 hectares) of polyurethane tartan surface, used for indoor tennis and track & field. The five-lane track is 317 yards (290 m) in length, and nine tennis courts are lined on its infield. Basketball and volleyball courts are also lined on the tartan infield. The AstroTurf was spooled onto a large field-width reel at the base of the west wall.

In 1990, the original synthetic turf (3M Tartan Turf) of 1972 was replaced after 18 seasons, which included three years outdoors. At this time, the goal posts were modified and attached to the walls, eliminating the conventional center support post. In 2007, the AstroTurf was replaced with RealGrass Pro, a next-generation infilled synthetic turf similar to FieldTurf. Unlike the carpet-like AstroTurf, the infilled synthetic turf is not easily rolled up in a continuous reel, and must be removed in sections. The turf sections are five yards (4.6 m) in width, running from sideline to sideline, attached to each other with velcro. Other stadiums with RealGrass Pro include Texas Stadium (the former home of the Dallas Cowboys), and the Alamodome in San Antonio.

Life and safety upgrades to the Kibbie Dome began in the spring of 2009. The west wall was replaced with a non-combustible construction assembly; translucent plastic panels on the upper half and opaque metal siding on the lower. Concurrent with the end-wall replacement, a range of interior life safety work took place: field level exiting in the new west wall, addition of handrails in the seating aisles, provision of the required smoke exhaust systems; and other life safety and code mitigation improvements. The second phase of the project was completed in 2011 with the replacement of the east wall. A premium seating area (the Bud & June Ford Clubroom) was established in 2011 in the former press box area above the south grandstand; a new press box was constructed above the north grandstand.

Prior to the 2022 season, a new LED lighting package was installed.

== Basketball ==
The stadium has also served as the home of the Vandal basketball teams, providing increased seating capacity over the venerable Memorial Gym (built in 1928), a block to the east. The basketball court is positioned at midfield on the south sideline, in front of the press box and the south grandstand, with temporary seating on the north, east, and west. The first basketball game was played 50 years ago against WSU on January 21, 1976, commemorated with an alumni game which included Vandal great Gus Johnson. The main court was originally smooth tartan rubber, poured directly onto the pavement floor, resulting in a very hard and unforgiving surface, but resulted in a tremendous home court advantage under head coach Don Monson in the early 1980s. After nine seasons, it was replaced with a conventional hardwood floor in the fall of 1984, acquired from the University of Arizona in Tucson. During basketball games, the converted Kibbie Dome was referred to as the Cowan Spectrum, named for Bob and Jan Cowan, who financed the final basketball configuration, from 2000 until basketball moved to the new ICCU Arena. Since February 2001, the basketball layout was separated from the rest of the stadium by massive black curtains to give the court a more intimate "stadium-within-a-stadium" feel, with a reduced seating capacity of 7,000. Temporary OES scoreboards were placed over the north and south stands during games.

From January 1980 to February 1983, the Vandals won 43 consecutive home games. A Big Sky record attendance of 11,800 witnessed the streak end against Montana.

The venue hosted three Big Sky Conference men's basketball tournaments (by winning the regular season title), in 1981, 1982, and 1993. (The Vandals departed the Big Sky for the Big West in 1996, then to the WAC in 2005 before returning its non-football sports to the Big Sky in 2014, and football in 2018.)

In October 2021, Idaho opened the new Idaho Central Credit Union Arena, north of the west end of the Kibbie Dome, to house men's and women's basketball. The first game in the new arena was a men's exhibition against NAIA member Evergreen State on October 29. The first regular-season game was a men's game against Long Beach State, coached by Don Monson's son Dan, himself a former Vandals football player.

== Additions ==
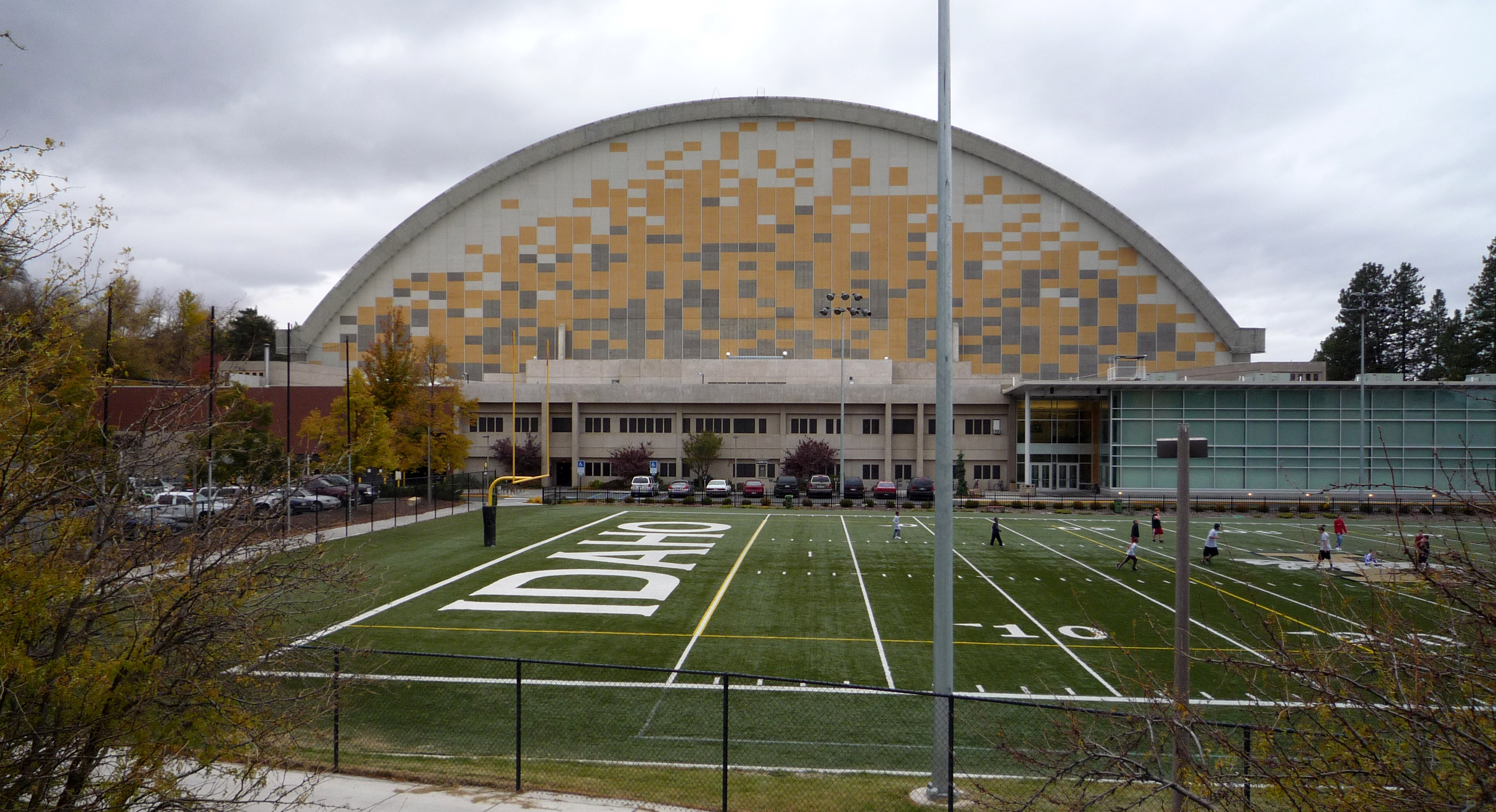
The east side of the Kibbie Dome features the East End Addition (center), the Vandal Athletic Center (right), and SprinTurf practice fields. (2008)

Since its enclosure in 1975, the Kibbie Dome has undergone several significant additions. The East End Addition was completed in the fall of 1982, providing the entire athletic department with locker rooms, offices, a weight room, athletic training facility, and equipment room. The formal dedication and open house for the $3.9 million addition was held in late October. Until the addition, the football and basketball teams, both Vandals and visitors, dressed in the Memorial Gym and made the lengthy walk (or run) west to the Kibbie Dome, often in rain or snow. This had been the practice for UI football for over 40 years, since the opening of Neale Stadium in 1937. Bill Kibbie also made a significant donation for this project in 1979.

In April 2004, the facilities were again enhanced with the addition of the 8,000-square-foot (740 m^{2}) Vandal Athletic Center, designed by Opsis Architecture, home to the Norm and Becky Iverson Speed and Strength Center; the renovation of the men's and women's basketball, football, and volleyball locker rooms, and the addition of a state-of-the-art hydrotherapy pool (ARC).

== Adjacent practice fields ==
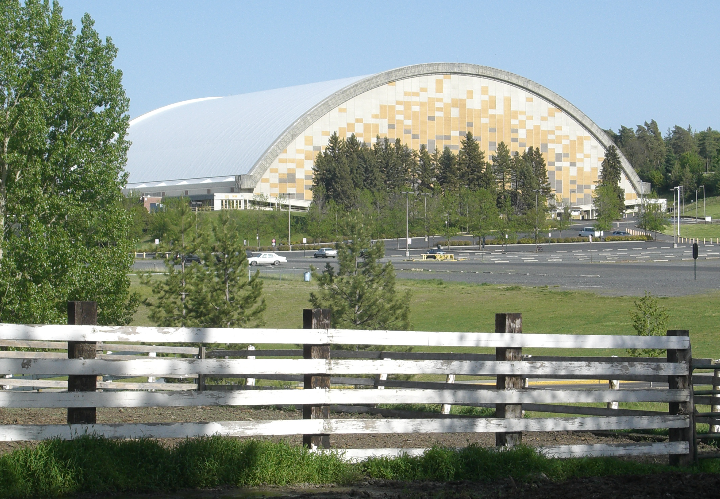
Kibbie Dome from the far west (2007)

August 2005 saw the installation of infilled SprinTurf on the former natural grass practice field east of the Kibbie Dome. The days of "off-limits" were eliminated, as UI students acquired state-of-the-art playing fields available for year-round use. A field that previously had just 300 usable hours annually as an "intercollegiate athletics only" field (primarily for natural turf varsity football practice), is now available for up to 2,000 hours per year. The project was funded through the Kibbie Dome turf replacement fund; the $1.2 million SprinTurf project included lighting and fencing. The two 75-yard (69 m) fields are adequate for team practice for football (and soccer, lacrosse, rugby, and other sports) as well as for intramural competition, but short enough to have two fields in the space available. Each field is a full half-field (with end zone & goal post) plus an additional 15 yards (14 m) beyond the 50-yard line. An unmarked 10-yard (9 m) median separates the two fields; the total length, with end zones, is 160 yards (146 m) and runs north–south. The former natural turf fields were lined as a regulation football field running north–south, with a half field at the north end running east–west. An added benefit of the synthetic surface is an estimated $50,000 annual savings in field maintenance costs.

The fields were renovated in 2021 with the installation of a new AstroTurf RootZone 3D3 playing surface, as well as a Brock Pad PowerBase Pro.

== Nearby facilities ==
On the west side of the Kibbie Dome is the Dan O'Brien outdoor track & field stadium, which hosted its first meet in 1972, and was renamed in 1996 for the Olympic gold medalist, three-time world champion, and former world record holder in the decathlon. A concrete grandstand at the finish area (southeast corner) has a seating capacity of 1,000. The first all-weather surface lasted less than a decade and was replaced in 1980. The facility underwent a major renovation in 2011 to host the 2012 WAC outdoor championships. South of the Dome is the university's 18-hole golf course, a challenging track due to its rolling Palouse terrain. A par-72 course with terraced fairways and significant changes in elevation, its back tees measure 6,637 yards (6,069 m), with a course rating of 72.3, and a 128 slope rating. The course opened in 1937 with nine holes, then expanded from 1968–70, with the present clubhouse opening in 1969. To the east is the Memorial Gymnasium (1928), the swim center and the physical education building (both 1970), and six outdoor tennis courts. Four additional tennis courts are on the east side of campus, at the southeast corner of the Administration Lawn. As noted earlier, ICCU Arena is immediately to the north of the Dome.

About a half-mile north (800 m) of the Dome are expansive natural grass intramural fields, west of the Wallace dormitories. Included here is the women's soccer field, in the far northwest corner bounded by Perimeter Road. Towards the center is Guy Wicks Field, the baseball field since the late 1960s. (Baseball was dropped as a varsity sport after the 1980 season after more than 80 seasons, but continues as a club sport.)

== See also ==
- List of NCAA Division I FCS football stadiums
- List of NCAA Division I basketball arenas
