= 1989 Northeastern Huskies football team =

American college football season

1989 Northeastern Huskies football
- Conference: Independent
- Record: 3–7
- Head coach: Paul Pawlak (9th season)
- Home stadium: Parsons Field

1989 NCAA Division I-AA independents football standings
	Conf.			Overall
Team	W	L	T	W		L		T
No. 1 Georgia Southern ^		–		15	–	0	–	0
No. 14 Youngstown State ^		–		9	–	4	–	0
No. T–10 William & Mary ^		–		8	–	3	–	1
Liberty		–		7	–	3	–	0
Western Kentucky		–		6	–	5	–	0
James Madison		–		5	–	4	–	1
Lamar		–		5	–	5	–	0
Arkansas State		–		5	–	6	–	0
Nicholls State		–		5	–	6	–	0
Samford		–		5	–	6	–	0
Northeastern		–		3	–	7	–	0
Fordham		–		2	–	6	–	0
Towson State		–		2	–	8	–	0
^ – NCAA Division I-AA playoff participant; Rankings from NCAA Division I-AA Football Committee poll

The 1989 Northeastern Huskies football team was an American football team that represented Northeastern University as an independent during the 1989 NCAA Division I-AA football season. Led by ninth-year head coach Paul Pawlak, the team compiled a 3–7 record.

== Schedule ==
Date	Opponent	Site	Result	Attendance	Source
September 9	Towson State	Parsons Field; Brookline, MA	W 20–17	3,030	
September 16	Delaware State	Parsons Field; Brookline, MA	L 3–11		
September 23	at Rhode Island	Meade Stadium; Kingston, RI	W 17–0	5,662	
September 30	at Cornell	Schoellkopf Field; Ithaca, NY	W 20–0	12,000	
October 7	New Hampshire	Parsons Field; Brookline, MA	L 28–31		
October 14	at No. 18 Youngstown State	Stambaugh Stadium; Youngstown, OH	L 0–44	9,387	
October 21	at Lehigh	Goodman Stadium; Bethlehem, PA	L 13–33	11,223	
October 28	UMass	Parsons Field; Brookline, MA	L 27–31	7,060	
November 4	at No. 6 Holy Cross	Fitton Field; Worcester, MA	L 13–46	8,335	
November 11	No. 10 Maine	Parsons Field; Brookline, MA	L 26–29		
Rankings from NCAA Division I-AA Football Committee Poll released prior to the game
