= 1989 Richmond Spiders football team =

American college football season

1989 Richmond Spiders football
- Conference: Yankee Conference
- Record: 1–10 (0–8 Yankee)
- Head coach: Jim Marshall (1st season)
- Home stadium: UR Stadium

1989 Yankee Conference football standings
	Conf.					Overall
Team	W		L		T	W		L		T
No. 8 Maine +^	6	–	2	–	0	9	–	3	–	0
No. 18 Connecticut +	6	–	2	–	0	8	–	3	–	0
No. 16 Villanova +^	6	–	2	–	0	8	–	4	–	0
New Hampshire	5	–	3	–	0	7	–	3	–	0
Delaware	5	–	3	–	0	7	–	4	–	0
Boston University	4	–	4	–	0	4	–	7	–	0
UMass	3	–	5	–	0	5	–	5	–	1
Rhode Island	1	–	7	–	0	3	–	8	–	0
Richmond	0	–	8	–	0	1	–	10	–	0
+ – Conference co-champions; ^ – NCAA Division I-AA playoff participant; Rankings from NCAA Division I-AA Football Committee poll

The 1989 Richmond Spiders football team was an American football team that represented the University of Richmond as a member of the Yankee Conference during the 1989 NCAA Division I-AA football season. In their first season under head coach Jim Marshall, Richmond compiled a 1–10 record, with a mark of 0–8 in conference play, finishing in ninth place in the Yankee.

== Schedule ==
Date	Opponent	Site	Result	Attendance	Source
September 2	Villanova	UR Stadium; Richmond, VA	L 17–20	13,068	
September 9	Rhode Island	UR Stadium; Richmond, VA	L 14–45	12,854	
September 16	at James Madison*	JMU Stadium; Harrisonburg, VA (rivalry)	L 0–31	10,088	
September 23	VMI*	UR Stadium; Richmond, VA (rivalry)	W 27–22	14,163	
September 30	at No. 8 Maine	Alumni Field; Orono, ME	L 16–41	7,169	
October 7	Boston University	UR Stadium; Richmond, VA	L 0–35	14,506	
October 21	at New Hampshire	Cowell Stadium; Durham, NH	L 7–21	6,325	
October 28	Connecticut	UR Stadium; Richmond, VA	L 3–13	12,354	
November 4	at UMass	McGuirk Stadium; Hadley, MA	L 14–17	5,926	
November 11	at Delaware	Delaware Stadium; Newark, DE	L 17–33	20,666	
November 18	at No. 11 William & Mary*	Cary Field; Williamsburg, VA (rivalry)	L 10–22	13,110	
*Non-conference game; Rankings from NCAA Division I-AA Football Committee Poll released prior to the game
