= Erk Russell =

American multi-sport athlete (1926–2006)

Biographical details
- Born: July 23, 1926; Ensley, Alabama, U.S.
- Died: September 8, 2006 (aged 80); Statesboro, Georgia, U.S.

Playing career

Football
- 1946–1949: Auburn

Basketball
- 1947–1948: Auburn

Baseball
- 1949: Auburn
- Position: End (football)

Coaching career (HC unless noted)

Football
- 1958–1962: Auburn (assistant)
- 1963: Vanderbilt (assistant)
- 1964–1980: Georgia (DC)
- 1982–1989: Georgia Southern

Baseball
- 1959–1962: Auburn

Head coaching record
- Overall: 83–22–1 (college football); 59–37–1 (college baseball)
- Tournaments: 16–2 (NCAA D-I-AA playoffs)

Accomplishments and honors

Championships
- 3 NCAA Division I-AA (1985–1986, 1989)

Awards
- AFCA Division I-AA Coach of the Year (1989); Eddie Robinson Award (1989); Florida–Georgia Hall of Fame

Erskine "Erk" Russell (July 23, 1926 – September 8, 2006) was an American football, basketball, track and baseball player and coach. He was also the defensive coordinator for the Georgia Bulldogs for seventeen years (1964–1981) and head football coach (1981–1989) of the Georgia Southern Eagles. He was also the head coach at Grady High School in Atlanta, Georgia in the 1950s. He graduated from Auburn University where he earned ten varsity letters. He was the last four-sport letterman in the college's history.

As the first head coach of Georgia Southern Eagles football team after a 40-year dormancy, Russell established a standard of excellence during his tenure, bringing them to three NCAA Division I-AA championships. Under his guidance the Georgia Southern Eagles became the first 15–0 team of the 20th century. His motto was "Just one more time."

Erk Russell was the Georgia Sports Hall of Fame Coach of the Year for 1984–1986; was inducted into the Georgia Sports Hall of Fame in 1987; inducted into the Alabama Sports Hall of Fame in 1991; became USA Today's Georgia Coach of the Year and Coach of the Decade for 1989; In 1989, he also became the Chevrolet-CBS Sports I-AA Coach of the Year; and in 1996 he was an Olympic torch bearer for the Atlanta Games.

Russell died in Statesboro, Georgia, on September 8, 2006, following a stroke at age 80. His funeral took place two days later at Paulson Stadium with over 2,000 fans, friends, family, and former players present. His remains were cremated.

== Early life ==
Russell grew up playing football in Ensley Park and later at Ensley High School. He was the last four-sport letterman at Auburn University.

=== The Junkyard Dawgs ===
After talking with a friend, Jimmy Matthews, Erk decided to use the phrase “Junkyard Dawgs” as motivation for his defense after an uncharacteristically poor season in 1974. After Erk received Vince Dooley's okay, Russell called Roger Dancz, the director of Georgia's Redcoat Marching Band, and suggested that if the Bulldogs ever did something good on the field, how about cranking up a few bars of Jim Croce's "Bad, Bad Leroy Brown".

From the American Football Coaches Association's Defensive Football Strategies, the chapter penned by Erk defines the Junkyard Dawgs, "By our own definition, a Junkyard Dog is a dog completely dedicated to his task, that of defending his goal line. Further, he is very often a reject (from the offense) or the runt of the litter. Nobody wants him, and he is hungry. We had three walk-ons, four QBs, and three running backs in our original Junkyard Dog starting cast, which averaged 208 pounds across the front. In short, a Junkyard Dog is one who must stretch and strain all of his potential just to survive. Then he can think about being good."

Georgia went 9–3 in 1975 and brought home the third SEC title for Dooley in 1976.

During the 17 years that Erk served as Georgia Bulldogs' defensive coordinator, the 'Dawgs played 192 games and held the opposition to 17 or fewer points in 135 of them. In 74 of those contests, the defense kept the other team's scoring in the single digits, including 27 shutouts. Coach Russell's Georgia defenses allowed more than 28 points just 18 times in 17 seasons.

The Godfather of Soul, James Brown, even recorded "Dooley's Junkyard Dawgs", and belted out the tune during the half time of the Florida-Georgia game in the Gator Bowl Stadium.

=== Player communication ===
Russell was notorious for his communication and motivational nature among his players. He was known for sending out calendars to his players over the summer, reminding them to be in shape for the start of practice and suggesting a humorous workout regimen that would include entries such as: "Run three miles, hate Georgia Tech four times."

He also came up with all sorts of folksy sayings that somehow seemed to work on the younger generation. Russell was the one who coined the phrase "Junkyard Dawgs" for Georgia's undersized defense. He came up with T-shirts that had "TEAM" printed in large letters and "me" in small letters. And he always told his players, "If we score, we may win. If they never score, we'll never lose." Erk Russell other inspirational quotes consist of, "The best way to win a game is not to lose it." and "The brotherhood of football ... is the strongest brotherhood known to man as far as I'm concerned."

During a road game at Georgia Tech, Coach Russell saw a Yellow Jacket trainer in a sweatshirt reading "G.T.A.A."---"Georgia Tech Athletic Association"---and came up with the idea of rearranging the letters to produce a memorable slogan: "G.A.T.A."---"Get After Their Asses".

Perhaps the most lasting impression was Russell ramming his bald dome into a helmeted player to celebrate a turnover or key play, leaving his forehead drenched in blood.

Coach Russell was a motivator who did not forget being someone who molded young men in a university setting, he was a teacher first. He passed life lessons and defensive techniques to his players.

While Vince Dooley was still contemplating the dismissal of several Bulldogs after the infamous hog incident of 1980, Coach Russell was the one who saw how it could be used to bring the team together. When Len Bias died of an overdose in 1986; as head coach of Georgia Southern, Coach Russell conveyed the dangers of drug use by throwing a rattlesnake on the floor in a team meeting to make sure his analogy would be remembered.

=== The Miracle Worker ===
Russell appeared in line to take over as Georgia's head coach when Dooley got a lucrative offer from Auburn, their alma mater. But Dooley decided to stay at Georgia, and Russell was lured to what was then Georgia Southern College to restart a program dormant for 40 years. After three years as a club team, Russell led the program into Division I-AA in 1984.

Russell was forced to build the program with a shoestring budget. There was not enough money for game and practice pants, so Russell's Eagles were forced to use their white practice pants as their game pants as well. He bought solid blue helmets and had his players put a stripe of tape down the middle. With no money for transportation to home games, the Eagles had to make do with surplus school buses bought from Bulloch County for only a dollar apiece.

Despite such hardships, Russell didn't take long to turn the Eagles into a powerhouse. In only their second year of existence, the Eagles won the national title. They would add two more under Russell's watch, in 1986 and 1989. Paul Johnson, future head coach of Georgia Southern, Navy, and Georgia Tech, served as offensive coordinator for the first two championship teams. Len Gravelson handled the defense, although Russell was arguably the man in charge. Both men would leave following the 1986 championship. Russell's bald head, coupled with the fact that he coached the Eagles, gave him the nickname "The Bald Eagle".

After the Eagles moved to Division I-AA in 1984, he fashioned a 70–14 (.825) mark. Russell averaged 10.4 wins per season. He entered the 1989 season as America's winningest coach, orchestrator of two national championships, 68 wins and 14 All-America selections—all during a seven-year period. In the ensuing 105 days, extended Division I's longest home win streak from 26 to 37 games, en route to winning a third national title and becoming the only 15–0 college team of the 20th century. Russell retired after that season with a record of 83–22–1 (.788).

Russell briefly cut his ties with Georgia Southern after head coach Mike Sewak fired his son Rusty from the coaching staff in 2004. In 2006, with the hire of new Head Coach Brian VanGorder, he was reunited with the program. Russell died on the morning of September 8, 2006, after suffering a stroke while driving his car near his Statesboro home. Russell had addressed the football team on the night prior to his death.

== Posthumously ==
Georgia Southern University and thousands of friends, family, and fans gathered at Paulson Stadium to mourn the passing of Erk Russell, one of America's most exciting and successful college football coaches. The cause of death was a stroke while pulling out of a gas station (The Country Store) on the west side of Statesboro off of Cypress Lake Road. He frequented the store daily and was commonly seen there daily playing scratch off lotto tickets and smoking a cigar while sitting at a table with friends. He greeted fellow customers with a friendly smile and handshake that some say was much stronger than a man his age should have had. It was told that he frequented the store so much that the owners let him answer the phone.

=== Victory cigars ===
Cigars were a staple of Erk Russell's image. Russell claimed that his favorite brand of cigars were "OPs", which he joked stood for "other people's". He made a point to smoke a cigar after every Eagle victory that he was involved in. Eagle fans around the U.S. are known to celebrate in the same manner as a tribute to Russell.

=== Memorials ===
Sign at the entrance to Paulson Stadium dedicating the Athletic Fields in honor of him.

In honor of Russell, Georgia Southern University renamed the area encompassing Allen E. Paulson Stadium, the Gene Bishop Field House, Cowart Building and the soccer and track stadium "Erk Russell Athletic Park." Furthermore, a bronze bust and statue of Russell are now displayed at the stadium.

In 2007, the Georgia General Assembly passed a resolution which included the designation of a section of State Route 26 coming into Statesboro as the "Erk Russell Highway."

== Head coaching record ==
=== College football ===
Year	Team	Overall	Conference	Standing	Bowl/playoffs	NCAA^{#}
Georgia Southern Eagles (NCAA Division I-AA independent) (1982–1989)
1982	Georgia Southern	7–3–1				
1983	Georgia Southern	6–5				
1984	Georgia Southern	8–3				
1985	Georgia Southern	13–2			W NCAA Division I-AA Championship	9
1986	Georgia Southern	13–2			W NCAA Division I-AA Championship	4
1987	Georgia Southern	9–4			L NCAA Division I-AA Quarterfinal	6
1988	Georgia Southern	12–3			L NCAA Division I-AA Championship	2
1989	Georgia Southern	15–0			W NCAA Division I-AA Championship	1
Georgia Southern:		83–22–1				
Total:		83–22–1				
National championship Conference title Conference division title or championship game berth

== Books ==
Russell co-authored two books:

- Erk: Football, Fans & Friends (1991) ISBN 1-56352-019-2
- Defensive Football Strategies (2000) ISBN 0-7360-0142-5
