= Jim Marshall (coach) =

American football coach

Playing career
- 1965–1968: Bowling Green
- 1969: Tennessee–Martin
- Position: Center

Coaching career (HC unless noted)
- 1977: North Alabama (OL)
- 1978: Tennessee–Martin (OC)
- 1979–1985: Richmond (OC)
- 1986: UTEP (OC)
- 1987: Louisiana Tech (OC/OL)
- 1988: Tulane (RB/RC)
- 1989–1994: Richmond
- 1995: Memphis (TE/OL/RC)
- 1996: Memphis (OL)
- 1997–1999: Tennessee–Martin
- 2001: Arkansas State (OL)
- 2006: Alabama State (OL)
- 2007–2009: Incarnate Word (OC/OL)
- 2010–2014: UTSA (OL)

Head coaching record
- Overall: 21–78

Accomplishments and honors

Awards
- Yankee Conference Coach of the Year (1992)

Jim Marshall is an American former football coach. He served as the head football coach at the University of Richmond from 1989 to 1994 and at the University of Tennessee at Martin from 1997 to 1999, compiling a career college football record of 21–78.

Marshall began his coaching career at Big Walnut High School in Sunbury, Ohio and Marist School in Brookhaven, Georgia.

== Head coaching record ==
Year	Team	Overall	Conference	Standing	Bowl/playoffs
Richmond Spiders (Yankee Conference) (1989–1994)
1989	Richmond	1–10	0–8	9th	
1990	Richmond	1–10	1–7	9th	
1991	Richmond	2–9	2–6	T–7th	
1992	Richmond	7–4	5–3	T–3rd	
1993	Richmond	5–6	3–5	4th (Mid-Atlantic)	
1994	Richmond	3–8	1–7	6th (Mid-Atlantic)	
Richmond:		19–47	12–36		
Tennessee–Martin Skyhawks (Ohio Valley Conference) (1997–1999)
1997	Tennessee–Martin	1–10	0–7	8th	
1998	Tennessee–Martin	0–11	0–7	8th	
1999	Tennessee–Martin	1–10	0–7	8th	
Tennessee–Martin:		2–31	0–21		
Total:		21–78			
