= 1989 North Carolina A&T Aggies football team =

American college football season

1989 North Carolina A&T Aggies football
- Conference: Mid-Eastern Athletic Conference
- Record: 5–6 (2–4 MEAC)
- Head coach: Bill Hayes (2nd season)
- Home stadium: Aggie Stadium

1989 Mid-Eastern Athletic Conference football standings
	Conf.					Overall
Team	W		L		T	W		L		T
Delaware State $	5	–	1	–	0	7	–	4	–	0
Howard	4	–	2	–	0	8	–	3	–	0
Florida A&M	3	–	3	–	0	6	–	5	–	0
Bethune–Cookman	3	–	3	–	0	5	–	5	–	0
South Carolina State	3	–	3	–	0	5	–	6	–	0
North Carolina A&T	2	–	4	–	0	5	–	6	–	0
Morgan State	1	–	5	–	0	3	–	7	–	1
$ – Conference champion

The 1989 North Carolina A&T Aggies football team represented North Carolina A&T State University as a member of the Mid-Eastern Athletic Conference (MEAC) during the 1989 NCAA Division I-AA football season. Led by second-year head coach Bill Hayes, the Aggies compiled an overall record of 5–6, with a mark of 2–4 in conference play, and finished tied for sixth in the MEAC.

== Schedule ==
Date	Opponent	Site	Result	Attendance	Source
September 2	North Carolina Central*	Aggie Stadium; Greensboro, NC (rivalry)	W 24–6	16,917	
September 9	at Winston-Salem State*	Bowman Gray Stadium; Winston-Salem, NC (rivalry)	L 19–48		
September 16	District of Columbia*	Aggie Stadium; Greensboro, NC	W 44–6		
September 23	at Morgan State	Hughes Stadium; Baltimore, MD	L 7–27	4,200	
September 30	Norfolk State*	Aggie Stadium; Greensboro, NC	L 0–6		
October 7	Florida A&M	Aggie Stadium; Greensboro, NC	L 20–24	19,715	
October 14	at Fayetteville State*	Bronco Stadium; Fayetteville, NC	W 20–13		
October 21	Howard	Aggie Stadium; Greensboro, NC	W 13–9		
October 28	at Bethune–Cookman	Municipal Stadium; Daytona Beach, FL	W 14–10	9,000	
November 4	at No. 18 Delaware State	Alumni Stadium; Dover, DE	L 7–30	7,216	
November 18	at South Carolina State	Oliver C. Dawson Stadium; Orangeburg, SC (rivalry)	L 32–35	12,684	
*Non-conference game; Rankings from NCAA Division I-AA Football Committee Poll released prior to the game
