= 1989 Lehigh Engineers football team =

American college football season

1989 Lehigh Engineers football
- Conference: Colonial League
- Record: 5–6 (1–3 Colonial)
- Head coach: Hank Small (4th season)
- Captains: Vance Cassell; John Masonis
- Home stadium: Goodman Stadium

1989 Colonial League football standings
	Conf.					Overall
Team	W		L		T	W		L		T
No. T–4 Holy Cross $	4	–	0	–	0	10	–	1	–	0
Bucknell	2	–	2	–	0	5	–	5	–	0
Lafayette	2	–	2	–	0	5	–	5	–	0
Lehigh	1	–	3	–	0	5	–	6	–	0
Colgate	1	–	3	–	0	4	–	7	–	0
$ – Conference champion; Rankings from NCAA Division I-AA Football Committee poll

The 1989 Lehigh Engineers football team was an American football team that represented Lehigh University during the 1989 NCAA Division I-AA football season. Lehigh tied for last in the Colonial League.

In their fourth year under head coach Hank Small, the Engineers compiled a 5–6 record. Vance Cassell and John Masonis were the team captains.

Despite posting a losing record, the Engineers outscored opponents 371 to 360. Lehigh's 1–3 conference record tied for fourth in the five-team Colonial League standings.

Lehigh played its home games at Goodman Stadium on the university's Goodman Campus in Bethlehem, Pennsylvania.

== Schedule ==
Date	Opponent	Site	Result	Attendance	Source
September 9	at Fordham*	Jack Coffey Field; Bronx, NY	W 42–7		
September 16	No. 15 UMass*	Goodman Stadium; Bethlehem, PA	L 23–42	6,000	
September 23	at Yale*	Yale Bowl; New Haven, CT	L 17–33	9,907	
September 30	Towson State*	Goodman Stadium; Bethlehem, PA	W 48–39	8,522	
October 7	at Harvard*	Harvard Stadium; Boston, MA	W 50–28	11,200	
October 14	at Bucknell	Christy Mathewson–Memorial Stadium; Lewisburg, PA	W 52–6	8,300	
October 21	Northeastern*	Goodman Stadium; Bethlehem, PA	W 33–13	11,223	
October 28	at William & Mary*	Goodman Stadium; Bethlehem, PA	L 39–55	10,824	
November 4	at Colgate	Andy Kerr Stadium; Hamilton, NY	L 30–46	5,500	
November 11	No. 6 Holy Cross	Goodman Stadium; Bethlehem, PA	L 16–55	7,727	
November 18	Lafayette	Goodman Stadium; Bethlehem, PA (The Rivalry)	L 21–36	18,623	
*Non-conference game; Rankings from the latest NCAA Division I-AA poll released prior to the game
