= 1989 Samford Bulldogs football team =

American college football season

1989 Samford Bulldogs football
- Conference: Independent
- Record: 5–6
- Head coach: Terry Bowden (3rd season)
- Offensive coordinator: Jeff Bowden (3rd season)
- Defensive coordinator: Jack Hines (3rd season)
- Home stadium: Seibert Stadium

1989 NCAA Division I-AA independents football standings
	Conf.			Overall
Team	W	L	T	W		L		T
No. 1 Georgia Southern ^		–		15	–	0	–	0
No. 14 Youngstown State ^		–		9	–	4	–	0
No. T–10 William & Mary ^		–		8	–	3	–	1
Liberty		–		7	–	3	–	0
Western Kentucky		–		6	–	5	–	0
James Madison		–		5	–	4	–	1
Lamar		–		5	–	5	–	0
Arkansas State		–		5	–	6	–	0
Nicholls State		–		5	–	6	–	0
Samford		–		5	–	6	–	0
Northeastern		–		3	–	7	–	0
Fordham		–		2	–	6	–	0
Towson State		–		2	–	8	–	0
^ – NCAA Division I-AA playoff participant; Rankings from NCAA Division I-AA Football Committee poll

The 1989 Samford Bulldogs football team was an American football team that represented Samford University as an independent during the 1989 NCAA Division I-AA football season. Led by third-year head coach Terry Bowden, the team compiled a 5–6 record.

== Schedule ==
Date	Opponent	Site	Result	Attendance	Source
September 2	No. 4 (D-II) Jacksonville State	Seibert Stadium; Homewood, AL (rivalry)	L 9–19	10,136	
September 9	at McNeese State	Cowboy Stadium; Lake Charles, LA	L 14–49		
September 16	Tennessee Tech	Seibert Stadium; Homewood, AL	W 27–23		
September 23	at Livingston	Tiger Stadium; Livingston, AL	L 28–35		
September 30	Morehead State	Seibert Stadium; Homewood, AL	W 28–35 (forfeit win)	2,430	
October 7	West Georgia	Seibert Stadium; Homewood, AL	W 28–3		
October 14	at Tennessee–Martin	Pacer Stadium; Martin, TN	W 37–33		
October 28	No. 2 Georgia Southern	Seibert Stadium; Homewood, AL	L 7–52	6,042	
November 4	at The Citadel	Johnson Hagood Stadium; Charleston, SC	L 16–35	15,214	
November 11	at Nicholls State	John L. Guidry Stadium; Thibodaux, LA	L 17–23		
November 18	East Tennessee State	Seibert Stadium; Homewood, AL	W 38–23		
Rankings from NCAA Division I-AA Football Committee Poll released prior to the game
