= 1989 Lafayette Leopards football team =

American college football season

1989 Lafayette Leopards football
- Conference: Colonial League
- Record: 5–5 (2–2 Colonial)
- Head coach: Bill Russo (9th season)
- Defensive coordinator: Mike Donnelly (2nd season)
- Captains: Frank Baur; Dwayne Norris
- Home stadium: Fisher Field

1989 Colonial League football standings
	Conf.					Overall
Team	W		L		T	W		L		T
No. T–4 Holy Cross $	4	–	0	–	0	10	–	1	–	0
Bucknell	2	–	2	–	0	5	–	5	–	0
Lafayette	2	–	2	–	0	5	–	5	–	0
Lehigh	1	–	3	–	0	5	–	6	–	0
Colgate	1	–	3	–	0	4	–	7	–	0
$ – Conference champion; Rankings from NCAA Division I-AA Football Committee poll

The 1989 Lafayette Leopards football team was an American football team that represented Lafayette College during the 1989 NCAA Division I-AA football season. Lafayette tied for second in the Colonial League.

In their ninth year under head coach Bill Russo, the Leopards compiled a 4–7 record. Frank Baur and Dwayne Norris were the team captains.

The Leopards outscored opponents 319 to 249. Lafayette's 2–2 conference record tied for second in the five-team Colonial League standings.

Lafayette played its home games at Fisher Field on College Hill in Easton, Pennsylvania.

== Schedule ==
Date	Opponent	Site	Result	Attendance	Source
September 9	Kutztown*	Fisher Field; Easton, PA	W 44–14	4,200	
September 16	No. 8 Holy Cross	Fisher Field; Easton, PA	L 21–23	10,700	
September 23	at Penn*	Franklin Field; Philadelphia, PA	L 12–25	11,513	
September 30	Columbia*	Fisher Field; Easton, PA	W 52–14	4,350	
October 7	at Cornell*	Schoellkopf Field; Ithaca, NY	L 23–24	8,000	
October 14	Fordham*	Fisher Field; Easton, PA	W 40–7	4,595	
October 21	at Army*	Michie Stadium; West Point, NY	L 20–34	40,478	
October 28	Colgate	Fisher Field; Easton, PA	W 38–33	9,815	
November 4	at Bucknell	Christy Mathewson–Memorial Stadium; Lewisburg, PA	L 33–54	3,418	
November 18	at Lehigh	Goodman Stadium; Bethlehem, PA (The Rivalry)	W 36–21	18,623	
*Non-conference game; Rankings from NCAA Division I-AA Football Committee Poll released prior to the game
