= 1989 Bucknell Bison football team =

American college football season

1989 Bucknell Bison football
- Conference: Colonial League
- Record: 5–5 (2–2 Colonial)
- Head coach: Lou Maranzana (1st season)
- Home stadium: Christy Mathewson–Memorial Stadium

1989 Colonial League football standings
	Conf.					Overall
Team	W		L		T	W		L		T
No. T–4 Holy Cross $	4	–	0	–	0	10	–	1	–	0
Bucknell	2	–	2	–	0	5	–	5	–	0
Lafayette	2	–	2	–	0	5	–	5	–	0
Lehigh	1	–	3	–	0	5	–	6	–	0
Colgate	1	–	3	–	0	4	–	7	–	0
$ – Conference champion; Rankings from NCAA Division I-AA Football Committee poll

The 1989 Bucknell Bison football team represented Bucknell University as a member of the Colonial League in the 1989 NCAA Division I-AA football season. They were led by first-year head coach Lou Maranzana and played their home games at Memorial Stadium in Lewisburg, Pennsylvania, rededicated as Christy Mathewson–Memorial Stadium on September 30 in honor of one of the university's most famous alumni.

== Schedule ==
Date	Opponent	Site	Result	Attendance	Source
September 16	at Fordham*	Coffey Field; Bronx, NY	W 31–7	3,012	
September 23	Cornell*	Memorial Stadium; Lewisburg, PA	L 9–20	2,433	
September 30	Dartmouth*	Christy Mathewson–Memorial Stadium; Lewisburg, PA	W 36–20	4,280	
October 7	at Towson State*	Minnegan Stadium; Towson, MD	L 23–29		
October 14	Lehigh	Christy Mathewson–Memorial Stadium; Lewisburg, PA	L 6–52	8,300	
October 21	at Penn*	Franklin Field; Philadelphia, PA	L 24–25	21,807	
October 28	at Columbia*	Wien Stadium; New York, NY	W 27–12	3,030	
November 4	Lafayette	Christy Mathewson–Memorial Stadium; Lewisburg, PA	W 54–33	3,418	
November 11	at Colgate	Andy Kerr Stadium; Hamilton, NY	W 37–27	3,000	
November 18	No. 4 Holy Cross	Christy Mathewson–Memorial Stadium; Lewisburg, PA	L 6–35	4,662	
*Non-conference game; Rankings from NCAA Division I-AA Football Committee Poll released prior to the game
