= 1989 Boston University Terriers football team =

American college football season

1989 Boston University Terriers football
- Conference: Yankee Conference
- Record: 4–7 (4–4 Yankee)
- Head coach: Chris Palmer (2nd season)
- Offensive coordinator: Tony Sparano (1st season)
- Home stadium: Nickerson Field

1989 Yankee Conference football standings
	Conf.					Overall
Team	W		L		T	W		L		T
No. 8 Maine +^	6	–	2	–	0	9	–	3	–	0
No. 18 Connecticut +	6	–	2	–	0	8	–	3	–	0
No. 16 Villanova +^	6	–	2	–	0	8	–	4	–	0
New Hampshire	5	–	3	–	0	7	–	3	–	0
Delaware	5	–	3	–	0	7	–	4	–	0
Boston University	4	–	4	–	0	4	–	7	–	0
UMass	3	–	5	–	0	5	–	5	–	1
Rhode Island	1	–	7	–	0	3	–	8	–	0
Richmond	0	–	8	–	0	1	–	10	–	0
+ – Conference co-champions; ^ – NCAA Division I-AA playoff participant; Rankings from NCAA Division I-AA Football Committee poll

The 1989 Boston University Terriers football team was an American football team that represented Boston University as a member of the Yankee Conference during the 1989 NCAA Division I-AA football season. In their second season under head coach Chris Palmer, the Terriers compiled a 4–7 record (4–4 against conference opponents), finished in sixth place in the Yankee Conference, and outscored opponents by a total of 292 to 271.

== Schedule ==
Date	Opponent	Site	Result	Attendance	Source
September 9	No. 5 Delaware	Nickerson Field; Boston, MA	L 21–28		
September 15	at No. 7 (D-II) West Chester*	John A. Farrell Stadium; West Chester, PA	L 19–20		
September 23	at Dartmouth*	Memorial Field; Hanover, NH	L 27–28	4,923	
September 30	UMass	Nickerson Field; Boston, MA	W 41–19	5,655	
October 7	at Richmond	University of Richmond Stadium; Richmond, VA	W 35–0	14,506	
October 14	vs. No. T–13 William & Mary*	Foreman Field; Norfolk, VA (Oyster Bowl)	L 10–13		
October 21	Rhode Island	Nickerson Field; Boston, MA	W 34–31 ^{2OT}	5,545	
October 28	at New Hampshire	Cowell Stadium; Durham, NH	L 35–38	4,490	
November 4	No. 8 Maine	Nickerson Field; Boston, MA	W 30–28		
November 11	at Connecticut	Memorial Stadium; Storrs, CT	L 30–38		
November 18	at Villanova	Villanova Stadium; Villanova, PA	L 10–28	8,194	
*Non-conference game; Rankings from NCAA Division I-AA Football Committee Poll released prior to the game
