= 1989 Towson State Tigers football team =

American college football season

1989 Towson State Tigers football
- Conference: Independent
- Record: 2–8
- Head coach: Phil Albert (18th season)
- Home stadium: Minnegan Stadium

1989 NCAA Division I-AA independents football standings
	Conf.			Overall
Team	W	L	T	W		L		T
No. 1 Georgia Southern ^		–		15	–	0	–	0
No. 14 Youngstown State ^		–		9	–	4	–	0
No. T–10 William & Mary ^		–		8	–	3	–	1
Liberty		–		7	–	3	–	0
Western Kentucky		–		6	–	5	–	0
James Madison		–		5	–	4	–	1
Lamar		–		5	–	5	–	0
Arkansas State		–		5	–	6	–	0
Nicholls State		–		5	–	6	–	0
Samford		–		5	–	6	–	0
Northeastern		–		3	–	7	–	0
Fordham		–		2	–	6	–	0
Towson State		–		2	–	8	–	0
^ – NCAA Division I-AA playoff participant; Rankings from NCAA Division I-AA Football Committee poll

The 1989 Towson State Tigers football team was an American football team that represented Towson State University (now known as Towson University) as an independent during the 1989 NCAA Division I-AA football season. Led by 18th-year head coach Phil Albert, the team compiled a 2–8 record.

== Schedule ==
Date	Opponent	Site	Result	Attendance	Source
September 9	at Northeastern	Parsons Field; Brookline, MA	L 17–20	3,030	
September 16	No. 6 (D-II) IUP	Minnegan Stadium; Towson, MD	L 0–27		
September 23	at New Haven	Dodds Stadium; West Haven, CT	L 5–9		
September 30	at Lehigh	Goodman Stadium; Bethlehem, PA	L 39–48	8,522	
October 7	Bucknell	Minnegan Stadium; Towson, MD	W 29–23		
October 14	at James Madison	JMU Stadium; Harrisonburg, VA	L 6–41	12,800	
October 21	at No. 11 Liberty	Willard May Stadium; Lynchburg, VA	L 18–37	12,750	
November 4	Rhode Island	Minnegan Stadium; Towson, MD	L 6–19	4,619	
November 11	No. 13 Delaware State	Minnegan Stadium; Towson, MD	W 35–17	1,511	
November 18	at No. 17 Youngstown State	Stambaugh Stadium; Youngstown, OH	L 7–38	5,000	
Rankings from NCAA Division I-AA Football Committee Poll released prior to the game
