= 1989 Nicholls State Colonels football team =

American college football season

1989 Nicholls State Colonels football
- Conference: Independent
- Record: 5–6
- Head coach: Phil Greco (3rd season)
- Home stadium: John L. Guidry Stadium

1989 NCAA Division I-AA independents football standings
	Conf.			Overall
Team	W	L	T	W		L		T
No. 1 Georgia Southern ^		–		15	–	0	–	0
No. 14 Youngstown State ^		–		9	–	4	–	0
No. T–10 William & Mary ^		–		8	–	3	–	1
Liberty		–		7	–	3	–	0
Western Kentucky		–		6	–	5	–	0
James Madison		–		5	–	4	–	1
Lamar		–		5	–	5	–	0
Arkansas State		–		5	–	6	–	0
Nicholls State		–		5	–	6	–	0
Samford		–		5	–	6	–	0
Northeastern		–		3	–	7	–	0
Fordham		–		2	–	6	–	0
Towson State		–		2	–	8	–	0
^ – NCAA Division I-AA playoff participant; Rankings from NCAA Division I-AA Football Committee poll

The 1989 Nicholls State Colonels football team represented Nicholls State University as an independent during the 1989 NCAA Division I-AA football season. Led by third-year head coach Phil Greco, the Colonels compiled a record of 5–6. Nicholls State played home games at John L. Guidry Stadium in Thibodaux, Louisiana.

== Schedule ==
Date	Opponent	Site	Result	Attendance	Source
September 9	at Northeast Louisiana	Malone Stadium; Monroe, LA	L 13–19		
September 16	Delta State	John L. Guidry Stadium; Thibodaux, LA	L 14–15		
September 23	at No. 17 Stephen F. Austin	Homer Bryce Stadium; Nacogdoches, TX	L 7–24		
September 30	at McNeese State	Cowboy Stadium; Lake Charles, LA	L 14–28		
October 7	at Sam Houston State	Bowers Stadium; Huntsville, TX	W 28–14		
October 14	No. 2 Georgia Southern	John L. Guidry Stadium; Thibodaux, LA	L 13–21	5,286	
October 21	Southwest Texas State	John L. Guidry Stadium; Thibodaux, LA (rivalry)	W 22–21		
October 28	at Southern	Ace W. Mumford Stadium; Baton Rouge, LA	L 28–31		
November 4	Northwestern State	John L. Guidry Stadium; Thibodaux, LA (rivalry)	W 21–15		
November 11	Samford	John L. Guidry Stadium; Thibodaux, LA	W 23–17		
November 18	Illinois State	John L. Guidry Stadium; Thibodaux, LA	W 32–28		
Rankings from NCAA Division I-AA Football Committee Poll released prior to the game

\
