= 1989 NCAA Division I-AA Football Championship Game =

College football game

1989 NCAA Division I-AA Football Championship
- I-AA National Championship Game
Stephen F. Austin Lumberjacks	Georgia Southern Eagles
(12–1–1)	(14–0)
Southland	Independent
34	37
Head coach: Lynn Graves	Head coach: Erk Russell
NCAA / Seed; 3 / 3	NCAA / Seed; 1 / 1
	1	2	3	4	Total
Stephen F. Austin	7	10	10	7	34
Georgia Southern	14	6	0	17	37
- Date: December 16, 1989
- Season: 1989
- Stadium: Paulson Stadium
- Location: Statesboro, Georgia
- Referee: Wally Righton
- Attendance: 25,725

United States TV coverage
- Network: ESPN
- Announcers: Barry Tompkins (play-by-play), Stan White (color)

The 1989 NCAA Division I-AA Football Championship Game was a postseason college football game between the Georgia Southern Eagles and the Stephen F. Austin Lumberjacks. The game was played on December 16, 1989, at Paulson Stadium in Statesboro, Georgia. The culminating game of the 1989 NCAA Division I-AA football season, it was won by Georgia Southern, 37–34.

== Teams ==
The participants of the Championship Game were the finalists of the 1989 I-AA Playoffs, which began with a 16-team bracket. The location of the final, the Georgia Southern Eagles' Paulson Stadium, had been predetermined via a three-year agreement the university reached with the NCAA in February 1989.

=== Georgia Southern Eagles ===
Georgia Southern finished their regular season with an 11–0 record. Ranked first in the final NCAA I-AA in-house poll and seeded first in the tournament, the Eagles defeated Villanova, Middle Tennessee State, and Montana to reach the final. This was the fourth appearance for Georgia Southern in a Division I-AA championship game, having two prior wins (1985 and 1986) and one prior loss (1988).

=== Stephen F. Austin Lumberjacks ===
Stephen F. Austin finished their regular season with a 9–1–1 record (5–0–1 in conference); their only loss was an away game against Boise State. Ranked third in the final NCAA I-AA in-house poll and seeded third in the tournament, the Lumberjacks defeated Grambling State, Southwest Missouri State, and second-seed Furman to reach the final. This was the first appearance for Stephen F. Austin in a Division I-AA championship game.

== Game summary ==
=== Scoring summary ===
Scoring summary

Quarter	Time	Drive			Team	Scoring information	Score	
Quarter	Time	Plays	Yards	TOP	Team	Scoring information	SFA	GSC
1	10:41	6	66	2:42	GSC	Raymond Gross 34-yard touchdown run, Mike Dowis kick good	0	7
1	7:58	6	45	2:20	GSC	Gross fumble into end zone recovered by Terrance Sorrell for a touchdown, Dowis kick good	0	14
1	0:19	6	20	2:51	SFA	Todd Hammel 1-yard touchdown run, Chuck Rawlinson kick good	7	14
2	8:50	8	83	2:56	SFA	Larry Centers 12-yard touchdown reception from Hammel, Rawlinson kick good	14	14
2	4:27	8	52	4:23	GSC	30-yard field goal by Dowis	14	17
2	0:21	6	7	2:38	GSC	37-yard field goal by Dowis	14	20
2	0:00	1	29	0:21	SFA	53-yard field goal by Rawlinson	17	20
3	11:19	5	11	2:06	SFA	53-yard field goal by Rawlinson	20	20
3	5:27	11	79	4:34	SFA	Joe Bradford 7-yard touchdown reception from Hammel, Rawlinson kick good	27	20
4	14:57	16	86	5:30	GSC	Joe Ross 2-yard touchdown run, Dowis kick good	27	27
4	12:32	5	67	2:25	SFA	Centers 46-yard touchdown reception from Hammel, Rawlinson kick good	34	27
4	5:58	6	51	1::32	GSC	Ernest Thompson 1-yard touchdown run, Dowis kick good	34	34
4	1:41	9	27	3:17	GSC	20-yard field goal by Dowis	34	37
"TOP" = time of possession. For other American football terms, see Glossary of American football.							34	37

=== Game statistics ===
	1	2	3	4	Total
Lumberjacks	7	10	10	7	34
Eagles	14	6	0	17	37

Statistics	SFA	GSC
First downs	18	21
Plays–yards	73–377	81–387
Rushes–yards	32–74	66–274
Passing yards	303	113
Passing: comp–att–int	15–41–5	7–15–0
Time of possession	26:50	33:10

Team	Category	Player	Statistics
Stephen F. Austin	Passing	Todd Hammel	15–40, 303 yds, 3 TD, 5 INT
Stephen F. Austin	Rushing	Larry Centers	22 car, 63 yds
Stephen F. Austin	Receiving	Joe Bradford	4 rec, 102 yds, 1 TD
Georgia Southern	Passing	Raymond Gross	7–15, 113 yds
Georgia Southern	Rushing	Joe Ross	31 car, 152 yds, 1 TD
Georgia Southern	Receiving	Karl Miller	2 rec, 53 yds
