= 1989 Georgia Southern Eagles football team =

American college football season

1989 Georgia Southern Eagles football

NCAA Division I-AA champion

NCAA Division I-AA Championship, W 37–34 vs. Stephen F. Austin
- Conference: Independent
- Record: 15–0
- Head coach: Erk Russell (8th season)
- Offensive coordinator: Tim Stowers (2nd season)
- Home stadium: Paulson Stadium

1989 NCAA Division I-AA independents football standings
	Conf.			Overall
Team	W	L	T	W		L		T
No. 1 Georgia Southern ^		–		15	–	0	–	0
No. 14 Youngstown State ^		–		9	–	4	–	0
No. T–10 William & Mary ^		–		8	–	3	–	1
Liberty		–		7	–	3	–	0
Western Kentucky		–		6	–	5	–	0
James Madison		–		5	–	4	–	1
Lamar		–		5	–	5	–	0
Arkansas State		–		5	–	6	–	0
Nicholls State		–		5	–	6	–	0
Samford		–		5	–	6	–	0
Northeastern		–		3	–	7	–	0
Fordham		–		2	–	6	–	0
Towson State		–		2	–	8	–	0
^ – NCAA Division I-AA playoff participant; Rankings from NCAA Division I-AA Football Committee poll

The 1989 Georgia Southern Eagles football team represented Georgia Southern College (now known as Georgia Southern University) as an independent during the 1989 NCAA Division I-AA football season. Led by Erk Russell in his eighth and final year as head coach, the Eagles compiled a record of 15–0 and won the NCAA Division I-AA Football Championship, the program's third national title in five seasons. After completing an 11–0 regular season, Georgia Southern advanced to the NCAA Division I-AA playoffs, beating Villanova in the first round, Middle Tennessee, in the quarterfinals, Montana in the semifinals, and Stephen F. Austin in NCAA Division I-AA Championship Game. The Eagles played their home games at Paulson Stadium in Statesboro, Georgia.

== Schedule ==
Date	Opponent	Rank	Site	Result	Attendance	Source
September 2	Valdosta State	No. 2	Paulson Stadium; Statesboro, GA	W 31–10	16,007	
September 9	West Georgia	No. 2	Paulson Stadium; Statesboro, GA	W 48–7	11,939	
September 16	vs. Florida A&M	No. 2	Gator Bowl; Jacksonville, FL (Bold City Classic)	W 28–0	13,481	
September 21	Middle Tennessee	No. 3	Paulson Stadium; Statesboro, GA	W 26–0	16,449	
October 7	Savannah State	No. 2	Paulson Stadium; Statesboro, GA	W 35–14	20,507	
October 14	at Nicholls State	No. 2	John L. Guidry Stadium; Thibodaux, LA	W 21–13	5,286	
October 21	UCF	No. 2	Paulson Stadium; Statesboro, GA	W 31–17	19,640	
October 28	at Samford	No. 2	Seibert Stadium; Homewood, AL	W 52–7	6,042	
November 4	at James Madison	No. 2	JMU Stadium; Harrisonburg, VA	W 36–21	11,685	
November 11	Chattanooga	No. 1	Paulson Stadium; Statesboro, GA	W 34–13	24,078	
November 18	Marshall	No. 1	Paulson Stadium; Statesboro, GA	W 63–31	16,323	
November 25	No. 16 Villanova	No. 1	Paulson Stadium; Statesboro, GA (NCAA Division I-AA First Round)	W 52–36	10,161	
December 2	No. 10 Middle Tennessee	No. 1	Paulson Stadium; Statesboro, GA (NCAA Division I-AA Quarterfinal)	W 45–3	11,272	
December 9	No. 6 Montana	No. 1	Paulson Stadium; Statesboro, GA (NCAA Division I-AA Semifinal)	W 45–15	10,421	
December 16	No. 3 Stephen F. Austin	No. 1	Paulson Stadium; Statesboro, GA (NCAA Division I-AA Championship Game)	W 37–34	25,725	
Rankings from NCAA Division I-AA Football Committee Poll released prior to the game
