= 1989 Fordham Rams football team =

American college football season

1989 Fordham Rams football
- Conference: Independent
- Record: 2–6
- Head coach: Larry Glueck (4th season)
- Home stadium: Coffey Field

1989 NCAA Division I-AA independents football standings
	Conf.			Overall
Team	W	L	T	W		L		T
No. 1 Georgia Southern ^		–		15	–	0	–	0
No. 14 Youngstown State ^		–		9	–	4	–	0
No. T–10 William & Mary ^		–		8	–	3	–	1
Liberty		–		7	–	3	–	0
Western Kentucky		–		6	–	5	–	0
James Madison		–		5	–	4	–	1
Lamar		–		5	–	5	–	0
Arkansas State		–		5	–	6	–	0
Nicholls State		–		5	–	6	–	0
Samford		–		5	–	6	–	0
Northeastern		–		3	–	7	–	0
Fordham		–		2	–	6	–	0
Towson State		–		2	–	8	–	0
^ – NCAA Division I-AA playoff participant; Rankings from NCAA Division I-AA Football Committee poll

The 1989 Fordham Rams football team was an American football team that represented Fordham University as a member of the Patriot League during the 1989 NCAA Division I-AA football season. In its fourth season under head coach Larry Glueck, the team compiled a 2–6 record and played its home games at Jack Coffey Field in The Bronx.

The 1989 season marked Fordham's return to major college football after an absence of 35 years. Fordham had been a Division III playoff team in both 1987 and 1988. The school launched a $150 million capital campaign in 1989 that included a plan to build a $20 million stadium.

Senior back Rick Hollawell concluded his college football career holding Fordham records with 36 touchdowns and 4,299 all-purpose yards.

== Schedule ==
Date	Opponent	Site	Result	Attendance	Source
September 2	at Colgate	Andy Kerr Stadium; Hamilton, NY	L 3–35	3,600	
September 9	Lehigh	Coffey Field; Bronx, NY	L 7–42	6,379	
September 16	Bucknell	Coffey Field; Bronx, NY	L 7–31	3,012	
October 7	at Davidson	Richardson Stadium; Davidson, NC	W 14–12		
October 14	at Lafayette	Fisher Stadium; Easton, PA	L 7–40	4,595	
October 21	at Princeton	Palmer Stadium; Princeton, NJ	L 20–38	12,505	
November 4	Hofstra	Coffey Field; Bronx, NY	L 35–42		
November 11	C. W. Post	Coffey Field; Bronx, NY	W 26–13		
