= 1989 Rhode Island Rams football team =

American college football season

1989 Rhode Island Rams football
- Conference: Yankee Conference
- Record: 3–8 (1–7 Yankee)
- Head coach: Bob Griffin (14th season)
- Home stadium: Meade Stadium

1989 Yankee Conference football standings
	Conf.					Overall
Team	W		L		T	W		L		T
No. 8 Maine +^	6	–	2	–	0	9	–	3	–	0
No. 18 Connecticut +	6	–	2	–	0	8	–	3	–	0
No. 16 Villanova +^	6	–	2	–	0	8	–	4	–	0
New Hampshire	5	–	3	–	0	7	–	3	–	0
Delaware	5	–	3	–	0	7	–	4	–	0
Boston University	4	–	4	–	0	4	–	7	–	0
UMass	3	–	5	–	0	5	–	5	–	1
Rhode Island	1	–	7	–	0	3	–	8	–	0
Richmond	0	–	8	–	0	1	–	10	–	0
+ – Conference co-champions; ^ – NCAA Division I-AA playoff participant; Rankings from NCAA Division I-AA Football Committee poll

The 1989 Rhode Island Rams football team was an American football team that represented the University of Rhode Island in the Yankee Conference during the 1989 NCAA Division I-AA football season. In their 14th season under head coach Bob Griffin, the Rams compiled a 3–8 record (1–7 against conference opponents) and finished in eighth place out of nine teams in the conference.

== Schedule ==
Date	Opponent	Site	Result	Attendance	Source
September 9	at Richmond	University of Richmond Stadium; Richmond, VA	W 45–14	12,854	
September 16	No. 5 Delaware	Meade Stadium; Kingston, RI	L 12–21	6,218	
September 23	Northeastern*	Meade Stadium; Kingston, RI	L 0–17	5,662	
September 30	at Brown*	Brown Stadium; Providence, RI (rivalry)	W 18–13	8,500	
October 7	at UMass	McGuirk Stadium; Hadley, MA	L 6–31	10,102	
October 14	No. 6 Maine^{†}	Meade Stadium; Kingston, RI	L 21–47	8,847	
October 21	at Boston University	Nickerson Field; Boston, MA	L 31–34 ^{2OT}	5,545	
October 28	vs. No. 17 Villanova	Arena Civica; Milan, Italy (Milano Kickoff Classic)	L 25–28	3,000	
November 4	at Towson State*	Minnegan Stadium; Towson, MD	W 19–6	4,619	
November 11	at No. 18 New Hampshire	Cowell Stadium; Durham, NH	L 0–25	4,184	
November 18	Connecticut	Meade Stadium; Kingston, RI (rivalry)	L 28–35	5,045	
*Non-conference game; ^{†}Homecoming; Rankings from NCAA Division I-AA Football Committee Poll released prior to the game
