= 1989 South Carolina State Bulldogs football team =

American college football season

1989 South Carolina State Bulldogs football
- Conference: Mid-Eastern Athletic Conference
- Record: 5–6 (3–3 MEAC)
- Head coach: Willie Jeffries (7th season)
- Home stadium: Oliver C. Dawson Stadium

1989 Mid-Eastern Athletic Conference football standings
	Conf.					Overall
Team	W		L		T	W		L		T
Delaware State $	5	–	1	–	0	7	–	4	–	0
Howard	4	–	2	–	0	8	–	3	–	0
Florida A&M	3	–	3	–	0	6	–	5	–	0
Bethune–Cookman	3	–	3	–	0	5	–	5	–	0
South Carolina State	3	–	3	–	0	5	–	6	–	0
North Carolina A&T	2	–	4	–	0	5	–	6	–	0
Morgan State	1	–	5	–	0	3	–	7	–	1
$ – Conference champion

The 1989 South Carolina State Bulldogs football team represented South Carolina State College (now known as South Carolina State University) as a member of the Mid-Eastern Athletic Conference (MEAC) during the 1989 NCAA Division I-AA football season. Led by seventh-year head coach Willie Jeffries, the Bulldogs compiled an overall record of 5–6, with a mark of 3–3 in conference play, and finished tied for third in the MEAC.

== Schedule ==
Date	Opponent	Site	Result	Attendance	Source
September 2	Presbyterian*	Oliver C. Dawson Stadium; Orangeburg, SC	W 32–27	10,017	
September 9	No. 1 Furman*	Oliver C. Dawson Stadium; Orangeburg, SC	L 7–17	15,074	
September 23	at Howard	William H. Greene Stadium; Washington, DC	L 3–10		
September 30	at No. 7 The Citadel*	Williams–Brice Stadium; Columbia, SC	L 20–31	21,853	
October 7	at Morgan State	Hughes Stadium; Baltimore, MD	W 38–12	8,765	
October 14	vs. Bethune–Cookman	Lockhart Stadium; Fort Lauderdale, FL (South Florida Football Classic)	L 30–33	8,599	
October 21	Florida A&M	Oliver C. Dawson Stadium; Orangeburg, SC	W 28–26	15,584	
October 28	Delaware State	Oliver C. Dawson Stadium; Orangeburg, SC	L 13–21		
November 4	District of Columbia*^{†}	Oliver C. Dawson Stadium; Orangeburg, SC	W 65–0	18,102	
November 11	at No. 16 Grambling State*	Eddie G. Robinson Memorial Stadium; Grambling, LA	L 10–56	4,757	
November 18	North Carolina A&T	Oliver C. Dawson Stadium; Orangeburg, SC (rivalry)	W 35–32	12,684	
*Non-conference game; ^{†}Homecoming; Rankings from NCAA Division I-AA Football Committee Poll released prior to the game
