= 1989 Villanova Wildcats football team =

American college football season

1989 Villanova Wildcats football

NCAA Division I-AA First Round, L 36–52 vs. Georgia Southern
- Conference: Yankee Conference
- Record: 8–4 (6–2 Yankee)
- Head coach: Andy Talley (5th season)
- Defensive coordinator: Dan MacNeill (2nd season)
- Home stadium: Villanova Stadium

1989 Yankee Conference football standings
	Conf.					Overall
Team	W		L		T	W		L		T
No. 8 Maine +^	6	–	2	–	0	9	–	3	–	0
No. 18 Connecticut +	6	–	2	–	0	8	–	3	–	0
No. 16 Villanova +^	6	–	2	–	0	8	–	4	–	0
New Hampshire	5	–	3	–	0	7	–	3	–	0
Delaware	5	–	3	–	0	7	–	4	–	0
Boston University	4	–	4	–	0	4	–	7	–	0
UMass	3	–	5	–	0	5	–	5	–	1
Rhode Island	1	–	7	–	0	3	–	8	–	0
Richmond	0	–	8	–	0	1	–	10	–	0
+ – Conference co-champions; ^ – NCAA Division I-AA playoff participant; Rankings from NCAA Division I-AA Football Committee poll

The 1989 Villanova Wildcats football team was an American football team that represented the Villanova University as a member of the Yankee Conference during the 1989 NCAA Division I-AA football season. In their fifth year under head coach Andy Talley, the team compiled an 8–4 record.

== Schedule ==
Date	Opponent	Rank	Site	Result	Attendance	Source
September 2	at Richmond		UR Stadium; Richmond, VA	W 20–17	13,068	
September 9	at No. 8 Holy Cross		Fitton Field; Worcester, MA	L 17–38	12,881	
September 16	at Maine		Alumni Field; Orono, ME	L 14–47	8,650	
September 23	Columbia*		Villanova Stadium; Villanova, PA	W 38–0	12,281	
October 7	Connecticut		Villanova Stadium; Villanova, PA	W 41–35 ^{6OT}	7,877	
October 14	at Delaware		Delaware Stadium; Newark, DE (rivalry)	W 20–11	17,841	
October 21	No. 12 William & Mary*		Villanova Stadium; Villanova, PA	W 20–17	9,857	
October 28	vs. Rhode Island	No. 17	Arena Civica; Milan, Italy (Milano Kickoff Classic)	W 28–25	3,000	
November 4	New Hampshire	No. T–11	Villanova Stadium; Villanova, PA	L 12–13	7,616	
November 11	UMass		Villanova Stadium; Villanova, PA	W 29–26	7,109	
November 18	Boston University		Villanova Stadium; Villanova, PA	W 28–10	8,194	
November 25	at No. 1 Georgia Southern*	No. 16	Paulson Stadium; Statesboro, GA (NCAA Division I-AA First Round)	L 36–52	10,161	
*Non-conference game; Rankings from NCAA Division I-AA Football Committee Poll released prior to the game
