= Tom Lichtenberg =

American football player and coach (1940–2013)

Biographical details
- Born: July 13, 1940; Cincinnati, Ohio, U.S.
- Died: May 26, 2013 (aged 72); Hudson, Florida, U.S.

Playing career
- 1959–1961: Louisville

Coaching career (HC unless noted)
- 1962–1971: William Mason HS (OH)
- 1972–1973: Purcell HS (OH)
- 1974–1978: Iowa State (OC)
- 1979–1980: Morehead State
- 1981–1982: Notre Dame (OC/QB/WR)
- 1986–1987: Ohio State (QB/WR)
- 1988: Northern Iowa (assistant)
- 1989: Maine
- 1990–1994: Ohio
- 2000: Bowling Green (OC)
- 2001–2003: McCord Middle School (volunteer HC)
- 2004: Columbus Destroyers (assistant)
- 2007–2009: Drake (assistant)

Head coaching record
- Overall: 26–59–3 (college)
- Tournaments: 0–1 (NCAA D-I-AA playoffs)

Accomplishments and honors

Championships
- 1 Yankee (1989)

Awards
- Yankee Coach of the Year (1989)

Thomas Lichtenberg (July 13, 1940 – May 26, 2013) was an American football player and coach. He served as the head football coach also at Morehead State University (1979–1980), the University of Maine (1989), and Ohio University (1990–1994), compiling a career college football coaching record of 26–59–3. He was also an assistant coach at Ohio State University and the University of Notre Dame.

He began his teaching and coaching career as the first-ever head football coach at William Mason High School in Mason, Ohio in 1962, building the program from scratch at age 22. In 1965 the Comets joined the new Fort Ancient Valley Conference (FAVC) and he led them to four league titles through the 1970 season. After 10 years at Mason, he moved on to be the head coach at Purcell High School (now Purcell Marian High School) in Cincinnati before joining the college ranks.

Tom was the son of Clem and Dorothy (Miller) Lichtenberg and grew up in the Cincinnati area in Lockland, Ohio where he went to Lockland High School. He was named all-city in football and basketball, was the district champion in the 440-yard run (quarter-mile), and pitched on the baseball team. The Lichtenbergs eventually moved to Mason. Tom's siblings were Kathy, Terry, Ted, and Tim. Tom coached his brothers Tim and Terry, who were both starting quarterbacks for Mason High School. Tim later also served a long tenure as head football coach at Mason.

Prior to accepting a teaching job at Mason, Tom was a three-year football letterwinner (playing fullback) and one-year track letterwinner at the University of Louisville. He earned a Bachelor of Science degree in health and physical education from Louisville in 1962 and a master of education and secondary administration from Xavier University in 1966. Tom and his wife of 52 years, Sue Ann, had five children and 12 grandchildren.

He died of cancer in 2013, aged 72, he lived in Spring Hill, Florida.

== Head coaching record ==
Year	Team	Overall	Conference	Standing	Bowl/playoffs	NCAA^{#}
Morehead State Eagles (Ohio Valley Conference) (1979–1980)
1979	Morehead State	5–4–1	3–2–1	3rd		
1980	Morehead State	4–7	2–5	T–6th		
Morehead State:		9–11–1	5–7–1			
Maine Black Bears (Yankee Conference) (1989)
1989	Maine	9–3	6–2	T–1st	L NCAA Division I-AA First Round	8
Maine:		9–3	6–2			
Ohio Bobcats (Mid-American Conference) (1990–1994)
1990	Ohio	1–9–1	0–7–1	9th		
1991	Ohio	2–8–1	1–6–1	8th		
1992	Ohio	1–10	1–7	T–9th		
1993	Ohio	4–7	4–5	6th		
1994	Ohio	0–11	0–9	10th		
Ohio:		8–45–2	6–34–2			
Total:		26–59–3				
National championship Conference title Conference division title or championship game berth
