= Phil Albert =

American football player and coach (1944–2020)

Biographical details
- Born: April 4, 1944; Johnstown, Pennsylvania, U.S.
- Died: December 8, 2020 (aged 76); Westminster, Maryland, U.S.

Playing career
- 1963–1964: Cisco College
- 1965–1966: Arizona
- Position(s): Quarterback

Coaching career (HC unless noted)
- 1969–1971: Towson State (assistant)
- 1972–1991: Towson State
- 2003–2008: Towson (assistant)

Head coaching record
- Overall: 117–91–3

Accomplishments and honors

Championships
- 1 Mason–Dixon (1974)

Phil Albert (April 4, 1944 – December 8, 2020) was an American football player and coach. He was the second head football coach at Towson University, serving from 1972 to 1991 and compiling a record of 117–91–3. Albert led the Tigers to the program's first conference championship in 1974 when they went 10–0 and won the Mason–Dixon Conference title.

Albert played college football at the University of Arizona. When he was named as the Tigers' coach at the age of 28, he was one of the youngest head football coaches in the nation, and Towson was starting just its fourth season of college football. Over the next 20 years, Albert directed the very young program to success at three different levels of NCAA competition. His teams advanced to the NCAA postseason four times.

He was named "Coach of the Year" five times. He coached 28 All-Americans and four National Football League (NFL) players, including Sean Landeta and Dave Meggett. In 1994, Phil was inducted into the Towson University Athletic Hall of Fame. From 1994 to 2001, he worked with the San Diego Chargers organization as the advanced game day scout.

== Head coaching record ==
Year	Team	Overall	Conference	Standing	Bowl/playoffs	NCAA Division II^{#}
Towson State Tigers (Mason–Dixon Conference) (1972–1974)
1972	Towson State	1–9	1–2	5th		
1973	Towson State	4–4	0–3	T–5th		
1974	Towson State	10–0	4–0	1st		
Towson State Tigers (NCAA Division III independent) (1975–1978)
1975	Towson State	6–4				
1976	Towson State	10–3			L NCAA Division III Championship	
1977	Towson State	5–4–1				
1978	Towson State	7–3				
Towson State Tigers (NCAA Division II independent) (1979–1986)
1979	Towson State	9–1				
1980	Towson State	5–5				
1981	Towson State	5–5				
1982	Towson State	7–4				
1983	Towson State	10–2			L NCAA Division II Quarterfinal	4
1984	Towson State	9–4			L NCAA Division II Semifinal	8
1985	Towson State	7–2–1				10
1986	Towson State	8–3–1			L NCAA Division II Quarterfinal	7
Towson State Tigers (NCAA Division I-AA independent) (1987–1991)
1987	Towson State	4–6				
1988	Towson State	5–5				
1989	Towson State	2–8				
1990	Towson State	2–9				
1991	Towson State	1–10				
Towson State:		117–91–3				
Total:		117–91–3				
National championship Conference title Conference division title or championship game berth
