= 1989 Bethune–Cookman Wildcats football team =

American college football season

1989 Bethune–Cookman Wildcats football
- Conference: Mid-Eastern Athletic Conference
- Record: 5–5 (3–3 MEAC)
- Head coach: Larry Little (7th season)
- Home stadium: Municipal Stadium

1989 Mid-Eastern Athletic Conference football standings
	Conf.					Overall
Team	W		L		T	W		L		T
Delaware State $	5	–	1	–	0	7	–	4	–	0
Howard	4	–	2	–	0	8	–	3	–	0
Florida A&M	3	–	3	–	0	6	–	5	–	0
Bethune–Cookman	3	–	3	–	0	5	–	5	–	0
South Carolina State	3	–	3	–	0	5	–	6	–	0
North Carolina A&T	2	–	4	–	0	5	–	6	–	0
Morgan State	1	–	5	–	0	3	–	7	–	1
$ – Conference champion

The 1989 Bethune–Cookman Wildcats football team represented Bethune–Cookman College (now known as Bethune–Cookman University) as a member of the Mid-Eastern Athletic Conference (MEAC) during the 1989 NCAA Division I-AA football season. Led by seventh-year head coach Larry Little, the Wildcats compiled an overall record of 5–5, with a mark of 3–3 in conference play, and finished tied for third in the MEAC.

== Schedule ==
Date	Opponent	Site	Result	Attendance	Source
September 1	at UCF*	Florida Citrus Bowl; Orlando, FL	W 23–15	23,620	
September 9	vs. Morgan State	Gator Bowl; Jacksonville, FL	W 6–12 (forfeit win)	7,500	
September 16	Howard	Municipal Stadium; Daytona Beach, FL	W 10–3	5,400	
September 30	vs. No. 15 Jackson State*	Hoosier Dome; Indianapolis, IN (Circle City Classic)	L 7–27	53,822	
October 7	at Delaware State	Alumni Stadium; Dover, DE	L 14–28		
October 14	vs. South Carolina State	Lockhart Stadium; Fort Lauderdale, FL (South Florida Football Classic)	W 33–30	8,599	
October 21	at Albany State*	Mills Stadium; Albany, GA	L 0–34		
October 28	North Carolina A&T	Municipal Stadium; Daytona Beach, FL	L 10–14	9,000	
November 11	District of Columbia*	Municipal Stadium; Daytona Beach, FL	W 68–6	3,000	
November 25	vs. Florida A&M	Tampa Stadium; Tampa, FL (Florida Classic)	L 7–30	43,703	
*Non-conference game; Rankings from NCAA Division I-AA Football Committee Poll released prior to the game
