= 1989 Colgate Red Raiders football team =

American college football season

1989 Colgate Red Raiders football
- Conference: Colonial League
- Record: 4–7 (1–3 Colonial)
- Head coach: Michael Foley (2nd season)
- Captains: Steve Aldiero; Paul Bushey
- Home stadium: Andy Kerr Stadium

1989 Colonial League football standings
	Conf.					Overall
Team	W		L		T	W		L		T
No. T–4 Holy Cross $	4	–	0	–	0	10	–	1	–	0
Bucknell	2	–	2	–	0	5	–	5	–	0
Lafayette	2	–	2	–	0	5	–	5	–	0
Lehigh	1	–	3	–	0	5	–	6	–	0
Colgate	1	–	3	–	0	4	–	7	–	0
$ – Conference champion; Rankings from NCAA Division I-AA Football Committee poll

The 1989 Colgate Red Raiders football team was an American football team that represented Colgate University during the 1989 NCAA Division I-AA football season. Colgate tied for last in the Colonial League.

In its second season under head coach Michael Foley, the team compiled a 4–7 record. Paul Bushey and Steve Aldiero were the team captains.

The Red Raiders were outscored 289 to 262. Colgate's 1–3 conference record tied for fourth place in the five-team Colonial League standings.

The team played its home games at Andy Kerr Stadium in Hamilton, New York.

== Schedule ==
Date	Opponent	Site	Result	Attendance	Source
September 2	Fordham*	Andy Kerr Stadium; Hamilton, NY	W 35–3	3,600	
September 9	at No. 20 William & Mary*	Cary Field; Williamsburg, VA	L 13–17	10,384	
September 16	Penn*	Andy Kerr Stadium; Hamilton, NY	W 21–14	3,000	
September 23	at Brown*	Andy Kerr Stadium; Hamilton, NY	W 42–7	1,800	
October 7	at Yale*	Yale Bowl; New Haven, CT	L 15–36	20,540	
October 14	at New Hampshire*	Cowell Stadium; Durham, NH	L 10–17	8,215	
October 21	at No. 9 Holy Cross	Fitton Field; Worcester, MA	L 6–31	17,803	
October 28	at Lafayette	Fisher Field; Easton, PA	L 33–38	9,815	
November 4	Lehigh	Andy Kerr Stadium; Hamilton, NY	W 46–30	5,500	
November 11	Bucknell	Andy Kerr Stadium; Hamilton, NY	L 27–37	3,000	
November 18	at Army*	Michie Stadium; West Point, NY	L 14–59	39,404	
*Non-conference game; Rankings from NCAA Division I-AA Football Committee Poll released prior to the game
