= 1989 Arkansas State Indians football team =

American college football season

1989 Arkansas State Indians football
- Conference: Independent
- Record: 5–6
- Head coach: Larry Lacewell (11th season)
- Home stadium: Indian Stadium

1989 NCAA Division I-AA independents football standings
	Conf.			Overall
Team	W	L	T	W		L		T
No. 1 Georgia Southern ^		–		15	–	0	–	0
No. 14 Youngstown State ^		–		9	–	4	–	0
No. T–10 William & Mary ^		–		8	–	3	–	1
Liberty		–		7	–	3	–	0
Western Kentucky		–		6	–	5	–	0
James Madison		–		5	–	4	–	1
Lamar		–		5	–	5	–	0
Arkansas State		–		5	–	6	–	0
Nicholls State		–		5	–	6	–	0
Samford		–		5	–	6	–	0
Northeastern		–		3	–	7	–	0
Fordham		–		2	–	6	–	0
Towson State		–		2	–	8	–	0
^ – NCAA Division I-AA playoff participant; Rankings from NCAA Division I-AA Football Committee poll

The 1989 Arkansas State Indians football team represented Arkansas State University as an independent during the 1989 NCAA Division I-AA football season. Led by 11th-year head coach Larry Lacewell, the Indians finished the season with a record of 5–6.

== Schedule ==
Date	Opponent	Rank	Site	Result	Attendance	Source
September 9	at Memphis State		Liberty Bowl Memorial Stadium; Memphis, TN (rivalry)	W 17–13	30,794	
September 16	at Ole Miss		Vaught–Hemingway Stadium; Oxford, MS	L 31–34	29,000	
September 23	No. 2 North Texas	No. 8	Indian Stadium; Jonesboro, AR	L 17–20		
September 30	Southern Illinois	No. 12	Indian Stadium; Jonesboro, AR	W 28–23	12,726	
October 7	at Lamar	No. 10	Cardinal Stadium; Beaumont, TX	W 41–31		
October 14	McNeese State	No. 9	Indian Stadium; Jonesboro, AR	W 21–16		
October 21	Louisiana Tech	No. 6	Indian Stadium; Jonesboro, AR	L 37–40	15,891	
October 28	at Northeast Louisiana	No. T–18	Malone Stadium; Monroe, LA	L 7–13	19,466	
November 4	No. 4 (D-II) Pittsburg State^{†}		Indian Stadium; Jonesboro, AR	L 13–34	15,627	
November 11	at Illinois State		Hancock Stadium; Normal, IL	W 21–12	10,851	
November 18	at Southwestern Louisiana		Cajun Field; Lafayette, LA	L 28–29	12,231	
^{†}Homecoming; Rankings from NCAA Division I-AA Football Committee Poll released prior to the game
