= 1989 Liberty Flames football team =

American college football season

1989 Liberty Flames football
- Conference: Independent
- Record: 7–3
- Head coach: Sam Rutigliano (1st season)
- Home stadium: City Stadium; Willard May Stadium

1989 NCAA Division I-AA independents football standings
| | Conf. | | | Overall |
| Team | W | L | T | W | | L | | T |
|---|---|---|---|---|---|---|---|---|
| No. 1 Georgia Southern ^ | | – | | 15 | – | 0 | – | 0 |
| No. 14 Youngstown State ^ | | – | | 9 | – | 4 | – | 0 |
| No. T–10 William & Mary ^ | | – | | 8 | – | 3 | – | 1 |
| Liberty | | – | | 7 | – | 3 | – | 0 |
| Western Kentucky | | – | | 6 | – | 5 | – | 0 |
| James Madison | | – | | 5 | – | 4 | – | 1 |
| Lamar | | – | | 5 | – | 5 | – | 0 |
| Arkansas State | | – | | 5 | – | 6 | – | 0 |
| Nicholls State | | – | | 5 | – | 6 | – | 0 |
| Samford | | – | | 5 | – | 6 | – | 0 |
| Northeastern | | – | | 3 | – | 7 | – | 0 |
| Fordham | | – | | 2 | – | 6 | – | 0 |
| Towson State | | – | | 2 | – | 8 | – | 0 |
^ – NCAA Division I-AA playoff participant; Rankings from NCAA Division I-AA Football Committee poll

The 1989 Liberty Flames football team represented Liberty University as an independent during the 1989 NCAA Division I-AA football season. Led by first-year head coach Sam Rutigliano, the Flames compiled an overall record of 7–3.

== Schedule ==
| Date | Opponent | Rank | Site | Result | Attendance | Source |
|---|---|---|---|---|---|---|
| September 9 | Edinboro | | City Stadium; Lynchburg, VA | W 51–27 | 5,107 | |
| September 23 | at Morehead State | | Jayne Stadium; Morehead, KY | W 34–14 | 5,200 | |
| September 30 | James Madison | | City Stadium; Lynchburg, VA | W 19–14 | 7,600 | |
| October 7 | No. 19 Eastern Illinois | | City Stadium; Lynchburg, VA | W 9–7 | | |
| October 14 | at Eastern Michigan | No. 17 | Rynearson Stadium; Ypsilanti, MI | W 25–24 | | |
| October 21 | Towson State | No. 11 | Willard May Stadium; Lynchburg, VA | W 37–18 | 12,750 | |
| October 28 | at UCF | No. T–9 | Florida Citrus Bowl; Orlando, FL | L 30–33 | 15,095 | |
| November 4 | at Youngstown State | No. T–13 | Stambaugh Stadium; Youngstown, OH | L 14–41 | | |
| November 11 | Kutztown | | Willard May Stadium; Lynchburg, VA | W 48–14 | 8,595 | |
| November 18 | No. 9 Southwest Missouri State | | Willard May Stadium; Lynchburg, VA | L 20–31 | | |
Rankings from NCAA Division I-AA Football Committee Poll released prior to the game
