= 1989 Connecticut Huskies football team =

American college football season

1989 Connecticut Huskies football

Yankee Conference co-champion
- Conference: Yankee Conference
- Record: 8–3 (6–2 Yankee)
- Head coach: Tom Jackson (7th season)
- Home stadium: Memorial Stadium

1989 Yankee Conference football standings
	Conf.					Overall
Team	W		L		T	W		L		T
No. 8 Maine +^	6	–	2	–	0	9	–	3	–	0
No. 18 Connecticut +	6	–	2	–	0	8	–	3	–	0
No. 16 Villanova +^	6	–	2	–	0	8	–	4	–	0
New Hampshire	5	–	3	–	0	7	–	3	–	0
Delaware	5	–	3	–	0	7	–	4	–	0
Boston University	4	–	4	–	0	4	–	7	–	0
UMass	3	–	5	–	0	5	–	5	–	1
Rhode Island	1	–	7	–	0	3	–	8	–	0
Richmond	0	–	8	–	0	1	–	10	–	0
+ – Conference co-champions; ^ – NCAA Division I-AA playoff participant; Rankings from NCAA Division I-AA Football Committee poll

The 1989 Connecticut Huskies football team represented the University of Connecticut in the 1989 NCAA Division I-AA football season. The Huskies were led by seventh-year head coach Tom Jackson, and completed the season with a record of 8–3.

== Schedule ==
Date	Opponent	Rank	Site	Result	Attendance	Source
September 9	Central Connecticut*		Memorial Stadium; Storrs, CT	W 27–9		
September 17	at SMU*		Ownby Stadium; University Park, TX	L 30–31	20,548	
September 23	New Hampshire		Memorial Stadium; Storrs, CT	W 20–10		
September 30	at Yale*	No. 18	Yale Bowl; New Haven, CT	W 31–20	21,319	
October 7	at Villanova		Villanova Stadium; Villanova, PA	L 35–41 ^{6OT}	7,877	
October 14	UMass		Memorial Stadium; Storrs, CT (rivalry)	W 39–33 ^{OT}	12,440	
October 21	at No. 4 Maine		Alumni Field; Orono, ME	L 8–30	10,346	
October 28	at Richmond		UR Stadium; Richmond, VA	W 13–3	12,354	
November 4	Delaware		Memorial Stadium; Storrs, CT	W 21–17	9,467	
November 11	Boston University		Memorial Stadium; Storrs, CT	W 38–30		
November 18	at Rhode Island		Meade Stadium; Kingston, RI (rivalry)	W 35–28	5,045	
*Non-conference game; Rankings from NCAA Division I-AA Football Committee Poll released prior to the game
