= 1989 Maine Black Bears football team =

American college football season

1989 Maine Black Bears football

Yankee Conference co-champion

NCAA Division I-AA First Round, L 35–38 at Southwest Missouri State
- Conference: Yankee Conference
- Record: 9–3 (6–2 Yankee)
- Head coach: Tom Lichtenberg (1st season)
- Offensive coordinator: Jack Cosgrove (1st season)
- Defensive coordinator: Mike Kolakowski (1st season)
- Captains: Scott Hough; John Gibson
- Home stadium: Alumni Field

1989 Yankee Conference football standings
	Conf.					Overall
Team	W		L		T	W		L		T
No. 8 Maine +^	6	–	2	–	0	9	–	3	–	0
No. 18 Connecticut +	6	–	2	–	0	8	–	3	–	0
No. 16 Villanova +^	6	–	2	–	0	8	–	4	–	0
New Hampshire	5	–	3	–	0	7	–	3	–	0
Delaware	5	–	3	–	0	7	–	4	–	0
Boston University	4	–	4	–	0	4	–	7	–	0
UMass	3	–	5	–	0	5	–	5	–	1
Rhode Island	1	–	7	–	0	3	–	8	–	0
Richmond	0	–	8	–	0	1	–	10	–	0
+ – Conference co-champions; ^ – NCAA Division I-AA playoff participant; Rankings from NCAA Division I-AA Football Committee poll

The 1989 Maine Black Bears football team was an American football team that represented the University of Maine as a member of the Yankee Conference during the 1989 NCAA Division I-AA football season. In their first and only season under head coach Tom Lichtenberg, the Black Bears compiled a 9–3 record (6–2 against conference opponents), tied for the Yankee Conference championship, and lost to 1989 Southwest Missouri State Bears football team in the first round of the NCAA Division I-AA Football Championship playoffs. Scott Hough and John Gibson were the team captains.

== Schedule ==
Date	Opponent	Rank	Site	Result	Attendance	Source
September 2	Youngstown State*		Alumni Field; Orono, ME	W 28–14	8,050	
September 9	at New Hampshire		Cowell Stadium; Durham, NH	W 24–7		
September 16	Villanova		Alumni Field; Orono, ME	W 47–14	8,650	
September 23	UMass	No. 9	Alumni Field; Orono, ME	W 40–23	10,389	
September 30	Richmond	No. 8	Alumni Field; Orono, ME	W 41–16	7,169	
October 7	Lock Haven*	No. 8	Alumni Field; Orono, ME	W 56–0	11,176	
October 14	at Rhode Island	No. 6	Meade Stadium; Kingston, RI	W 47–21	8,847	
October 21	Connecticut	No. 4	Alumni Field; Orono, ME	W 30–8	10,346	
October 28	at Delaware	No. 4	Delaware Stadium; Newark, DE	L 28–35	22,805	
November 4	at Boston University	No. 8	Nickerson Field; Boston, MA	L 28–30		
November 11	at Northeastern*	No. 10	Parsons Field; Brookline, MA	W 29–26		
November 25	at No. 9 Southwest Missouri State*	No. 8	Briggs Stadium; Springfield, MO (NCAA Division I-AA First Round)	L 35–38	7,270	
*Non-conference game; Rankings from NCAA Division I-AA Football Committee Poll released prior to the game

== Roster ==
1989 Maine Black Bears football team roster
Players			Coaches
Offense: Pos. / # / Name / Class; QB / 16 / Mike Buck / Sr	Defense: Pos. / # / Name / Class; DT / 96 / Justin Strzelczyk / Jr	Special teams: Pos. / # / Name / Class; P / 4 / Steve Bell / Sr	Head coach: Tom Lichtenberg; Coordinators/assistant coaches Legend: (C) Team captain; (S) Suspended; (I) Ineligible; Injured; Redshirt

== After the season ==
The following Black Bears were selected in the 1990 NFL draft after the season.

Round	Pick	Player	Position	NFL club
6	156	Mike Buck	Quarterback	New Orleans Saints
7	183	Scott Hough	Guard	New Orleans Saints
11	293	Justin Strzelczyk	Tackle	Pittsburgh Steelers
