= 1989 William & Mary Tribe football team =

American college football season

1989 William & Mary Tribe football

NCAA Division I-AA First Round, L 10–24 at Furman
- Conference: Independent
- Record: 8–3–1
- Head coach: Jimmye Laycock (10th season)
- Captains: Craig Argo; Greg Kimball
- Home stadium: Cary Field

1989 NCAA Division I-AA independents football standings
| | Conf. | | | Overall |
| Team | W | L | T | W | | L | | T |
|---|---|---|---|---|---|---|---|---|
| No. 1 Georgia Southern ^ | | – | | 15 | – | 0 | – | 0 |
| No. 14 Youngstown State ^ | | – | | 9 | – | 4 | – | 0 |
| No. T–10 William & Mary ^ | | – | | 8 | – | 3 | – | 1 |
| Liberty | | – | | 7 | – | 3 | – | 0 |
| Western Kentucky | | – | | 6 | – | 5 | – | 0 |
| James Madison | | – | | 5 | – | 4 | – | 1 |
| Lamar | | – | | 5 | – | 5 | – | 0 |
| Arkansas State | | – | | 5 | – | 6 | – | 0 |
| Nicholls State | | – | | 5 | – | 6 | – | 0 |
| Samford | | – | | 5 | – | 6 | – | 0 |
| Northeastern | | – | | 3 | – | 7 | – | 0 |
| Fordham | | – | | 2 | – | 6 | – | 0 |
| Towson State | | – | | 2 | – | 8 | – | 0 |
^ – NCAA Division I-AA playoff participant; Rankings from NCAA Division I-AA Football Committee poll

The 1989 William & Mary Tribe football team represented the College of William & Mary as an independent during the 1989 NCAA Division I-AA football season. Led by Jimmye Laycock in his tenth year as head coach, William & Mary finished the season with a record of 8–3–1 and ranked No. 10 in the final NCAA Division I-AA Football Committee poll. The Tribe qualified for the NCAA Division I-AA playoffs, losing to Furman in the first round.

== Schedule ==
| Date | Opponent | Rank | Site | Result | Attendance | Source |
|---|---|---|---|---|---|---|
| September 9 | Colgate | No. 20 | Cary Field; Williamsburg, VA | W 17–13 | 10,384 | |
| September 16 | at VMI | No. 20 | Alumni Memorial Field; Lexington, VA (rivalry) | W 24–17 | 4,826 | |
| September 23 | at Princeton | No. T–15 | Palmer Stadium; Princeton, NJ | T 31–31 | 4,138 | |
| September 30 | at Virginia | No. 19 | Scott Stadium; Charlottesville, VA | L 12–24 | 35,000 | |
| October 7 | No. 14 Delaware | | Cary Field; Williamsburg, VA (rivalry) | W 27–24 | 14,397 | |
| October 14 | vs. Boston University | No. T–13 | Foreman Field; Norfolk, VA (Oyster Bowl) | W 13–10 | | |
| October 21 | at Villanova | No. 12 | Villanova Stadium; Villanova, PA | L 17–20 | 9,857 | |
| October 28 | at Lehigh | | Goodman Stadium; Bethlehem, PA | W 55–39 | 10,824 | |
| November 4 | East Tennessee State | No. 17 | Cary Field; Williamsburg, VA | W 34–28 | | |
| November 11 | James Madison | No. 12 | Cary Field; Williamsburg, VA (rivalry) | W 24–21 | 12,420 | |
| November 18 | Richmond | No. 11 | Cary Field; Williamsburg, VA (I-64 Bowl) | W 22–10 | 13,110 | |
| November 25 | at No. 2 Furman | No. T–10 | Paladin Stadium; Greenville, SC (NCAA Division I-AA First Round) | L 10–24 | 8,642 | |
Rankings from NCAA Division I-AA Football Committee Poll released prior to the game
