= 1989 Holy Cross Crusaders football team =

American college football season

1989 Holy Cross Crusaders football

Colonial League champion Lambert Cup winner
- Conference: Colonial League
- Record: 10–1 (4–0 Colonial)
- Head coach: Mark Duffner (4th season)
- Defensive coordinator: Kevin Coyle (4th season)
- Captains: Tim Donovan; Chris Maruca; Dave Murphy; Randy Pedro
- Home stadium: Fitton Field

1989 Colonial League football standings
	Conf.					Overall
Team	W		L		T	W		L		T
No. T–4 Holy Cross $	4	–	0	–	0	10	–	1	–	0
Bucknell	2	–	2	–	0	5	–	5	–	0
Lafayette	2	–	2	–	0	5	–	5	–	0
Lehigh	1	–	3	–	0	5	–	6	–	0
Colgate	1	–	3	–	0	4	–	7	–	0
$ – Conference champion; Rankings from NCAA Division I-AA Football Committee poll

The 1989 Holy Cross Crusaders football team was an American football team that represented the College of the Holy Cross during the 1989 NCAA Division I-AA football season. Holy Cross swept its conference and won its third Colonial League championship in four years.

In their fourth year under head coach Mark Duffner, the Crusaders compiled a 10–1 record. Tim Donovan, Randy Pedro, Chris Maruca and Dave Murphy were the team captains.

The Crusaders outscored opponents 396 to 161. Holy Cross' undefeated (4–0) conference record placed first in the five-team Colonial League standings.

The Crusaders started the year at No. 8 in the national Division I-AA rankings and reached as high as No. 3. They were ranked No. 4 at season's end but did not participate in the national championship playoffs, as Colonial League rules at the time prohibited postseason play.

Holy Cross played its home games at Fitton Field on the college campus in Worcester, Massachusetts.

== Schedule ==
Date	Opponent	Rank	Site	Result	Attendance	Source
September 9	Villanova*	No. 8	Fitton Field; Worcester, MA	W 38–17	12,881	
September 16	at Lafayette	No. 8	Fisher Field; Easton, PA	W 23–21	10,700	
September 23	at Harvard*	No. 4	Harvard Stadium; Boston, MA	W 31–17	17,500	
September 30	Princeton^{†}*	No. 4	Fitton Field; Worcester, MA	W 46–0	16,442	
October 7	at Dartmouth*	No. 3	Memorial Field; Hanover, NH	W 33–7	7,107	
October 14	at Army*	No. 3	Michie Stadium; West Point, NY	L 9–45	40,869	
October 21	Colgate^	No. 9	Fitton Field; Worcester, MA	W 31–6	17,803	
October 28	Brown*	No. 8	Fitton Field; Worcester, MA	W 49–13	8,614	
November 4	Northeastern*	No. 6	Fitton Field; Worcester, MA	W 46–13	8,335	
November 11	at Lehigh	No. 6	Goodman Stadium; Bethlehem, PA	W 55–16	7,727	
November 18	at Bucknell	No. 4	Christy Mathewson–Memorial Stadium; Lewisburg, PA	W 35–6	4,662	
*Non-conference game; ^{†}Homecoming; ^ Family Weekend; Rankings from the latest NCAA Division I-AA poll released prior to the game
