= 1989 Howard Bison football team =

American college football season

1989 Howard Bison football
- Conference: Mid-Eastern Athletic Conference
- Record: 8–3 (4–2 MEAC)
- Head coach: Steve Wilson (1st season)
- Home stadium: William H. Greene Stadium

1989 Mid-Eastern Athletic Conference football standings
	Conf.					Overall
Team	W		L		T	W		L		T
Delaware State $	5	–	1	–	0	7	–	4	–	0
Howard	4	–	2	–	0	8	–	3	–	0
Florida A&M	3	–	3	–	0	6	–	5	–	0
Bethune–Cookman	3	–	3	–	0	5	–	5	–	0
South Carolina State	3	–	3	–	0	5	–	6	–	0
North Carolina A&T	2	–	4	–	0	5	–	6	–	0
Morgan State	1	–	5	–	0	3	–	7	–	1
$ – Conference champion

The 1989 Howard Bison football team represented Howard University as a member of the Mid-Eastern Athletic Conference (MEAC) during the 1989 NCAA Division I-AA football season. Led by first-year head coach Steve Wilson, the Bison compiled an overall record of 8–3, with a conference record of 4–2, and finished second in the MEAC.

== Schedule ==
Date	Opponent	Site	Result	Attendance	Source
September 2	District of Columbia*	William H. Greene Stadium; Washington, DC	W 40–0		
September 9	vs. Grambling State*	Giants Stadium; East Rutherford, NJ (Whitney Young Memorial Classic)	W 6–0	28,653	
September 16	at Bethune–Cookman	Municipal Stadium; Daytona Beach, FL	L 3–10	5,400	
September 23	South Carolina State	William H. Greene Stadium; Washington, DC	W 10–3		
October 7	at No. 20 IUP*	Miller Stadium; Indiana, PA	L 14–34		
October 14	Virginia State*	William H. Greene Stadium; Washington, DC	W 17–14	7,246	
October 21	at North Carolina A&T	Aggie Stadium; Greensboro, NC	L 9–13		
October 28	Morehouse*	William H. Greene Stadium; Washington, DC	W 37–10		
November 4	at Morgan State	Hughes Stadium; Baltimore, MD (rivalry)	W 31–0	8,645	
November 11	Florida A&M	William H. Greene Stadium; Washington, DC	W 19–14	21,505	
November 18	at Delaware State	Alumni Stadium; Dover, DE	W 19–14		
*Non-conference game; Rankings from NCAA Division II Football Committee Poll released prior to the game
