= 1989 Delaware Fightin' Blue Hens football team =

American college football season

1989 Delaware Fightin' Blue Hens football
- Conference: Yankee Conference
- Record: 7–4 (5–3 Yankee)
- Head coach: Tubby Raymond (24th season)
- Offensive coordinator: Ted Kempski (22nd season)
- Offensive scheme: Delaware Wing-T
- Base defense: 5–2
- Home stadium: Delaware Stadium

1989 Yankee Conference football standings
	Conf.					Overall
Team	W		L		T	W		L		T
No. 8 Maine +^	6	–	2	–	0	9	–	3	–	0
No. 18 Connecticut +	6	–	2	–	0	8	–	3	–	0
No. 16 Villanova +^	6	–	2	–	0	8	–	4	–	0
New Hampshire	5	–	3	–	0	7	–	3	–	0
Delaware	5	–	3	–	0	7	–	4	–	0
Boston University	4	–	4	–	0	4	–	7	–	0
UMass	3	–	5	–	0	5	–	5	–	1
Rhode Island	1	–	7	–	0	3	–	8	–	0
Richmond	0	–	8	–	0	1	–	10	–	0
+ – Conference co-champions; ^ – NCAA Division I-AA playoff participant; Rankings from NCAA Division I-AA Football Committee poll

The 1989 Delaware Fightin' Blue Hens football team represented the University of Delaware as a member of the Yankee Conference during the 1989 NCAA Division I-AA football season. Led by 24th-year head coach Tubby Raymond, the Fightin' Blue Hens compiled an overall record of 7–5 with a mark of 5–3 in conference play, tying for fourth place in the Yankee Conference. The team played home games at Delaware Stadium in Newark, Delaware.

== Schedule ==
Date	Opponent	Rank	Site	Result	Attendance	Source
September 9	at Boston University	No. 5	Nickerson Field; Boston, MA	W 28–21		
September 16	at Rhode Island	No. 5	Meade Stadium; Kingston, RI	W 21–12	6,218	
September 23	No. 12 (D-II) West Chester*	No. 10	Delaware Stadium; Newark, DE (rivalry)	W 41–21	19,293	
September 30	New Hampshire	No. 9	Delaware Stadium; Newark, DE	L 17–27		
October 7	at William & Mary*	No. 14	Cary Field; Williamsburg, VA (rivalry)	L 24–27	14,397	
October 14	Villanova		Delaware Stadium; Newark, DE (Battle of the Blue)	L 11–20	17,841	
October 21	at UMass		Warren McGuirk Alumni Stadium; Hadley, MA	W 21–14	4,780	
October 28	No. 4 Maine^{†}		Delaware Stadium; Newark, DE	W 35–28	22,805	
November 4	at Connecticut		Memorial Stadium; Storrs, CT	L 17–21	9,467	
November 11	Richmond		Delaware Stadium; Newark, DE	W 33–17	20,666	
November 18	Navy*		Delaware Stadium; Newark, DE	W 10–9	20,492	
*Non-conference game; ^{†}Homecoming; Rankings from NCAA Division I-AA Football Committee Poll released prior to the game
