= 1989 New Hampshire Wildcats football team =

American college football season

1989 New Hampshire Wildcats football
- Conference: Yankee Conference
- Record: 7–3 (5–3 Yankee)
- Head coach: Bill Bowes (18th season)
- Offensive coordinator: Gary Crowton (2nd season)
- Home stadium: Cowell Stadium

1989 Yankee Conference football standings
	Conf.					Overall
Team	W		L		T	W		L		T
No. 8 Maine +^	6	–	2	–	0	9	–	3	–	0
No. 18 Connecticut +	6	–	2	–	0	8	–	3	–	0
No. 16 Villanova +^	6	–	2	–	0	8	–	4	–	0
New Hampshire	5	–	3	–	0	7	–	3	–	0
Delaware	5	–	3	–	0	7	–	4	–	0
Boston University	4	–	4	–	0	4	–	7	–	0
UMass	3	–	5	–	0	5	–	5	–	1
Rhode Island	1	–	7	–	0	3	–	8	–	0
Richmond	0	–	8	–	0	1	–	10	–	0
+ – Conference co-champions; ^ – NCAA Division I-AA playoff participant; Rankings from NCAA Division I-AA Football Committee poll

The 1989 New Hampshire Wildcats football team was an American football team that represented the University of New Hampshire as a member of the Yankee Conference during the 1989 NCAA Division I-AA football season. In its 18th year under head coach Bill Bowes, the team compiled a 7–3 record (5–3 against conference opponents) and tied for fourth place out of eight teams in the Yankee Conference.

== Schedule ==
Date	Opponent	Rank	Site	Result	Attendance	Source
September 9	Maine		Cowell Stadium; Durham, NH (rivalry)	L 7–24		
September 23	at Connecticut		Memorial Stadium; Storrs, CT	L 10–24		
September 30	at No. 9 Delaware		Delaware Stadium; Newark, DE	W 27–17		
October 7	at Northeastern*		Parsons Field; Brookline, MA	W 31–28		
October 14	Colgate*		Cowell Stadium; Durham, NH	W 17–10	8,215	
October 21	Richmond		Cowell Stadium; Durham, NH	W 21–7	6,325	
October 28	Boston University		Cowell Stadium; Durham, NH	W 38–35	4,490	
November 4	at No. T–11 Villanova		Villanova Stadium; Villanova, PA	W 13–12	7,616	
November 11	Rhode Island	No. 18	Cowell Stadium; Durham, NH	W 25–0	4,184	
November 18	at UMass		McGuirk Stadium; Hadley, MA (rivalry)	L 28–34	4,114	
*Non-conference game; Rankings from NCAA Division I-AA Football Committee Poll released prior to the game
