= 1989 Florida A&M Rattlers football team =

American college football season

1989 Florida A&M Rattlers football
- Conference: Mid-Eastern Athletic Conference
- Record: 6–5 (3–3 MEAC)
- Head coach: Ken Riley (4th season)
- Offensive coordinator: Kent Schoolfield (1st season)
- Home stadium: Bragg Memorial Stadium

1989 Mid-Eastern Athletic Conference football standings
	Conf.					Overall
Team	W		L		T	W		L		T
Delaware State $	5	–	1	–	0	7	–	4	–	0
Howard	4	–	2	–	0	8	–	3	–	0
Florida A&M	3	–	3	–	0	6	–	5	–	0
Bethune–Cookman	3	–	3	–	0	5	–	5	–	0
South Carolina State	3	–	3	–	0	5	–	6	–	0
North Carolina A&T	2	–	4	–	0	5	–	6	–	0
Morgan State	1	–	5	–	0	3	–	7	–	1
$ – Conference champion

The 1989 Florida A&M Rattlers football team represented Florida A&M University as a member of the Mid-Eastern Athletic Conference (MEAC) during the 1989 NCAA Division I-AA football season. Led by fourth-year head coach Ken Riley, the Rattlers compiled an overall record of 6–5, with a mark of 3–3 in conference play, and finished tied for third in the MEAC.

== Schedule ==
Date	Opponent	Site	Result	Attendance	Source
September 2	Tuskegee*	Bragg Memorial Stadium; Tallahassee, FL	W 41–9		
September 16	vs. No. 2 Georgia Southern*	Gator Bowl; Jacksonville, FL (Bold City Classic)	L 0–28	13,481	
September 23	vs. Tennessee State*	Bobby Dodd Stadium; Atlanta, GA (Ebony Classic)	W 21–9	47,373	
September 30	Alabama State*	Bragg Memorial Stadium; Tallahassee, FL	L 8–23	11,242	
October 7	at North Carolina A&T	Aggie Stadium; Greensboro, NC	W 24–20	19,715	
October 14	Delaware State	Bragg Memorial Stadium; Tallahassee, FL	L 13–18	31,003	
October 21	at South Carolina State	Oliver C. Dawson Stadium; Orangeburg, SC	L 26–28	15,584	
October 28	vs. Morgan State	Miami Orange Bowl; Miami, FL (Orange Blossom Classic)	W 31–13	12,492	
November 4	Southern*	Bragg Memorial Stadium; Tallahassee, FL	W 21–13		
November 11	at Howard	William H. Greene Stadium; Washington, DC	L 14–19	21,505	
November 25	vs. Bethune–Cookman	Tampa Stadium; Tampa, FL (Florida Classic)	W 30–7	43,703	
*Non-conference game; Rankings from NCAA Division I-AA Football Committee Poll released prior to the game
