= 1989 James Madison Dukes football team =

American college football season

1989 James Madison Dukes football
- Conference: Independent
- Record: 5–4–1
- Head coach: Joe Purzycki (5th season)
- Home stadium: JMU Stadium

1989 NCAA Division I-AA independents football standings
	Conf.			Overall
Team	W	L	T	W		L		T
No. 1 Georgia Southern ^		–		15	–	0	–	0
No. 14 Youngstown State ^		–		9	–	4	–	0
No. T–10 William & Mary ^		–		8	–	3	–	1
Liberty		–		7	–	3	–	0
Western Kentucky		–		6	–	5	–	0
James Madison		–		5	–	4	–	1
Lamar		–		5	–	5	–	0
Arkansas State		–		5	–	6	–	0
Nicholls State		–		5	–	6	–	0
Samford		–		5	–	6	–	0
Northeastern		–		3	–	7	–	0
Fordham		–		2	–	6	–	0
Towson State		–		2	–	8	–	0
^ – NCAA Division I-AA playoff participant; Rankings from NCAA Division I-AA Football Committee poll

The 1989 James Madison Dukes football team was an American football team that represented James Madison University during the 1989 NCAA Division I-AA football season as an independent. In their fifth year under head coach Joe Purzycki, the team compiled a 5–4–1 record.

== Schedule ==
Date	Opponent	Site	Result	Attendance	Source
September 2	Bloomsburg	JMU Stadium; Harrisonburg, VA	W 48–3		
September 9	at UMass	McGuirk Stadium; Hadley, MA	T 28–28	9,428	
September 16	Richmond	JMU Stadium; Harrisonburg, VA (rivalry)	W 31–0		
September 23	at Appalachian State	Kidd Brewer Stadium; Boone, NC	L 14–23	10,060	
September 30	at Liberty	City Stadium; Lynchburg, VA	L 14–19	7,600	
October 14	Towson State	JMU Stadium; Harrisonburg, VA	W 41–6	12,800	
October 21	VMI	JMU Stadium; Harrisonburg, VA	W 25–0	9,115	
October 28	at Navy	Navy–Marine Corps Memorial Stadium; Annapolis, MD	W 24–20	30,024	
November 4	No. 2 Georgia Southern	JMU Stadium; Harrisonburg, VA	L 21–36	11,685	
November 11	at No. 12 William & Mary	Cary Field; Williamsburg, VA (rivalry)	L 21–24	12,420	
Rankings from NCAA Division I-AA Football Committee Poll released prior to the game
