= 1989 Lamar Cardinals football team =

American college football season

1989 Lamar Cardinals football
- Conference: Independent
- Record: 5–5
- Head coach: Ray Alborn (4th season)
- Home stadium: Cardinal Stadium

1989 NCAA Division I-AA independents football standings
| | Conf. | | | Overall |
| Team | W | L | T | W | | L | | T |
|---|---|---|---|---|---|---|---|---|
| No. 1 Georgia Southern ^ | | – | | 15 | – | 0 | – | 0 |
| No. 14 Youngstown State ^ | | – | | 9 | – | 4 | – | 0 |
| No. T–10 William & Mary ^ | | – | | 8 | – | 3 | – | 1 |
| Liberty | | – | | 7 | – | 3 | – | 0 |
| Western Kentucky | | – | | 6 | – | 5 | – | 0 |
| James Madison | | – | | 5 | – | 4 | – | 1 |
| Lamar | | – | | 5 | – | 5 | – | 0 |
| Arkansas State | | – | | 5 | – | 6 | – | 0 |
| Nicholls State | | – | | 5 | – | 6 | – | 0 |
| Samford | | – | | 5 | – | 6 | – | 0 |
| Northeastern | | – | | 3 | – | 7 | – | 0 |
| Fordham | | – | | 2 | – | 6 | – | 0 |
| Towson State | | – | | 2 | – | 8 | – | 0 |
^ – NCAA Division I-AA playoff participant; Rankings from NCAA Division I-AA Football Committee poll

The 1989 Lamar Cardinals football season was the program's final season until reinstatement in 2010. The Cardinals played their home games at the on-campus Cardinal Stadium, now named Provost Umphrey Stadium. The program ended the season and the sport for over 20 years with a home game on November 18 against rival McNeese State. The Cardinals won the game, 22–17.

== Schedule ==
| Date | Opponent | Site | Result | Attendance | Source |
|---|---|---|---|---|---|
| September 2 | at No. 12 (D-II) Angelo State | San Angelo Stadium; San Angelo, TX | L 28–31 | | |
| September 9 | at UTEP | Sun Bowl; El Paso, TX | W 21–19 | 36,632 | |
| September 16 | at West Texas State | Kimbrough Memorial Stadium; Canyon, TX | W 49–17 | | |
| September 23 | Sam Houston State | Cardinal Stadium; Beaumont, TX | W 41–0 | 8,028 | |
| September 30 | Stephen F. Austin | Cardinal Stadium; Beaumont, TX | L 20–44 | | |
| October 7 | No. 10 Arkansas State | Cardinal Stadium; Beaumont, TX | L 31–41 | | |
| October 14 | at Alcorn State | Henderson Stadium; Lorman, MS | L 16–32 | | |
| November 4 | at Southwest Texas State | Bobcat Stadium; San Marcos, TX | W 20–19 | | |
| November 11 | at Southwestern Louisiana | Cajun Field; Lafayette, LA (rivalry) | L 33–42 | | |
| November 18 | McNeese State | Cardinal Stadium; Beaumont, TX (rivalry) | W 22–17 | | |
Rankings from NCAA Division I-AA Football Committee Poll released prior to the game
