= 1989 UMass Minutemen football team =

American college football season

1989 UMass Minutemen football
- Conference: Yankee Conference
- Record: 5–5–1 (3–5 Yankee)
- Head coach: Jim Reid (4th season)
- Home stadium: Warren McGuirk Alumni Stadium

1989 Yankee Conference football standings
	Conf.					Overall
Team	W		L		T	W		L		T
No. 8 Maine +^	6	–	2	–	0	9	–	3	–	0
No. 18 Connecticut +	6	–	2	–	0	8	–	3	–	0
No. 16 Villanova +^	6	–	2	–	0	8	–	4	–	0
New Hampshire	5	–	3	–	0	7	–	3	–	0
Delaware	5	–	3	–	0	7	–	4	–	0
Boston University	4	–	4	–	0	4	–	7	–	0
UMass	3	–	5	–	0	5	–	5	–	1
Rhode Island	1	–	7	–	0	3	–	8	–	0
Richmond	0	–	8	–	0	1	–	10	–	0
+ – Conference co-champions; ^ – NCAA Division I-AA playoff participant; Rankings from NCAA Division I-AA Football Committee poll

The 1989 UMass Minutemen football team represented the University of Massachusetts Amherst in the 1989 NCAA Division I-AA football season as a member of the Yankee Conference. The team was coached by Jim Reid and played its home games at Warren McGuirk Alumni Stadium in Hadley, Massachusetts. UMass finished the season with a record of 5–5–1 overall and 3–5 in conference play.

== Schedule ==
Date	Opponent	Site	Result	Attendance	Source
September 9	James Madison*	McGuirk Stadium; Hadley, MA	T 28–28	9,428	
September 16	at Lehigh*	Goodman Stadium; Bethlehem, PA	W 42–23	6,123	
September 23	at Maine	Alumni Field; Orono, ME	L 23–40	10,389	
September 30	at Boston University	Nickerson Field; Boston, MA	L 19–41	5,655	
October 7	Rhode Island	McGuirk Stadium; Hadley, MA	W 31–6	10,102	
October 14	at Connecticut	Memorial Stadium; Storrs, CT (rivalry)	L 33–39 ^{OT}	12,440	
October 21	Delaware	McGuirk Stadium; Hadley, MA	L 14–21	4,780	
October 28	at Northeastern*	Parsons Field; Brookline, MA	W 31–27	7,060	
November 4	Richmond	McGuirk Stadium; Hadley, MA	W 17–14	5,926	
November 11	at Villanova	Villanova Stadium; Villanova, PA	L 26–29	7,109	
November 18	New Hampshire	McGuirk Stadium; Hadley, MA (rivalry)	W 34–28	4,114	
*Non-conference game
