= 1989 Morgan State Bears football team =

American college football season

1989 Morgan State Bears football
- Conference: Mid-Eastern Athletic Conference
- Record: 3–7–1 (1–5 MEAC)
- Head coach: Ed Wyche (2nd season)
- Home stadium: Hughes Stadium

1989 Mid-Eastern Athletic Conference football standings
	Conf.					Overall
Team	W		L		T	W		L		T
Delaware State $	5	–	1	–	0	7	–	4	–	0
Howard	4	–	2	–	0	8	–	3	–	0
Florida A&M	3	–	3	–	0	6	–	5	–	0
Bethune–Cookman	3	–	3	–	0	5	–	5	–	0
South Carolina State	3	–	3	–	0	5	–	6	–	0
North Carolina A&T	2	–	4	–	0	5	–	6	–	0
Morgan State	1	–	5	–	0	3	–	7	–	1
$ – Conference champion

The 1989 Morgan State Bears football team represented Morgan State University as a member of the Mid-Eastern Athletic Conference (MEAC) during the 1989 NCAA Division I-AA football season. Led by second-year head coach Ed Wyche, the Bears compiled an overall record of 3–7–1, with a mark of 1–6 in conference play, and finished seventh in the MEAC.

== Schedule ==
Date	Opponent	Site	Result	Attendance	Source
September 2	Norfolk State*	Hughes Stadium; Baltimore, MD	W 31–20		
September 9	vs. Bethune–Cookman	Gator Bowl; Jacksonville, FL	L 12–6 (forfeit loss)	7,500	
September 16	vs. Bowie State*	Bulldogs Stadium; Bowie, MD (Jiffy Lube Classic)	T 14–14	4,217	
September 23	North Carolina A&T	Hughes Stadium; Baltimore, MD	W 27–7	4,200	
September 30	at Youngstown State*	Stambaugh Stadium; Youngstown, OH	L 22–45		
October 7	South Carolina State	Hughes Stadium; Baltimore, MD	L 12–38	8,765	
October 14	Virginia Union*^{†}	Hughes Stadium; Baltimore, MD	L 21–38	18,123	
October 21	at Delaware State	Alumni Stadium; Dover, DE	L 12–27	2,617	
October 28	vs. Florida A&M	Miami Orange Bowl; Miami, FL (Orange Blossom Classic)	L 13–31	12,492	
November 4	Howard	Hughes Stadium; Baltimore, MD (rivalry)	L 0–31	8,645	
November 11	Cheyney State*	Hughes Stadium; Baltimore, MD	W 19–12	4,821	
*Non-conference game; ^{†}Homecoming
