= 1989 Delaware State Hornets football team =

American college football season

1989 Delaware State Hornets football

MEAC champion
- Conference: Mid-Eastern Athletic Conference
- Record: 7–4 (5–1 MEAC)
- Head coach: Bill Collick (5th season)
- Home stadium: Alumni Stadium

1989 Mid-Eastern Athletic Conference football standings
	Conf.					Overall
Team	W		L		T	W		L		T
Delaware State $	5	–	1	–	0	7	–	4	–	0
Howard	4	–	2	–	0	8	–	3	–	0
Florida A&M	3	–	3	–	0	6	–	5	–	0
Bethune–Cookman	3	–	3	–	0	5	–	5	–	0
South Carolina State	3	–	3	–	0	5	–	6	–	0
North Carolina A&T	2	–	4	–	0	5	–	6	–	0
Morgan State	1	–	5	–	0	3	–	7	–	1
$ – Conference champion

The 1989 Delaware State Hornets football team represented Delaware State College (now known as Delaware State University) as a member of the Mid-Eastern Athletic Conference (MEAC) during the 1989 NCAA Division I-AA football season. Led by fifth-year head coach Bill Collick, the Hornets compiled an overall record of 7–4, with a mark of 5–1 in conference play, and finished as MEAC champion.

== Schedule ==
Date	Opponent	Rank	Site	Result	Attendance	Source
September 2	vs. Cheyney*		Baynard Stadium; Wilmington, DE (Wilmington Classic)	W 41–0	6,932	
September 9	Eastern Kentucky*		Alumni Stadium; Dover, DE	L 13–48	4,400	
September 16	at Northeastern*		Parsons Field; Brookline, MA	W 11–3		
September 23	at Western Illinois*		Hanson Field; Macomb, IL	L 24–38		
October 7	Bethune–Cookman		Alumni Stadium; Dover, DE	W 28–14		
October 14	at Florida A&M		Bragg Memorial Stadium; Tallahassee, FL	W 18–13	31,003	
October 21	Morgan State		Alumni Stadium; Dover, DE	W 27–12	2,617	
October 28	at South Carolina State		Oliver C. Dawson Stadium; Orangeburg, SC	W 21–13		
November 4	North Carolina A&T^{†}	No. 18	Alumni Stadium; Dover, DE	W 30–7	7,216	
November 11	at Towson State*	No. 13	Minnegan Stadium; Towson, MD	L 17–35	1,511	
November 18	Howard		Alumni Stadium; Dover, DE	L 14–19		
*Non-conference game; ^{†}Homecoming; Rankings from NCAA Division I-AA Football Committee Poll released prior to the game
