= 1989 Youngstown State Penguins football team =

American college football season

1989 Youngstown State Penguins football

NCAA Division I-AA Quarterfinal, L 23–42 at Furman
- Conference: Independent
- Record: 9–4
- Head coach: Jim Tressel (4th season)
- Offensive coordinator: Jim Bollman (1st season)
- Home stadium: Stambaugh Stadium

1989 NCAA Division I-AA independents football standings
	Conf.			Overall
Team	W	L	T	W		L		T
No. 1 Georgia Southern ^		–		15	–	0	–	0
No. 14 Youngstown State ^		–		9	–	4	–	0
No. T–10 William & Mary ^		–		8	–	3	–	1
Liberty		–		7	–	3	–	0
Western Kentucky		–		6	–	5	–	0
James Madison		–		5	–	4	–	1
Lamar		–		5	–	5	–	0
Arkansas State		–		5	–	6	–	0
Nicholls State		–		5	–	6	–	0
Samford		–		5	–	6	–	0
Northeastern		–		3	–	7	–	0
Fordham		–		2	–	6	–	0
Towson State		–		2	–	8	–	0
^ – NCAA Division I-AA playoff participant; Rankings from NCAA Division I-AA Football Committee poll

The 1989 Youngstown State Penguins football team represented Youngstown State University as an independent during the 1989 NCAA Division I-AA football season. Led by fourth-year head coach Jim Tressel, the Penguins compiled an overall record of 9–4. Youngstown State advanced to the NCAA Division I-AA Quarterfinals and were defeated by Furman.

== Schedule ==
Date	Opponent	Rank	Site	Result	Attendance	Source
September 2	at Maine		Alumni Field; Orono, ME	L 14–28	8,050	
September 9	at Eastern Michigan		Rynearson Stadium; Ypsilanti, MI	L 3–14		
September 23	Akron		Stambaugh Stadium; Youngstown, OH (Steel Tire)	W 20–17		
September 30	Morgan State		Stambaugh Stadium; Youngstown, OH	W 45–22		
October 7	at Indiana State		Memorial Stadium; Terre Haute, IN	W 20–19		
October 14	Northeastern	No. 18	Stambaugh Stadium; Youngstown, OH	W 44–0	9,387	
October 21	at Central Michigan	No. T–15	Kelly/Shorts Stadium; Mount Pleasant, MI	W 30–3		
October 28	No. T–18 Western Kentucky	No. 14	Stambaugh Stadium; Youngstown, OH	L 38–41	9,879	
November 4	No. T–13 Liberty		Stambaugh Stadium; Youngstown, OH	W 41–14		
November 11	No. 7 (D-II) Edinboro	No. 19	Stambaugh Stadium; Youngstown, OH	W 28–14		
November 18	Towson State	No. 17	Stambaugh Stadium; Youngstown, OH	W 38–7	5,000	
November 25	at No. 12 Eastern Kentucky	No. 14	Hanger Field; Richmond, KY (NCAA Division I-AA First Round)	W 28–24	3,898	
December 2	at No. 2 Furman	No. 14	Paladin Stadium; Greenville, SC (NCAA Division I-AA Quarterfinal)	L 23–42	8,033	
Rankings from NCAA Division I-AA Football Committee Poll released prior to the game
