= 1989 Western Kentucky Hilltoppers football team =

American college football season

1989 Western Kentucky Hilltoppers football
- Conference: Independent
- Record: 6–5
- Head coach: Jack Harbaugh (1st season)
- Defensive coordinator: Bruce Hoffman (1st season)
- Captains: Russell Foster; Xavier Jordan; Mark Marsh
- Home stadium: L. T. Smith Stadium

1989 NCAA Division I-AA independents football standings
	Conf.			Overall
Team	W	L	T	W		L		T
No. 1 Georgia Southern ^		–		15	–	0	–	0
No. 14 Youngstown State ^		–		9	–	4	–	0
No. T–10 William & Mary ^		–		8	–	3	–	1
Liberty		–		7	–	3	–	0
Western Kentucky		–		6	–	5	–	0
James Madison		–		5	–	4	–	1
Lamar		–		5	–	5	–	0
Arkansas State		–		5	–	6	–	0
Nicholls State		–		5	–	6	–	0
Samford		–		5	–	6	–	0
Northeastern		–		3	–	7	–	0
Fordham		–		2	–	6	–	0
Towson State		–		2	–	8	–	0
^ – NCAA Division I-AA playoff participant; Rankings from NCAA Division I-AA Football Committee poll

The 1989 Western Kentucky Hilltoppers football team represented Western Kentucky University as an independent during the 1989 NCAA Division I-AA football season Led by first-year head coach Jack Harbaugh, the Hilltoppers compiled a record of 6–5.

== Schedule ==
Date	Opponent	Rank	Site	Result	Attendance	Source
September 2	at Illinois State		Hancock Stadium; Normal, IL	W 17–12	4,452	
September 9	at No. 20 Murray State		Roy Stewart Stadium; Murray, KY (rivalry)	L 14–17	8,575	
September 16	No. 18 Middle Tennessee		L. T. Smith Stadium; Bowling Green, KY	W 31–16	14,700	
September 23	at No. 1 Eastern Kentucky	No. 19	Hanger Field; Richmond, KY (rivalry)	L 3–24	19,200	
September 30	Austin Peay	No. T–20	L. T. Smith Stadium; Bowling Green, KY	W 49–0	4,200	
October 7	at Chattanooga	No. 17	Chamberlain Field; Chattanooga, TN	L 7–19	6,207	
October 14	No. 4 Southwest Missouri State		L. T. Smith Stadium; Bowling Green, KY	W 42–33	9,000	
October 21	Tennessee Tech^{†}		L. T. Smith Stadium; Bowling Green, KY	W 61–14	18,000	
October 28	at No. 14 Youngstown State	No. T–18	Stambaugh Stadium; Youngstown, OH	W 41–38	9,879	
November 4	at Louisville	No. 15	Cardinal Stadium; Louisville, KY	L 7–55	36,126	
November 18	No. 18 Eastern Illinois	No. 15	L. T. Smith Stadium; Bowling Green, KY	L 7–10	4,000	
^{†}Homecoming; Rankings from NCAA Division I-AA Football Committee Poll released prior to the game
