= 1989 NCAA Division I-AA football season =

American college football season

1989 NCAA Division I-AA season

Regular season
- Number of teams: 88
- Duration: August–November
- Payton Award: John Friesz (QB, Idaho)

Playoff
- Duration: November 25–December 16
- Championship date: December 16, 1989
- Championship site: Paulson Stadium; Statesboro, Georgia
- Champion: Georgia Southern

NCAA Division I-AA football seasons
- «1988 1990»

The 1989 NCAA Division I-AA football season, part of college football in the United States organized by the National Collegiate Athletic Association at the Division I-AA level, began in August 1989, and concluded with the 1989 NCAA Division I-AA Football Championship Game on December 16, 1989, at Paulson Stadium in Statesboro, Georgia. The Georgia Southern Eagles won their third I-AA championship, defeating the Stephen F. Austin Lumberjacks by a score of 37−34.

== Conference changes and new programs ==
School	1988 Conference	1989 Conference
Davidson	Colonial (I-AA)	D-III Independent
Fordham	Liberty (D-III)	I-AA Independent
Louisiana Tech	I-AA Independent	I-A Independent
Samford	D-III Independent	I-AA Independent

== Conference standings ==
1989 Big Sky Conference football standings
	Conf.					Overall
Team	W		L		T	W		L		T
No. T–4 Idaho $^	8	–	0	–	0	9	–	3	–	0
No. 6 Montana ^	7	–	1	–	0	11	–	3	–	0
No. 19 Nevada	5	–	3	–	0	7	–	4	–	0
Boise State	5	–	3	–	0	6	–	5	–	0
Eastern Washington	4	–	4	–	0	4	–	6	–	0
Northern Arizona	2	–	6	–	0	3	–	8	–	0
Montana State	2	–	6	–	0	4	–	7	–	0
Idaho State	2	–	6	–	0	3	–	7	–	0
Weber State	1	–	7	–	0	3	–	8	–	0
$ – Conference champion; ^ – NCAA Division I-AA playoff participant; Rankings from NCAA Division I-AA Poll

1989 Colonial League football standings
	Conf.					Overall
Team	W		L		T	W		L		T
No. T–4 Holy Cross $	4	–	0	–	0	10	–	1	–	0
Bucknell	2	–	2	–	0	5	–	5	–	0
Lafayette	2	–	2	–	0	5	–	5	–	0
Lehigh	1	–	3	–	0	5	–	6	–	0
Colgate	1	–	3	–	0	4	–	7	–	0
$ – Conference champion; Rankings from NCAA Division I-AA Football Committee poll

1989 Gateway Collegiate Athletic Conference football standings
	Conf.					Overall
Team	W		L		T	W		L		T
No. 9 Southwest Missouri State $^	5	–	1	–	0	10	–	3	–	0
No. 15 Eastern Illinois ^	4	–	2	–	0	9	–	4	–	0
No. 20 Northern Iowa	4	–	2	–	0	8	–	3	–	0
Illinois State	4	–	2	–	0	5	–	6	–	0
Indiana State	2	–	4	–	0	4	–	7	–	0
Western Illinois	1	–	5	–	0	4	–	7	–	0
Southern Illinois	1	–	5	–	0	2	–	9	–	0
$ – Conference champion; ^ – NCAA Division I-AA playoff participant; Rankings from NCAA Division I-AA Football Committee poll

1989 Ivy League football standings
	Conf.					Overall
Team	W		L		T	W		L		T
Yale +	6	–	1	–	0	8	–	2	–	0
Princeton +	6	–	1	–	0	7	–	2	–	1
Harvard	5	–	2	–	0	5	–	5	–	0
Dartmouth	4	–	3	–	0	5	–	5	–	0
Cornell	2	–	5	–	0	4	–	6	–	0
Penn	2	–	5	–	0	4	–	6	–	0
Brown	2	–	5	–	0	2	–	8	–	0
Columbia	1	–	6	–	0	1	–	9	–	0
+ – Conference co-champions

1989 Mid-Eastern Athletic Conference football standings
	Conf.					Overall
Team	W		L		T	W		L		T
Delaware State $	5	–	1	–	0	7	–	4	–	0
Howard	4	–	2	–	0	8	–	3	–	0
Florida A&M	3	–	3	–	0	6	–	5	–	0
Bethune–Cookman	3	–	3	–	0	5	–	5	–	0
South Carolina State	3	–	3	–	0	5	–	6	–	0
North Carolina A&T	2	–	4	–	0	5	–	6	–	0
Morgan State	1	–	5	–	0	3	–	7	–	1
$ – Conference champion

1989 Ohio Valley Conference football standings
	Conf.					Overall
Team	W		L		T	W		L		T
No. T–10 Middle Tennessee $^	6	–	0	–	0	9	–	4	–	0
No. 12 Eastern Kentucky ^	5	–	1	–	0	9	–	3	–	0
Murray State	3	–	3	–	0	6	–	4	–	1
Tennessee State	3	–	3	–	0	5	–	5	–	1
Tennessee Tech	3	–	3	–	0	5	–	5	–	0
Austin Peay	1	–	5	–	0	1	–	10	–	0
Morehead State	0	–	6	–	0	1	–	10	–	0
$ – Conference champion; ^ – NCAA Division I-AA playoff participant; Records adjusted for Morehead State forfeit of conference victories over Austin Peay and Tennessee Tech, and non-conference victories over Kentucky State and Samford; Rankings from NCAA Division I-AA Football Committee poll

1989 Southern Conference football standings
	Conf.					Overall
Team	W		L		T	W		L		T
No. 2 Furman $^	7	–	0	–	0	12	–	2	–	0
No. 7 Appalachian State ^	5	–	2	–	0	9	–	3	–	0
Marshall	4	–	3	–	0	6	–	5	–	0
East Tennessee State	4	–	3	–	0	4	–	7	–	0
Chattanooga	2	–	4	–	1	3	–	7	–	1
Western Carolina	1	–	4	–	1	3	–	7	–	1
VMI	1	–	4	–	1	2	–	8	–	1
The Citadel	1	–	5	–	1	5	–	5	–	1
$ – Conference champion; ^ – NCAA Division I-AA playoff participant; Rankings from NCAA Division I-AA Football Committee poll

1989 Southland Conference football standings
	Conf.					Overall
Team	W		L		T	W		L		T
No. 3 Stephen F. Austin $^	5	–	0	–	1	12	–	2	–	1
Northwestern State	3	–	1	–	2	4	–	5	–	2
SW Texas State	3	–	3	–	0	5	–	6	–	0
Northeast Louisiana	2	–	3	–	1	4	–	6	–	1
McNeese State	2	–	4	–	0	5	–	6	–	0
North Texas	2	–	4	–	0	5	–	6	–	0
Sam Houston State	2	–	4	–	0	3	–	8	–	0
$ – Conference champion; ^ – NCAA Division I-AA playoff participant; Rankings from NCAA Division I-AA Football Committee poll

1989 Southwestern Athletic Conference football standings
	Conf.					Overall
Team	W		L		T	W		L		T
No. 13 Grambling State $^	7	–	0	–	0	9	–	3	–	0
No. 17 Jackson State ^	5	–	2	–	0	8	–	4	–	0
Alcorn State	5	–	2	–	0	7	–	3	–	0
Southern	4	–	3	–	0	6	–	4	–	1
Texas Southern	3	–	3	–	1	3	–	7	–	1
Alabama State	2	–	4	–	1	5	–	5	–	1
Prairie View A&M	1	–	6	–	0	1	–	9	–	0
Mississippi Valley State	0	–	7	–	0	1	–	9	–	0
$ – Conference champion; ^ – NCAA Division I-AA playoff participant; Rankings from NCAA Division I-AA Football Committee poll

1989 Yankee Conference football standings
	Conf.					Overall
Team	W		L		T	W		L		T
No. 8 Maine +^	6	–	2	–	0	9	–	3	–	0
No. 18 Connecticut +	6	–	2	–	0	8	–	3	–	0
No. 16 Villanova +^	6	–	2	–	0	8	–	4	–	0
New Hampshire	5	–	3	–	0	7	–	3	–	0
Delaware	5	–	3	–	0	7	–	4	–	0
Boston University	4	–	4	–	0	4	–	7	–	0
UMass	3	–	5	–	0	5	–	5	–	1
Rhode Island	1	–	7	–	0	3	–	8	–	0
Richmond	0	–	8	–	0	1	–	10	–	0
+ – Conference co-champions; ^ – NCAA Division I-AA playoff participant; Rankings from NCAA Division I-AA Football Committee poll

1989 NCAA Division I-AA independents football standings
	Conf.			Overall
Team	W	L	T	W		L		T
No. 1 Georgia Southern ^		–		15	–	0	–	0
No. 14 Youngstown State ^		–		9	–	4	–	0
No. T–10 William & Mary ^		–		8	–	3	–	1
Liberty		–		7	–	3	–	0
Western Kentucky		–		6	–	5	–	0
James Madison		–		5	–	4	–	1
Lamar		–		5	–	5	–	0
Arkansas State		–		5	–	6	–	0
Nicholls State		–		5	–	6	–	0
Samford		–		5	–	6	–	0
Northeastern		–		3	–	7	–	0
Fordham		–		2	–	6	–	0
Towson State		–		2	–	8	–	0
^ – NCAA Division I-AA playoff participant; Rankings from NCAA Division I-AA Football Committee poll

== Conference champions ==
Conference Champions

Big Sky Conference – Idaho
Colonial League – Holy Cross
Gateway Collegiate Athletic Conference – Southwest Missouri State
Ivy League – Princeton and Yale
Mid-Eastern Athletic Conference – Delaware State
Ohio Valley Conference – Middle Tennessee State
Southern Conference – Furman
Southland Conference – Stephen F. Austin
Southwestern Athletic Conference – Jackson State
Yankee Conference – Connecticut, Maine, and Villanova

== Postseason ==
The top four teams were seeded, and thus assured of home games in the opening round. The location of the final, the Georgia Southern Eagles' Paulson Stadium, had been predetermined via a three-year agreement the university reached with the NCAA in February 1989.

=== NCAA Division I-AA playoff bracket ===
First Round; November 25; Campus sites
Villanova	36
(1) Georgia Southern*	52
Appalachian State	21
Middle Tennessee*	24
Eastern Illinois	38
(4) Idaho*	21
Jackson State	7
Montana*	48
William & Mary	10
(2) Furman*	24
Youngstown State	28
Eastern Kentucky*	24
Grambling State	56
(3) Stephen F. Austin*	59
Maine	35
Southwest Missouri State*	38

Quarterfinals; December 2 Campus sites
(1) Georgia Southern*	45
Middle Tennessee	3
Eastern Illinois	19
Montana*	25
(2) Furman*	42
Youngstown State	23
(3) Stephen F. Austin*	55
Southwest Missouri State	25

Semifinals; December 9 Campus sites
(1) Georgia Southern*	45
Montana	15
(2) Furman*	19
(3) Stephen F. Austin	21

National Championship Game; December 16; Paulson Stadium; Statesboro, GA
(1) Georgia Southern	37
(3) Stephen F. Austin	34

* Denotes host institution
