= Allen E. Paulson Stadium =

Football stadium in Statesboro, Georgia, U.S.

- "The Prettiest Little Stadium in America" "Our House" "The House that Erk Built"
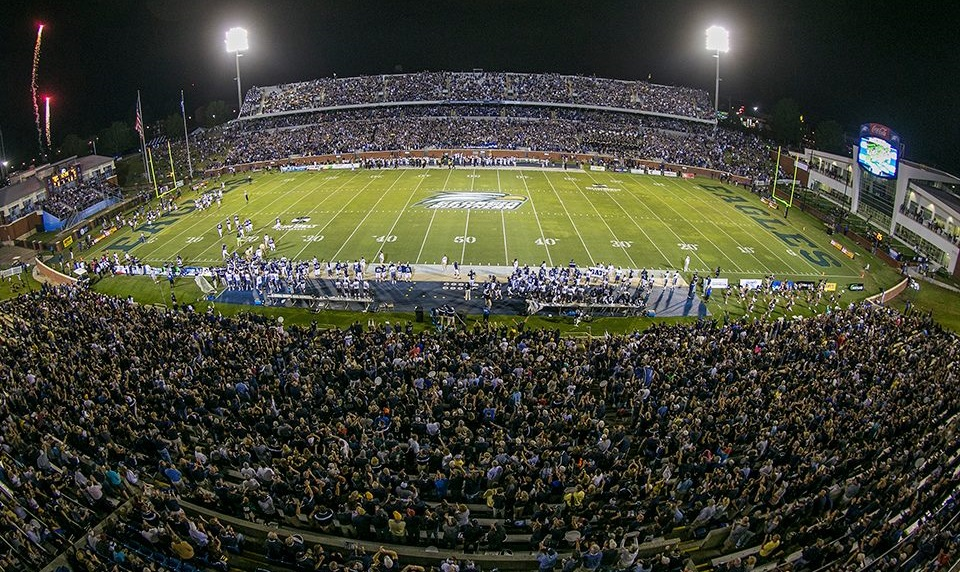
- Paulson Stadium on September 25, 2014, where a then-record crowd of 24,535 saw Georgia Southern defeat Appalachian State

- Location in Georgia Location in the United States
- Location: 207 Lanier Dr. Statesboro, Georgia 30458
- Coordinates: 32°24′44″N 81°46′59″W
- Owner: Georgia Southern University
- Operator: Georgia Southern University
- Capacity: 25,000
- Executive suites: 26 private booster boxes, film deck and a two-level working press box.
- Surface: FieldTurf Vertex Prestige with CoolPlay
- Record attendance: 26,483

Construction
- Groundbreaking: 1983
- Opened: September 29, 1984
- Renovated: 2005, 2006, 2007, 2008, 2014
- Expanded: 2012, 2013, 2014
- Cost: US$4.7 million ($14.6 million in 2025 dollars) $10 million (2014 expansion)
- Architect: Heery-Fabrap, Inc.

Tenant
- Georgia Southern Eagles (NCAA) (1984–present)

Website
- https://www.gseagles.com

Evans Family Field at Allen E. Paulson Stadium is a 25,000-seat on-campus football stadium in Statesboro, Georgia. It is home to the Georgia Southern Eagles football team and the focal point of Erk Russell Athletic Park.

Paulson Stadium was dedicated on September 29, 1984, with a 48–11 win over Liberty University. The game was a fitting end to four years of planning one of the finest I-AA facilities in America. The phrase "Prettiest Little Stadium in America" was coined by former Coach Erk Russell. The stadium has also come to be known as "Our House" to reflect the extreme home field advantage (Overall record of 193–41 and home playoff record of 33–3). This extreme home field advantage consistently ranks in the top 5 of all FBS programs and has become known as "The Power of Paulson." As of the completion of the 2024 season, the Eagles boast a 218-51 (.810) overall record at Paulson Stadium.

== History ==
The stadium is named for the late Allen E. Paulson, founder and owner of Gulfstream Aerospace, who donated more than $1 million toward construction of the facility. The late State Senator Glenn Bryant of Hinesville donated over $250,000 for the property. To recognize his gift, the playing surface of the stadium was named Glenn Bryant Field until 2024. The field was renamed to Evans Family Field ahead of the 2024 season after Brianna and RT Evans of Evans General Contractors donated $3 million to the Georgia Southern Athletics, the single largest donation in university history.

The first game in Paulson was originally scheduled for September 1, 1984, against the Florida A&M Rattlers, but construction delayed by wet weather forced this game to be played in Savannah. The first touchdown scored was a 36-yard run around the right side by quarterback Tracy Ham against Liberty Baptist on September 29, 1984.

== Features ==
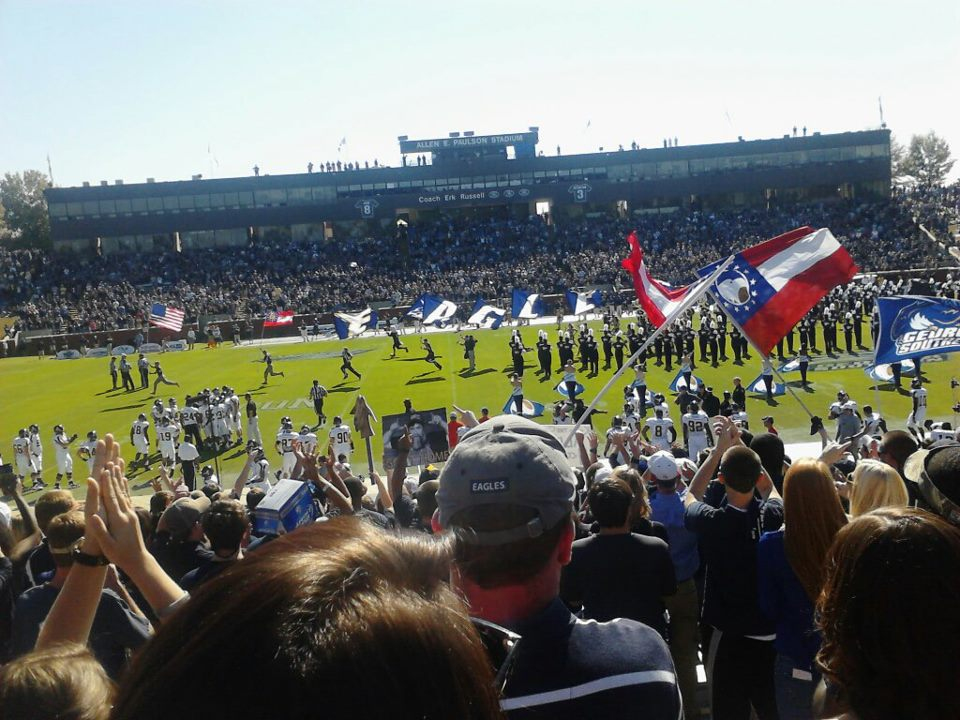
Paulson Stadium during the pregame show with the Southern Pride marching band.

26 climate-controlled private boxes, along with separate Eagle Club and President's Luxury Sky Suites, plus a 50-seat pressbox and film deck overlook the playing surface on the south side of the stadium. Prior to the start of the 2005 season, a brick façade was built along the walls of Paulson Stadium while the video scoreboard was also surrounded with a brick garden/façade. Built in 2006, the Gene Bishop Fieldhouse sits in the western open end of the natural bowl, replacing the Lupton Building, the stadium's original fieldhouse. The field level of the Bishop Fieldhouse includes team and officials dressing rooms, while the second-level houses a hospitality room and club-level seating. In the summer of 2007, the south concourse was improved with red brick walls on the concession stands and a paver sidewalk, and the stadium's parking area was also updated. The north concourse received similar renovations during the spring semester of 2008. Also following the death of legendary coach Erk Russell, a bust was added along the fence near the Gene Bishop Fieldhouse.

From the stadium's opening in 1984 until the end of the 2015 season, Paulson Stadium used a natural grass surface. On February 5, 2016, the university's athletic department announced that an artificial surface supplied by Shaw Sports Turf of Calhoun would be installed for the 2016 season. In 2023, the playing field and adjacent newly constructed Anthony P. Tippins Family Training Facility were outfitted with new FieldTurf Vertex Prestige artificial turf with a CoolPlay top layer.

== Expansion ==
The stadium was scheduled to undergo a massive construction and expansion project beginning in the offseason of 2012. However, the start of the project was delayed until the 2013 offseason. This expansion project increased Paulson Stadium's total capacity to 25,000 and moved all of Georgia Southern's football facilities to a state-of-the-art Football Operations Center onsite. At the time the plan was originally announced, the 57,000-square foot facility was intended to be first of class at the FCS level and rival many at the FBS level; at the time of completion, Georgia Southern was a transitional FBS member in the Sun Belt Conference. The Ted Smith Family Football Center consists of coaches' offices, team meeting rooms, locker rooms, rehabilitation rooms, weight room and the Georgia Southern Football Hall of Fame. The $10 million facility is the largest privately funded project in the history of Georgia Southern University. The northern mid-deck was completed in time for the Spring 2014 commencement ceremony while the Ted Smith Family Football Center was formally dedicated on August 16, 2014.

== Attendance records ==
Highest attendance at Paulson Stadium
Rank	Attendance	Date	Game result
1	26,483	Saturday, September 30, 2023	Georgia Southern 38, Coastal Carolina 28
2	25,735	Saturday, September 17, 2016	Georgia Southern 23, Louisiana–Monroe 21
3	25,725	Saturday, December 16, 1989	Georgia Southern 37, Stephen F. Austin 34
4	25,428	Saturday, October 18, 2025	Georgia Southern 41, Georgia State 24
5	24,872	Saturday, September 19, 2015	Georgia Southern 48, The Citadel 13
6	24,585	Saturday, September 13, 2025	Georgia Southern 41, Jacksonville State 34
7	24,535	Thursday, September 25, 2014	Georgia Southern 34, Appalachian State 14
8	24,134	Saturday, August 31, 2024	Boise State 56, Georgia Southern 45
9	24,112	Saturday, September 26, 2026	Houston 42, Georgia Southern 28
10	24,078	Saturday, November 11, 1989	Georgia Southern 34, Chattanooga 13

Italics indicate games played as an FCS program (prior to the 2014 inaugural FBS season)

== See also ==
- List of NCAA Division I FBS football stadiums

Preceded by Holt Arena	Host of the NCAA Division I-AA National Championship Game; 1989–1991	Succeeded by Marshall University Stadium
