= 1989 NCAA Division I-AA football rankings =

The 1989 NCAA Division I-AA football rankings are from the NCAA Division I-AA football committee. This is for the 1989 season.

== Legend ==
	Increase in ranking
	Decrease in ranking
	Not ranked previous week
(#–#)	Win–loss record
(Italics)	Number of first place votes
т	Tied with team above or below also with this symbol

== NCAA Division I-AA Football Committee poll ==
	Preseason	Week 1 Sept 19	Week 2 Sept 26	Week 3 Oct 3	Week 4 Oct 10	Week 5 Oct 17	Week 6 Oct 24	Week 7 Oct 31	Week 8 Nov 7	Week 9 Nov 14	Week 10 Nov 21	
1.	Furman (4)	Eastern Kentucky (2–0) (3)	Eastern Kentucky (3–0) (2) т	Eastern Kentucky (4–0) (3)	Eastern Kentucky (5–0) (3)	Eastern Kentucky (6–0) (3)	Eastern Kentucky (7–0) (3)	Eastern Kentucky (8–0) (3)	Georgia Southern (9–0) (4)	Georgia Southern (10–0) (4)	Georgia Southern (11–0) (4)	1.
2.	Georgia Southern	North Texas (2–0)	North Texas (3–0) (1) т	Georgia Southern (4–0) (1)	Georgia Southern (5–0) (1)	Georgia Southern (6–0) (1)	Georgia Southern (7–0) (1)	Georgia Southern (8–0) (1)	Furman (8–1)	Furman (9–1)	Furman (10–1)	2.
3.	North Texas	Georgia Southern (3–0) (1)	Georgia Southern (4–0) (1)	Holy Cross (4–0)	Holy Cross (5–0)	Furman (5–1)	Furman (6–1)	Furman (7–1)	Stephen F. Austin (8–1)	Stephen F. Austin (9–1)	Stephen F. Austin (9–1–1)	3.
4.	Eastern Kentucky	Holy Cross (2–0)	Holy Cross (3–0)	Furman (3–1) т	Southwest Missouri State (6–0)	Maine (7–0)	Maine (8–0)	Stephen F. Austin (7–1)	Eastern Kentucky (8–1)	Holy Cross (9–1)	Holy Cross (10–1) т	4.
5.	Delaware	Furman (2–1) т	Furman (2–1) т	North Texas (3–1) т	Furman (4–1)	Stephen F. Austin (5–1)	Stephen F. Austin (6–1)	Southwest Missouri State (8–1)	Southwest Missouri State (8–1)	Idaho (8–2)	Idaho (9–2) т	5.
6.	Idaho т	Southwest Missouri State (3–0) т	Southwest Missouri State (4–0) т	Southwest Missouri State (5–0) т	Maine (6–0)	Arkansas State (4–2)	Boise State (5–2)	Holy Cross (7–1)	Holy Cross (8–1)	Montana (9–2)	Montana (9–2)	6.
7.	Jackson State т	Marshall (3–0)	The Citadel (3–0)	The Citadel (4–0)	The Citadel (4–0–1)	Boise State (4–2)	Southwest Missouri State (7–1)	Idaho (7–2)	Idaho (8–2)	Appalachian State (8–2)	Appalachian State (9–2)	7.
8.	Northwestern State т (Note: In the actual printed polls, Northwestern State was listed as Northwestern Louisiana)	Arkansas State (1–1)	Maine (4–0)	Maine (5–0)	Appalachian State (5–1)	Southwest Missouri State (6–1)	Holy Cross (6–1)	Maine (8–1)	Montana (8–2)	Maine (9–2)	Maine (9–2)	8.
9.	Holy Cross т	Maine (3–0)	Delaware (3–0)	Appalachian State (4–1)	Arkansas State (3–2)	Holy Cross (5–1)	Idaho (6–2) т	Montana (7–2)	Appalachian State (7–2)	Southwest Missouri State (8–2)	Southwest Missouri State (9–2)	9.
10.	Southwest Missouri State	Delaware (2–0)	Murray State (3–1)	Arkansas State (2–2)	Stephen F. Austin (4–1)	Northwestern State (4–2)	Liberty (6–0) т	Appalachian State (6–2)	Maine (8–2)	Eastern Kentucky (8–2)	Middle Tennessee State (8–3) т	10.
11.	Marshall	The Citadel (2–0) т	Appalachian State (3–1)	Boise State (2–2)	Boise State (3–2)	Liberty (5–0)	Youngstown State (5–2)	Murray State (5–3–1) т	Murray State (5–3–1)	William & Mary (7–2–1)	William & Mary (8–2–1) т	11.
12.	Boise State т	Northeast Louisiana (2–0) т	Arkansas State (1–2)	Stephen F. Austin (3–1)	Jackson State (5–1)	William & Mary (4–1–1)	Northwestern State (4–2–1)	Villanova (6–2) т	William & Mary (6–2–1)	Middle Tennessee State (7–3)	Eastern Kentucky (9–2)	12.
13.	James Madison т	James Madison (2–0–1)	Boise State (1–2)	Jackson State (4–1)	Northwestern State т	Marshall (4–2)	Eastern Illinois (6–2)	Boise State (5–3) т	Delaware State (7–2)	Yale (8–1)	Grambling State (9–2)	13.
14.	Indiana State	Boise State (1–1)	Stephen F. Austin (2–1)	Delaware (3–1)	William & Mary (3–1–1) т	Idaho (5–2)	Montana (6–2)	Liberty (6–1) т	Middle Tennessee State (6–3)	Grambling State (8–2)	Youngstown State (8–3)	14.
15.	Florida A&M т	Murray State (2–1) т	Jackson State (3–1)	Western Illinois (3–2)	Idaho (4–2)	The Citadel (4–1–1) т	Appalachian State (5–2)	Western Kentucky (6–3)	Yale (7–1)	Western Kentucky (6–4)	Eastern Illinois (8–3)	15.
16.	UMass т (Note: In the actual printed polls, UMass was listed as Massachusetts)	William & Mary (2–0) т	Marshall (3–1)	Marshall (3–1)	North Texas (3–2)	Youngstown State (4–2) т	Murray State (5–2–1)	William & Mary (5–2–1)	Grambling State (7–2)	New Hampshire (7–2)	Villanova (8–3)	16.
17.	Stephen F. Austin	Stephen F. Austin (1–1)	Western Illinois (3–1)	Western Kentucky (3–2)	Liberty (4–0)	Murray State (5–2)	Villanova (5–2)	Northern Iowa (6–2)	Western Kentucky (6–4)	Youngstown State (7–3)	Jackson State (8–3)	17.
18.	Middle Tennessee State	Jackson State (2–1)	Northeast Louisiana (2–1)	Connecticut (3–1)	Youngstown State (3–2)	Appalachian State (5–2)	Arkansas State (4–3) т	Delaware State (6–2)	New Hampshire (6–2)	Eastern Illinois (7–3)	Connecticut (8–3)	18.
19.	Arkansas State	Western Kentucky (2–1)	William & Mary (2–0–1)	Eastern Illinois (4–1)	Murray State (4–2)	Eastern Illinois (5–2)	Western Kentucky (5–3) т	Marshall (5–3)	Youngstown State (6–3)	Alcorn State (7–2)	Nevada	19.
20.	William & Mary	Appalachian State (2–1)	James Madison (2–1–1) т	Idaho (3–2)	Eastern Illinois (4–2) т	Montana (5–2)	Alcorn State (5–1)	Yale (6–1)	Alcorn State (6–2)	Boise State (6–4)	Northern Iowa (8–3)	20.
21.			Western Kentucky (2–2) т		Marshall (3–2) т							21.
22.					Montana (4–2) т							22.
23.					Yale (3–1) т							23.
	Preseason	Week 1 Sept 19	Week 2 Sept 26	Week 3 Oct 3	Week 4 Oct 10	Week 5 Oct 17	Week 6 Oct 24	Week 7 Oct 31	Week 8 Nov 7	Week 9 Nov 14	Week 10 Nov 21	
		Dropped: 6 Idaho; 8 Northwestern State; 14 Indiana State; 15 Florida A&M; 16 UMass; 18 Middle Tennessee State	None	Dropped: 10 Murray State; 18 Northeast Louisiana; 19 William & Mary; 20 James Madison	Dropped: 14 Delaware; 15 Western Illinois; 17 Western Kentucky; 18 Connecticut	Dropped: 12 Jackson State; 16 North Texas; 20 Yale	Dropped: 12 William & Mary; 13 Marshall; 15 The Citadel	Dropped: 11 Youngstown State; 12 Northwestern State; 13 Eastern Illinois; 18 Arkansas State; 20 Alcorn State	Dropped: 12 Villanova; 13 Boise State; 14 Liberty; 17 Northern Iowa; 19 Marshall	Dropped: 11 Murray State; 13 Delaware State	Dropped: 13 Yale; 15 Western Kentucky; 16 New Hampshire; 19 Alcorn State; 20 Boise State	
