= 1990 San Diego Chargers season =

NFL team 31st season

- Owner: Alex Spanos
- General manager: Bobby Beathard
- Head coach: Dan Henning
- Home stadium: Jack Murphy Stadium

Results
- Record: 6–10
- Division place: 4th AFC West
- Playoffs: Did not qualify
- All-Pros: 1: RB Marion Butts (2nd team)
- Pro Bowlers: 3: RB Marion Butts; WR Anthony Miller; DE Leslie O'Neal

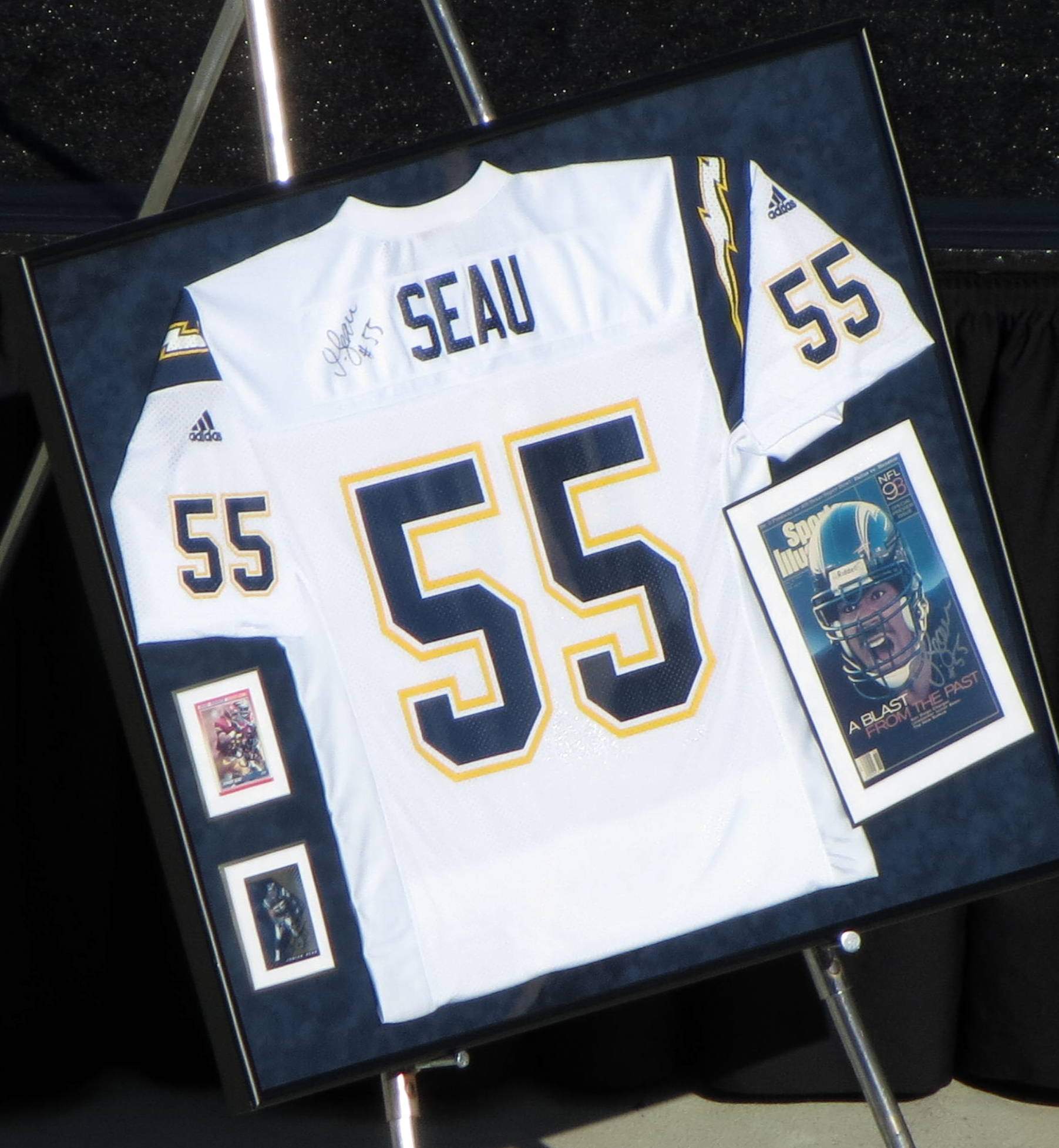
A Junior Seau jersey showing his retired number, 55. Seau began a 13-year stint in the Charger defense in 1990.

The 1990 San Diego Chargers season was the franchise's 21st season in the National Football League (NFL) and its 31st overall. After a 1–4 start, the Chargers recovered to 5–5, only half a game out of the playoff places. Five losses in their final six games, however, saw them finish with a 6–10 record for the third consecutive season. Only one of San Diego's six victories came against a team with a winning record, and none were against eventual playoff teams. As had been the case in 1989, close finishes were a problem—the Chargers were 0–5 in games decided by seven points or fewer.

During the offseason, Bobby Beathard joined the Chargers as their general manager, beginning a ten-year tenure with the club. His first draft choice was Junior Seau, who would go on to have his number retired by the Chargers after playing in San Diego for the first thirteen seasons of his Hall of Fame career. In 1990, Seau was part of a strong defense that ranked 5th in the league, with linebacker Leslie O'Neal and cornerback Gill Byrd enjoying strong seasons. On offense, the Chargers continued a recent trend of trying multiple starting quarterbacks during the season, with Billy Joe Tolliver seeing the most action. The passing game was ranked well below the league average, but the Chargers had much more success while running the ball, with Marion Butts gaining 1,225 yards, a club record at the time.

== Offseason ==
=== General manager appointment ===
On December 18, 1989, the Chargers announced that Director of Football Operations Steve Ortmayer's contract would not be renewed, leaving a vacancy in personnel management. While Ortmayer's draft choices included some notable successes, such as Pro Bowl wide receiver Anthony Miller and starting tackle David Richards, his trade activity had been less successful, with several acquisitions earning little competitive playing time; Ortmayer signed Jim McMahon before the 1989 season to be the new starting quarterback, but McMahon ended the season on the bench. Contract negotiations under Ortmayer were also an issue, with Chip Banks and running back Gary Anderson both holding out for entire seasons.

Team owner Alex Spanos had expressed an interest in signing Bobby Beathard to a front-office role in May 1989, shortly after Beathard quit as general manager of Washington, where he had won two of his four Super Bowl rings. Beathard had declined, preferring to take a year away from football, but was immediately rumoured to be Ortmayer's most likely successor. He was officially named to the role of general manager on January 3, with complete control over personnel. Beathard reflected that he'd missed being active in football during his year working as an analyst for NBC, saying, "I've got that feeling of excitement inside again. I'll be doing the thing I feel most comfortable doing."

=== Departures and arrivals ===
The previous season's free-agent quarterback signing, McMahon, was reluctant to sign a new contract based around performance incentives, which was the preference of head coach Dan Henning. After conferring with Beathard, Henning released McMahon on April 26. Billy Joe Tolliver, who had started five games the previous year, was left the frontrunner for the vacant quarterback job.

Another departure was center Don Macek, whose entire fourteen-year career was spent in San Diego, encompassing the entirety of Don Coryell's time as Charger head coach. Macek had missed the bulk of the previous two seasons through injury, and announced his retirement in April. Other departures from the offensive line included James Fitzpatrick and Brett Miller, who were both left unprotected from Plan B free newspaper. At the skill positions, Anderson and wide receiver Jamie Holland were traded away for draft picks.

The Chargers boosted both their running and receiving corps when they acquired Ronnie Harmon through Plan B free agency. The former Bill, who would go on to have 378 catches and 332 carries during his six seasons with the team, was rumoured to have chosen San Diego over the Cardinals because Martin Luther King Day was not an official state holiday in Phoenix. Midseason addition Steve Hendrickson, signed primarily as a linebacker, also spent some time in the offensive backfield as an H-back or fullback, positions he had played in high school.

Overall, more than half the final-game roster of 1989 was gone by the start of the 1990 season, with some veteran players among the final cuts. Dennis McKnight, a Charger since 1982, was trying to come back from a serious quad injury. He played in every preseason game, but was cut six days before the regular season began. Running back Tim Spencer was also cut, after five years with the team; he was resigned to the squad for four games late in the season, but had no carries and was released again at the end of the year.

There were fewer changes to the defense, which had ranked sixth in the league in 1989, though cornerback Elvis Patterson was one of three Chargers picked up by the Los Angeles Raiders in Plan B free agency. Undrafted rookie defensive back Donald Frank and former Tampa Bay linebacker Henry Rolling both made the squad, and would start games in the season ahead.

On special teams, the Chargers released both their kicker and their punter for the second consecutive season, Chris Bahr and Hank Ilesic having posted inconsistent campaigns. Punter John Kidd was picked up from the Bills via Plan B free agency, while Kitrick Taylor and Donnie Elder joined the team during the course of the season as returners of punts and kickoffs respectively. Four kickers competed for the role vacated by Bahr. Fuad Reveiz and John Carney emerged ahead of Barry Belli and Tom Whelihan as the frontrunners for the vacant position, with Reveiz initially winning the job in preseason. When Reveiz struggled through the first four weeks, the Chargers switched to Carney, who would stay with the team for eleven seasons, scoring over 1,000 points.

=== NFL draft ===
San Diego held the fifth overall pick in the draft. Numerous projections had them taking tackle Richmond Webb, with linebacker Junior Seau taken by New England, picking third. Beathard openly expressed an interest in Webb. The Patriots, however, traded their pick to Seattle on draft day. When neither the Seahawks nor the Buccaneers (choosing fourth) selected Seau, Beathard gratefully drafted him. Henning reflected, "When you get a player like Junior Seau your defense is going to become better regardless of what situation he's in." Seau, a native of San Diego County, described himself as "thrilled" with the outcome. He held out through much of training camp and preseason, but signed a five-year deal worth $910,000 annually, seventeen days before the Chargers' regular-season opener against Dallas. Seau went on to play for 13 seasons in San Diego, with the club retiring his number 55 jersey in 2012.

The Chargers had seventeen picks in total, although thirteen of these were in the sixth round or later. Their second-round pick had gone to the Bears as part of the McMahon trade, so their next selections came in the third round. Of these, Leo Goeas had the biggest impact, starting ten games at left tackle in 1990, and eighteen in total over three seasons in San Diego. In the later rounds, the Chargers picked four players who would make the squad: quarterback John Friesz won the starting job in 1991; Frank Cornish started every game at center during his rookie year; tight end Derrick Walker had 979 receiving yards across four seasons in San Diego; and wide receiver Nate Lewis had 1,789 and 12 touchdowns over the same period.

1990 San Diego Chargers draft
Round	Pick	Player	Position	College	Notes
1	5	Junior Seau ^{†}	Linebacker	USC	
3	57	Jeff Mills	Linebacker	Nebraska	
3	60	Leo Goeas	Guard	Hawaii	
3	67	Walter Wilson	Wide receiver	East Carolina	
6	138	John Friesz	Quarterback	Idaho	
6	143	Frank Cornish	Center	UCLA	
6	145	David Pool	Cornerback	Carson-Newman	
6	163	Derrick Walker	Tight end	Michigan	
7	172	Jeff Novak	Guard	Southwest Texas State	
7	185	Joe Staysniak	Guard	Ohio State	
7	187	Nate Lewis	Wide Receiver	Oregon Tech	
7	193	Keith Collins	Defensive back	Appalachian State	
8	201	J. J. Flannigan	Running back	Colorado	
9	227	Chris Goetz	Guard	Pittsburgh	
10	256	Kenny Berry	Defensive back	Miami (FL)	
11	283	Tommie Stowers	Tight end	Missouri	
12	326	Elliott Searcy	Wide receiver	Southern	
Made roster † Pro Football Hall of Fame * Made at least one Pro Bowl during career

== Personnel ==
=== Staff ===
1990 San Diego Chargers staff
Front office: Chairman of the board and president – Alex Spanos; Vice chairman – Dean Spanos; General manager – Bobby Beathard; Assistant general manager – Dick Daniels; Director of player personnel – Billy Devaney; Director of pro personnel – Rudy Feldman; Director of college scouting – John Hinek; Coordinator of football operations – Marty Hurney; Head coaches: Head coach – Dan Henning; Offensive coaches: Assistant head coach/quarterbacks – Ted Tollner; Offensive backs – Bobby Jackson; Receivers – Charlie Joiner; Tight ends – Ed White; Offensive line – Alex Gibbs; Offensive assistant – Jack Reilly	Defensive coaches: Defensive coordinator – Ron Lynn; Defensive line – Gunther Cunningham; Linebackers – Mike Haluchak; Secondary – Jim L. Mora; Special teams coaches: Special teams coordinator – Larry Pasquale; Special teams assistant – LeCharls McDaniel; Strength and conditioning: Strength and conditioning – John Dunn

=== Roster ===
1990 San Diego Chargers roster
Quarterbacks (QB): 17 John Friesz; 11 Billy Joe Tolliver; 13 Mark Vlasic; Running backs (RB): 82 Rod Bernstine; 35 Marion Butts; 33 Ronnie Harmon; 34 Steve Hendrickson FB; 20 Darrin Nelson; 43 Tim Spencer; Wide receivers (WR): 87 Quinn Early; 81 Nate Lewis; 83 Anthony Miller; 85 Kitrick Taylor PR; 84 Walter Wilson; Tight ends (TE): 88 Arthur Cox; 31 Craig McEwen; 37 Terry Orr; 89 Derrick Walker	Offensive linemen (OL): 71 Dean Brown G; 63 Frank Cornish C; 61 Eric Floyd G/T; 67 Leo Goeas T; 53 Courtney Hall G; 65 David Richards G; 64 Mark Rodenhauser; 76 Broderick Thompson T; 70 Mike Zandofsky G; Defensive linemen (DL): 97 George Hinkle; 98 Gerald Robinson DE; 99 Lee Williams DE	Linebackers (LB): 51 Cedric Figaro ILB; 91 Leslie O'Neal OLB; 50 Gary Plummer ILB; 57 Henry Rolling OLB; 55 Junior Seau ILB; 54 Billy Ray Smith OLB; Defensive backs (DB): 44 Martin Bayless SS; 22 Gill Byrd CB; 28 Donnie Elder; 27 Donald Frank; 25 Vencie Glenn FS; 38 Sammy Lilly CB; 24 Lester Lyles SS; 30 Sam Seale CB; 23 Anthony Shelton CB/S; Special teams (ST): 3 John Carney K; 10 John Kidd P	Practice squad: 86 Ron Heard WR; 21 Derrick Kelson CB/S; Reserve: 58 David Brandon LB (IR); 90 Richard Brown LB (IR); 46 Joe Caravello TE (IR); 92 Burt Grossman DE (IR); 36 Joe Mickles RB (IR); 69 Les Miller NT (IR); 78 Joel Patten G/T (IR); 75 Joe Phillips NT (NF-Inj.); 79 Tony Savage NT (IR); 68 Mike Simmonds G (IR); 80 Wayne Walker WR (IR); 59 Ken Woodard LB (IR); Rookies in italics 47 active, 12 reserve, 2 practice squad

== Preseason ==
The starting quarterback job was up for grabs going into the Chargers’ quartet of preseason games, projected starter Tolliver having struggled in a controlled scrimmage with the Cardinals a week prior. Both Tolliver (9 of 15, 108 yards) and Mark Vlasic (11 of 13, 135 yards and a touchdown) saw action in the preseason opener against Dallas, a 28–16 win. The following week, Rod Bernstine rushed 8 times for 94 yards and two touchdowns, and rookie Lewis ran a kickoff back 87 yards for the decisive touchdown in a 30–27 win over the Rams. Tolliver was 10 of 20 for 124 yards, while Vlasic was 12 of 16 for 113 yards and an interception. Their third game saw the Chargers defeat San Francisco, the defending Super Bowl champions, 29–28. While Tolliver finished with solid numbers (10 of 19, 142 yards and a touchdown), Vlasic again boasted a better completion percentage, going 7 of 10 for 78 yards and a touchdown. Miller caught 8 passes for 143 yards and a touchdown.

San Diego missed out on a 4–0 record when they gave up 517 yards and lost 34–7 to the Raiders. Tolliver had his worst performance of the preseason, completing 5 of 16 for 95 yards. Vlasic again put up better numbers: 8 of 14 for 168 yards and a 69-yard touchdown to Miller, who had 7 catches for 158 yards. On September 3, Henning named Vlasic the starter for the regular season opener.

Week	Date	Opponent	Result	Record	Venue	Attendance
1	August 11	Dallas Cowboys	W 28–16	1–0	Jack Murphy Stadium	42,221
2	August 18	at Los Angeles Rams	W 30–27	2–0	Anaheim Stadium	45,684
3	August 25	San Francisco 49ers	W 29–28	3–0	Jack Murphy Stadium	53,917
4	September 1	at Los Angeles Raiders	L 7–34	3–1	Los Angeles Memorial Coliseum	25,017

== Regular season ==
=== Overview ===
San Diego finished 6–10 for the third consecutive season, and missed the playoffs for the eighth consecutive season. They continued to struggle at the quarterback position, trying three different starters, as they did in 1988; Vlasic started the first game, Tolliver the next fourteen, and Friesz the last. Tolliver had the highest passer rating of the trio: 68.9 against a league-wide average of 77.3. He went 6–8 as a starter with 16 touchdowns and 16 interceptions. Miller was again the outstanding wide receiver, though with numbers that fell short of his 1989 totals. He caught 63 passes for 933 yards and seven touchdown; newly signed running back Harmon finished second on the team with 511 receiving yards. The Chargers' team total of 2,683 passing yards ranked 24th of 28 teams in the league. More positively, the offensive line saw Cornish, Courtney Hall, Richards and Broderick Thompson start every game and gave up only 20 sacks, tied for second best in the league.

Aided by the strong offensive line, the running game excelled, with Marion Butts enjoying the best season of his career. Butts set a franchise record with 1,225 yards despite missing two games through injury. He finished third in the league for rushing yards, and first for yards per game with 87.5. With Bernstine adding 589 yards and Harmon a further 363, San Diego finished third in the league in both rushing yardage and yards per carry.

The Chargers defense had another strong campaign, ranking fifth in the league in yards allowed. Linebacker Gary Plummer led the team with 111 tackles, ahead of fellow linebackers Seau and Leslie O'Neal, with 85 and 81 respectively. O'Neal led the team in sacks with 13 1/2, ahead of a pair of defensive ends: Burt Grossman with 10, and Lee Williams, who slipped to 7 1/2 after posting 14 the season before. Nose tackle Les Miller had only a single sack, but recovered three fumbles, including two in the opposing end zone. Gill Byrd had seven interceptions for the third consecutive season, leading the team each time; no other Charger had more than two.

New kicker Reveiz struggled, with only 2 successes from 7 field goal attempts, with none of his attempts coming from 50+ yards. He was replaced after four games by Carney, who made 19 field goals out of 21, his conversion percentage of 90.5% ranking second in the league. Punter Kidd averaged 40 yards per kick, ranking nineteenth. Mid-season acquisition Elder averaged 23.8 yards per kickoff return, second highest in the league.

=== Schedule ===
Week	Date	Opponent	Result	Record	Venue	Attendance	Recap
1	September 9	at Dallas Cowboys	**L** 14–17	0–1	Texas Stadium	48,063	Recap
2	September 16	Cincinnati Bengals	**L** 16–21	0–2	Jack Murphy Stadium	48,098	Recap
3	September 23	at Cleveland Browns	**W** 24–14	1–2	Cleveland Municipal Stadium	77,429	Recap
4	September 30	Houston Oilers	**L** 7–17	1–3	Jack Murphy Stadium	48,762	Recap
5	October 7	at Pittsburgh Steelers	**L** 14–36	1–4	Three Rivers Stadium	53,486	Recap
6	October 14	at New York Jets	**W** 39–3	2–4	Giants Stadium	63,311	Recap
7	October 21	**Los Angeles Raiders**	**L** 9–24	2–5	Jack Murphy Stadium	60,569	Recap
8	October 28	Tampa Bay Buccaneers	**W** 41–10	3–5	Jack Murphy Stadium	40,653	Recap
9	November 4	at **Seattle Seahawks**	**W** 31–14	4–5	Kingdome	59,646	Recap
10	November 11	**Denver Broncos**	**W** 19–7	5–5	Jack Murphy Stadium	59,557	Recap
11	November 18	at **Kansas City Chiefs**	**L** 10–27	5–6	Arrowhead Stadium	63,717	Recap
12	November 25	**Seattle Seahawks**	**L** 10–13 (OT)	5–7	Jack Murphy Stadium	50,097	Recap
13	December 2	New York Jets	**W** 38–17	6–7	Jack Murphy Stadium	40,877	Recap
14	Bye						
15	December 16	at **Denver Broncos**	**L** 10–20	6–8	Mile High Stadium	64,919	Recap
16	December 23	**Kansas City Chiefs**	**L** 21–24	6–9	Jack Murphy Stadium	45,135	Recap
17	December 30	at **Los Angeles Raiders**	**L** 12–17	6–10	Los Angeles Memorial Coliseum	62,593	Recap
Note: Intra-division opponents are in **bold** text.

=== Game summaries ===
==== Week 1: at Dallas Cowboys ====
Week One: San Diego Chargers at Dallas Cowboys – Game summary

Quarter	1	2	3	4	Total
Chargers	7	7	0	0	**14**
Cowboys	7	0	0	10	**17**

at Texas Stadium, Irving, Texas

- Date: September 9
- Game time: 3:00 p.m. CDT
- Game weather: 76 °F (24.4 °C), relative humidity 87%, wind 6 mph
- Game attendance: 48,063
- Referee: Jim Tunney
- TV announcers (NBC): Fred Roggin and Jim Laslavic
- Box score

Game information

**First quarter**

- DAL – Dennis McKinnon 28-yard pass from Troy Aikman (Ken Willis kick), 10:32. Cowboys 7–0. **Drive: 8 plays, 84 yards, 4:28.**
- SDG – Craig McEwen 14-yard pass from Mark Vlasic (Fuad Reveiz kick), 4:30. Tied 7–7. **Drive: 11 plays, 62 yards, 6:02.**

**Second quarter**

- SDG – Marion Butts 1-yard run (Fuad Reveiz kick), 5:43. Chargers 14–7. **Drive: 2 plays, 49 yards, 0:55.**

**Third quarter**

- No scoring plays.

**Fourth quarter**

- DAL – Ken Willis 31-yard field goal, 11:26. Chargers 14–10. **Drive: 8 plays, 36 yards, 4:53.**
- DAL – Troy Aikman 1-yard run (Ken Willis kick), 1:58. Cowboys 17–14. **Drive: 8 plays, 49 yards, 3:17.**

**Top passers**

- SDG – Mark Vlasic – 17/31, 137 yards, TD, INT
- DAL – Troy Aikman – 13/29, 193 yards, TD, INT

**Top rushers**

- SDG – Marion Butts – 16 rushes, 61 yards, TD
- DAL – Tommie Agee – 13 rushes, 59 yards

**Top receivers**

- SDG – Anthony Miller – 4 receptions, 44 yards
- DAL – Kelvin Martin – 5 receptions, 78 yards

A trick play backfired late in the game as San Diego lost their opener by three points. The Cowboys, coming off a 1–15 season, started well, with Troy Aikman leading his offense 84 yards on 8 plays for a touchdown on the first drive of the game. In response, Vlasic converted a 3rd and 16 with a 21-yard completion to Miller, then found Harmon for 15 yards on 3rd and 6. The Chargers reached 3rd and 7 on the Dallas 14, from where Craig McEwen took a short pass on the left and slipped a tackle before cutting back inside and diving in for a touchdown. Vlasic was intercepted on the next Charger possession, and Dallas drove to the San Diego 10 before Aikman threw the ball straight to Billy Ray Smith Jr. for an interception. Later, Miller drew a 41-yard defensive pass interference penalty, and Butts scored from the 1 on the next play. Butts broke off an 18-yard run on the next Charger possession, but Reveiz missed a 31-yard field goal and the score remained 14–7 at halftime.

Lewis lost a fumble on the opening kickoff of the second half, and Dallas took over on the Charger 41. After three plays netted six yards, Aikman threw incomplete on fourth down. Following an exchange of punts, the Chargers reached 4th and 1 from the Dallas 33—they also went for it, and Butts was tripped in the backfield for a loss of two yards. In the 4th quarter, the Cowboys closed the deficit to four points with a field goal, before San Diego reached a 4th and 6 at the Dallas 48 with a little over five minutes remaining. Henning then opted for a fake punt, with the ball snapped directly to Plummer, positioned as an upback on the right. The play didn't go to plan, as Martin Bayless didn't realise that the run was on his side of the field and failed to block Bill Bates, who stopped Plummer for a gain of just two yards. Dallas converted a 4th and 2 on the ensuing drive, and Aikman scored the winning touchdown on a quarterback sneak with 1:58 to play. The Charger offense had generated only two first downs in six second-half drives, so Tolliver was inserted at quarterback for their final drive. He was sacked for a loss of 13 yards on his second play, and eventually threw incomplete on 4th and 20 to confirm the Cowboys' win.

Vlasic finished 17 of 31 for 137 yards, with a touchdown and an interception. It was his final start for the Chargers, with Tolliver taking over in Week 2. Two future Hall of Fame inductees made their debuts in this match. For the Cowboys, Emmitt Smith carried just twice for two yards, while Seau logged 4 solo tackles and 3 assists for the Chargers.

==== Week 2: vs. Cincinnati Bengals ====
Week Two: Cincinnati Bengals at San Diego Chargers – Game summary

Quarter	1	2	3	4	Total
Bengals	0	14	0	7	**21**
Chargers	13	3	0	0	**16**

at Jack Murphy Stadium, San Diego, California

- Date: September 16
- Game time: 1:00 p.m. PDT
- Game weather: 70 °F (21.1 °C), relative humidity 77%, wind 8 mph
- Game attendance: 48,098
- Referee: Red Cashion
- TV announcers (NBC): Dick Enberg and Bill Walsh
- Box score

Game information

**First quarter**

- SDG – Ronnie Harmon 36-yard pass from Billy Joe Tolliver (Fuad Reveiz kick), 12:40. Chargers 7–0. **Drive: 6 plays, 59 yards, 2:20.**
- SDG – Joe Caravello 17-yard pass from Billy Joe Tolliver (kick failed), 5:18. Chargers 13–0. **Drive: 2 plays, 22 yards, 0:48.**

**Second quarter**

- CIN – James Brooks 10-yard pass from Boomer Esiason (Jim Breech kick), 8:03. Chargers 13–7. **Drive: 7 plays, 75 yards, 3:52.**
- SDG – Fuad Reveiz 19-yard field goal, 2:33. Chargers 16–7. **Drive: 6 plays, 45 yards, 3:21.**
- CIN – Eddie Brown 30-yard pass from Boomer Esiason (Jim Breech kick), 1:34. Chargers 16–14. **Drive: 6 plays, 65 yards, 0:59.**

**Third quarter**

- No scoring plays.

**Fourth quarter**

- CIN – Eddie Brown 23-yard pass from Boomer Esiason (Jim Breech kick), 12:08. Bengals 21–16. **Drive: 10 plays, 69 yards, 4:34.**

**Top passers**

- CIN – Boomer Esiason – 20/34, 250 yards, 3 TD, 3 INT
- SDG – Billy Joe Tolliver – 20/38, 284 yards, 2 TD, INT

**Top rushers**

- CIN – James Brooks – 15 rushes, 62 yards
- SDG – Marion Butts – 18 rushes, 103 yards

**Top receivers**

- CIN – Eddie Brown – 10 receptions, 178 yards, 2 TD
- SDG – Anthony Miller – 9 receptions, 137 yards

The Chargers failed to capitalise on an excellent start as they lost their home opener. Six plays into the game, Harmon took a short pass from Tolliver 36 yards for a touchdown. Still in the 1st quarter, Smith intercepted Boomer Esiason and returned the ball 12 yards to the Bengal 22. Tolliver found Joe Caravello for another touchdown two plays later. A penalty on the conversion forced Reveiz to try again from ten yards further out, and he missed wide right to leave the score at 13–0. San Diego looked likely to extend their lead early in the 2nd quarter, but Miller fumbled after making a catch at the Cincinnati 25. The Bengals then drove 75 yards in 7 plays, scoring on a 10-yard pass from Esiason to former Charger James Brooks, who performed a 360° pirouette to pull in a slightly misplaced ball. Vencie Glenn picked off Esiason's next pass near midfield, and a 28-yard sweep by Butts carried the Chargers inside the 10. The drive stalled near the goal line, and San Diego settled for a chip shot field goal from Reveiz. The Bengals responded with a second touchdown pass from Esiason, and when Reveiz missed a 44-yard field goal, it was only 16–14 at halftime.

In the 3rd quarter, Byrd produced San Diego's third interception of the game, picking off a deep pass and returning it to his own 43. The Chargers moved to a 3rd and 5 at the Bengal 8, but a wild throw by Tolliver was intercepted by Lewis Billups at the 2 and returned 29 yards. Cincinnati drove to the Charger 13, before an O'Neal sack pushed them back ten yards. Two plays later, Esiason threw the game-winning touchdown on 3rd and 20, with 12:08 to play. San Diego failed to cross midfield on their final three possessions. On the last, Miller lost his second fumble of the game, after making a catch at his own 45 yard line.

San Diego outgained the Bengals by 417 yards to 302, and both sides committed three turnovers. Butts rushed 18 times for 103 yards, and Miller caught 9 passes for 137 yards.

==== Week 3: at Cleveland Browns ====
Week Three: San Diego Chargers at Cleveland Browns – Game summary

Quarter	1	2	3	4	Total
Chargers	3	7	7	7	**24**
Browns	7	7	0	0	**14**

at Municipal Stadium, Cleveland, Ohio

- Date: September 23
- Game time: 1:00 p.m. EDT
- Game weather: 49 °F (9.4 °C), relative humidity 84%, wind 13 mph
- Game attendance: 77,429
- Referee: Tom Dooley
- TV announcers (NBC): Jim Donovan and Cris Collinsworth
- Box score

Game information

**First quarter**

- SDG – Fuad Reveiz 42-yard field goal, 13:13. Chargers 3–0. **Drive: 4 plays, 3 yards, 0:52.**
- CLE – Mike Johnson 64-yard interception return (Jerry Kauric kick), 9:04. Browns 7–3.

**Second quarter**

- SDG – Anthony Miller 19-yard pass from Billy Joe Tolliver (Fuad Reveiz kick), 6:02. Chargers 10–7. **Drive: 10 plays, 65 yards, 3:56.**
- CLE – Leroy Hoard 1-yard run (Jerry Kauric kick), 1:55. Browns 14–10. **Drive: 8 plays, 90 yards, 4:07.**

**Third quarter**

- SDG – Anthony Miller 23-yard pass from Billy Joe Tolliver (Fuad Reveiz kick), 6:41. Chargers 17–14. **Drive: 7 plays, 84 yards, 3:53.**

**Fourth quarter**

- SDG – Rod Bernstine 1-yard run (Fuad Reveiz kick), 11:24. Chargers 24–14. **Drive: 3 plays, 6 yards, 1:16.**

**Top passers**

- SDG – Billy Joe Tolliver – 12/29, 139 yards, 2 TD, 2 INT
- CLE – Bernie Kosar – 17/36, 232 yards, 3 INT

**Top rushers**

- SDG – Marion Butts – 24 rushes, 90 yards
- CLE – Leroy Hoard – 14 rushes, 34 yards, TD

**Top receivers**

- SDG – Craig McEwen – 6 receptions, 60 yards
- CLE – Eric Metcalf – 6 receptions, 77 yards

Miller scored twice as the Chargers claimed their first win of the season. O'Neal recovered an Eric Metcalf fumble on the third play of the game, setting up a 42-yard field goal by Reveiz. The next time San Diego had the ball, they drove into Cleveland territory before Tolliver threw an interception Mike Johnson returned for a touchdown, putting the Browns ahead 7–3. In the 2nd quarter, Sam Seale intercepted Bernie Kosar; the Browns quarterback was later sacked on consecutive plays, leading to a punt. San Diego then drove 65 yards in 10 plays, scoring when Tolliver found Miller open in the end zone on 3rd and 3 from the 19. Kosar came back with two 30+ yard completions as the Browns drove 90 yards in only 8 plays to retake the lead. San Diego drove as far as the Cleveland 32 in reply, but Tolliver was intercepted again, and the Browns led 14–10 at the break.

Both teams punted to start the second half, before Butts moved the Chargers into Browns territory with a 34-yard burst over right tackle. Tolliver was sacked on the next play, but soon came back with a touchdown on 3rd and 12 from the 23, Miller again getting open in the end zone. Reveiz was short on a field goal attempt from 44 yards out on the next San Diego possession, and the Browns drove as far as the Charger 26 before Williams claimed his second sack of the game. That set up a 3rd and 13, on which Kosar threw straight at Rolling while under heavy pressure. The linebacker intercepted the ball and returned it 69 yards before being caught at the Cleveland 6. Bernstine scored from a yard out three plays later. Cleveland had one more trip into Charger territory, but it was terminated by a fourth-down incompletion. Former CFL cornerback Joe Fuller ended the final Browns drive with another interception.

Tolliver was inconsistent, completing 12 of 29 passes, with two touchdowns and two interceptions. Butts, with 90 yards on 24 carries, led the game in yards from scrimmage. Miller's touchdowns represented his only catches on the day.

==== Week 4: vs. Houston Oilers ====
Week Four: Houston Oilers at San Diego Chargers – Game summary

Quarter	1	2	3	4	Total
Oilers	7	7	0	3	**17**
Chargers	0	7	0	0	**7**

at Jack Murphy Stadium, San Diego, California

- Date: September 30
- Game time: 1:00 p.m. PDT
- Game weather: 70 °F (21.1 °C), relative humidity 77%, wind 9 mph
- Game attendance: 48,762
- Referee: Howard Roe
- TV announcers (NBC): Charlie Jones and Todd Christensen
- Box score

Game information

**First quarter**

- HOU – Drew Hill 9-yard pass from Warren Moon (Tony Zendejas kick), 9:30. Oilers 7–0. **Drive: 17 play, 91 yards, 3:27.**

**Second quarter**

- SDG – Anthony Miller 27-yard pass from Billy Joe Tolliver (Fuad Reveiz kick), 1:46. Tied 7–7. **Drive: 7 plays, 80 yards, 3:59.**
- HOU – Ernest Givins 22-yard pass from Warren Moon (Tony Zendejas kick), 0:29. Oilers 14–7. **Drive: 7 plays, 73 yards, 1:12.**

**Third quarter**

- No scoring plays.

**Fourth quarter**

- HOU – Tony Zendejas 34-yard field goal, 8:06. Oilers 17–7. **Drive: 14 plays, 62 yards, 6:49.**

**Top passers**

- HOU – Warren Moon – 27/46, 355 yards, 2 TD, INT
- SDG – Billy Joe Tolliver – 14/25, 174 yards, TD, 2 INT

**Top rushers**

- HOU – Mike Rozier – 6 rushes, 34 yards
- SDG – Marion Butts – 12 rushes, 75 yards

**Top receivers**

- HOU – Ernest Givins – 6 receptions, 97 yards, TD
- SDG – Anthony Miller – 2 receptions, 41 yards, TD

An error-riddled performance saw the Chargers lose to Houston. The Oilers took the opening kickoff and drove 91 yards for a touchdown in 17 plays, taking more than nine minutes off the clock. San Diego looked to have stopped the drive when Bayless sacked Warren Moon for a loss of 11 yards, and the Oilers' quarterback threw incomplete on the next two plays. Tony Zendejas then missed a 40-yard field goal, but Seau was flagged for jumping to distract the kicker while behind the line of scrimmage, giving Houston a fresh set of downs. Moon found Drew Hill for a touchdown two plays later. Both kickers struggled, with Reveiz wide right from 45 yards out, and Zendejas hitting the upright from 36. On the next Oiler drive, a Moon touchdown pass was overturned on review, and Zendejas missed a 27-yard chip shot field goal.

San Diego then drove 80 yards in seven plays to tie the game, with Tolliver finding Miller in the end zone on 3rd and 7 from the Oiler 27. Only 1:46 remained in the half, but that proved to be enough time for Moon. Passing on every play, he moved the ball from his own 27 to the Charger 27, where he threw incomplete on 3rd and 7. Williams had jumped offside, however, giving Moon another chance; he converted with a touchdown to Ernest Givins on the next play, giving Houston a 14–7 lead 25 seconds before halftime.

Both quarterbacks made errors after the break. The Chargers got as far as the Oiler 46 after taking the second-half kickoff, but Tolliver was intercepted by Cris Dishman on 3rd and 6. Following an exchange of punts, Houston reached a 2nd and 5 at the Charger 7 before being stopped by Byrd's end-zone interception. Tolliver completed a 27-yard pass to Quinn Early on the next play, and picked up another first down with a 14-yard run. San Diego had a 3rd and 8 at the Houston 37 going into the final quarter, but an off-target Tolliver pass was picked off by Bubba McDowell, and the Oilers took nearly seven minutes off the clock while driving for a field goal, and a ten-point lead. Needing a quick response, the Chargers were boosted by Butts, who converted a 3rd and 1 with a 42-yard burst up the middle. The drive stalled near the goal line, and Reveiz was wide left from 27 yards out with three minutes to play, effectively ensuring defeat.

San Diego's defense gave up 421 yards, which would stand as a season high. The missed field goals proved costly for Reveiz, who was released and replaced with Carney before the next game.

==== Week 5: at Pittsburgh Steelers ====
Week Five: San Diego Chargers at Pittsburgh Steelers – Game summary

Quarter	1	2	3	4	Total
Chargers	7	0	7	0	**14**
Steelers	3	14	7	12	**36**

at Three Rivers Stadium, Pittsburgh, Pennsylvania

- Date: October 7
- Game time: 1:00 p.m. EDT
- Game weather: 66 °F (18.9 °C), relative humidity 66%, wind 11 mph
- Game attendance: 53,486
- Referee: Tom White
- TV announcers (NBC): Joel Meyers and Ahmad Rashad
- Box score

Game information

**First quarter**

- PIT – Gary Anderson 45-yard field goal, 8:56. Steelers 3–0. **Drive: 12 plays, 52 yards, 6:04.**
- SDG – Gary Plummer 2-yard pass from Billy Joe Tolliver (Fuad Reveiz kick), 5:00. Chargers 7–3. **Drive: 7 plays, 64 yards, 3:56.**

**Second quarter**

- PIT – Eric Green 8-yard pass from Bubby Brister (Gary Anderson kick), 14:02. Steelers 10–7. **Drive: 9 plays, 77 yards, 5:58.**
- PIT – Eric Green 1-yard pass from Bubby Brister (Gary Anderson kick), 4:39. Steelers 17–7. **Drive: 11 plays, 74 yards, 6:52.**

**Third quarter**

- PIT – Warren Williams 2-yard run (Gary Anderson kick), 11:54. Steelers 24–7. **Drive: 4 plays, 15 yards, 2:24.**
- SDG – Les Miller fumble recovery in end zone (Fuad Reveiz kick), 4:52. Steelers 24–14.

**Fourth quarter**

- PIT – Safety, Dwight Stone blocked punt out of end zone, 11:47. Steelers 26–14.
- PIT – Gary Anderson 45-yard field goal, 7:02. Steelers 29–14. **Drive: 8 plays, 38 yards, 4:45.**
- PIT – Barry Foster 2-yard run (Gary Anderson kick), 1:06. Steelers 36–14. **Drive: 9 plays, 52 yards, 4:52.**

**Top passers**

- SDG – Billy Joe Tolliver – 11/29, 121 yards, TD, 3 INT
- PIT – Bubby Brister – 11/14, 132 yards, 2 TD

**Top rushers**

- SDG – Marion Butts – 9 rushes, 55 yards
- PIT – Merril Hoge – 16 rushes, 78 yards

**Top receivers**

- SDG – Quinn Early – 2 receptions, 51 yards
- PIT – Louis Lipps – 4 receptions, 51 yards

San Diego's offense faded after their first possession in a one-sided defeat. After Pittsburgh opened the scoring with a field goal, Butts had runs of 12 and 15 yards, Early had a 30-yard reception, and San Diego reached a 3rd and goal at the 2. Plummer, a linebacker, then lined up in the offensive backfield and caught a touchdown pass on the only reception of his career. The Steelers responded with touchdown drives of 77 and 74 yards, tight end Eric Green scoring both times for a 17–7 halftime lead.

Tolliver was intercepted on the third play of the second half, leading to another Steelers touchdown. On the next drive, Tolliver converted two third downs before the Chargers attempted a 4th and 12 from the Pittsburgh 27. Tolliver went deep for Anthony Miller; Carnell Lake mistakenly intercepted the pass instead of knocking it down, pinning the Steelers at their own 3. Les Miller recovered a loose ball in the end zone on the next play, pulling the score back to 24–14. The Chargers got no closer; Kidd punted on their next two possessions, and the second of these was blocked through the end zone for a safety. Pittsburgh added a field goal on the ensuing drive, then Tolliver fumbled when sacked by Greg Lloyd and the Steelers scored a further touchdown. Tolliver was intercepted for the third time in the final minute.

Tolliver completed 11 of 29 passes for 121 yards, with a touchdown and 3 interceptions. Pittsburgh scored four offensive touchdowns after managing none in their first four games, and possessed the ball for over 39 minutes.

==== Week 6: at New York Jets ====
Week Six: San Diego Chargers at New York Jets – Game summary

Quarter	1	2	3	4	Total
Chargers	2	20	10	7	**39**
Jets	3	0	0	0	**3**

at Giants Stadium, New York, New York

- Date: October 14
- Game time: 1:00 p.m. EDT
- Game weather: 73 °F (22.8 °C), relative humidity 81%, wind 11 mph
- Game attendance: 63,311
- Referee: Gerry Austin
- TV announcers (NBC): Tom Hammond and Joe Namath
- Box score

Game information

**First quarter**

- SDG – Safety, Burt Grossman sacked Ken O'Brien in end zone, 5:45. Chargers 2–0.
- NYJ – Pat Leahy 22-yard field goal, 4:14. Jets 3–2. **Drive: 4 plays, 9 yards, 0:52.**

**Second quarter**

- SDG – Anthony Miller 29-yard pass from Billy Joe Tolliver (John Carney kick), 13:41. Chargers 9–3. **Drive: 10 plays, 88 yards, 6:03.**
- SDG – Marion Butts 5-yard run (John Carney kick), 9:55. Chargers 16–3. **Drive: 1 play, 5 yards, 0:04.**
- SDG – John Carney 34-yard field goal, 2:00. Chargers 19–3. **Drive: 8 plays, 63 yards, 3:15.**
- SDG – John Carney 42-yard field goal, 0:00. Chargers 22–3. **Drive: 8 plays, 44 yards, 1:30.**

**Third quarter**

- SDG – Marion Butts 6-yard run (John Carney kick), 7:26. Chargers 29–3. **Drive: 12 plays, 89 yards, 7:34.**
- SDG – John Carney 37-yard field goal, 1:51. Chargers 32–3. **Drive: 9 plays, 14 yards, 5:10.**

**Fourth quarter**

- SDG – Rod Bernstine 40-yard run (John Carney kick), 8:42. Chargers 39–3. **Drive: 4 plays, 73 yards, 2:23.**

**Top passers**

- SDG – Billy Joe Tolliver – 12/18, 169 yards, TD
- NYJ – Ken O'Brien – 4/11, 56 yards

**Top rushers**

- SDG – Marion Butts – 25 rushes, 121 yards, 2 TD
- NYJ – Johnny Hector – 11 rushes, 69 yards

**Top receivers**

- SDG – Anthony Miller – 5 receptions, 100 yards, TD
- NYJ – Mark Boyer – 4 receptions, 32 yards

After an error-riddled start, a greatly improved all-around performance saw the Chargers to an easy win. The opening exchanges featured numerous miscues. Jets punter Joe Prokop mishandled a snap on the game's first possession, a teammate eventually recovering 28 yards behind the line of scrimmage. Five plays later, Tolliver also failed to gather a snap cleanly; the loose ball was picked up by New York safety Erik McMillan, but Tolliver then knocked it free and made the recovery himself at the 6. The double turnover gave San Diego a first and goal; they moved the ball to the 1 with a Harmon run, before Butts (twice) and Bernstine were stopped for no gain, and New York took over on downs. Three plays later, Grossman brought Ken O'Brien down in his own end zone for a safety. Darrin Nelson fumbled the ensuing free kick deep inside his own territory, and the Jets converted the opening into a field goal and a 3–2 lead, ten minutes into the game.

San Diego took control from that point, scoring 37 unanswered points. They drove 88 yards in 10 plays on their next possession, with Butts converting a 4th and 1, and Miller catching a 29-yard touchdown on the next play. Soon afterwards, Prokop came under pressure and opted to run rather than punting—he was stopped at his own 5 yard line, and Butts scored on the next play. Carney made his first field goal attempts as a Charger on their next two possessions, and the lead was already 22–3 by halftime. After the interval, Butts capped a 12-play, 89-yard drive with his second touchdown of the game, Carney added a third field goal, and Bernstine broke away on a 40-yard touchdown run to complete the scoring.

Butts rushed 26 times for 121 yards and two touchdowns, as San Diego accumulated 224 yards on the ground. Miller caught 5 passes for 100 yards and a touchdown. The Jets mustered only 53 passing yards, with the Charger defense producing four sacks and a Byrd interception.

==== Week 7: vs. Los Angeles Raiders ====
Week Seven: Los Angeles Raiders at San Diego Chargers – Game summary

Quarter	1	2	3	4	Total
Raiders	0	10	7	7	**24**
Chargers	3	3	3	0	**9**

at Jack Murphy Stadium, San Diego, California

- Date: October 21
- Game time: 1:00 p.m. EDT
- Game weather: 68 °F (20.0 °C), relative humidity 35%, wind 10 mph
- Game attendance: 60,569
- Referee: Jerry Seeman
- TV announcers (NBC): Fred Roggin and Todd Christensen
- Box score

Game information

**First quarter**

- SDG – John Carney 27-yard field goal, 9:17. Chargers 3–0. **Drive: 9 plays, 74 yards, 5:43.**

**Second quarter**

- RAI – Jeff Jaeger 24-yard field goal, 14:08. Tied 3–3. **Drive: 10 plays, 72 yards, 5:06.**
- RAI – Bo Jackson 5-yard run (Jeff Jaeger kick), 8:51. Raiders 10–3. **Drive: 6 plays, 35 yards, 3:37.**
- SDG – John Carney 37-yard field goal, 1:45. Raiders 10–6. **Drive: 13 plays, 70 yards, 7:06.**

**Third quarter**

- RAI – Bo Jackson 7-yard run (Jeff Jaeger kick), 9:56. Raiders 17–6. **Drive: 6 plays, 68 yards, 5:08.**
- SDG – John Carney 37-yard field goal, 3:03. Raiders 17–9. **Drive: 13 plays, 51 yards, 6:49.**

**Fourth quarter**

- RAI – Willie Gault 8-yard pass from Jay Schroeder (Jeff Jaeger kick), 9:30. Raiders 24–9. **Drive: 7 plays, 60 yards, 4:30.**

**Top passers**

- RAI – Jay Schroeder – 11/20, 176 yards, TD, INT
- SDG – Billy Joe Tolliver – 14/28, 169 yards

**Top rushers**

- RAI – Bo Jackson – 12 rushes, 53 yards, 2 TD
- SDG – Marion Butts – 16 rushes, 76 yards

**Top receivers**

- RAI – Willie Gault – 4 receptions, 66 yards, TD
- SDG – Derrick Walker – 3 receptions, 52 yards

An inability to finish drives led the Chargers to slip to 2–5. On the game's opening drive, Butts rushed five times for 36 yards, and San Diego drove 74 yards before settling for Carney's 27-yard field goal. Los Angeles leveled the scores early in the 2nd quarter; Kidd then shanked an 8-yard punt out of bounds at his own 35, setting up a Bo Jackson touchdown run. Tolliver's 23-yard completion was the biggest play on the ensuing drive, which saw San Diego move from their own 10 to the Los Angeles 20 before Carney kicked another field goal, 1:45 before halftime. Seale intercepted Jay Schroeder to set up his offense at the Raider 44, but San Diego scored no points from the opening after Tolliver was sacked, and went into halftime 10–6 down.

Los Angeles drove 68 yards in 8 plays to start the second half, extending their lead with another Jackson touchdown run. The Chargers drove from their own 29 to the Raider 10, but Thompson was flagged for holding and they once again settled for a field goal. Following an exchange of punts, Schroeder threw a touchdown to Willie Gault for the game's final points. San Diego's last two possessions saw them turn the ball over on downs at the Raider 2 yard line (after a 12-play, 68-yard drive), and 34 yard line.

San Diego and Los Angeles had the same offensive yardage total (289). The Chargers were in Raiders territory on six out of nine drives throughout the game. Tolliver completed half his passes (14 of 28), but only 2 of 10 on third down.

==== Week 8: vs. Tampa Bay Buccaneers ====
Week Eight: Tampa Bay Buccaneers at San Diego Chargers – Game summary

Quarter	1	2	3	4	Total
Buccaneers	0	7	3	0	**10**
Chargers	7	17	0	17	**41**

at Jack Murphy Stadium, San Diego, California

- Date: October 28
- Game time: 1:00 p.m. EST
- Game weather: 63 °F (17.2 °C), relative humidity 88%, wind 8 mph
- Game attendance: 40,653
- Referee: Jim Tunney
- TV announcers (CBS): Jim Henderson and Hank Stram
- Box score

Game information

**First quarter**

- SDG – Marion Butts 1-yard run (John Carney kick), 5:12. Chargers 7–0. **Drive: 13 plays, 55 yards, 7:53.**

**Second quarter**

- SDG – Anthony Miller 31-yard pass from Billy Joe Tolliver (John Carney kick), 14:54. Chargers 14–0. **Drive: 5 plays, 56 yards, 2:19.**
- TB – Mark Carrier 68-yard pass from Chris Chandler (Steve Christie kick), 13:18. Chargers 14–7. **Drive: 4 plays, 80 yards, 1:36.**
- SDG – John Carney 28-yard field goal, 6:02. Chargers 17–7. **Drive: 16 plays, 74 yards, 7:16.**
- SDG – Marion Butts 2-yard run (John Carney kick), 0:54. Chargers 24–7. **Drive: 9 plays, 29 yards, 3:34.**

**Third quarter**

- TB – Steve Christie 48-yard field goal, 9:56. Chargers 24–10. **Drive: 9 plays, 27 yards, 3:57.**

**Fourth quarter**

- SDG – Rod Bernstine 20-yard run (John Carney kick), 14:16. Chargers 31–10. **Drive: 3 plays, 33 yards, 0:59.**
- SDG – John Carney 27-yard field goal, 4:31. Chargers 34–10. **Drive: 4 plays, 6 yards, 1:35.**
- SDG – Marion Butts 5-yard run (John Carney kick), 3:28. Chargers 41–10. **Drive: 2 plays, 11 yards, 0:51.**

**Top passers**

- TB – Chris Chandler – 13/26, 148 yards, TD, 4 INT
- SDG – Billy Joe Tolliver – 11/24, 157 yards, TD

**Top rushers**

- TB – Gary Anderson – 10 rushes, 26 yards
- SDG – Rod Bernstine – 15 rushes, 75 yards, TD

**Top receivers**

- TB – Mark Carrier – 1 reception, 68 yards, TD
- SDG – Anthony Miller – 4 receptions, 83 yards, TD

Seven turnovers were the foundation for an easy San Diego victory. The offense, held without a touchdown the week prior, converted three third downs on their opening drive, and Butts opened the scoring from a yard out. Soon afterwards, Byrd intercepted Chris Chandler and returned the ball 24 yards to his own 44. Five plays later, Tolliver found Miller in the end zone for a 31-yard touchdown. Tampa Bay were able to respond with Mark Carrier's 68-yard touchdown reception, but the Chargers reclaimed control on their next two drives. First, they went 74 yards on 16 plays for a field goal, the key play coming when Bernstine converted a 4th and 1 in his own territory. Elder then intercepted Chandler at the Buccaneer 29, and the Chargers converted three third downs, the last of these being Butts' 2-yard touchdown run on 3rd and goal.

Up 24–7 at the break, San Diego went through a lull in the 3rd quarter, the only score being a Tampa Bay field goal after Harmon fumbled. Tampa Bay turned the ball over five times in the second half, however, including four in the final quarter. Aided by these takeaways, as well as a pair of Grossman sacks, the Chargers pulled away with touchdown runs by Bernstine (20 yards) and Butts (5 yards), either side of a Carney field goal.

Byrd had two of San Diego's four interceptions. The Chargers had a balanced offense, gaining 157 yards both running and passing. This was the first time a Chargers team scored 40+ points since 1987, and the last time until 1993.

==== Week 9: at Seattle Seahawks ====
Week Nine: San Diego Chargers at Seattle Seahawks – Game summary

Quarter	1	2	3	4	Total
Chargers	7	7	17	0	**31**
Seahawks	0	7	0	7	**14**

at Seattle Kingdome, Seattle, Washington

- Date: November 4
- Game time: 1:00 p.m. EST
- Game weather: N/A (game played indoors)
- Game attendance: 59,646
- Referee: Red Cashion
- TV announcers (NBC): Tom Hammond and Joe Namath
- Box score

Game information

**First quarter**

- SDG – Ronnie Harmon 11-yard pass from Billy Joe Tolliver (John Carney kick), 9:44. Chargers 7–0. **Drive: 11 plays, 72 yards, 5:16.**

**Second quarter**

- SEA – John L. Williams 21-yard run (Norm Johnson kick), 13:29. Tied 7–7. **Drive: 9 plays, 80 yards, 4:48.**
- SDG – Quinn Early 45-yard pass from Billy Joe Tolliver (John Carney kick), 10:29. Chargers 14–7. **Drive: 5 plays, 61 yards, 3:00.**

**Third quarter**

- SDG – John Carney 20-yard field goal, 6:02. Chargers 17–7. **Drive: 12 plays, 53 yards, 7:20.**
- SDG – Nate Lewis 63-yard punt return (John Carney kick), 0:43. Chargers 24–7.
- SDG – Les Miller fumble recovery in end zone (John Carney kick), 0:11. Chargers 31–7.

**Fourth quarter**

- SEA – Brian Blades 18-yard pass from Dave Krieg (Norm Johnson kick), 4:41. Chargers 31–14. **Drive: 6 plays, 63 yards, 2:24.**

**Top passers**

- SDG – Billy Joe Tolliver – 11/24, 145 yards, 2 TD
- SEA – Dave Krieg – 15/31, 183 yards, TD, INT

**Top rushers**

- SDG – Rod Bernstine – 19 rushes, 61 yards
- SEA – John L. Williams – 6 rushes, 33 yards, TD

**Top receivers**

- SDG – Quinn Early – 3 receptions, 55 yards, TD
- SEA – Tommy Kane – 6 receptions, 97 yards

Their special teams and defense scored touchdowns in quick succession as the Chargers beat Seattle with ease. San Diego took the opening kickoff and drove 72 yards in 11 plays, with Harmon's 11-yard touchdown catch coming on 3rd and 2. Richard Brown recovered a muffed punt later in the opening quarter, but Carney was wide right on a 36-yard field goal—his first miss as a Charger. Seattle then drove 80 yards in 9 plays, and tied the score through a 21-yard John L. Williams run. Five plays later, Tolliver restored San Diego's advantage when he found a streaking Early for a 45-yard touchdown. Neither side crossed midfield in the final ten minutes of the 2nd quarter, and it was 14–7 at halftime.

Nine minutes into the second half, Carney extended the Charger lead to ten points with a 20-yard chip shot field goal, before the game was broken open by two touchdowns in the final minute of the 3rd quarter. First, rookie receiver Lewis fielded a punt and eluded three would-be tacklers en route to a 63-yard touchdown. On the next play from scrimmage, Dave Krieg fumbled under pressure from O'Neal, with Les Miller eventually recovering the loose ball in the end zone for his second touchdown of the season; O'Neal was credited with a 30-yard sack on the play. Seattle scored the only seven points in a processional final quarter.

Tolliver was 11 of 24 for 145 yards and two touchdowns, while throwing no interceptions for the fourth consecutive week. Seattle gained 194 yards, with just 98 of those coming in the first three quarters.

==== Week 10: vs. Denver Broncos ====
Week Ten: Denver Broncos at San Diego Chargers – Game summary

Quarter	1	2	3	4	Total
Broncos	7	0	0	0	**7**
Chargers	0	9	3	7	**19**

at Jack Murphy Stadium, San Diego, California

- Date: November 11
- Game time: 1:00 p.m. EST
- Game weather: 69 °F (20.6 °C), relative humidity 39%, wind 5 mph
- Game attendance: 59,557
- Referee: Johnny Grier
- TV announcers (NBC): Don Criqui and Todd Christensen
- Box score

Game information

**First quarter**

- DEN – Vance Johnson 22-yard pass from John Elway (David Treadwell kick), 3:59. Broncos 7–0. **Drive: 12 plays, 79 yards, 7:00.**

**Second quarter**

- SDG – John Carney 19-yard field goal, 14:09. Broncos 7–3. **Drive: 11 plays, 78 yards, 4:29.**
- SDG – John Carney 23-yard field goal, 4:02. Broncos 7–6. **Drive: 6 plays, 49 yards, 2:37.**
- SDG – John Carney 43-yard field goal, 0:03. Chargers 9–7. **Drive: 12 plays, 46 yards, 2:14.**

**Third quarter**

- SDG – John Carney 32-yard field goal, 3:11. Chargers 12–7. **Drive: 5 plays, 12 yards, 2:35.**

**Fourth quarter**

- SDG – Gary Plummer 1-yard run (John Carney kick), 8:59. Chargers 19–7. **Drive: 10 plays, 80 yards, 6:39.**

**Top passers**

- DEN – John Elway – 17/30, 171 yards, TD, 2 INT
- SDG – Billy Joe Tolliver – 16/27, 172 yards

**Top rushers**

- DEN – Bobby Humphrey – 22 rushes, 62 yards
- SDG – Marion Butts – 16 rushes, 114 yards

**Top receivers**

- DEN – Mike Young – 3 receptions, 45 yards
- SDG – Craig McEwen – 3 receptions, 41 yards
  SDG – Anthony Miller – 3 receptions, 41 yards

Byrd intercepted John Elway on consecutive drives, and San Diego evened their record at 5–5 with a third consecutive win. Denver started well, forcing a punt and driving 79 yards for the opening touchdown. The Chargers appeared poised to respond in kind when Walker took a short pass for 23 yards and brought up a 1st and goal at the 4, but the drive stalled and Carney kicked a short field goal early in the 2nd quarter. Later in the quarter, Butts swept for 45 yards around left end, and appeared to have scored from the 1 three plays later; Arthur Cox, however, was flagged for illegal motion, negating the touchdown and eventually leading to another chip-shot field goal. With 2:17 to play, San Diego began a drive on their own 29. Tolliver converted three third downs, including a 28-yard completion to McEwen on 3rd and 27, and Carney's 43-yard kick made it 9–7, three seconds before half time.

Nine minutes into the second half, Byrd intercepted Elway at the Denver 31. San Diego soon drove inside the Bronco 10 for the third time in the game, but Walker was flagged for holding and Carney came in to kick his fourth field goal. A 75-yard kickoff return had Denver threatening to retake the lead, but Byrd again picked off Elway, this time in the end zone. San Diego then drove 80 yards in 10 plays, with Butts breaking off a 22-yard run, and Miller producing back-to-back receptions of 18 and 14 yards. This time, they found the end zone, with Plummer scoring off right tackle from a yard out for his second offensive touchdown of the season. Needing two touchdowns with 8:59 on the clock, Denver embarked on an 18-play drive that featured two fourth-down conversions and took over six minutes off the clock. They reached a 1st and goal at the 1, but their next two plays combined to lose a yard, before Williams sacked Elway at the 11 and Glenn knocked away his final pass to clinch the win.

Butts rushed 16 times for 114 yards, and Tolliver ran his streak of games without an interception to five. The Chargers moved within half a game of the AFC playoff places; one of the three wildcard spots was held by their next opponents, the 5–4 Chiefs.

==== Week 11: at Kansas City Chiefs ====
Week Eleven: San Diego Chargers at Kansas City Chiefs – Game summary

Quarter	1	2	3	4	Total
Chargers	3	0	7	0	**10**
Chiefs	10	7	3	7	**27**

at Arrowhead Stadium, Kansas City, Missouri

- Date: November 18
- Game time: 12:00 p.m. CST
- Game weather: 49 °F (9.4 °C), relative humidity 54%, wind 11 mph
- Game attendance: 63,717
- Referee: Dick Hantak
- TV announcers (NBC): Charlie Jones and Todd Christensen
- Box score

Game information

**First quarter**

- KAN – J. J. Birden 90-yard pass from Steve DeBerg (Nick Lowery kick), 13:11. Chiefs 7–0. **Drive: 3 plays, 92 yards, 1:49.**
- KAN – Nick Lowery 36-yard field goal, 10:53. Chiefs 10–0. **Drive: 4 plays, -4 yards, 2:04.**
- SDG – John Carney 42-yard field goal, 3:38. Chiefs 10–3. **Drive: 11 plays, 50 yards, 7:15.**

**Second quarter**

- KAN – Bill Jones 2-yard pass from Steve DeBerg (Nick Lowery kick), 7:44. Chiefs 17–3. **Drive: 12 plays, 78 yards, 6:15.**

**Third quarter**

- SDG – Derrick Walker 2-yard pass from Billy Joe Tolliver (John Carney kick), 8:43. Chiefs 17–10. **Drive: 12 plays, 80 yards, 6:17.**
- KAN – Nick Lowery 37-yard field goal, 2:11. Chiefs 20–10. **Drive: 7 plays, 39 yards, 2:56.**

**Fourth quarter**

- KAN – Bill Jones 6-yard pass from Steve DeBerg (Nick Lowery kick), 10:28. Chiefs 27–10. **Drive: 4 plays, 30 yards, 0:02.**

**Top passers**

- SDG – Billy Joe Tolliver – 21/38, 203 yards, TD, 2 INT
- KAN – Steve DeBerg – 11/24, 171 yards, 3 TD

**Top rushers**

- SDG – Ronnie Harmon – 5 rushes, 41 yards
- KAN – Barry Word – 17 rushes, 90 yards

**Top receivers**

- SDG – Anthony Miller – 6 receptions, 93 yards
- KAN – J. J. Birden – 1 reception, 90 yards

San Diego's quarterbacks turned the ball over five times as their playoff chances suffered a major setback. Kansas City went ahead only three plays into the game when Steve DeBerg found J.J. Birden behind Elder and Seale for a 90-yard touchdown pass. On the Chargers' first play from scrimmage, Tolliver fumbled the snap and Kanas City recovered, setting up a Nick Lowery field goal and a 10–0 lead barely four minutes into the game. San Diego managed a Carney field goal in response, but the Chiefs drove 78 yards in the 2nd quarter and doubled their lead through DeBerg's second touchdown pass. Shortly before halftime, Vlasic entered the game for one series and was intercepted in his own territory. The Chiefs looked set to extend their lead, but missed out on the chance to kick a field goal when the clock expired due to a misunderstanding as to whether a timeout had been called.

The Chargers got back into the game on the opening possession of the second half. Miller caught two passes for 40 yards on a 10-play, 80-yard drive that ended with Tolliver finding Walker from two yards out for a touchdown. The Charger defense then forced a punt, but Tolliver was intercepted two plays later, setting up another Lowery field goal. DeBerg later threw his third touchdown pass of the game, and the Charger's last two possessions ended with Tolliver fumbling and being intercepted.

Miller had 6 catches for 93 yards. San Diego were only outgained by 11 yards (297–286), but committed all five of the game's turnovers.

==== Week 12: vs. Seattle Seahawks ====
Week Twelve: Seattle Seahawks at San Diego Chargers – Game summary

Quarter	1	2	3	4	OT	Total
Seahawks	0	3	0	7	3	**13**
Chargers	0	3	7	0	0	**10**

at Jack Murphy Stadium, San Diego, California

- Date: November 25
- Game time: 5:00 p.m. EST
- Game weather: 61 °F (16.1 °C), relative humidity 76%, wind 5 mph
- Game attendance: 50,097
- Referee: Dale Hamer
- TV announcers (ESPN): Mike Patrick and Joe Theismann
- Box score

Game information

**First quarter**

- No scoring plays.

**Second quarter**

- SDG – John Carney 20-yard field goal, 2:56. Chargers 3–0. **Drive: 14 plays, 90 yards, 9:00.**
- SEA – Norm Johnson 26-yard field goal, 0:05. Tied 3–3. **Drive: 6 plays, 39 yards, 0:40.**

**Third quarter**

- SDG – Arthur Cox 8-yard pass from Billy Joe Tolliver (John Carney kick), 5:43. Chargers 10–3. **Drive: 10 plays, 82 yards, 5:43.**

**Fourth quarter**

- SEA – Derrick Fenner 1-yard run (Norm Johnson kick), 4:17. Tied 10–10. **Drive: 10 plays, 40 yards, 5:47.**

**Overtime**

- SEA – Norm Johnson 40-yard field goal, 11:59. Seahawks 13–10. **Drive: 3 plays, 1 yard, 1:27.**

**Top passers**

- SEA – Dave Krieg – 18/26, 211 yards
- SDG – Billy Joe Tolliver – 15/22, 145 yards, TD, 2 INT

**Top rushers**

- SEA – John L. Williams – 10 rushes, 27 yards
- SDG – Marion Butts – 28 rushes, 128 yards

**Top receivers**

- SEA – John L. Williams – 9 receptions, 110 yards
- SDG – Arthur Cox – 6 receptions, 53 yards, TD

San Diego had five turnovers for the second consecutive game, including three on their final three possessions as they lost in overtime. In a scoreless 1st quarter, Seattle kicker Norm Johnson missed a 36-yard field goal and a deep ball from Tolliver was intercepted. In the 2nd quarter, Lee Williams sacked Dave Krieg with the Seahawks in San Diego territory, forcing a punt that pinned the Chargers at their own 8. Butts rushed 8 times for 48 yards on the ensuing drive, which took San Diego within a yard of the Seattle end zone. They were pushed back 15 yards when Cox was flagged for spitting at an opponent, and had to settle for a field goal. A minute before halftime, Kidd punted for the Chargers, and Chris Warren fumbled during the return. The loose ball went straight to Kidd, who briefly had possession before he too fumbled, and Seattle recovered at the San Diego 47. They drove inside the 10, and kicked a field goal one play after Frank was ruled not to have taken a low interception attempt cleanly.

After an exchange of punts to begin the second half, San Diego drove 82 yards on 10 plays to take the lead. Butts again contributed heavily, rushing 5 times for 39 yards, and Cox dived to pull in an 8-yard touchdown pass on 3rd and 6. John L. Williams took a screen pass 60 yards on the next drive, breaking several tackles before Seale chased him down at the San Diego 26 to save a touchdown. One play later, Lee Williams forced Krieg to fumble, and Les Miller recovered. San Diego still led 10–3 with a little over ten minutes remaining in regulation, with a 2nd and 9 at the Seattle 49, but Tolliver threw an interception straight to Eugene Robinson. Seattle converted three third downs on the ensuing drive, and tied the scores with 4:17 to play. Tolliver and Anthony Miller connected twice on third-down conversions as San Diego looked to position themselves for a game-winning field goal. With a little under a minute to play, Cox made a catch that would have given his team a first down at the Seattle 21, but he fumbled, the Seahawks recovered, and the game went to overtime. San Diego won the toss and opted to receive in the extra period, but Cox fumbled again on their third play, setting up Seattle at the Charger 23. After two further plays, Seattle sent in Johnson, who won the game with a 40-yard field goal.

It was the first time a Chargers game had gone to overtime since 1987. Butts rushed 28 times for 128 yards. Krieg was sacked four times and was responsible for five fumbles. Seattle fumbled six times in total, but the Chargers recovered only two of them.

==== Week 13: vs. New York Jets ====
Week Thirteen: New York Jets at San Diego Chargers – Game summary

Quarter	1	2	3	4	Total
Jets	3	7	0	7	**17**
Chargers	7	10	7	14	**38**

at Jack Murphy Stadium, San Diego, California

- Date: December 2
- Game time: 1:00 p.m. EST
- Game weather: 58 °F (14.4 °C), relative humidity 57%, wind 7 mph
- Game attendance: 40,877
- Referee: Pat Haggerty
- TV announcers (NBC): Tom Hammond and Joe Namath
- Box score

Game information

**First quarter**

- NYJ – Pat Leahy 38-yard field goal, 10:51. Jets 3–0. **Drive: 9 plays, 43 yards, 4:09.**
- SDG – Marion Butts 1-yard run (John Carney kick), 3:53. Chargers 7–3. **Drive: 4 plays, 13 yards, 2:01.**

**Second quarter**

- SDG – Marion Butts 4-yard run (John Carney kick), 11:57. Chargers 14–3. **Drive: 6 plays, 53 yards, 3:23.**
- NYJ – Al Toon 21-yard pass from Ken O'Brien (Pat Leahy kick), 6:38. Chargers 14–10. **Drive: 9 plays, 84 yards, 5:19.**
- SDG – John Carney 22-yard field goal, 0:03. Chargers 17–10. **Drive: 10 plays, 77 yards, 2:28.**

**Third quarter**

- SDG – Anthony Miller 24-yard pass from Billy Joe Tolliver (John Carney kick), 5:59. Chargers 24–10. **Drive: 8 plays, 50 yards, 4:27.**

**Fourth quarter**

- NYJ – Al Toon 8-yard pass from Ken O'Brien (Pat Leahy kick), 14:49. Chargers 24–17. **Drive: 14 plays, 78 yards, 6:02.**
- SDG – Nate Lewis 19-yard pass from Billy Joe Tolliver (John Carney kick), 11:13. Chargers 31–17. **Drive: 6 plays, 84 yards, 3:36.**
- SDG – Nate Lewis 10-yard run (John Carney kick), 2:04. Chargers 38–17. **Drive: 6 plays, 80 yards, 2:29.**

**Top passers**

- NYJ – Ken O'Brien – 19/37, 217 yards, 2 TD, 2 INT
- SDG – Billy Joe Tolliver – 14/27, 220 yards, 2 TD, INT

**Top rushers**

- NYJ – Freeman McNeil – 13 rushes, 69 yards
- SDG – Marion Butts – 26 rushes, 159 yards, 2 TD

**Top receivers**

- NYJ – Al Toon – 6 receptions, 61 yards, 2 TD
- SDG – Nate Lewis – 4 receptions, 89 yards, TD

Butts made several big plays as San Diego completed a two-game season sweep of the Jets. The Chargers were trailing 3–0 in the opening quarter when Elder knocked back a Kidd punt for Lester Lyles to down at the New York 1. Three plays later, Frank intercepted Ken O'Brien, setting up his offense at the 13—Butts soon scored from a yard out. On the next Jets' possession, Smith forced a fumble that Bayless recovered at the Charger 47. Lewis opened the ensuing drive with a 25-yard reception, and Butts added a 14-yard run before scoring from the 4. O'Brien responded by leading an 86-yard drive and finding Al Toon for a touchdown. Tolliver was intercepted in his own territory late in the half, but the defense held and New York missed a field goal. Butts had a 26-yard catch-and-run on the next play, and McEwen's 32-yard reception took the ball to the New York 5 before San Diego settled for a field goal and a 17–10 lead at the break.

Tolliver found Miller for a 24-yard touchdown in the 3rd quarter, before O'Brien and Toon combined on their second touchdown pass of the game. San Diego's response covered 84 yards in only 6 plays. Butts had runs of 13 and 18 yards either side of a 40-yard reception by Lewis to move San Diego into the red zone; two plays later, Butts had a touchdown negated after Hall was flagged for holding, but Lewis made a fingertip catch for a 19-yard touchdown on the next snap. Following an exchange of punts, New York converted a fourth down and reached 2nd and 7 at the Charger 8 with under five minutes to play. Frank then tipped a pass in the end zone, and Bayless intercepted to end the Jets' last serious threat. Butts broke through an opening at right tackle and gained 52 yards before he was brought down; Lewis ensured the win with a 10-yard end-around two plays later.

Butts finished with 26 carries for 159 yards and two touchdowns; adding in his 26-yard reception, he had a career-high 185 offensive yards. Lewis had 4 catches for 89 yards and a touchdown, while adding 2 carries for 15 yards and a touchdown.

==== Week 15: at Denver Broncos ====
Week Fifteen: San Diego Chargers at Denver Broncos – Game summary

Quarter	1	2	3	4	Total
Chargers	0	3	0	7	**10**
Broncos	0	7	7	6	**20**

at Mile High Stadium, Denver, Colorado

- Date: December 16
- Game time: 2:00 p.m. MST
- Game weather: 32 °F (0.0 °C), relative humidity 38%, wind 5 mph, wind chill 28
- Game attendance: 64,919
- Referee: Bob McElwee
- TV announcers (NBC): Jim Donovan and Jim Laslavic
- Box score

Game information

**First quarter**

- No scoring plays.

**Second quarter**

- SDG – John Carney 30-yard field goal, 0:56. Chargers 3–0. **Drive: 15 plays, 58 yards, 5:59.**
- DEN – Mike Young 25-yard pass from John Elway (David Treadwell kick), 0:15. Broncos 7–3. **Drive: 5 plays, 65 yards, 0:41.**

**Third quarter**

- DEN – Mike Young 3-yard pass from John Elway (David Treadwell kick), 7:49. Broncos 14–3. **Drive: 9 plays, 57 yards, 5:23.**

**Fourth quarter**

- DEN – David Treadwell 49-yard field goal, 12:58. Broncos 17–3. **Drive: 9 plays, 36 yards, 2:56.**
- SDG – Craig McEwen 22-yard pass from Billy Joe Tolliver (John Carney kick), 10:52. Broncos 17–10. **Drive: 7 plays, 80 yards, 2:06.**
- DEN – David Treadwell 26-yard field goal, 7:37. Broncos 20–10. **Drive: 5 plays, 71 yards, 3:15.**

**Top passers**

- SDG – Billy Joe Tolliver – 26/51, 308 yards, TD, INT
- DEN – John Elway – 18/29, 248 yards, 2 TD

**Top rushers**

- SDG – Marion Butts – 22 rushes, 71 yards
- DEN – Bobby Humphrey – 15 rushes, 51 yards

**Top receivers**

- SDG – Ronnie Harmon – 8 receptions, 116 yards
- DEN – Mel Bratton – 3 receptions, 78 yards

San Diego were officially eliminated from playoff contention after a late comeback attempt fell short. The Chargers narrowly missed a touchdown on their opening drive: Harmon's 30-yard catch took the ball inside the Denver 10, but Walker fumbled while trying to stretch the ball over the goal line on third down, and the Broncos recovered. The Chargers reached Denver's 37-yard line in the 2nd quarter, but Butts was stopped a yard short when they went for it on 4th and 2. Denver, who had gone three-and-out on their first three possessions, finally drove in range for a field goal; David Treadwell's 46-yard kick was deflected by Grossman, however, and fell well short. Butts converted two third downs with rushes on the next drive, and Harmon converted another with a 20-yard catch; Carney's 30-yard field goal opened the scoring with 56 seconds to play in the half. Elway, however, needed only 41 seconds to drive 65 yards for a touchdown, completing two 25-yard passes, the latter a touchdown for Michael Young.

Denver stretched their lead in the second half, with Young scoring a second touchdown and Treadwell kicking a 49-yard field goal for a 17–3 lead with 12:58 to play in the game. Tolliver passed on every play on the next drive, completing 5 of 7 and converting a fourth down a play before finding McEwen at the goal line for a 22-yard touchdown. Melvin Bratton took a short pass for 63 yards on the next play from scrimmage, setting up another field goal. Needing two scores again, San Diego advanced to a 2nd and 4 at the Denver 18, but Tolliver badly overthrew Miller and was intercepted with five minutes to play. San Diego's final possession ended when Tolliver threw incomplete on fourth down at the Denver 38 yard line.

Tolliver completed 26 of 51 passes for 308 yards, with one touchdown and one interception. Harmon caught 8 passes for a regular season career-best 116 yards; he also rushed 3 times for 17 yards.

==== Week 16: vs. Kansas City Chiefs ====
Week Sixteen: Kansas City Chiefs at San Diego Chargers – Game summary

Quarter	1	2	3	4	Total
Chiefs	7	14	0	3	**24**
Chargers	7	0	7	7	**21**

at Jack Murphy Stadium, San Diego, California

- Date: December 23
- Game time: 1:00 p.m. EST
- Game weather: 45 °F (7.2 °C), relative humidity 35%, wind 7 mph
- Game attendance: 45,135
- Referee: Jerry Seeman
- TV announcers (NBC): Charlie Jones and Todd Christensen
- Box score

Game information

**First quarter**

- KAN – Stephone Paige 8-yard pass from Steve DeBerg (Nick Lowery kick), 8:54. Chiefs 7–0. **Drive: 9 plays, 64 yards, 5:58.**
- SDG – Anthony Miller 5-yard pass from Billy Joe Tolliver (John Carney kick), 1:37. Tied 7–7. **Drive: 12 plays, 71 yards, 7:17.**

**Second quarter**

- KAN – Barry Word 11-yard run (Nick Lowery kick), 11:12. Chiefs 14–7. **Drive: 9 plays, 77 yards, 5:25.**
- KAN – Todd McNair 40-yard pass from Steve DeBerg (Nick Lowery kick), 1:08. Chiefs 21–7. **Drive: 9 plays, 78 yards, 4:53.**

**Third quarter**

- SDG – Rod Bernstine 3-yard run (John Carney kick), 8:52. Chiefs 21–14. **Drive: 11 plays, 66 yards, 6:08.**

**Fourth quarter**

- SDG – Kitrick Taylor 55-yard punt return (John Carney kick), 14:39. Tied 21–21.
- KAN – Nick Lowery 32-yard field goal, 2:46. Chiefs 24–21. **Drive: 9 plays, 85 yards, 5:05.**

**Top passers**

- KAN – Steve DeBerg – 19/27, 251 yards, 2 TD
- SDG – Billy Joe Tolliver – 18/27, 165 yards, TD, 2 INT

**Top rushers**

- KAN – Barry Word – 28 rushes, 106 yards, TD
- SDG – Rod Bernstine – 15 rushes, 76 yards, TD

**Top receivers**

- KAN – Todd McNair – 3 receptions, 111 yards, TD
- SDG – Ronnie Harmon – 7 receptions, 72 yards

San Diego overcame a fourteen-point deficit, but still lost to the playoff-chasing Chiefs. Kansas City's offense scored touchdowns on three of their four first-half possessions, including a 9-play, 64-yard drive to open the game. The Chargers responded with a long touchdown drive of their own: Tolliver converted one third down with a pass to Harmon, and another with a run, before finding Miller for a 5-yard touchdown on 3rd and 4. Kansas City, rounded off 77- and 78- yard drives with 2nd quarter touchdowns, however, with Tolliver throwing an interception deep in Chiefs territory between the two scores.

Down 21–7, the Chargers improved markedly after the break. On the opening possession of the second half, Bernstine (seeing increased playing time because Butts was injured) carried 6 times for 23 yards, finishing the drive by leaping over the goal line from 3 yards out. San Diego were forced to punt on their next possession, but Plummer downed Kidd's kick at the Chiefs 3. Kansas City went three-and-out, and Taylor fielded the resulting punt at his own 45 before sidestepping two defenders and threading his way up the center of the field for the game-tying touchdown. Kidd's next punt was even better, with Sammy Lilly downing it a yard from the Kansas City goal line with 7:51 to play. Two plays gained four yards, before Todd McNair took a short pass, broke Rolling's tackle at the 10, and gained 65 yards before being brought down at the Charger 30. Nick Lowery kicked the game-winning field goal shortly afterwards. The Chargers still had over two minutes to reply, and advanced to a 2nd and 1 at their own 48 before Tolliver's overthrown pass went directly to Deron Cherry for an interception, and the Chiefs ran out the clock.

Harmon had 5 carries for 25 yards and 7 catches for 72 yards. Tolliver was 18 of 27 for 165 yards, with a touchdown and two interceptions. This proved to be his final game as a Charger, as he was benched for Friesz in the finale, and traded to Atlanta in the offseason.

==== Week 17: at Los Angeles Raiders ====
Week Seventeen: San Diego Chargers at Los Angeles Raiders – Game summary

Quarter	1	2	3	4	Total
Chargers	3	6	0	3	**12**
Raiders	0	7	0	10	**17**

at Memorial Coliseum, Los Angeles, California

- Date: December 30
- Game time: 1:00 p.m. EST
- Game weather: 53 °F (11.7 °C), relative humidity 42%, wind 5 mph
- Game attendance: 62,593
- Referee: Jerry Markbreit
- TV announcers (NBC): Charlie Jones and Todd Christensen
- Box score

Game information

**First quarter**

- SDG – John Carney 19-yard field goal, 8:53. Chargers 3–0. **Drive: 11 plays, 79 yards, 6:07.**

**Second quarter**

- RAI – Marcus Allen 1-yard run (Jeff Jaeger kick), 10:59. Raiders 7–3. **Drive: 10 plays, 76 yards, 5:59.**
- SDG – Craig McEwen 7-yard pass from John Friesz (kick blocked), 1:55. Chargers 9–7. **Drive: 9 plays, 34 yards, 5:07.**

**Third quarter**

- No scoring plays.

**Fourth quarter**

- RAI – Jeff Jaeger 45-yard field goal, 13:33. Raiders 10–9. **Drive: 3 plays, 36 yards, 3:15.**
- SDG – John Carney 21-yard field goal, 11:36. Chargers 12–10. **Drive: 4 plays, 4 yards, 1:57.**
- RAI – Steve Smith 17-yard pass from Jay Schroeder (Jeff Jaeger kick), 3:53. Raiders 17–12. **Drive: 11 plays, 80 yards, 7:43.**

**Top passers**

- SDG – John Friesz – 11/22, 98 yards, TD, INT
- RAI – Jay Schroeder – 11/22, 162 yards, TD

**Top rushers**

- SDG – Rod Bernstine – 27 rushes, 114 yards
- RAI – Steve Smith – 7 rushes, 38 yards

**Top receivers**

- SDG – Anthony Miller – 2 receptions, 23 yards
- RAI – Mervyn Fernandez – 3 receptions, 37 yards

Friesz made his first NFL start, as Beathard wanted to give the rookie quarterback a chance to compete for the starting job. His debut ended in defeat to a Raiders side playing to clinch both the AFC West title and a playoff bye. Friesz attempted only two passes on the game's 11-play opening drive, which saw Harmon start to the left and reverse field to the right on a 41-yard run to the Raider 10. When Harmon was stopped a yard short of the end zone on third down, Carney opened the scoring with a 19-yard chip-shot field goal. The Chargers gained a first down at the Raider 35 on their next drive, but Friesz was intercepted, and Los Angeles drove 76 yards the other way, scoring on a Marcus Allen touchdown. Later, Taylor's 33-yard punt return set up his offense at the Raider 34; Bernstine converted a 4th and 1, before Friesz found McEwen from 7 yards out for his first ever touchdown pass. Carney's extra point was blocked, and San Diego led 9–7 at halftime.

In a scoreless 3rd quarter, Gerald Robinson stuffed Marcus Allen on a fourth-down try, and Carney was short on a 54-yard field goal. After the Raiders edged ahead with a field goal early in the final period, Elder returned a kickoff for 90 yards to the Los Angeles 7 yard line, but the Chargers had to settle for another Carney field goal. The Raiders then drove 80 yards in 11 plays, scoring the winning touchdown with 3:53 to play. San Diego began their final drive at their own 20. After gaining 9 yards in three plays, Bernstine converted on 4th and 1 with a 14-yard gain up the middle. Friesz also converted a 3rd and 15 with a 16-yard completion to Miller, but eventually threw incomplete on 4th and 11 from the Raider 47, with 45 seconds to play.

Friesz was 11 of 22 for 98 yards, with a touchdown and an interception. Bernstine rushed 27 times for 114 yards, the first 100-yard game of his career. The Chargers finished 6–10 for the third consecutive season; despite the closeness of this game, they were six clear games back of the division-winning Raiders (12–4).

=== Standings ===
AFC West
	W	L	T	PCT	DIV	CONF	PF	PA	STK
^{(2)} Los Angeles Raiders	12	4	0	.750	6–2	9–3	337	268	W5
^{(5)} Kansas City Chiefs	11	5	0	.688	5–3	7–5	369	257	W2
Seattle Seahawks	9	7	0	.563	4–4	7–5	306	286	W2
San Diego Chargers	6	10	0	.375	2–6	5–9	315	281	L3
Denver Broncos	5	11	0	.313	3–5	4–8	331	374	W1

== Awards ==
Three Chargers were named to the 1991 Pro Bowl, with Butts also named a 2nd-team All-Pro by the Associated Press. Also, Seau received a single vote as Defensive Rookie of the Year.

Player	Position	Pro Bowl starter	Pro Bowl reserve	AP 2nd team All-Pro	NEA 2nd team All-Pro
Marion Butts	Running back		Yes	Yes	Yes
Gill Byrd	Cornerback				Yes
Anthony Miller	Wide receiver	Yes			
Leslie O'Neal	Linebacker	Yes			
