= 1989 North Texas Mean Green football team =

American college football season

1989 North Texas Mean Green football
- Conference: Southland Conference
- Record: 5–6 (2–4 Southland)
- Head coach: Corky Nelson (8th season)
- Home stadium: Fouts Field

1989 Southland Conference football standings
	Conf.					Overall
Team	W		L		T	W		L		T
No. 3 Stephen F. Austin $^	5	–	0	–	1	12	–	2	–	1
Northwestern State	3	–	1	–	2	4	–	5	–	2
SW Texas State	3	–	3	–	0	5	–	6	–	0
Northeast Louisiana	2	–	3	–	1	4	–	6	–	1
McNeese State	2	–	4	–	0	5	–	6	–	0
North Texas	2	–	4	–	0	5	–	6	–	0
Sam Houston State	2	–	4	–	0	3	–	8	–	0
$ – Conference champion; ^ – NCAA Division I-AA playoff participant; Rankings from NCAA Division I-AA Football Committee poll

The 1989 North Texas Mean Green football team was an American football team that represented the University of North Texas during the 1989 NCAA Division I-AA football season as a member of the Southland Conference. In their eighth year under head coach Corky Nelson, the team compiled a 5–6 record.

== Schedule ==
Date	Opponent	Rank	Site	Result	Attendance	Source
September 9	Abilene Christian*	No. 3	Fouts Field; Denton, TX	W 35–19	17,859	
September 16	Murray State*	No. 3	Fouts Field; Denton, TX	W 28–14	18,059	
September 23	at No. 8 Arkansas State*	No. 2	Indian Stadium; Jonesboro, AR	W 20–17		
September 30	at Kansas State*	No. 1т	KSU Stadium; Manhattan, KS	L 17–20	26,564	
October 7	at Northwestern State	No. 4т	Harry Turpin Stadium; Natchitoches, LA	L 7–30	11,500	
October 14	No. 10 Stephen F. Austin^{†}	No. 16	Fouts Field; Denton, TX	L 16–35	20,252	
October 21	Sam Houston State		Fouts Field; Denton, TX	L 6–14	9,127	
October 28	at SMU*		Ownby Stadium; University Park, TX (rivalry)	L 9–35	21,186	
November 4	at McNeese State		Cowboy Stadium; Lake Charles, LA	W 31–19		
November 11	Southwest Texas State		Fouts Field; Denton, TX	L 20–25		
November 18	at Northeast Louisiana		Malone Stadium; Monroe, LA	W 28–25		
*Non-conference game; ^{†}Homecoming; Rankings from NCAA Division I-AA Football Committee Poll released prior to the game
