= 1989 Northwestern State Demons football team =

American college football season

1989 Northwestern State Demons football
- Conference: Southland Conference
- Record: 4–5–2 (3–1–2 Southland)
- Head coach: Sam Goodwin (7th season)
- Defensive coordinator: John Thompson (2nd in stint; 6th overall season)
- Home stadium: Harry Turpin Stadium

1989 Southland Conference football standings
	Conf.					Overall
Team	W		L		T	W		L		T
No. 3 Stephen F. Austin $^	5	–	0	–	1	12	–	2	–	1
Northwestern State	3	–	1	–	2	4	–	5	–	2
SW Texas State	3	–	3	–	0	5	–	6	–	0
Northeast Louisiana	2	–	3	–	1	4	–	6	–	1
McNeese State	2	–	4	–	0	5	–	6	–	0
North Texas	2	–	4	–	0	5	–	6	–	0
Sam Houston State	2	–	4	–	0	3	–	8	–	0
$ – Conference champion; ^ – NCAA Division I-AA playoff participant; Rankings from NCAA Division I-AA Football Committee poll

The 1989 Northwestern State Demons football team was an American football team that represented Northwestern State University as a member of the Southland Conference during the 1989 NCAA Division I-AA football season. In their seventh year under head coach Sam Goodwin, the team compiled an overall record of 4–5–2, with a mark of 3–1–2 in conference play, and finished second in the Southland.

== Schedule ==
Date	Opponent	Rank	Site	Result	Attendance	Source
September 2	at Southwest Missouri State*		Briggs Stadium; Springfield, MO	L 10–20		
September 9	at Eastern Illinois*		O'Brien Stadium; Charleston, IL	L 10–20	5,103	
September 16	No. 20 (D-II) East Texas State*		Harry Turpin Stadium; Natchitoches, LA	W 38–14	11,400	
September 23	McNeese State		Harry Turpin Stadium; Natchitoches, LA (rivalry)	W 15–14		
September 30	at Southwest Texas State		Bobcat Stadium; San Marcos, TX	W 31–14	8,146	
October 7	No. T–4 North Texas		Harry Turpin Stadium; Natchitoches, LA	W 30–7	11,500	
October 21	vs. Northeast Louisiana	No. 10	Independence Stadium; Shreveport, LA (rivalry)	T 14–14	14,225	
October 28	at Sam Houston State	No. 12	Bowers Stadium; Huntsville, TX	L 3–26		
November 4	at Nicholls State*		John L. Guidry Stadium; Thibodaux, LA (NSU Challenge)	L 15–21		
November 9	Jackson State*		Harry Turpin Stadium; Natchitoches, LA	L 14–27	13,100	
November 18	No. 3 Stephen F. Austin		Harry Turpin Stadium; Natchitoches, LA (rivalry)	T 17–17		
*Non-conference game; Rankings from NCAA Division I-AA Football Committee Poll released prior to the game
