= 1989 Alabama State Hornets football team =

American college football season

1989 Alabama State Hornets football
- Conference: Southwestern Athletic Conference
- Record: 5–5–1 (2–4–1 SWAC)
- Head coach: Houston Markham (3rd season)
- Offensive coordinator: Darwin Valentine (3rd season)
- Home stadium: Cramton Bowl

1989 Southwestern Athletic Conference football standings
	Conf.					Overall
Team	W		L		T	W		L		T
No. 13 Grambling State $^	7	–	0	–	0	9	–	3	–	0
No. 17 Jackson State ^	5	–	2	–	0	8	–	4	–	0
Alcorn State	5	–	2	–	0	7	–	3	–	0
Southern	4	–	3	–	0	6	–	4	–	1
Texas Southern	3	–	3	–	1	3	–	7	–	1
Alabama State	2	–	4	–	1	5	–	5	–	1
Prairie View A&M	1	–	6	–	0	1	–	9	–	0
Mississippi Valley State	0	–	7	–	0	1	–	9	–	0
$ – Conference champion; ^ – NCAA Division I-AA playoff participant; Rankings from NCAA Division I-AA Football Committee poll

The 1989 Alabama State Hornets football team represented Alabama State University as a member of the Southwestern Athletic Conference (SWAC) during the 1989 NCAA Division I-AA football season. Led by third-year head coach Houston Markham, the Hornets compiled an overall record of 5–5–1, with a mark of 2–4–1 in conference play, and finished sixth in the SWAC.

== Schedule ==
Date	Opponent	Site	Result	Attendance	Source
September 2	Troy State*	Cramton Bowl; Montgomery, AL	W 16–13	12,000	
September 10	vs. Southern	Ladd Stadium; Mobile, AL (Gulf Coast Classic)	L 14–17		
September 16	Alcorn State	Cramton Bowl; Montgomery, AL	L 13–27	10,000	
September 23	at Texas Southern	Robertson Stadium; Houston, TX	T 16–16		
September 30	at Florida A&M*	Bragg Memorial Stadium; Tallahassee, FL	W 23–8	11,242	
October 7	at Jackson State	Mississippi Veterans Memorial Stadium; Jackson, MS	L 14–35		
October 21	Prairie View A&M	Cramton Bowl; Montgomery, AL	W 47–0	7,000	
October 28	vs. Alabama A&M*	Legion Field; Birmingham, AL (Magic City Classic)	L 10–17		
November 3	vs. Grambling State	Legion Field; Birmingham, AL (Steel City Classic)	L 6–28	24,000	
November 11	vs. Mississippi Valley State	Ray Stadium; Meridian, MS	W 44–13	4,000	
November 23	Tuskegee*	Cramton Bowl; Montgomery, AL (Turkey Day Classic)	W 26–20		
*Non-conference game
