= 1989 Texas Southern Tigers football team =

American college football season

1989 Texas Southern Tigers football
- Conference: Southwestern Athletic Conference
- Record: 3–7–1 (3–3–1 SWAC)
- Head coach: Wally Highsmith (1st season)
- Home stadium: Robertson Stadium

1989 Southwestern Athletic Conference football standings
| | Conf. | | | | | Overall |
| Team | W | | L | | T | W | | L | | T |
|---|---|---|---|---|---|---|---|---|---|---|
| No. 13 Grambling State $^ | 7 | – | 0 | – | 0 | 9 | – | 3 | – | 0 |
| No. 17 Jackson State ^ | 5 | – | 2 | – | 0 | 8 | – | 4 | – | 0 |
| Alcorn State | 5 | – | 2 | – | 0 | 7 | – | 3 | – | 0 |
| Southern | 4 | – | 3 | – | 0 | 6 | – | 4 | – | 1 |
| Texas Southern | 3 | – | 3 | – | 1 | 3 | – | 7 | – | 1 |
| Alabama State | 2 | – | 4 | – | 1 | 5 | – | 5 | – | 1 |
| Prairie View A&M | 1 | – | 6 | – | 0 | 1 | – | 9 | – | 0 |
| Mississippi Valley State | 0 | – | 7 | – | 0 | 1 | – | 9 | – | 0 |
$ – Conference champion; ^ – NCAA Division I-AA playoff participant; Rankings from NCAA Division I-AA Football Committee poll

The 1989 Texas Southern Tigers football team represented Texas Southern University as a member of the Southwestern Athletic Conference (SWAC) during the 1989 NCAA Division I-AA football season. Led by first-year head coach Wally Highsmith, the Tigers compiled an overall record of 3–7–1, with a mark of 3–3–1 in conference play, and finished fifth in the SWAC.

== Schedule ==
| Date | Opponent | Site | Result | Attendance | Source |
|---|---|---|---|---|---|
| September 2 | Prairie View A&M | Robertson Stadium; Houston, TX (Labor Day Classic) | W 45–7 | | |
| September 9 | at No. 2 Texas A&I* | Javelina Stadium; Kingsville, TX | L 17–34 | | |
| September 16 | at Southern | A. W. Mumford Stadium; Baton Rouge, LA | W 21–14 | | |
| September 23 | Alabama State | Robertson Stadium; Houston, TX | T 16–16 | | |
| September 30 | at Sam Houston State* | Bowers Stadium; Huntsville, TX | L 20–28 | | |
| October 7 | Alcorn State | Robertson Stadium; Houston, TX | L 15–40 | | |
| October 14 | Southwest Texas State* | Robertson Stadium; Houston, TX | L 17–34 | | |
| October 21 | at Mississippi Valley State | Magnolia Stadium; Itta Bena, MS | W 22–0 | | |
| October 28 | at Grambling State | Eddie G. Robinson Memorial Stadium; Grambling, LA | L 6–49 | | |
| November 4 | Jackson State | Robertson Stadium; Houston, TX | L 6–45 | | |
| November 18 | at UCF* | Florida Citrus Bowl; Orlando, FL | L 12–49 | 14,082 | |
*Non-conference game; Rankings from NCAA Division II Football Committee Poll released prior to the game
