= 1989 Grambling State Tigers football team =

American college football season

1989 Grambling State Tigers football

SWAC champion

NCAA Division I-AA First Round, L 56–59 at Stephen F. Austin
- Conference: Southwestern Athletic Conference
- Record: 9–3 (7–0 SWAC)
- Head coach: Eddie Robinson (47th season)
- Home stadium: Eddie G. Robinson Memorial Stadium

1989 Southwestern Athletic Conference football standings
	Conf.					Overall
Team	W		L		T	W		L		T
No. 13 Grambling State $^	7	–	0	–	0	9	–	3	–	0
No. 17 Jackson State ^	5	–	2	–	0	8	–	4	–	0
Alcorn State	5	–	2	–	0	7	–	3	–	0
Southern	4	–	3	–	0	6	–	4	–	1
Texas Southern	3	–	3	–	1	3	–	7	–	1
Alabama State	2	–	4	–	1	5	–	5	–	1
Prairie View A&M	1	–	6	–	0	1	–	9	–	0
Mississippi Valley State	0	–	7	–	0	1	–	9	–	0
$ – Conference champion; ^ – NCAA Division I-AA playoff participant; Rankings from NCAA Division I-AA Football Committee poll

The 1989 Grambling State Tigers football team represented Grambling State University as a member of the Southwestern Athletic Conference (SWAC) during the 1989 NCAA Division I-AA football season. Led by 47th-year head coach Eddie Robinson, the Tigers compiled an overall record of 9–3 and a mark of 7–0 in conference play, and finished as SWAC champion. Grambling State advanced to the NCAA Division I-AA Football Championship playoffs, where they were defeated by Stephen F. Austin in the first round.

== Schedule ==
Date	Opponent	Rank	Site	Result	Attendance	Source
September 3	vs. Alcorn State		Los Angeles Memorial Coliseum; Los Angeles, CA (Los Angeles Football Classic)	W 30–14	33,722	
September 9	vs. Howard*		Giants Stadium; East Rutherford, NJ (Whitney Young Memorial Classic)	L 0–6	28,653	
September 16	Alabama A&M*		Eddie G. Robinson Memorial Stadium; Grambling, LA	W 34–22		
September 30	vs. Prairie View A&M		Cotton Bowl; Dallas, TX (rivalry)	W 39–0	59,302	
October 7	at Tennessee State*		Vanderbilt Stadium; Nashville, TN	L 14–15	23,353	
October 14	vs. Mississippi Valley State		Independence Stadium; Shreveport. LA (Red River Classic)	W 74–14		
October 21	at Jackson State		Mississippi Veterans Memorial Stadium; Jackson, MS	W 27–17		
October 28	Texas Southern		Eddie G. Robinson Memorial Stadium; Grambling, LA	W 49–6		
November 3	vs. Alabama State		Legion Field; Birmingham, AL (Steel City Classic)	W 28–6	24,000	
November 11	South Carolina State*	No. 16	Eddie G. Robinson Memorial Stadium; Grambling, LA	W 56–10	4,757	
November 18	vs. Southern	No. 14	Louisiana Superdome; New Orleans, LA (Bayou Classic)	W 44–30	59,774	
November 25	at No. 3 Stephen F. Austin*	No. 13	Homer Bryce Stadium; Nacogdoches, TX (NCAA Division I-AA First Round)	L 56–59		
*Non-conference game; Rankings from NCAA Division I-AA Football Committee Poll released prior to the game
