= 1989 Jackson State Tigers football team =

American college football season

1989 Jackson State Tigers football

NCAA Division I-AA First Round, L 7–48 vs. Montana
- Conference: Southwestern Athletic Conference
- Record: 8–4 (5–2 SWAC)
- Head coach: W. C. Gorden (14th season)
- Home stadium: Mississippi Veterans Memorial Stadium

1989 Southwestern Athletic Conference football standings
	Conf.					Overall
Team	W		L		T	W		L		T
No. 13 Grambling State $^	7	–	0	–	0	9	–	3	–	0
No. 17 Jackson State ^	5	–	2	–	0	8	–	4	–	0
Alcorn State	5	–	2	–	0	7	–	3	–	0
Southern	4	–	3	–	0	6	–	4	–	1
Texas Southern	3	–	3	–	1	3	–	7	–	1
Alabama State	2	–	4	–	1	5	–	5	–	1
Prairie View A&M	1	–	6	–	0	1	–	9	–	0
Mississippi Valley State	0	–	7	–	0	1	–	9	–	0
$ – Conference champion; ^ – NCAA Division I-AA playoff participant; Rankings from NCAA Division I-AA Football Committee poll

The 1989 Jackson State Tigers football team represented Jackson State University as a member of the Southwestern Athletic Conference (SWAC) during the 1989 NCAA Division I-AA football season. Led by 14th-year head coach W. C. Gorden, the Tigers compiled an overall record of 8–4 and a mark of 5–2 in conference play, and finished tied for second in the SWAC. Jackson State finished their season with a loss against Montana in the Division I-AA playoffs.

== Schedule ==
Date	Opponent	Rank	Site	Result	Attendance	Source
September 2	Stephen F. Austin*		Mississippi Veterans Memorial Stadium; Jackson, MS	L 28–41		
September 9	Tennessee State*		Mississippi Veterans Memorial Stadium; Jackson, MS (rivalry)	W 33–7		
September 16	at Prairie View A&M		Edward L. Blackshear Field; Prairie View, TX	W 66–0		
September 23	Mississippi Valley State	No. 18	Mississippi Veterans Memorial Stadium; Jackson, MS	W 49–0		
September 30	vs. Bethune–Cookman*	No. 15	Hoosier Dome; Indianapolis, IN (Circle City Classic)	W 27–7	53,822	
October 7	Alabama State	No. 13	Mississippi Veterans Memorial Stadium; Jackson, MS	W 35–14		
October 14	Southern	No. 12	Mississippi Veterans Memorial Stadium; Jackson, MS (rivalry)	L 7–21		
October 21	Grambling State		Mississippi Veterans Memorial Stadium; Jackson, MS	L 17–27		
November 4	at Texas Southern		Robertson Stadium; Houston, TX	W 45–6		
November 9	at Northwestern State*		Harry Turpin Stadium; Natchitoches, LA	W 27–14	13,100	
November 18	Alcorn State		Mississippi Veterans Memorial Stadium; Jackson, MS (rivalry)	W 23–20		
November 25	at No. 6 Montana*	No. 17	Washington–Grizzly Stadium; Missoula, MT (NCAA Division I-AA First Round)	L 7–48	11,854	
*Non-conference game; Rankings from NCAA Division I-AA Football Committee Poll released prior to the game
