= 1989 Sam Houston State Bearkats football team =

American college football season

1989 Sam Houston State Bearkats football
- Conference: Southland Conference
- Record: 3–8 (2–4 Southland)
- Head coach: Ron Randleman (8th season)
- Home stadium: Bowers Stadium

1989 Southland Conference football standings
	Conf.					Overall
Team	W		L		T	W		L		T
No. 3 Stephen F. Austin $^	5	–	0	–	1	12	–	2	–	1
Northwestern State	3	–	1	–	2	4	–	5	–	2
SW Texas State	3	–	3	–	0	5	–	6	–	0
Northeast Louisiana	2	–	3	–	1	4	–	6	–	1
McNeese State	2	–	4	–	0	5	–	6	–	0
North Texas	2	–	4	–	0	5	–	6	–	0
Sam Houston State	2	–	4	–	0	3	–	8	–	0
$ – Conference champion; ^ – NCAA Division I-AA playoff participant; Rankings from NCAA Division I-AA Football Committee poll

The 1989 Sam Houston State Bearkats football team represented Sam Houston State University as a member of the Southland Conference during the 1989 NCAA Division I-AA football season. Led by eighth-year head coach Ron Randleman, the Bearkats compiled an overall record of 3–8 with a mark of 2–4 in conference play, and finished tied for fifth in the Southland.

== Schedule ==
Date	Opponent	Site	Result	Attendance	Source
September 9	Montana State*	Bowers Stadium; Huntsville, TX	L 10–15	10,150	
September 16	at Angelo State*	San Angelo Stadium; San Angelo, TX	L 7–38	13,000	
September 23	at Lamar*	Cardinal Stadium; Beaumont, TX	L 0–41	8,028	
September 30	Texas Southern*	Bowers Stadium; Huntsville, TX	W 28–20		
October 7	Nicholls State*	Bowers Stadium; Huntsville, TX	L 14–28		
October 14	Northeast Louisiana	Bowers Stadium; Huntsville, TX	L 13–21		
October 21	at North Texas	Fouts Field; Denton, TX	W 14–6	9,127	
October 28	No. 12 Northwestern State	Bowers Stadium; Huntsville, TX	W 26–3		
November 4	at No. 4 Stephen F. Austin	Homer Bryce Stadium; Nacogdoches, TX (Battle of the Piney Woods)	L 7–45	16,137	
November 11	McNeese State	Bowers Stadium; Huntsville, TX	L 14–31		
November 18	at Southwest Texas State	Bobcat Stadium; San Marcos, TX (rivalry)	L 0–24		
*Non-conference game; Rankings from NCAA Division I-AA Football Committee Poll released prior to the game
