= 1989 Prairie View A&M Panthers football team =

American college football season

1989 Prairie View A&M Panthers football
- Conference: Southwestern Athletic Conference
- Record: 2–8 (1–6 SWAC)
- Head coach: Haney Catchings (2nd season)
- Defensive coordinator: Ronald Beard (6th season)
- Home stadium: Edward L. Blackshear Field

1989 Southwestern Athletic Conference football standings
	Conf.					Overall
Team	W		L		T	W		L		T
No. 13 Grambling State $^	7	–	0	–	0	9	–	3	–	0
No. 17 Jackson State ^	5	–	2	–	0	8	–	4	–	0
Alcorn State	5	–	2	–	0	7	–	3	–	0
Southern	4	–	3	–	0	6	–	4	–	1
Texas Southern	3	–	3	–	1	3	–	7	–	1
Alabama State	2	–	4	–	1	5	–	5	–	1
Prairie View A&M	1	–	6	–	0	1	–	9	–	0
Mississippi Valley State	0	–	7	–	0	1	–	9	–	0
$ – Conference champion; ^ – NCAA Division I-AA playoff participant; Rankings from NCAA Division I-AA Football Committee poll

The 1989 Prairie View A&M Panthers football team represented Prairie View A&M University as a member of the Southwestern Athletic Conference (SWAC) during the 1989 NCAA Division I-AA football season. Led by second-year head coach Haney Catchings, the Panthers compiled an overall record of 2–8 and a mark of 1–6 in conference play, and finished seventh in the SWAC.

On October 28, the Panthers defeated Mississippi Valley State 21–12. This would be the Panthers' last win until September 26, 1998.

== Off-field incidents ==
The 1989 season was marred by several off-field incidents within the program. Several players accused Catchings of withholding their financial aid until they proved themselves on the field. Catchings would even take their book away because players weren't playing well enough. After university administration was slow to act, several players boycotted the program. The academic performance of the team also came under scrutiny; at one point only 12 players had a GPA over 2.0.

=== Dismissal of Catchings and shuttering of program ===
In May 1990, the university announced that the athletic programs were suffering major financial issues, generating a deficit of $3 million over the previous 5 seasons; a month later, the Houston Chronicle reported that more than $100,000 was missing from the athletic department. Head coach Haney Catchings was later charged for filing fraudulent expense reports. Catchings pleaded guilty, was sentenced to five years probation, and fined over $1,500.

Due to financial difficulties, the university announced that it would be shuttering all athletic programs except for track and field. The football program would return for the 1991 season.

== Schedule ==
Date	Opponent	Site	Result	Attendance	Source
September 2	at Texas Southern	Robertson Stadium; Houston, TX (Labor Day Classic)	L 7–45		
September 9	at Southwest Texas State*	Bobcat Stadium; San Marcos, TX	L 0–41		
September 16	Jackson State	Edward L. Blackshear Field; Prairie View, TX	L 0–66		
September 23	Southern	Kyle Field; College Station, TX	L 3–34		
September 30	vs. Grambling State	Cotton Bowl; Dallas, TX (State Fair Classic)	L 0–39	59,302	
October 7	at Arkansas–Pine Bluff*	War Memorial Stadium; Little Rock, AR	W 32–35 (forfeit win)		
October 21	at Alabama State	Cramton Bowl; Montgomery, AL	L 0–47	7,000	
October 28	Mississippi Valley State	Edward L. Blackshear Field; Prairie View, TX	W 21–12		
November 4	at Langston*	Anderson Stadium; Langston, OK	L 18–19	7,200	
November 11	vs. Alcorn State	Martin Stadium; Natchez, MS	L 7–56	5,161	
*Non-conference game
