= Wally Highsmith =

American gridiron football player and coach (born 1943)

Profile
- Position: Offensive line

Personal information
- Born: August 27, 1943 (age 83); Tampa, Florida, U.S.
- Listed height: 6 ft 4 in (1.93 m)
- Listed weight: 238 lb (108 kg)

Career information
- High school: Roosevelt School (Lake Wales, Florida)
- College: Florida A&M

Career history

Playing
- 1968–1969: Denver Broncos
- 1970–1971: Montreal Alouettes
- 1972: Houston Oilers
- 1973: Montreal Alouettes
- 1974–1975: Memphis Southmen
- 1976–1977: Toronto Argonauts

Coaching
- 1980–1985: Miami Edison Senior HS (FL) (Head coach)
- 1986–1988: Florida A&M (Defensive coordinator)
- 1989–1993: Texas Southern (Head coach)
- 1994–1997: Florida A&M (Offensive line coach and recruiting coordinator)
- 2000: Toronto Argonauts (Defensive line)
- 2000: Toronto Argonauts (Interim head coach)
- 2006: Selma HS (AL) (Defensive coordinator)

Awards and highlights
- Grey Cup champion (1970); 1974 All-WFL Team
- Stats at Pro Football Reference

Walter "Buzz" Highsmith (August 27, 1943) is an American former gridiron football player and coach. He played professionally in the American Football League (AFL), Canadian Football League (CFL), World Football League (WFL), and National Football League (NFL) as an offensive lineman. Highsmith served as the head football coach at Texas Southern University from 1989 to 1993, compiling a record of 19–34–2.

== Playing ==
Highsmith started his career with the Denver Broncos of the AFL, playing 23 games in two seasons. He next played with the Montreal Alouettes for two years and 22 games, winning the Grey Cup championship in 1970. He then headed to the Houston Oilers of the NFL, playing nine games in one season. Highsmith returned to the Montreal Alouettes in 1973, playing only one game. The Memphis Southmen of the new WFL called, and he played two seasons with them. He finished his career back in the CFL with the Toronto Argonauts, playing 21 games over two years.

== Coaching ==
After retiring, Highsmith remained in the Montreal area and worked as a physical education teacher in the West Island. In 1980, he moved to Florida to become a teacher and football coach at Miami Edison Senior High School. He then served as the defensive coordinator at Florida A&M until 1989, when he became the head football coach at Texas Southern. Over five seasons, he compiled a 19–34–2 record and coached 22 players who signed NFL contracts, including Pro Football Hall of Famer Michael Strahan. He was fired after a 2–9 1993 campaign that included six consecutive losses to end the season. He returned to Florida A&M as offensive line coach and recruiting coordinator. He was fired in 1998 after the Tallahassee Democrat reported that Highsmith has possible violated NCAA rules. He was the Toronto Argonauts defensive line coach in 2000 and served as interim head coach for two games following the resignation of John Huard. In 2006, he was the defensive coordinator at Selma High School in Selma, Alabama.

== Personal life ==
Highsmith is the father of former NFL player Alonzo Highsmith and uncle of former NFL player Ali Highsmith.

== Head coaching record ==
Year	Team	Overall	Conference	Standing	Bowl/playoffs
Texas Southern Tigers (Southwestern Athletic Conference) (1989–1993)
1989	Texas Southern	3–7–1	3–3–1	5th	
1990	Texas Southern	4–7	2–4	T–5th	
1991	Texas Southern	5–5–1	3–3–1	T–4th	
1992	Texas Southern	5–6	3–4	T–4th	
1993	Texas Southern	2–9	1–6	7th	
Texas Southern:		19–34–2	12–20–2		
Total:		19–34–2			
