= 1989 McNeese State Cowboys football team =

American college football season

1989 McNeese State Cowboys football
- Conference: Southland Conference
- Record: 5–6 (2–4 Southland)
- Head coach: Sonny Jackson (3rd season)
- Home stadium: Cowboy Stadium

1989 Southland Conference football standings
	Conf.					Overall
Team	W		L		T	W		L		T
No. 3 Stephen F. Austin $^	5	–	0	–	1	12	–	2	–	1
Northwestern State	3	–	1	–	2	4	–	5	–	2
SW Texas State	3	–	3	–	0	5	–	6	–	0
Northeast Louisiana	2	–	3	–	1	4	–	6	–	1
McNeese State	2	–	4	–	0	5	–	6	–	0
North Texas	2	–	4	–	0	5	–	6	–	0
Sam Houston State	2	–	4	–	0	3	–	8	–	0
$ – Conference champion; ^ – NCAA Division I-AA playoff participant; Rankings from NCAA Division I-AA Football Committee poll

The 1989 McNeese State Cowboys football team was an American football team that represented McNeese State University as a member of the Southland Conference (Southland) during the 1989 NCAA Division I-AA football season. In their third year under head coach Sonny Jackson, the team compiled an overall record of 5–6, with a mark of 2–4 in conference play, and finished tied for fifth in the Southland.

== Schedule ==
Date	Opponent	Site	Result	Attendance	Source
September 2	No. 7 (D-II) Mississippi College*	Cowboy Stadium; Lake Charles, LA	W 28–21	15,233	
September 9	Samford*	Cowboy Stadium; Lake Charles, LA	W 49–14		
September 16	at Northeast Louisiana	Malone Stadium; Monroe, LA	L 14–17		
September 23	at Northwestern State	Harry Turpin Stadium; Natchitoches, LA (rivalry)	L 14–15		
September 30	Nicholls State*	Cowboy Stadium; Lake Charles, LA	W 28–14		
October 14	at No. 9 Arkansas State*	Indian Stadium; Jonesboro, AR	L 16–21		
October 21	No. 5 Stephen F. Austin	Cowboy Stadium; Lake Charles, LA	L 14–42		
October 28	Southwest Texas State	Cowboy Stadium; Lake Charles, LA	W 21–7		
November 4	North Texas	Cowboy Stadium; Lake Charles, LA	L 19–31		
November 11	at Sam Houston State	Bowers Stadium; Huntsville, TX	W 31–14		
November 18	at Lamar*	Cardinal Stadium; Beaumont, TX (rivalry)	L 17–22		
*Non-conference game; Rankings from NCAA Division I-AA Football Committee Poll released prior to the game
