= 1989 Northeast Louisiana Indians football team =

American college football season

1989 Northeast Louisiana Indians football
- Conference: Southland Conference
- Record: 4–6–1 (2–3–1 SLC)
- Head coach: Dave Roberts (1st season)
- Home stadium: Malone Stadium

1989 Southland Conference football standings
	Conf.					Overall
Team	W		L		T	W		L		T
No. 3 Stephen F. Austin $^	5	–	0	–	1	12	–	2	–	1
Northwestern State	3	–	1	–	2	4	–	5	–	2
SW Texas State	3	–	3	–	0	5	–	6	–	0
Northeast Louisiana	2	–	3	–	1	4	–	6	–	1
McNeese State	2	–	4	–	0	5	–	6	–	0
North Texas	2	–	4	–	0	5	–	6	–	0
Sam Houston State	2	–	4	–	0	3	–	8	–	0
$ – Conference champion; ^ – NCAA Division I-AA playoff participant; Rankings from NCAA Division I-AA Football Committee poll

The 1989 Northeast Louisiana Indians football team was an American football team that represented Northeast Louisiana University (now known as the University of Louisiana at Monroe) as part of the Southland Conference during the 1989 NCAA Division I-AA football season. In their first year under head coach Dave Roberts, the team compiled a 4–6–1 record.

== Schedule ==
Date	Opponent	Site	Result	Attendance	Source
September 9	Nicholls State*	Malone Stadium; Monroe, LA	W 29–13		
September 16	McNeese State	Malone Stadium; Monroe, LA	W 17–14		
September 23	at Southwest Texas State	Bobcat Stadium; San Marcos, TX	L 7–26		
September 30	Southwestern Louisiana*	Malone Stadium; Monroe, LA	L 10–24	14,109	
October 7	at Mississippi State*	Scott Field; Starkville, MS	L 14–28	25,105	
October 14	at Sam Houston State	Bowers Stadium; Huntsville, TX	W 21–13		
October 21	vs. Northwestern State	Independence Stadium; Shreveport, LA (rivalry)	T 14–14	14,225	
October 28	Arkansas State*	Malone Stadium; Monroe, LA	W 13–7	19,466	
November 4	at Louisiana Tech*	Joe Aillet Stadium; Ruston, LA	L 6–24	23,300	
November 11	at Stephen F. Austin	Homer Bryce Stadium; Nacogdoches, TX	L 45–66	10,218	
November 18	North Texas	Malone Stadium; Monroe, LA	L 25–28		
*Non-conference game
