= 1989 Stephen F. Austin Lumberjacks football team =

American college football season

1989 Stephen F. Austin Lumberjacks football

SLC champion

NCAA Division I-AA Championship, L 34–37 vs. Georgia Southern
- Conference: Southland Conference

Ranking
- Coaches: No. 3
- Record: 12–2–1 (5–0–1 Southland)
- Head coach: Lynn Graves (1st season)
- Home stadium: Homer Bryce Stadium

1989 Southland Conference football standings
| | Conf. | | | | | Overall |
| Team | W | | L | | T | W | | L | | T |
|---|---|---|---|---|---|---|---|---|---|---|
| No. 3 Stephen F. Austin $^ | 5 | – | 0 | – | 1 | 12 | – | 2 | – | 1 |
| Northwestern State | 3 | – | 1 | – | 2 | 4 | – | 5 | – | 2 |
| SW Texas State | 3 | – | 3 | – | 0 | 5 | – | 6 | – | 0 |
| Northeast Louisiana | 2 | – | 3 | – | 1 | 4 | – | 6 | – | 1 |
| McNeese State | 2 | – | 4 | – | 0 | 5 | – | 6 | – | 0 |
| North Texas | 2 | – | 4 | – | 0 | 5 | – | 6 | – | 0 |
| Sam Houston State | 2 | – | 4 | – | 0 | 3 | – | 8 | – | 0 |
$ – Conference champion; ^ – NCAA Division I-AA playoff participant; Rankings from NCAA Division I-AA Football Committee poll

The 1989 Stephen F. Austin Lumberjacks football team was an American football team that represented Stephen F. Austin State University as a member of the Southland Conference during the 1989 NCAA Division I-AA football season. In their first year under head coach Lynn Graves, the team compiled an overall record of 12–2–1, with a mark of 5–0–1 in conference play, and finished as Southland champion. Stephen F. Austin advanced to the NCAA Division I-AA Championship and were defeated by Georgia Southern.

== Schedule ==
| Date | Opponent | Rank | Site | Result | Attendance | Source |
|---|---|---|---|---|---|---|
| September 2 | at Jackson State* | | Mississippi Veterans Memorial Stadium; Jackson, MS | W 41–28 | | |
| September 9 | at Boise State* | | Bronco Stadium; Boise, ID | L 12–23 | 19,918 | |
| September 23 | Nicholls State* | No. 17 | Homer Bryce Stadium; Nacogdoches, TX | W 24–7 | | |
| September 30 | at Lamar* | No. 14 | Cardinal Stadium; Beaumont, TX | W 44–20 | | |
| October 7 | Southwest Texas State | No. 12 | Homer Bryce Stadium; Nacogdoches, TX | W 32–21 | | |
| October 14 | at No. 16 North Texas | No. 10 | Fouts Field; Denton, TX | W 35–16 | 20,252 | |
| October 21 | at McNeese State | No. 5 | Cowboy Stadium; Lake Charles, LA | W 42–14 | | |
| October 28 | at Eastern Washington* | No. 5 | Woodward Field; Cheney, WA | W 42–36 | | |
| November 4 | Sam Houston State | No. 4 | Homer Bryce Stadium; Nacogdoches, TX (rivalry) | W 45–7 | 16,137 | |
| November 11 | Northeast Louisiana | No. 3 | Homer Bryce Stadium; Nacogdoches, TX | W 66–45 | 10,218 | |
| November 18 | at Northwestern State | No. 3 | Harry Turpin Stadium; Natchitoches, LA (rivalry) | T 17–17 | | |
| November 25 | No. 13 Grambling State* | No. 3 | Homer Bryce Stadium; Nacogdoches, TX (NCAA Division I-AA First Round) | W 59–56 | | |
| December 2 | No. 9 Southwest Missouri State* | No. 3 | Homer Bryce Stadium; Nacogdoches, TX (NCAA Division I-AA Quarterfinal) | W 55–25 | | |
| December 9 | at No. 2 Furman* | No. 3 | Paladin Stadium; Greenville, SC (NCAA Division I-AA Semifinal) | W 21–19 | 7,015 | |
| December 16 | at No. 1 Georgia Southern* | No. 3 | Paulson Stadium; Statesboro, GA (NCAA Division I-AA Championship Game) | L 34–37 | 25,725 | |
*Non-conference game; Rankings from NCAA Division I-AA Football Committee Poll released prior to the game
