= Craig McEwen =

American football player (born 1965)

No. 26, 32, 31, 83, 45
- Positions: Tight end, running back

Personal information
- Born: December 16, 1965 (age 60); Northport, New York, U.S.
- Listed height: 6 ft 1 in (1.85 m)
- Listed weight: 220 lb (100 kg)

Career information
- High school: Northport
- College: Utah
- NFL draft: 1987: undrafted

Career history
- Washington Redskins (1987–1988); San Diego Chargers (1989–1991); Amsterdam Admirals (1995)

Awards and highlights
- Super Bowl champion (XXII)

Career NFL statistics
- Receptions: 108
- Receiving yards: 1,310
- Receiving touchdowns: 6
- Stats at Pro Football Reference

Craig Eugene McEwen (born December 16, 1965) is an American former professional football player who was a tight end in the National Football League (NFL) for the Washington Redskins and San Diego Chargers. He played college football for the Utah Utes. He attended Northport High School, Long Island, New York.

== College career ==
McEwen attended University of Utah and Santa Ana College. Offensive coordinator, Jack Reilly offered McEwen a full scholarship to Utah. In June 2015, he was ranked one of the best Tight ends in the university's history with 64 catches for 721 yards and seven touchdowns.

== Professional career ==
=== Washington Redskins ===
1987's NFL strike created some opportunities for McEwen, who was one of the replacement players who filled in for the regulars while regular NFL players were on strike. McEwen played under head coach Joe Gibbs. He was then hired as a regular player and earned a Super Bowl ring from the Redskins’ 42-10 rout of the Denver Broncos in Super Bowl XXII.

McEwen earned in 1987 a signing bonus $3,500 and $40,000 minimum for a rookie.

=== San Diego Chargers ===
After two years with the Redskins, McEwen then spent his last three seasons in San Diego. November 30, 1990 McEwen was placed on the injured reserve list with a thigh injury.

=== Amsterdam Admirals World League ===
McEwen was selected #41 in the inaugural season of the franchise in the World League of American Football (WLAF) as Tight end. Jamie Martin was the quarterback who threw McEwen a 22-yard pass for a touchdown

== After football ==
Chris Washington and McEwen head up the San Diego Chapter of NFL Alumni.

McEwen was named Northport's High School Athletic Hall of Fame to its inaugural class on September 20, 2014.
