= 1989 Alcorn State Braves football team =

American college football season

1989 Alcorn State Braves football
- Conference: Southwestern Athletic Conference
- Record: 7–3 (5–2 SWAC)
- Head coach: Theophilus Danzy (4th season)
- Home stadium: Henderson Stadium

1989 Southwestern Athletic Conference football standings
	Conf.					Overall
Team	W		L		T	W		L		T
No. 13 Grambling State $^	7	–	0	–	0	9	–	3	–	0
No. 17 Jackson State ^	5	–	2	–	0	8	–	4	–	0
Alcorn State	5	–	2	–	0	7	–	3	–	0
Southern	4	–	3	–	0	6	–	4	–	1
Texas Southern	3	–	3	–	1	3	–	7	–	1
Alabama State	2	–	4	–	1	5	–	5	–	1
Prairie View A&M	1	–	6	–	0	1	–	9	–	0
Mississippi Valley State	0	–	7	–	0	1	–	9	–	0
$ – Conference champion; ^ – NCAA Division I-AA playoff participant; Rankings from NCAA Division I-AA Football Committee poll

The 1989 Alcorn State Braves football team represented Alcorn State University as a member of the Southwestern Athletic Conference (SWAC) during the 1989 NCAA Division I-AA football season. Led by fourth-year head coach Theophilus Danzy, the Braves compiled an overall record of 7–3, with a conference record of 5–2, and finished tied for second in the SWAC.

== Schedule ==
Date	Opponent	Rank	Site	Result	Attendance	Source
September 3	vs. Grambling State		Los Angeles Memorial Coliseum; Los Angeles, CA (Los Angeles Football Classic)	L 14–30	33,722	
September 16	at Alabama State		Cramton Bowl; Montgomery, AL	W 27–13	10,000	
September 23	Abilene Christian*		Henderson Stadium; Lorman, MS	W 31–21		
October 7	at Texas Southern		Robertson Stadium; Houston, TX	W 40–15		
October 14	Lamar*		Henderson Stadium; Lorman, MS	W 32–16		
October 21	at Southern		A. W. Mumford Stadium; Baton Rouge, LA	W 27–10		
October 28	at Southwest Missouri State*	No. 20	Briggs Stadium; Springfield, MO	L 19–59	9,148	
November 4	Mississippi Valley State		Henderson Stadium; Lorman, MS	W 39–6		
November 11	vs. Prairie View A&M		Martin Stadium; Natchez, MS	W 56–7	5,161	
November 18	at Jackson State		Mississippi Veterans Memorial Stadium; Jackson, MS (rivalry)	L 20–23		
*Non-conference game; Rankings from NCAA Division I-AA Football Committee Poll released prior to the game
