= 1989 Mississippi Valley State Delta Devils football team =

American college football season

1989 Mississippi Valley State Delta Devils football
- Conference: Southwestern Athletic Conference
- Record: 2–8 (0–7 SWAC)
- Head coach: Kenneth Pettiford (3rd season)
- Home stadium: Magnolia Stadium

1989 Southwestern Athletic Conference football standings
	Conf.					Overall
Team	W		L		T	W		L		T
No. 13 Grambling State $^	7	–	0	–	0	9	–	3	–	0
No. 17 Jackson State ^	5	–	2	–	0	8	–	4	–	0
Alcorn State	5	–	2	–	0	7	–	3	–	0
Southern	4	–	3	–	0	6	–	4	–	1
Texas Southern	3	–	3	–	1	3	–	7	–	1
Alabama State	2	–	4	–	1	5	–	5	–	1
Prairie View A&M	1	–	6	–	0	1	–	9	–	0
Mississippi Valley State	0	–	7	–	0	1	–	9	–	0
$ – Conference champion; ^ – NCAA Division I-AA playoff participant; Rankings from NCAA Division I-AA Football Committee poll

The 1989 Mississippi Valley State Delta Devils football team represented Mississippi Valley State University as a member of the Southwestern Athletic Conference (SWAC) during the 1989 NCAA Division I-AA football season. Led by third-year head coach Kenneth Pettiford, the Delta Devils compiled an overall record of 2–8, with a conference record of 0–7, and finished eighth in the SWAC.

== Schedule ==
Date	Opponent	Site	Result	Attendance	Source
September 2	at Hampton*	Armstrong Stadium; Hampton, VA	L 3–6		
September 9	Arkansas–Pine Bluff*	Magnolia Stadium; Itta Bena, MS	W 0–20 (forfeit win)		
September 16	Lane*	Magnolia Stadium; Itta Bena, MS	W 28–15		
September 23	at No. 18 Jackson State	Mississippi Veterans Memorial Stadium; Jackson, MS	L 0–49		
September 30	Southern	Magnolia Stadium; Itta Bena, MS	L 6–28		
October 14	vs. Grambling State	Independence Stadium; Shreveport. LA (Red River Classic)	L 14–74		
October 21	Texas Southern	Magnolia Stadium; Itta Bena, MS	L 0–22		
October 28	at Prairie View A&M	Edward L. Blackshear Field; Prairie View, TX	L 12–21		
November 4	at Alcorn State	Henderson Stadium; Lorman, MS	L 6–39		
November 11	vs. Alabama State	Ray Stadium; Meridian, MS	L 13–44	4,000	
*Non-conference game; Rankings from NCAA Division I-AA Football Committee Poll released prior to the game
