= 1989 Southern Jaguars football team =

American college football season

1989 Southern Jaguars football
- Conference: Southwestern Athletic Conference
- Record: 6–4–1 (4–3 SWAC)
- Head coach: Gerald Kimble (1st season)
- Defensive coordinator: Sherman Simmons (1st season)
- Home stadium: A. W. Mumford Stadium

1989 Southwestern Athletic Conference football standings
	Conf.					Overall
Team	W		L		T	W		L		T
No. 13 Grambling State $^	7	–	0	–	0	9	–	3	–	0
No. 17 Jackson State ^	5	–	2	–	0	8	–	4	–	0
Alcorn State	5	–	2	–	0	7	–	3	–	0
Southern	4	–	3	–	0	6	–	4	–	1
Texas Southern	3	–	3	–	1	3	–	7	–	1
Alabama State	2	–	4	–	1	5	–	5	–	1
Prairie View A&M	1	–	6	–	0	1	–	9	–	0
Mississippi Valley State	0	–	7	–	0	1	–	9	–	0
$ – Conference champion; ^ – NCAA Division I-AA playoff participant; Rankings from NCAA Division I-AA Football Committee poll

The 1989 Southern Jaguars football team represented Southern University as a member of the Southwestern Athletic Conference (SWAC) during the 1989 NCAA Division I-AA football season. Led by first-year head coach Gerald Kimble, the Jaguars compiled an overall record of 6–4–1, with a conference record of 4–3, and finished fourth in the SWAC.

== Schedule ==
Date	Opponent	Site	Result	Source
September 10	vs. Alabama State	Ladd Stadium; Mobile, AL (Gulf Coast Classic)	W 17–14	
September 16	Texas Southern	A. W. Mumford Stadium; Baton Rouge, LA	L 14–21	
September 23	at Prairie View A&M	Kyle Field; College Station, TX	W 34–3	
September 30	at Mississippi Valley State	Magnolia Stadium; Itta Bena, MS	W 28–6	
October 7	District of Columbia*	A. W. Mumford Stadium; Baton Rouge, LA	W 42–14	
October 14	at No. 12 Jackson State	Mississippi Veterans Memorial Stadium; Jackson, MS (rivalry)	W 21–7	
October 21	Alcorn State	A. W. Mumford Stadium; Baton Rouge, LA	L 10–27	
October 28	Nicholls State*	A. W. Mumford Stadium; Baton Rouge, LA	W 31–28	
November 4	at Florida A&M*	Bragg Memorial Stadium; Tallahassee, FL	L 13–21	
November 11	Tennessee State*	A. W. Mumford Stadium; Baton Rouge, LA	T 7–7	
November 18	vs. No. 14 Grambling State	Louisiana Superdome; New Orleans, LA (Bayou Classic)	L 30–44	
*Non-conference game; Rankings from NCAA Division I-AA Football Committee Poll released prior to the game
