= 1989 Southwest Texas State Bobcats football team =

American college football season

1989 Southwest Texas State Bobcats football
- Conference: Southland Conference
- Record: 5–6 (3–3 SLC)
- Head coach: John O'Hara (7th season)
- Home stadium: Bobcat Stadium

1989 Southland Conference football standings
	Conf.					Overall
Team	W		L		T	W		L		T
No. 3 Stephen F. Austin $^	5	–	0	–	1	12	–	2	–	1
Northwestern State	3	–	1	–	2	4	–	5	–	2
SW Texas State	3	–	3	–	0	5	–	6	–	0
Northeast Louisiana	2	–	3	–	1	4	–	6	–	1
McNeese State	2	–	4	–	0	5	–	6	–	0
North Texas	2	–	4	–	0	5	–	6	–	0
Sam Houston State	2	–	4	–	0	3	–	8	–	0
$ – Conference champion; ^ – NCAA Division I-AA playoff participant; Rankings from NCAA Division I-AA Football Committee poll

The 1989 Southwest Texas State Bobcats football team was an American football team that represented Southwest Texas State University (now known as Texas State University) during the 1989 NCAA Division I-AA football season as a member of the Southland Conference (SLC). In their seventh year under head coach John O'Hara, the team compiled an overall record of 5–6 with a mark of 3–3 in conference play.

== Schedule ==
Date	Opponent	Site	Result	Attendance	Source
September 2	Texas A&I*	Bobcat Stadium; San Marcos, TX	L 13–28		
September 9	Prairie View A&M*	Bobcat Stadium; San Marcos, TX	W 41–0		
September 23	No. 12 Northeast Louisiana	Bobcat Stadium; San Marcos, TX	W 26–7		
September 30	Northwestern State	Bobcat Stadium; San Marcos, TX	L 14–31	8,146	
October 7	at No. 12 Stephen F. Austin	Homer Bryce Stadium; Nacogdoches, TX	L 21–32		
October 14	at Texas Southern*	Robertson Stadium; Houston, TX	W 34–17		
October 21	at Nicholls State*	John L. Guidry Stadium; Thibodaux, LA (rivalry)	L 21–22		
October 28	at McNeese State	Cowboy Stadium; Lake Charles, LA	L 7–21		
November 4	Lamar*	Bobcat Stadium; San Marcos, TX	L 19–20		
November 11	at North Texas	Fouts Field; Denton, TX	W 25–20		
November 18	Sam Houston State	Bobcat Stadium; San Marcos, TX (rivalry)	W 24–0		
*Non-conference game; Rankings from NCAA Division I-AA Football Committee Poll released prior to the game
