= Joe Caravello =

American football player (born 1963)

No. 82, 88, 46
- Position: Tight end

Personal information
- Born: June 6, 1963 (age 63); Santa Monica, California, U.S.
- Listed height: 6 ft 3 in (1.91 m)
- Listed weight: 270 lb (122 kg)

Career information
- High school: El Segundo (CA)
- College: Tulane
- NFL draft: 1986: undrafted

Career history
- Atlanta Falcons (1986)*; Washington Redskins (1987–1988); San Diego Chargers (1989–1990)
- * Offseason or practice squad member only

Awards and highlights
- Super Bowl champion (XXII)

Career NFL statistics
- Receptions: 16
- Receiving yards: 160
- Touchdowns: 1
- Stats at Pro Football Reference

Joseph John Caravello (born June 6, 1963) is an American former professional football player who was a tight end in the National Football League (NFL) for the Washington Redskins and the San Diego Chargers. He played college football for the Tulane Green Wave.
