= Leo Goeas =

American football player (born 1966)

No. 67, 79, 62
- Positions: Tackle, guard

Personal information
- Born: August 15, 1966 (age 60); Honolulu, Hawaii, U.S.
- Listed height: 6 ft 4 in (1.93 m)
- Listed weight: 300 lb (136 kg)

Career information
- High school: Kamehameha Schools (Honolulu, Hawaii)
- College: Hawaii
- NFL draft: 1990: 3rd round, 60th overall pick

Career history
- San Diego Chargers (1990–1992); Los Angeles/St. Louis Rams (1993–1996); Baltimore Ravens (1997); Denver Broncos (1998–1999)*
- * Offseason or practice squad member only

Awards and highlights
- PFWA All-Rookie Team (1990); Second-team All-WAC (1989)

Career NFL statistics
- Games played: 111
- Games started: 81
- Fumble recoveries: 4
- Stats at Pro Football Reference

Leo Douglas Goeas (born August 15, 1966) is an American former professional football player who was an offensive lineman in the National Football League (NFL) from 1990 through 1997. He played college football at the University of Hawaii. He was selected by the San Diego Chargers in the third round of the 1990 NFL draft with the 60th overall pick.
