= Jack Reilly (American football) =

American football player and coach (born 1946)

Biographical details
- Born: May 22, 1945 (age 81); Boston, Massachusetts, U.S.

Playing career
- 1963: Washington State
- 1964: Santa Monica
- 1965–1966: Long Beach State
- Position: Quarterback

Coaching career (HC unless noted)
- 1968–1974: Beverly Hills HS (CA) (assistant)
- 1975–1979: Beverly Hills HS (CA)
- 1980–1981: El Camino (OC)
- 1982–1984: El Camino
- 1985–1989: Utah (OC)
- 1990–1993: San Diego Chargers (QB)
- 1994: Los Angeles Raiders (RB)
- 1995–1996: St. Louis Rams (OC/QB)
- 1997: Dallas Cowboys (QB)
- 1998–1999: New England Patriots (QB)
- 2000–2001: Dallas Cowboys (OC)
- 2002: Dallas Cowboys (OA)

Head coaching record
- Overall: 19–11 (junior college)
- Bowls: 0–1 (junior college)

Jack Reilly (born May 22, 1945) is an American former football coach. He served as an offensive coordinator in the National Football League (NFL) with the St. Louis Rams and the Dallas Cowboys. Reilly's background is in the Don Coryell–Ernie Zampese-style West Coast offense. Reilly was the head football coach at Beverly Hills High School in Beverly Hills High School from 1975 to 1979 and El Camino College in Alondra Park, California from 1982 to 1984. He attended high school in Culver City, California.

== Head coaching record ==
=== Junior college football ===
Year	Team	Overall	Conference	Standing	Bowl/playoffs
El Camino Warriors (Metropolitan Conference) (1982–1983)
1982	El Camino	7–3	4–2	T–2nd	
1983	El Camino	7–3	4–2	2nd	L South Bay Kiwanis Bowl
El Camino Warriors (Pac-9 Conference) (1984)
1984	El Camino	5–5	3–5	T–3rd	
El Camino:		19–11	11–9		
Total:		19–11			
