= 1989 Gator Bowl =

The 1989 Gator Bowl may refer to:

- 1989 Gator Bowl (January) - January 1, 1989, game between the Georgia Bulldogs and the Michigan State Spartans
- 1989 Gator Bowl (December) - December 30, 1989, game between the Clemson Tigers and the West Virginia Mountaineers
