= Dale Strahm =

American football player and coach

Biographical details
- Born: c. 1943; Toledo, Ohio, U.S.
- Education: Bowling Green State University

Playing career

Football
- c. 1964: Ohio Northern

Track and field
- c. 1964: Ohio Northern

Coaching career (HC unless noted)
- 1965: Ohio Northern (freshmen)
- 1966–1968: Warren Western Reserve HS (OH) (AHC/OC)
- 1969: Bowling Green (GA)
- 1970: Bellevue HS (OH) (DC)
- 1971: Taft HS(OH) (Note: Did not coach a game)
- 1971: Bowling Green (freshmen)
- 1972–1976: Bowling Green (DC/LB)
- 1977–1980: Navy (DC)
- 1981–1988: Georgia (LB)
- 1988: Georgia (interim DC)
- 1989: Western Carolina
- 1990–1993: Duke (DC)
- 1994–1996: Temple (DC)

Administrative career (AD unless noted)
- 1998–2005: Denver Broncos (scout)
- 2006–2010: Houston Texans (DCS)
- 2011: Houston Texans (scout)

Head coaching record
- Overall: 3–7–1

Dale Strahm (born c. 1943) is an American former football coach and player. He served as the head coach of Western Carolina University in 1989, compiling a record of 3–7–1. Strahm also served as an assistant coach for Bowling Green, Bellevue High School, Navy, Georgia, Duke, and Temple. He also was a scout for the Denver Broncos and Houston Texans.

== Early life and education ==
Strahm was born in c. 1943, in Toledo, Ohio, and grew up there. He attended Libbey High School in Toledo, and was named all-city at quarterback. He attended Ohio Northern University, and played football and track and field. He graduated in 1965 with a bachelor of science degree.

== Coaching career ==
After graduating, Strahm accepted a position as Ohio Northern freshman football coach. He led them to a winning season, but left for Warren Western Reserve High School after just one year. He served as assistant head coach and offensive coordinator there for three seasons, helping them win 23 of 30 games in his time with the team.

In 1969, Strahm served as a graduate assistant at Bowling Green State University, where he received a master's degree. He joined Bellevue High School in 1970 and spent the season as their defensive coordinator.

In 1971, Strahm accepted a position as head coach of Taft High School, but changed his mind a month later to be freshman coach at Bowling Green. He spent the next five seasons as a defensive assistant before being hired by Navy in 1977. Strahm was named linebackers coach at the University of Georgia in 1981. Strahm spent eight seasons at Georgia coaching the linebackers, and also served as interim defensive coordinator in late 1988.

In April 1989, Strahm was named head coach at Western Carolina University. Western Carolina started the season 2–1, winning the second game on a last-second game-winning interception return, but lost or tied the next eight, finishing the year with a record of 3–7–1. Strahm resigned after the season to become defensive coordinator at Duke University. He served in that position for four seasons until accepting the same role at Temple University in 1994. He was fired following the 1996 season.

In 1998, Strahm was hired by the Denver Broncos of the National Football League (NFL) as a college scout. He served in that position until being hired by the Houston Texans in 2006 as director of college scouting. He was demoted in 2011 to being a scout, and retired in 2012.

== Head coaching record ==
| Year | Team | Overall | Conference | Standing | Bowl/playoffs |
|---|---|---|---|---|---|
Western Carolina Catamounts (Southern Conference) (1989)
| 1989 | Western Carolina | 3–7–1 | 1–4–1 | 6th | |
| Western Carolina: | | 3–7–1 | 1–4–1 | | |
| Total: | | 3–7–1 | | | |
