= 1989 VMI Keydets football team =

American college football season

1989 VMI Keydets football
- Conference: Southern Conference
- Record: 2–8–1 (1–4–1 SoCon)
- Head coach: Jim Shuck (1st season)
- Home stadium: Alumni Memorial Field

1989 Southern Conference football standings
	Conf.					Overall
Team	W		L		T	W		L		T
No. 2 Furman $^	7	–	0	–	0	12	–	2	–	0
No. 7 Appalachian State ^	5	–	2	–	0	9	–	3	–	0
Marshall	4	–	3	–	0	6	–	5	–	0
East Tennessee State	4	–	3	–	0	4	–	7	–	0
Chattanooga	2	–	4	–	1	3	–	7	–	1
Western Carolina	1	–	4	–	1	3	–	7	–	1
VMI	1	–	4	–	1	2	–	8	–	1
The Citadel	1	–	5	–	1	5	–	5	–	1
$ – Conference champion; ^ – NCAA Division I-AA playoff participant; Rankings from NCAA Division I-AA Football Committee poll

The 1989 VMI Keydets football team was an American football team that represented the Virginia Military Institute (VMI) as a member of the Southern Conference (SoCon) during the 1989 NCAA Division I-AA football season. In their first year under head coach Jim Shuck, the team compiled an overall record of 2–8–1, with a mark of 1–4–1 in conference play, tying for sixth place in the SoCon. In January 1989 Shuck was introduced as the 25th all-time head coach of the Keydets after serving as offensive coordinator at Army.

== Schedule ==
Date	Opponent	Site	Result	Attendance	Source
September 2	East Tennessee State	Alumni Memorial Field; Lexington, VA	L 16–17	5,100	
September 9	at North Carolina*	Kenan Memorial Stadium; Chapel Hill, NC	L 7–49	50,400	
September 16	No. 20 William & Mary*	Alumni Memorial Field; Lexington, VA (rivalry)	L 17–24	4,826	
September 23	at Richmond*	City Stadium; Richmond, VA (rivalry)	L 22–27	14,163	
September 30	Furman	Alumni Memorial Field; Lexington, VA	L 6–30	6,200	
October 7	at No. 9 Appalachian State	Kidd Brewer Stadium; Boone, NC	L 0–34	12,379	
October 21	at James Madison*	JMU Stadium; Harrisonburg, VA	L 0–25	9,115	
October 28	at Marshall	Fairfield Stadium; Huntington, WV	L 10–40	15,807	
November 4	Davidson*	Alumni Memorial Field; Lexington, VA	W 39–36	3,865	
November 11	The Citadel	Alumni Memorial Field; Lexington, VA (rivalry)	W 20–10	8,125	
November 18	at Chattanooga	Chamberlain Field; Chattanooga, TN	T 14–14	3,118	
*Non-conference game; Rankings from NCAA Division I-AA Football Committee Poll released prior to the game
