= 1989 North Carolina Tar Heels football team =

American college football season

1989 North Carolina Tar Heels football
- Conference: Atlantic Coast Conference
- Record: 1–10 (0–7 ACC)
- Head coach: Mack Brown (2nd season)
- Offensive scheme: Multiple
- Defensive coordinator: Carl Torbush (2nd season)
- Base defense: 4–3
- Captains: Clarence Carter; Pat Crowley; Torin Dorn; Cecil Gray; Jonathan Hall
- Home stadium: Kenan Memorial Stadium

1989 Atlantic Coast Conference football standings
	Conf.					Overall
Team	W		L		T	W		L		T
No. 18 Virginia +	6	–	1	–	0	10	–	3	–	0
Duke +	6	–	1	–	0	8	–	4	–	0
No. 12 Clemson	5	–	2	–	0	10	–	2	–	0
Georgia Tech	4	–	3	–	0	7	–	4	–	0
NC State	4	–	3	–	0	7	–	5	–	0
Maryland	2	–	5	–	0	3	–	7	–	1
Wake Forest	1	–	6	–	0	2	–	8	–	1
North Carolina	0	–	7	–	0	1	–	10	–	0
+ – Conference co-champions; Rankings from AP Poll

The 1989 North Carolina Tar Heels football team represented the University of North Carolina at Chapel Hill during the 1989 NCAA Division I-A football season. The Tar Heels played their home games at Kenan Memorial Stadium in Chapel Hill, North Carolina and competed in the Atlantic Coast Conference. The team was led by head coach Mack Brown.

== Schedule ==
Date	Time	Opponent	Site	TV	Result	Attendance	Source
September 9	4:00 p.m.	VMI*	Kenan Memorial Stadium; Chapel Hill, NC		W 49–7	50,400	
September 16	1:30 p.m.	at Kentucky*	Commonwealth Stadium; Lexington, KY		L 6–13	50,174	
September 23	1:00 p.m.	at No. 18 NC State	Carter–Finley Stadium; Raleigh, NC (rivalry)		L 6–40	57,200	
September 30	4:00 p.m.	Navy*	Kenan Memorial Stadium; Chapel Hill, NC		L 7–12	38,000	
October 7	12:00 p.m.	Wake Forest	Kenan Memorial Stadium; Chapel Hill, NC (rivalry)	JPS	L 16–17	47,500	
October 14	1:00 p.m.	at Virginia	Scott Stadium; Charlottesville, VA (South's Oldest Rivalry)		L 17–50	34,600	
October 21	1:00 p.m.	at Georgia Tech	Bobby Dodd Stadium; Atlanta, GA		L 14–17	41,114	
October 28	12:00 p.m.	at Maryland	Byrd Stadium; College Park, MD		L 0–38	27,441	
November 4	12:00 p.m.	No. 21 Clemson	Kenan Memorial Stadium; Chapel Hill, NC	JPS	L 3–35	44,500	
November 11	2:00 p.m.	South Carolina*	Kenan Memorial Stadium; Chapel Hill, NC (rivalry)		L 20–27	44,200	
November 18	12:00 p.m.	No. 25 Duke	Kenan Memorial Stadium; Chapel Hill, NC (Victory Bell)		L 0–41	46,000	
*Non-conference game; Rankings from AP Poll released prior to the game; All times are in Eastern time
