= 1989 Tennessee Tech Golden Eagles football team =

American college football season

1989 Tennessee Tech Golden Eagles football
- Conference: Ohio Valley Conference
- Record: 5–5 (3–3 OVC)
- Head coach: Jim Ragland (4th season)
- Home stadium: Tucker Stadium

1989 Ohio Valley Conference football standings
	Conf.					Overall
Team	W		L		T	W		L		T
No. T–10 Middle Tennessee $^	6	–	0	–	0	9	–	4	–	0
No. 12 Eastern Kentucky ^	5	–	1	–	0	9	–	3	–	0
Murray State	3	–	3	–	0	6	–	4	–	1
Tennessee State	3	–	3	–	0	5	–	5	–	1
Tennessee Tech	3	–	3	–	0	5	–	5	–	0
Austin Peay	1	–	5	–	0	1	–	10	–	0
Morehead State	0	–	6	–	0	1	–	10	–	0
$ – Conference champion; ^ – NCAA Division I-AA playoff participant; Records adjusted for Morehead State forfeit of conference victories over Austin Peay and Tennessee Tech, and non-conference victories over Kentucky State and Samford; Rankings from NCAA Division I-AA Football Committee poll

The 1989 Tennessee Tech Golden Eagles football team represented Tennessee Technological University (commonly referred to as Tennessee Tech) as a member of the Ohio Valley Conference (OVC) during the 1989 NCAA Division I-AA football season. Led by fourth-year head coach Jim Ragland, the Golden Eagles compiled an overall record of 5–5, with a mark of 3–3 in conference play, and finished tied for third in the OVC.

== Schedule ==
Date	Opponent	Site	Result	Attendance	Source
September 2	Lock Haven*	Tucker Stadium; Cookeville, TN	W 38–17		
September 9	at Chattanooga*	Chamberlain Field; Chattanooga, TN	W 28–10	9,769	
September 16	at Samford*	Seibert Stadium; Homewood, AL	L 23–27		
September 30	No. 10 Murray State	Tucker Stadium; Cookeville, TN	W 21–20		
October 14	No. 1 Eastern Kentucky	Tucker Stadium; Cookeville, TN	L 20–21	12,120	
October 21	at Western Kentucky*	L. T. Smith Stadium; Bowling Green, KY	L 14–61	18,000	
October 28	Tennessee State	Tucker Stadium; Cookeville, TN	L 19–21	7,654	
November 4	at Morehead State	Jayne Stadium; Morehead, KY	W 8–14 (forfeit win)		
November 11	at Austin Peay	Municipal Stadium; Clarksville, TN	W 17–15		
November 18	No. 12 Middle Tennessee	Tucker Stadium; Cookeville, TN	L 3–24	6,555	
*Non-conference game; Rankings from NCAA Division I-AA Football Committee Poll released prior to the game
