= 1989 Tennessee State Tigers football team =

American college football season

1989 Tennessee State Tigers football
- Conference: Ohio Valley Conference
- Record: 5–5–1 (3–3 OVC)
- Head coach: Joe Gilliam Sr. (1st season)
- Home stadium: Hale Stadium; Vanderbilt Stadium

1989 Ohio Valley Conference football standings
	Conf.					Overall
Team	W		L		T	W		L		T
No. T–10 Middle Tennessee $^	6	–	0	–	0	9	–	4	–	0
No. 12 Eastern Kentucky ^	5	–	1	–	0	9	–	3	–	0
Murray State	3	–	3	–	0	6	–	4	–	1
Tennessee State	3	–	3	–	0	5	–	5	–	1
Tennessee Tech	3	–	3	–	0	5	–	5	–	0
Austin Peay	1	–	5	–	0	1	–	10	–	0
Morehead State	0	–	6	–	0	1	–	10	–	0
$ – Conference champion; ^ – NCAA Division I-AA playoff participant; Records adjusted for Morehead State forfeit of conference victories over Austin Peay and Tennessee Tech, and non-conference victories over Kentucky State and Samford; Rankings from NCAA Division I-AA Football Committee poll

The 1989 Tennessee State Tigers football team represented Tennessee State University as a member of the Ohio Valley Conference (OVC) during the 1989 NCAA Division I-AA football season. Led by first-year head coach Joe Gilliam Sr., the Tigers compiled an overall record of 5–5–1, with a conference record of 3–3, and finished tied for third in the OVC.

== Schedule ==
Date	Opponent	Site	Result	Attendance	Source
September 2	No. 18 Middle Tennessee	Vanderbilt Stadium; Nashville, TN	L 7–36	29,500	
September 9	at Jackson State*	Mississippi Veterans Memorial Stadium; Jackson, MS	L 7–33		
September 15	vs. Central State (OH)*	Municipal Stadium; Cleveland, OH (Cosby Cleveland Classic)	W 14–13	8,078	
September 23	vs. Florida A&M*	Bobby Dodd Stadium; Atlanta, GA (Ebony Classic)	L 9–21	47,373	
September 30	No. T–1 Eastern Kentucky	Hale Stadium; Nashville, TN	L 9–21		
October 7	Grambling State*	Vanderbilt Stadium; Nashville, TN	W 15–14	23,353	
October 14	vs. Murray State	Liberty Bowl Memorial Stadium; Memphis, TN	L 24–27	8,879	
October 21	Morehead State	Hale Stadium; Nashville, TN	W 23–14	4,187	
October 28	at Tennessee Tech	Tucker Stadium; Cookeville, TN	W 21–19	7,654	
November 4	Austin Peay	Hale Stadium; Nashville, TN	W 38–10	8,679	
November 11	at Southern*	A. W. Mumford Stadium; Baton Rouge, LA	T 7–7		
*Non-conference game; Rankings from NCAA Division I-AA Football Committee Poll released prior to the game
