= 1989 Furman Paladins football team =

American college football season

1989 Furman Paladins football

SoCon champion

NCAA Division I-AA Semifinal, L 19–21 vs. Stephen F. Austin
- Conference: Southern Conference
- Record: 12–2 (7–0 SoCon)
- Head coach: Jimmy Satterfield (4th season)
- Captains: David Adams; Brian Pitts; Pat Turner
- Home stadium: Paladin Stadium

1989 Southern Conference football standings
	Conf.					Overall
Team	W		L		T	W		L		T
No. 2 Furman $^	7	–	0	–	0	12	–	2	–	0
No. 7 Appalachian State ^	5	–	2	–	0	9	–	3	–	0
Marshall	4	–	3	–	0	6	–	5	–	0
East Tennessee State	4	–	3	–	0	4	–	7	–	0
Chattanooga	2	–	4	–	1	3	–	7	–	1
Western Carolina	1	–	4	–	1	3	–	7	–	1
VMI	1	–	4	–	1	2	–	8	–	1
The Citadel	1	–	5	–	1	5	–	5	–	1
$ – Conference champion; ^ – NCAA Division I-AA playoff participant; Rankings from NCAA Division I-AA Football Committee poll

The 1989 Furman Paladins football team represented Furman University as a member of the Southern Conference (SoCon) during the 1989 NCAA Division I-AA football season. In their fourth year under head coach Jimmy Satterfield, the Paladins compiled an overall record of 12–2 with a conference mark of 7–0, winning the SoCon title. Furman advanced to the NCAA Division I-AA Football Championship playoffs, where they defeated William & Mary in the first round and Youngstown State in the quarterfinals before losing to Stephen F. Austin in the semifinals.

== Schedule ==
Date	Opponent	Rank	Site	Result	Attendance	Source
September 2	at No. 12 (I-A) Clemson*	No. 1	Memorial Stadium; Clemson, SC	L 0–30	80,508	
September 9	at South Carolina State*	No. 1	Oliver C. Dawson Stadium; Orangeburg, SC	W 17–7	15,074	
September 16	Presbyterian*	No. 1	Paladin Stadium; Greenville, SC	W 59–17	10,240	
September 30	VMI	No. T–5	Alumni Memorial Field; Lexington, VA	W 30–6	6,200	
October 7	No. 16 Marshall	No. T–4	Paladin Stadium; Greenville, SC	W 34–13	11,418	
October 14	No. 8 Appalachian State	No. 5	Paladin Stadium; Greenville, SC	W 31–6	13,435	
October 21	Wofford*	No. 3	Paladin Stadium; Greenville, SC (rivalry)	W 42–7	10,723	
October 28	at Western Carolina	No. 3	Whitmire Stadium; Cullowhee, NC	W 17–3	13,227	
November 4	Chattanooga	No. 3	Paladin Stadium; Greenville, SC	W 27–17	14,788	
November 11	East Tennessee State	No. 2	Paladin Stadium; Greenville, SC	W 44–20	17,001	
November 18	at The Citadel	No. 2	Johnson Hagood Stadium; Charleston, SC (rivalry)	W 44–9	20,357	
November 25	No. T–10 William & Mary*	No. 2	Paladin Stadium; Greenville, SC (NCAA Division I-AA First Round)	W 24–10	8,642	
December 2	No. 14 Youngstown State*	No. 2	Paladin Stadium; Greenville, SC (NCAA Division I-AA Quarterfinal)	W 42–23	8,033	
December 9	No. 3 Stephen F. Austin*	No. 2	Paladin Stadium; Greenville, SC (NCAA Division I-AA Semifinal)	L 19–21	7,015	
*Non-conference game; Rankings from NCAA Division I-AA Football Committee Poll released prior to the game
