= 1989 Eastern Kentucky Colonels football team =

American college football season

1989 Eastern Kentucky Colonels football

NCAA Division I-AA First Round, L 24–28 at Youngstown State
- Conference: Ohio Valley Conference
- Record: 9–3 (5–1 OVC)
- Head coach: Roy Kidd (26th season)
- Home stadium: Hanger Field

1989 Ohio Valley Conference football standings
	Conf.					Overall
Team	W		L		T	W		L		T
No. T–10 Middle Tennessee $^	6	–	0	–	0	9	–	4	–	0
No. 12 Eastern Kentucky ^	5	–	1	–	0	9	–	3	–	0
Murray State	3	–	3	–	0	6	–	4	–	1
Tennessee State	3	–	3	–	0	5	–	5	–	1
Tennessee Tech	3	–	3	–	0	5	–	5	–	0
Austin Peay	1	–	5	–	0	1	–	10	–	0
Morehead State	0	–	6	–	0	1	–	10	–	0
$ – Conference champion; ^ – NCAA Division I-AA playoff participant; Records adjusted for Morehead State forfeit of conference victories over Austin Peay and Tennessee Tech, and non-conference victories over Kentucky State and Samford; Rankings from NCAA Division I-AA Football Committee poll

The 1989 Eastern Kentucky Colonels football team represented Eastern Kentucky University as a member of the Ohio Valley Conference (OVC) during the 1989 NCAA Division I-AA football season. Led by 26th-year head coach Roy Kidd, the Colonels compiled an overall record of 9–3, with a mark of 5–1 in conference play, and finished second in the OVC. Eastern Kentucky advanced to the NCAA Division I-AA First Round and were defeated by Youngstown State.

== Schedule ==
Date	Opponent	Rank	Site	Result	Attendance	Source
September 2	Western Carolina*		Hanger Field; Richmond, KY	W 31–13	14,800	
September 9	at Delaware State*		Alumni Stadium; Dover, DE	W 48–13	4,400	
September 23	No. 19 Western Kentucky*	No. 1	Hanger Field; Richmond, KY (rivalry)	W 24–3	19,200	
September 30	at Tennessee State	No. T–1	Hale Stadium; Nashville, TN	W 21–9		
October 7	Austin Peay	No. 1	Hanger Field; Richmond, KY	W 45–20		
October 14	at Tennessee Tech	No. 1	Tucker Stadium; Cookeville, TN	W 21–20	12,120	
October 21	No. 13 Marshall*	No. 1	Hanger Field; Richmond, KY	W 38–23		
October 28	Murray State	No. 1	Hanger Field; Richmond, KY	W 38–36		
November 4	at Middle Tennessee	No. 1	Johnny "Red" Floyd Stadium; Murfreesboro, TN	L 19–24	10,000	
November 11	at UCF*	No. 4	Florida Citrus Bowl; Orlando, FL	L 19–20	17,506	
November 18	at Morehead State	No. 10	Jayne Stadium; Morehead, KY (rivalry)	W 38–31 ^{3OT}		
November 25	No. 14 Youngstown State*	No. 12	Hanger Field; Richmond, KY (NCAA Division I-AA First Round)	L 24–28	3,898	
*Non-conference game; Rankings from NCAA Division I-AA Football Committee Poll released prior to the game
