= 1989 Clemson Tigers football team =

American college football season

1989 Clemson Tigers football

Gator Bowl champion

Gator Bowl, W 27–7 vs. West Virginia
- Conference: Atlantic Coast Conference

Ranking
- Coaches: No. 11
- AP: No. 12
- Record: 10–2 (5–2 ACC)
- Head coach: Danny Ford (11th full, 12th overall season)
- Offensive scheme: Option
- Base defense: 4–3
- Captains: Wesley McFadden; Chris Morocco
- Home stadium: Memorial Stadium

1989 Atlantic Coast Conference football standings
	Conf.					Overall
Team	W		L		T	W		L		T
No. 18 Virginia +	6	–	1	–	0	10	–	3	–	0
Duke +	6	–	1	–	0	8	–	4	–	0
No. 12 Clemson	5	–	2	–	0	10	–	2	–	0
Georgia Tech	4	–	3	–	0	7	–	4	–	0
NC State	4	–	3	–	0	7	–	5	–	0
Maryland	2	–	5	–	0	3	–	7	–	1
Wake Forest	1	–	6	–	0	2	–	8	–	1
North Carolina	0	–	7	–	0	1	–	10	–	0
+ – Conference co-champions; Rankings from AP Poll

The 1989 Clemson Tigers football team represented Clemson University in the 1989 NCAA Division I-A football season. The Tigers were led by head coach Danny Ford, who was serving his final season as head coach at Clemson. The Tigers played their home games in Memorial Stadium. The Tigers finished the 1989 season with a 10–2 record and defeated West Virginia 27–7 in the 1989 Gator Bowl.

== Schedule ==
Date	Time	Opponent	Rank	Site	TV	Result	Attendance	Source
September 2	1:00 p.m.	No. 1 (I-AA) Furman*	No. 12	Memorial Stadium; Clemson, SC		W 30–0	80,508	
September 9	7:30 p.m.	at No. 16 Florida State*	No. 10	Doak Campbell Stadium; Tallahassee, FL (rivalry)	ESPN	W 34–23	61,897	
September 16	7:00 p.m.	at Virginia Tech*	No. 7	Lane Stadium; Blacksburg, VA		W 27–7	47,152	
September 23	12:00 p.m.	Maryland	No. 7	Memorial Stadium; Clemson, SC	JPS	W 31–7	77,301	
September 30	12:00 p.m.	at Duke	No. 7	Wallace Wade Stadium; Durham, NC	JPS	L 17–21	22,600	
October 7	2:30 p.m.	Virginia	No. 15	Memorial Stadium; Clemson, SC	CBS	W 34–20	80,638	
October 14	1:00 p.m.	Georgia Tech^{†}	No. 14	Memorial Stadium; Clemson, SC (rivalry)		L 14–30	81,550	
October 21	4:00 p.m.	No. 12 NC State		Memorial Stadium; Clemson, SC (Textile Bowl)	ESPN	W 30–10	81,569	
October 28	1:00 p.m.	Wake Forest	No. 22	Memorial Stadium; Clemson, SC		W 44–10	71,335	
November 4	12:00 p.m.	at North Carolina	No. 21	Kenan Memorial Stadium; Chapel Hill, NC	JPS	W 35–3	44,500	
November 18	7:30 p.m.	at South Carolina*	No. 15	Williams–Brice Stadium; Columbia, SC (rivalry)	ESPN	W 45–0	74,509	
December 30	8:00 p.m.	vs. No. 17 West Virginia*	No. 14	Gator Bowl Stadium; Jacksonville, FL (Gator Bowl)	ESPN	W 27–7	82,911	
*Non-conference game; ^{†}Homecoming; Rankings from AP Poll released prior to the game; All times are in Eastern time

== Personnel ==
=== Incoming recruiting class ===
- Nick Blinsky (C; Struthers, Ohio; Struthers HS)
- Rodney Blunt (TB; Pensacola, Florida; Pine Forest HS)
- Brentson Buckner (MG; Columbus, Georgia; Carver HS)
- Greg Burk (FB; Lawton, Oklahoma; Lawton HS)
- Pat Burris (DB; Rock Hill, South Carolina; Northwestern HS)
- Arthur Bussie (OLB; Camden, New Jersey; Camden HS)
- Darren Calhoun (LB; McCormick, South Carolina; McCormick HS)
- Jason Davis (WR; Pensacola, Florida; Pine Forest HS)
- Steve Derriso (LB; Huntsville, Alabama; Grissom HS)
- Garth Fennigan (QB; Harlingen, Texas; Harlingen HS)
- Eric Geter (CB; Newnan, Georgia; Newnan HS)
- Tyrone Gibson (LB; Hartsville, South Carolina; Hartsville HS)
- Rudy Harris (TB; Brockton, Massachusetts; Brockton HS)
- David Hogue (OG; New Castle PA; Laurel HS)
- Brent LeJeune (OT; Lake Charles, Louisiana; Barbe HS)
- Richard Moncrief (QB; Montgomery, Alabama; Davis HS)
- Robert O'Neal (CB; Clarkston, Georgia; Clarkston HS)
- Thad Ridgley (FB; Ambridge, Pennsylvania; Ambridge HS)
- Larry Ryans (CB; Greenwood, South Carolina; Greenwood HS)
- Stacy Seegars (MG; Kershaw, South Carolina; Andrew Jackson HS)
- Ashley Sheppard (OLB; Greenville, North Carolina; North Pitt HS)
- Tyrone Simpson (DT; Rock Hill, South Carolina; Northwestern HS)
- Terry Smith (WR; Clemson, South Carolina; Daniel HS)
- Daniel Telley (OLB; Anderson, South Carolina; T.L.Hanna HS)
- Franklin Thomas (TE; New Orleans, Louisiana; St. Augustine HS)
- James Trapp (SS; Lawton, Oklahoma; Lawton HS)
- Scott Vaughn (OT; Phillipsburg, New Jersey; Phillipsburg HS)
- Pierre Wilson (DT; Jackson, Mississippi; Provine HS)

=== Roster ===
1989 Clemson Tigers football team roster
Players			Coaches
Offense: Pos. / # / Name / Class; WR / 41 / Doug Thomas / Jr	Defense: Pos. / # / Name / Class; LB / 44 / Levon Krikland / So	Special teams: Pos. / # / Name / Class	Head coach: Danny Ford; Coordinators/assistant coaches: Robert McFarland – Graduate assistant; Legend: (C) Team captain; (S) Suspended; (I) Ineligible; Injured; Redshirt; Roster

=== Depth chart ===
Defense

FS
James Lott
Norris Brown
Chris Hart

WLB	MLB	SLB
⋅	Ed McDaniel	⋅
Kenzil Jackson	Vince Taylor	⋅
Dorian Mariable	Shane Scott	⋅

SS
Arlington Nunn
Tyron Mouzon
Marc Taylor

CB
Dexter Davis
Mitch Belton
Lee Kendall

DE	DT	DT	DE
John Johnson	Vance Hammond	David Davis	Otis Moore
Wayne Harps	Danny Sizer	Rob Bodine	Chester McGlockton
Jeff Taylor	⋅	Al Richard	⋅

CB
Jerome Henderson
Tony Mauney
David Joye

Offense

WR
Rodney Fletcher
Chip Davis
Fernandez West

LT	LG	C	RG	RT
Bruce Bratton	Jeb Flesch	Hank Phillips	Eric Harmon	Stacy Long
Les Hall	David Pluckett	Mike Brown	Mike Samnik	Kelvin Hankins
Chris Ogle	Jamison Temples	John Harris	Ron Wessinger	Mark Shirley

TE
Stacy Fields
Chris Twiss
Mike Berry

WR
Gary Cooper
Doug Thomas
Robbie Spector

QB
Chris Morocco
DeChane Cameron
Michael Carr

RB
Terry Allen
Joe Henderson
Charlie James

FB
Wesley McFadden
Tony Kennedy
Junior Hall

Special teams
PK Chris Gardocki
PK Scott Davis
P Chris Gardocki
P Chet Horton

=== Coaching staff ===
- Danny Ford – Head coach
- Chuck Reedy – Offensive coordinator/quarterbacks
- Bill Oliver – Defensive coordinator/inside linebackers
- – Co-defensive coordinator/defensive backs
- – Assistant head coach/tackles and tight ends
- – Associate head coach/offensive guards and centers
- – Defensive tackles
- – Running backs/special teams
- Miles Aldridge – Defensive linebackers
- Woody McCorvey – Recruiting coordinator/wide receivers
