= Chester McGlockton =

American football player (1969–2011)

No. 91, 75
- Position: Defensive tackle

Personal information
- Born: September 16, 1969; Whiteville, North Carolina, U.S.
- Died: November 30, 2011 (aged 42); San Ramon, California, U.S.
- Listed height: 6 ft 3 in (1.91 m)
- Listed weight: 334 lb (151 kg)

Career information
- High school: Whiteville
- College: Clemson (1989–1991)
- NFL draft: 1992: 1st round, 16th overall pick

Career history
- Los Angeles / Oakland Raiders (1992–1997); Kansas City Chiefs (1998–2000); Denver Broncos (2001–2002); New York Jets (2003)

Awards and highlights
- First-team All-Pro (1995); 2× Second-team All-Pro (1994, 1996); 4× Pro Bowl (1994–1997); First-team All-ACC (1991)

Career NFL statistics
- Tackles: 558
- Sacks: 51
- Forced fumbles: 14
- Fumble recoveries: 10
- Interceptions: 4
- Interception yards: 66
- Defensive touchdowns: 1
- Stats at Pro Football Reference

Chester Morris McGlockton (September 16, 1969 – November 30, 2011) was an American professional football player who was a defensive tackle for 12 seasons with four teams in the National Football League (NFL) from 1992 to 2003. He played college football for the Clemson Tigers.

== Early life ==
McGlockton was a high-school All-American as a tight end and linebacker at Whiteville High School in Whiteville, North Carolina. He played varsity football all four years. During his senior year, he led the Whiteville Wolfpack to a 15–0 record, a state championship and a USA Today national ranking. McGlockton was also honored as the 1987–88 NCHSAA Male Athlete of the Year.

== College career ==
McGlockton played college football at Clemson University under coaches Danny Ford and Ken Hatfield. He scored a touchdown as a freshman in the 1989 Gator Bowl against the West Virginia Mountaineers.

== Professional career ==
Pre-draft measurables
Height	Weight	Arm length	Hand span	40-yard dash	10-yard split	20-yard split	20-yard shuttle	Vertical jump	Broad jump	Bench press
6 ft 3 7/8 in (1.93 m)	337 lb (153 kg)	33 1/4 in (0.84 m)	10 in (0.25 m)	5.12 s	1.82 s	2.98 s	4.72 s	29.0 in (0.74 m)	8 ft 8 in (2.64 m)	21 reps
All values from NFL Combine

McGlockton was selected by the Los Angeles Raiders in the first round (16th overall) of the 1992 NFL draft. He played six seasons with the Raiders, earning all four of his Pro Bowl appearances with the team. McGlockton also played for the Kansas City Chiefs, the Denver Broncos and the New York Jets. McGlockton finished his NFL career with 51 sacks, including a career season-high of 9.5 in 1994.

== NFL stats ==
Year	Team	Games	Combined tackles	Tackles	Assisted tackles	Sacks	Forced fumbles	Fumble recoveries
1992	LA	10	0	0	0	3.0	0	0
1993	LA	16	79	65	14	7.0	0	1
1994	LA	16	62	48	14	9.5	3	1
1995	OAK	16	49	45	4	7.5	1	2
1996	OAK	16	60	56	4	8.0	3	0
1997	OAK	16	63	52	11	4.5	1	1
1998	KC	10	26	22	4	1.0	1	1
1999	KC	16	41	29	12	1.5	1	1
2000	KC	15	40	34	6	4.5	0	0
2001	DEN	16	39	34	5	1.0	0	0
2002	DEN	16	37	32	5	2.5	0	1
2003	NYJ	16	30	23	7	1.0	2	1
Career		179	526	440	86	51.0	12	9

== Post-football ==
In 2009, McGlockton became an intern coach with the University of Tennessee football team. He accepted a defensive assistant position at Stanford in 2010 and worked on David Shaw's staff.

== Death ==
McGlockton died of the consequences of left ventricular hypertrophy on November 30, 2011.
