= 1989 Maryland Terrapins football team =

American college football season

1989 Maryland Terrapins football
- Conference: Atlantic Coast Conference
- Record: 3–7–1 (2–5 ACC)
- Head coach: Joe Krivak (3rd season)
- Defensive coordinator: Greg Williams (3rd season)
- Home stadium: Byrd Stadium

1989 Atlantic Coast Conference football standings
	Conf.					Overall
Team	W		L		T	W		L		T
No. 18 Virginia +	6	–	1	–	0	10	–	3	–	0
Duke +	6	–	1	–	0	8	–	4	–	0
No. 12 Clemson	5	–	2	–	0	10	–	2	–	0
Georgia Tech	4	–	3	–	0	7	–	4	–	0
NC State	4	–	3	–	0	7	–	5	–	0
Maryland	2	–	5	–	0	3	–	7	–	1
Wake Forest	1	–	6	–	0	2	–	8	–	1
North Carolina	0	–	7	–	0	1	–	10	–	0
+ – Conference co-champions; Rankings from AP Poll

The 1989 Maryland Terrapins football team represented University of Maryland, College Park in the 1989 NCAA Division I-A football season. The Terrapins offense scored 215 points while the defense allowed 238 points. Led by head coach Joe Krivak, the team finished the season unranked.

== Schedule ==
Date	Opponent	Site	Result	Attendance	Source
September 2	at NC State	Carter–Finley Stadium; Raleigh, NC	L 6–10	41,780	
September 9	No. 17 West Virginia*	Byrd Stadium; College Park, MD	L 10–14	45,000	
September 16	Western Michigan*	Byrd Stadium; College Park, MD	W 23–0	20,354	
September 23	at No. 7 Clemson	Memorial Stadium; Clemson, SC	L 7–31	77,301	
September 30	at No. 6 Michigan*	Michigan Stadium; Ann Arbor, MI	L 21–41	104,877	
October 7	at Georgia Tech	Bobby Dodd Stadium; Atlanta, GA	L 24–28	32,062	
October 14	at Wake Forest	Groves Stadium; Winston-Salem, NC	W 27–7	17,500	
October 21	Duke^{†}	Byrd Stadium; College Park, MD	L 25–46	38,617	
October 28	North Carolina	Byrd Stadium; College Park, MD	W 38–0	27,441	
November 11	No. 13 Penn State*	Memorial Stadium; Baltimore, MD	T 13–13	61,215	
November 18	No. 16 Virginia	Byrd Stadium; College Park, MD	L 21–48	38,113	
*Non-conference game; ^{†}Homecoming; Rankings from AP Poll released prior to the game

== Roster ==
1989 Maryland Terrapins football team roster
Players
Coaches
Offense

Pos.	#	Name	Class
OT	74	Clarence Jones	Sr
QB	14	Neil O'Donnell	Sr
QB	13	Scott Zolak	Jr

Defense

Pos.	#	Name	Class

Special teams

Pos.	#	Name	Class

Head coach

- Joe Krivak

Coordinators/assistant coaches

- Paul Castonia (GA)

Legend

- (C) Team captain
- (S) Suspended
- (I) Ineligible
- Injured
- Redshirt

== 1989 NFL draft ==
The following players were selected in the 1989 NFL draft.

Player	Position	Round	Overall	NFL team
Neil O'Donnell	Quarterback	3	70	Pittsburgh Steelers
Blaine Rose	Tackle	4	111	New York Giants
