= 1989 Chattanooga Moccasins football team =

American college football season

1989 Chattanooga Moccasins football
- Conference: Southern Conference
- Record: 3–7–1 (2–4–1 SoCon)
- Head coach: Buddy Nix (6th season)
- Captains: Ricky Bray; Junior Jackson
- Home stadium: Chamberlain Field

1989 Southern Conference football standings
	Conf.					Overall
Team	W		L		T	W		L		T
No. 2 Furman $^	7	–	0	–	0	12	–	2	–	0
No. 7 Appalachian State ^	5	–	2	–	0	9	–	3	–	0
Marshall	4	–	3	–	0	6	–	5	–	0
East Tennessee State	4	–	3	–	0	4	–	7	–	0
Chattanooga	2	–	4	–	1	3	–	7	–	1
Western Carolina	1	–	4	–	1	3	–	7	–	1
VMI	1	–	4	–	1	2	–	8	–	1
The Citadel	1	–	5	–	1	5	–	5	–	1
$ – Conference champion; ^ – NCAA Division I-AA playoff participant; Rankings from NCAA Division I-AA Football Committee poll

The 1989 Chattanooga Moccasins football team represented the University of Tennessee at Chattanooga as a member of the Southern Conference (SoCon) in the 1989 NCAA Division I-AA football season. The Moccasins were led by sixth-year head coach Buddy Nix and played their home games at Charmerlain Field. They finished the season 3–7–1 overall and 2–4–1 in SoCon play to tie for fifth place.

== Schedule ==
Date	Opponent	Site	Result	Attendance	Source
September 9	Tennessee Tech*	Chamberlain Field; Chattanooga, TN	L 10–28	9,769	
September 16	at Western Carolina	Whitmire Stadium; Cullowhee, NC	L 20–26	7,435	
September 23	No. 7 Marshall	Chamberlain Field; Chattanooga, TN	W 14–0	9,523	
September 30	at Middle Tennessee*	Johnny "Red" Floyd Stadium; Murfreesboro, TN	L 7–24	3,500	
October 7	Western Kentucky*	Chamberlain Field; Chattanooga, TN	W 19–7	6,207	
October 14	at East Tennessee State	Memorial Center; Johnson City, TN	L 23–24	6,827	
October 21	No. T–15 The Citadel^{†}	Chamberlain Field; Chattanooga, TN	W 17–9	7,921	
October 28	at No. 15 Appalachian State	Kidd Brewer Stadium; Boone, NC	L 7–41	20,122	
November 4	at No. 3 Furman	Paladin Stadium; Greenville, SC	L 17–27	14,788	
November 11	at No. 1 Georgia Southern*	Paulson Stadium; Statesboro, GA	L 13–34	24,078	
November 18	VMI	Chamberlain Field; Chattanooga, TN	T 14–14	3,118	
*Non-conference game; ^{†}Homecoming; Rankings from NCAA Division I-AA Football Committee Poll released prior to the game
