= 1989 Wake Forest Demon Deacons football team =

American college football season

1989 Wake Forest Demon Deacons football
- Conference: Atlantic Coast Conference
- Record: 2–8–1 (1–6 ACC)
- Head coach: Bill Dooley (3rd season)
- Defensive coordinator: Bob Pruett (5th season)
- Captains: James DuBose; Tony Mayberry
- Home stadium: Groves Stadium

1989 Atlantic Coast Conference football standings
	Conf.					Overall
Team	W		L		T	W		L		T
No. 18 Virginia +	6	–	1	–	0	10	–	3	–	0
Duke +	6	–	1	–	0	8	–	4	–	0
No. 12 Clemson	5	–	2	–	0	10	–	2	–	0
Georgia Tech	4	–	3	–	0	7	–	4	–	0
NC State	4	–	3	–	0	7	–	5	–	0
Maryland	2	–	5	–	0	3	–	7	–	1
Wake Forest	1	–	6	–	0	2	–	8	–	1
North Carolina	0	–	7	–	0	1	–	10	–	0
+ – Conference co-champions; Rankings from AP Poll

The 1989 Wake Forest Demon Deacons football team was an American football team that represented Wake Forest University during the 1989 NCAA Division I-A college football season . In their third season under head coach Bill Dooley, the Demon Deacons compiled a 2–8–1 record and finished in seventh place in the Atlantic Coast Conference.

== Schedule ==
Date	Opponent	Site	Result	Attendance	Source
September 9	Appalachian State*	Groves Stadium; Winston-Salem, NC	L 10–15	30,200	
September 16	No. 19 NC State	Groves Stadium; Winston-Salem, NC (rivalry)	L 17–27	25,250	
September 23	at Army*	Michie Stadium; West Point, NY	L 10–14	35,898	
September 30	Rice*	Groves Stadium; Winston-Salem, NC	T 17–17	12,100	
October 7	at North Carolina	Kenan Memorial Stadium; Chapel Hill, NC (rivalry)	W 17–16	47,500	
October 14	Maryland	Groves Stadium; Winston-Salem, NC	L 7–27	17,500	
October 21	at Virginia	Scott Stadium; Charlottesville, VA	L 28–47	33,700	
October 28	at No. 22 Clemson	Memorial Stadium; Clemson, SC	L 10–44	71,335	
November 4	Duke	Groves Stadium; Winston-Salem, NC (rivalry)	L 35–52	18,600	
November 11	Tulsa*	Groves Stadium; Winston-Salem, NC	W 29–17	27,100	
November 18	at Georgia Tech	Bobby Dodd Stadium; Atlanta, GA	L 14–43	26,114	
*Non-conference game; Rankings from AP Poll released prior to the game

== Team leaders ==
Category	Team Leader	Att/Cth	Yds
Passing	Phil Barnhill	182/377	2,454
Rushing	Anthony Williams	119	430
Receiving	Ricky Proehl	65	1,053
