= 1989 NC State Wolfpack football team =

American college football season

1989 NC State Wolfpack football

Copper Bowl, L 10–17 vs. Arizona
- Conference: Atlantic Coast Conference
- Record: 7–5 (4–3 ACC)
- Head coach: Dick Sheridan (4th season)
- Home stadium: Carter Stadium

1989 Atlantic Coast Conference football standings
	Conf.					Overall
Team	W		L		T	W		L		T
No. 18 Virginia +	6	–	1	–	0	10	–	3	–	0
Duke +	6	–	1	–	0	8	–	4	–	0
No. 12 Clemson	5	–	2	–	0	10	–	2	–	0
Georgia Tech	4	–	3	–	0	7	–	4	–	0
NC State	4	–	3	–	0	7	–	5	–	0
Maryland	2	–	5	–	0	3	–	7	–	1
Wake Forest	1	–	6	–	0	2	–	8	–	1
North Carolina	0	–	7	–	0	1	–	10	–	0
+ – Conference co-champions; Rankings from AP Poll

The 1989 NC State Wolfpack football team represented North Carolina State University during the 1989 NCAA Division I-A football season. The team's head coach was Dick Sheridan. NC State has been a member of the Atlantic Coast Conference (ACC) since the league's inception in 1953. The Wolfpack played its home games in 1989 at Carter–Finley Stadium in Raleigh, North Carolina, which has been NC State football's home stadium since 1966.

== Schedule ==
Date	Time	Opponent	Rank	Site	TV	Result	Attendance	Source
September 2		Maryland	No. 24	Carter–Finley Stadium; Raleigh, NC		W 10–6	41,780	
September 9		Georgia Tech	No. 25	Carter–Finley Stadium; Raleigh, NC	Raycom	W 38–28	40,800	
September 16		at Wake Forest	No. 19	Groves Stadium; Winston-Salem, NC (rivalry)		W 27–17	25,250	
September 23		North Carolina	No. 18	Carter–Finley Stadium; Raleigh, NC (rivalry)		W 40–6	57,200	
September 30		Kent State*	No. 15	Carter–Finley Stadium; Raleigh, NC		W 42–22	35,400	
October 7		Middle Tennessee*	No. 14	Carter–Finley Stadium; Raleigh, NC		W 35–14	41,200	
October 21	4:00 p.m.	at Clemson	No. 12	Memorial Stadium; Clemson, SC (Textile Bowl)	ESPN	L 10–30	81,569	
October 28	1:00 p.m.	at No. 25 South Carolina*	No. 20	Williams–Brice Stadium; Columbia, SC		W 20–10	74,248	
November 4		No. 24 Virginia	No. 18	Carter–Finley Stadium; Raleigh, NC		L 9–20	53,000	
November 11		at Duke	No. 22	Wallace Wade Stadium; Durham, NC (rivalry)		L 26–35	41,200	
November 18	1:00 p.m.	Virginia Tech*		Carter–Finley Stadium; Raleigh, NC		L 23–25	43,100	
December 31		vs. Arizona*		Arizona Stadium; Tucson, AZ (Copper Bowl)	TBS	L 10–17	37,237	
*Non-conference game; Rankings from AP Poll released prior to the game; All times are in Eastern time
