= 1989 Copper Bowl =

- 1st Copper Bowl
NC State Wolfpack	Arizona Wildcats
(7–4)	(7–4)
ACC	Pac-10
10	17
Head coach: Dick Sheridan	Head coach: Dick Tomey
	1	2	3	4	Total
NC State	0	7	3	0	10
Arizona	7	10	0	0	17
- Date: December 31, 1989
- Season: 1989
- Stadium: Arizona Stadium
- Location: Tucson, Arizona
- MVP: Shane Montgomery (QB, NC State) & Scott Geyer (DB, Arizona)
- Referee: Thomas Thamert (CIFOA)
- Attendance: 37,237

United States TV coverage
- Network: TBS
- Announcers: Bob Neal and Tim Foley

The 1989 Copper Bowl featured the NC State Wolfpack and the Arizona Wildcats.

Arizona scored first on a 37-yard touchdown pass from Ronald Veal to Olatide Ogundiditimi giving Arizona a 7–0 lead throughout the 1st quarter. In the second quarter, with NC State driving, Shane Montgomery's pass was intercepted by Scott Geyer and returned 85 yards for a touchdown, making it 14–0 Arizona. Montgomery later found Todd Varn in the end zone for a 4-yard touchdown pass cutting the lead to 14–7. Arizona took a 17–7 halftime lead on a 34-yard Gary Coston field goal. In the third quarter, a 43-yard Hartman field goal made the final score 17–10.

== Statistics ==
Statistics	NC State	Arizona
First downs	23	8
Rushing yards	88	50
Passing yards	222	80
Return yards	10	107
Total offense	310	130
Punts–average	7–37.7	10–41.7
Fumbles–lost	2–2	3–2
Penalties–yards	6–49	5–47
Possession time	38:06	21:54
