= 1989 Appalachian State Mountaineers football team =

American college football season

1989 Appalachian State Mountaineers football

NCAA Division I-AA First Round, L 21–24 vs. Middle Tennessee
- Conference: Southern Conference
- Record: 9–3 (5–2 SoCon)
- Head coach: Jerry Moore (1st season)
- Home stadium: Kidd Brewer Stadium

1989 Southern Conference football standings
	Conf.					Overall
Team	W		L		T	W		L		T
No. 2 Furman $^	7	–	0	–	0	12	–	2	–	0
No. 7 Appalachian State ^	5	–	2	–	0	9	–	3	–	0
Marshall	4	–	3	–	0	6	–	5	–	0
East Tennessee State	4	–	3	–	0	4	–	7	–	0
Chattanooga	2	–	4	–	1	3	–	7	–	1
Western Carolina	1	–	4	–	1	3	–	7	–	1
VMI	1	–	4	–	1	2	–	8	–	1
The Citadel	1	–	5	–	1	5	–	5	–	1
$ – Conference champion; ^ – NCAA Division I-AA playoff participant; Rankings from NCAA Division I-AA Football Committee poll

The 1989 Appalachian State Mountaineers football team was an American football team that represented Appalachian State University as a member of the Southern Conference (SoCon) during the 1989 NCAA Division I-AA football season. In their first year under head coach Jerry Moore, the Mountaineers compiled an overall record of 9–3 with a conference mark of 5–2. Appalachian State advanced to the NCAA Division I-AA Football Championship playoffs, where they lost to Middle Tennessee in the first round.

== Schedule ==
Date	Opponent	Rank	Site	Result	Attendance	Source
September 2	Gardner–Webb*		Kidd Brewer Stadium; Boone, NC	W 43–7	12,872	
September 9	at Wake Forest*		Groves Stadium; Winston-Salem, NC	W 15–10	30,200	
September 16	at The Citadel		Johnson Hagood Stadium; Charleston, SC	L 13–23	17,118	
September 23	No. 13 James Madison*	No. 20	Kidd Brewer Stadium; Boone, NC	W 20–13	10,060	
September 30	at East Tennessee State	No. 11	Memorial Center; Johnson City, TN	W 20–14	6,888	
October 7	VMI	No. 9	Kidd Brewer Stadium; Boone, NC	W 34–0	12,379	
October 14	at No. 5 Furman	No. 8	Paladin Stadium; Greenville, SC	L 6–31	13,435	
October 28	Chattanooga	No. 15	Kidd Brewer Stadium; Boone, NC	W 41–7	20,122	
November 4	No. 19 Marshall	No. 10	Kidd Brewer Stadium; Boone, NC (rivalry)	W 28–7	11,212	
November 11	Catawba*	No. 7	Kidd Brewer Stadium; Boone, NC	W 31–20	10,005	
November 18	at Western Carolina	No. 7	Whitmire Stadium; Cullowhee, NC (rivalry)	W 31–20	13,118	
November 25	at No. 10 Middle Tennessee*	No. 7	Johnny "Red" Floyd Stadium; Murfreesboro, TN (NCAA Division I-AA First Round)	L 21–24	5,000	
*Non-conference game; Rankings from NCAA Division I-AA Football Committee Poll released prior to the game
