= 1989 Virginia Cavaliers football team =

American college football season

1989 Virginia Cavaliers football

ACC co-champion

Florida Citrus Bowl, L 21–31 vs. Illinois
- Conference: Atlantic Coast Conference

Ranking
- Coaches: No. 15
- AP: No. 18
- Record: 10–3 (6–1 ACC)
- Head coach: George Welsh (8th season)
- Offensive coordinator: Gary Tranquill (3rd season)
- Defensive coordinator: Frank Spaziani (3rd season)
- Captains: Roy Brown; Shawn Moore; Ray Savage
- Home stadium: Scott Stadium

1989 Atlantic Coast Conference football standings
	Conf.					Overall
Team	W		L		T	W		L		T
No. 18 Virginia +	6	–	1	–	0	10	–	3	–	0
Duke +	6	–	1	–	0	8	–	4	–	0
No. 12 Clemson	5	–	2	–	0	10	–	2	–	0
Georgia Tech	4	–	3	–	0	7	–	4	–	0
NC State	4	–	3	–	0	7	–	5	–	0
Maryland	2	–	5	–	0	3	–	7	–	1
Wake Forest	1	–	6	–	0	2	–	8	–	1
North Carolina	0	–	7	–	0	1	–	10	–	0
+ – Conference co-champions; Rankings from AP Poll

The 1989 Virginia Cavaliers football team represented the University of Virginia in the 1989 NCAA Division I-A football season. They went 10–2 in the regular season and were champions of the Atlantic Coast Conference. They were invited to the 1990 Florida Citrus Bowl, where they were defeated by Illinois.

== Schedule ==
Date	Time	Opponent	Rank	Site	TV	Result	Attendance	Source
August 31	8:00 p.m.	vs. No. 2 Notre Dame*		Giants Stadium; East Rutherford, NJ (Kickoff Classic)	Raycom, WGN	L 13–36	77,323	
September 9	1:00 p.m.	at No. 12 Penn State*		Beaver Stadium; University Park, PA		W 14–6	85,956	
September 16	12:00 p.m.	at Georgia Tech		Bobby Dodd Stadium; Atlanta, GA	JPS	W 17–10	38,062	
September 23	7:00 p.m.	Duke		Scott Stadium; Charlottesville, VA		W 49–28	37,800	
September 30	7:00 p.m.	No. 19 {I-AA) William & Mary*		Scott Stadium; Charlottesville, VA		W 24–12	35,000	
October 7	2:30 p.m.	at No. 15 Clemson		Memorial Stadium; Clemson, SC	CBS	L 20–34	80,638	
October 14	1:00 p.m.	North Carolina		Scott Stadium; Charlottesville, VA (South's Oldest Rivalry)		W 50–17	34,600	
October 21	4:00 p.m.	Wake Forest		Scott Stadium; Charlottesville, VA		W 47–28	33,700	
October 28	1:00 p.m.	Louisville*^{†}		Scott Stadium; Charlottesville, VA		W 16–15	33,400	
November 4	12:30 p.m.	at No. 18 NC State	No. 24	Carter–Finley Stadium; Raleigh, NC	JPS	W 20–9	53,000	
November 11	1:00 p.m.	Virginia Tech*	No. 18	Scott Stadium; Charlottesville, VA (rivalry)		W 32–25	44,300	
November 18	4:00 p.m.	at Maryland	No. 16	Byrd Stadium; College Park, MD (rivalry)	ESPN	W 48–21	38,113	
January 1	1:35 p.m.	vs. No. 11 Illinois*	No. 15	Florida Citrus Bowl; Orlando, FL (Florida Citrus Bowl)	ABC	L 21–31	60,016	
*Non-conference game; ^{†}Homecoming; Rankings from AP Poll released prior to the game; All times are in Eastern time

== Personnel ==
1989 Virginia Cavaliers football team roster
Players
Coaches
Offense

Pos.	#	Name	Class
QB	19	Matt Blundin
OL	57	Roy Brown
RB	30	Don Bryant
OL	67	Paul Collins
TE	82	Mark Cooke
WR	83	Derek Dooley
WR	84	Tim Finkelston
RB	33	Nikki Fisher
RB		Durwin Greggs
RB		Terry Kirby	Fr
TE	86	Bruce McGonnigal
WR	87	Herman Moore	Jr
QB	12	Shawn Moore
OL		Tim Morris
OL		Tim O'Connor
OL	72	Ray Roberts	So
OL		Trevor Ryals
OL		Tim Samec
WR	13	Brian Satola
RB		Alvin Snead
RB		Gary Steele
OL		Jeff Tomlin
WR		Terrence Tomlin
RB	29	Marcus Wilson

Defense

Pos.	#	Name	Class
DB		David Brown
DL	90	Ron Carey
DB	31	Kevin Cook
DB	5	Tony Covington
DL	78	Joe Hall
DL	61	Billy Keys
DB	9	Tyrone Lewis
DB	16	Keith McMeans
DL		James Pearson
DL		Don Reynolds
DL		Ray Savage
DL		Chris Slade	Fr
DL		Chris Stearns
LB		Phil Thomas
LB		Elton Tolliver
DB		Jason Wallace
LB	45	Mike Williams
LB		Matt Woods

Special teams

Pos.	#	Name	Class
P		Ed Garno
P		Myron Martin
K	11	Jake McInerney

Head coach

- George Welsh

Coordinators/assistant coaches

Legend

- (C) Team captain
- (S) Suspended
- (I) Ineligible
- Injured
- Redshirt

Roster
