= 1989 The Citadel Bulldogs football team =

American college football season

1989 The Citadel Bulldogs football
- Conference: Southern Conference
- Record: 5–5–1 (1–5–1 SoCon)
- Head coach: Charlie Taaffe (3rd season)
- Defensive coordinator: Don Powers (1st season)
- Home stadium: Johnson Hagood Stadium

1989 Southern Conference football standings
	Conf.					Overall
Team	W		L		T	W		L		T
No. 2 Furman $^	7	–	0	–	0	12	–	2	–	0
No. 7 Appalachian State ^	5	–	2	–	0	9	–	3	–	0
Marshall	4	–	3	–	0	6	–	5	–	0
East Tennessee State	4	–	3	–	0	4	–	7	–	0
Chattanooga	2	–	4	–	1	3	–	7	–	1
Western Carolina	1	–	4	–	1	3	–	7	–	1
VMI	1	–	4	–	1	2	–	8	–	1
The Citadel	1	–	5	–	1	5	–	5	–	1
$ – Conference champion; ^ – NCAA Division I-AA playoff participant; Rankings from NCAA Division I-AA Football Committee poll

The 1989 The Citadel Bulldogs football team represented The Citadel, The Military College of South Carolina in the 1989 NCAA Division I-AA football season. Charlie Taaffe served as head coach for the third season. The Bulldogs played as members of the Southern Conference and played home games at Johnson Hagood Stadium. The 1989 season was affected by Hurricane Hugo, which damaged Johnson Hagood Stadium as the eye of the storm passed over Charleston harbor before making its way inland. As a result, The Citadel played two "home" games at Williams–Brice Stadium, on the campus of the University of South Carolina in Columbia, South Carolina. The hurricane struck on September 22, 1989, and the Bulldogs did not play a game again in their home stadium until November 4, 1989.

== Schedule ==
Date	Opponent	Rank	Site	Result	Attendance	Source
September 9	Wofford*		Johnson Hagood Stadium; Charleston, SC (rivalry)	W 42–21	17,768	
September 16	Appalachian State		Johnson Hagood Stadium; Charleston, SC	W 23–13	17,118	
September 23	at Navy*	No. T–11	Navy–Marine Corps Memorial Stadium; Annapolis, MD	W 14–10	20,057	
September 30	South Carolina State*	No. 7	Williams–Brice Stadium; Columbia, SC	W 31–20	21,853	
October 8	Western Carolina	No. 7	Williams–Brice Stadium; Columbia, SC	T 22–22	14,777	
October 14	at No. T–20 Marshall	No. 7	Fairfield Stadium; Huntington, WV	L 17–40	13,927	
October 21	at Chattanooga	No. T–15	Chamberlain Field; Chattanooga, TN	L 9–17	7,921	
October 28	at East Tennessee State		Memorial Center; Johnson City, TN	L 33–35	6,784	
November 4	Samford*		Johnson Hagood Stadium; Charleston, SC	W 35–16	15,214	
November 11	at VMI		Alumni Memorial Field; Lexington, VA (Military Classic of the South)	L 10–20	8,125	
November 18	No. 2 Furman^{†}		Johnson Hagood Stadium; Charleston, SC (rivalry)	L 9–44	20,357	
*Non-conference game; ^{†}Homecoming; Rankings from NCAA Division I-AA Football Committee Poll released prior to the game
