= 1989 Murray State Racers football team =

American college football season

1989 Murray State Racers football
- Conference: Ohio Valley Conference
- Record: 6–4–1 (3–3 OVC)
- Head coach: Mike Mahoney (3rd season)
- Home stadium: Roy Stewart Stadium

1989 Ohio Valley Conference football standings
	Conf.					Overall
Team	W		L		T	W		L		T
No. T–10 Middle Tennessee $^	6	–	0	–	0	9	–	4	–	0
No. 12 Eastern Kentucky ^	5	–	1	–	0	9	–	3	–	0
Murray State	3	–	3	–	0	6	–	4	–	1
Tennessee State	3	–	3	–	0	5	–	5	–	1
Tennessee Tech	3	–	3	–	0	5	–	5	–	0
Austin Peay	1	–	5	–	0	1	–	10	–	0
Morehead State	0	–	6	–	0	1	–	10	–	0
$ – Conference champion; ^ – NCAA Division I-AA playoff participant; Records adjusted for Morehead State forfeit of conference victories over Austin Peay and Tennessee Tech, and non-conference victories over Kentucky State and Samford; Rankings from NCAA Division I-AA Football Committee poll

The 1989 Murray State Racers football team represented Murray State University during the 1989 NCAA Division I-AA football season as a member of the Ohio Valley Conference (OVC). Led by third-year head coach Mike Mahoney, the Racers compiled an overall record of 6–4–1, with a mark of 3–3 in conference play, and finished tied for third in the OVC.

== Schedule ==
Date	Opponent	Rank	Site	Result	Attendance	Source
September 2	at Tennessee–Martin*		Pacer Stadium; Martin, TN	W 24–3		
September 9	Western Kentucky*		Roy Stewart Stadium; Murray, KY (rivalry)	W 17–14	8,575	
September 16	at North Texas*		Fouts Field; Denton, TX	L 14–28	18,059	
September 23	Southern Illinois*	No. T–15	Roy Stewart Stadium; Murray, KY	W 24–11	6,850	
September 30	at Tennessee Tech	No. 10	Tucker Stadium; Cookeville, TN	L 20–21		
October 7	Morehead State^{†}		Roy Stewart Stadium; Murray, KY	W 27–13	10,850	
October 14	vs. Tennessee State	No. 19	Liberty Bowl Memorial Stadium; Memphis, TN	W 27–24	8,879	
October 21	Akron*	No. 17	Roy Stewart Stadium; Murray, KY	T 31–31	5,390	
October 28	at No. 1 Eastern Kentucky	No. 16	Hanger Field; Richmond, KY	L 36–38		
November 11	at No. 14 Middle Tennessee	No. T–11	Johnny "Red" Floyd Stadium; Murfreesboro, TN	L 15–32		
November 18	Austin Peay		Roy Stewart Stadium; Murray, KY	W 49–43	2,506	
*Non-conference game; ^{†}Homecoming; Rankings from NCAA Division I-AA Football Committee Poll released prior to the game
