= 1989 Western Carolina Catamounts football team =

American college football season

1989 Western Carolina Catamounts football
- Conference: Southern Conference
- Record: 3–7–1 (1–4–1 SoCon)
- Head coach: Dale Strahm (1st season)
- Home stadium: E. J. Whitmire Stadium

1989 Southern Conference football standings
	Conf.					Overall
Team	W		L		T	W		L		T
No. 2 Furman $^	7	–	0	–	0	12	–	2	–	0
No. 7 Appalachian State ^	5	–	2	–	0	9	–	3	–	0
Marshall	4	–	3	–	0	6	–	5	–	0
East Tennessee State	4	–	3	–	0	4	–	7	–	0
Chattanooga	2	–	4	–	1	3	–	7	–	1
Western Carolina	1	–	4	–	1	3	–	7	–	1
VMI	1	–	4	–	1	2	–	8	–	1
The Citadel	1	–	5	–	1	5	–	5	–	1
$ – Conference champion; ^ – NCAA Division I-AA playoff participant; Rankings from NCAA Division I-AA Football Committee poll

The 1989 Western Carolina Catamounts team was an American football team that represented Western Carolina University as a member of the Southern Conference (SoCon) during the 1989 NCAA Division I-AA football season. In their first year under head coach Dale Strahm, the team compiled an overall record of 3–7–1, with a mark of 1–4–1 in conference play, and finished tied for sixth in the SoCon.

== Schedule ==
Date	Opponent	Site	Result	Attendance	Source
September 2	at Eastern Kentucky*	Hanger Field; Richmond, KY	L 13–31	14,800	
September 9	Lenoir–Rhyne*	Whitmire Stadium; Cullowhee, NC	W 21–17	9,472	
September 16	Chattanooga	Whitmire Stadium; Cullowhee, NC	W 26–20	7,435	
September 23	at East Tennessee State	Memorial Center; Johnson City, TN	L 11–30	5,268	
September 30	Mars Hill*	Whitmire Stadium; Cullowhee, NC	W 42–0		
October 8	at No. 7 The Citadel	Williams–Brice Stadium; Columbia, SC	T 22–22	14,777	
October 21	at No. 24 (I-A) South Carolina*	Williams–Brice Stadium; Columbia, SC	L 3–24	62,000	
October 28	No. 3 Furman	Whitmire Stadium; Cullowhee, NC	L 3–17	13,227	
November 4	at Georgia Tech*	Bobby Dodd Stadium; Atlanta, GA	L 7–34	28,821	
November 11	at Marshall	Fairfield Stadium; Huntington, WV	L 22–35	10,546	
November 18	No. 7 Appalachian State	Whitmire Stadium; Cullowhee, NC (rivalry)	L 20–31	13,118	
*Non-conference game; Rankings from NCAA Division I-AA Football Committee Poll released prior to the game
