= 1989 Duke Blue Devils football team =

American college football season

1989 Duke Blue Devils football

ACC co-champion

All-American Bowl, L 21–49 vs. Texas Tech
- Conference: Atlantic Coast Conference
- Record: 8–4 (6–1 ACC)
- Head coach: Steve Spurrier (3rd season)
- Offensive scheme: Fun and gun
- Co-defensive coordinators: Jim Collins (1st season); Bob Sanders (1st season)
- Base defense: 4–3
- MVP: Clarkston Hines
- Captains: Carey Metts; John Howell
- Home stadium: Wallace Wade Stadium

1989 Atlantic Coast Conference football standings
	Conf.					Overall
Team	W		L		T	W		L		T
No. 18 Virginia +	6	–	1	–	0	10	–	3	–	0
Duke +	6	–	1	–	0	8	–	4	–	0
No. 12 Clemson	5	–	2	–	0	10	–	2	–	0
Georgia Tech	4	–	3	–	0	7	–	4	–	0
NC State	4	–	3	–	0	7	–	5	–	0
Maryland	2	–	5	–	0	3	–	7	–	1
Wake Forest	1	–	6	–	0	2	–	8	–	1
North Carolina	0	–	7	–	0	1	–	10	–	0
+ – Conference co-champions; Rankings from AP Poll

The 1989 Duke Blue Devils football team represented Duke University as a member of the Atlantic Coast Conference (ACC) during the 1989 NCAA Division I-A football season. Led by third-year head coach Steve Spurrier, the Blue Devils compiled an overall record of 8–4 with a mark of 6–1 in conference play. Duke shared the 1989 ACC title with Virginia, their first since they won the conference outright in 1962. It would be their last conference title until they won the ACC Championship Game in 2025. Duke played home games at Wallace Wade Stadium in Durham, North Carolina.

== Schedule ==
Date	Time	Opponent	Rank	Site	TV	Result	Attendance	Source
September 2	7:00 p.m.	at South Carolina*		Williams–Brice Stadium; Columbia, SC		L 21–27	74,232	
September 9		Northwestern*		Wallace Wade Stadium; Durham, NC		W 41–31	15,220	
September 16		at No. 17 Tennessee*		Neyland Stadium; Knoxville, TN		L 6–28	93,659	
September 23		at Virginia		Scott Stadium; Charlottesville, VA		L 28–49	37,800	
September 30	12:00 p.m.	No. 7 Clemson		Wallace Wade Stadium; Durham, NC	JPS	W 21–17	22,600	
October 7		Army*		Wallace Wade Stadium; Durham, NC		W 35–29	25,200	
October 21		at Maryland		Byrd Stadium; College Park, MD		W 46–25	38,617	
October 28		Georgia Tech^{†}		Wallace Wade Stadium; Durham, NC		W 30–19	38,621	
November 4		at Wake Forest		Groves Stadium; Winston-Salem, NC (rivalry)		W 52–35	18,600	
November 11		No. 22 NC State		Wallace Wade Stadium; Durham, NC (rivalry)		W 35–26	41,200	
November 18	12:00 p.m.	at North Carolina	No. 25	Kenan Memorial Stadium; Chapel Hill, NC (Victory Bell)	JPS	W 41–0	46,000	
December 28	8:00 p.m.	vs. No. 24 Texas Tech*	No. 20	Legion Field; Birmingham, AL (All-American Bowl)	ESPN	L 21–49	47,750	
*Non-conference game; ^{†}Homecoming; Rankings from AP Poll released prior to the game; All times are in Eastern time

== Personnel ==
1989 Duke Blue Devils football team roster
Players
Coaches
Offense

Pos.	#	Name	Class
RB		Randy Cuthbert
WR		Clarkston Hines
OL		Walter Perez

Defense

Pos.	#	Name	Class
LB		Brad Sherrod	Fr

Special teams

Pos.	#	Name	Class

Head coach

- Steve Spurrier

Coordinators/assistant coaches

- Rod Broadway (DL)

Legend

- (C) Team captain
- (S) Suspended
- (I) Ineligible
- Injured
- Redshirt
