= 1989 Morehead State Eagles football team =

American college football season

1989 Morehead State Eagles football
- Conference: Ohio Valley Conference
- Record: 1–10, 4 wins forfeited (0–6 OVC, 2 wins forfeited)
- Head coach: Bill Baldridge (6th season)
- Home stadium: Jayne Stadium

1989 Ohio Valley Conference football standings
	Conf.					Overall
Team	W		L		T	W		L		T
No. T–10 Middle Tennessee $^	6	–	0	–	0	9	–	4	–	0
No. 12 Eastern Kentucky ^	5	–	1	–	0	9	–	3	–	0
Murray State	3	–	3	–	0	6	–	4	–	1
Tennessee State	3	–	3	–	0	5	–	5	–	1
Tennessee Tech	3	–	3	–	0	5	–	5	–	0
Austin Peay	1	–	5	–	0	1	–	10	–	0
Morehead State	0	–	6	–	0	1	–	10	–	0
$ – Conference champion; ^ – NCAA Division I-AA playoff participant; Records adjusted for Morehead State forfeit of conference victories over Austin Peay and Tennessee Tech, and non-conference victories over Kentucky State and Samford; Rankings from NCAA Division I-AA Football Committee poll

The 1989 Morehead State Eagles football team represented Morehead State University as a member of the Ohio Valley Conference (OVC) during the 1989 NCAA Division I-AA football season. Led by sixth-year head coach Bill Baldridge, the Eagles compiled an overall record of 1–10, with a mark of 0–6 in conference play, and finished seventh in the OVC. Morehead was found to have played an ineligible player, and as a result forfeited four of their victories.

== Schedule ==
Date	Opponent	Site	Result	Attendance	Source
September 9	at No. 11 Marshall*	Fairfield Stadium; Huntington, WV	L 7–30	18,153	
September 16	Kentucky State*	Jayne Stadium; Morehead, KY	L 38–0 (forfeit)		
September 23	Liberty*	Jayne Stadium; Morehead, KY	L 14–34	5,200	
September 30	at Samford*	Seibert Stadium; Homewood, AL	L 35–28 (forfeit)	2,430	
October 7	at Murray State	Roy Stewart Stadium; Murray, KY	L 13–27	10,850	
October 14	Middle Tennessee	Jayne Stadium; Morehead, KY	L 3–34		
October 21	at Tennessee State	Hale Stadium; Nashville, TN	L 14–23	4,187	
October 28	at Austin Peay	Municipal Stadium; Clarksville, TN	L 23–22 (forfeit)		
November 4	Tennessee Tech	Jayne Stadium; Morehead, KY	L 14–8 (forfeit)		
November 11	at Cincinnati*	Nippert Stadium; Cincinnati, OH	W 13–10		
November 18	No. 10 Eastern Kentucky	Jayne Stadium; Morehead, KY (rivalry)	L 31–38 ^{3OT}		
*Non-conference game; Rankings from NCAA Division I-AA Football Committee Poll released prior to the game
