= 1989 Middle Tennessee Blue Raiders football team =

American college football season

1989 Middle Tennessee Blue Raiders football

OVC champion

NCAA Division I-AA Quarterfinal, L 3–45 at Georgia Southern
- Conference: Ohio Valley Conference
- Record: 9–4 (6–0 OVC)
- Head coach: Boots Donnelly (11th season)
- Home stadium: Johnny "Red" Floyd Stadium

1989 Ohio Valley Conference football standings
| | Conf. | | | | | Overall |
| Team | W | | L | | T | W | | L | | T |
|---|---|---|---|---|---|---|---|---|---|---|
| No. T–10 Middle Tennessee $^ | 6 | – | 0 | – | 0 | 9 | – | 4 | – | 0 |
| No. 12 Eastern Kentucky ^ | 5 | – | 1 | – | 0 | 9 | – | 3 | – | 0 |
| Murray State | 3 | – | 3 | – | 0 | 6 | – | 4 | – | 1 |
| Tennessee State | 3 | – | 3 | – | 0 | 5 | – | 5 | – | 1 |
| Tennessee Tech | 3 | – | 3 | – | 0 | 5 | – | 5 | – | 0 |
| Austin Peay | 1 | – | 5 | – | 0 | 1 | – | 10 | – | 0 |
| Morehead State | 0 | – | 6 | – | 0 | 1 | – | 10 | – | 0 |
$ – Conference champion; ^ – NCAA Division I-AA playoff participant; Records adjusted for Morehead State forfeit of conference victories over Austin Peay and Tennessee Tech, and non-conference victories over Kentucky State and Samford; Rankings from NCAA Division I-AA Football Committee poll

The 1989 Middle Tennessee Blue Raiders football team represented Middle Tennessee State University in the 1989 NCAA Division I-AA football season

== Schedule ==
| Date | Opponent | Rank | Site | Result | Attendance | Source |
|---|---|---|---|---|---|---|
| September 2 | at Tennessee State | No. 18 | Vanderbilt Stadium; Nashville, TN | W 36–7 | 29,500 | |
| September 9 | at East Tennessee State* | No. 18 | Memorial Center; Johnson City, TN | W 41–6 | 14,700 | |
| September 16 | at Western Kentucky* | No. 18 | L. T. Smith Stadium; Bowling Green, KY | L 16–31 | 14,700 | |
| September 21 | at No. 3 Georgia Southern* | | Paulson Stadium; Statesboro, GA | L 0–26 | 16,449 | |
| September 30 | Chattanooga* | | Johnny "Red" Floyd Stadium; Murfreesboro, TN | W 24–7 | 3,500 | |
| October 7 | at NC State* | | Carter–Finley Stadium; Raleigh, NC | L 14–35 | 41,200 | |
| October 14 | at Morehead State | | Jayne Stadium; Morehead, KY | W 34–3 | | |
| October 21 | Austin Peay | | Johnny "Red" Floyd Stadium; Murfreesboro, TN | W 46–7 | | |
| November 4 | No. 1 Eastern Kentucky | | Johnny "Red" Floyd Stadium; Murfreesboro, TN | W 24–19 | 10,000 | |
| November 11 | No. 11 Murray State | No. 14 | Johnny "Red" Floyd Stadium; Murfreesboro, TN | W 32–15 | | |
| November 18 | at Tennessee Tech | No. 12 | Tucker Stadium; Cookeville, TN | W 24–3 | 6,555 | |
| November 25 | No. 7 Appalachian State* | No. 10 | Johnny "Red" Floyd Stadium; Murfreesboro, TN (NCAA Division I-AA First Round) | W 24–21 | 5,000 | |
| December 2 | at No. 1 Georgia Southern* | No. 10 | Paulson Stadium; Statesboro, GA (NCAA Division I-AA Quarterfinal) | L 3–45 | 11,272 | |
*Non-conference game; Rankings from NCAA Division I-AA Football Committee Poll released prior to the game
