= 1989 Austin Peay Governors football team =

American college football season

1989 Austin Peay Governors football
- Conference: Ohio Valley Conference
- Record: 1–10 (1–5 OVC)
- Head coach: Paul Brewster (2nd season)
- Home stadium: Municipal Stadium

1989 Ohio Valley Conference football standings
	Conf.					Overall
Team	W		L		T	W		L		T
No. T–10 Middle Tennessee $^	6	–	0	–	0	9	–	4	–	0
No. 12 Eastern Kentucky ^	5	–	1	–	0	9	–	3	–	0
Murray State	3	–	3	–	0	6	–	4	–	1
Tennessee State	3	–	3	–	0	5	–	5	–	1
Tennessee Tech	3	–	3	–	0	5	–	5	–	0
Austin Peay	1	–	5	–	0	1	–	10	–	0
Morehead State	0	–	6	–	0	1	–	10	–	0
$ – Conference champion; ^ – NCAA Division I-AA playoff participant; Records adjusted for Morehead State forfeit of conference victories over Austin Peay and Tennessee Tech, and non-conference victories over Kentucky State and Samford; Rankings from NCAA Division I-AA Football Committee poll

The 1989 Austin Peay Governors football team represented Austin Peay State University as a member of the Ohio Valley Conference (OVC) during the 1989 NCAA Division I-AA football season. Led by second-year head coach Paul Brewster, the Governors compiled an overall record of 1–10, with a mark of 1–5 in conference play, and finished sixth in the OVC.

== Schedule ==
Date	Opponent	Site	Result	Attendance	Source
September 2	Eastern Illinois*	Municipal Stadium; Clarksville, TN	L 0–36	2,119	
September 9	at Tennessee–Martin*	Pacer Stadium; Martin, TN	L 0–21	3,325	
September 16	at Indiana State*	Memorial Stadium; Terre Haute, IN	L 15–42		
September 23	No. T–5 Southwest Missouri State*	Municipal Stadium; Clarksville, TN	L 3–41	2,493	
September 30	at No. T–20 Western Kentucky*	L. T. Smith Stadium; Bowling Green, KY	L 0–49	4,200	
October 7	at No. 1 Eastern Kentucky	Hanger Field; Richmond, KY	L 20–45		
October 21	at Middle Tennessee	Johnny "Red" Floyd Stadium; Murfreesboro, TN	L 7–46		
October 28	Morehead State	Municipal Stadium; Clarksville, TN	W 22–23 (forfeit win)		
November 4	at Tennessee State	Hale Stadium; Nashville, TN	L 10–38	8,679	
November 11	Tennessee Tech	Municipal Stadium; Clarksville, TN	L 15–17		
November 18	at Murray State	Roy Stewart Stadium; Murray, KY	L 43–49	2,506	
*Non-conference game; Rankings from NCAA Division I-AA Football Committee Poll released prior to the game
