= 1989 Georgia Tech Yellow Jackets football team =

American college football season

1989 Georgia Tech Yellow Jackets football
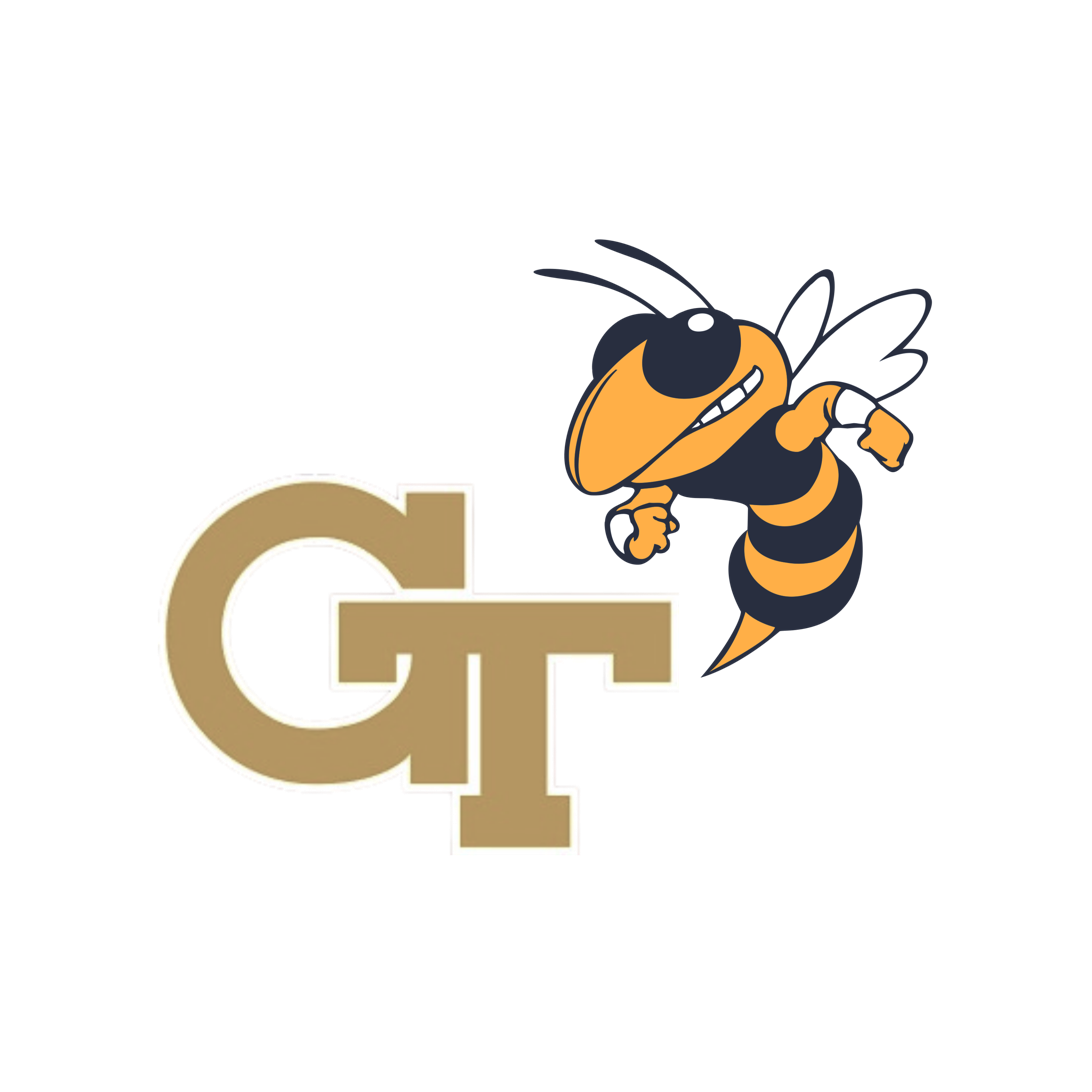
- Conference: Atlantic Coast Conference
- Record: 7–4 (4–3 ACC)
- Head coach: Bobby Ross (3rd season)
- Offensive coordinator: Ralph Friedgen (3rd season)
- Defensive coordinator: George O'Leary (3rd season)
- Captains: Jerry Mays; Eric Thomas
- Home stadium: Bobby Dodd Stadium

1989 Atlantic Coast Conference football standings
	Conf.					Overall
Team	W		L		T	W		L		T
No. 18 Virginia +	6	–	1	–	0	10	–	3	–	0
Duke +	6	–	1	–	0	8	–	4	–	0
No. 12 Clemson	5	–	2	–	0	10	–	2	–	0
Georgia Tech	4	–	3	–	0	7	–	4	–	0
NC State	4	–	3	–	0	7	–	5	–	0
Maryland	2	–	5	–	0	3	–	7	–	1
Wake Forest	1	–	6	–	0	2	–	8	–	1
North Carolina	0	–	7	–	0	1	–	10	–	0
+ – Conference co-champions; Rankings from AP Poll

The 1989 Georgia Tech Yellow Jackets football team represented the Georgia Institute of Technology during the 1989 NCAA Division I-A football season. The Yellow Jackets were led by third-year head coach Bobby Ross, and played their home games at Bobby Dodd Stadium in Atlanta, Georgia. They competed as members of the Atlantic Coast Conference, finishing tied for fourth. Despite winning seven of their last eight games and ending on a four-game winning streak, they were not invited to a bowl game.

== Schedule ==
Date	Opponent	Site	TV	Result	Attendance	Source
September 9	at No. 25 NC State	Carter–Finley Stadium; Raleigh, NC	Raycom	L 28–38	40,800	
September 16	Virginia	Bobby Dodd Stadium; Atlanta, GA	Raycom	L 10–17	38,062	
September 23	at South Carolina*	Williams–Brice Stadium; Columbia, SC		L 10–21	70,018	
October 7	Maryland	Bobby Dodd Stadium; Atlanta, GA		W 28–24	32,062	
October 14	at No. 14 Clemson	Memorial Stadium; Clemson, SC (rivalry)		W 30–14	81,550	
October 21	North Carolina^{†}	Bobby Dodd Stadium; Atlanta, GA		W 17–14	41,114	
October 28	at Duke	Wallace Wade Stadium; Durham, NC		L 19–30	38,621	
November 4	Western Carolina*	Bobby Dodd Stadium; Atlanta, GA		W 34–7	28,821	
November 18	Wake Forest	Bobby Dodd Stadium; Atlanta, GA	Raycom	W 43–14	26,114	
November 25	Boston College*	Bobby Dodd Stadium; Atlanta, GA		W 13–12	28,221	
December 2	Georgia*	Bobby Dodd Stadium; Atlanta, GA (Clean, Old-Fashioned Hate)		W 33–22	46,064	
*Non-conference game; ^{†}Homecoming; Rankings from AP Poll released prior to the game

== Roster ==
1989 Georgia Tech Yellow Jackets football team roster
Players			Coaches
Offense: Pos. / # / Name / Class; QB / / Shawn Jones / Fr	Defense: Pos. / # / Name / Class; LB / / Marco Coleman / Fr	Special teams: Pos. / # / Name / Class	Head coach: Bobby Ross; Coordinators/assistant coaches: Ralph Friedgen – Offensive coordinator/quarterbacks; Danny Smith – Running backs; Jimmy Robinson – Wide receivers; Mark Hendrickson – Tight ends/special teams; Pat Watson – Offensive line; George O'Leary – Defensive coordinator/defensive line; Brian Baker – Outside linebacker; Chuck Bresnahan – Inside linebackers; Chuck Priefer – Defensive backs; Legend: (C) Team captain; (S) Suspended; (I) Ineligible; Injured; Redshirt
