= 1989 East Tennessee State Buccaneers football team =

American college football season

1989 East Tennessee State Buccaneers football
- Conference: Southern Conference
- Record: 4–7 (4–3 SoCon)
- Head coach: Don Riley (2nd season)
- Home stadium: Memorial Center

1989 Southern Conference football standings
	Conf.					Overall
Team	W		L		T	W		L		T
No. 2 Furman $^	7	–	0	–	0	12	–	2	–	0
No. 7 Appalachian State ^	5	–	2	–	0	9	–	3	–	0
Marshall	4	–	3	–	0	6	–	5	–	0
East Tennessee State	4	–	3	–	0	4	–	7	–	0
Chattanooga	2	–	4	–	1	3	–	7	–	1
Western Carolina	1	–	4	–	1	3	–	7	–	1
VMI	1	–	4	–	1	2	–	8	–	1
The Citadel	1	–	5	–	1	5	–	5	–	1
$ – Conference champion; ^ – NCAA Division I-AA playoff participant; Rankings from NCAA Division I-AA Football Committee poll

The 1989 East Tennessee State Buccaneers football team was an American football team that represented East Tennessee State University as a member of the Southern Conference (SoCon) during the 1989 NCAA Division I-AA football season. Led by second-year head coach Don Riley, the Buccaneers compiled and overall record of 4–7, with a mark of 4–3 in conference play, and finished tied for third in the SoCon.

== Schedule ==
Date	Opponent	Site	Result	Attendance	Source
September 2	at VMI	Alumni Memorial Field; Lexington, VA	W 17–16	5,100	
September 9	No. 18 Middle Tennessee*	Memorial Center; Johnson City, TN	L 6–41	14,700	
September 16	at No. 11 Marshall	Fairfield Stadium; Huntington, WV	L 21–31	11,471	
September 23	Western Carolina	Memorial Center; Johnson City, TN	W 30–11	5,268	
September 30	No. 11 Appalachian State	Memorial Center; Johnson City, TN	L 14–20	6,888	
October 7	at UCF*	Florida Citrus Bowl; Orlando, FL	L 0–34	12,072	
October 14	Chattanooga	Memorial Center; Johnson City, TN	W 24–23	6,827	
October 28	The Citadel	Memorial Center; Johnson City, TN	W 35–33	6,784	
November 4	at No. 17 William & Mary*	Cary Field; Williamsburg, VA	L 28–34		
November 11	at No. 2 Furman	Paladin Stadium; Greenville, SC	L 20–44	17,001	
November 18	at Samford*	Seibert Stadium; Homewood, AL	L 23–38		
*Non-conference game; Rankings from NCAA Division I-AA Football Committee Poll released prior to the game
