= 1989 Marshall Thundering Herd football team =

American college football season

1989 Marshall Thundering Herd football
- Conference: Southern Conference
- Record: 6–5 (4–3 SoCon)
- Head coach: George Chaump (4th season)
- Defensive coordinator: Dave Ritchie (1st season)
- Captain: Game captains
- Home stadium: Fairfield Stadium

1989 Southern Conference football standings
| | Conf. | | | | | Overall |
| Team | W | | L | | T | W | | L | | T |
|---|---|---|---|---|---|---|---|---|---|---|
| No. 2 Furman $^ | 7 | – | 0 | – | 0 | 12 | – | 2 | – | 0 |
| No. 7 Appalachian State ^ | 5 | – | 2 | – | 0 | 9 | – | 3 | – | 0 |
| Marshall | 4 | – | 3 | – | 0 | 6 | – | 5 | – | 0 |
| East Tennessee State | 4 | – | 3 | – | 0 | 4 | – | 7 | – | 0 |
| Chattanooga | 2 | – | 4 | – | 1 | 3 | – | 7 | – | 1 |
| Western Carolina | 1 | – | 4 | – | 1 | 3 | – | 7 | – | 1 |
| VMI | 1 | – | 4 | – | 1 | 2 | – | 8 | – | 1 |
| The Citadel | 1 | – | 5 | – | 1 | 5 | – | 5 | – | 1 |
$ – Conference champion; ^ – NCAA Division I-AA playoff participant; Rankings from NCAA Division I-AA Football Committee poll

The 1989 Marshall Thundering Herd football team was an American football team that represented Marshall University as a member of the Southern Conference (SoCon) during the 1989 NCAA Division I-AA football season. Led by George Chaump in his fourth and final season as head coach, the Thundering Herd compiled an overall record of 6–5 record with a mark of 4–3 in conference play, tying for third place in the SoCon. The played home games at Fairfield Stadium in Huntington, West Virginia.

After the season concluded, George Chaump left Marshall to become the head coach at Navy.

== Schedule ==
| Date | Opponent | Rank | Site | Result | Attendance | Source |
|---|---|---|---|---|---|---|
| September 2 | Catawba* | No. 11 | Fairfield Stadium; Huntington, WV | W 48–0 | 16,041 | |
| September 9 | Morehead State* | No. 11 | Fairfield Stadium; Huntington, WV | W 30–7 | 18,153 | |
| September 16 | East Tennessee State | No. 11 | Fairfield Stadium; Huntington, WV | W 31–21 | 11,471 | |
| September 23 | at Chattanooga | No. 7 | Chamberlain Field; Chattanooga, TN | L 0–14 | 9,523 | |
| October 7 | at No. 4T Furman | No. 16 | Paladin Stadium; Greenville, SC | L 13–34 | 11,418 | |
| October 14 | No. 7 The Citadel | No. T–20 | Fairfield Stadium; Huntington, WV | W 40–17 | 13,927 | |
| October 21 | at No. 1 Eastern Kentucky* | No. 13 | Hanger Field; Richmond, KY | L 23–38 | | |
| October 28 | VMI^{†} | | Fairfield Stadium; Huntington, WV | W 40–10 | 15,807 | |
| November 4 | at No. 10 Appalachian State | No. 19 | Kidd Brewer Stadium; Boone, NC (rivalry) | L 7–28 | 11,212 | |
| November 11 | Western Carolina | | Fairfield Stadium; Huntington, WV | W 35–22 | 10,546 | |
| November 18 | at No. 1 Georgia Southern* | | Paulson Stadium; Statesboro, GA | L 31–63 | 16,323 | |
*Non-conference game; ^{†}Homecoming; Rankings from NCAA Division I-AA Football Committee Poll released prior to the game
