= 1989 Gator Bowl (December) =

1989 Mazda Gator Bowl
- 45th Gator Bowl
Clemson Tigers	West Virginia Mountaineers
(9–2)	(8–2–1)
ACC	Independent
27	7
Head coach: Danny Ford	Head coach: Don Nehlen
AP / Coaches; 14 / 13	AP / Coaches; 17 / 17
	1	2	3	4	Total
Clemson	0	10	0	17	27
West Virginia	7	0	0	0	7
- Date: December 30, 1989
- Season: 1989
- Stadium: Gator Bowl
- Location: Jacksonville, Florida
- MVP: Levon Kirkland, LB, Clemson; Mike Fox, DT, West Virginia
- Referee: Terry Monk (SICOA)
- Attendance: 82,911

United States TV coverage
- Network: ESPN
- Announcers: Ron Franklin, Kevin Kiley, and Chris Fowler

The 1989 Gator Bowl was held on December 30, 1989, at the Gator Bowl Stadium in Jacksonville, Florida. The 14th-ranked Clemson Tigers defeated the 17th-ranked West Virginia Mountaineers by a score of 27–7. For sponsorship reasons, the game was officially known as the Mazda Gator Bowl.

== Game summary ==
The scoring was opened by West Virginia in the first quarter, as they scored on a 12-yard pass. The PAT was good and the Mountaineers led 7–0. Clemson retaliated in the second quarter, though, as they converted a 27-yard field goal and then a 1-yard touchdown run. The Tigers led at halftime, 10–7. The third quarter saw no scoring, and the fourth quarter's scoring was opened by Clemson, as they scored on a 4-yard rush to lead 17–7. The Tigers defense got them six more, as they recovered a fumble in the end zone to score yet another touchdown. The extra point was successfully converted, and the Tigers took a 24–7 lead. Clemson topped their victory off with a 24-yard field goal, and they won the game, 27–7.

== Aftermath ==
The Tigers finished the game with eight more first downs, 139 more rushing yards, and 111 more total yards. WVU finished with 28 more passing yards.

As a result of their victory, Clemson rose from their #14 spot to finish at #12 for the 1989 season. The Mountaineers dropped from #17 to #21.
