= American West Conference men's basketball tournament =

Tournament in men's basketball

American West Conference men's basketball tournament (defunct)
- Conference basketball championship
- Sport: College basketball
- Conference: American West Conference
- Number of teams: 4
- Format: Single-elimination tournament
- Played: 1995–1996
- Current champion: Southern Utah
- Most championships: Southern Utah (2)

Host stadiums
- Centrum Center (1995); Matadome (1996)

Host locations
- St. George, UT (1995); Northridge, CA (1996)

The American West Conference men's basketball tournament was the conference championship tournament in men's basketball for the American West Conference (AWC). The tournament was held annually in 1995 and 1996, after which the conference disbanded.

== Tournament champions by year ==
Year	Champion	Score	Runner-up	Venue (and city)
1995	Southern Utah	83–82	Cal State Northridge	Centrum Center (Cedar City, UT)
1996	Southern Utah	55–53	Cal Poly	Matadome (Northridge, CA)

== Finals appearances by school ==
School	Championships	Finals Appearances	Years
Southern Utah	2	2	1995, 1996
Cal State Northridge	0	1	
Cal Poly–San Luis Obispo	0	1	
