= List of Southern Utah Thunderbirds men's basketball coaches =

This is a list of Southern Utah Thunderbirds men's basketball head coaches.

== Coaching records ==
Name	Seasons	Record	Win Pct.
Boyd Adams	1963–71	84–98	.462
Stan Jack	1971–80	145–90	.617
Tom McCracken	1980–83	51–30	.630
Bob Schermerhorn	1983–87	68–42	.618
Neil Roberts	1987–92	70–63	.526
Bill Evans	1992–2007	183–189	.492
Roger Reid	2007–2012	54–97	.358
Nick Robinson	2012–2016	28–90	.237
Todd Simon	2016–2023	118–106	.527
Flynn Clayman	2023	2–1	.667
Rob Jeter	2023–		
Total		801–805	.499
