= 1993 NCAA Division II football season =

American college football season

- Regular season: August – November 1993
- Playoffs: November 20 – December 11, 1993
- National Championship: Braly Municipal Stadium; Florence, AL
- Champion: North Alabama
- Harlon Hill Trophy: Roger Graham, New Haven

The 1993 NCAA Division II football season, part of college football in the United States organized by the National Collegiate Athletic Association at the Division II level, began in August 1993, and concluded with the NCAA Division II Football Championship on December 11, 1993, at Braly Municipal Stadium in Florence, Alabama, hosted by the University of North Alabama.

North Alabama defeated IUP in the championship game, 41–34, to win their first Division II national title.

The Harlon Hill Trophy was awarded to Roger Graham, running back from New Haven.

== Conference changes and new programs ==
=== Conference changes ===
- A 1991 NCAA rule change required athletic programs maintain all of their sports at the same division level by the 1993 season. In order to comply, many Division I programs with football teams at the Division II levels reclassified their programs to Division I-AA, resulting in a large number of teams departing Division II after the 1992 season.
  - After losing four of its core members to this requirement, the Western Football Conference was forced to dissolve before the season. Four of its members reclassified to Division I-AA while its remaining members either became Division II independents or dropped their football programs.
- The West Virginia Intercollegiate Athletic Conference and the South Atlantic Conference both transitioned their entire membership from the NAIA to Division II prior to the season.

Team	1992 conference	1993 conference
Butler	MIFC (D-II)	Pioneer (I-AA)
California–Davis	Northern California (D-II)	American West (I-AA)
Cal Poly	Western (D-II)	American West (I-AA)
Cal State Northridge	Western (D-II)	American West (I-AA)
Cameron	Lone Star	Dropped Program
Central Arkansas	Arkansas (NAIA)	Gulf South (D-II)
Central Connecticut State	D-II Independent	I-AA Independent
C.W. Post	Liberty (D-III)	D-II Independent
Gannon	D-III Independent	D-II Independent
Henderson State	Arkansas (NAIA)	Gulf South (D-II)
Jacksonville State	Gulf South	D-II Independent
Kentucky Wesleyan	D-III Independent	D-II Independent
Mercyhurst	D-III Independent	D-II Independent
Northwood	NAIA Independent	MIFC
Pace	Liberty (D-III)	D-II Independent
Portland State	Western (D-II)	D-II Independent
Sacramento State	Western (D-II)	American West (I-AA)
Sacred Heart	D-III Independent	Independent
St. Francis (IL)	NAIA Independent	MIFC
Santa Clara	Western (D-II)	Dropped Program
Southern Utah	Western (D-II)	American West (I-AA)
Troy State	D-II Independent	I-AA Independent
Valparaiso	MIFC (D-II)	Pioneer (I-AA)

=== Program changes ===
- After Texas A&I University joined the Texas A&M University System in 1989 and changed its name to Texas A&M University–Kingsville in 1993, the Texas A&I Javelinas became the Texas A&M–Kingsville Javelinas at the start of the 1993 season.
- After West Texas State University joined the Texas A&M University System in 1989 and changed its name to West Texas A&M University in 1993, the West Texas State Buffaloes became the West Texas A&M Buffaloes at the start of the 1993 season.

== Conference standings ==
1993 American West Conference football standings
	Conf.					Overall
Team	W		L		T	W		L		T
No. 7 UC Davis +^	3	–	1	–	0	10	–	2	–	0
Southern Utah +	3	–	1	–	0	3	–	7	–	1
Sacramento State	2	–	2	–	0	4	–	6	–	0
Cal Poly	1	–	3	–	0	6	–	4	–	0
Cal State Northridge	1	–	3	–	0	4	–	6	–	0
+ – Conference co-champions; ^ – NCAA Division II playoff participant; Although UC Davis was a conference member, they participated in NCAA Division II polls and postseason.; Rankings from NCAA Division II Football Committee poll

1993 Central Intercollegiate Athletic Association football standings
	Conf.					Overall
Team	W		L		T	W		L		T
No. 3 Hampton $^	8	–	0	–	0	12	–	1	–	0
No. 18 Virginia State	7	–	1	–	0	10	–	1	–	0
Winston-Salem State	5	–	2	–	1	6	–	4	–	1
North Carolina Central	5	–	3	–	0	6	–	5	–	0
Fayetteville State	4	–	4	–	0	6	–	5	–	0
Bowie State	3	–	4	–	1	3	–	6	–	1
Johnson C. Smith	3	–	5	–	0	3	–	8	–	0
Norfolk State	2	–	5	–	1	3	–	7	–	1
Virginia Union	2	–	5	–	1	2	–	8	–	1
Elizabeth City State	1	–	7	–	0	2	–	8	–	0
Livingstone	1	–	7	–	0	1	–	10	–	0
$ – Conference champion; ^ – NCAA Division II playoff participant; Rankings from NCAA Division II Football Committee poll

1993 Eastern Collegiate Football Conference standings
	Conf.					Overall
Team	W		L		T	W		L		T
Bentley $	6	–	0	–	0	10	–	0	–	0
Stonehill	4	–	2	–	0	7	–	2	–	0
MIT	4	–	2	–	0	5	–	3	–	0
Assumption	4	–	2	–	0	6	–	4	–	0
Western New England	2	–	4	–	0	2	–	6	–	1
Curry	1	–	5	–	0	1	–	8	–	0
Nichols	0	–	6	–	0	1	–	8	–	0
$ – Conference champion

1993 Gulf South Conference football standings
	Conf.					Overall
Team	W		L		T	W		L		T
No. 1 North Alabama $^	7	–	0	–	0	14	–	0	–	0
Valdosta State	5	–	2	–	0	8	–	3	–	0
Central Arkansas	4	–	3	–	0	6	–	4	–	1
West Georgia	4	–	3	–	0	4	–	6	–	0
Henderson State	2	–	5	–	0	4	–	6	–	0
Livingston	1	–	5	–	1	2	–	7	–	1
Delta State	1	–	6	–	0	3	–	7	–	0
Mississippi College *	3	–	3	–	1	6	–	4	–	1
$ – Conference champion; ^ – NCAA Division II playoff participant; * – ineligible for conference championship; Rankings from NCAA Division II Football Committee poll

1993 Lone Star Conference football standings
	Conf.					Overall
Team	W		L		T	W		L		T
No. 19 Texas A&M–Kingsville $^	5	–	0	–	0	7	–	6	–	0
Abilene Christian	3	–	2	–	0	7	–	3	–	0
Angelo State	3	–	2	–	0	7	–	3	–	0
Central Oklahoma	2	–	3	–	0	7	–	3	–	0
East Texas State	1	–	4	–	0	5	–	6	–	0
Eastern New Mexico	1	–	4	–	0	1	–	8	–	1
$ – Conference champion; ^ – NCAA Division II playoff participant; Rankings from NCAA Division II Football Committee poll

1993 Mid-America Intercollegiate Athletics Association football standings
	Conf.					Overall
Team	W		L		T	W		L		T
No. 6 Missouri Southern $^	9	–	0	–	0	9	–	1	–	1
No. 17 Pittsburg State ^	8	–	1	–	0	8	–	3	–	0
Missouri Western	6	–	2	–	1	8	–	2	–	1
Central Missouri State	6	–	2	–	1	7	–	2	–	1
NE Missouri State	5	–	4	–	0	6	–	5	–	0
Emporia State	3	–	6	–	0	3	–	7	–	0
NW Missouri State	3	–	6	–	0	3	–	8	–	0
Missouri–Rolla	2	–	7	–	0	3	–	7	–	0
Southwest Baptist	2	–	7	–	0	2	–	9	–	0
Washburn	0	–	9	–	0	0	–	10	–	0
$ – Conference champion; ^ – NCAA Division II playoff participant; Rankings from NCAA Division II Football Committee poll

1993 Midwest Intercollegiate Football Conference standings
	Conf.					Overall
Team	W		L		T	W		L		T
No. 10 Ferris State $^	8	–	0	–	2	9	–	1	–	2
No. 15 Ashland	8	–	2	–	0	9	–	2	–	0
Grand Valley State	6	–	2	–	2	6	–	3	–	2
Hillsdale	6	–	3	–	1	7	–	3	–	1
Northern Michigan	5	–	4	–	1	5	–	4	–	1
Wayne State (MI)	5	–	5	–	0	6	–	5	–	0
St. Francis (IL)	5	–	5	–	0	5	–	6	–	0
Saginaw Valley State	4	–	6	–	0	4	–	7	–	0
Northwood	2	–	7	–	1	3	–	7	–	1
Saint Joseph's (IN)	1	–	8	–	1	1	–	8	–	1
Indianapolis	1	–	9	–	0	2	–	9	–	0
$ – Conference champion; ^ – NCAA Division II playoff participant; Rankings from NCAA Division II Football Committee poll

1993 North Central Conference football standings
	Conf.					Overall
Team	W		L		T	W		L		T
No. 12 Mankato State +^	7	–	2	–	0	10	–	3	–	0
No. 9 North Dakota +^	7	–	2	–	0	10	–	3	–	0
Northern Colorado	6	–	3	–	0	8	–	3	–	0
No. T–20 North Dakota State	6	–	3	–	0	7	–	3	–	0
South Dakota State	6	–	3	–	0	7	–	4	–	0
South Dakota	4	–	5	–	0	6	–	5	–	0
St. Cloud State	4	–	5	–	0	5	–	5	–	0
Augustana (SD)	3	–	6	–	0	4	–	7	–	0
Morningside	1	–	8	–	0	2	–	9	–	0
Nebraska–Omaha	1	–	8	–	0	2	–	9	–	0
+ – Conference co-champions; ^ – NCAA Division II playoff participant; Rankings from NCAA Division II Football Committee poll

1993 Northern California Athletic Conference football standings
	Conf.					Overall
Team	W		L		T	W		L		T
Chico State $	3	–	0	–	1	4	–	4	–	1
Cal State Hayward	2	–	2	–	0	3	–	6	–	0
Sonoma State	2	–	2	–	0	2	–	7	–	0
Humboldt State	1	–	2	–	1	4	–	6	–	1
San Francisco State	1	–	3	–	0	3	–	7	–	0
$ – Conference champion

1993 Northern Sun Intercollegiate Conference football standings
	Conf.					Overall
Team	W		L		T	W		L		T
No. 8 Winona State $^	5	–	1	–	0	7	–	4	–	0
Minnesota Duluth	4	–	2	–	0	8	–	3	–	0
No. 14 Moorhead State	4	–	2	–	0	6	–	4	–	0
Northern State	4	–	2	–	0	6	–	5	–	0
Southwest State (MN)	3	–	3	–	0	4	–	6	–	0
Minnesota Morris	1	–	5	–	0	2	–	9	–	0
Bemidji State	0	–	6	–	0	0	–	10	–	0
$ – Conference champion; ^ – NAIA Division I playoff participant; Rankings from NAIA Division I poll

1993 Pennsylvania State Athletic Conference football standings
	Conf.					Overall
Team	W		L		T	W		L		T
East Division
No. 16 Millersville x	6	–	0	–	0	8	–	2	–	0
East Stroudsburg	4	–	2	–	0	7	–	2	–	1
West Chester	4	–	2	–	0	6	–	5	–	0
Bloomsburg	4	–	2	–	0	5	–	6	–	0
Mansfield	2	–	4	–	0	2	–	8	–	0
Cheyney	1	–	5	–	0	3	–	8	–	0
Kutztown	0	–	6	–	0	2	–	9	–	0
West Division
No. 4 IUP x^	6	–	0	–	0	13	–	1	–	0
No. T–20 Edinboro ^	5	–	1	–	0	8	–	3	–	0
Slippery Rock	3	–	3	–	0	6	–	4	–	0
Clarion	3	–	3	–	0	5	–	5	–	0
Shippensburg	2	–	4	–	0	6	–	5	–	0
California (PA)	2	–	4	–	0	4	–	7	–	0
Lock Haven	0	–	6	–	0	2	–	9	–	0
x – Division champion/co-champions; ^ – NCAA Division II playoff participant; Rankings from NCAA Division II Football Committee poll

1993 Rocky Mountain Athletic Conference football standings
	Conf.					Overall
Team	W		L		T	W		L		T
Fort Hays State $^	6	–	1	–	0	8	–	4	–	0
Western State (CO)	5	–	2	–	0	8	–	3	–	0
New Mexico Highlands	5	–	2	–	0	6	–	4	–	0
Mesa State	5	–	2	–	0	5	–	5	–	0
Adams State	3	–	4	–	0	4	–	6	–	0
Chadron State	2	–	5	–	0	5	–	6	–	0
Colorado Mines	1	–	6	–	0	2	–	7	–	1
Fort Lewis	0	–	7	–	0	1	–	9	–	0
$ – Conference champion; ^ – NCAA Division II playoff participant

1993 South Atlantic Conference football standings
	Conf.					Overall
Team	W		L		T	W		L		T
No. 14 Carson–Newman $^	7	–	0	–	0	8	–	2	–	1
Elon	5	–	2	–	0	8	–	3	–	0
Lenoir–Rhyne	4	–	3	–	0	7	–	3	–	0
Presbyterian	4	–	3	–	0	5	–	6	–	0
Wingate	3	–	4	–	0	6	–	5	–	0
Catawba	3	–	4	–	0	5	–	5	–	0
Mars Hill	2	–	5	–	0	4	–	6	–	0
Gardner–Webb	0	–	7	–	0	1	–	9	–	0
$ – Conference champion; ^ – NCAA Division II playoff participant; Rankings from NCAA Division II Football Committee poll

1993 Southern Intercollegiate Athletic Conference football standings
	Conf.					Overall
Team	W		L		T	W		L		T
No. 8 Albany State $^	8	–	0	–	0	11	–	1	–	0
Fort Valley State	5	–	1	–	1	6	–	4	–	1
Savannah State	4	–	2	–	2	5	–	3	–	2
Morehouse	4	–	3	–	0	5	–	5	–	0
Alabama A&M	4	–	3	–	1	4	–	6	–	1
Morris Brown	3	–	4	–	0	4	–	6	–	0
Tuskegee	3	–	5	–	0	3	–	8	–	0
Clark Atlanta	2	–	5	–	0	3	–	7	–	0
Miles	0	–	8	–	0	0	–	10	–	0
$ – Conference champion; ^ – NCAA Division II playoff participant; Rankings from NCAA Division II Football Committee poll

1993 West Virginia Intercollegiate Athletic Conference football standings
	Conf.					Overall
Team	W		L		T	W		L		T
No. 2 Glenville State $^	6	–	1	–	0	10	–	3	–	0
No. 9 West Virginia Wesleyan	5	–	2	–	0	7	–	3	–	0
Shepherd	5	–	2	–	0	5	–	5	–	0
West Liberty State	5	–	2	–	0	5	–	5	–	0
Concord	4	–	3	–	0	4	–	6	–	0
Fairmont State	2	–	5	–	0	3	–	7	–	0
West Virginia State	1	–	6	–	0	1	–	9	–	0
West Virginia Tech	0	–	7	–	0	0	–	10	–	0
$ – Conference champion; ^ – NAIA Division I playoff participant; Rankings from NAIA Division I poll

1993 NCAA Division II independents football records
	Conf.			Overall
Team	W	L	T	W		L		T
No. 2 New Haven ^		–		11	–	1	–	0
C.W. Post		–		10	–	1	–	0
Wayne State (NE)		–		9	–	1	–	0
No. 5 Portland State ^		–		8	–	3	–	0
Wofford		–		7	–	3	–	1
Michigan Tech		–		6	–	4	–	0
Gannon		–		6	–	4	–	0
Kentucky Wesleyan		–		6	–	4	–	0
Mercyhurst		–		5	–	5	–	0
West Texas A&M		–		3	–	6	–	0
Southern Connecticut State		–		3	–	7	–	1
American International		–		3	–	7	–	0
Jacksonville State		–		3	–	7	–	0
Sacred Heart		–		3	–	7	–	0
Springfield		–		3	–	7	–	0
Lees–McRae		–		2	–	6	–	1
Kentucky State		–		2	–	9	–	0
^ – NCAA Division II playoff participant; Rankings from NCAA Division II Football Committee poll

== Conference summaries ==
Conference Champions

Central Intercollegiate Athletic Association – Hampton
Eastern Collegiate Football Conference – Bentley
Gulf South Conference – North Alabama
Lone Star Conference – Texas A&M–Kingsville
Mid-America Intercollegiate Athletics Association – Missouri Southern State
Midwest Intercollegiate Football Conference – Ferris State
North Central Conference – Minnesota State–Mankato and North Dakota
Northern California Athletic Conference – Cal State Chico
Northern Sun Intercollegiate Conference – Winona State
Pennsylvania State Athletic Conference – Millersville (East), IUP (West)
Rocky Mountain Athletic Conference – Fort Hays State
South Atlantic Conference – Carson-Newman
Southern Intercollegiate Athletic Conference – Albany State
West Virginia Intercollegiate Athletic Conference – Glenville State

== Postseason ==
1993 NCAA Division II Football Championship
- Teams: 16
- Finals Site: Braly Municipal Stadium; Florence, AL
- Champion: North Alabama; (1st title, title game)
- Runner-up: IUP; (2nd title game)
- Semifinalists: Texas A&I; North Dakota
- Winning coach: championship

The 1993 NCAA Division II Football Championship playoffs were the 21st single-elimination tournament to determine the national champion of men's NCAA Division II college football. The championship game was held at Braly Municipal Stadium in Florence, Alabama, for the eighth time.

=== Playoff bracket ===
First round Campus sites
North Alabama	38
Carson–Newman	28
Hampton	33
Albany State	7
Texas A&M–Kingsville	50
Portland State	15
UC Davis	37
Fort Hays State	34
Mankato State	34
Missouri Southern	13
North Dakota	17
Pittsburg State	14
New Haven	48
Edinboro	28
IUP	28
Ferris State	21

Quarterfinals; Campus sites
North Alabama	45
Hampton	20
Texas A&M–Kingsville	51
UC Davis	28
Mankato State	21
North Dakota	54
New Haven	35
IUP	38

Semifinals; Campus sites
North Alabama	27
Texas A&M–Kingsville	25
North Dakota	6
IUP	21

Championship; Braly Municipal Stadium; Florence, AL
North Alabama	41
IUP	34

== See also ==
- 1993 NCAA Division I-A football season
- 1993 NCAA Division I-AA football season
- 1993 NCAA Division III football season
- 1993 NAIA Division I football season
- 1993 NAIA Division II football season
