= Bill Evans (basketball coach) =

American college basketball coach

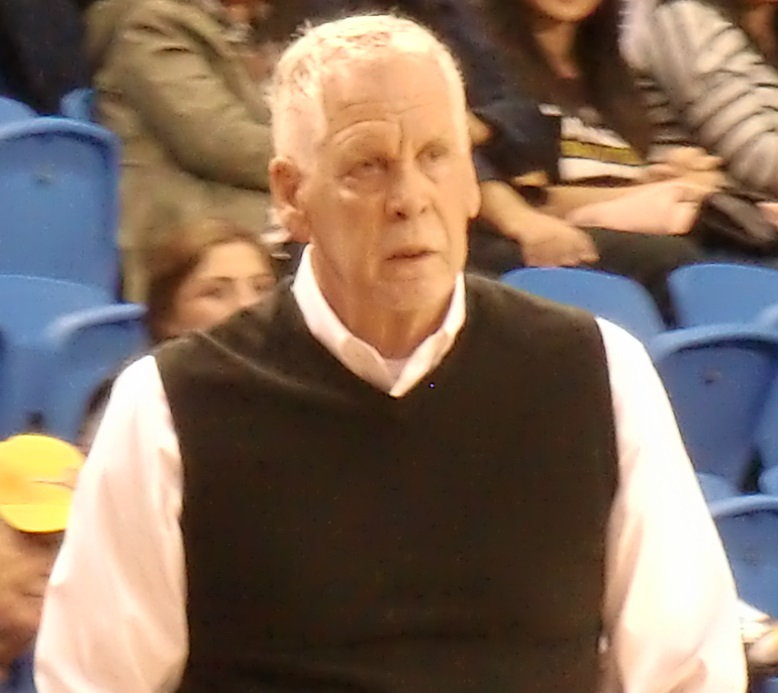
- Evans in 2017.

Current position
- Title: Head coach
- Team: USU Eastern
- Conference: Scenic West
- Record: 63–49 (.563)

Biographical details
- Born: December 31, 1948 (age 77); San Mateo, California, U.S.
- Education: Southern Utah ('72)

Coaching career (HC unless noted)
- 1977–1983: Port Sulphur HS
- 1983–1984: Southern Utah (assistant)
- 1984–1985: Idaho State (GA)
- 1986–1990: Alaska Anchorage (assistant)
- 1991–2007: Southern Utah
- 2007–2012: Montana (assistant)
- 2012–2019: Idaho State
- 2020–present: USU Eastern

Head coaching record
- Overall: 278–364 (.433) (college); 63–49 (.563) (junior college)
- Tournaments: 0–1 (NCAA)

Accomplishments and honors

Championships
- 2× American West tournament (1995, 1996); American West regular season (1995); Mid-Continent tournament (2001)

Awards
- Big Sky Coach of the Year (2016); American West Coach of the Year (1995); Mid-Continent Coach of the Year (2001)

William LaVar Evans (born December 31, 1948) is a college basketball head coach, currently the head coach at USU Eastern.

== Career ==
Prior to USU Eastern, he was the head coach for Idaho State University and at his alma mater Southern Utah University.

== Head coaching record ==
=== College ===
Record table
Season	Team	Overall	Conference	Standing	Postseason
Southern Utah Thunderbirds (NCAA Division I independent) (1991–1994)
1991–92	Southern Utah	5–2			
1992–93	Southern Utah	14–13			
1993–94	Southern Utah	16–11			
Southern Utah Thunderbirds (American West Conference) (1994–1996)
1994–95	Southern Utah	17–11	6–0	1st	
1995–96	Southern Utah	15–13	3–3	2nd	
Southern Utah Thunderbirds (NCAA Division I independent) (1996–1997)
1996–97	Southern Utah	9–17			
Southern Utah Thunderbirds (Mid-Continent Conference) (1997–2007)
1997–98	Southern Utah	7–20	4–12	7th	
1998–99	Southern Utah	13–17	6–8	5th	
1999–2000	Southern Utah	16–13	10–6	3rd	
2000–01	Southern Utah	25–6	13–3	2nd	NCAA Division I Round of 64
2001–02	Southern Utah	11–16	8–6	4th	
2002–03	Southern Utah	11–17	5–9	6th	
2003–04	Southern Utah	10–18	6–10	7th	
2004–05	Southern Utah	13–15	6–10	8th	
2005–06	Southern Utah	10–20	8–8	5th	
2006–07	Southern Utah	16–14	6–8	5th	
Southern Utah:		208–223 (.483)	72–83 (.465)		
Idaho State Bengals (Big Sky Conference) (2012–2019)
2012–13	Idaho State	6–24	5–15	10th	
2013–14	Idaho State	11–18	8–12	10th	
2014–15	Idaho State	7–23	4–14	T–10th	
2015–16	Idaho State	16–15	11–7	4th	
2016–17	Idaho State	5–26	3–15	T–11th	
2017–18	Idaho State	14–16	9–9	T–6th	
2018–19	Idaho State	11–19	7–13	10th	
Idaho State:		70–141 (.332)	47–85 (.356)		
Total:		278–364 (.433)			
National champion Postseason invitational champion Conference regular season champion Conference regular season and conference tournament champion Division regular season champion Division regular season and conference tournament champion Conference tournament champion

=== Junior college ===
Record table
Season	Team	Overall	Conference	Standing	Postseason
USU Eastern Golden Eagles (Scenic West Athletic Conference) (2020–present)
2020–21	USU Eastern	14–10	6–9	4th	
2021–22	USU Eastern	18–12	9–9	4th	
USU Eastern:		32–20 (.615)	15–18 (.455)		
Total:		32–20 (.615)			
