= Neil Roberts (basketball) =

American basketball player and coach

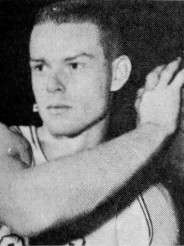
- Roberts, circa 1967

Biographical details
- Born: May 8, 1945 (age 81); Cedar City, Utah, U.S.

Playing career
- 1964–1967: BYU

Coaching career (HC unless noted)
- 1978–1985: Dixie State
- 1988–1992: Southern Utah

Head coaching record
- Overall: High School: 172–38 (.819); NCAA: 54–51 (.514)

Neil Roberts (born May 8, 1945) is an American former basketball coach who coached at both Dixie State and Southern Utah.

== Playing career ==
Roberts played college basketball at BYU from 1964 to 1967. He was named Look Magazine All-American in 1967.

== Coaching career ==
Roberts' coaching career would begin in the high school ranks, notably at Skyline High School, where he won two state championships. He compiled a 172–38 overall record as a high school coach. In 1978, Roberts would accept the head coaching position at then-NJCAA program Dixie State. He remained with the Trailblazers until 1985, making three national tournaments and winning the 1985 NJCAA Division I championship. After a brief hiatus from coaching, Roberts would become the head coach at Southern Utah, helping guide its transition from NCAA Division II to Division I. He served as coach until 1992, ending with a 54–51 record. Roberts resigned as coach during the 1991–92 season after being accused of shoplifting a $30 necktie. He was replaced by Bill Evans.

== Head coaching record ==
=== College ===
Record table
Season	Team	Overall	Conference	Standing	Postseason
Southern Utah Thunderbirds (Independent) (1988–1992)
1988–89	Southern Utah	10–18			
1989–90	Southern Utah	13–15			
1990–91	Southern Utah	16–12			
1991–92	Southern Utah	15–6^{‡}			
Southern Utah:		54–51 (.514)			
Total:		54–51 (.514)			

‡ Resigned midseason
