= 1993 Sonoma State Cossacks football team =

American college football season

1993 Sonoma State Cossacks football
- Conference: Northern California Athletic Conference
- Record: 2–7 (2–2 NCAC)
- Head coach: Frank Scalercio (1st season)
- Home stadium: Cossacks Stadium

1993 Northern California Athletic Conference football standings
	Conf.					Overall
Team	W		L		T	W		L		T
Chico State $	3	–	0	–	1	4	–	4	–	1
Cal State Hayward	2	–	2	–	0	3	–	6	–	0
Sonoma State	2	–	2	–	0	2	–	7	–	0
Humboldt State	1	–	2	–	1	4	–	6	–	1
San Francisco State	1	–	3	–	0	3	–	7	–	0
$ – Conference champion

The 1993 Sonoma State Cossacks football team represented Sonoma State University as a member of the Northern California Athletic Conference (NCAC) during the 1993 NCAA Division II football season. Led by first-year head coach Frank Scalercio, Sonoma State compiled an overall record of 2–7 with a mark of 2–2 in conference play, tying for second place in the NCAC. The team was outscored by its opponents 308 to 193 for the season. The Cossacks played home games at Cossacks Stadium (Note: Cossacks Stadium was renamed in 2002 to Seawolf Stadium when the University changed the name of the mascot to Seawolves.) in Rohnert Park, California.

== Schedule ==
Date	Opponent	Site	Result	Attendance	Source
September 4	at Weber State*	Wildcat Stadium; Ogden, UT	L 28–40	5,705	
September 18	Saint Mary's*	Cossacks Stadium; Rohnert Park, CA	L 23–44	1,152	
September 25	at Cal State Northridge*	North Campus Stadium; Northridge, CA	L 0–39	2,867	
October 2	Cal Poly*	Cossacks Stadium; Rohnert Park, CA	L 13–53	440–450	
October 16	No. 12 UC Davis*	Cossacks Stadium; Rohnert Park, CA	L 21–31	1,629	
October 23	at Cal State Hayward	Pioneer Stadium; Hayward, CA	L 19–20	250–540	
October 30	at Humboldt State	Redwood Bowl; Arcata, CA	W 28–17	2,015	
November 6	Chico State	Cossacks Stadium; Rohnert Park, CA	L 27–33	464	
November 13	at San Francisco State	Cox Stadium; San Francisco, CA	W 34–31	1,074	
*Non-conference game; Rankings from NCAA Division II Football Committee Poll released prior to the game

== Team players in the NFL ==
The following Sonoma State player was selected in the 1994 NFL draft.

Player	Position	Round	Overall	NFL team
Larry Allen	Guard, tackle	2	46	Dallas Cowboys
