= 1993 Humboldt State Lumberjacks football team =

American college football season

1993 Humboldt State Lumberjacks football
- Conference: Northern California Athletic Conference
- Record: 4–6–1 (1–2–1 NCAC)
- Head coach: Fred Whitmire (3rd season)
- Home stadium: Redwood Bowl

1993 Northern California Athletic Conference football standings
	Conf.					Overall
Team	W		L		T	W		L		T
Chico State $	3	–	0	–	1	4	–	4	–	1
Cal State Hayward	2	–	2	–	0	3	–	6	–	0
Sonoma State	2	–	2	–	0	2	–	7	–	0
Humboldt State	1	–	2	–	1	4	–	6	–	1
San Francisco State	1	–	3	–	0	3	–	7	–	0
$ – Conference champion

The 1993 Humboldt State Lumberjacks football team represented Humboldt State University—now known as California State Polytechnic University, Humboldt—as a member of the Northern California Athletic Conference (NCAC) during the 1993 NCAA Division II football season. Led by third-year head coach Fred Whitmire, the Lumberjacks compiled an overall record of 4–6–1 with a mark of 1–2–1 in conference play, placing fourth in the NCAC The team was outscored by its opponents 249 to 180 for the season. Humboldt State played home games at the Redwood Bowl in Arcata, California.

== Schedule ==
Date	Opponent	Site	Result	Attendance	Source
September 4	Rocky Mountain*	Redwood Bowl; Arcata, CA	W 24–20	3,472	
September 11	at Western Montana*	Vigilante Stadium; Dillon, MT	W 22–7	1,500	
September 18	Cal Poly*	Redwood Bowl; Arcata, CA	L 3–17	3,075–3,200	
September 25	Saint Mary's*	Redwood Bowl; Arcata, CA	L 0–21	2,700	
October 2	at No. 14 UC Davis*	Toomey Field; Davis, CA	L 9–45	7,300	
October 9	Azusa Pacific*	Redwood Bowl; Arcata, CA	W 20–10	1,705	
October 16	San Francisco State	Redwood Bowl; Arcata, CA	L 21–24	2,581	
October 23	at Western New Mexico*	Altamirano Stadium; Silver City, NM	L 15–40	2,200	
October 30	Sonoma State	Redwood Bowl; Arcata, CA	L 17–28	2,015	
November 6	at Cal State Hayward	Pioneer Stadium; Hayward, CA	W 33–21	660–800	
November 13	at Chico State	University Stadium; Chico, CA	T 16–16	1,478–2,005	
*Non-conference game; Rankings from NCAA Division II Football Committee Poll released prior to the game
