= List of Sonoma State Cossacks head football coaches =

The Sonoma State Cossacks college football team represented Sonoma State. The Cossacks competed in the Far Western Conference in 1971 then discontinued the football program. In 1982 they restarted the program, joining the renamed conference Northern California Athletic Conference in 1983. They remained the NCAC until the program was permanently ended after the 1996 season.

The program had 6 identifiable head coaches in its 19 years of competitive existence. They also fielded a JV team only in the 1969 & 1979 seasons.

== Coaches ==
| No. | Coach | Tenure | Seasons | Win | Loss | Tie | Pct. | Bowls |
|---|---|---|---|---|---|---|---|---|
| 1 | Carl Peterson | 1970–1971 | 2 | 6 | 12 | 1 | .342 | 0 |
| 2 | Milt Cerf | 1980–1981 | 2 | 9 | 11 | 0 | .450 | 0 |
| 3 | Tony Kehl | 1982–1986 | 5 | 12 | 40 | 0 | .231 | 0 |
| 4 | Marty Fine | 1987–1988 | 2 | 10 | 11 | 0 | .476 | 0 |
| 5 | Tim Walsh | 1989–1992 | 4 | 27 | 14 | 0 | .659 | 0 |
| 6 | Frank Scalercio | 1993–1996 | 4 | 7 | 30 | 1 | .197 | 0 |
| | Totals | 1969–1996 | 19 | 72 | 117 | 2 | .382 | 0 |
