= 1993 San Francisco State Gators football team =

American college football season

1993 San Francisco State Gators football
- Conference: Northern California Athletic Conference
- Record: 3–7 (1–3 NCAC)
- Head coach: Dick Mannini (2nd season)
- Home stadium: Cox Stadium

1993 Northern California Athletic Conference football standings
	Conf.					Overall
Team	W		L		T	W		L		T
Chico State $	3	–	0	–	1	4	–	4	–	1
Cal State Hayward	2	–	2	–	0	3	–	6	–	0
Sonoma State	2	–	2	–	0	2	–	7	–	0
Humboldt State	1	–	2	–	1	4	–	6	–	1
San Francisco State	1	–	3	–	0	3	–	7	–	0
$ – Conference champion

The 1993 San Francisco State Gators football team represented San Francisco State University as a member of the Northern California Athletic Conference (NCAC) during the 1993 NCAA Division II football season. Led by second-year head coach Dick Mannini, San Francisco State compiled an overall record of 3–7 with a mark of 1–3 in conference play, placing last out of five teams in the NCAC. For the season the team was outscored by its opponents 286 to 212. The Gators played home games at Cox Stadium in San Francisco.

== Schedule ==
Date	Opponent	Site	Result	Attendance	Source
September 4	Saint Mary's*	Cox Stadium; San Francisco, CA	L 6–27	1,153	
September 11	Sacramento State*	Cox Stadium; San Francisco, CA	L 10–49	1,072	
September 18	at Menlo*	Atherton, CA	W 32–0	754	
September 25	Western New Mexico*	Cox Stadium; San Francisco, CA	W 32–12	756	
October 9	at Cal Poly*	Mustang Stadium; San Luis Obispo, CA	L 24–46	5,490	
October 16	at Humboldt State	Redwood Bowl; Arcata, CA	W 24–21	2,581	
October 23	at Chico State	University Stadium; Chico, CA	L 21–24	2,315–8,620	
October 30	Cal State Hayward	Cox Stadium; San Francisco, CA	L 21–28	600–1,008	
November 6	at No. 8 UC Davis*	Toomey Field; Davis, CA	L 14–45	4,400	
November 13	Sonoma State	Cox Stadium; San Francisco, CA	L 31–34	1,074	
*Non-conference game; Rankings from NCAA Division II Football Committee Poll released prior to the game
