= 1993 Chico State Wildcats football team =

American college football season

1993 Chico State Wildcats football

NCAC champion
- Conference: Northern California Athletic Conference
- Record: 4–4–1 (3–0–1 NCAC)
- Head coach: Gary Hauser (5th season)
- Home stadium: University Stadium

1993 Northern California Athletic Conference football standings
	Conf.					Overall
Team	W		L		T	W		L		T
Chico State $	3	–	0	–	1	4	–	4	–	1
Cal State Hayward	2	–	2	–	0	3	–	6	–	0
Sonoma State	2	–	2	–	0	2	–	7	–	0
Humboldt State	1	–	2	–	1	4	–	6	–	1
San Francisco State	1	–	3	–	0	3	–	7	–	0
$ – Conference champion

The 1993 Chico State Wildcats football team represented California State University, Chico as a member of the Northern California Athletic Conference (NCAC) during the 1993 NCAA Division II football season. Led by fifth-year head coach Gary Hauser, Chico State compiled an overall record of 4–4–1 with a mark of 3–0–1 in conference play, winning the NCAC title. The team was outscored by its opponents 248 to 181 for the season. The Wildcats played home games at University Stadium in Chico, California.

== Schedule ==
Date	Opponent	Site	Result	Attendance	Source
September 11	Whittier*	University Stadium; Chico, CA	W 42–17	878	
September 25	at Cal Poly*	Mustang Stadium; San Luis Obispo, CA	L 6–63	4,465	
October 2	at Saint Mary's*	Saint Mary's Stadium; Moraga, CA	L 15–27	2,702	
October 9	No. 17 UC Davis*	University Stadium; Chico, CA	L 10–35	1,638–4,863	
October 16	at Cal State Hayward	Pioneer Stadium; Hayward, CA	W 28–21	600	
October 23	San Francisco State	University Stadium; Chico, CA	W 24–21	2,315–8,620	
October 30	at Cal State Northridge*	North Campus Stadium; Northridge, CA	L 7–21	4,576	
November 6	at Sonoma State	Cossacks Stadium; Rohnert Park, CA	W 33–27	464	
November 13	Humboldt State	University Stadium; Chico, CA	T 16–16	1,478–2,005	
*Non-conference game; Rankings from NCAA Division II Football Committee Poll released prior to the game
