= 1993 Northwestern State Demons football team =

American college football season

1993 Northwestern State Demons football
- Conference: Southland Conference
- Record: 5–6 (3–4 Southland)
- Head coach: Sam Goodwin (11th season)
- Home stadium: Harry Turpin Stadium

1993 Southland Conference football standings
	Conf.					Overall
Team	W		L		T	W		L		T
No. 5 McNeese State $^	7	–	0	–	0	10	–	3	–	0
No. 4 NE Louisiana ^	6	–	1	–	0	9	–	3	–	0
No. 14 Stephen F. Austin ^	5	–	2	–	0	8	–	4	–	0
Northwestern State	3	–	4	–	0	5	–	6	–	0
Sam Houston State	2	–	5	–	0	4	–	7	–	0
North Texas	2	–	5	–	0	4	–	7	–	0
Nicholls State	2	–	5	–	0	3	–	8	–	0
SW Texas State	1	–	6	–	0	2	–	9	–	0
$ – Conference champion; ^ – NCAA Division I-AA playoff participant; Rankings from The Sports Network poll

The 1993 Northwestern State Demons football team was an American football team that represented Northwestern State University as a member of the Southland Conference during the 1993 NCAA Division I-AA football season. In their 11th year under head coach Sam Goodwin, the team compiled an overall record of 5–6, with a mark of 3–4 in conference play, and finished fourth in the Southland.

== Schedule ==
Date	Opponent	Site	Result	Attendance	Source
September 4	vs. Southern*	Louisiana Superdome; New Orleans, LA	L 13–30	13,583	
September 11	No. 9 Troy State*	Harry Turpin Stadium; Natchitoches, LA	L 14–21		
September 25	No. T–18 (D-II) East Texas State*	Harry Turpin Stadium; Natchitoches, LA	W 30–19	9,200	
October 2	at No. 6 Northeast Louisiana	Malone Stadium; Monroe, LA (rivalry)	L 24–26		
October 9	Nicholls State	Harry Turpin Stadium; Natchitoches, LA (rivalry)	W 35–21		
October 16	at Sam Houston State	Bowers Stadium; Huntsville, TX	W 34–27	3,227	
October 23	at North Texas	Fouts Field; Denton, TX	W 38–37	13,994	
October 30	Southwest Texas State	Harry Turpin Stadium; Natchitoches, LA	L 15–22		
November 6	at Eastern Illinois*	O'Brien Stadium; Charleston, IL	W 34–26		
November 13	No. 7 McNeese State	Harry Turpin Stadium; Natchitoches, LA (rivalry)	L 7–34		
November 20	No. 17 Stephen F. Austin	Harry Turpin Stadium; Natchitoches, LA (rivalry)	L 20–51		
*Non-conference game; Rankings from The Sports Network Poll released prior to the game
