= 1993 Cal State Hayward Pioneers football team =

American college football season

1993 Cal State Hayward Pioneers football
- Conference: Northern California Athletic Conference
- Record: 3–6 (2–2 NCAC)
- Head coach: Tim Tierney (19th season)
- Home stadium: Pioneer Stadium

1993 Northern California Athletic Conference football standings
	Conf.					Overall
Team	W		L		T	W		L		T
Chico State $	3	–	0	–	1	4	–	4	–	1
Cal State Hayward	2	–	2	–	0	3	–	6	–	0
Sonoma State	2	–	2	–	0	2	–	7	–	0
Humboldt State	1	–	2	–	1	4	–	6	–	1
San Francisco State	1	–	3	–	0	3	–	7	–	0
$ – Conference champion

The 1993 Cal State Hayward Pioneers football team represented California State University, Hayward—now known as California State University, East Bay—as a member of the Northern California Athletic Conference (NCAC) during the 1993 NCAA Division II football season. Led by 19th-year head coach Tim Tierney, Cal State Hayward compiled an overall record of 3–6 with a mark of 2–2 in conference play, tying for second place in the NCAC. The team was outscored by its opponents 294 to 188 for the season. The Pioneers played home games at Pioneer Stadium in Hayward, California.

In January 1994, Cal State Hayward announced they were dropping the football program as a cost-cutting measure and to make a move toward reaching gender equity in their athletic program. Tierney finished his tenure at Cal State Hayward with an overall record of 77–109–5, for a winning percentage of .416.

== Schedule ==
Date	Opponent	Site	Result	Attendance	Source
September 4	at Sacramento State*	Hornet Stadium; Sacramento, CA	L 17–34	2,041–5,350	
September 11	at Saint Mary's*	Saint Mary's Stadium; Moraga, CA	L 0–44	2,300	
September 18	at No. 12 UC Davis*	Toomey Field; Davis, CA	L 13–52	3,400–3,750	
September 25	Redlands*	Pioneer Stadium; Hayward, CA	L 23–27	350	
October 2	at Azusa Pacific*	Cougar Athletic Stadium; Azusa, CA	W 45–36	560	
October 16	Chico State	Pioneer Stadium; Hayward, CA	L 21–28	600	
October 23	Sonoma State	Pioneer Stadium; Hayward, CA	W 20–19	250–540	
October 30	at San Francisco State	Cox Stadium; San Francisco, CA	W 28–21	600–1,008	
November 6	Humboldt State	Pioneer Stadium; Hayward, CA	L 21–33	660–800	
*Non-conference game; Rankings from NCAA Division II Football Committee Poll released prior to the game
