= Frank Scalercio =

American football player and coach (born 1960)

Biographical details
- Born: January 3, 1960

Playing career
- 1980–1981: UC Davis

Coaching career (HC unless noted)
- 1983–1992: Sonoma State (assistant)
- 1993–1996: Sonoma State

Head coaching record
- Overall: 7–30–1

Accomplishments and honors

Championships
- 1 NCAC (1994)

Frank Scalercio (born January 3, 1960) is an American college football coach, who served as the head coach of the Sonoma State Cossacks from 1993 to 1996. During this time he compiled an overall record of 7–30–1 with future NFL All-Pro guard Larry Allen being his most notable player. Scalercio was relieved of his position in December 1996 when the university president Reuben Arminana decided to discontinue the football program in part after students rejected a $300 fee increase to help in covering its operating costs.

== Head coaching record ==
Year	Team	Overall	Conference	Standing	Bowl/playoffs
Sonoma State Cossacks (Northern California Athletic Conference) (1993–1996)
1993	Sonoma State	2–7	2–2	T–2nd	
1994	Sonoma State	3–7	2–1	T–1st	
1995	Sonoma State	0–8–1	0–3–1	3rd	
1996	Sonoma State	2–8	2–2	2nd	
Sonoma State:		7–30–1	6–8–1		
Total:		7–30–1			
