= 1993 Stephen F. Austin Lumberjacks football team =

American college football season

1993 Stephen F. Austin Lumberjacks football

NCAA Division I-AA First Round, L 20–42 at Troy State
- Conference: Southland Conference

Ranking
- Sports Network: No. 14
- Record: 8–4 (5–2 SLC)
- Head coach: John Pearce (2nd season)
- Home stadium: Homer Bryce Stadium

1993 Southland Conference football standings
	Conf.					Overall
Team	W		L		T	W		L		T
No. 5 McNeese State $^	7	–	0	–	0	10	–	3	–	0
No. 4 NE Louisiana ^	6	–	1	–	0	9	–	3	–	0
No. 14 Stephen F. Austin ^	5	–	2	–	0	8	–	4	–	0
Northwestern State	3	–	4	–	0	5	–	6	–	0
Sam Houston State	2	–	5	–	0	4	–	7	–	0
North Texas	2	–	5	–	0	4	–	7	–	0
Nicholls State	2	–	5	–	0	3	–	8	–	0
SW Texas State	1	–	6	–	0	2	–	9	–	0
$ – Conference champion; ^ – NCAA Division I-AA playoff participant; Rankings from The Sports Network poll

The 1993 Stephen F. Austin Lumberjacks football team was an American football team that represented Stephen F. Austin State University as a member of the Southland Conference during the 1993 NCAA Division I-AA football season. In their second year under head coach John Pearce, the team compiled an overall record of 8–4, with a mark of 5–2 in conference play, and finished third in the Southland. Stephen F. Austin advanced to the NCAA Division I-AA First Round and were defeated by Troy State.

== Schedule ==
Date	Opponent	Rank	Site	Result	Attendance	Source
September 2	No. 6 Idaho*		Homer Bryce Stadium; Nacogdoches, TX	L 30–38	11,124	
September 11	No. 2 Youngstown State*		Homer Bryce Stadium; Nacogdoches, TX	W 35–15		
September 18	Livingston*	No. 22	Homer Bryce Stadium; Nacogdoches, TX	W 49–28		
September 25	at Boise State*	No. 18	Bronco Stadium; Boise, ID	W 30–7	19,070	
October 9	Sam Houston State	No. 13	Homer Bryce Stadium; Nacogdoches, TX (rivalry)	W 24–20	10,020	
October 16	at Nicholls State	No. 10	Homer Bryce Stadium; Nacogdoches, TX	W 35–21		
October 23	at No. 12 Northeast Louisiana	No. 10	Malone Stadium; Monroe, LA	L 10–26		
October 30	No. 9 McNeese State	No. 16	Homer Bryce Stadium; Nacogdoches, TX	L 20–21	10,864	
November 6	at North Texas	No. 22	Fouts Field; Denton, TX	W 29–27	7,129	
November 13	Southwest Texas State	No. 19	Homer Bryce Stadium; Nacogdoches, TX	W 27–10		
November 20	at Northwestern State	No. 17	Harry Turpin Stadium; Natchitoches, LA (rivalry)	W 51–20		
November 27	at No. 1 Troy State*	No. 14	Veterans Memorial Stadium; Troy, AL (NCAA Division I-AA First Round)	L 20–42	4,500	
*Non-conference game; Rankings from The Sports Network Poll released prior to the game
