= 1993 Southern Utah Thunderbirds football team =

American college football season

1993 Southern Utah Thunderbirds football

AWC co-champion
- Conference: American West Conference
- Record: 3–7–1 (3–1 AWC)
- Head coach: Jack Bishop (13th season)
- Home stadium: Coliseum of Southern Utah

1993 American West Conference football standings
	Conf.					Overall
Team	W		L		T	W		L		T
No. 7 UC Davis +^	3	–	1	–	0	10	–	2	–	0
Southern Utah +	3	–	1	–	0	3	–	7	–	1
Sacramento State	2	–	2	–	0	4	–	6	–	0
Cal Poly	1	–	3	–	0	6	–	4	–	0
Cal State Northridge	1	–	3	–	0	4	–	6	–	0
+ – Conference co-champions; ^ – NCAA Division II playoff participant; Although UC Davis was a conference member, they participated in NCAA Division II polls and postseason.; Rankings from NCAA Division II Football Committee poll

The 1993 Southern Utah Thunderbirds football team was an American football team that represented Southern Utah University as a member of the American West Conference (AWC) during the 1993 NCAA Division I-AA football season. In their 13th year under head coach Jack Bishop, the team compiled an overall record of 3–7–1, with a mark of 3–1 in conference play, and finished as AWC co-champions.

== Schedule ==
Date	Opponent	Site	Result	Attendance	Source
September 4	Northern Arizona*	Coliseum of Southern Utah; Cedar City, UT	L 27–31	5,123	
September 11	at Angelo State*	San Angelo Stadium; San Angelo, TX	L 16–18	6,400	
September 18	at Central Oklahoma*	Wantland Stadium; Edmond, OK	L 20–21	4,926	
September 25	No. 10 (D-II) UC Davis	Coliseum of Southern Utah; Cedar City, UT	W 28–27	5,829	
October 9	at Montana State*	Reno H. Sales Stadium; Bozeman, MT	L 30–32	3,897	
October 16	No. 20 Cal Poly	Coliseum of Southern Utah; Cedar City, UT	L 6–38	5,582	
October 23	at Saint Mary's*	Saint Mary's Stadium; Moraga, CA	T 35–35	3,058	
October 30	at Weber State*	Wildcat Stadium; Ogden, UT	L 39–43	3,258	
November 6	Portland State*	Coliseum of Southern Utah; Cedar City, UT	L 14–24	3,083	
November 13	at Cal State Northridge	North Campus Stadium; Northridge, CA	W 20–17		
November 20	at Sacramento State	Hornet Stadium; Sacramento, CA	W 23–17	1,562	
*Non-conference game; Rankings from The Sports Network Poll released prior to the game
