= 1993 Weber State Wildcats football team =

American college football season

1993 Weber State Wildcats football
- Conference: Big Sky Conference
- Record: 7–4 (3–4 Big Sky)
- Head coach: Dave Arslanian (5th season)
- Home stadium: Wildcat Stadium

1993 Big Sky Conference football standings
	Conf.					Overall
Team	W		L		T	W		L		T
No. 3 Montana $^	7	–	0	–	0	10	–	2	–	0
No. 11 Idaho ^	5	–	2	–	0	11	–	3	–	0
No. 20 Eastern Washington	5	–	2	–	0	7	–	3	–	0
Montana State	4	–	3	–	0	7	–	4	–	0
Northern Arizona	3	–	4	–	0	7	–	4	–	0
Weber State	3	–	4	–	0	7	–	4	–	0
Boise State	1	–	6	–	0	3	–	8	–	0
Idaho State	0	–	7	–	0	0	–	11	–	0
$ – Conference champion; ^ – NCAA Division I-AA playoff participant; Rankings from The Sports Network poll

The 1993 Weber State Wildcats football team represented Weber State University as a member of the Big Sky Conference during the 1993 NCAA Division I-AA football season. Led by fifth-year head coach Dave Arslanian, the Wildcats compiled an overall record of 7–4 with a mark of 3–4 on conference play, tying for fifth place in the Big Sky. It was the team's third consecutive winning season. In their October 23 matchup against Nevada, the Wildcats upset the NCAA Division I-A Wolfpack, for their second consecutive victory against the former conference foe. Weber State played their home games at Wildcat Stadium in Ogden, Utah.

== Schedule ==
Date	Opponent	Site	Result	Attendance	Source
September 4	Sonoma State*	Wildcat Stadium; Ogden, UT	W 40–28	5,705	
September 11	Cal State Northridge*	Wildcat Stadium; Ogden, UT	W 27–12	6,337	
September 18	No. 4 Idaho	Wildcat Stadium; Ogden, UT	L 0–56	6,094	
September 25	at Montana State	Sales Stadium; Bozeman, MT	L 10–14	11,227	
October 2	Eastern Washington	Wildcat Stadium; Ogden, UT	L 22–36		
October 9	at No. 12 Montana	Washington-Grizzly Stadium; Missoula, MT	L 17–45	10,180	
October 16	Boise State^{†}	Wildcat Stadium; Ogden, UT	W 21–14	3,971	
October 23	at Nevada*	Mackay Stadium; Reno, NV	W 47–30	24,089	
October 30	Southern Utah*	Wildcat Stadium; Ogden, UT	W 43–39	3,258	
November 6	Northern Arizona	Wildcat Stadium; Ogden, UT	W 67–28	3,941	
November 13	at Idaho State	Holt Arena; Pocatello, ID	W 21–17	6,222	
*Non-conference game; ^{†}Homecoming; Rankings from The Sports Network Poll released prior to the game
