= Zornes =

Zornes is a surname. Notable people with the surname include:

- Dick Zornes (born 1944), American football player, coach, and college athletics administrator
- Milford Zornes (1908–2008), American painter
