= Vic Buccola =

American football player

Vic Buccola is a former college sports conference commissioner and former professional American football player in the Canadian Football League.

== Early years ==
Buccola came to Cal Poly in San Luis Obispo from Rosemead after graduating from Mark Keppel High School.

He played guard for the Mustang football team, including for the undefeated 1953 squad.

== Professional football career ==
Buccola signed into the CFL in May 1956 and then started at guard for the Saskatchewan Roughriders for a portion of the 1956 season before injuries led to the end of his playing days after one season.

== Administrative career ==
After serving as Cal Poly's athletics director from July 1973 to August 1981, Buccola was appointed as commissioner of the Western Football Conference in January 1982.

In 1993, he became commissioner of the American West Conference.
