= 1993 McNeese State Cowboys football team =

American college football season

1993 McNeese State Cowboys football

Southland champion

NCAA Division I-AA Quarterfinal, L 16–22 vs. Troy State
- Conference: Southland Conference

Ranking
- Sports Network: No. 5
- Record: 10–3 (7–0 Southland)
- Head coach: Bobby Keasler (4th season)
- Offensive coordinator: Mike Santiago (4th season)
- Defensive coordinator: Kirby Bruchhaus (4th season)
- Home stadium: Cowboy Stadium

1993 Southland Conference football standings
	Conf.					Overall
Team	W		L		T	W		L		T
No. 5 McNeese State $^	7	–	0	–	0	10	–	3	–	0
No. 4 NE Louisiana ^	6	–	1	–	0	9	–	3	–	0
No. 14 Stephen F. Austin ^	5	–	2	–	0	8	–	4	–	0
Northwestern State	3	–	4	–	0	5	–	6	–	0
Sam Houston State	2	–	5	–	0	4	–	7	–	0
North Texas	2	–	5	–	0	4	–	7	–	0
Nicholls State	2	–	5	–	0	3	–	8	–	0
SW Texas State	1	–	6	–	0	2	–	9	–	0
$ – Conference champion; ^ – NCAA Division I-AA playoff participant; Rankings from The Sports Network poll

The 1993 McNeese State Cowboys football team was an American football team that represented McNeese State University as a member of the Southland Conference (Southland) during the 1993 NCAA Division I-AA football season. In their fourth year under head coach Bobby Keasler, the team compiled an overall record of 10–3, with a mark of 7–0 in conference play, and finished as Southland champion. The Cowboys advanced to the Division I-AA playoffs and lost to Troy State in the quarterfinals.

== Schedule ==
Date	Opponent	Rank	Site	Result	Attendance	Source
September 4	No. 4 Northern Iowa*	No. 7	Cowboy Stadium; Lake Charles, LA	W 27–10	19,572	
September 11	Eastern Illinois*	No. 3	Cowboy Stadium; Lake Charles, LA	W 49–7	19,579	
September 18	at Illinois State*	No. 2	Hancock Stadium; Normal, IL	L 27–37	9,819	
September 25	at No. 22 UCF*	No. 10	Florida Citrus Bowl; Orlando, FL	L 3–22	10,759	
October 9	at No. 4 Northeast Louisiana	No. 18	Malone Stadium; Monroe, LA	W 34–26	20,180	
October 16	North Texas	No. 13	Cowboy Stadium; Lake Charles, LA	W 18–17		
October 23	Sam Houston State	No. 13	Cowboy Stadium; Lake Charles, LA	W 34–14	19,879	
October 30	at No. 16 Stephen F. Austin	No. 9	Homer Bryce Stadium; Nacogdoches, TX	W 21–20	10,864	
November 6	at Southwest Texas State	No. 8	Bobcat Stadium; San Marcos, TX	W 27–10		
November 13	at Northwestern State	No. 7	Harry Turpin Stadium; Natchitoches, LA (rivalry)	W 34–7		
November 20	Nicholls State	No. 5	Cowboy Stadium; Lake Charles, LA	W 27–0		
November 27	No. 10 William & Mary*	No. 5	Cowboy Stadium; Lake Charles, LA (NCAA Division I-AA First Round)	W 34–28	17,167	
December 4	No. 1 Troy State*	No. 5	Cowboy Stadium; Lake Charles, LA (NCAA Division I-AA Quarterfinal)	L 28–35		
*Non-conference game; Rankings from The Sports Network Poll released prior to the game
