= 1993 North Alabama Lions football team =

American college football season

1993 North Alabama Lions football

NCAA Division II champion GSC champion

NCAA Division II Championship Game, W 41–34 vs. IUP
- Conference: Gulf South Conference
- Record: 14–0 (7–0 GSC)
- Head coach: Bobby Wallace (6th season)
- Offensive coordinator: Willie J. Slater (2nd season)
- Defensive coordinator: Bill Hyde (13th season)
- Home stadium: Braly Municipal Stadium

1993 Gulf South Conference football standings
	Conf.					Overall
Team	W		L		T	W		L		T
No. 1 North Alabama $^	7	–	0	–	0	14	–	0	–	0
Valdosta State	5	–	2	–	0	8	–	3	–	0
Central Arkansas	4	–	3	–	0	6	–	4	–	1
West Georgia	4	–	3	–	0	4	–	6	–	0
Henderson State	2	–	5	–	0	4	–	6	–	0
Livingston	1	–	5	–	1	2	–	7	–	1
Delta State	1	–	6	–	0	3	–	7	–	0
Mississippi College *	3	–	3	–	1	6	–	4	–	1
$ – Conference champion; ^ – NCAA Division II playoff participant; * – ineligible for conference championship; Rankings from NCAA Division II Football Committee poll

The 1993 North Alabama Lions football team represented the University of North Alabama as a member of the Gulf South Conference (GSC) during the 1993 NCAA Division II football season, and completed the 61st season of Lions football. The Lions played their home games at Braly Municipal Stadium in Florence Alabama. Led by sixth-year coach Bobby Wallace, the Lions finished the regular season with an undefeated 10–0 record, won the GSC title, and advanced to the NCAA Division II playoffs. North Alabama defeated the IUP, 41–34, in the national title game to secure the program's first NCAA Division II Football Championship.

== Schedule ==
Date	Time	Opponent	Rank	Site	TV	Result	Attendance	Source
September 4	7:00 p.m.	Fort Valley State*	No. 2	Braly Municipal Stadium; Florence, AL		W 36–14	8,247	
September 18	7:00 p.m.	at Alabama A&M*	No. 3	Milton Frank Stadium; Huntsville, AL		W 49–7	10,927	
September 25	7:00 p.m.	Delta State	No. 2	Braly Municipal Stadium; Florence, AL		W 58–17	8,117	
October 2	9:00 p.m.	at No. 3 Portland State*	No. 2	Civic Stadium; Portland, OR		W 44–32	22,136	
October 9	5:00 p.m.	at Mississippi College	No. 1	Robinson-Hale Stadium; Clinton, MS		W 38–28	6,123	
October 16	7:00 p.m.	Henderson State	No. 1	Braly Municipal Stadium; Florence, AL		W 17–0	6,423	
October 23	2:00 p.m.	at Central Arkansas	No. 1	Estes Stadium; Conway, AR		W 21–10	8,169	
October 30	3:00 p.m.	Livingston^{†}	No. 1	Braly Municipal Stadium; Florence, AL (rivalry)		W 65–15	5,149	
November 6	6:00 p.m.	at No. 18 Valdosta State	No. 1	Cleveland Field; Valdosta, GA		W 31–21	9,148	
November 13	1:30 p.m.	West Georgia	No. 1	Braly Municipal Stadium; Florence, AL		W 41–14	6,948	
November 20	1:00 p.m.	No. 14 Carson–Newman*	No. 1	Braly Municipal Stadium; Florence, AL (NCAA Division II First Round)		W 38–28	4,748	
November 27	1:00 p.m.	No. 3 Hampton*	No. 1	Braly Municipal Stadium; Florence, AL (NCAA Division II Quarterfinal)	WAAY-TV	W 45–20	5,349	
December 4	1:00 p.m.	No. 19 Texas A&M–Kingsville*	No. 1	Braly Municipal Stadium; Florence, AL (NCAA Division II Semifinal)		W 27–25	4,992	
December 11	12:30 p.m.	No. 4 IUP*	No. 1	Braly Municipal Stadium; Florence, AL (NCAA Division II Championship Game)	ESPN	W 41–34	15,631	
*Non-conference game; ^{†}Homecoming; Rankings from NCAA Division II Football Committee Poll released prior to the game; All times are in Central time

== Game summaries ==
=== Fort Valley State ===
Fort Valley State Wildcats vs. No. 2 North Alabama Lions (0-0) – Game summary

Quarter	1	2	3	4	Total
Wildcats	0	7	0	7	14
No. 2 Lions	6	13	3	14	36

at Braly Municipal Stadium • Florence, AL

- Date: September 4
- Game time: 7:00 p.m. CDT
- Game attendance: 8,247

Game information

First Quarter

- (14:47) UNA – Brian Satterfield 48-yard run (Jamie Stoddard kick failed) (Drive: 1 play, 48 yards, 0:13; UNA 6-0)

Second Quarter

- (14:56) UNA – Brian Satterfield 18-yard run (Cody Gross pass-for-two failed) (Drive: 5 plays, 80 yards, 2:01; UNA 12-0)
- (10:41) FVS – Bennie Nelson 2-yard run (Lindsey kick) (Drive: 10 plays, 47 yards, 4:15; UNA 12-7)
- (5:38) UNA – Michael Edwards 8-yard run (Jamie Stoddard kick) (Drive: 11 plays, 69 yards, 5:03; UNA 19-7)

Third Quarter

- (0:51) UNA – Jamie Stoddard 26-yard field goal (Drive: 16 plays, 79 yards, 5:59; UNA 22-7)

Fourth Quarter

- (10:51) UNA – Brian Satterfield 97-yard run (Drive: 2 plays, 99 yards, 0:53; UNA 29-7)
- (4:48) UNA – Anthony Brooks 1-yard run (Drive: 8 plays, 38 yards, 3:44; UNA 36-7)
- FVS – Luwon Penamon 9-yard pass from Hubert Hogan (Lindsey kick) (Drive: 5 plays, 57 yards, 1:39; UNA 36-14)

Statistics	FVS	UNA
First downs	17	22
Total yards	275	531
Rushing yards	163	506
Passing yards	34	112
Passing: Comp–Att–Int	11–22–2	3–7–0
Time of possession	28:54	31:06

Team	Category	Player	Statistics
Fort Valley State	Passing	Hubert Hogan	9/20, 95 yards, 1 TD, 2 INT
Fort Valley State	Rushing	Bennie Nelson	23 carries, 119 yards, 1 TD
Fort Valley State	Receiving	Luwon Penamon	6 receptions, 66 yards, 1 TD
North Alabama	Passing	Cody Gross	1/3, 19 yards
North Alabama	Rushing	Brian Satterfield	10 carries, 243 yards, 3 TD
North Alabama	Receiving	Demetrea Shelton	1 receptions, 19 yards

=== at Alabama A&M ===
No. 3 North Alabama Lions (1-0) vs. Alabama A&M Bulldogs – Game summary

Quarter	1	2	3	4	Total
No. 3 Lions	14	14	14	7	49
Bulldogs	0	0	0	7	7

at Milton Frank Stadium • Huntsville, AL

- Date: September 18
- Game time: 7:00 p.m. CDT
- Game attendance: 10,927

Game information

First Quarter

- (13:04) UNA – Brian Satterfield 1-yard run (Jamie Stoddard kick) (Drive: 3 plays, 11 yards, 0:50; UNA 7-0)
- (5:01) UNA – Brian Satterfield 1-yard run (Jamie Stoddard kick) (Drive: 9 plays, 75 yards, 5:01; UNA 14-0)

Second Quarter

- (10:39) UNA – Tyrone Rush 2-yard run (Jamie Stoddard kick) (Drive: 10 plays, 80 yards, 5:28; UNA 21-0)
- (4:29) UNA – Tyrone Rush 1-yard run (Jamie Stoddard kick) (Drive: 7 plays, 65 yards, 4:08; UNA 28-0)

Third Quarter

- (6:45) UNA – Demetrea Shelton 37-yard pass from Cody Gross (Jamie Stoddard kick) (Drive: 10 plays, 86 yards, 6:15; UNA 35-0)
- (2:31) UNA – Kenyatte Jones 9-yard run (Jamie Stoddard kick) (Drive: 10 plays, 74 yards, 5:33; UNA 42-0)

Fourth Quarter

- (12:48) A&M – Miguel Eldridge 11-yard pass from Jay Roberson (Lane Sutherland kick) (Drive: 12 plays, 78 yards, 4:42; UNA 42-7)
- (1:46) UNA – Kwame Felton 3-yard run (Chris Thorton kick) (Drive: 11 plays, 67 yards, 7:24; UNA 49-0)

Statistics	UNA	A&M
First downs	28	15
Total yards	490	214
Rushing yards	346	42
Passing yards	144	172
Passing: Comp–Att–Int	8–10–0	12–28–0
Time of possession	36:51	23:09

Team	Category	Player	Statistics
North Alabama	Passing	Cody Gross	7/7, 135 yards, 1 TD
North Alabama	Rushing	Tyrone Rush	15 carries, 88 yards, 2 TD
North Alabama	Receiving	Michael Edwards	4 receptions, 72 yards
Alabama A&M	Passing	Jay Roberson	12/28, 174 yards, 1 TD
Alabama A&M	Rushing	Jermaine Jackson	12 carries, 25 yards
Alabama A&M	Receiving	Miguel Eldridge	6 receptions, 104 yards, 1 TD

=== Delta State ===
Delta State Statesmen vs. No. 2 North Alabama Lions (2-0) – Game summary

Quarter	1	2	3	4	Total
Statesmen	3	14	0	0	17
No. 2 Lions	13	22	7	16	58

at Braly Municipal Stadium • Florence, AL

- Date: September 25
- Game time: 7:00 p.m. CDT
- Game attendance: 8,117

Game information

First Quarter

- (11:10) UNA – Brian Satterfield 43-yard run (Jamie Stoddard kick failed) (Drive: 4 plays, 72 yards, 1:50; UNA 6-0)
- (6:30) DSU– Steve Coker 38-yard field goal (Drive: 8 plays, 27 yards, 2:16; UNA 6-3)
- (2:14) UNA – Kenyatta Jones 3-yard run (Jamie Stoddard kick) (Drive: 8 plays, 80 yards, 4:16; UNA 13-3)

Second Quarter

- (12:39) DSU– Tommy Reed 36-yard pass from David Crowe (Steve Coker kick) (Drive: 6 plays, 63 yards, 1:58; UNA 13-10)
- (11:42) UNA – Tyrone Rush 20-yard run (Jamie Stoddard kick) (Drive: 3 plays, 52 yards, 0:57; UNA 20-10)
- (9:02) UNA – Cale Manley 20-yard run (Rush pass from Gross) (Drive: 7 plays, 59 yards, 2:07; UNA 28-10)
- (4:37) UNA – Tyrone Rush 1-yard run (Jamie Stoddard kick) (Drive: 9 plays, 64 yards, 3:25; UNA 35-10)
- (0:20) DSU– Carlos Bonner 1-yard pass from David Crowe (Steve Coker kick) (Drive: 9 plays, 70 yards, 4:17; UNA 35-17)

Third Quarter

- (9:03) UNA – Tyrone Rush 2-yard run (Jamie Stoddard kick) (Drive: 13 plays, 72 yards, 5:57; UNA 42-17)

Fourth Quarter

- (14:56) UNA – Cody Gross 7-yard run (Jamie Stoddard kick) (Drive: 5 plays, 26 yards, 2:55; UNA 49-17)
- (7:50) UNA – Kwame Felton 3-yard run (Jamie Stoddard kick) (Drive: 10 plays, 78 yards, 5:06; UNA 56-17)
- (6:06) UNA – Israel Raybon blocks punt for safety (UNA 58-17)

Statistics	DSU	UNA
First downs	15	30
Total yards	285	646
Rushing yards	121	550
Passing yards	164	96
Passing: Comp–Att–Int	18–41–1	4–10–2

Team	Category	Player	Statistics
Delta State	Passing	David Crowe	16/31, 143 yards, 2 TD, 1 INT
Delta State	Rushing	Greg Walker	14 carries, 83 yards
Delta State	Receiving	Tommy Reed	3 receptions, 54 yards, 1 TD
North Alabama	Passing	Cody Gross	3/7, 86 yards, 1 INT
North Alabama	Rushing	Tyrone Rush	22 carries, 248 yards, 3 TD
North Alabama	Receiving	Michael Edwards	1 receptions, 38 yards
