= 1993 Montana Grizzlies football team =

American college football season

1993 Montana Grizzlies football

Big Sky champion

NCAA Division I-AA First Round, L 48–49 vs. Delaware
- Conference: Big Sky Conference

Ranking
- Sports Network: No. 3
- Record: 10–2 (7–0 Big Sky)
- Head coach: Don Read (8th season)
- Offensive coordinator: Mick Dennehy (3rd season)
- Defensive coordinator: Jerome Souers (4th season)
- Home stadium: Washington–Grizzly Stadium

1993 Big Sky Conference football standings
	Conf.					Overall
Team	W		L		T	W		L		T
No. 3 Montana $^	7	–	0	–	0	10	–	2	–	0
No. 11 Idaho ^	5	–	2	–	0	11	–	3	–	0
No. 20 Eastern Washington	5	–	2	–	0	7	–	3	–	0
Montana State	4	–	3	–	0	7	–	4	–	0
Northern Arizona	3	–	4	–	0	7	–	4	–	0
Weber State	3	–	4	–	0	7	–	4	–	0
Boise State	1	–	6	–	0	3	–	8	–	0
Idaho State	0	–	7	–	0	0	–	11	–	0
$ – Conference champion; ^ – NCAA Division I-AA playoff participant; Rankings from The Sports Network poll

The 1993 Montana Grizzlies football team was an American football team that represented the University of Montana as a member of the Big Sky Conference during the 1993 NCAA Division I-AA football season. In their eighth year under head coach Don Read, the Grizzlies compiled an overall record of 10–2 with a mark of 7–0 in conference play, winning the Big Sky Title. Montana advanced to the NCAA Division I-AA Football Championship playoffs, where the Grizzlies lost to Delaware in the first round. Montana played home games at Washington–Grizzly Stadium in Missoula, Montana.

== Schedule ==
Date	Opponent	Rank	Site	Result	Attendance	Source
September 4	South Dakota State*	No. 22	Washington–Grizzly Stadium; Missoula, MT	W 52–48	11,366	
September 11	at Oregon*	No. 21	Autzen Stadium; Eugene, OR	L 30–35	33,183	
September 18	Idaho State	No. 19	Washington–Grizzly Stadium; Missoula, MT	W 28–16	11,583	
September 25	at Eastern Washington	No. 16	Woodward Field; Cheney, WA (rivalry)	W 35–20	5,970	
October 2	Boise State	No. 12	Washington–Grizzly Stadium; Missoula, MT	W 38–24	15,696	
October 9	Weber State	No. 12	Washington–Grizzly Stadium; Missoula, MT	W 45–17	10,180	
October 16	at Northern Arizona	No. 8	Walkup Skydome; Flagstaff, AZ	W 38–23	15,288	
October 23	Jacksonville State*	No. 8	Washington–Grizzly Stadium; Missoula, MT	W 37–7	11,561	
October 30	Sacramento State*	No. 4	Washington–Grizzly Stadium; Missoula, MT	W 54–7	9,321	
November 6	at No. 6 Idaho	No. 5	Kibbie Dome; Moscow, ID (Little Brown Stein)	W 54–34	15,054	
November 13	at Montana State	No. 5	Reno H. Sales Stadium; Bozeman, MT (rivalry)	W 42–30	15,197	
November 26	No. 18 Delaware*	No. 3	Washington–Grizzly Stadium; Missoula, MT (NCAA Division I-AA First Round)	L 48–49	11,271	
*Non-conference game; Rankings from The Sports Network Poll released prior to the game
