= 1993 Idaho State Bengals football team =

American college football season

1993 Idaho State Bengals football
- Conference: Big Sky Conference
- Record: 0–11, 2 wins forfeited (0–7 Big Sky)
- Head coach: Brian McNeely (2nd season)
- Offensive scheme: Pro-style
- Defensive coordinator: Kyle Whittingham (2nd season)
- Base defense: 4–3
- Home stadium: Holt Arena

1993 Big Sky Conference football standings
	Conf.					Overall
Team	W		L		T	W		L		T
No. 3 Montana $^	7	–	0	–	0	10	–	2	–	0
No. 11 Idaho ^	5	–	2	–	0	11	–	3	–	0
No. 20 Eastern Washington	5	–	2	–	0	7	–	3	–	0
Montana State	4	–	3	–	0	7	–	4	–	0
Northern Arizona	3	–	4	–	0	7	–	4	–	0
Weber State	3	–	4	–	0	7	–	4	–	0
Boise State	1	–	6	–	0	3	–	8	–	0
Idaho State	0	–	7	–	0	0	–	11	–	0
$ – Conference champion; ^ – NCAA Division I-AA playoff participant; Rankings from The Sports Network poll

The 1993 Idaho State Bengals football team represented Idaho State University as a member of the Big Sky Conference during the 1993 NCAA Division I-AA football season. Led by second-year head coach Brian McNeely, the Bengals compiled an overall record of 0–11, with a mark of 0–7 in conference play, and finished eighth in the Big Sky.

In July 1994, Idaho State was forced to forfeit their wins against Chadron State and Mesa State by the NCAA as a result of playing an ineligible player.

== Schedule ==
Date	Opponent	Site	Result	Attendance	Source
September 4	Chadron State*	Holt Arena; Pocatello, ID	L 52–3 (forfeit)		
September 11	at Portland State*	Civic Stadium; Portland, OR	L 7–21	13,014	
September 18	at No. 19 Montana	Washington–Grizzly Stadium; Missoula, MT	L 16–28	11,583	
September 25	Northern Arizona	Holt Arena; Pocatello, ID	L 15–32	7,455	
October 2	Mesa State*	Holt Arena; Pocatello, ID	L 59–10 (forfeit)		
October 9	No. 1 Idaho	Holt Arena; Pocatello, ID (rivalry)	L 27–56	11,234	
October 16	Montana State	Holt Arena; Pocatello, ID	L 24–25	6,227	
October 23	at Boise State	Bronco Stadium; Boise, ID	L 27–34	17,863	
October 30	at Eastern Washington	Woodward Field; Cheney, WA	L 7–38	3,453	
November 6	at New Mexico*	University Stadium; Albuquerque, NM	L 13–39	22,049	
November 13	Weber State	Holt Arena; Pocatello, ID	L 17–21	6,222	
*Non-conference game; Rankings from The Sports Network Poll released prior to the game
