= 1993 Eastern Washington Eagles football team =

American college football season

1993 Eastern Washington Eagles football
- Conference: Big Sky Conference

Ranking
- Sports Network: No. 20
- Record: 7–3 (5–2 Big Sky)
- Head coach: Dick Zornes (15th season)
- Home stadium: Woodward Field

1993 Big Sky Conference football standings
	Conf.					Overall
Team	W		L		T	W		L		T
No. 3 Montana $^	7	–	0	–	0	10	–	2	–	0
No. 11 Idaho ^	5	–	2	–	0	11	–	3	–	0
No. 20 Eastern Washington	5	–	2	–	0	7	–	3	–	0
Montana State	4	–	3	–	0	7	–	4	–	0
Northern Arizona	3	–	4	–	0	7	–	4	–	0
Weber State	3	–	4	–	0	7	–	4	–	0
Boise State	1	–	6	–	0	3	–	8	–	0
Idaho State	0	–	7	–	0	0	–	11	–	0
$ – Conference champion; ^ – NCAA Division I-AA playoff participant; Rankings from The Sports Network poll

The 1993 Eastern Washington Eagles football team represented Eastern Washington University as a member of the Big Sky Conference during the 1993 NCAA Division I-AA football season. Led by 15th-year head coach Dick Zornes, the Eagles compiled a 7–3 overall record and a 5–2 mark in conference play, finishing tied for second in the Big Sky.

== Schedule ==
Date	Opponent	Site	Result	Attendance	Source
September 4	No. 9 Northeast Louisiana*	Woodward Field; Cheney, WA	L 13–34	3,596	
September 18	at Sacramento State*	Hornet Stadium; Sacramento, CA	W 48–7	2,126	
September 25	No. 16 Montana	Woodward Field; Cheney, WA (rivalry)	L 20–35	5,970	
October 2	at Weber State	Wildcat Stadium; Ogden, UT	W 36–22		
October 9	Portland State*	Woodward Field; Cheney, WA	W 38–21	4,730	
October 16	at No. 1 Idaho	Kibbie Dome; Moscow, ID	L 10–49	11,800	
October 23	No. 23 Northern Arizona	Woodward Field; Cheney, WA	W 38–26		
October 30	Idaho State	Woodward Field; Cheney, WA	W 38–7	3,453	
November 6	at No. 19 Montana State	Sales Stadium; Bozeman, MT	W 16–7	8,147	
November 13	at Boise State	Bronco Stadium; Boise, ID	W 28–17	10,238	
*Non-conference game; Rankings from The Sports Network Poll released prior to the game
