= 1993 Montana State Bobcats football team =

American college football season

1993 Montana State Bobcats football
- Conference: Big Sky Conference
- Record: 7–4 (4–3 Big Sky)
- Head coach: Cliff Hysell (2nd season)
- Home stadium: Sales Stadium

1993 Big Sky Conference football standings
| | Conf. | | | | | Overall |
| Team | W | | L | | T | W | | L | | T |
|---|---|---|---|---|---|---|---|---|---|---|
| No. 3 Montana $^ | 7 | – | 0 | – | 0 | 10 | – | 2 | – | 0 |
| No. 11 Idaho ^ | 5 | – | 2 | – | 0 | 11 | – | 3 | – | 0 |
| No. 20 Eastern Washington | 5 | – | 2 | – | 0 | 7 | – | 3 | – | 0 |
| Montana State | 4 | – | 3 | – | 0 | 7 | – | 4 | – | 0 |
| Northern Arizona | 3 | – | 4 | – | 0 | 7 | – | 4 | – | 0 |
| Weber State | 3 | – | 4 | – | 0 | 7 | – | 4 | – | 0 |
| Boise State | 1 | – | 6 | – | 0 | 3 | – | 8 | – | 0 |
| Idaho State | 0 | – | 7 | – | 0 | 0 | – | 11 | – | 0 |
$ – Conference champion; ^ – NCAA Division I-AA playoff participant; Rankings from The Sports Network poll

The 1993 Montana State Bobcats football team was an American football team that represented Montana State University in the Big Sky Conference during the 1993 NCAA Division I-AA football season. In their second season under head coach Cliff Hysell, the Bobcats compiled a 7–4 record (4–3 against Big Sky opponents) and finished fourth in the Big Sky.

== Schedule ==
| Date | Opponent | Rank | Site | Result | Attendance | Source |
|---|---|---|---|---|---|---|
| September 4 | at No. 24 Western Illinois* | | Hanson Field; Macomb, IL | W 29–16 | 8,309 | |
| September 11 | at Washington State* | | Martin Stadium; Pullman, WA | L 14–54 | 19,068 | |
| September 18 | Fort Lewis* | | Sales Stadium; Bozeman, MT | W 58–20 | 9,127 | |
| September 25 | Weber State^{†} | | Sales Stadium; Bozeman, MT | W 14–10 | 11,227 | |
| October 2 | at Northern Arizona | | Walkup Skydome; Flagstaff, AZ | L 20–23 | 14,022 | |
| October 9 | Southern Utah* | | Sales Stadium; Bozeman, MT | W 32–30 | 3,897 | |
| October 16 | at Idaho State | | Holt Arena; Pocatello, ID | W 25–24 | 6,227 | |
| October 23 | No. 1 Idaho | | Sales Stadium; Bozeman, MT | W 40–35 | 10,957 | |
| October 30 | at Boise State | No. 24 | Bronco Stadium; Boise, ID | W 42–21 | 15,458 | |
| November 6 | Eastern Washington | No. 19 | Sales Stadium; Bozeman, MT | L 7–16 | 8,147 | |
| November 13 | No. 5 Montana | | Sales Stadium; Bozeman, MT (rivalry) | L 30–42 | 15,000 | |
*Non-conference game; ^{†}Homecoming; Rankings from The Sports Network Poll released prior to the game
