= 1993 UC Davis Aggies football team =

American college football season

1993 UC Davis Aggies football

AWC co-champion

NCAA Division II Quarterfinal, L 28–51 vs. Texas A&M–Kingsville
- Conference: American West Conference
- Record: 10–2 (3–1 AWC)
- Head coach: Bob Biggs (1st season)
- Offensive coordinator: Mike Moroski (1st season)
- Home stadium: Toomey Field

1993 American West Conference football standings
	Conf.					Overall
Team	W		L		T	W		L		T
No. 7 UC Davis +^	3	–	1	–	0	10	–	2	–	0
Southern Utah +	3	–	1	–	0	3	–	7	–	1
Sacramento State	2	–	2	–	0	4	–	6	–	0
Cal Poly	1	–	3	–	0	6	–	4	–	0
Cal State Northridge	1	–	3	–	0	4	–	6	–	0
+ – Conference co-champions; ^ – NCAA Division II playoff participant; Although UC Davis was a conference member, they participated in NCAA Division II polls and postseason.; Rankings from NCAA Division II Football Committee poll

The 1993 UC Davis football team represented the University of California, Davis as a member of the American West Conference (AWC) during the 1993 NCAA Division II football season. Led by first-year head coach Bob Biggs, UC Davis compiled an overall record of 10–2 with a mark of 3–1 in conference play, sharing the AWC title with Southern Utah. 1993 was the 24th consecutive winning season for the Aggies. UC Davis advanced to the NCAA Division II Football Championship playoffs, where they beat Fort Hays State in the first round before falling to Texas A&M–Kingsville in the quarterfinals. The team outscored its opponents 460 to 297 for the season. The Aggies played home games at Toomey Field in Davis, California.

This was the first and only season that UC Davis competed in the AWC. The other four teams in the conference competed at the NCAA Division I-AA level. Apparently, this was due to a decision by the program not to offer scholarships. In 1994, UC Davis became an NCAA Division II independent.

== Schedule ==
Date	Time	Opponent	Rank	Site	Result	Attendance	Source
September 11		Cal Poly		Toomey Field; Davis, CA (rivalry)	W 37–26	4,375	
September 18		Cal State Hayward*	No. 12	Toomey Field; Davis, CA	W 52–13	3,400–3,750	
September 25		at Southern Utah	No. 10	Coliseum of Southern Utah; Cedar City, UT	L 27–28	5,829	
October 2		Humboldt State*	No. 14	Toomey Field; Davis, CA	W 45–9	7,300	
October 9		at Chico State*	No. 17	University Stadium; Chico, CA	W 35–10	1,638–4,863	
October 16		at Sonoma State*	No. 12	Cossacks Stadium (Note: Cossacks Stadium was renamed in 2002 to Seawolf Stadium when the University changed the name of the mascot to Seawolves.); Rohnert Park, CA	W 31–21	1,629	
October 23		Cal State Northridge	No. 9	Toomey Field; Davis, CA	W 48–38	7,200	
October 30		at Saint Mary's*	No. 8	Saint Mary's Stadium; Moraga, CA	W 28–21	5,109	
November 6		San Francisco State*	No. 8	Toomey Field; Davis, CA	W 45–14	4,400	
November 13		at Sacramento State	No. 7	Hornet Stadium; Sacramento, CA (Causeway Classic)	W 47–32	13,137	
November 20	1:00 p.m.	Fort Hays State*	No. 7	Toomey Field; Davis, CA (NCAA Division II First Round)	W 37–34	5,100	
November 27	1:00 p.m.	No. 19 Texas A&M–Kingsville*	No. 7	Toomey Field; Davis, CA (NCAA Division II Quarterfinal)	L 28–51		
*Non-conference game; Rankings from NCAA Division II Football Committee Poll released prior to the game; All times are in Pacific time
