= 1993 Boise State Broncos football team =

American college football season

1993 Boise State Broncos football
- Conference: Big Sky Conference
- Record: 3–8 (1–6 Big Sky)
- Head coach: Pokey Allen (1st season)
- Offensive coordinator: Al Borges (1st season)
- Defensive coordinator: Tom Mason (1st season)
- Home stadium: Bronco Stadium

1993 Big Sky Conference football standings
	Conf.					Overall
Team	W		L		T	W		L		T
No. 3 Montana $^	7	–	0	–	0	10	–	2	–	0
No. 11 Idaho ^	5	–	2	–	0	11	–	3	–	0
No. 20 Eastern Washington	5	–	2	–	0	7	–	3	–	0
Montana State	4	–	3	–	0	7	–	4	–	0
Northern Arizona	3	–	4	–	0	7	–	4	–	0
Weber State	3	–	4	–	0	7	–	4	–	0
Boise State	1	–	6	–	0	3	–	8	–	0
Idaho State	0	–	7	–	0	0	–	11	–	0
$ – Conference champion; ^ – NCAA Division I-AA playoff participant; Rankings from The Sports Network poll

The 1993 Boise State Broncos football team represented Boise State University in the 1993 NCAA Division I-AA football season. The Broncos competed in the Big Sky Conference and played their home games on campus at Bronco Stadium in Boise, Idaho. Led by first-year head coach Pokey Allen, Boise State finished the season 3–8 overall and 1–6 in conference.

Allen was previously the head coach at Portland State (of Division II), which had easily defeated BSU in Boise in 1992.

Senior quarterback Travis Stuart, the starter in 1992, was declared academically ineligible in mid-August and missed the season. Sophomore Danny Langsdorf was the opening day starter, splitting time with junior college transfer Lee Schrack.

== Schedule ==
Date	Time	Opponent	Site	Result	Attendance	Source
September 4		Rhode Island*	Bronco Stadium; Boise, ID	W 31–10	17,618	
September 11		at Nevada*	Mackay Stadium; Reno, NV (rivalry)	L 10–38	28,523	
September 18		Northeastern*	Bronco Stadium; Boise, ID	W 27–13	17,355	
September 25		No. 18 Stephen F. Austin*	Bronco Stadium; Boise, ID	L 7–30	19,070	
October 2		at No. 12 Montana	Washington–Grizzly Stadium; Missoula, MT	L 24–38	15,696	
October 9		Northern Arizona	Bronco Stadium; Boise, ID	L 9–23	18,879	
October 16		at Weber State	Wildcat Stadium; Ogden, UT	L 14–21	3,971	
October 23		Idaho State	Bronco Stadium; Boise, ID	W 34–27	17,863	
October 30		No. 24 Montana State	Bronco Stadium; Boise, ID	L 21–42	15,458	
November 13	12:05 pm	Eastern Washington	Bronco Stadium; Boise, ID	L 17–28	10,238	
November 20	2:05 pm	at No. 11 Idaho	Kibbie Dome; Moscow, ID (rivalry)	L 16–49	15,085	
*Non-conference game; Rankings from The Sports Network Poll released prior to the game; All times are in Mountain time
