= 1993 Cal State Northridge Matadors football team =

American college football season

1993 Cal State Northridge Matadors football
- Conference: American West Conference
- Record: 4–6 (1–3 AWC)
- Head coach: Bob Burt (8th season)
- Defensive coordinator: Mark Banker (11th season)
- Home stadium: North Campus Stadium

1993 American West Conference football standings
	Conf.					Overall
Team	W		L		T	W		L		T
No. 7 UC Davis +^	3	–	1	–	0	10	–	2	–	0
Southern Utah +	3	–	1	–	0	3	–	7	–	1
Sacramento State	2	–	2	–	0	4	–	6	–	0
Cal Poly	1	–	3	–	0	6	–	4	–	0
Cal State Northridge	1	–	3	–	0	4	–	6	–	0
+ – Conference co-champions; ^ – NCAA Division II playoff participant; Although UC Davis was a conference member, they participated in NCAA Division II polls and postseason.; Rankings from NCAA Division II Football Committee poll

The 1993 Cal State Northridge Matadors football team represented California State University, Northridge as a member of the American West Conference (AWC) during the 1993 NCAA Division I-AA football season. This was the first season that the Matadors competed at the NCAA Division I-AA level, as they had previously been at the NCAA Division II level. Led by eighth-year head coach Bob Burt, Cal State Northridge compiled an overall record of 4–6 with a mark of 1–3 in conference play, tying for fourth place in the AWC. The team outscored its opponents 229 to 222 for the season. The Matadors played home games at North Campus Stadium in Northridge, California.

== Schedule ==
Date	Opponent	Site	Result	Attendance	Source
September 4	at San Diego State*	Jack Murphy Stadium; San Diego, CA	L 17–34	40,872	
September 11	at Weber State*	Wildcat Stadium; Ogden, UT	L 12–27	6,337	
September 18	at Northern Arizona*	Walkup Skydome; Flagstaff, AZ	L 9–23	7,803	
September 25	Sonoma State*	North Campus Stadium; Northridge, CA	W 39–0	2,867	
October 9	at UNLV*	Sam Boyd Silver Bowl; Whitney, NV	W 24–18	10,380	
October 16	Sacramento State	North Campus Stadium; Northridge, CA	L 30–31	3,512	
October 23	at No. 9 UC Davis	Toomey Field; Davis, CA	L 38–48	7,200	
October 30	Chico State*	North Campus Stadium; Northridge, CA	W 21–7	4,576	
November 6	at Cal Poly	Mustang Stadium; San Luis Obispo, CA	W 22–14	5,654	
November 13	Southern Utah	North Campus Stadium; Northridge, CA	L 17–20		
*Non-conference game; Rankings from NCAA Division II Football Committee Poll released prior to the game
