= 1993 North Texas Mean Green football team =

American college football season

1993 North Texas Mean Green football
- Conference: Southland Conference
- Record: 4–7 (2–5 Southland)
- Head coach: Dennis Parker (3rd season)
- Home stadium: Fouts Field

1993 Southland Conference football standings
	Conf.					Overall
Team	W		L		T	W		L		T
No. 5 McNeese State $^	7	–	0	–	0	10	–	3	–	0
No. 4 NE Louisiana ^	6	–	1	–	0	9	–	3	–	0
No. 14 Stephen F. Austin ^	5	–	2	–	0	8	–	4	–	0
Northwestern State	3	–	4	–	0	5	–	6	–	0
Sam Houston State	2	–	5	–	0	4	–	7	–	0
North Texas	2	–	5	–	0	4	–	7	–	0
Nicholls State	2	–	5	–	0	3	–	8	–	0
SW Texas State	1	–	6	–	0	2	–	9	–	0
$ – Conference champion; ^ – NCAA Division I-AA playoff participant; Rankings from The Sports Network poll

The 1993 North Texas Mean Green football team was an American football team that represented the University of North Texas during the 1993 NCAA Division I-AA football season as a member of the Southland Conference. In their third year under head coach Dennis Parker, the team compiled a 4–7 record.

== Schedule ==
Date	Opponent	Site	Result	Attendance	Source
September 4	at No. 9 (I-A) Nebraska*	Memorial Stadium; Lincoln, NE	L 14–76	75,614	
September 11	at Northern Arizona*	Walkup Skydome; Flagstaff, AZ	L 23–24	6,295	
September 18	Southwest Missouri State*	Fouts Field; Denton, TX	W 34–33		
September 25	Abilene Christian*	Fouts Field; Denton, TX	W 33–13	7,109	
October 9	Southwest Texas State^{†}	Fouts Field; Denton, TX	W 35–28	10,447	
October 16	at McNeese State	Cowboy Stadium; Lake Charles, LA	L 17–18		
October 23	Northwestern State	Fouts Field; Denton, TX	L 37–38	13,994	
October 30	at Sam Houston State	Bowers Stadium; Huntsville, TX	L 14–24		
November 6	Stephen F. Austin	Fouts Field; Denton, TX	L 27–29	7,129	
November 13	Nicholls State	Fouts Field; Denton, TX	W 63–21	5,043	
November 20	at No. 4 Northeast Louisiana	Malone Stadium; Monroe, LA	L 31–61		
*Non-conference game; ^{†}Homecoming; Rankings from NCAA Division I-AA Football Committee Poll released prior to the game
