= 1993 Idaho Vandals football team =

American college football season

1993 Idaho Vandals football

NCAA Division I-AA Semifinal, L 16–35 at Youngstown State
- Conference: Big Sky Conference

Ranking
- Sports Network: No. 11
- Record: 11–3 (5–2 Big Sky)
- Head coach: John L. Smith (5th season)
- Offensive coordinator: Scott Linehan (2nd season)
- Defensive coordinator: Craig Bray (4th season)
- Home stadium: Kibbie Dome

1993 Big Sky Conference football standings
	Conf.					Overall
Team	W		L		T	W		L		T
No. 3 Montana $^	7	–	0	–	0	10	–	2	–	0
No. 11 Idaho ^	5	–	2	–	0	11	–	3	–	0
No. 20 Eastern Washington	5	–	2	–	0	7	–	3	–	0
Montana State	4	–	3	–	0	7	–	4	–	0
Northern Arizona	3	–	4	–	0	7	–	4	–	0
Weber State	3	–	4	–	0	7	–	4	–	0
Boise State	1	–	6	–	0	3	–	8	–	0
Idaho State	0	–	7	–	0	0	–	11	–	0
$ – Conference champion; ^ – NCAA Division I-AA playoff participant; Rankings from The Sports Network poll

The 1993 Idaho Vandals football team represented the University of Idaho in the 1993 NCAA Division I-AA football season. The Vandals, led by fifth-year head coach John L. Smith, were members of the Big Sky Conference and played their home games at the Kibbie Dome, an indoor facility on campus in Moscow, Idaho.

Led by senior All-American quarterback Doug Nussmeier, Idaho finished the regular season at 9–2 and 5–2 in the Big Sky. The Vandals made the Division I-AA playoffs and advanced to the semifinals. For three weeks in October, Idaho was at the top of the poll in Division I-AA.

== Notable games ==
Favored to repeat as conference champions, Idaho was ranked sixth in the preseason I-AA poll, and for the second consecutive year, they visited a Division I-A opponent from the WAC and won. This time it was over Utah in Salt Lake City in early October, and the Vandals were rewarded with the top ranking in I-AA. In the regular season finale, the Vandals defeated rival Boise State for the twelfth consecutive year, a 49–16 win in Moscow. Two weeks earlier, visiting Montana won the Little Brown Stein for the third consecutive year, and went undefeated in conference play. An upset loss in Bozeman to Montana State on October 23 ended the Vandals' run at the top of the national poll.

== Division I-AA playoffs ==
For the eighth time in nine seasons, the Vandals made the 16-team I-AA playoffs and were ranked eleventh in the regular season's final poll. Idaho went on the road and defeated #4 Northeast Louisiana, then beat undefeated Boston University in the Kibbie Dome. In the semifinals in Ohio at Youngstown State, the Vandals fell 35–16 to Jim Tressel's Penguins, the eventual national champions.

== Notable players and coaches ==
Senior quarterback Nussmeier, a four-year starter (1990–93), was an All-American and won the Walter Payton Award. He was selected by the New Orleans Saints in the 1994 NFL draft and played several seasons as a reserve prior to starting his career as a coach. Redshirt freshman defensive end Ryan Phillips was also a four-year starter; he moved to outside linebacker as a senior in 1996, and was selected in the third round of the 1997 NFL draft by the New York Giants. He played five seasons in the NFL, including Super Bowl XXXV in January 2001.

Former Vandal quarterback Scott Linehan, a future NFL head coach, was the offensive coordinator and two future Vandal head coaches were on the staff: Nick Holt (defensive line) and Paul Petrino (receivers).

== Schedule ==
Date	Time	Opponent	Rank	Site	TV	Result	Attendance	Source
September 2	5:00 pm	at Stephen F. Austin*	No. 6	Homer Bryce Stadium; Nacogdoches, TX	PSN	W 38–30	11,124	
September 11	1:05 pm	Southwest Texas State*	No. 5	Kibbie Dome; Moscow, ID		W 66–38	9,100	
September 18	5:05 pm	at Weber State	No. 4	Wildcat Stadium; Ogden, UT		W 56–0	6,094	
October 2	7:05 pm	at Utah*	No. 2	Robert Rice Stadium; Salt Lake City, UT		W 28–17	25,326	
October 9	1:00 pm	at Idaho State	No. 1	Holt Arena; Pocatello, ID (rivalry)		W 56–27	11,234	
October 16	11:07 am	Eastern Washington	No. 1	Kibbie Dome; Moscow, ID	PSN	W 49–10	11,800	
October 23	11:05 am	at Montana State	No. 1	Reno H. Sales Stadium; Bozeman, MT		L 35–40	10,957	
October 30	6:05 pm	at Northern Arizona	No. 7	Walkup Skydome; Flagstaff, AZ		W 34–27	8,365	
November 6	1:05 pm	No. 5 Montana	No. 6	Kibbie Dome; Moscow, ID (Little Brown Stein)		L 34–54	15,054	
November 13	1:05 pm	Lehigh*^{†}	No. 11	Kibbie Dome; Moscow, ID		W 77–14	12,132	
November 20	1:05 pm	Boise State	No. 11	Kibbie Dome; Moscow, ID (rivalry)	KTVB	W 49–16	15,085	
November 27	4:00 pm	at No. 4 Northeast Louisiana*	No. 11	Malone Stadium; Monroe, LA (NCAA Division I-AA First Round)		W 34–31	10,000	
December 4	1:05 pm	No. 6 Boston University*	No. 11	Kibbie Dome; Moscow, ID (NCAA Division I-AA Quarterfinal)		W 21–14	8,800	
December 11	9:00 am	at No. 7 Youngstown State*	No. 11	Stambaugh Stadium; Youngstown, OH (NCAA Division Semifinal)	PSN	L 16–35	9,644	
*Non-conference game; ^{†}Homecoming; Rankings from The Sports Network Poll released prior to the game; All times are in Pacific time

== Roster ==
1993 Idaho Vandals football team roster
Players			Coaches
Offense: Pos. / # / Name / Class; QB / 13 / Doug Nussmeier / Sr	Defense: Pos. / # / Name / Class	Special teams: Pos. / # / Name / Class	Head coach: John L. Smith; Coordinators/assistant coaches: Mike Cox (LB); Legend: (C) Team captain; (S) Suspended; (I) Ineligible; Injured; Redshirt

== NFL draft ==
One Vandal senior was selected in the 1994 NFL draft, which was seven rounds (222 selections).

Player	Position	Round	Overall	Franchise
Doug Nussmeier	QB	4th	116	New Orleans Saints
