= Jim Bob Helduser =

American football player and coach (1957–2010)

Biographical details
- Born: February 27, 1957; Groves, Texas, U.S.
- Died: February 26, 2010 (aged 52); College Station, Texas, U.S.

Playing career
- 1976–1978: Texas Lutheran

Coaching career (HC unless noted)
- 1979–1983: Rice (TE/WR)
- 1986–1991: Southwest Texas State (QB/WR/OL)
- 1992–1996: Southwest Texas State
- 1998–2000: TCU (OL)
- 2001–2002: Alabama (OL)
- 2003–2007: Texas A&M (OL)

Head coaching record
- Overall: 20–34–1

Jim Bob Helduser (February 27, 1957 – February 26, 2010) was an American football coach whose last coaching role was as an assistant coach for the Bryan High School Vikings football team. His last college coaching position was as the offensive line coach at Texas A&M University (2003–2007).

== Early life ==
Helduser was a native of Groves, Texas and a 1975 graduate of Port Neches–Groves High School. He attended Texas Lutheran University in Seguin, where he graduated summa cum laude in 1979 with a degree in biology, before earning a master's degree in educational administration at Southwest Texas State University in San Marcos.

== Coaching career ==
His first coaching experience was at Alief Elsik High School in Houston. He then became an assistant to Ray Alborn at Rice University. Following Alborn's dismissal in 1983, Helduser dropped out of the collegiate coaching ranks for a couple of years.

In 1986, he was hired by John O'Hara to coach the quarterbacks, wide receiver, and offensive linemen at Southwest Texas State University, and stayed on in that position when O'Hara was replaced in 1990 by Dennis Franchione. Altogether, Helduser spent 11 seasons coaching at Southwest Texas State University. He assumed the role of head coach when Franchione left after the 1991 season, and remained in that position until 1996. In five seasons, he compiled a 20–34–1 total record. He was replaced by Bob DeBesse, with whom he later coached at Texas A&M University.

After one year as head coach at Lake Travis High School in Austin, Helduser was approached by Franchione to join his staff at Texas Christian University as offensive line coach. His job was coaching the offensive line blocking for future NFL Hall of Fame running back LaDainian Tomlinson. After an 11–1 winning season at Texas Christian University and two Western Athletic Conference championships, Helduser left with Franchione to coach at the University of Alabama (ending in a 10–3 season) and later, Texas A&M University. In his collegiate coaching career he produced many nationally recognized and NFL athletes and was renowned for his experience in recruiting. He left Texas A&M in 2007 to become offensive coordinator for Bryan High School in Bryan, Texas. He retired from football coaching after the 2009 Bryan Vikings football season.

== Death ==
Helduser died on February 26, 2010, at his home in College Station, Texas, after a battle with colon cancer. He was survived by his wife, Janet Wiegman Helduser of San Antonio, Texas, son, Brant, and daughters, Kylene and Jenna.

== Head coaching record ==
Year	Team	Overall	Conference	Standing	Bowl/playoffs
Southwest Texas State Bobcats (Southland Conference) (1992–1996)
1992	Southwest Texas State	5–5–1	2–4–1	6th	
1993	Southwest Texas State	2–9	1–6	8th	
1994	Southwest Texas State	4–7	1–5	7th	
1995	Southwest Texas State	4–7	2–3	T–3rd	
1996	Southwest Texas State	5–6	2–4	6th	
Southwest Texas State:		20–34–1	8–22–1		
Total:		20–34–1			
