= 1993 Northern Arizona Lumberjacks football team =

American college football season

1993 Northern Arizona Lumberjacks football
- Conference: Big Sky Conference
- Record: 7–4 (3–4 Big Sky)
- Head coach: Steve Axman (4th season)
- Home stadium: Walkup Skydome

1993 Big Sky Conference football standings
	Conf.					Overall
Team	W		L		T	W		L		T
No. 3 Montana $^	7	–	0	–	0	10	–	2	–	0
No. 11 Idaho ^	5	–	2	–	0	11	–	3	–	0
No. 20 Eastern Washington	5	–	2	–	0	7	–	3	–	0
Montana State	4	–	3	–	0	7	–	4	–	0
Northern Arizona	3	–	4	–	0	7	–	4	–	0
Weber State	3	–	4	–	0	7	–	4	–	0
Boise State	1	–	6	–	0	3	–	8	–	0
Idaho State	0	–	7	–	0	0	–	11	–	0
$ – Conference champion; ^ – NCAA Division I-AA playoff participant; Rankings from The Sports Network poll

The 1993 Northern Arizona Lumberjacks football team represented Northern Arizona University as a member of the Big Sky Conference during the 1993 NCAA Division I-AA football season. Led by fourth-year head coach Steve Axman, the Lumberjacks compiled an overall record of 7–4, with a mark of 3–4 in conference play, and finished tied for fifth in the Big Sky.

== Schedule ==
Date	Opponent	Rank	Site	Result	Attendance	Source
September 4	at Southern Utah*		Coliseum of Southern Utah; Cedar City, UT	W 31–27	5,123	
September 11	North Texas*		Walkup Skydome; Flagstaff, AZ	W 24–23	6,295	
September 18	Cal State Northridge*		Walkup Skydome; Flagstaff, AZ	W 23–9	7,803	
September 25	at Idaho State		Holt Arena; Pocatello, ID	W 32–15	7,455	
October 2	Montana State		Walkup Skydome; Flagstaff, AZ	W 23–20	14,022	
October 9	at Boise State	No. 24	Bronco Stadium; Boise, ID	W 23–9	18,879	
October 16	No. 8 Montana	No. 20	Walkup Skydome; Flagstaff, AZ	L 23–38	15,288	
October 23	at Eastern Washington	No. 23	Woodward Field; Cheney, WA	L 26–38		
October 30	No. 7 Idaho		Walkup Skydome; Flagstaff, AZ	L 27–34	8,365	
November 6	at Weber State		Wildcat Stadium; Ogden, UT	L 28–67	3,941	
November 13	Valparaiso*		Walkup Skydome; Flagstaff, AZ	W 55–13	5,009	
*Non-conference game; Rankings from The Sports Network Poll released prior to the game
