= 1995 American West Conference men's basketball tournament =

- Classification: Division I
- Season: 1994–95
- Teams: 4
- Site: Centrum Center; Cedar City, Utah

The 1995 American West Conference men's basketball tournament was held March 10–11, 1995, at the Centrum Center in Cedar City, Utah. It was the first men's basketball tournament for the conference, which first sponsored men's basketball during the 1994–95 season. The tournament champion did not receive an automatic bid to the 1995 NCAA tournament.

1994–95 American West Conference men's basketball standings
	Conf.				Overall
Team	W		L	PCT	W		L	PCT
Southern Utah†	6	–	0	1.000	17	–	11	.607
Cal State Northridge	4	–	2	.667	8	–	20	.286
Sacramento State	2	–	4	.333	6	–	21	.222
Cal Poly	0	–	6	.000	1	–	26	.037
† 1995 American West tournament winner Rankings from AP poll

== Bracket ==
Semifinals; March 10, 1995
1	Southern Utah	93
4	Cal Poly	63
2	Cal State Northridge	86
3	Sacramento State	81

Championship game March 11, 1995
1	Southern Utah	83
2	Cal State Northridge	82
