= 1993 Sacramento State Hornets football team =

American college football season

1993 Sacramento State Hornets football
- Conference: American West Conference
- Record: 4–6 (2–2 AWC)
- Head coach: Mike Clemons (1st season)
- Home stadium: Hornet Stadium

1993 American West Conference football standings
	Conf.					Overall
Team	W		L		T	W		L		T
No. 7 UC Davis +^	3	–	1	–	0	10	–	2	–	0
Southern Utah +	3	–	1	–	0	3	–	7	–	1
Sacramento State	2	–	2	–	0	4	–	6	–	0
Cal Poly	1	–	3	–	0	6	–	4	–	0
Cal State Northridge	1	–	3	–	0	4	–	6	–	0
+ – Conference co-champions; ^ – NCAA Division II playoff participant; Although UC Davis was a conference member, they participated in NCAA Division II polls and postseason.; Rankings from NCAA Division II Football Committee poll

The 1993 Sacramento State Hornets football team represented California State University, Sacramento as a member of the American West Conference (AWC) during the 1993 NCAA Division I-AA football season. Led by first-year head coach Mike Clemons, Sacramento State compiled an overall record of 4–6 with a mark of 2–2 in conference play, placing third in the AWC. The team was outscored by its opponents 319 to 232 for the season. The Hornets played home games at Hornet Stadium in Sacramento, California.

This was the first season that Sacramento State competed at the NCAA Division I-AA level, as they had previously played at the NCAA Division II level from 1973 to 1992. The Hornets has been members of the Western Football Conference (WFC), which folded after the 1992 season.

== Schedule ==
Date	Opponent	Site	Result	Attendance	Source
September 3	Cal State Hayward*	Hornet Stadium; Sacramento, CA	W 34–17	2,041–5,350	
September 11	at San Francisco State*	Cox Stadium; San Francisco, CA	W 49–10	1,072	
September 18	Eastern Washington*	Hornet Stadium; Sacramento, CA	L 7–48	2,126	
September 25	at Pacific (CA)*	Stagg Memorial Stadium; Stockton, CA	L 6–30	12,063	
October 9	Saint Mary's*	Hornet Stadium; Sacramento, CA	L 14–27	3,355	
October 16	at Cal State Northridge	North Campus Stadium; Northridge, CA	W 31–30	3,512	
October 23	at No. 16 (D-II) Cal Poly	Mustang Stadium; San Luis Obispo, CA	W 35–33	6,527	
October 30	at No. 4 Montana*	Washington–Grizzly Stadium; Missoula, MT	L 7–54	9,321	
November 13	No. 7 (D-II) UC Davis	Hornet Stadium; Sacramento, CA (Causeway Classic)	L 32–47	13,137	
November 20	Southern Utah	Hornet Stadium; Sacramento, CA	L 17–23	1,562	
*Non-conference game; Rankings from The Sports Network Poll released prior to the game
