= American West Conference =

College athletic conference in the United States

- Association: NCAA
- Founded: 1993
- Folded: 1996
- Commissioner: Vic Buccola
- Division: Division I
- Subdivision: I-AA
- No. of teams: 4 (final) 5 (total)
- Region: Western United States

Locations
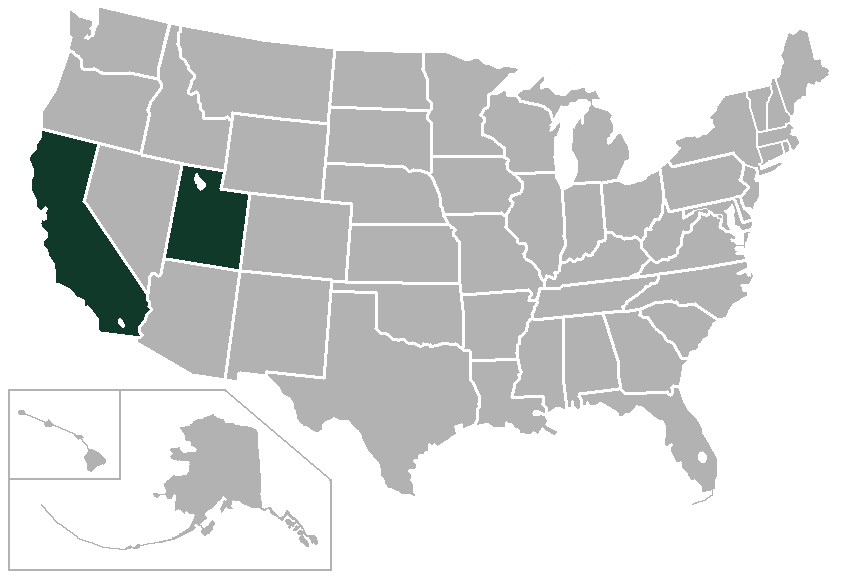

The American West Conference (AWC) was a college athletic conference in the United States from 1993 to 1996. It consisted of schools in California and Utah. The charter members of the conference were California Polytechnic State University; California State University, Northridge; California State University, Sacramento; the University of California, Davis; and Southern Utah University.

The conference comprised schools from the old Western Football Conference that had recently made the move from NCAA Division II to NCAA Division I. The conference was founded on July 15, 1993, as an NCAA Division I-AA football-only conference. It added additional sports a year later. The members were prompted to move their programs in response to an NCAA ruling barring member institutions from competing in football at a lower level than other sports.

The only commissioner of the American West Conference was Vic Buccola, who had been the athletic director at Cal Poly from 1973 to 1981, and commissioner of the Western Football Conference from 1981 to 1992.

== History ==
=== 1993–94: I-AA football only ===
UC Davis and Southern Utah tied for the 1993 AWC football championship with 3–1 records. Although UC Davis was a conference member, the team was listed in Division II polls, and participated in the Division II postseason.

=== 1994–95 ===
UC Davis left the AWC after the 1993 season, opting to stay in Division II, leaving Cal Poly San Luis Obispo, Cal State Northridge, Sacramento State, Southern Utah for the 1994–95 season. In the 1994–95 season, the AWC sponsored men's and women's cross country, men's and women's basketball, men's and women's track and field, and women's tennis, in addition to football. The AWC did not have an automatic bid to the NCAA championships since the NCAA requires a conference to have six teams.

Cal Poly San Luis Obispo won the 1994 AWC football championship.

=== 1995–96 ===
The 1995–96 season was the last season of the AWC. Cal Poly accepted an invitation to the Big West Conference. Cal State Northridge and Sacramento State accepted invitations to the Big Sky Conference. Southern Utah became an independent until they became members of the Mid-Continent Conference, now called the Summit League, in 1997.

By winning the 400 Meter Intermediate Hurdle championship races in both 1995 and 1996, David Baeza became the only Men's 400IH American West Conference Champion in history. He also won the 1996 400m Dash Championship race after finishing 3rd in the 1995 championship race.

=== Aftermath ===
Cal State Northridge left the Big Sky for the Big West in 2001. That year, they operated as a I-AA independent in football, and in 2002 their football program was dropped.

UC Davis made the decision to move up to Division I in 2003, and in 2007 they joined Cal State Northridge and Cal Poly in the Big West.

Former AWC members UC Davis, Cal Poly, and Southern Utah would later found the Great West Football Conference (later renamed the Great West Conference), along with newcomers Northern Colorado, North Dakota State, and South Dakota State from the North Central Conference, as a home for their football programs at the I-AA level in 2004. This conference remained small much like the AWC for its entire existence, ranging from only 5 to 6 football members at any given time. In late 2010, the Big Sky Conference announced it would add UC Davis and Cal Poly as football-only members, as well as Southern Utah as a full member, thus reuniting these schools with Sacramento State in football. This move effectively dissolved the Great West as a football-sponsoring conference.

=== Membership timeline ===
Full members Assoc. members (football only)

== Football standings ==
1993 American West Conference football standings
	Conf.					Overall
Team	W		L		T	W		L		T
No. 7 UC Davis +^	3	–	1	–	0	10	–	2	–	0
Southern Utah +	3	–	1	–	0	3	–	7	–	1
Sacramento State	2	–	2	–	0	4	–	6	–	0
Cal Poly	1	–	3	–	0	6	–	4	–	0
Cal State Northridge	1	–	3	–	0	4	–	6	–	0
+ – Conference co-champions; ^ – NCAA Division II playoff participant; Although UC Davis was a conference member, they participated in NCAA Division II polls and postseason.; Rankings from NCAA Division II Football Committee poll

1994 American West Conference football standings
	Conf.					Overall
Team	W		L		T	W		L		T
Cal Poly $	3	–	0	–	0	7	–	4	–	0
Sacramento State	2	–	1	–	0	5	–	5	–	0
Southern Utah	1	–	2	–	0	4	–	7	–	0
Cal State Northridge	0	–	3	–	0	3	–	7	–	0
$ – Conference champion

1995 American West Conference football standings
	Conf.					Overall
Team	W		L		T	W		L		T
Sacramento State $	3	–	0	–	0	4	–	6	–	1
Cal Poly	2	–	1	–	0	5	–	6	–	0
Cal State Northridge	1	–	2	–	0	2	–	8	–	0
Southern Utah	0	–	3	–	0	2	–	9	–	0
$ – Conference champion

== Men's basketball ==
=== Regular season standings ===
1994–95 American West Conference men's basketball standings
	Conf.				Overall
Team	W		L	PCT	W		L	PCT
Southern Utah†	6	–	0	1.000	17	–	11	.607
Cal State Northridge	4	–	2	.667	8	–	20	.286
Sacramento State	2	–	4	.333	6	–	21	.222
Cal Poly	0	–	6	.000	1	–	26	.037
† 1995 American West tournament winner Rankings from AP poll

1995–96 American West Conference men's basketball standings
	Conf.				Overall
Team	W		L	PCT	W		L	PCT
Cal Poly	5	–	1	.833	16	–	13	.552
Southern Utah†	3	–	3	.500	15	–	13	.536
Cal State Northridge	2	–	4	.333	7	–	20	.259
Sacramento State	2	–	4	.333	7	–	20	.259
† 1996 American West tournament winner Rankings from AP poll

=== Conference tournament champions ===
- 1995 — Southern Utah
- 1996 — Southern Utah

== Men's track & field champions ==
=== 400m ===
- 1996 David Baeza - Cal Poly

=== 400IH ===
- 1995 David Baeza - Cal Poly
- 1996 David Baeza - Cal Poly
