= 1993 Cal Poly Mustangs football team =

American college football season

1993 Cal Poly Mustangs football
- Conference: American West Conference
- Record: 6–4 (1–3 AWC)
- Head coach: Lyle Setencich (7th season)
- Home stadium: Mustang Stadium

1993 American West Conference football standings
	Conf.					Overall
Team	W		L		T	W		L		T
No. 7 UC Davis +^	3	–	1	–	0	10	–	2	–	0
Southern Utah +	3	–	1	–	0	3	–	7	–	1
Sacramento State	2	–	2	–	0	4	–	6	–	0
Cal Poly	1	–	3	–	0	6	–	4	–	0
Cal State Northridge	1	–	3	–	0	4	–	6	–	0
+ – Conference co-champions; ^ – NCAA Division II playoff participant; Although UC Davis was a conference member, they participated in NCAA Division II polls and postseason.; Rankings from NCAA Division II Football Committee poll

The 1993 Cal Poly Mustangs football team represented California Polytechnic State University, San Luis Obispo as a member of the American West Conference (AWC) during the 1993 NCAA Division II football season. Led by Lyle Setencich in his seventh and final season as head coach, Cal Poly compiled an overall record of 6–4 with a mark of 1–3 in conference play, tying for fourth place in the AWC. The team outscored its opponents 365 to 201 for the season. The Mustangs played home games at Mustang Stadium in San Luis Obispo, California.

Setencich finished his seven-year tenure at Cal Poly with a record of 41–29–2.

== Schedule ==
Date	Opponent	Rank	Site	Result	Attendance	Source
September 11	at UC Davis		Toomey Field; Davis, CA (rivalry)	L 26–37	4,375	
September 18	at Humboldt State*		Redwood Bowl; Arcata, CA	W 17–3	3,075–3,200	
September 25	Chico State*		Mustang Stadium; San Luis Obispo, CA	W 63–6	4,465	
October 2	at Sonoma State*		Cossacks Stadium; Rohnert Park, CA	W 53–13	440–450	
October 9	San Francisco State*		Mustang Stadium; San Luis Obispo, CA	W 46–21	5,490	
October 16	at Southern Utah	No. 20	Coliseum of Southern Utah; Cedar City, UT	W 38–6	5,582	
October 23	Sacramento State	No. 16	Mustang Stadium; San Luis Obispo, CA	L 33–35	6,527	
October 30	at No. 5 Portland State*	No. 18	Civic Stadium; Portland, OR	L 17–21	10,934	
November 6	Cal State Northridge		Mustang Stadium; San Luis Obispo, CA	L 14–22	5,654	
November 13	at Saint Mary's*		Saint Mary's Stadium; Moraga, CA	W 58–37	3,381	
*Non-conference game; Rankings from NCAA Division II Football Committee Poll released prior to the game
