= 1993 Nicholls State Colonels football team =

American college football season

1993 Nicholls State Colonels football
- Conference: Southland Conference
- Record: 3–8 (2–5 Southland)
- Head coach: Rick Rhoades (1st season)
- Home stadium: John L. Guidry Stadium

1993 Southland Conference football standings
	Conf.					Overall
Team	W		L		T	W		L		T
No. 5 McNeese State $^	7	–	0	–	0	10	–	3	–	0
No. 4 NE Louisiana ^	6	–	1	–	0	9	–	3	–	0
No. 14 Stephen F. Austin ^	5	–	2	–	0	8	–	4	–	0
Northwestern State	3	–	4	–	0	5	–	6	–	0
Sam Houston State	2	–	5	–	0	4	–	7	–	0
North Texas	2	–	5	–	0	4	–	7	–	0
Nicholls State	2	–	5	–	0	3	–	8	–	0
SW Texas State	1	–	6	–	0	2	–	9	–	0
$ – Conference champion; ^ – NCAA Division I-AA playoff participant; Rankings from The Sports Network poll

The 1993 Nicholls State Colonels football team represented Nicholls State University as a member of the Southland Conference during the 1993 NCAA Division I-AA football season. Led by first-year head coach Rick Rhoades, the Colonels compiled an overall record of 3–8 with mark of 2–5 in conference play, placing in a three-way tie for fifth in the Southland. Nicholls State played home games at John L. Guidry Stadium in Thibodaux, Louisiana.

== Schedule ==
Date	Opponent	Site	Result	Attendance	Source
September 11	at Livingston*	Tiger Stadium; Livingston, AL	L 42–51		
September 18	No. 8 Troy State*	John L. Guidry Stadium; Thibodaux, LA	L 17–24		
September 25	No. 6 Northeast Louisiana	John L. Guidry Stadium; Thibodaux, LA	L 30–51		
October 2	No. 10 Samford*	John L. Guidry Stadium; Thibodaux, LA	L 6–21	2,892	
October 9	at Northwestern State	Harry Turpin Stadium; Natchitoches, LA (rivalry)	L 21–35		
October 16	at No. 10 Stephen F. Austin	Homer Bryce Stadium; Nacogdoches, TX	L 21–35		
October 23	Southwest Texas State	John L. Guidry Stadium; Thibodaux, LA (rivalry)	W 63–37		
October 30	at No. 12 Southern*	A. W. Mumford Stadium; Baton Rouge, LA	W 28–14	25,592	
November 6	Sam Houston State	John L. Guidry Stadium; Thibodaux, LA	W 20–19		
November 13	at North Texas	Fouts Field; Denton, TX	L 21–63	5,043	
November 20	at No. 5 McNeese State	Cowboy Stadium; Lake Charles, LA	L 0–27		
*Non-conference game; Rankings from The Sports Network Poll released prior to the game
