= 1993 Northeast Louisiana Indians football team =

American college football season

1993 Northeast Louisiana Indians football

NCAA Division I-AA First Round, L 31–34 vs. Idaho
- Conference: Southland Conference

Ranking
- Sports Network: No. 4
- Record: 9–3 (6–1 SLC)
- Head coach: Dave Roberts (5th season)
- Offensive coordinator: Norman Joseph (4th season)
- Home stadium: Malone Stadium

1993 Southland Conference football standings
	Conf.					Overall
Team	W		L		T	W		L		T
No. 5 McNeese State $^	7	–	0	–	0	10	–	3	–	0
No. 4 NE Louisiana ^	6	–	1	–	0	9	–	3	–	0
No. 14 Stephen F. Austin ^	5	–	2	–	0	8	–	4	–	0
Northwestern State	3	–	4	–	0	5	–	6	–	0
Sam Houston State	2	–	5	–	0	4	–	7	–	0
North Texas	2	–	5	–	0	4	–	7	–	0
Nicholls State	2	–	5	–	0	3	–	8	–	0
SW Texas State	1	–	6	–	0	2	–	9	–	0
$ – Conference champion; ^ – NCAA Division I-AA playoff participant; Rankings from The Sports Network poll

The 1993 Northeast Louisiana Indians football team was an American football team that represented Northeast Louisiana University (now known as the University of Louisiana at Monroe) as part of the Southland Conference during the 1993 NCAA Division I-AA football season. In their fifth year under head coach Dave Roberts, the team compiled a 9–3 record. The Indians offense scored 462 points while the defense allowed 275 points.

== Schedule ==
Date	Time	Opponent	Rank	Site	Result	Attendance	Source
September 4	5:00 pm	at No. 13 Eastern Washington*	No. 6	Woodward Field; Cheney, WA	W 34–13	3,596	
September 11	7:00 pm	No. 18 Eastern Kentucky*	No. 6	Malone Stadium; Monroe, LA	W 40–14	20,500	
September 18	6:00 pm	at Southern Miss*	No. 5	M. M. Roberts Stadium; Hattiesburg, MS	L 37–44	20,384	
September 25	7:00 pm	at Nicholls State	No. 6	John L. Guidry Stadium; Thibodaux, LA	W 51–30		
October 2	7:00 pm	Northwestern State	No. 6	Malone Stadium; Monroe, LA (rivalry)	W 26–24		
October 9	7:00 pm	No. 18 McNeese State	No. 4	Malone Stadium; Monroe, LA	L 24–34	20,180	
October 16	7:00 pm	at Southwest Texas State	No. 12	Bobcat Stadium; San Marcos, TX	W 40–21	6,211	
October 23	7:00 pm	No. 10 Stephen F. Austin^{†}	No. 12	Malone Stadium; Monroe, LA	W 26–10		
November 6	6:00 pm	at Arkansas State*	No. 7	Indian Stadium; Jonesboro, AR	W 42–10		
November 13	3:00 pm	at Sam Houston State	No. 6	Bowers Stadium; Huntsville, TX	W 48–10		
November 20	7:00 pm	North Texas	No. 4	Malone Stadium; Monroe, LA	W 61–31		
November 27	6:00 pm	No. 11 Idaho*	No. 4	Malone Stadium; Monroe, LA (NCAA Division I-AA First Round)	L 31–34	10,000	
*Non-conference game; ^{†}Homecoming; Rankings from The Sports Network Poll released prior to the game; All times are in Central time
