= 1993 Southwest Texas State Bobcats football team =

American college football season

1993 Southwest Texas State Bobcats football
- Conference: Southland Conference
- Record: 2–9 (1–6 SLC)
- Head coach: Jim Bob Helduser (2nd season)
- Home stadium: Bobcat Stadium

1993 Southland Conference football standings
	Conf.					Overall
Team	W		L		T	W		L		T
No. 5 McNeese State $^	7	–	0	–	0	10	–	3	–	0
No. 4 NE Louisiana ^	6	–	1	–	0	9	–	3	–	0
No. 14 Stephen F. Austin ^	5	–	2	–	0	8	–	4	–	0
Northwestern State	3	–	4	–	0	5	–	6	–	0
Sam Houston State	2	–	5	–	0	4	–	7	–	0
North Texas	2	–	5	–	0	4	–	7	–	0
Nicholls State	2	–	5	–	0	3	–	8	–	0
SW Texas State	1	–	6	–	0	2	–	9	–	0
$ – Conference champion; ^ – NCAA Division I-AA playoff participant; Rankings from The Sports Network poll

The 1993 Southwest Texas State Bobcats football team was an American football team that represented Southwest Texas State University (now known as Texas State University) during the 1993 NCAA Division I-AA football season as a member of the Southland Conference (SLC). In their second year under head coach Jim Bob Helduser, the team compiled an overall record of 2–9 with a mark of 1–6 in conference play.

== Schedule ==
Date	Opponent	Site	Result	Attendance	Source
September 4	Texas A&M–Kingsville*	Bobcat Stadium; San Marcos, TX	W 20–14		
September 11	at No. 5 Idaho*	Kibbie Dome; Moscow, ID	L 38–66	9,100	
September 18	Liberty*	Bobcat Stadium; San Marcos, TX	L 14–17		
September 25	at No. 14 Northern Iowa*	UNI-Dome; Cedar Falls, IA	L 13–34	12,538	
October 9	at North Texas	Fouts Field; Denton, TX	L 28–35	10,447	
October 16	No. 12 Northeast Louisiana	Bobcat Stadium; San Marcos, TX	L 21–40	6,211	
October 23	at Nicholls State	John L. Guidry Stadium; Thibodaux, LA (rivalry)	L 37–63		
October 30	at Northwestern State	Harry Turpin Stadium; Natchitoches, LA	W 22–15		
November 6	No. 8 McNeese State	Bobcat Stadium; San Marcos, TX	L 10–27	7,641	
November 13	at No. 19 Stephen F. Austin	Homer Bryce Stadium; Nacogdoches, TX	L 10–27		
November 20	Sam Houston State	Bobcat Stadium; San Marcos, TX (rivalry)	L 10–35		
*Non-conference game; Rankings from The Sports Network Poll released prior to the game
