= 1993 Sam Houston State Bearkats football team =

American college football season

1993 Sam Houston State Bearkats football
- Conference: Southland Conference
- Record: 4–7 (2–5 Southland)
- Head coach: Ron Randleman (12th season)
- Defensive coordinator: Mike Lucas (4th season)
- Home stadium: Bowers Stadium

1993 Southland Conference football standings
| | Conf. | | | | | Overall |
| Team | W | | L | | T | W | | L | | T |
|---|---|---|---|---|---|---|---|---|---|---|
| No. 5 McNeese State $^ | 7 | – | 0 | – | 0 | 10 | – | 3 | – | 0 |
| No. 4 NE Louisiana ^ | 6 | – | 1 | – | 0 | 9 | – | 3 | – | 0 |
| No. 14 Stephen F. Austin ^ | 5 | – | 2 | – | 0 | 8 | – | 4 | – | 0 |
| Northwestern State | 3 | – | 4 | – | 0 | 5 | – | 6 | – | 0 |
| Sam Houston State | 2 | – | 5 | – | 0 | 4 | – | 7 | – | 0 |
| North Texas | 2 | – | 5 | – | 0 | 4 | – | 7 | – | 0 |
| Nicholls State | 2 | – | 5 | – | 0 | 3 | – | 8 | – | 0 |
| SW Texas State | 1 | – | 6 | – | 0 | 2 | – | 9 | – | 0 |
$ – Conference champion; ^ – NCAA Division I-AA playoff participant; Rankings from The Sports Network poll

The 1993 Sam Houston State Bearkats football team represented Sam Houston State University as a member of the Southland Conference during the 1993 NCAA Division I-AA football season. Led by 12th-year head coach Ron Randleman, the Bearkats compiled an overall record of 4–7 with a mark of 2–5 in conference play, and finished tied for fifth in the Southland.

== Schedule ==
| Date | Opponent | Site | Result | Attendance | Source |
|---|---|---|---|---|---|
| September 11 | at Southeast Missouri State* | Houck Stadium; Cape Girardeau, MO | W 40–7 | 6,821 | |
| September 18 | at Rice* | Rice Stadium; Houston, TX | L 13–14 | 18,600 | |
| September 25 | Texas A&M–Kingsville* | Bowers Stadium; Huntsville, TX | W 34–20 | 11,334 | |
| October 2 | at No. 17 Alcorn State* | Jack Spinks Stadium; Lorman, MS | L 24–31 | | |
| October 9 | at No. 13 Stephen F. Austin | Homer Bryce Stadium; Nacogdoches, TX (Battle of the Piney Woods) | L 20–24 | 10,020 | |
| October 16 | Northwestern State | Bowers Stadium; Huntsville, TX | L 27–34 | 3,227 | |
| October 23 | at No. 13 McNeese State | Cowboy Stadium; Lake Charles, LA | L 14–34 | 19,879 | |
| October 30 | North Texas | Bowers Stadium; Huntsville, TX | W 24–14 | | |
| November 6 | at Nicholls State | John L. Guidry Stadium; Thibodaux, LA | L 19–20 | | |
| November 13 | No. 6 Northeast Louisiana | Bowers Stadium; Huntsville, TX | L 10–48 | | |
| November 20 | at Southwest Texas State | Bobcat Stadium; San Marcos, TX (rivalry) | W 35–10 | | |
*Non-conference game; Rankings from NCAA Division I-AA Football Committee Poll released prior to the game
