= 1996 American West Conference men's basketball tournament =

- Classification: Division I
- Season: 1995–96
- Teams: 4
- Site: Matadome; Northridge, California

The 1996 American West Conference men's basketball tournament was held March 1–2, 1996, at the Matadome in Northridge, California. It was the last men's basketball tournament for the conference, which disbanded after the 1995–96 season.

Southern Utah won the tournament final, beating Cal Poly, 55–53. The tournament champion did not receive an automatic bid to the 1996 NCAA tournament.

1995–96 American West Conference men's basketball standings
	Conf.				Overall
Team	W		L	PCT	W		L	PCT
Cal Poly	5	–	1	.833	16	–	13	.552
Southern Utah†	3	–	3	.500	15	–	13	.536
Cal State Northridge	2	–	4	.333	7	–	20	.259
Sacramento State	2	–	4	.333	7	–	20	.259
† 1996 American West tournament winner Rankings from AP poll

== Bracket ==
Semifinals; March 1, 1996
1	Cal Poly	73
4	Sacramento State	66
2	Southern Utah	57
3	Cal State Northridge	54

Championship game March 2, 1996
1	Cal Poly	53
2	Southern Utah	55
