= Southern Utah Thunderbirds men's basketball =

Southern Utah Thunderbirds
| 2026–27 Southern Utah Thunderbirds men's basketball team |
- University: Southern Utah University
- Head coach: Rob Jeter (4th season)
- Location: Cedar City, Utah
- Arena: America First Event Center (capacity: 5,300)
- Conference: Big Sky
- Nickname: Thunderbirds
- Colors: Scarlet and white

NCAA Division I tournament appearances
- 2001

Conference tournament champions
- American West: 1995, 1996; Summit: 2001

Conference regular-season champions
- Summit: 2001; Big Sky: 2021

Uniforms
| Home | Away |

The Southern Utah Thunderbirds men's basketball team is the men's basketball team that represents Southern Utah University in Cedar City, Utah. The school's team currently competes in the Western Athletic Conference. The Thunderbirds are currently coached by Rob Jeter. The student section is known as the Thunderstorm.

== Postseason ==
=== NCAA Division I Tournament results ===
The Thunderbirds have appeared in the NCAA tournament once, as tournament champions of the Mid-Continent Conference in 2001. Seeded fourteenth in the East regional, Southern Utah was eliminated in the first round, falling by three points to the third seed, seventh-ranked Boston College.

| Year | Seed | Round | Opponent | Result |
|---|---|---|---|---|
| 2001 | 14 E | Round of 64 | (3) #7 Boston College | L 65–68 |

=== CBI results ===
Southern Utah has appeared in one CBI tournament. Their record is 2–1.

| Year | Round | Opponent | Result |
|---|---|---|---|
| 2023 | First Round; Quarterfinals; Semifinals | #13 North Alabama #12 Rice #8 Eastern Kentucky | W 72–50; W 81–79; L 106–108^{2OT} |

=== CIT results ===
Southern Utah has appeared in one CollegeInsider.com Postseason Tournament (CIT). Their record is 1–1.

| Year | Round | Opponent | Result |
|---|---|---|---|
| 2019 | First Round; Second Round | Drake; Cal State Bakersfield | W 80–73; L 67–70 |

=== The Basketball Classic results ===
Southern Utah has appeared in one The Basketball Classic Tournament. Their record is 3–1.

| Year | Round | Opponent | Result |
|---|---|---|---|
| 2022 | First Round; Second Round; Quarterfinals; Semifinals | Kent State; UTEP; Portland; Fresno State | W 83–79; W 82–69; W 77–66; L 48–67 |

=== NAIA Tournament results ===
The Thunderbirds appeared in the NAIA tournament once and lost their opening game.

| Year | Round | Opponent | Result |
|---|---|---|---|
| 1977 | First Round | Southwestern Oklahoma State | L 89–99 |

== Gallery ==
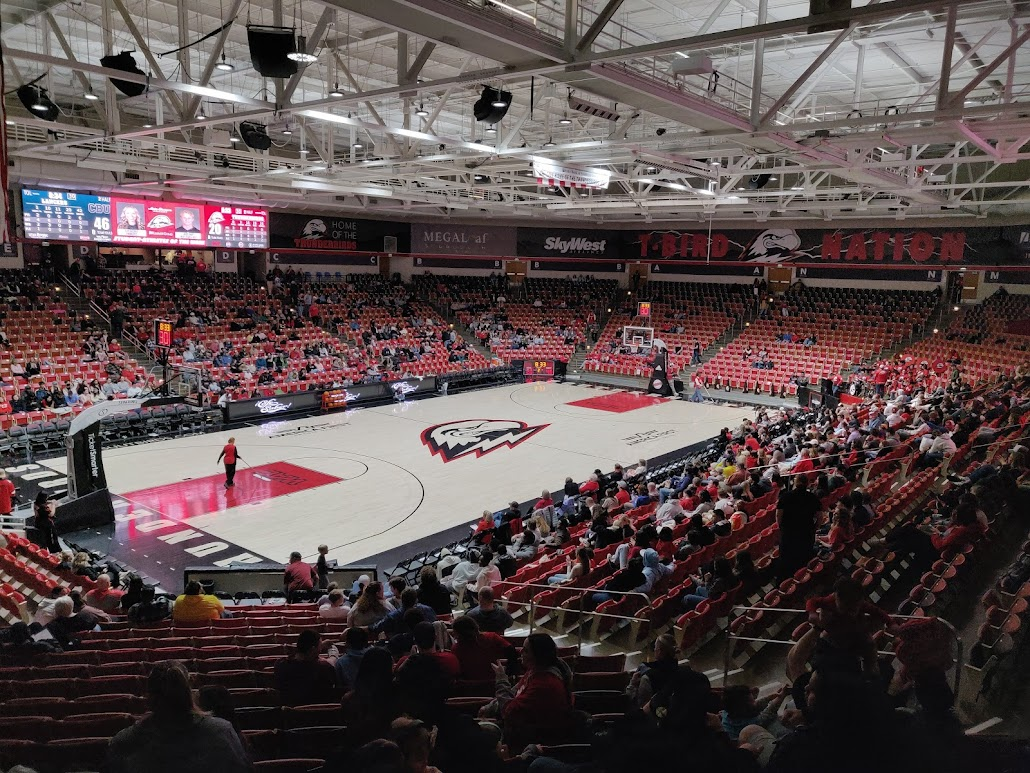
America First Event Center Inside1

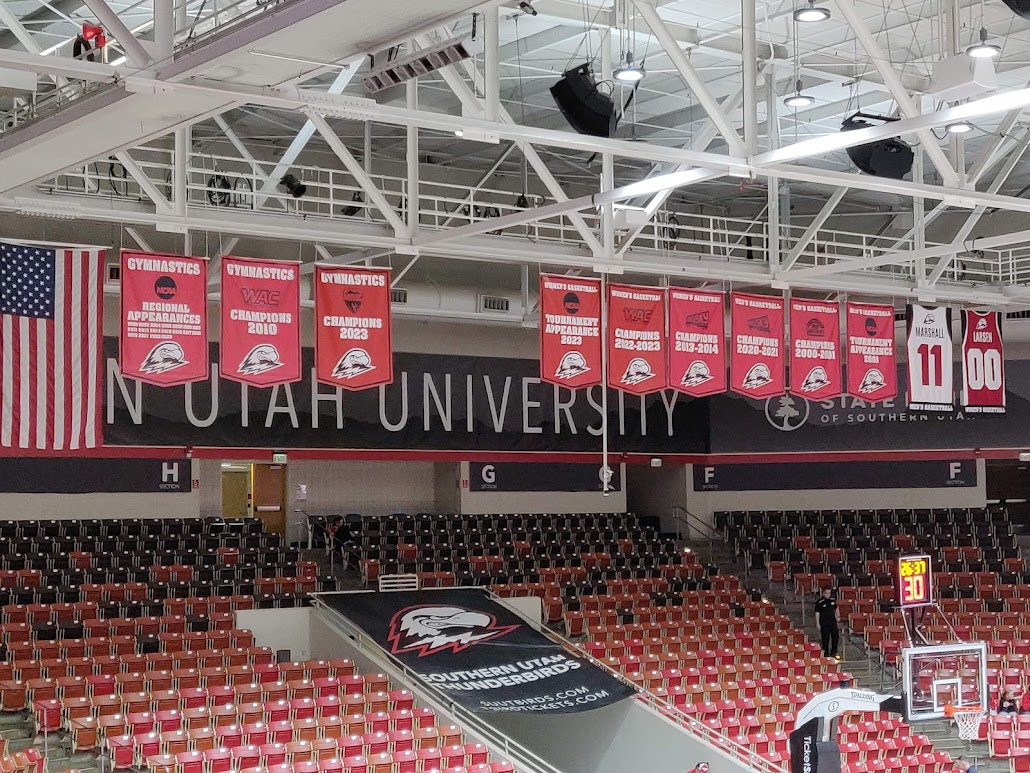
America First Event Center Inside2

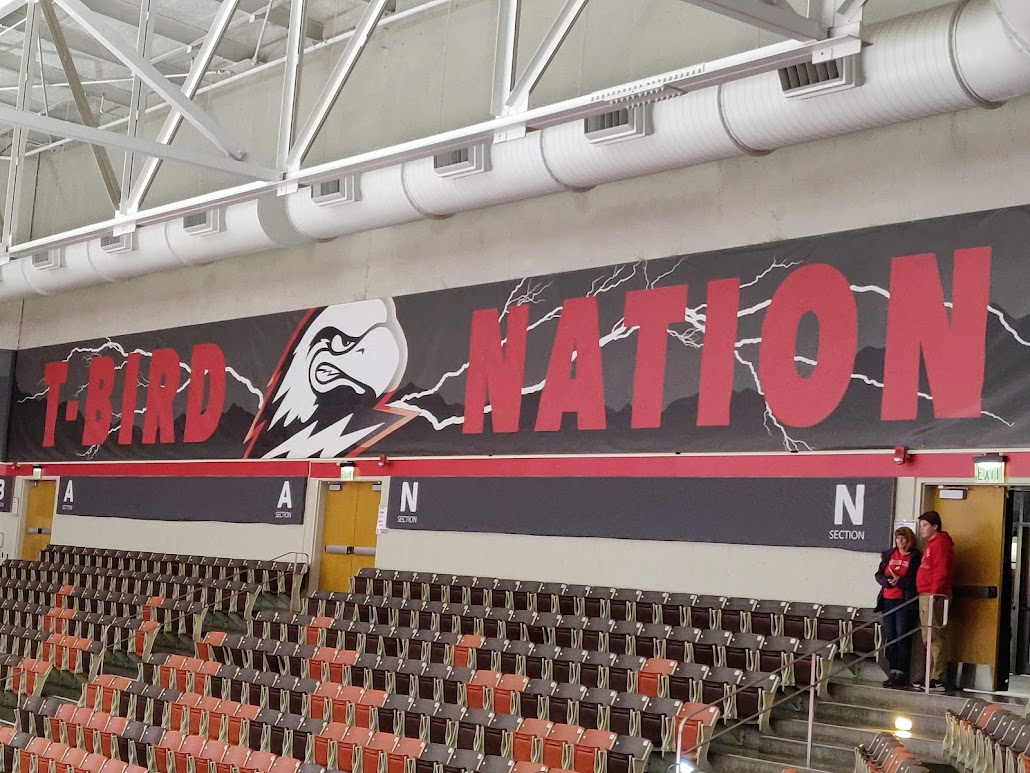
America First Event Center T-Bird Nation

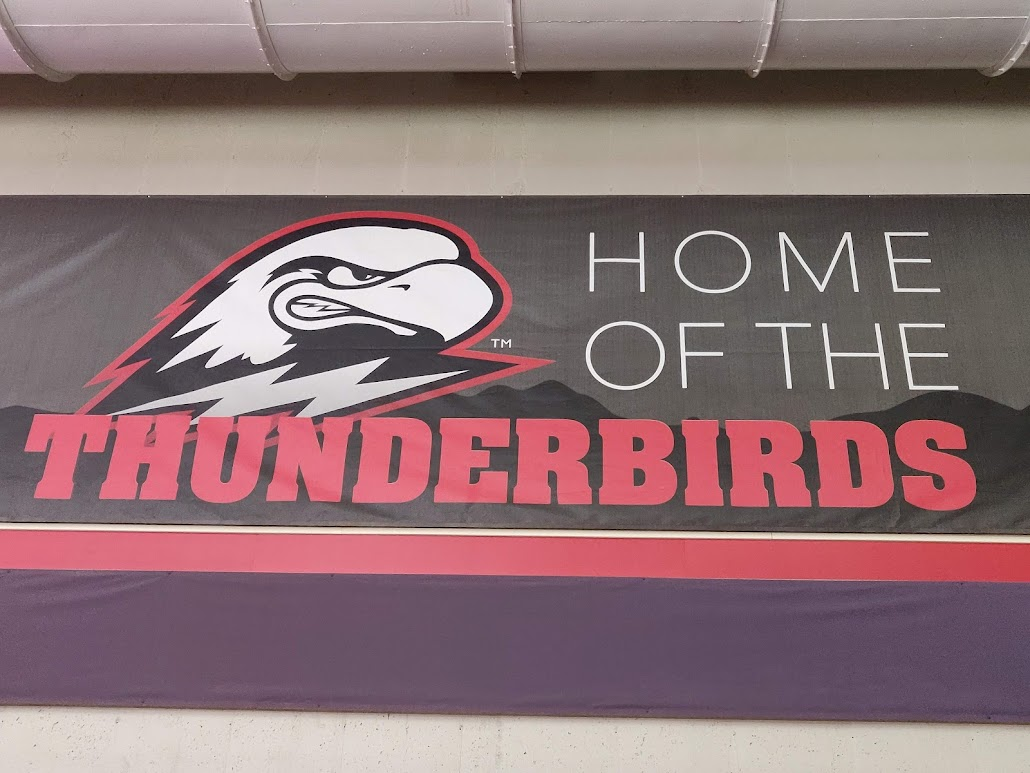
America First Event Center Thunderbirds
