= 1993 NCAA Division II football rankings =

The 1993 NCAA Division II football rankings are from the NCAA Division II football committee. This is for the 1993 season.

== Legend ==
	Increase in ranking
	Decrease in ranking
	Not ranked previous week
(#–#)	Win–loss record
(Italics)	Number of first place votes
т	Tied with team above or below also with this symbol

== NCAA Division II Football Committee poll ==
	Preseason	Week 1 Sept 14	Week 2 Sept 21	Week 3 Sept 28	Week 4 Oct 5	Week 5 Oct 12	Week 6 Oct 19	Week 7 Oct 26	Week 8 Nov 2	Week 9 Nov 9	
1.	North Dakota State (4)	North Dakota State (1–0) (4)	North Dakota State (2–0) (4)	North Dakota State (3–0) (4)	North Alabama (4–0) (3)	North Alabama (5–0) (3)	North Alabama (6–0) (3)	North Alabama (7–0) (3)	North Alabama (8–0) (3)	North Alabama (9–0) (4)	1.
2.	North Alabama	New Haven (2–0)	North Alabama (2–0)	North Alabama (3–0)	New Haven (5–0) (1)	New Haven (5–0) (1)	New Haven (6–0) (1)	New Haven (7–0) (1)	New Haven (8–0) (1)	New Haven (9–0)	2.
3.	Pittsburg State	North Alabama (1–0)	New Haven (3–0)	New Haven (4–0) т	Hampton (5–0)	Hampton (6–0)	Hampton (7–0)	Hampton (8–0)	Hampton (9–0)	Hampton (10–0)	3.
4.	New Haven т	Portland State (2–0)	Portland State (3–0)	Portland State (3–0) т	Mankato State (5–0)	North Dakota (5–0)	IUP (7–0)	IUP (8–0)	IUP (8–0)	IUP (9–0)	4.
5.	Portland State т	East Texas State (2–0) т	Hampton (3–0)	Hampton (4–0)	Portland State (3–1)	IUP (6–0)	Portland State (4–2)	Portland State (5–2)	Portland State (6–2)	Portland State (7–2)	5.
6.	East Texas State	Hampton (2–0) т	North Dakota (2–0)	North Dakota (3–0)	North Dakota (4–0)	Portland State (3–2)	Missouri Southern State (5–0–1)	Missouri Southern State (6–0–1)	Missouri Southern State (7–0–1)	Missouri Southern State (8–0–1)	6.
7.	Hampton	North Dakota (1–0)	IUP (3–0)	IUP (4–0)	IUP (5–0)	Valdosta State (5–1)	Angelo State (6–1)	Mankato State (7–1)	Mankato State (8–1)	UC Davis (8–1)	7.
8.	Texas A&I	IUP (2–0)	Mankato State (3–0)	Mankato State (4–0)	North Dakota State (3–1) т	Angelo State (5–1)	Mankato State (6–1)	UC Davis (6–1)	UC Davis (7–1)	Albany State (10–0)	8.
9.	Edinboro	Mankato State (2–0)	Valdosta State (2–1)	Valdosta State (3–1)	Valdosta State (4–1) т	Ferris State (5–0–1)	UC Davis (5–1)	Albany State (8–0)	Albany State (9–0)	North Dakota (8–1)	9.
10.	North Dakota	Valdosta State (1–1)	UC Davis (2–0)	Central Oklahoma (4–0)	Angelo State (4–1)	Missouri Southern State (4–0–1)	Albany State (7–0)	North Dakota (6–1)	North Dakota (7–1)	Ferris State (8–0–2)	10.
11.	West Chester	Ferris State (2–0)	Central Oklahoma (2–0)	Ferris State (3–0–1)	Ferris State (4–0–1)	Mankato State (5–1)	North Dakota (5–1)	Ferris State (6–0–2)	Ferris State (7–0–2)	Angelo State (7–2)	11.
12.	Valdosta State	UC Davis (1–0)	Ferris State (2–0–1)	Angelo State (3–1)	East Texas State (3–2)	UC Davis (4–1)	Ferris State (5–0–2)	Wayne State (7–0)	Wayne State (8–0)	Mankato State (8–2)	12.
13.	Northeast Missouri State	Pittsburg State (0–1)	Wayne State (3–0)	Wayne State (4–0)	Grand Valley State (4–1)	Albany State (6–0)	Northern Colorado (6–1)	Angelo State (6–2)	Angelo State (6–2)	Wayne State (9–0)	13.
14.	IUP (Note: In the actual printed polls, IUP was listed as Indiana (PA))	Gardner–Webb (1–0)	Angelo State (2–1) т	UC Davis (2–1)	Albany State (5–0)	Northern Colorado (5–1)	Elon (6–1) т	Edinboro (6–1)	Edinboro (7–1)	Carson–Newman (7–1–1)	14.
15.	Western State (CO)	East Stroudsburg (1–0)	Elon (3–0) т	Northern Colorado (4–0)	Missouri Southern State (3–0–1)	Wayne State (6–0)	Wayne State (6–0) т	Carson–Newman (5–1–1)	Carson–Newman (6–1–1)	Ashland (8–2)	15.
16.	Fort Valley State	Central Oklahoma (2–0)	Northern Colorado (3–0)	Grand Valley State (3–1)	Central Oklahoma (4–1)	Abilene Christian (5–1) т	Cal Poly (5–1)	Lenoir–Rhyne (6–1)	Ashland (7–2)	Millersville (8–1)	16.
17.	Mankato State	Fort Valley State (1–1)	Grand Valley State (2–1)	Albany State (4–0)	UC Davis (3–1)	Elon (5–1) т	Edinboro (5–1)	Ashland (6–2)	Northern Colorado (7–2)	Pittsburg State (7–2)	17.
18.	Grand Valley State	Angelo State (1–1)	Albany State (3–0) т	Northern Michigan (4–0)	Wayne State (5–0)	Edinboro (4–1)	Grand Valley State (4–1–2)	Cal Poly (5–2)	Abilene Christian (7–2) т	Virginia State (9–1)	18.
19.	Gardner–Webb	Wayne State (2–0)	East Texas State (2–1) т	Lenoir–Rhyne (3–0)	Northern Colorado (4–1)	Grand Valley State (4–1–1)	Carson–Newman (4–1–1)	Northern Colorado (6–2)	Pittsburg State (6–2) т	Texas A&M–Kingsville (4–5)	19.
20.	East Stroudsburg	Slippery Rock (2–0)	Shippensburg (3–0)	East Texas State (2–2)	Elon (4–1)	Cal Poly (4–1)	Abilene Christian (5–2) т	Abilene Christian (6–2) т	Valdosta State (7–2) т	Edinboro (7–2) т	20.
21.							Valdosta State (5–2) т	Valdosta State (6–2) т		North Dakota State (6–3) т	21.
	Preseason	Week 1 Sept 14	Week 2 Sept 21	Week 3 Sept 28	Week 4 Oct 5	Week 5 Oct 12	Week 6 Oct 19	Week 7 Oct 26	Week 8 Nov 2	Week 9 Nov 9	
		Dropped: 8 Texas A&I; 9 Edinboro; 11 West Chester; 13 Northeast Missouri State; 15 Western State (CO); 18 Grand Valley State	Dropped: 13 Pittsburg State; 14 Gardner–Webb; 15 East Stroudsburg; 17 Fort Valley State; 20 Slippery Rock	Dropped: 15 Elon; 20 Shippensburg	Dropped: 18 Northern Michigan; 19 Lenoir–Rhyne	Dropped: 8 North Dakota State; 12 East Texas State; 16 Central Oklahoma	None	Dropped: 14 Elon; 18 Grand Valley State	Dropped: 16 Lenoir–Rhyne; 18 Cal Poly	Dropped: 17 Northern Colorado; 18 Abilene Christian; 20 Valdosta State	
