= Cal Poly Mustangs men's basketball statistical leaders =

The Cal Poly Mustangs basketball statistical leaders are individual statistical leaders of the Cal Poly Mustangs men's basketball program in various categories, including points, rebounds, assists, steals, and blocks. Within those areas, the lists identify single-game, single-season, and career leaders. The Mustangs represent California Polytechnic State University in the NCAA Division I Big West Conference.

Cal Poly began competing in intercollegiate basketball in 1907 and its first season as a four-year institution was 1941–42. However, the school's record book does not generally list records from before the 1950s, as records from before this period are often incomplete and inconsistent. Since scoring was much lower in this era, and teams played much fewer games during a typical season, it is likely that few or no players from this era would appear on these lists anyway.

The NCAA did not officially record assists as a stat until the 1983–84 season, and blocks and steals until the 1985–86 season, but Cal Poly's record books includes players in these stats before these seasons. These lists are updated through the end of the 2023–24 season.

== Scoring ==
Career
Rk	Player	Points	Seasons
1	Chris Bjorklund	2,006	1997–98 1998–99 1999–00 2000–01
2	Mike Wozniak	1,903	1996–97 1997–98 1998–99 1999–00
3	Varnie Dennis	1,594	2000–01 2001–02 2002–03 2003–04
4	Mike LaRoche	1,500	1965–66 1966–67 1967–68
5	Gerald Jones	1,377	1973–74 1974–75 1975–76 1976–77
6	Billy Jackson	1,370	1970–71 1971–72 1972–73
7	Shawn Lewis	1,304	2007–08 2008–09 2009–10 2010–11
8	David Hanson	1,267	2008–09 2009–10 2010–11 2011–12
9	Donovan Fields	1,245	2016–17 2017–18 2018–19
10	Hank Moroski	1,224	1947–48 1948–49 1949–50

Season
Rk	Player	Points	Season
1	Stuart Thomas	658	1990–91
2	Hamad Mousa	652	2025–26
3	Owen Koonce	593	2024–25
4	Kevin Lucas	579	1981–82
5	Kobe Sanders	568	2023–24
6	Lew Jackson	565	1971–72
7	Mike LaRoche	550	1966–67
8	Mike Wozniak	548	1997–98
9	Sean Chambers	531	1986–87
10	Chris Bjorklund	525	1999–00

Single game
Rk	Player	Points	Season	Opponent
1	Shanta Cotright	43	1995–96	George Mason
	Larry Madsen	43	1953–54	Pomona-Pitzer

== Rebounds ==
Career
Rk	Player	Rebounds	Seasons
1	Robert Jennings	737	1970–71 1971–72 1972–73
2	Damien Levesque	701	1993–94 1994–95 1995–96 1996–97
3	Les Rogers	692	1966–67 1967–68 1968–69
4	Varnie Dennis	675	2000–01 2001–02 2002–03 2003–04
5	Jeremiah Mayes	674	1997–98 1998–99 1999–00 2000–01
6	Billy Jackson	663	1970–71 1971–72 1972–73
7	David Hanson	628	2008–09 2009–10 2010–11 2011–12
8	Chris Bjorklund	612	1997–98 1998–99 1999–00 2000–01
9	Chris Eversley	611	2011–12 2012–13 2013–14
10	Brian Bennett	557	2012–13 2013–14 2014–15 2015–16

Season
Rk	Player	Rebounds	Season
1	Theo Dunn	293	1956–57
2	Les Rogers	292	1967–68
3	Andre Keys	291	1976–77
4	Billy Jackson	275	1970–71
5	Robert Jennings	270	1970–71
6	Will Donahue	268	2010–11
7	Robert Jennings	257	1971–72
8	Stuart Thomas	250	1990–91
9	John Hindenach	243	1966–67
10	Chris Eversley	241	2013–14

Single game
Rk	Player	Rebounds	Season	Opponent
1	Les Rogers	25	1967–68	Fresno State
2	Josh Martin	21	2016–17	Pepperdine

== Assists ==
Career
Rk	Player	Assists	Seasons
1	Jim Schultz	552	1979–80 1980–81
2	Keith Wheeler	496	1980–81 1981–82 1982–83 1983–84
3	Ben Larson	483	1995–96 1996–97 1997–98 1998–99
4	Horace Williams	407	1971–72 1972–73 1973–74
5	Lewis Cohen	393	1976–77 1977–78
6	Donovan Fields	303	2016–17 2017–18 2018–19
7	Jamal Johnson	300	2010–11 2011–12 2012–13 2013–14
8	Ridge Shipley	287	2013–14 2014–15 2015–16 2016–17
9	Shanta Cotright	286	1993–94 1994–95 1995–96 1996–97
10	Jeff Oliver	262	1990–91 1991–92 1992–93

Season
Rk	Player	Assists	Season
1	Jim Schultz	295	1980–81
2	Jim Schultz	257	1979–80
3	Lewis Cohen	243	1976–77
4	Keith Wheeler	205	1983–84
5	Horace Williams	163	1972–73
6	Ben Larson	151	1995–96
7	Lewis Cohen	150	1977–78
8	Keith Wheeler	139	1982–83
9	Horace Williams	138	1971–72
	James Wells	138	1985–86

Single game
Rk	Player	Assists	Season	Opponent
1	Lewis Cohen	16	1976–77	San Francisco State
	Keith Wheeler	16	1983–84	Sacramento State

== Steals ==
Career
Rk	Player	Steals	Seasons
1	Ben Larson	274	1995–96 1996–97 1997–98 1998–99
2	Keith Wheeler	189	1980–81 1981–82 1982–83 1983–84
3	Shanta Cotright	132	1993–94 1994–95 1995–96 1996–97
4	Matt Clawson	128	1990–91 1991–92 1992–93 1993–94
5	Damien Levesque	127	1993–94 1994–95 1995–96 1996–97
6	Mike Wozniak	126	1996–97 1997–98 1998–99 1999–00
7	Donovan Fields	112	2016–17 2017–18 2018–19
	Shawn Lewis	112	2007–08 2008–09 2009–10 2010–11
9	Sean Chambers	98	1985–86 1986–87
10	David Nwaba	97	2013–14 2014–15 2015–16

Season
Rk	Player	Steals	Season
1	Ben Larson	100	1995–96
2	Keith Wheeler	71	1983–84
3	Ben Larson	69	1996–97
4	Shanta Cotright	55	1995–96
	Ben Larson	55	1997–98
6	Keith Wheeler	54	1981–82
	Keith Wheeler	54	1982–83
	Mac Riniker	54	2024–25
9	James Wells	53	1985–86
10	Sean Chambers	52	1985–86

Single game
Rk	Player	Steals	Season	Opponent
1	Trae Clark	8	2007–08	Menlo College
	Ben Larson	8	1995–96	UC Santa Cruz

== Blocks ==
Career
Rk	Player	Blocks	Seasons
1	Varnie Dennis	136	2000–01 2001–02 2002–03 2003–04
2	Titus Shelton	130	2005–06 2006–07 2007–08 2008–09
3	Hank Hollingsworth	120	2016–17 2017–18 2018–19 2019–20 2020–21
4	Joel Awich	115	2012–13 2013–14 2014–15 2015–16
5	Alimamy Koroma	90	2019–20 2020–21 2021–22 2022–23
6	Chris Bjorklund	76	1997–98 1998–99 1999–00 2000–01
7	Tuukka Jaakkola	69	2018–19 2019–20 2020–21 2021–22 2023–24
8	Jeremiah Mayes	68	1997–98 1998–99 1999–00 2000–01
9	Zach Gordon	67	2012–13 2013–14 2015–16 2016–17
10	Dreshawn Vance	60	2006–07 2007–08

Season
Rk	Player	Blocks	Season
1	Varnie Dennis	58	2002–03
2	Hank Hollingsworth	52	2017–18
3	Titus Shelton	48	2008–09
4	Varnie Dennis	42	2001–02
5	Zach Gordon	41	2016–17
6	Joel Armotrading	39	2023–24
	Shawn Kirkeby	39	1991–92
8	Joel Awich	38	2014–15
	Titus Shelton	38	2006–07
10	Dreshawn Vance	34	2007–08

Single game
Rk	Player	Blocks	Season	Opponent
1	Hank Hollingsworth	7	2017–18	Cal State Fullerton
2	Alimamy Koroma	6	2020–21	UC Davis
	Titus Shelton	6	2006–07	Cal State Fullerton
	Phil Johnson	6	2004–05	Cal State Fullerton
