= Maude Frazier =

American politician (1881–1963)

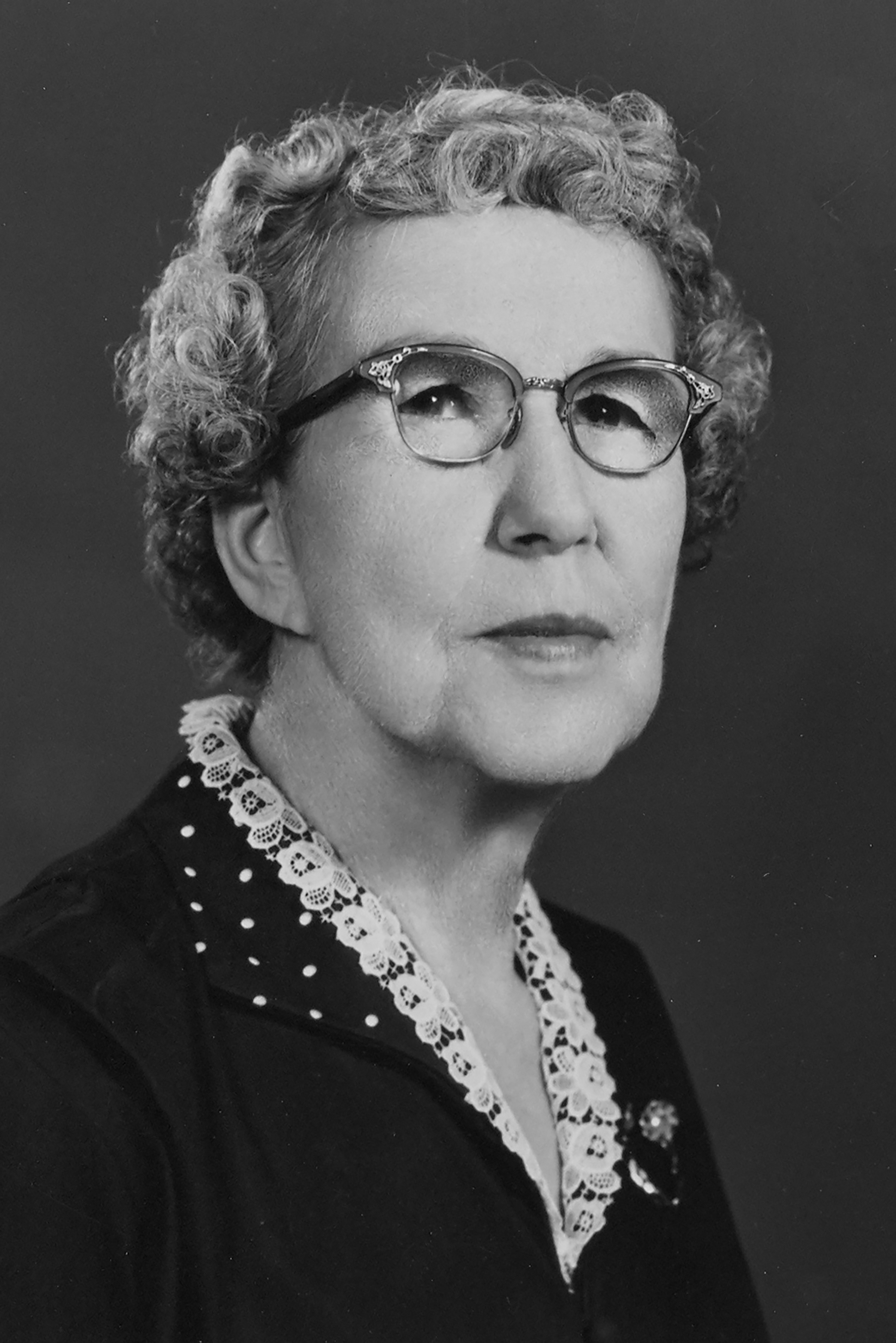

22nd Lieutenant Governor of Nevada
- In office July 13, 1962 – January 7, 1963
- Governor: Grant Sawyer
- Preceded by: Rex Bell
- Succeeded by: Paul Laxalt

Member of the Nevada State Assembly
- In office 1950–1962

Nevada Deputy Superintendent of Public Instruction
- In office 1921–1927

Superintendent of Las Vegas Union School District
- In office 1927–1947

Personal details
- Born: April 4, 1881 Sauk County, Wisconsin, U.S.
- Died: June 20, 1963 (aged 82) Las Vegas, Nevada, U.S.
- Party: Democratic

Maude Frazier (April 4, 1881 – June 20, 1963) was an American educator and politician who served as the 22nd lieutenant governor of Nevada. A member of the Democratic Party, Frazier was a member of the Nevada Assembly, elected to represent Clark County from 1950 to 1962.

Before running for office, Frazier was a Nevada deputy superintendent of public instruction over Southern Nevada from 1921 to 1927. For the following twenty years, from 1927 to 1947, she served as principal of Las Vegas High School and superintendent of the Las Vegas Union School District, which in 1956 became the Clark County School District.

As an assemblywoman, Frazier was a vocal proponent of establishing a public university in Southern Nevada. As chair of the education committee and a member of the ways and means committee, she secured the legislature’s support to establish the University of Nevada, Las Vegas.

== Early life and education ==
Frazier was born on April 4, 1881, near Baraboo, Wisconsin, to William Henry Frazier and Mary Emma (née Presnall) Frazier, both of Scottish heritage.

Raised on a farm in Sauk County, she graduated from Baraboo HIgh School and Wisconsin State Normal School. While teaching in Wisconsin, she sent out letters of application to schools in the Western United States, and received an offer for a teaching principalship in Genoa, Nevada, which she accepted.

== Career in education ==
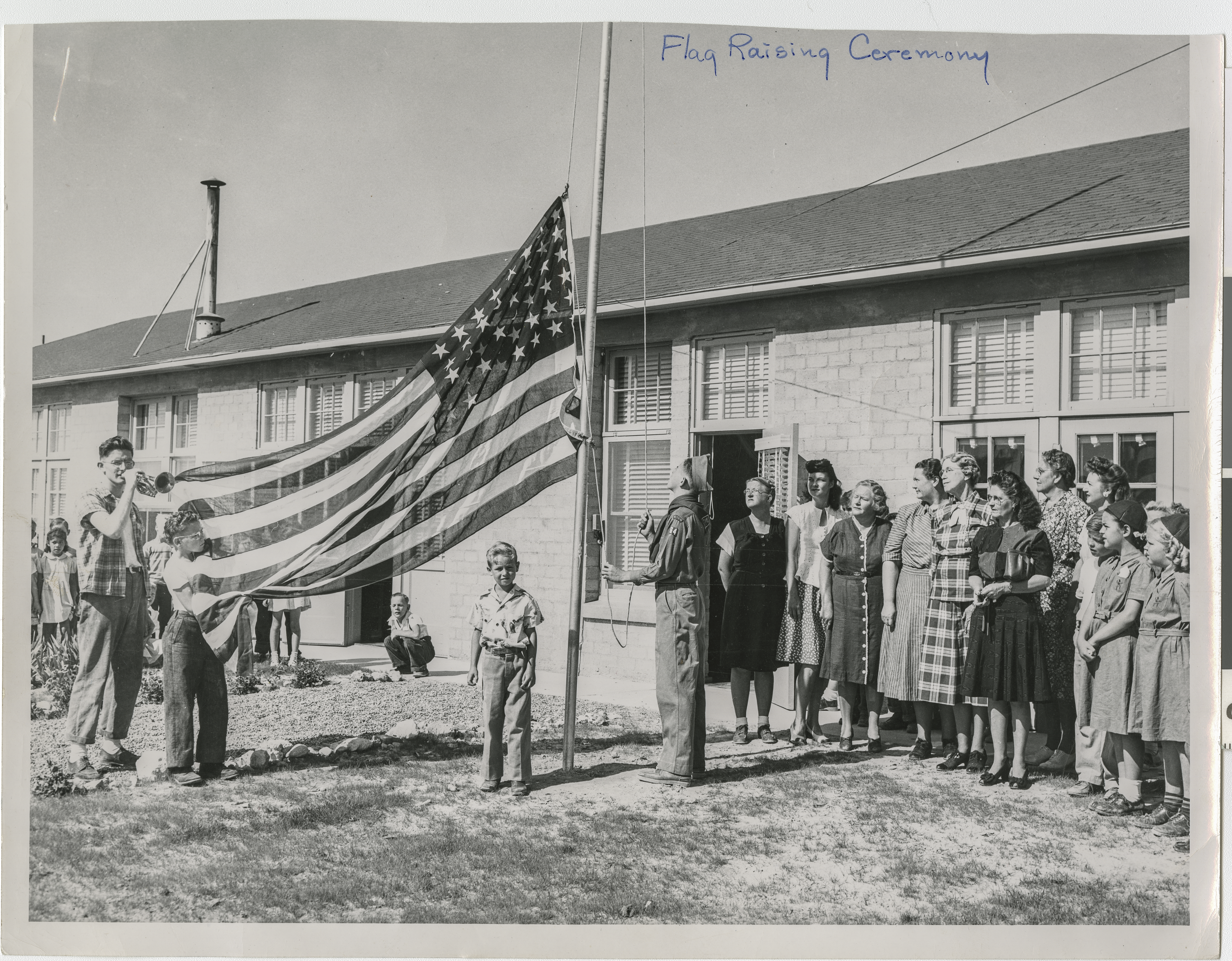
Maude Frazier (fifth from right) in 1946 as superintendent during a flag-raising memorial ceremony for a student's father killed during World War II.

In 1906, Frazier took a Southern Pacific train from Wisconsin to Genoa, an unincorporated town in Douglas County, located about 42 miles (68 km) south of Reno. which offered her the position of principal and upper-grades teacher in a two-teacher schoolhouse.

Until 1912, Frazier was a teacher and principal in the northern Nevada communities of Lovelock and Seven Troughs before heading south to Beatty. Between 1912 and 1917, she taught in Goldfield before becoming principal of Sparks Elementary School in 1917, supervising a staff of 19 teachers.

In 1921, Frazier was hired by the Nevada Board of Education to be one of state's four deputy superintendents of public instruction over Southern Nevada. As deputy superintendent, she supervised 75 schools in 63 school districts with 2,824 students over 40,000 sq mi (100,000 km^{2}), covering all of Clark, Lincoln, Esmeralda, and Nye counties.

Cornerstone laying ceremony on February 22, 1930 for a new building for Las Vegas High School as a result of Frazier securing the bond funding necessary for its construction.

Since road infrastructure was underdeveloped in the desert southwest in the 1920s, Frazier drove a Dodge roadster along the abandoned railroad track bed of the Las Vegas and Tonopah Railroad, which was repurposed as the segment of the U.S. Route 95 between Tonopah and Las Vegas. An historical profile of Frazier in the Las Vegas Review-Journal stated that contemporary sources claim she was the first person to drive the 180 miles between Las Vegas and Goldfield in one day.

In 1934, the Las Vegas Grammar School was destroyed by a fire. As the school district superintendent and principal, Frazier secured $187,000 (equivalent to $4,338,669 in 2025) from the federal Works Progress Administration, an agency created by the New Deal in the aftermath of the Great Depression, to rebuild the school. On October 24, 1936, the rebuilt school, featuring Art Deco architecture, was formally dedicated during a ceremony attended by prominent political figures including Secretary of the Interior Harold Ickes, United States Senators Vail Pittman and Pat McCarran, United States Representative James G. Scrugham, and Governor Richard Kirman. The ceremony featured a convocation by a local minister and performances by the Las Vegas High School band and elementary school students who sang he "The Star Spangled Banner." Senator Pittman, himself a Democrat, held a political campaign rally at the school two days after the dedication ceremony to rally support in the 1936 presidential election Franklin Delano Rosevelt and other Democrats at the state and federal level. During his speech, he cited the schools construction and its funding from the WPA as an argument for voters to re-elect.

During World War II, goods rationing was instituted and schools were commonly chosen to function as registration sites and distribution centers for rationing materials. In April 1942, Las Vegas High School was chosen as a site and Frazier was chosen to lead efforts to educate business and residents about the mandatory program.

She retired from the district in 1946 but remained active in civic affairs and education policy. She was a member of the Las Vegas local union of the Federation of Business and Professional Women.

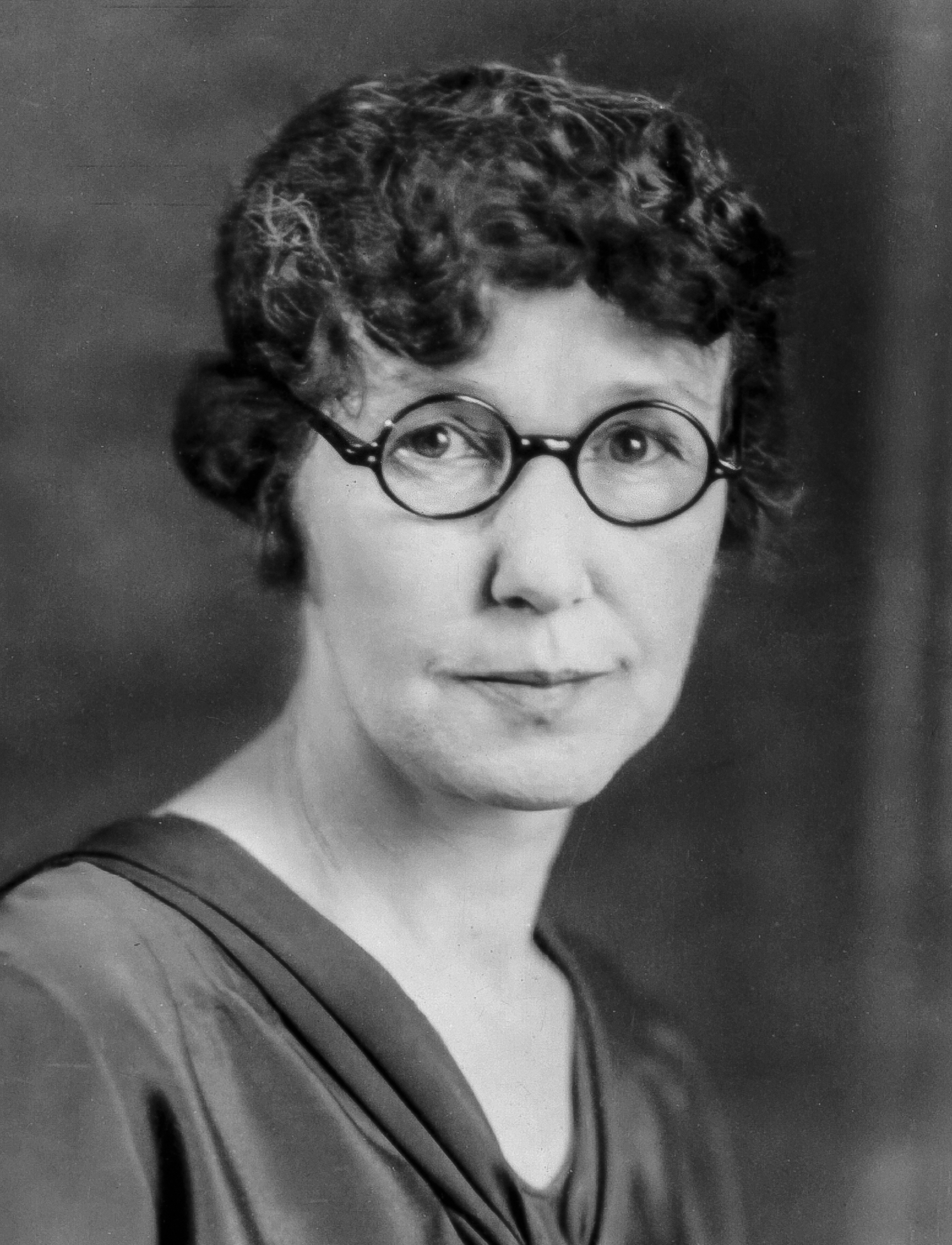
Frazier in 1930 when she served as superintendent of the Las Vegas Union School District and principal of Las Vegas High School.

== Nevada Assembly (1950–1962) ==
Frazier first ran for the Nevada Assembly in 1948 and was elected in 1950, serving on the education committee, the ways and means committee, and the state library committee.

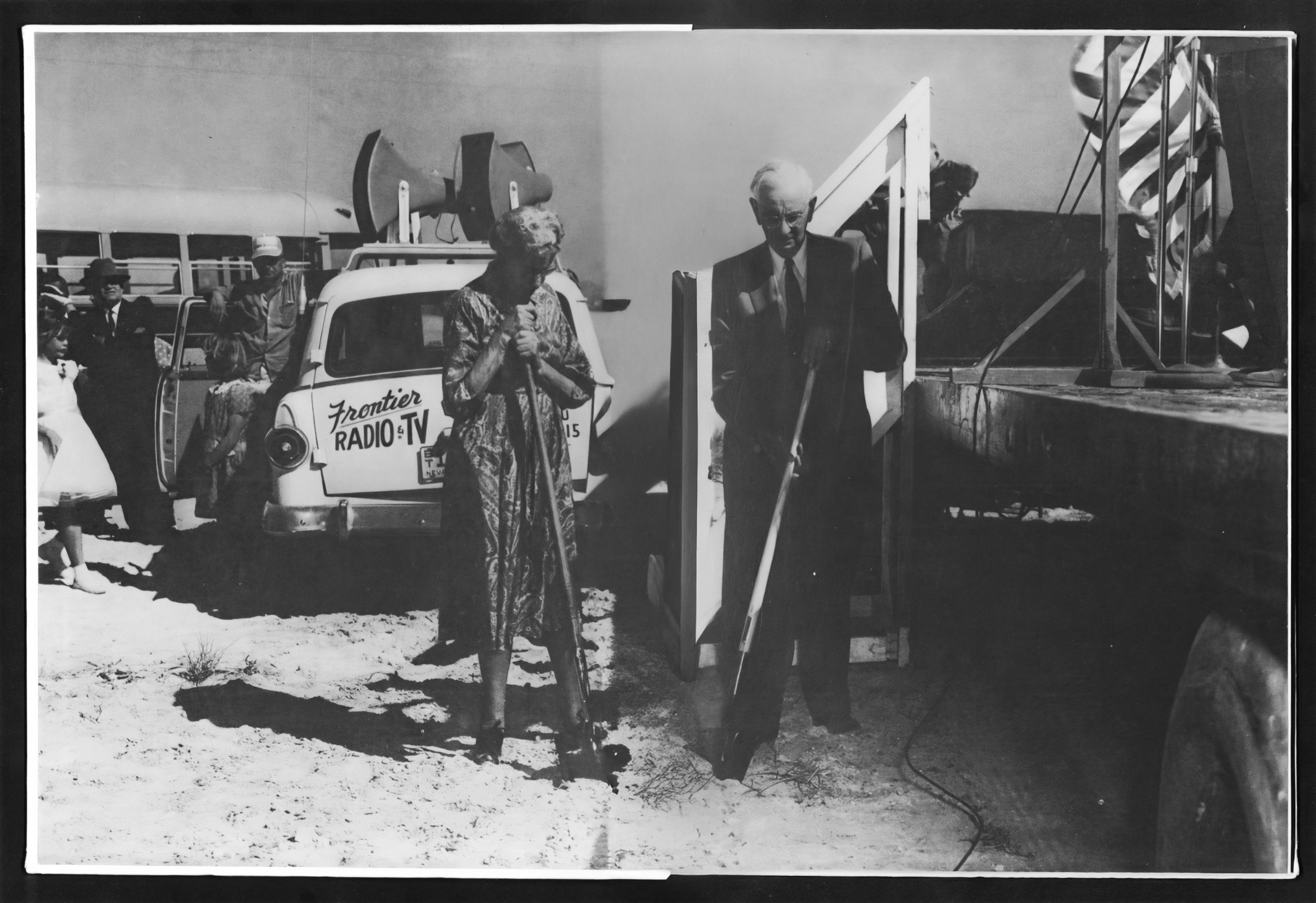
Maude Frazier and University of Nevada Board of Trustees Chairman Silas Ross at a groundbreaking ceremony for Nevada Southern University, later renamed the University of Nevada, Las Vegas, in May 1956.

Although known for securing increases in education funding, she also sponsored two successful constitutional amendments reforming the Nevada Legislature: one that limits the number of days for which state lawmakers can receive compensation during a single session, and the other repealing the constitutionally fixed duration of legislative sessions. The intent of the first amendment was to encourage efficient use of time by lawmakers, and the second enabled future adjustments through ordinary legislative processes rather than constitutional amendment.

She was a member of the Assembly ways and means committee for four consecutive sessions beginning in 1955 and became the first woman in Nevada history to serve on a state budget committee. For all six terms, she was chair of the education committee and served variously on the elections, social welfare, and state libraries committees.

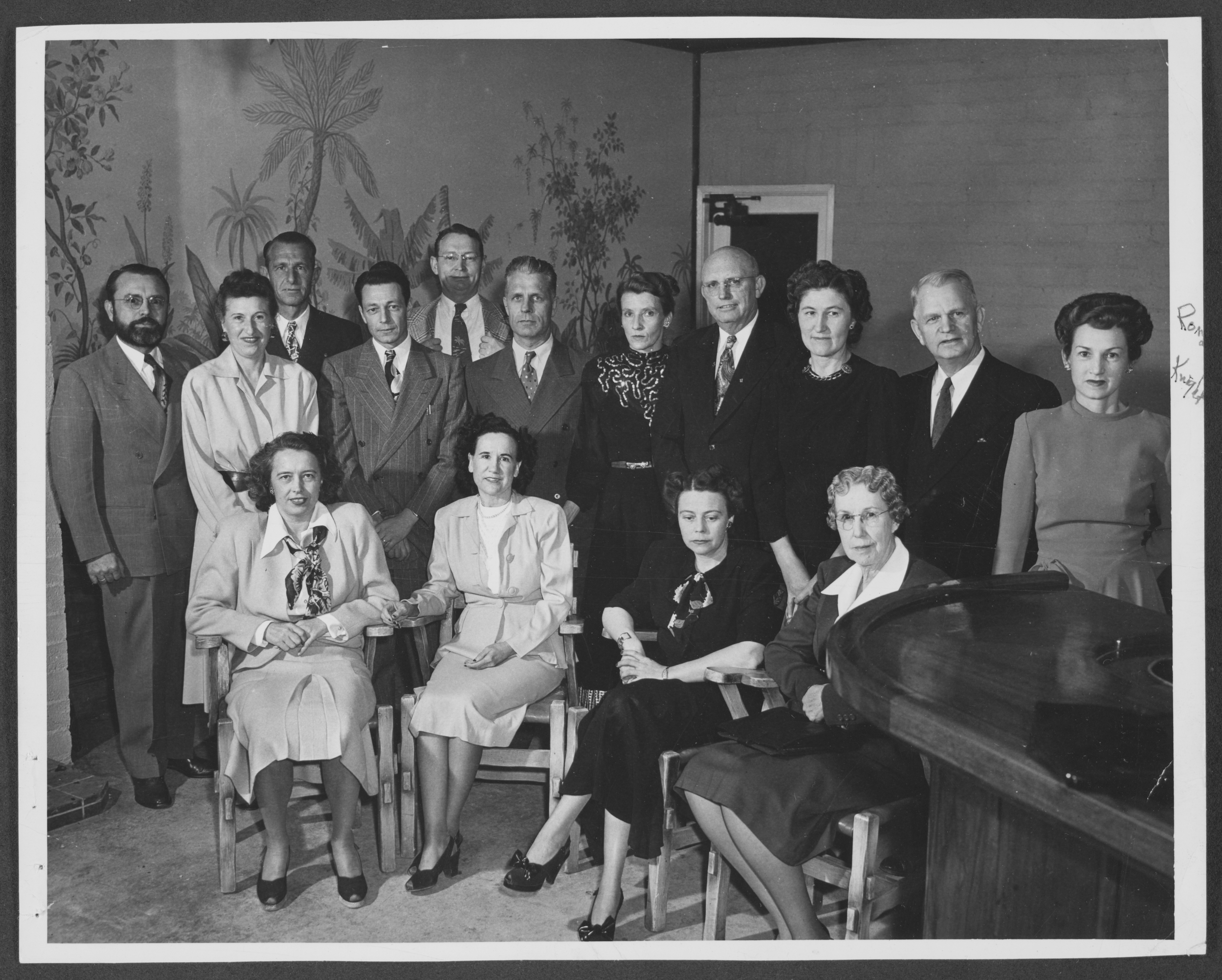
Education leaders gathered for a social event given by the Las Vegas Education Association in Las Vegas, Nevada. Frazier is the last seated on the right.

She co-authored the 1955 bill establishing a southern campus of the University of Nevada. First named Nevada Southern University, it would become an independent institution and be renamed the University of Nevada, Las Vegas.

With an increasing population, many Southern Nevadans began advocating for a local college or university, especially the roughly 2,500 federal employees who worked for the Bureau of Reclamation and the Bureau of Land Management, in addition to airmen stationed at Nellis Air Force Base.

Although most of the demand came from Boulder City and Henderson, Frazier believed that a more central location in the Las Vegas Valley would reach more students effectively in the long run. Private, out-of-state institutions such as Brigham Young University in Utah had planned to begin establishing satellite campuses in the region. While most legislators from Northern Nevada argued that college-bound students could go to Reno or out of state, Frazier and others advocated for local accessibility and for keeping tuition dollars in the local economy instead of sending them elsewhere.

She helped secure a $200,000 state appropriation, contingent on $100,000 in local fundraising, and led grassroots efforts in which high school seniors canvassed Las Vegas neighborhoods for donations. In 1956, Frazier turned the first shovel of dirt for what became UNLV’s first building, Maude Frazier Hall. In 1955, the University of Nevada, Reno awarded Frazier an honorary Doctor of Letters.

== Lieutenant governor of Nevada ==
On July 13, 1962, at age 81, Governor Grant Sawyer appointed Frazier to be lieutenant governor following the death of Rex Bell, a Republican. Frazier resigned her seat as assemblywoman to become the first woman to hold a state-wide, constitutional office in Nevada.

Frazier was chosen for the role due to the particular problems arising from Bell's death. As relatively young head of the Nevada Republican Party, his unexpected death left a power vacuum and prompted a highly-contentious contest close to the primary election.

State law requires that when a vacancy is filled by appointment, the appointee must be from the same political party as the person originally elected. In this case, Sawyer was a Democrat, but Nevada elects each office independently, so the seat in question had been held by a Republican. He should have appointed a Republican rather than Frazier, a fellow Democrat. However, the state Republican Party did not want Sawyer to sway who would be chosen as head of their party, and let him appoint Frazier. Her choice was also well received due to her history in state education leadership and her decade in the Assembly prior to appointment.

She served until January 1963, the remaining six months in Bell’s term. Although, the role of lieutenant governor has few powers and is considered effectively "part time," Frazier served as acting governor on September 6 and 7 when the governor was in California.

She decided not to run for lieutenant governor nor return to the state assembly, choosing instead to retire from public office.

== Legacy and death ==
She died in her sleep on June 20, 1963, at the age of 82, just six months after she left office.

In the Las Vegas Sun, Governor Grant Sawyer reacted to her death, saying, “She was such a champion of public education and a distinguished member of the state legislature for many years. My family and I have lost a good friend, and the people of Nevada have lost one of their strongest supporters.”

Maude Frazier Hall on the campus of the University of Nevada, Las Vegas was named after her to commemorate her role as chairwoman of the Nevada Assembly committee responsible for the legislation creating the university. The building was constructed and named after her in 1957 and served as the university’s administrative offices. In 2009, the building was demolished when repair costs exceeded the cost of replacement. A portion of the building’s wall was retained as a memorial, in which a bronze bust of Frazier was installed along with a plaque.

In 2024, the Red Cross of Southern Nevada inaugurated an annual award named after Frazier for its volunteers who “exemplify the spirit of volunteerism and community service,” named the Maude Frazier Founder’s Award.

She did not marry nor have children, though she did have an active social life and relationships.

== See also ==
- Helen Herr
- Las Vegas Grammar School
- Las Vegas High School Historic District
- List of female lieutenant governors in the United States

Political offices
Preceded by Rex Bell	Lieutenant Governor of Nevada; 1962–1963	Succeeded by Paul Laxalt
