= Sendlein =

Sendlein is a surname. Notable people with the surname include:

- Lyle Sendlein (born 1984), American football player
- Robin Sendlein (born 1958), American football player and fire fighter
