= American West Conference Men's Basketball Player of the Year =

Annual basketball award

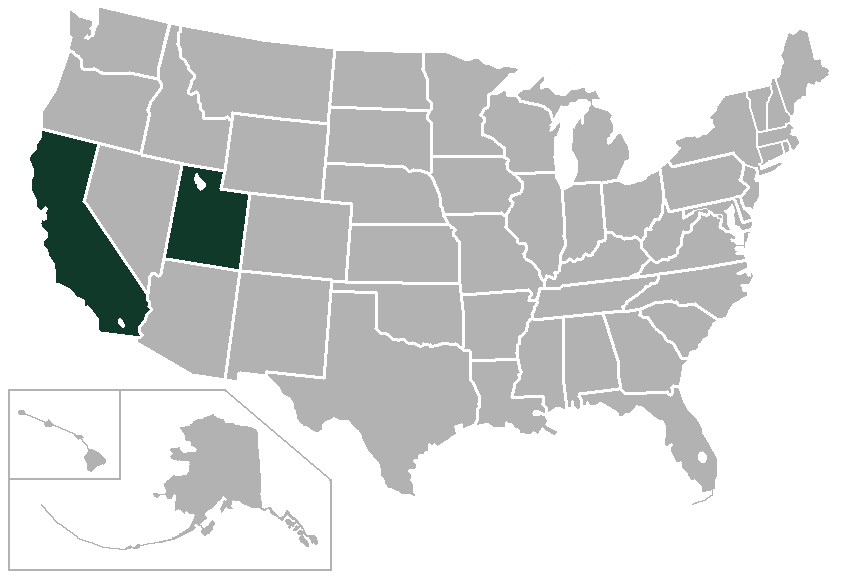
- Awarded for: the most outstanding basketball player in the American West Conference
- Country: United States

History
- First award: 1995
- Final award: 1996

The American West Conference Men's Basketball Player of the Year was an annual award given to the American West Conference's most outstanding player. The award was bestowed just twice (1995, 1996) coinciding with men's basketball being offered for only the 1994–95 and 1995–96 seasons. The American West Conference operated as a whole from 1993–94 to 1995–96. The award winners were Sean Allen from Southern Utah and Ben Larson from Cal Poly.

== Winners ==
Season	Player	School	Position	Class	Reference
1994–95	Sean Allen (Note: Sean Allen later changed his last name to McCaw, but while he was still in college he kept his birth name.)	Southern Utah	PF / C	Senior	
1995–96	Ben Larson	Cal Poly	PG	Freshman	

== Winners by school ==
School (year joined)	Winners	Years
Cal Poly (1993)	1	1996
Southern Utah (1993)	1	1995
Cal State Northridge (1993)	0	—
Sacramento State (1993)	0	—
UC Davis (1993) (Note: UC Davis joined the American West Conference as a charter member in 1993–94 when it was still a football-only conference. They left after one year, before basketball was offered beginning in 1994–95.)	0	—
