= Johnny Blake Peterson =

American rapist, murderer, and suspected serial killer (1960–1993)

- Mug shot of Peterson
- Born: September 12, 1960; Las Vegas, Nevada, U.S.
- Died: January 20, 1993 (aged 32); Las Vegas, Nevada, U.S.
- Conviction: N/A
- Penalty: N/A

Details
- Victims: 2–7+
- Span of crimes: 1979–1983
- Country: United States
- State: Nevada
- Date apprehended: N/A

Johnny Blake Peterson (September 12, 1960 – January 20, 1993) was an American rapist, murderer, and suspected serial killer who was posthumously linked via DNA to two murders committed in his native city of Las Vegas, Nevada, between 1979 and 1983. He was never considered a suspect in either killing during his lifetime and died in hospital from a drug overdose in 1993. Since his identification in 2021, authorities have announced that they are investigating Peterson in at least five other murders in the Las Vegas area, beginning in the late 1970s.

== Life ==
Johnny Blake Peterson was born in Las Vegas, Nevada, on September 12, 1960, and attended Western High School. After leaving school in 1977, Peterson worked as a freelance plasterer, got married, and had two children. It is known that Peterson was arrested for rape at some point during his lifetime, but it is unclear if he served time for this offense. On January 20, 1993, Peterson was admitted to the University Medical Center of Southern Nevada due to a drug overdose and died later that same day.

== Murders ==
On January 29, 1979, 16-year-old Kim Bryant, a student at Western High School, was waiting at a Dairy Queen across from the premises when she was abducted by Peterson, who drove away with her in his vehicle. Bryant's body was found less than a month later by a trio of teenagers hunting with BB guns in the area, who immediately notified authorities. Other sources claim that the body was found by motorcyclists riding in the desert and that her personal belongings had been scattered about the area.

Upon conducting interviews with Bryant's classmates, authorities learned that several had been approached by two strangers driving a silver-painted 1950s Chevrolet with primer spots and raised back wheels, who attempted to entice them into their car with offers to sell them jewelry. According to their description, one of the strangers appeared to be a young man no older than 19 with shaggy blond hair and droopy eyes, which would have fit Peterson's description at the time. However, it is currently unclear if Peterson was one of the two men or if this incident has any relation to the murder of Bryant.

On December 30, 1983, 22-year-old Diana Hanson, a college student who was visiting her family for the holidays, went out to jog in the western parts of Las Vegas. Somewhere along the way, she was intercepted by Peterson, who sexually assaulted and stabbed her to death. Hanson's body was found the following day by a man picking up firewood. As there was little evidence that could lead to an arrest, both cases went cold and remained unsolved for forty years.

== Identification ==
In the early 2020s, local philanthropist Justin Woo donated $5,000 to raise funds for cold case investigations to be reopened. Detectives gathered enough DNA evidence from the Bryant case to send it for testing at Othram. On November 29, 2021, they announced Peterson's DNA had officially been linked to the case, cementing him as the likely perpetrator.

Not long after, an anonymous acquaintance of Peterson contacted investigators and informed them that he might have been involved in Hanson's murder. In order to learn whether this was true, Peterson's DNA was compared to that collected in the Hanson case, and only two weeks later, it resulted in a positive match. Because of this, he was declared responsible for Hanson's murder as well, and both cases were officially closed.

The Las Vegas Metropolitan Police Department (LVMPD) have announced that they are investigating Peterson in at least five additional murders committed in the area during the late 1970s and early 1980s. They have emphasized that so far he remains only a suspect and have advised against labeling him a "serial killer" until DNA testing has officially finished.

In the aftermath of the identifications, surviving members from both victims' families have given interviews in which they expressed gratitude to Othram, the LVMPD, and Woo for helping solve Bryant and Hanson's murders.
