= Lawrence Guy =

American football player (born 1990)

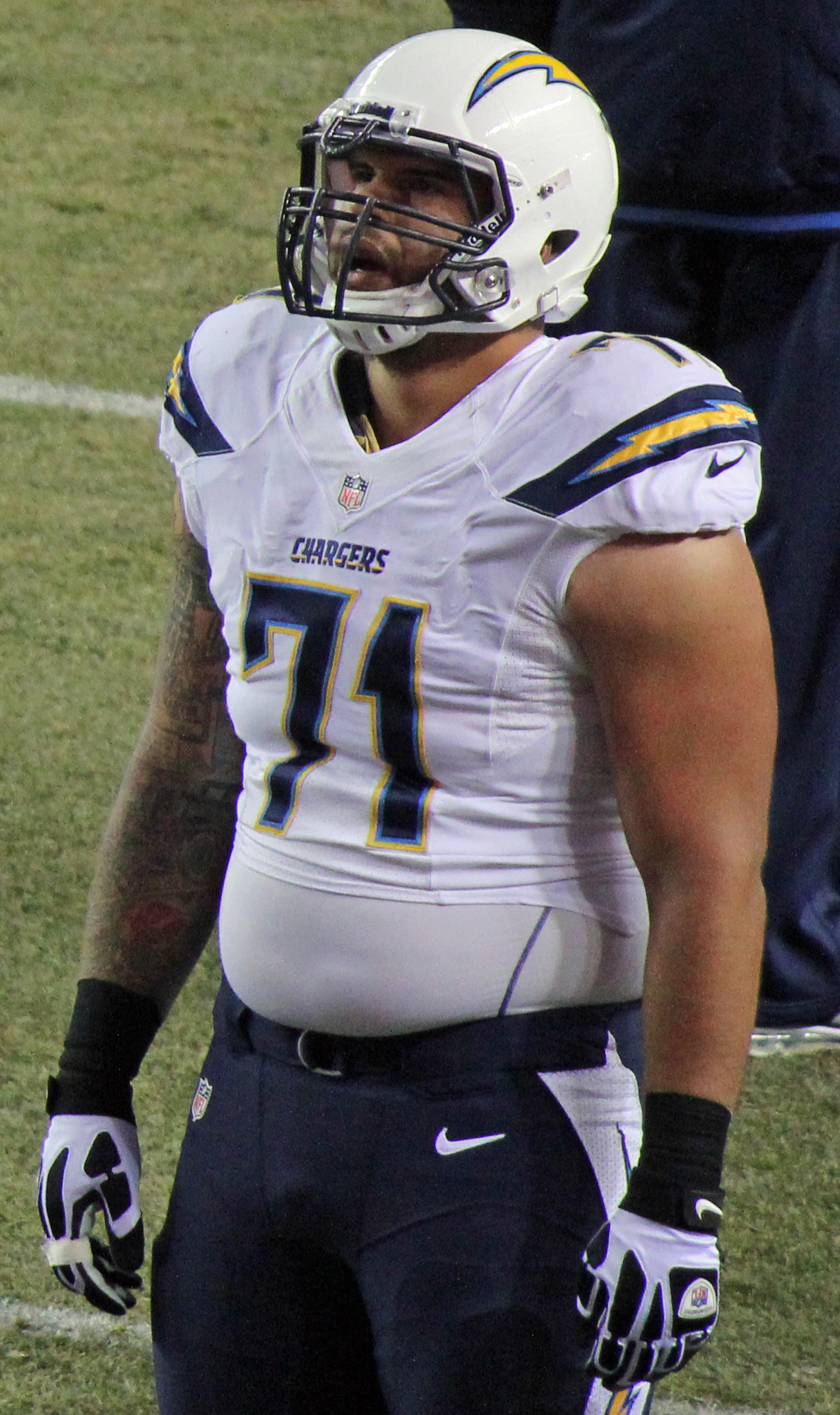
- Guy with the San Diego Chargers in 2013

No. 67, 71, 93, 74
- Position: Defensive tackle

Personal information
- Born: March 17, 1990 (age 36); Las Vegas, Nevada, U.S.
- Listed height: 6 ft 4 in (1.93 m)
- Listed weight: 315 lb (143 kg)

Career information
- High school: Western (Las Vegas)
- College: Arizona State (2008–2010)
- NFL draft: 2011: 7th round, 233rd overall pick

Career history
- Green Bay Packers (2011–2012); Indianapolis Colts (2012–2013); San Diego Chargers (2013–2014); Baltimore Ravens (2014–2016); New England Patriots (2017–2023); Cincinnati Bengals (2024)

Awards and highlights
- Super Bowl champion (LIII); New England Patriots All-2010s Team; Freshman All-American (2008)

Career NFL statistics
- Total tackles: 509
- Sacks: 17
- Forced fumbles: 2
- Fumble recoveries: 6
- Pass deflections: 9
- Interceptions: 1
- Stats at Pro Football Reference

Lawrence Thomas Guy (born March 17, 1990) is an American former professional football player who was a defensive tackle in the National Football League (NFL). He played college football for the Arizona State Sun Devils and was selected by the Green Bay Packers in the seventh round of the 2011 NFL draft. He also played for the Indianapolis Colts, San Diego Chargers, Baltimore Ravens, New England Patriots, and Cincinnati Bengals.

== Early life ==
As a child, Guy was placed in special education classes, as he had been diagnosed with attention deficit hyperactivity disorder, dyslexia, and dyscalculia.

Guy attended Western High School in Las Vegas, Nevada, where he recorded 238 tackles (171 solo), 30.5 sacks and three fumble recoveries in his three seasons. As a senior in 2007, he totaled 102 tackles (69 solo), 15.5 quarterback sacks and one fumble recovery.

Considered a four-star recruit by Rivals.com, Guy was listed as the No. 13 defensive tackle prospect in the nation. He committed to the Sun Devils on December 19, 2007, choosing ASU over Arizona, Michigan, Nebraska, Oklahoma, Oregon, and Tennessee.

== College career ==
As a true freshman, Guy played in all 12 games of the season, starting the final eight. He totaled 44 tackles (17 solo), 10.0 tackles for loss (for −22 yards), two sacks (for −9 yards) and one fumble recovery that he returned for a touchdown. Guy's 44 tackles were the second-highest among Pac-10 defensive tackles on the season.

Guy subsequently earned consensus All-Freshman honors, as he was named to FWAA′s Freshman All-America team, The Sporting News′ All-Freshman team, and College Football News′ All-Freshman first-team.

== Professional career ==
Pre-draft measurables
Height	Weight	Arm length	Hand span	Wingspan	40-yard dash	10-yard split	20-yard split	20-yard shuttle	Three-cone drill	Vertical jump	Broad jump	Bench press	Wonderlic
6 ft 4 1/8 in (1.93 m)	305 lb (138 kg)	32 3/4 in (0.83 m)	10 3/4 in (0.27 m)	6 ft 6 5/8 in (2.00 m)	4.98 s	1.81 s	2.93 s	4.43 s	7.34 s	29.0 in (0.74 m)	8 ft 8 in (2.64 m)	28 reps	17
All values from NFL Combine/Pro Day

=== Green Bay Packers ===
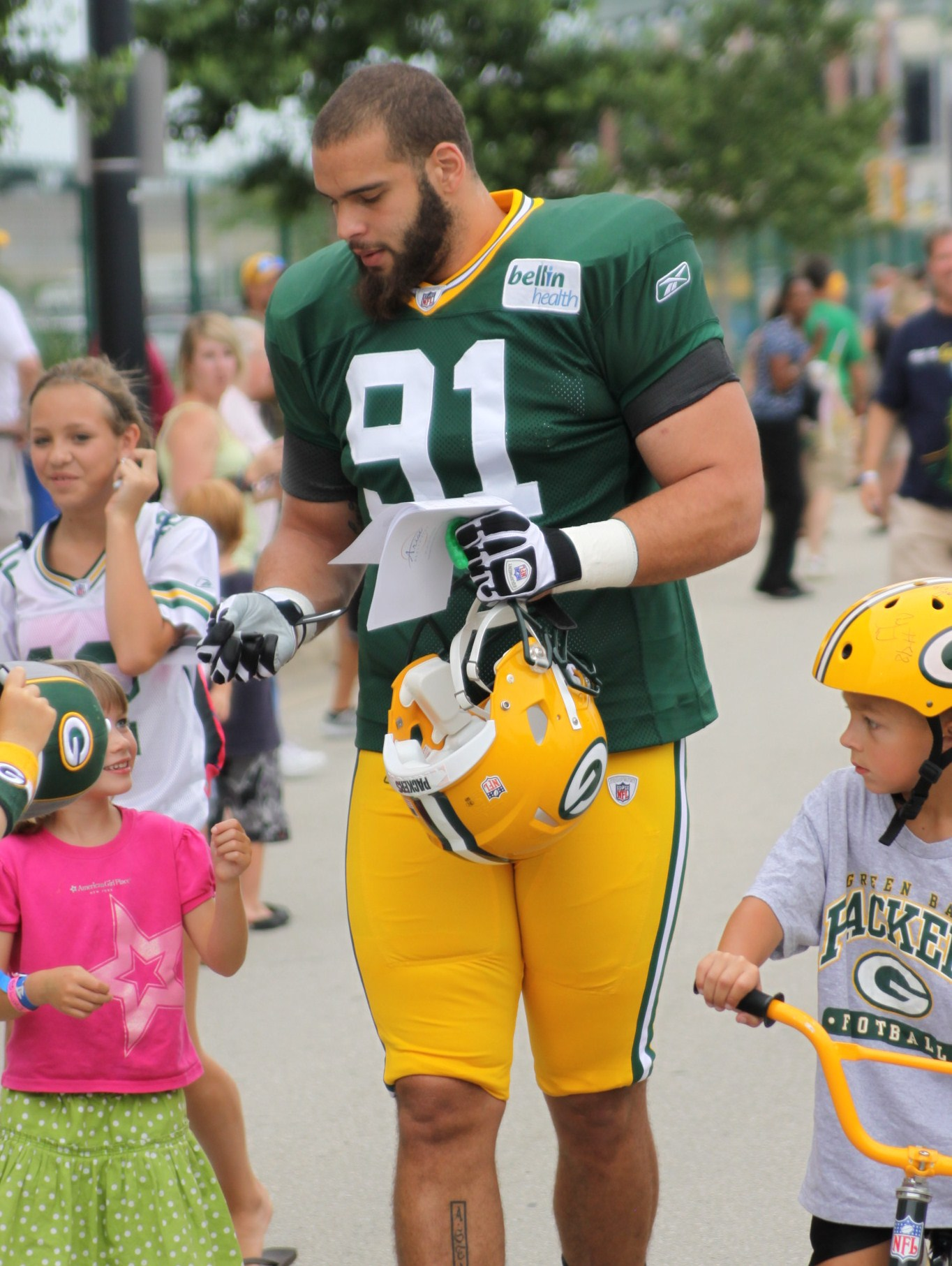
Guy with the Packers in 2011

Guy was selected in the seventh round (233rd overall) of the 2011 NFL draft by the Green Bay Packers. He spent the season on injured reserve. Guy was one of the final cuts of the 2012 season, but he was re-signed to the practice squad on September 3, 2012.

=== Indianapolis Colts ===
On October 17, 2012, the Indianapolis Colts signed Guy from the Packers' practice squad. In 9 games with the Colts, he recorded 21 tackles (15 solo) and 1 sack.

=== San Diego Chargers ===
On October 8, 2013, Guy was claimed off waivers by the San Diego Chargers. Guy appeared in 10 games for the Chargers in 2013 where he had 16 tackles. In 2014 Guy appeared in just 3 games before being waived by the team.

=== Baltimore Ravens ===
On September 24, 2014, Guy was claimed off waivers by the Baltimore Ravens after spending the first 3 weeks of the regular season with the Chargers.

On October 11, 2015, in a home game against the Cleveland Browns Guy recorded two sacks on quarterback Josh McCown.

Guy finished the 2015 season with 46 tackles and 4.5 sacks.

During the 2016 season Guy recorded 28 tackles, 1 sack and 1 forced fumble.

=== New England Patriots ===
On March 11, 2017, Guy signed a four-year, $20 million contract with the New England Patriots. In Guy's first season with the Patriots, he recorded 58 tackles and 1 sack. In the divisional round of the playoffs, Guy recorded 2 tackles in the victory over the Tennessee Titans. In the AFC Championship Game against the Jacksonville Jaguars, Guy had 6 tackles and 1 sack to help the Patriots reach the Super Bowl. In Super Bowl LII, Guy recorded 6 tackles, but the Patriots lost 41–33 to the Philadelphia Eagles.

Throughout the 2018 season, Guy appeared in all 16 games starting 15 of them. He recorded 59 tackles, 1 sack and 1 forced fumble. Guy helped the Patriots reach Super Bowl LIII where they defeated the Los Angeles Rams 13–3.

During Week 8 of the 2019 season, Guy recorded his first career interception off of a botched shovel pass by Browns quarterback Baker Mayfield in the 27–13 win. In week 9 against the Ravens, Guy recovered a fumble forced by teammate Kyle Van Noy on running back Mark Ingram II in the 37–20 loss. In week 11 against the Eagles, Guy recovered a fumble forced by teammate Danny Shelton on Carson Wentz in the 17–10 win.

In Week 7 of the 2020 season against the San Francisco 49ers, Guy recorded his first sack of the season on former teammate Jimmy Garoppolo during the 33–6 loss.

On March 30, 2021, Guy signed a four-year, $11.5 million contract extension with the Patriots. He started all 17 games, recording 60 tackles and 1.5 sacks.

Guy returned as a starting defensive tackle in 2022. He started 14 games, recording 46 tackles and two sacks.

Guy started in 14 games and played in all 17 games for the 2023 season. He recorded 38 tackles. He was released on February 19, 2024.

=== Cincinnati Bengals ===
On September 17, 2024, Guy was signed by the Cincinnati Bengals. He was released on November 2.

=== Retirement ===
On October 24, 2025, Guy announced his retirement from football and signed a one-day contract with the New England Patriots to retire with the team.

== NFL career statistics ==
=== Regular season ===
Year	Team	Games		Tackles					Interceptions					Fumbles			
Year	Team	GP	GS	Cmb	Solo	Ast	Sck	TfL	Int	Yds	TD	Lng	PD	FF	FR	Yds	TD
2012	IND	9	2	18	12	6	1.0	2	0	0	0	0	0	0	0	0	0
2013	IND	2	0	4	3	1	0.0	1	0	0	0	0	1	0	0	0	0
2013	SD	10	0	16	9	7	0.0	1	0	0	0	0	3	0	0	0	0
2014	SD	3	0	0	0	0	0.0	0	0	0	0	0	0	0	0	0	0
2014	BAL	11	1	16	2	14	0.0	0	0	0	0	0	1	0	1	6	0
2015	BAL	16	6	46	29	17	4.5	8	0	0	0	0	1	0	0	0	0
2016	BAL	16	10	28	14	14	1.0	5	0	0	0	0	0	1	1	0	0
2017	NE	16	15	58	34	24	1.0	6	0	0	0	0	1	0	0	0	0
2018	NE	16	15	59	25	34	1.0	1	0	0	0	0	0	1	0	0	0
2019	NE	16	16	61	35	26	3.0	5	1	5	0	5	1	0	2	0	0
2020	NE	14	14	57	37	20	2.0	4	0	0	0	0	0	0	1	0	0
2021	NE	17	17	60	37	23	1.5	2	0	0	0	0	0	0	1	0	0
2022	NE	14	14	46	18	28	2.0	3	0	0	0	0	0	0	0	0	0
2023	NE	17	12	38	16	22	0.0	1	0	0	0	0	1	0	0	0	0
Career		177	122	507	271	236	17.0	39	1	5	0	5	9	2	6	6	0

=== Postseason ===
Year	Team	Games		Tackles					Interceptions					Fumbles			
Year	Team	GP	GS	Cmb	Solo	Ast	Sck	TfL	Int	Yds	TD	Lng	PD	FF	FR	Yds	TD
2012	IND	1	1	4	2	2	0.0	0	0	0	0	0	0	0	1	0	0
2013	SD	2	0	2	1	1	0.0	0	0	0	0	0	0	0	0	0	0
2014	BAL	2	0	1	0	1	0.0	0	0	0	0	0	0	0	0	0	0
2017	NE	3	3	14	9	5	1.0	1	0	0	0	0	0	0	0	0	0
2018	NE	3	3	6	3	3	0.5	0	0	0	0	0	0	0	0	0	0
2019	NE	1	1	2	2	0	0.0	0	0	0	0	0	0	0	0	0	0
2021	NE	1	1	4	1	3	0.0	0	0	0	0	0	1	0	0	0	0
Career		13	9	33	18	15	1.5	1	0	0	0	0	1	0	1	0	0

== Charity work ==
In 2022, Guy was New England's nominee for the Walter Payton NFL Man of the Year Award. He and his wife operate the Lawrence Guy Family Foundation.

== Personal life ==
Guy is vegan. He first began transitioning into a plant-based diet in 2019.
