= Killing of Jonathan Lewis =

2023 killing of a 17-year-old student in Las Vegas, Nevada

Jonathan Lewis Jr.
- Born: Jonathan Edward Lewis Jr. January 10, 2006; Las Vegas, Nevada, U.S.
- Died: November 1, 2023 (aged 17); Las Vegas, Nevada, U.S.
- Cause of death: Homicide (blunt trauma)
- Education: Rancho High School
- Parents: Jonathan Lewis Sr. (father); Mellisa Ready (mother)

On November 1, 2023, Jonathan Edward Lewis Jr., a 17-year-old student at Rancho High School in Las Vegas, Nevada, U.S., was attacked by a mob of students at the school. Lewis had been standing up for a friend who was bullied by the students. He died from the injuries sustained during the assault on November 7, 2023.

== Background ==
Jonathan Lewis Jr. aspired to become an artist, being interested in drawing, photography and painting and a connoisseur in music, especially hip-hop. He was also considering joining the military, like his grandfather who served in the U.S. Navy. At the time of his death, Lewis lived with his mother and had plans to move to Austin, Texas with his father.

== Incident ==
The incident that led to the death of Jonathan Lewis reportedly began when earlier in the week, a group of bullies stole a pair of wireless headphones and possibly a marijuana vape pen from a student, who was a friend of Lewis and smaller than him, and threw him into a trash can. Following that, the students agreed to meet in a back alley around a corner from campus to fight, which happened after classes on Wednesday, November 1, 2023. Initially, Jonathan was not planned to be involved in the altercation but accompanied his friend to the alleyway where the incident took place. They faced a mob of approximately 15 students before being swarmed, pushed against a fence and forced onto the ground, where he was punched, kicked and stomped on by 10 individuals.

After the assault, Lewis was found badly beaten and unconscious by a person who carried him back to campus, where the school staff called 911. He was taken to the University Medical Center of Southern Nevada, where he was hospitalized and placed on life support. Doctors soon determined he had "nonsurvivable head trauma". Six days later on November 7, Lewis was declared medically brain dead. An autopsy performed by the Clark County coroner's office determined that the cause of death was blunt force trauma.

== Investigation ==
Nine juveniles were taken into custody and faced murder charges. The suspects ranged in age from 13 to 17 and were students at Rancho High School. Four of the teenagers, identified as Gianni Robinson, Damien Hernandez, Treavion Randolph and Dontral Beaver, were scheduled to be tried as adults since they were in the age range of 16 to 17. The other teenagers were ordered to be held in juvenile detention center until the certification hearings could be held on December 6, 2023, due to their ages ranging from 13 to 15. The remaining student who participated in the beating is still at large. In January 2024, a 15-year-old pled guilty to voluntary manslaughter and was to be committed to Child Correctional Services. In February, two more of the defendants under 16, including the 13-year-old, pled guilty to voluntary manslaughter.

On August 2, 2024, the District Attorney backtracked and allowed the four older teenagers to plead guilty to manslaughter as juveniles. The deal was contingent on all four of them accepting it. If any of them backed out of the deal, they would again be charged in adult court. Lewis' mother Mellisa Ready has criticized the deal, about which she stated she had not been notified, telling KLAS-TV, "You cannot jump on a human being's head, stomp on him, and think that they're going to remain alive after. They knew he was going to die, and that's how I feel – and they're letting them get away with murder." She also said, "There is no justice for my son Jonathan Lewis, that was stomped to death and murdered while 20 people stood there and did nothing more than film it and broadcast it to social media." On September 4, 2024, the four struck the deal, pleading guilty to voluntary manslaughter. Karen A. Connolly, an attorney for Damien Hernandez, told CBS News, "Though not one of the major participants, Damien deeply regrets his participation in the melee which resulted in Jonathan's tragic death. He accepts full responsibility and will accept whatever punishment is meted out." Later in the month, the four were sent to a juvenile detention center to receive counselling and participate in rehabilitative programs.

On August 12, 2025, an investigative report aired discussing concerns and frustrations in the community regarding the rehiring and promotion of Lewis' former Principal to School Associate Superintendent.

== Lawsuits ==
On April 9, 2025, Mellisa Ready filed a lawsuit against the Clark County School District, accusing them and Sandra Corona, the owner of the property where the beating occurred, of wrongful death and negligence. The lawsuit alleges that the beating took place in an area "adjacent to and partially on" Corona's property in the 1300 block of North 21st Street and the location was a "known gathering spot" for students and that there had been prior fights and criminal activity in the vicinity. In addition, Ready states that the district "failed to take reasonable steps to supervise students in or near the area, implement preventive measures, or notify law enforcement", the perpetrators "were known to the school administration and had exhibited prior aggressive or violent behavior", and there had been at least one altercation or conflict involving Lewis or his peers previously and school staff "were on notice or should have been on notice of escalating tensions." In June 2025, Corona countered that it was not her responsibility to prevent the assault, arguing that under state law regarding trespasser liability, a property owner has no independent duty to advise of dangerous conditions or potential dangers to other people. However, Ready rejected this argument, with her attorney Richard Young stating that she did not concede that Corona was free from responsibility and there was also no evidence that the people involved in the attack were trespassers as defined by state statute.

On August 7, 2025, Jonathan Lewis Sr. filed a lawsuit against the Clark County School District similar to the one filed by the victim's mother.
