= Western High School (Nevada) =

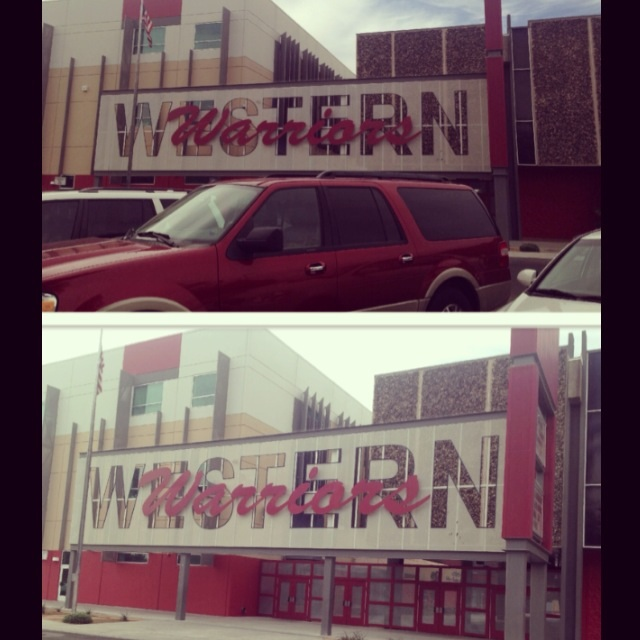
- Western High School front door

Location
- 4601 West Bonanza Road; Las Vegas, Nevada 89107; United States; 36°10′32″N 115°12′12″W

Information
- School type: Public high school
- Motto: "Honor the past, challenge the future"
- Established: 1960
- School district: Clark County School District
- Staff: 109.50 (FTE)
- Grades: 9–12
- Enrollment: 2,745 (2023–2024)
- Student to teacher ratio: 25.07
- Colors: Columbia Blue, Red, White
- Team name: Warriors
- Rival: Ed W. Clark High School
- Website: www.westernhswarriors.org

Western High School is a public high school under the Clark County School District in Nevada, United States. The school opened in 1960, and was the third high school built in Las Vegas, Nevada, after Las Vegas High School (1931) and Rancho High School (1954). The campus is located at 4601 West Bonanza Road, Las Vegas, Nevada. In March 2011 Western was identified as one of five "persistently" low-performing schools in Clark County, Nevada, eligible for federal School Improvement grants. Under the turnaround model for school improvement Western introduced a curriculum of science, technology, engineering and math.

== Notable alumni ==
- Fred Cole (musician), lead singer for the Weeds, The Lollipop Shoppe, Dead Moon
- Lawrence Guy, defensive tackle for the New England Patriots
- Corinna Harney, Playboy's Playmate of the Month for August 1991 and Playboy's Playmate of the Year 1992
- Frank Hawkins, former NFL player
- Nicole (Ellingwood) Malachowski, first female pilot for the United States Air Force Thunderbirds
- Sean (Allen) McCaw, professional basketball player
- Nick Oshiro, drummer for Static-X
- Johnny Blake Peterson, murderer and suspected serial killer
- Robin Sendlein, former NFL linebacker, Minnesota Vikings & Miami Dolphins
- Brett Sperry, gallerist, video game pioneer, and Las Vegas developer
- Ronnie Vannucci Jr., drummer for The Killers
