= Sean McCaw =

American basketball player and coach

Personal information
- Born: July 26, 1973 (age 53) Queens, New York, U.S.
- Listed height: 6 ft 8 in (2.03 m)
- Listed weight: 195 lb (88 kg)

Career information
- High school: Western (Las Vegas, Nevada)
- College: Arizona (1991–1992); Dixie State (1992–1993); Southern Utah (1993–1995)
- NBA draft: 1995: undrafted
- Playing career: 1995–2008
- Position: Power forward / center
- Number: 32, 7
- Coaching career: 2008–2016

Career history

Playing
- 1995–1999: Kapfenberg Bulls
- 1999–2000: Traiskirchen Lions
- 2000–2001: Rueil Athletic Club Basket
- 2001: Aveiro Esgueira
- 2001–2002: CAB Madeira
- 2002–2003: Baskets Oldenburg
- 2003: Kapfenberg Bulls
- 2003–2004: Leicester Riders
- 2004–2006: Geneva Devils
- 2006–2008: Science City Jena

Coaching
- 2008: Science City Jena
- 2009–2012: Medi Bayreuth – youth
- 2012–2013: Cuxhaven BasCats (assistant)
- 2013–2016: Löwen Braunschweig – youth

Career highlights
- Austrian League champion (2000); Austrian League All-Star (2000); American West Player of the Year (1995); First-team All-American West (1995)

Sean Jamel McCaw (born Sean Allen; July 26, 1973) is an American-Austrian former professional basketball player and coach. His professional playing career spanned from 1995 to 2008 and his coaching career spanned from 2008 to 2016. McCaw's career took him to Austria, France, Germany, Portugal, Switzerland, and the United Kingdom. During his college career in the United States, McCaw was named the 1995 American West Conference Player of the Year.

He currently resides in Germany with his family and works as an educator at an international school.

== Playing career ==
=== High school ===
McCaw was born in New York City but grew up in Las Vegas, Nevada. He attended Western High School from 1987 to 1991 but only played basketball his senior season due to academic ineligibility his first three years. In his lone season, McCaw averaged 16.6 points and 11.2 rebounds per game and also set the school single season blocked shots record with 163. The Western High Warriors also won their second of back-to-back Class 3A state titles. McCaw was named first-team all-state.

=== College ===
A month after his senior season ended, McCaw signed a National Letter of Intent to play for the University of Arizona Wildcats without having visited the school. He wanted to play for the alma mater of his basketball idol, Sean Elliott, and was the "least publicized of the Wildcat recruits."

McCaw's freshman season was statistically unremarkable and ended prematurely. After appearing in only 11 games while averaging 2.1 points and 0.8 rebounds per game, McCaw was placed on indefinite suspension in February by coach Lute Olson for "failure to fulfill the team's academic requirements." His suspension was team-related as he was eligible under both NCAA and Arizona Board of Regents standards. The suspension effectively ended McCaw's time at Arizona; he transferred to Dixie State University (which was still a junior college at the time) for his sophomore season.

After one successful season at Dixie, McCaw returned to NCAA Division I competition as a junior in 1993–94, this time for Southern Utah University to play for the Thunderbirds, who were in their final season as an independent. The team finished with a 16–11 record but McCaw saw personal success. He averaged 16.8 points and 6.6 rebounds per game, leading the team in each category. He also recorded 53 blocks, which was a then-school single season record.

Heading into his senior season in 1994–95, Southern Utah joined the American West Conference, which was in its first year offering basketball. Before the season, the media projected McCaw as one of the conference's best players. He lived up to the billing by averaging team-leading 15.2 points and 5.9 rebounds per game, and surpassed Southern Utah's then-school record for blocks in a career (61). He led the Thunderbirds to win the American West regular season championship with a 6–0 conference record (17–11 overall) as well as the conference tournament championship. Southern Utah was not awarded a bid to the NCAA tournament, however, due to the NCAA rule where there must be six member institutions in a conference to qualify (it only had five). For his effort, McCaw was named to the all-conference first-team and won the first ever American West Conference Player of the Year award. During his three-year NCAA Division I career, McCaw recorded 886 points, 345 rebounds, and 116 blocks.

In 2017, Southern Utah University inducted him into their athletics hall of fame despite having only played for the school for two years.

==== NCAA Division I statistics ====
Legend
GP	Games played	GS	Games started	MPG	Minutes per game
FG%	Field goal percentage	3P%	3-point field goal percentage	FT%	Free throw percentage
RPG	Rebounds per game	APG	Assists per game	SPG	Steals per game
BPG	Blocks per game	PPG	Points per game	**Bold**	Career high

Year	Team	GP	GS	MPG	FG%	3P%	FT%	RPG	APG	SPG	BPG	PPG
1991–92	Arizona	11	0		.467	.000	.643	0.8	0.0	0.2	0.3	2.1
1992–93	N/A											
1993–94	Southern Utah	**27**	**26**	**31.7**	.504	.000	.604	**6.6**	1.1	**1.3**	2.0	**16.8**
1994–95	Southern Utah	**27**	25	29.7	**.540**	**.400**	**.656**	5.9	**1.9**	1.0	**2.2**	15.2
Career		65	51		.519	.367	.628	5.3	1.2	1.0	1.8	13.6

=== Professional ===
McCaw went undrafted in the ensuing 1995 NBA draft. He decided to pursue his professional career in the European market due to the 1995 NBA season lockout. Between 1995 and 2008, McCaw played professionally in six different countries, won multiple titles, and became a naturalized Austrian citizen so he could compete for their national team. He never returned to the United States to attempt a career in the NBA.

== Coaching career ==
In February 2008, McCaw took over as player-coach of Science City Jena in Jena, Germany. He retired from playing at the end of the 2007–08 season and remained as head coach for the 2008–09 season. He parted ways with Jena in December 2008. In 2009, he took over as the head coach for Medi Bayreuth's youth team, a position he stayed in for three seasons. McCaw left Medi in 2012 and spent four more years as a coach for two different teams before retiring from coaching as well.

== Personal life ==
McCaw stayed in Germany after his playing and coaching career days ended. He lives in Braunschweig Lower Saxony where Sean works as an educator at an international school. He is also an author, having written Same Name Different Game: Your Guide For A Successful European Rookie Season.

== See also ==
- Ben Larson – the only other American West Conference Player of the Year (1996)
