= Clark County School District =

School district in Nevada, US

Address
- 5100 W Sahara Avenue Las Vegas, Nevada, 89146; United States
- Coordinates: 36°08′44″N 115°12′43″W

District information
- Type: Public
- Grades: Pre-kindergarten – 12
- Established: September 16, 1956; 70 years ago
- Superintendent: Jhone Ebert
- School board: Elected Members; Emily Stevens – President, District A; Irene Bustamante Adams – Vice President, District F; Lydia Dominguez – Clerk, District B; Lorena Biassotti – Member, District E; Linda P. Cavadios – Member, District G; Tameka Henry – Member, District C; Brenda Zamora – Member, District D; Appointed Trustees; Isaac Barron – Member, City of North Las Vegas; Ramona Esparza-Stoffregan – Member, City of Henderson; Adam Johnson – Member, City of Las Vegas; Lisa Satory – Member, Clark County
- Budget: $3.813 billion (2021)

Students and staff
- Students: 309,787 (2022–23)
- Faculty: 15,452.20 (FTE)
- Staff: 16,473.40 (FTE)
- Student–teacher ratio: 20.05

Other information
- Telephone: (702) 799-2273
- Website: ccsd.net

The Clark County School District (CCSD) is the public school district serving Clark County in the U.S. state of Nevada. It is the largest school district in Nevada and the fifth-largest school district in the United States with 270,975 enrolled students for the 2026–2027 school year. The district also operates Vegas PBS (KLVX) television, a PBS-member station licensed to the district's board of trustees.

CCSD is the largest employer in both Clark County and Nevada with 43,786 employees as of October 2024. The district operates 373 schools, composed of 233 elementary schools, 61 middle/junior high schools, 54 high schools, 21 alternative schools, and four special schools. It has limited involvement with charter schools, and with the exception of providing some bus service, does not have any involvement with the private schools in the county.

In 1956, CCSD was formed from dozens of smaller school districts after Nevada adopted laws to consolidate and unify school districts state-wide based on county, with Carson City treated as a county as it is an independent city.

== History ==
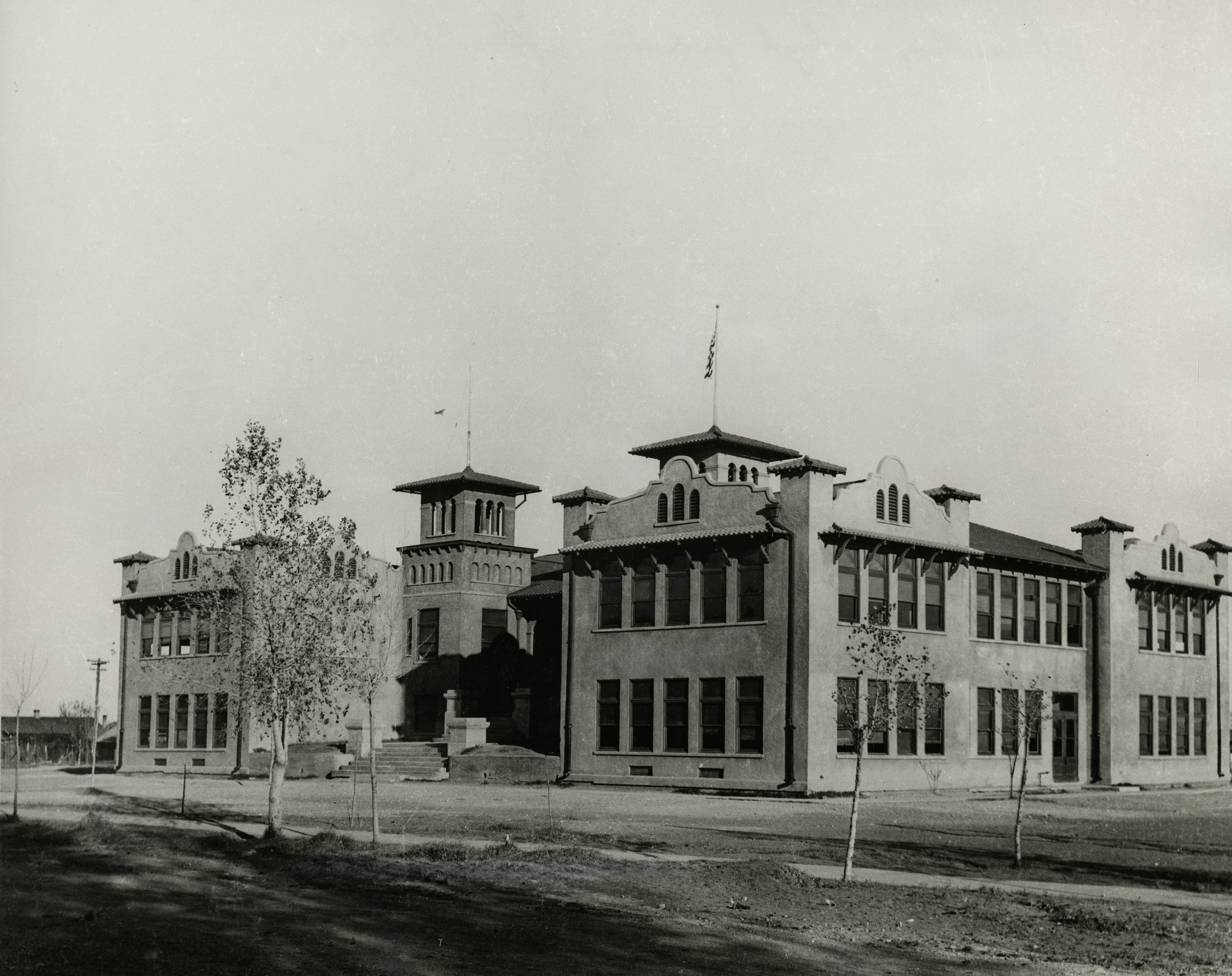
Las Vegas Grammar School (1911-1960) the first permanent school house in Las Vegas.

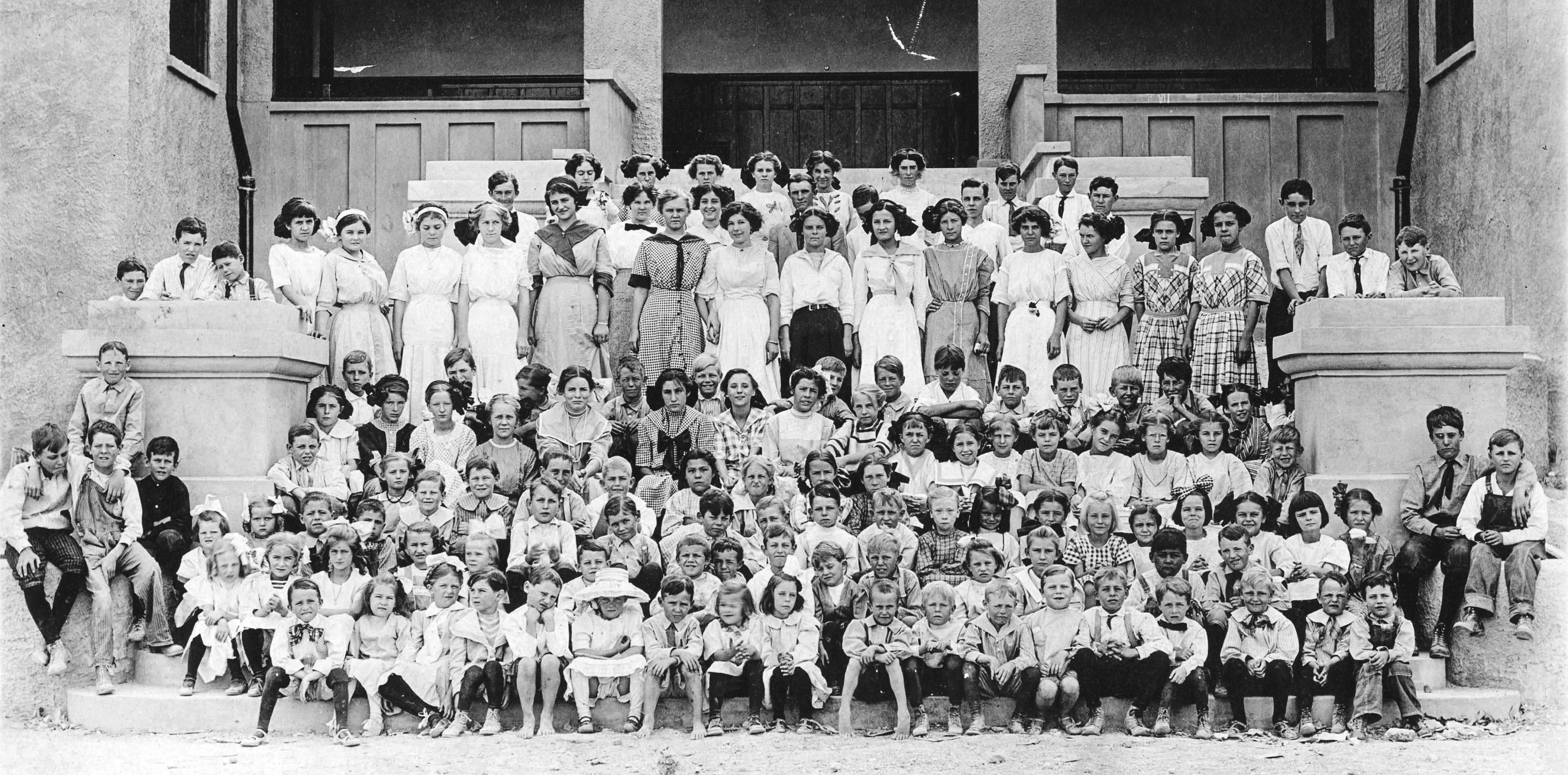
Student body of Las Vegas Grammar School, grades 1–12 circa 1912.

The first Western pioneers to settle Clark County were members of LDS church, represented by fewer than 100 settlers in 1851. The county was part of the Utah Territory until 1867, when Utah gave the region Nevada. At the time, Nevada was only three years old at the time the area was given to it. The first permanent settlement, St. Thomas, was established in 1865 and built the region's first school made of adobe.

Nevada law previously allowed county commissioners to establish a school district if there were five or more school-aged children in a community. As a result, there were sometimes very large numbers of school districts within counties with very few people.

In 1956, Governor Charles H. Russell called a special session of the Nevada Legislature to pass a law to reorganize public education in Nevada, consolidating 208 school districts into 17 county-wide school districts, including the state capitol, Carson City, which is an independent city. This helped rural school districts with few students and teachers achieve economies of scale and provide higher-quality education by distributing tax revenue more equitably.

In September 1956, the Clark County School District was created from the consolidation of the following school districts: Blue Diamond, Boulder City Union, Boulder City High School, Educational Consolidated District 1, Moapa Valley High School, Virgin Valley High School, Eldorado (Nelson), Enterprise, Garnet, Goodsprings, Basic High School, Indian Springs, Las Vegas Union, Las Vegas High School, Paradise, Searchlight, Sloan, and Whitney.

During the 1960s and 1970s, CCSD became a focal point for desegregation efforts. Although Nevada did not have explicit segregation under the law, social customs and private businesses enforced de facto segregation depending on the context, one of which was in schooling. In Kelly vs Guinn in 1972, the Ninth Circuit Court of Appeals ruled that a lower court's order stand, requiring CCSD to implement policy to desegregate schools. Kelly vs. Guinn prompted initiatives such as busing students and creating specialized programs to try to overcome long-standing segregation in West Las Vegas.

== Reorganization ==
In 2015, the Nevada Legislature passed Assembly Bill 394, directing a reorganization of the district into “local school precincts” with greater school-level authority. In 2017, the Legislature passed the bill, which as of the 2025 session has been codified as NRS 388G.500–.810.

Among other things, it created school organizational teams (SOTs), required school-level plans of operation, and assigned certain budget and staffing authorities to precincts. The legislation's purpose was to shift power from the central school district offices to the school administrators with the hope of producing better outcomes.

During development and early implementation, the district's central offices challenged parts of the bill and its implementation; reporting noted legal disputes and requests to halt parts of the overhaul before the framework was finalized. The legislature also convened an interim working group in 2017–2018 to address SOT implementation and related issues.

=== Implementation ===
By the 2019–2020 period, schools operated under the reorgnanization framework with SOTs and school-level plans of operation. Coverage emphasized school-site input over budgets and staffing, with continuing debates about the scope of authorities retained by the central office versus those delegated to precincts.

In 2020, the CCSD school administrator union sued, alleging the district violated the reorganization law by limiting schools’ final say in hiring decisions, partly due to the uncertainty about how the NRS 388G's hiring provisions should function in practice.

=== District's failure to comply ===
State oversight actions intensified in the early 2020s. In September 2022, the State Board approved consequences for noncompliance with the reorganization law amid concerns about district-level policies and dispute-resolution processes tied to NRS 388G.

In 2024, state officials scrutinized the district's budget practices and reorganization compliance. Reporting noted that the Department of Education reviewed the district's responses for potential noncompliance and indicated a corrective action plan could be required under state law. In November 2024, Governor Joe Lombardo and Superintendent Jhone Ebert, who became CCSD superintendent in 2025, appointed a compliance monitor to CCSD and demanded corrective action, citing noncompliance with NRS 387 and NRS 388G affecting local school precincts’ rights and information flow.

=== Rollback ===
By 2025, proposals surfaced to scale back or revise elements of the reorganization due to questions about the effectiveness of the legislation. The Clark County Education Association, the teachers' union, criticized the model's results, while some community members warned that rolling it back could have unintended consequences. The legislative session ended without passage of a major rollback, leaving NRS 388G in place pending future action.

== Growth and decline ==
Between 1910 and 2020, Clark County's population increased from just over 3,000 residents to 2.25 million. The rapid pace of growth created consistent challenges for the school district, among them a lack of teachers and funds to build new schools quickly enough.

In 1956, when the district was formed from the consolidation of all school districts in the county, the district had 20,000 students. During the 11 year period between 1989 and 2000, enrollment increased from around 111,000 student to 215,000

In 2012, voters failed to pass a school construction bond. By 2014, the district was overwhelmed with new students as the economy recovered from the effects of the Great Recession. Elementary schools were operating at 117.6% of planned capacity, with some schools at almost 200%.

In 2018, enrollment decline for the first time in the district's history. For the 2017–2018 school year, the district enrolled 327,496 students, the largest number of students ever enrolled in the district during a school year. The following school year, 2018–2019, the district enrolled 325,081 students. From 2017 to 2025, the number of students enrolled in district schools declined from 327,496 to 286,985. In 2025, the deputy superintendent of Nevada Department of Education attributed the decline to declining birth rates, a slow-down in relocation to Southern Nevada, and the growth of charter schools, private schools, and homeschooling.

== Governance and leadership ==
=== Board of trustees ===
The school district is governed by the board of trustees composed of seven voting, elected members and four nonelected, nonvoting members appointed by the city councils of Las Vegas, Henderson, and North Las Vegas and the Clark County Commission. Trustees serve staggered four year terms. Starting in 2027, appointed school board members will gain voting rights.

Board of School Trustees Clark County School District
| District | Member | Since |
|---|---|---|
| A | Emily Stevens | 2025 |
| B | Lydia Dominguez | 2025 |
| C | Tameka Henry | 2025 |
| D | Brenda Zamora | 2023 |
| E | Lorena Biassotti | 2025 |
| F | Irene Bustamante Adams | 2023 |
| G | Linda P. Cavazos | 2017 |
| Henderson | Ramona Esparza-Stoffregan | 2024 |
| Las Vegas | Adam Johnson | 2024 |
| North Las Vegas | Isaac Barron | 2024 |
| Clark County | Lisa Satory | 2024 |

=== Superintendent ===
Day-to-day operations are overseen by the superintendent. Since April 2025, Jhone Ebert has served as CCSD superintendent. Previously, Ebert served as the Nevada superintendent for public instruction overseeing the Nevada Department of Education. Ebert is the first woman to be CCSD superintendent on a permanent basis. Ebert began her career as a math teacher Von Tobel Middle School in Las Vegas in the 1990s.

Ebert's predecessor, Jesus Jara, was described by The Nevada Independent as presiding over six years of "district financial woes, the pandemic, tensions between him, the school board, lawmakers and the district's teachers union and a recent scandal involving a probe into the district's use of its federal COVID relief funds." Jara became superintendent in 2018 after a slim, 5–4 vote from the board.

Clark County School District Superintendents
| Name | Tenure | Note |
|---|---|---|
| R. Guild Gray | 1956–1961 | |
| Harvey N. Dondero | 1961 | interim |
| Leland B. Newcomer | 1961–1965 | |
| James Mason | 1966–1969 | |
| Kenny Guinn | 1969–1978 | |
| Claude G. Perkins | 1978–1981 | |
| Charles Silvestri | 1981–1982 | interim |
| Robert E. Wentz | 1982–1989 | |
| Brian Cram | 1989–2000 | |
| Carlos A. Garcia | 2000–2005 | |
| Walt Rulffes and Augustin Orci | 2005–2006 | co-interim |
| Walt Rulffes | 2006–2010 | |
| Dwight D. Jones | 2010–2013 | |
| Pat Skorkowsky | 2013–2018 | |
| Jesús F. Jara | 2018–2024 | |
| Brenda Larsen-Mitchell | 2024–2025 | interim |
| Jhone Ebert | 2025–present | |

== School police ==
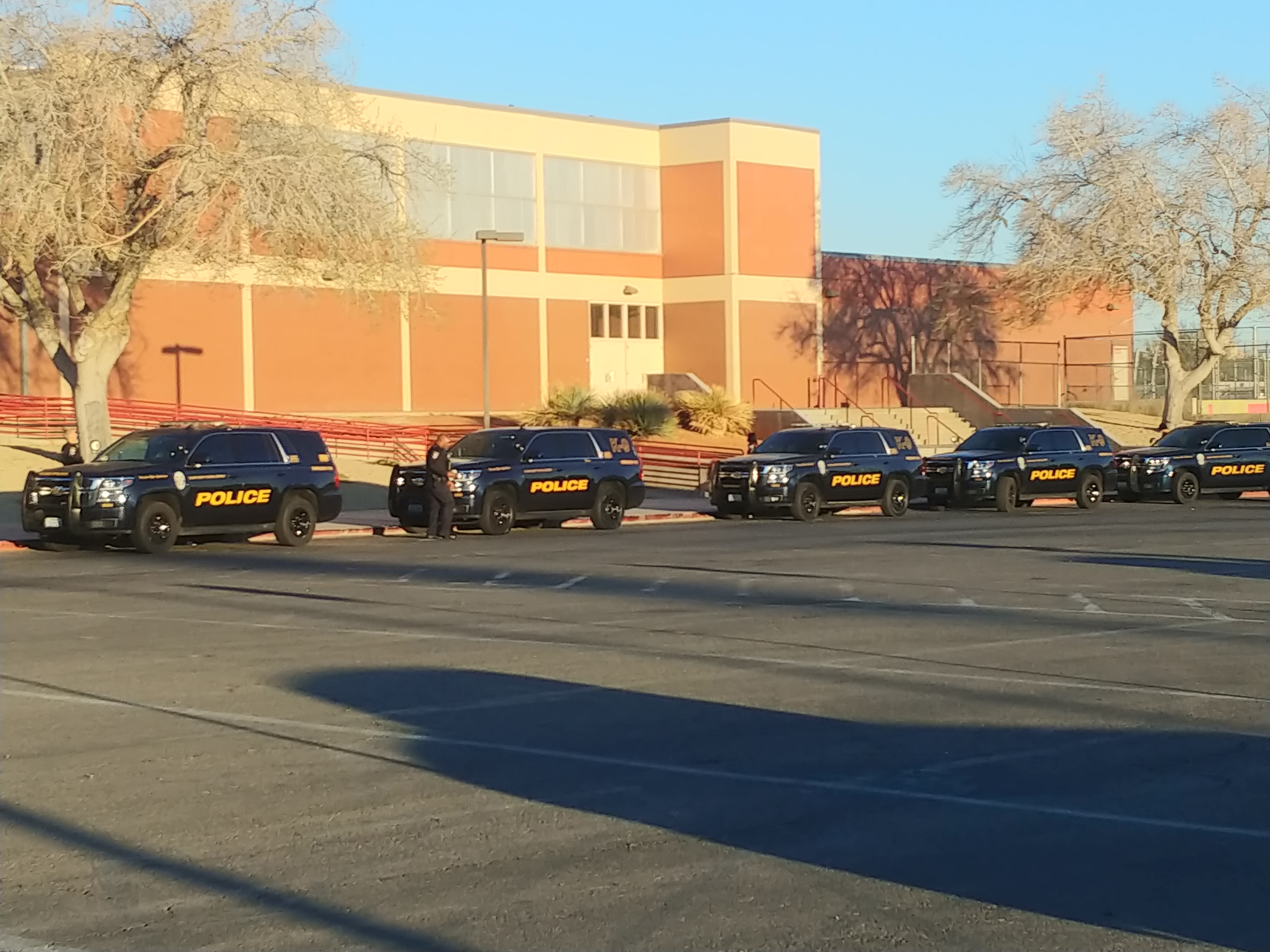
CCSD police patrol vehicles parked in the student parking lot of Valley High School in 2022.

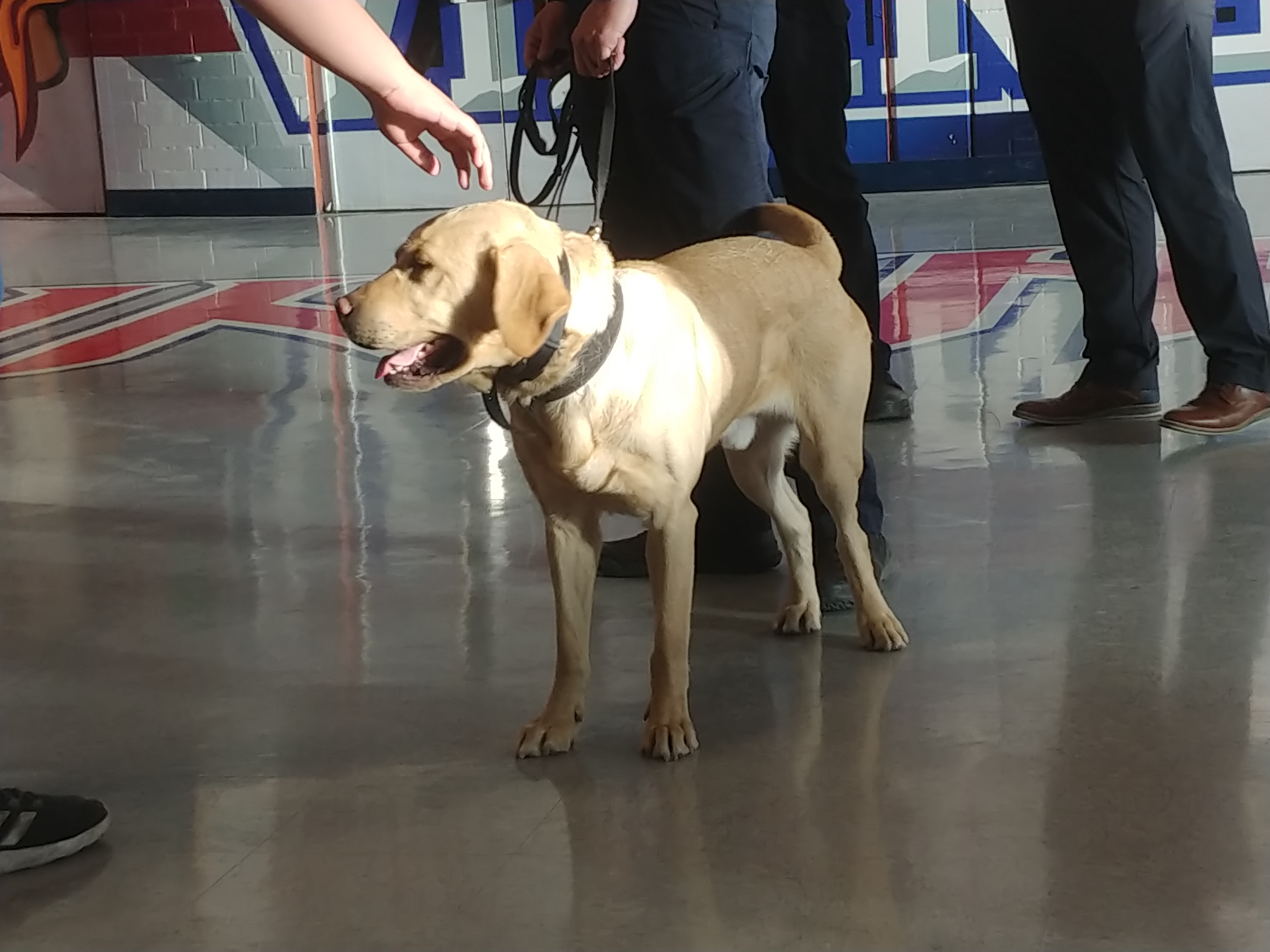
A CCSDPD police dog, a yellow labrador, in the cafeteria of Valley High School during lunchtime.

The district has its own police department with sworn peace officers with full powers of arrest. Officers are certified under Nevada's Peace Officer Standards and Training system and in addition to arrest, can issue both criminal and civil citations.

The department employs approximately 180 sworn officers and around 40 civilian personnel, organized into three area commands, with every high school having assigned officers and patrol units covering all elementary and middle schools across the district.

CCSDPD operates continuously, across three shifts, just as any other police department; specialized units include detectives, training, traffic (including a motorcycle unit), K-9, and communications (dispatch, records, and fingerprinting).

School security in the district originated in the late 1960s within the maintenance department, eventually becoming a fully empowered police force in 1989 following state legislative authorization.

== Transportation ==
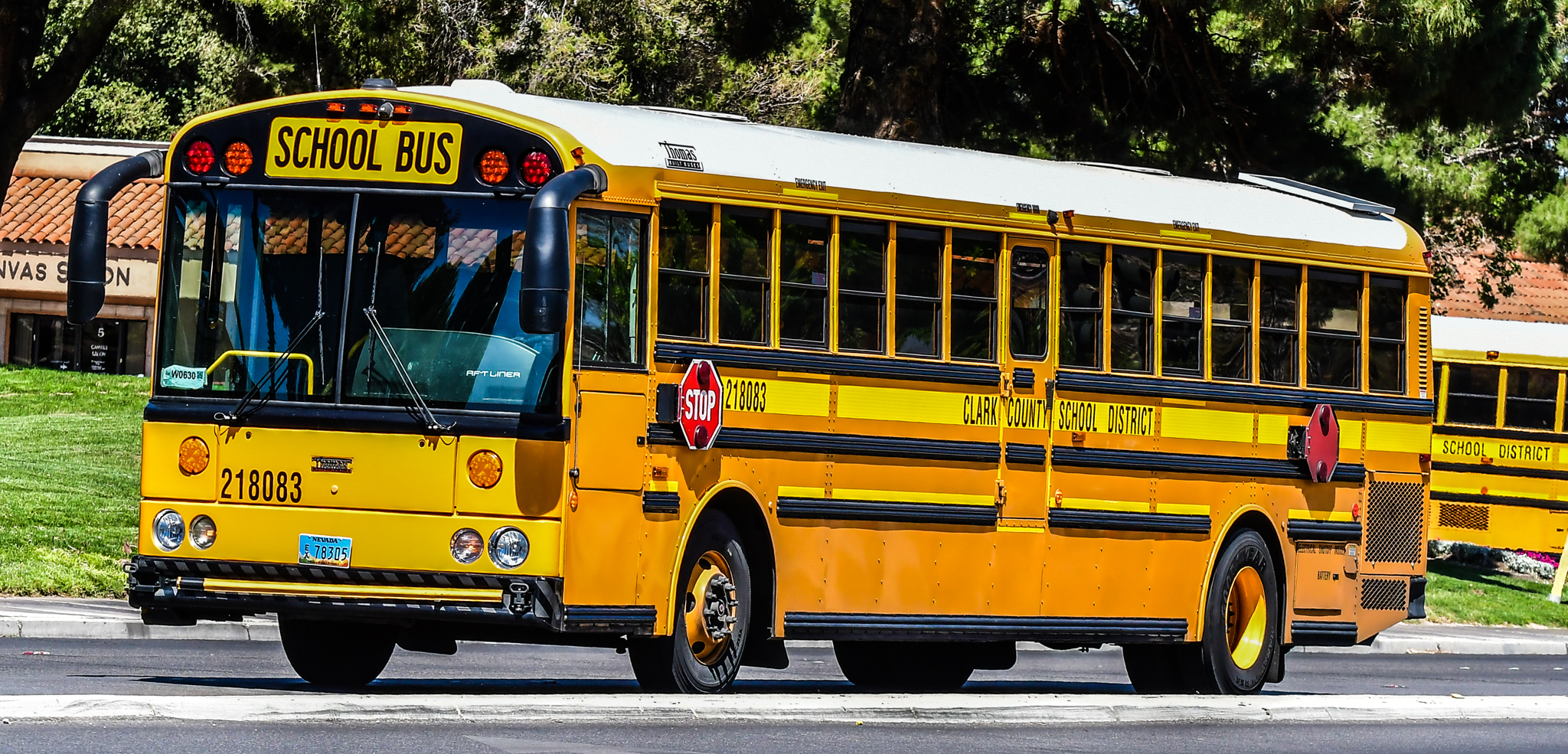
A CCSD bus pictured in 2025.

CCSD operates a fleet of more than 1,900 school busses, which students take to and from schools, athletic events, and other extracurricular activities across the entire county. During the 2022–2023 school year, CCSD buses travelled over 21,000,000 mi (34,000,000 km) due to Clark County's size—roughly equivalent to that of Massachusetts.

Bus service eligibility is generally available to students residing two or more miles from their assigned school. CCSD transportation operates a mobile application which families can use to check eligibility, view bus stop information, track buses, and receive alerts. Students who have an IEP may qualify for door-to-door bussing.

In 2022, the district began a partnership with the Regional Transportation Commission to grant free monthly ridership cards to high school students at Basic, Las Vegas, Bonanza, Legacy, Chaparral, Liberty, Cheyenne, Mojave, Cimarron-Memorial, Shadow Ridge, Clark, Sierra Vista, Del Sol, Spring Valley, Desert Oasis, Sunrise Mountain, Durango, Valley, Foothill, Western, and Green Valley.

In 2023, the district deployed its first all-electric school bus paid for through funds primarily from the Environmental Protection Agency and Nevada's equivalent environmental agency, in addition to funds from the public utility, NV Energy. As the nation's largest self-operated school bus fleet, the diesel buses contribute smog and other air pollution throughout the Las Vegas Valley. As of 2024, the district had committed to purchasing 25 all-electric buses, estimated to save about $60 per day in operating costs per bus.

A traffic safety bill went into effect in July 2025, allowing cameras to be affixed to school buses control arms, which extend into the street, as students are actively picked up and dropped off. Assembly Bill 527, passed by the legislature and signed by the governor, has the stated purpose of addressing the growing numbers of safety incidents and accidents around school bus pick up and drop offs. A pilot study of 30 busses from January to June 2025 captured over 11,000 violations, prompting CCSD and municipal leadership to express concern. Citations are not automatically issued and require review by a qualified law-enforcement officer. Violations caught through cameras are only enforced through civil infractions, rather than points or fines.

== Controversies ==
=== Data breaches ===
In August 2019, the district disclosed that software used for testing, made by Pearson, had experienced a data breach. Specifically, it involved AIMSweb, a special education diagnostic tool, affecting approximately 559,487 students enrolled between 2008 and 2019, plus a smaller number of staff. Names and, in some cases, dates of birth were reportedly exposed; no test scores or other sensitive data were disclosed. Pearson offered credit monitoring to affected individuals.

In October 2023, the district disclosed a cybersecurity incident affecting its email system, with unauthorized access to personal information belonging to some students, parents, and employees. Hackers claimed they had leaked as many as 200,000 student records, including names, photos, student identification numbers, and contact details, and threatened to release additional data unless paid. In response, the district, which uses Google for Education, restricted Google Workspace access to internal networks, forced password resets, and began notifying affected individuals. A judge later denied the district's motion to dismiss a class-action lawsuit stemming from the breach, finding that questions remained about cybersecurity practices and the timeline of disclosure.

=== Lawsuits and crime ===
In November 2023, 17-year-old Rancho High School student Jonathan Lewis was fatally beaten by a group of students. On April 9, 2025, his mother, Mellisa Ready, filed a wrongful death and negligence lawsuit against the district. The complaint alleged that the district failed to supervise students, implement preventive measures, or notify law enforcement, and that administrators were aware the assailants had a history of aggressive behavior. It also claimed school staff knew or should have known about prior conflicts involving Lewis. CCSD did not respond to the lawsuit. On July 10, 2025, the Board of Trustees voted 4–2 to approve the promotion of Rancho principal Darlin Delgado, who had been principal during the incident, to associate superintendent. The decision prompted criticism, and an investigative report aired in August 2025 on local ABC-affiliate KTNV, highlighting community concerns over her rehiring and promotion.

== See also ==
- List of Clark County School District schools
- List of the largest school districts in the United States by enrollment
- KLVX (Vegas PBS)
- Nevada Department of Education
