= Helen Herr =

American politician

Helen Herr (1907 – June 23, 1999) was an American politician and the first woman elected to the Nevada Senate. She advocated and fought for social reforms to protect the rights of women, children, and the elderly. Herr became the first and only woman senator inducted in the Nevada Senate Hall of Fame in May 1993. She is best known for her efforts in campaigning for legislations addressing social issues from seniors to children.

Born Helen Kolb on August 3, 1907 in Fargo, North Dakota to parents Conrad Kolb and Hilma Johnson, she later moved to Las Vegas after doctors recommendations for her to seek drier climate.

The Helen Herr Elementary School in Eagle Creek Lane, Las Vegas was named after her.

She died in her home in Victorville on June 23, 1999 due to heart failure at age 91.

== See also ==
- Maude Frazier
