= Derek Stockalper =

Derek Stockalper (born March 4, 1984) is a former professional and international basketball player.

== Early life ==
Stockalper graduated from Carlsbad High School, where he became a first-team All-San Diego County player.

== College career ==
After initially spending his freshman year at San Diego, Stockalper transferred to MiraCosta College for his sophomore year, before transferring to California Polytechnic State University at San Luis Obispo for his final two seasons. The 6-foot-5, 220-pound Stockalper starred as a forward at Cal Poly, where he earned All-Big West Conference First Team selections in 2006 and 2007, and in the latter season led the Big West in both field-goal percentage (shooting .540) and 3-point percentage (.496). He majored in history at Cal Poly.

In 2009, ESPN picked Stockalper as the best player in Cal Poly history.

== Pro career ==
Stockalper played for the Lugano Tigers from 2007 through 2018, and was selected as Swiss Basketball League MVP after leading the club to the championship in 2014.

== International career ==
Stockalper, originally from Vevey, played for the Switzerland National Team from 2007 to 2013. He made 23 career appearances for the Swiss in EuroBasket tournaments, averaging a career-best 12.7 points in 2011.
