= Donovan Fields =

American basketball player (born 1996)

Donovan Ceasar Fields (born January 11, 1996) is an American professional basketball player who plays for Sindri in the Iceland First Division.

== Early life ==
Fields graduated from Newburgh Free Academy in Newburgh, New York.

== College career ==
After playing for Odessa College, Fields signed a letter of intent with Cal Poly. He went on to become the first player in Mustangs history to score over 1,000 points and compile more than 300 assists and 100 steals as well.

== Pro basketball ==
As a rookie, Fields played with KK Radnicki Gorazde in Bosnia's A1 Liga. Fields was then an all-star selection in 2023 in the Irish Super League while with St. Vincent's Basketball Club, selected for third-team accolades.

Following a stint with Gence BK Ganja of the Azerbaijan League, on December 7, 2024, he had a 41-point game for Sindri, the second-highest tally around the world for the day.
