= Mike LaRoche =

Personal information
- Born: May 24, 1946 Ardmore, Oklahoma, United States
- Died: July 30, 2020 (aged 74) Granite Bay, California, United States
- Listed height: 6 ft 4 in (1.93 m)
- Listed weight: 200 lb (91 kg)

Career information
- High school: Fillmore High School
- College: Cal Poly
- ABA draft: 1968: Additional round
- Drafted by: Los Angeles Stars
- Playing career: 1968–1968
- Position: Shooting Guard
- Number: 14

Career history
- 1968–1969: Los Angeles Stars

Career highlights
- 3x All-CCAA (1966–68)

Mike LaRoche (May 24, 1946 – July 30, 2020) was an American professional basketball player in the American Basketball Association, rostered briefly in the 1968–69 season with the then-Los Angeles Stars.

== Early life ==
LaRoche attended Fillmore High School, and in 2010 was inducted into the school's inaugural Hall of Fame.

== College career ==
Playing for Cal Poly, LaRoche was the CCAA's leading scorer in 1966–67, and earned all-conference status three consecutive times.

Collegiate Statistics
| | GP | Total Rebounds | Reb. Avg. | Total Points | Scoring Avg. |
|---|---|---|---|---|---|
| 1965–66 | 24 | 127 | 5.3 | 445 | 18.5 |
| 1966–67 | 23 | 200 | 8.7 | 550 | 23.9 |
| 1967–68 | 23 | 178 | 7.7 | 505 | 21.9 |
| Career | 70 | 505 | 7.2 | 1,500 | 21.4 |

== Professional basketball ==
Los Angeles selected LaRoche with a pick in the additional rounds of the 1968 ABA Draft. Standing 6-foot-4, 200 pounds, LaRoche signed with the Stars in June 1968, for $12,000 with a signing bonus of $3,000, after scoring eight points each in two summer intrasquad games at the L.A. Sports Arena. Of the signing, L.A. coach Bill Sharman commented: "LaRoche showed us a lot during our rookie summer camp. He is a fine shooter, very aggressive and an excellent defensive player."

He was assigned uniform number 14, and netted 14, 26 and then 10 points in a trio of the club's preseason scrimmages.

While then rostered for the Stars' first two regular-season games, LaRoche did not see any floor time during either of the two games, and thereafter was released.

After basketball, he went on to a lengthy law career.
