= Lyle Sendlein =

American football player (born 1984)

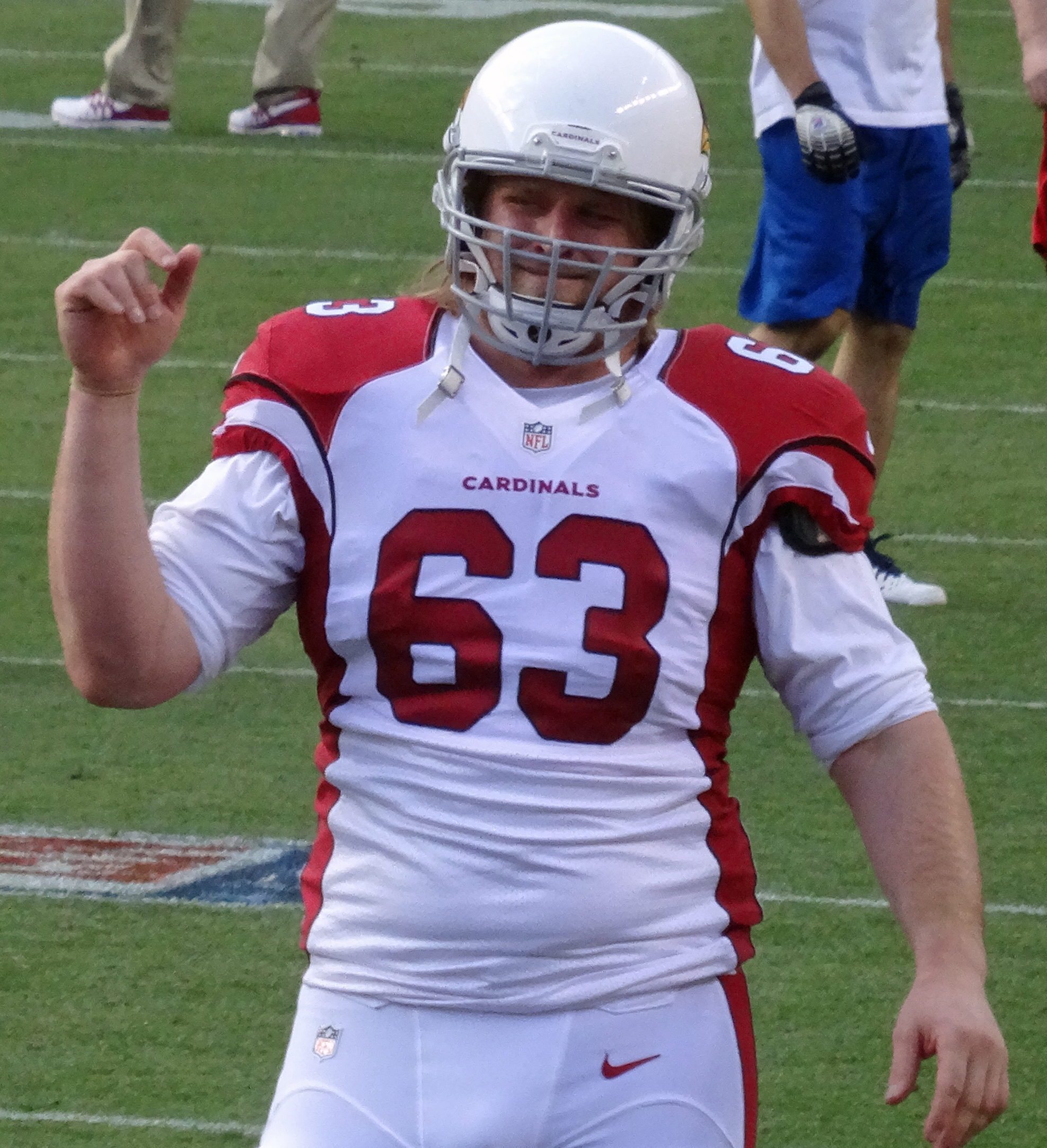
- Sendlein with the Arizona Cardinals in 2013

No. 63
- Position: Center

Personal information
- Born: March 16, 1984 (age 42); Edina, Minnesota, U.S.
- Listed height: 6 ft 3 in (1.91 m)
- Listed weight: 308 lb (140 kg)

Career information
- High school: Chaparral (Scottsdale, Arizona)
- College: Texas (2002–2006)
- NFL draft: 2007: undrafted

Career history
- Arizona Cardinals (2007–2015)

Awards and highlights
- BCS national champion (2005); First-team All-Big 12 (2006)

Career NFL statistics
- Games played: 136
- Games started: 124
- Stats at Pro Football Reference

Lyle Mark Sendlein (born March 16, 1984) is an American former professional football player who was a center in the National Football League (NFL). He played college football for the Texas Longhorns, where he won the BCS national championship, and nine years in the NFL for the Arizona Cardinals, with whom he played in Super Bowl XLIII.

== Early life ==
Coached by Ron Estabrook at Chaparral High School in Scottsdale, Arizona, Sendlein was a four-year letter winner and three-year starter as a prepster. He started varsity football early and became a first-team all-region choice at offensive tackle as a sophomore. He started at defensive tackle and linebacker as a senior, linebacker as a junior and offensive tackle as a sophomore. Sendlein also helped lead team to back-to-back Arizona 4A State Championships in 1999–2000 and a 28-game winning streak. He became a first-team all-state, all-region and all-city selection as a senior he posted 110 tackles, six sacks, three fumble recoveries (one returned for a TD) and a 29-yard interception return for a TD that year, he also had 21 tackles, two sacks and a 29-yard INT return for a TD against rival Saguaro in 2001. He earned second-team all-state and first-team all-region and all-city honors as a junior. Sendlein was also named the Valley's 2000 Defensive Player of the Year. He racked up 157 tackles that year, his top game of his junior season was a 19-tackle performance against the Saguaro Sabrecats.

== College career ==
Sendlein played in 50 games while at Texas and he started in his final 26 games. He was a two-time all-conference performer as center in the Big 12. He started for the 2005 National Championship team and helped the Longhorns set an NCAA single-season record with 652 total points scored and a UT single-season record with 6,657 total offensive yards.

He earned a degree in liberal arts in December 2006.

== Professional career ==
Pre-draft measurables
Height	Weight	40-yard dash	10-yard split	20-yard split	Vertical jump
6 ft 4 3/8 in (1.94 m)	285 lb (129 kg)	5.24 s	1.76 s	2.97 s	32.0 in (0.81 m)
All values from Pro Day

Sendlein went undrafted in the 2007 NFL draft, but signed with the Arizona Cardinals as an undrafted free agent shortly after the draft. On his signing with the Cardinals, Sendlein said, "I had about 20 to 25 teams call to check on my status, but my agent and I felt like Arizona would be a good fit." It was a homecoming for Sendlein since he played for Scottsdale Chaparral.

Sendlein started only two games as a rookie in 2007, but he became the starting center for Arizona in his second year, and maintained that position throughout most of his career. It was also in his second year that he helped the Cardinals make it to Super Bowl XLIII, which the Cardinals lost to the Pittsburgh Steelers 27-23.

Following the 2010 season, he was not re-signed by the Cardinals until July.

During the 2012 season he suffered an injury and missed the last six games of the season.

On March 12, 2015, Sendlein was released, but he re-signed with the team on August 7, 2015.

After the 2015 season, his contract expired and he was not resigned.

== Personal life ==
Sendlein, who is of German descent, is the son of former NFL player Robin Sendlein and Carrie Sendlein.

After football, he became a real estate investor.
