= Ben Larson =

American basketball player

Personal information
- Born: c. 1978
- Listed height: 6 ft 0 in (1.83 m)

Career information
- High school: Elkhart Central (Elkhart, Indiana)
- College: Cal Poly (1995–1999)
- NBA draft: 1999: undrafted
- Position: Point guard

Career highlights
- American West Player of the Year (1996); American West Freshman of the Year (1996)

Ben Larson (born c. 1978) is an American former college basketball player. A native of Elkhart, Indiana, Larson played NCAA Division I basketball at California Polytechnic State University, San Luis Obispo (Cal Poly) from 1995 to 1999, where, as a true freshman, he was named the American West Conference Player of the Year. The 1995–96 season saw him average career highs of 12.8 points, 5.2 assists, 3.4 steals, and 2.7 rebounds per game. He led the American West in assists and steals per game in guiding the Mustangs to win the regular season championship. Despite being named as the league's player and freshman of the year, Larson was not named to an all-conference squad.

After Larson's freshman season, the American West Conference disbanded. Cal Poly joined the Big West Conference. In each of his final three seasons, Larson declined his scoring averages down to 11.0, 7.2, and 5.0 points, respectively. He did not attain the same overall impact he did in his freshman year and then went unselected in the 1999 NBA draft. Larson never played professional basketball.

== College statistics ==
Legend
GP	Games played	GS	Games started	MPG	Minutes per game
FG%	Field goal percentage	3P%	3-point field goal percentage	FT%	Free throw percentage
RPG	Rebounds per game	APG	Assists per game	SPG	Steals per game
BPG	Blocks per game	PPG	Points per game	**Bold**	Career high

Year	Team	GP	GS	MPG	FG%	3P%	FT%	RPG	APG	SPG	BPG	PPG
1995–96	Cal Poly	29	29	36.3	.379	**.382**	.709	**2.7**	**5.2**	**3.4**	0.1	**12.8**
1996–97	Cal Poly	**30**		30.2	**.395**	.333	**.870**	**2.7**	3.5	2.3	**0.3**	11.0
1997–98	Cal Poly	26		31.5	.360	.333	.726	**2.7**	4.9	2.1	**0.3**	7.2
1998–99	Cal Poly	22			.353	.321	.650	2.0	4.5	2.3	0.0	5.0
Career		107			.377	.351	.761	2.6	4.5	2.6	0.2	9.4

== See also ==
- Sean (Allen) McCaw – the only other American West Conference Player of the Year (1995)
