= Robin Sendlein =

American football player (born 1958)

No. 57, 52
- Position: Linebacker

Personal information
- Born: December 1, 1958 (age 67); Las Vegas, Nevada, U.S.
- Listed height: 6 ft 3 in (1.91 m)
- Listed weight: 225 lb (102 kg)

Career information
- High school: Western (Las Vegas)
- College: Texas
- NFL draft: 1981: 2nd round, 45th overall pick

Career history
- Minnesota Vikings (1981–1984); Miami Dolphins (1985–1987)

Career NFL statistics
- Sacks: 1
- Fumble recoveries: 1
- Stats at Pro Football Reference

Robin Sendlein (born December 1, 1958) is an American former professional football player who was a linebacker in the National Football League (NFL). Sendlein was selected in the second round by the Minnesota Vikings out of the University of Texas at Austin in the 1981 NFL draft. His son, Lyle Sendlein, also played football for the Longhorns and followed in his father's footsteps to the NFL where he was part of the Arizona Cardinals. Robin joined the Phoenix Fire Department in January 1997, promoting to the rank of Engineer. He recently retired out of Phoenix Fire Station 1, and now resides in Texas.
