= Cal Poly Mustangs men's basketball =

Men's college basketball team

Cal Poly Mustangs
2026–27 Cal Poly Mustangs men's basketball team
- University: California Polytechnic State University
- Head coach: Mike DeGeorge (3rd season)
- Location: San Luis Obispo, California
- Arena: Mott Athletics Center (capacity: 3,032)
- Conference: Big West
- Nickname: Mustangs
- Colors: Poly green, copper gold, and stadium gold

NCAA Division I tournament Final Four
- 1981*
Other NCAA Division I tournament results
Elite Eight	1977*, 1981*
Sweet Sixteen	1977*, 1980*, 1981*, 1982*
Appearances	1971*, 1974*, 1977*, 1980*, 1981*, 1982*, 1986*, 2014

Conference tournament champions
- Big West: 2014

Conference regular-season champions
- CCAA: 1955, 1956, 1972, 1974, 1977, 1980, 1981 (co), 1986, 1987 (co); American West: 1996

Uniforms
Home	Away	Alternate
- * at Division II level

The Cal Poly Mustangs men's basketball team represents California Polytechnic State University, located in San Luis Obispo, California. The school's team currently competes in the Big West Conference. The Cal Poly men's basketball team's first season was 1907 and its first season as a four-year institution was 1941–42. The Mustangs are coached by Mike DeGeorge and play their home games at Robert A. Mott Athletics Center.

== History ==
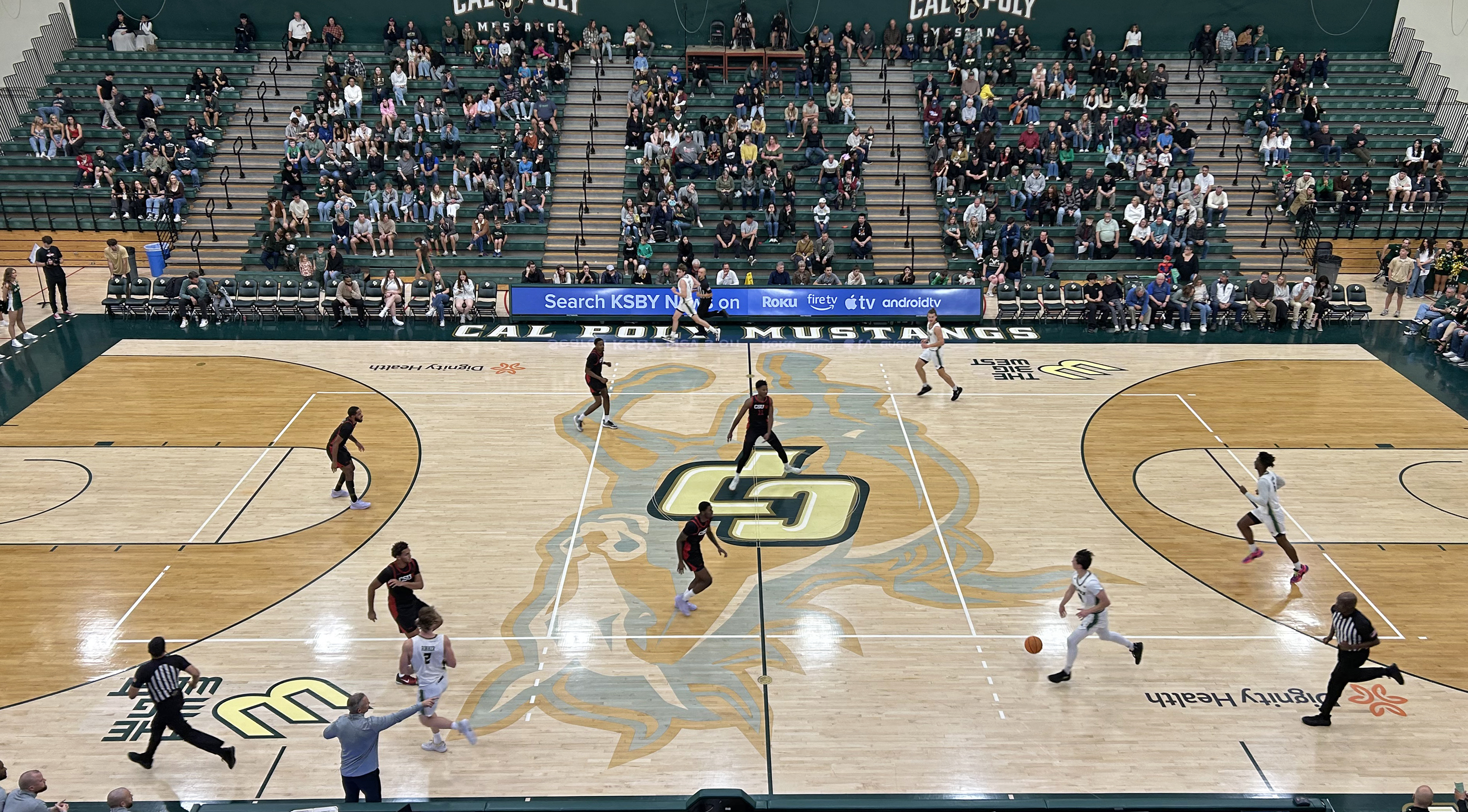
Cal Poly's men's basketball team faces CSUN in Mott Athletics Center on Dec. 7, 2024.

The team began playing at the Division I level in 1994–95, and shortly thereafter won a regular-season conference title in the four-team American West Conference (since disbanded) with a 5–1 record in 1996. The 1995–96 championship season saw Cal Poly's Ben Larson average 3.45 steals per game, the third-most in NCAA history, while winning the AWC Player of the Year award. The Mustangs then joined the Big West ahead of the 1996–97 school year.

In 2009, ESPN selected Ernie Wheeler (1972–86) as the top coach in school history, along with Derek Stockalper as the best player in program history (joined by Jim Schultz, Mike Wozniak, Mike LaRoche and Varnie Dennis as the network's then-all time starting five). Wozniak became the all-time scoring leader in school history. Just a year later, however, Chris Bjorklund broke Wozniak's career program record of 1,903 points, graduating in 2001 after scoring a still-standing total of 2,006.

Cal Poly advanced to its first Division I NCAA Tournament in 2014 after a historic run in the Big West Conference tournament, becoming the first 7th seed to win the championship, as the Mustangs defeated CSUN, 61–59, following a go-ahead 3-pointer made by Ridge Shipley at the Honda Center. Cal Poly earned the 16th seed and defeated Texas Southern in the NCAA first round in Dayton. Cal Poly then advanced to the 2nd Round, where they were defeated by unbeaten top seed Wichita State 64–37.

Prior to the 2014 conference tournament championship-game victory, Cal Poly advanced to the Big West Championship Game on two other occasions: in 2003 (falling to Utah State) and 2007 (to Long Beach State).

== The Blue-Green rivalry ==
The main rival of the Cal Poly Mustangs men's basketball team is the UC Santa Barbara Gauchos men's basketball team. The rivalry is a part of the larger Blue–Green Rivalry, which encompasses all sports from the two schools.

== Postseason ==
=== NCAA Division I Tournament results ===
The Mustangs have appeared in one NCAA tournament. Their record is 1–1.

Year	Seed	Round	Opponent	Result
2014	#16	First Four; Second Round	#16 Texas Southern #1 Wichita State	W 81–69; L 37–64

=== NCAA Division II Tournament results ===
The Mustangs appeared in the NCAA Division II tournament seven times. Their combined record was 10–8, with the deepest run forged by the 1981 squad which advanced to the Final Four in Springfield, Mass.

Year	Round	Opponent	Result
1971	Regional semifinals Regional 3rd-place game	Puget Sound; San Francisco State	L 69–81; W 70–68
1974	Regional semifinals Regional 3rd-place game	Sonoma State; Cal State Chico	L 66–73; W 81–63
1977	Regional semifinals Regional Finals; Elite Eight	Seattle Pacific; Puget Sound; North Alabama	W 73–58; W 67–54; L 64–67 ^{OT}
1980	Regional semifinals Regional Finals	San Francisco State; UC Riverside	W 66–46; L 53–62
1981	Regional semifinals Regional Finals; Elite Eight; Final Four; National 3rd-place game	Bloomsberg; Clarion; New Hampshire College; Florida Southern; Green Bay	W 71–43; W 84–61; W 77–73; L 51–54; W 62–61 ^{2OT}
1982	Regional semifinals Regional Finals	Alaska–Anchorage; Cal State Bakersfield	W 66–60; L 55–58
1986	Regional semifinals Regional 3rd-place game	Cal State East Bay; UC Riverside	L 65–67; L 53–55

=== CIT results ===
The Mustangs have appeared in one CollegeInsider.com Postseason Tournament (CIT). Their record is 0–1.

Year	Round	Opponent	Result
2013	First round	Weber state	L 43–85

== Season-by-season results ==
Record table
Season	Coach	Overall	Conference	Standing	Postseason
Unknown (Independent) (1921–1941)
1921–22	Unknown	4–1			
1922–23	No Team				
1923–24	Unknown	2–3			
1924–25	Unknown	4–2			
1925–26	Unknown	1–5			
1926–27	Unknown	3–9			
1927–28	Unknown	6–11			
1928–29	No Team				
1929–30	No Team				
1930–31	No Team				
1931–32	No Team				
1932–33	Unknown	15–3			
1933–34	Unknown	4–6			
1934–35	Unknown	3–7			
1935–36	Unknown	7–5			
1936–37	Unknown	5–7			
1937–38	No Team				
1938–39	Unknown	8–8			
1939–40	Unknown	7–8			
1940–41	Unknown	6–13			
Unknown:		75–88			
Howie O'Daniels (Independent) (1941–1942)
1941–42	Howie O'Daniels	5–17			
O'Daniels:		5–17			
1942–43	No Team (WWII)				
1943–44	No team (WWII)				
1944–45	No team (WWII)				
1945–46	No team (WWII)				
Robert Mott (California Collegiate Athletic Association) (1946–1947)
1946–47	Robert Mott	4–14	0–10	6	
Mott:		4–14			
Ed Jorgensen (California Collegiate Athletic Association/Independent) (1947–1966)
1947–48	Ed Jorgensen	12–13	1–9	6	
1948–49	Ed Jorgensen	12–12	2–8	6	
1949–50	Ed Jorgensen	13–15	3–6	4	
1950–51	Ed Jorgensen	22–9	6–4	3	
1951–52	Ed Jorgensen	14–16	6–3	2	
1952–53	Ed Jorgensen	21–6	6–4	3	
1953–54	Ed Jorgensen	11–11	4–6	4	
1954–55	Ed Jorgensen	13–13	5–3	1	
1955–56	Ed Jorgensen	15–12	4–4	1	
1956–57	Ed Jorgensen	12–11			
1957–58	Ed Jorgensen	8–17			
1958–59	Ed Jorgensen	16–9			
1959–60	Ed Jorgensen	15–9			
1960–61	Ed Jorgensen	13–10	5–5	4	
1961–62	Ed Jorgensen	16–6	6–5	4	
1962–63	Ed Jorgensen	11–13	4–8	5	
1963–64	Ed Jorgensen	4–14	1–9	6	
1964–65	Ed Jorgensen	8–17	1–9	6	
1965–66	Ed Jorgensen	8–16	3–7	5	
Jorgensen:		222–229			
Stuart Chestnut (California Collegiate Athletic Association) (1966–1969)
1966–67	Stuart Chestnut	12–11	4–7	5	
1967–68	Stuart Chestnut	10–12	5–9	5	
1968–69	Stuart Chestnut	7–19	4–8	6	
Chestnut:		29–42			
Neale Stoner (California Collegiate Athletic Association) (1969–1972)
1969–70	Neale Stoner	13–13	2–6	5	
1970–71	Neale Stoner	17–11	6–2	2	College Division West Third Place
1971–72	Neale Stoner	17–9	5–3	1T	
Stoner:		47–33			
Ernie Wheeler (California Collegiate Athletic Association) (1972–1986)
1972–73	Ernie Wheeler	13–13	4–5	4	
1973–74	Ernie Wheeler	18–10	8–2	1	NCAA D-II West Third Place
1974–75	Ernie Wheeler	15–11	2–6	5	
1975–76	Ernie Wheeler	14–14	2–8	6	
1976–77	Ernie Wheeler	18–10	7–3	1	NCAA D-II Elite Eight
1977–78	Ernie Wheeler	17–10	7–3	2	
1978–79	Ernie Wheeler	13–14	3–9	6	
1979–80	Ernie Wheeler	22–7	9–3	1	NCAA D-II West Second Place
1980–81	Ernie Wheeler	24–8	10–3	1T	NCAA D-II Final Four
1981–82	Ernie Wheeler	20–6	10–4	2	NCAA D-II West Second Place
1982–83	Ernie Wheeler	21–10	8–6	4	
1983–84	Ernie Wheeler	20–8	8–6	4	
1984–85	Ernie Wheeler	16–11	5–9	6	
1985–86	Ernie Wheeler	23–6	12–2	1	NCAA D-II West Fourth Place
Wheeler:		254–124			
Steve Beason (California Collegiate Athletic Association/American West Conference) (1986–1995)
1986–87	Steve Beason	19–10	10–4	1T	
1987–88	Steve Beason	17–10	9–5	3	
1988–89	Steve Beason	14–12	6–8	6	
1989–90	Steve Beason	19–9	9–5	3	
1990–91	Steve Beason	14–14	6–6	4	
1991–92	Steve Beason	19–8	7–7	5T	
1992–93	Steve Beason	9–17	3–11	8	
1993–94	Steve Beason	9–16	3–9	7	
1994–95	Steve Beason	1–26	0–6	4	
Beason:		393–167			
Jeff Schneider (American West Conference/Big West Conference) (1995–2001)
1995–96	Jeff Schneider	16–13	5–1	1	
1996–97	Jeff Schneider	14–16	7–10	5 (West)	
1997–98	Jeff Schneider	14–14	7–9	2 (West)	
1998–99	Jeff Schneider	11–16	6–10	5 (West)	
1999–00	Jeff Schneider	10–18	5–11	5 (West)	
2000–01	Jeff Schneider	9–19	3–13	8	
Schneider:		74–96			
Kevin Bromley (Big West Conference) (2001–2009)
2001–02	Kevin Bromley	15–12	9–9	6T	
2002–03	Kevin Bromley	16–14	10–8	4	
2003–04	Kevin Bromley	11–16	6–12	8	
2004–05	Kevin Bromley	5–22	3–15	10	
2005–06	Kevin Bromley	10–19	7–7	3	
2006–07	Kevin Bromley	19–11	9–5	2T	
2007–08	Kevin Bromley	12–18	7–9	6	
2008–09	Kevin Bromley	7–21	3–13	9	
Bromley:		95–133			
Joe Callero (Big West Conference) (2009–2019)
2009–10	Joe Callero	12–19	7–9	6	
2010–11	Joe Callero	15–15	10–6	2	
2011–12	Joe Callero	18–15	8–8	4	
2012–13	Joe Callero	18–14	12–6	3	CIT First Round
2013–14	Joe Callero	14–20	6–10	7	NCAA Tournament Second Round
2014–15	Joe Callero	13–16	6–10	6	
2015–16	Joe Callero	10–20	4–12	7	
2016–17	Joe Callero	11–20	6–10	7	
2017–18	Joe Callero	9–21	4–12	8	
2018–19	Joe Callero	6–23	2–14	9	
Callero:		126–183			
John Smith (Big West Conference) (2019–2024)
2019–20	John Smith	7–23	4–12	9	
2020–21	John Smith	4–20	1–15	10	
2021–22	John Smith	7–21	3–12	10	
2022–23	John Smith	8–25	1–18	11	
2023–24	John Smith	4–28	0–20	11	
Smith:		30–117			
Mike DeGeorge (Big West Conference) (2024–present)
2024-25	Mike DeGeorge	16-19	8-12	7	
DeGeorge:		16-19			
Total:		356–614			
National champion Postseason invitational champion Conference regular season champion Conference regular season and conference tournament champion Division regular season champion Division regular season and conference tournament champion Conference tournament champion

== NBA players ==
- In 2017, David Nwaba became the first Cal Poly alum to play in the NBA, making his debut for the Los Angeles Lakers, his hometown team. Nwaba, who made the 2016–17 G-League All-Defensive Team, has also played for the Chicago Bulls, Cleveland Cavaliers, Brooklyn Nets and Houston Rockets. While with Cal Poly, Nwaba was selected to the 2014 Big West All-Tournament Team, and was voted as the conference's Player of the Week on December 22, 2014.

== NBA Draft picks ==
Year	Round	Overall	Team	Player
1978	10	199	PHX	Lewis Cohen
2025	2	50	LAC (via NYK)	Kobe Sanders

== Other notable pro alumni ==
- Sean Chambers, Philippines Aces
- Chris Eversley, Westports Malaysia Dragons
- Donovan Fields, Irish Super League
- Mike LaRoche, Los Angeles Stars
- Derek Stockalper, Lugano Tigers
- Drake U'u, Perth Wildcats

== Gallery ==
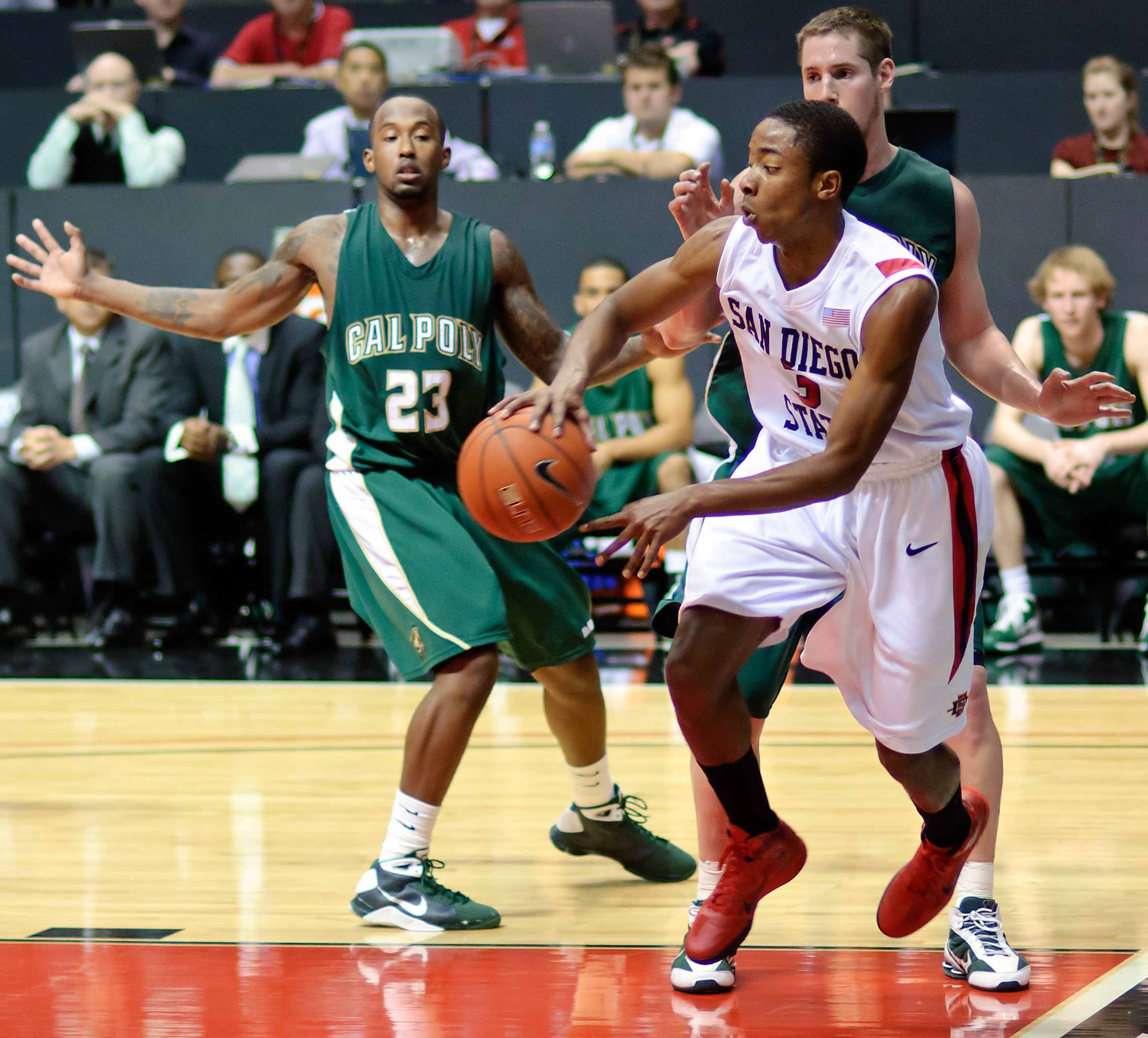
Cal Poly's Shawn Lewis (23) defends against San Diego State during a 51–45 loss to the 10th-ranked Aztecs in December 2010.

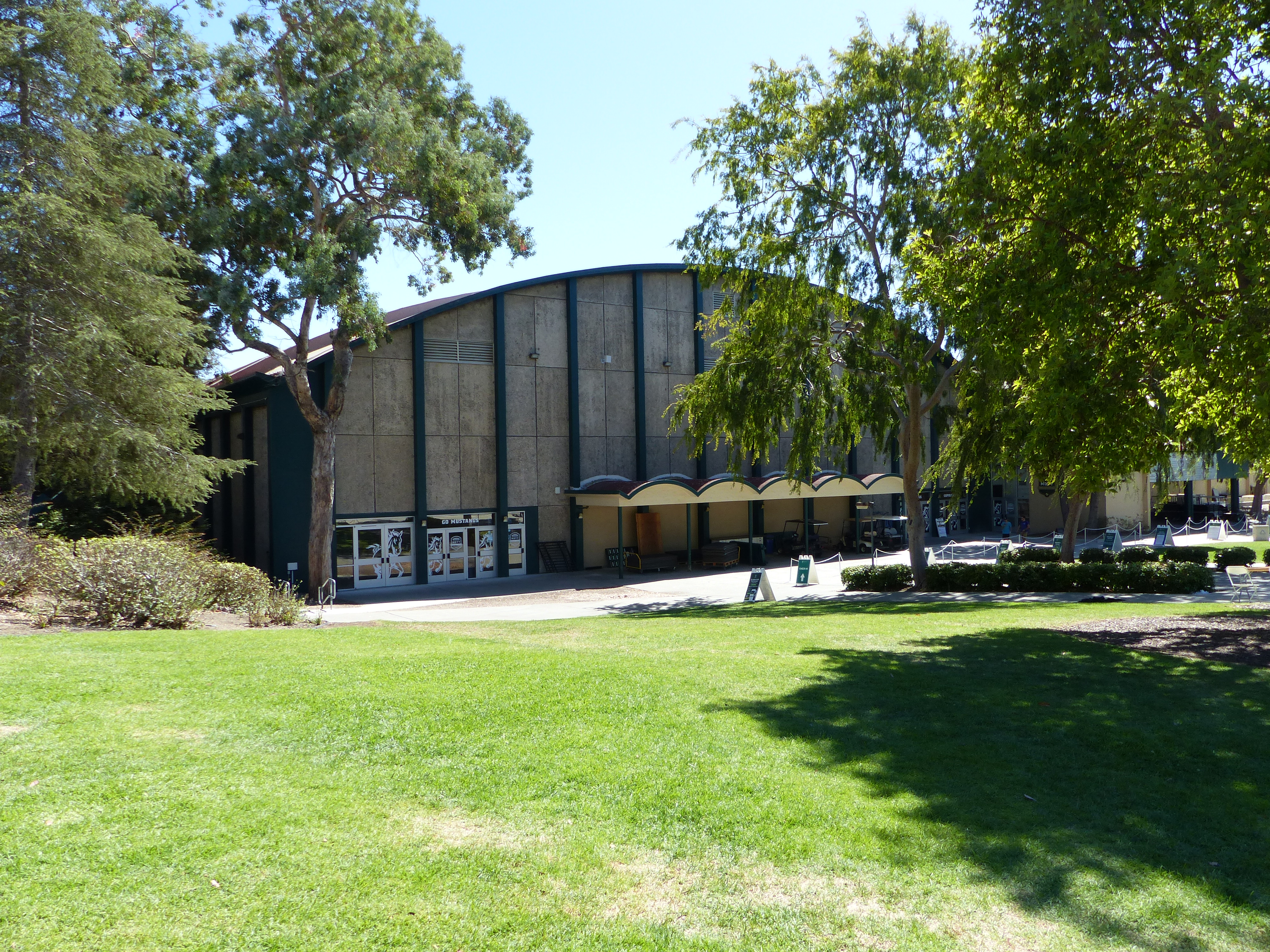
Cal Poly's home basketball arena, Mott Athletics Center, is pictured in September 2018.

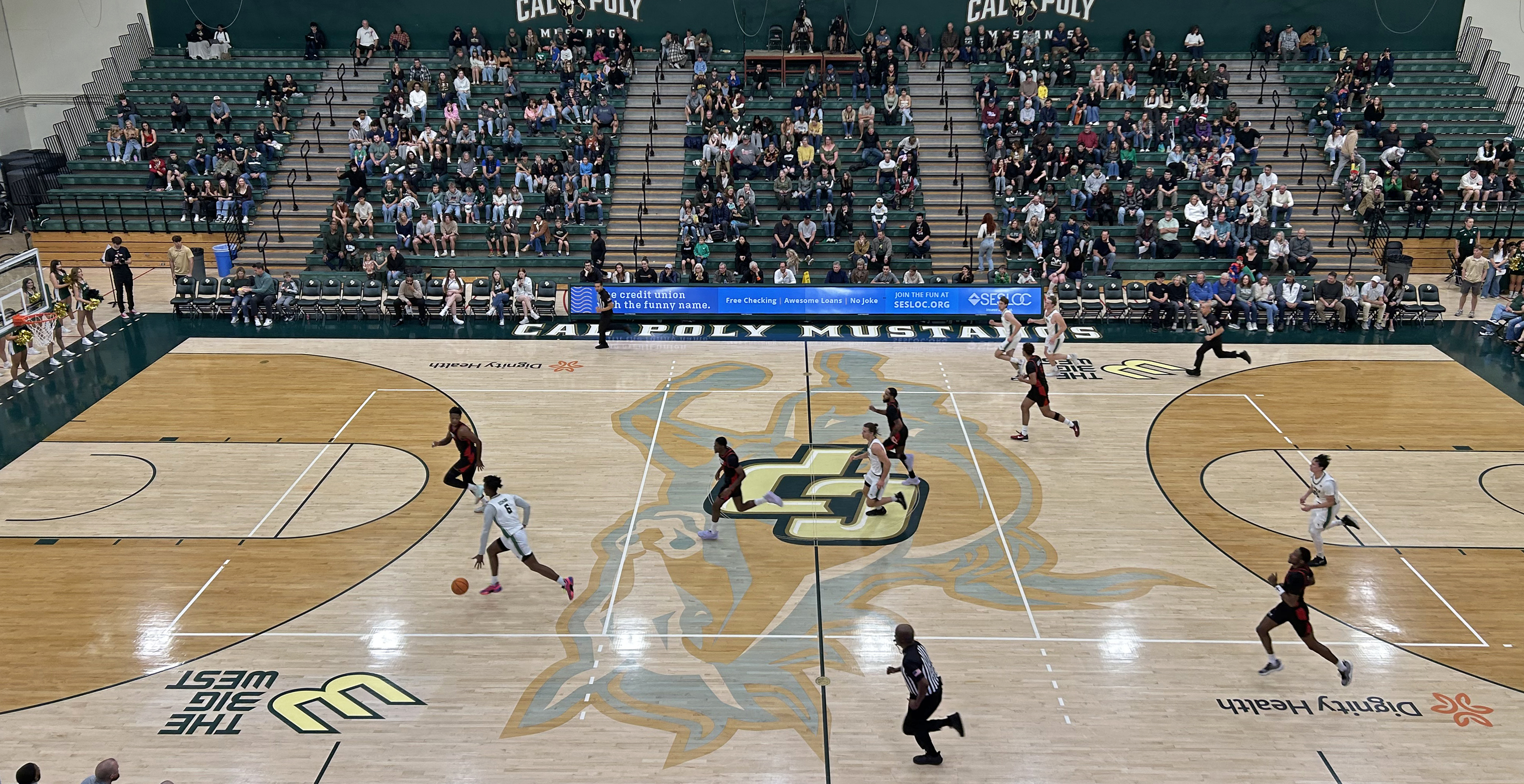
Mott Athletics Center serves as the host arena for a 2024 men's basketball game between Cal Poly and CSUN.
