= Las Vegas Grammar School =

Las Vegas Grammar School may refer to:

- Las Vegas Grammar School (Las Vegas Boulevard, Las Vegas, Nevada)
- Las Vegas Grammar School (Washington and D Streets, Las Vegas, Nevada)
