= 1994 NFL draft =

National Football League draft

General information
- Date: April 24–25, 1994
- Location: Marriott Marquis in New York City, New York
- Network: ESPN

Overview
- 222 total selections in 7 rounds
- League: National Football League
- First selection: Dan Wilkinson, DT; Cincinnati Bengals
- Mr. Irrelevant: Marty Moore, LB; New England Patriots
- Most selections (11): Buffalo Bills
- Fewest selections (5): Denver Broncos; Seattle Seahawks
- Hall of Famers: 6: RB Marshall Faulk; DT Bryant Young; WR Isaac Bruce; C Kevin Mawae; G Larry Allen; QB Kurt Warner

The 1994 NFL draft was the procedure by which National Football League teams selected amateur college football players. It is officially known as the NFL Annual Player Selection Meeting. The draft was held April 24–25, 1994, at the Marriott Marquis in New York City, New York. This was the first draft in which the rounds were reduced to seven in total. The league also held a supplemental draft after the regular draft and before the regular season.

This draft is known for a verbal altercation between ESPN analyst Mel Kiper, Jr. and Indianapolis Colts general manager Bill Tobin over Tobin's handling of the Colts' two first round picks. Kiper believed the Colts needed a quarterback in the first round, but Tobin, who signed free agent quarterback Jim Harbaugh ahead of the draft, instead selected running back Marshall Faulk and linebacker Trev Alberts. After Kiper disputed the Colts taking Alberts over quarterback Trent Dilfer, Tobin responded by criticizing Kiper's credentials. Faulk would become a Hall of Fame inductee, while Alberts' career only lasted three seasons, and Dilfer became regarded as a journeyman. The Colts would reach the 1995 AFC Championship Game with Harbaugh, but fell to 3–13 in 1997, which led to the firing of Tobin and the drafting of future Hall of Fame inductee Peyton Manning the following year.

== Player selections ==
*	Compensatory selection
†	Pro Bowler
‡	Hall of Famer

Positions key
Offense	Defense	Special teams
QB — Quarterback; RB — Running back; FB — Fullback; WR — Wide receiver; TE — Tight end; OL — Offensive lineman; T — Tackle; G — Guard; C — Center	DL — Defensive lineman; DT — Defensive tackle (Note: Includes nose tackle (NT)); DE — Defensive end; EDGE — Edge rusher; LB — Linebacker (Note: Includes middle linebacker (MLB/MIKE), weakside linebacker (WILL), strongside linebacker (SAM), off-ball linebacker, and outside linebacker (OLB)); DB — Defensive back; CB — Cornerback; S — Safety (Note: Includes free safety (FS) and strong safety (SS))	K — Kicker (Note: Also known as a placekicker (PK)); P — Punter; LS — Long snapper; RS — Return specialist (Note: Includes kickoff and punt returners)

Rnd.	Pick	Team	Player	Pos.	College	Notes
1	1	Cincinnati Bengals	Dan Wilkinson	DT	Ohio State	
1	2	Indianapolis Colts	Marshall Faulk^{‡}^{†}	RB	San Diego State	
1	3	Washington Redskins	Heath Shuler	QB	Tennessee	
1	4	New England Patriots	Willie McGinest ^{†}	LB	USC	
1	5	Indianapolis Colts	Trev Alberts	LB	Nebraska	from LA Rams (Note: No. 5: LA Rams → Indianapolis (D). LA Rams traded a first-round selection (5th overall) to Indianapolis in exchange for first- and third-round selections (7th and 83rd overall).)
1	6	Tampa Bay Buccaneers	Trent Dilfer ^{†}	QB	Fresno State	
1	7	San Francisco 49ers	Bryant Young^{‡}^{†}	DT	Notre Dame	from Atlanta via Indianapolis and LA Rams (Note: No. 7: Atlanta → Indianapolis → LA Rams → San Francisco. Multiple trades: Atlanta → Indianapolis (PD). Atlanta traded first- and third-round selections (7th and 83rd overall) and a 1996 first-round selection to Indianapolis in exchange for QB Jeff George. Indianapolis → LA Rams (D). See Round 1: LA Rams → Indianapolis. LA Rams → San Francisco (D). The LA Rams traded a first-round selection (7th overall) to San Francisco in exchange for first-, second- and third-round selections (15th, 56th and 100th overall).)
1	8	Seattle Seahawks	Sam Adams ^{†}	DT	Texas A&M	
1	9	Cleveland Browns	Antonio Langham	CB	Alabama	
1	10	Arizona Cardinals	Jamir Miller ^{†}	LB	UCLA	
1	11	Chicago Bears	John Thierry	DE	Alcorn State	
1	12	New York Jets	Aaron Glenn ^{†}	CB	Texas A&M	from New Orleans (Note: No. 12: New Orleans → NY Jets (D). New Orleans traded a first-round selection (12th overall) to the NY Jets in exchange for first- and fifth-round selections (13th and 143rd overall).)
1	13	New Orleans Saints	Joe Johnson ^{†}	DE	Louisville	from NY Jets (Note: No. 13: NY Jets → New Orleans (D). See Round 1: New Orleans → NY Jets.)
1	14	Philadelphia Eagles	Bernard Williams	T	Georgia	
1	15	Los Angeles Rams	Wayne Gandy	T	Auburn	from San Diego via San Francisco (Note: No. 15: San Diego → San Francisco → LA Rams. Multiple trades: San Diego → San Francisco (PD). San Diego traded a first-round selection (15th overall) to San Francisco in exchange for a 1993 second-round selection. San Francisco → LA Rams (D). See Round 1: LA Rams → San Francisco.)
1	16	Green Bay Packers	Aaron Taylor	G	Notre Dame	from Miami (Note: No. 16: Miami → Green Bay (D). Miami traded a first-round selection (16th overall) to Green Bay in exchange for first- and third-round selections (20th and 89th overall).)
1	17	Pittsburgh Steelers	Charles Johnson	WR	Colorado	
1	18	Minnesota Vikings	Dewayne Washington	CB	NC State	from Denver (Note: No. 18: Denver → Minnesota (PD). Denver traded first- and sixth-round selections (18th and 179th overall), a 1995 second-round selection and WR Vance Johnson to Minnesota in exchange for OT Gary Zimmerman.)
1	19	Minnesota Vikings	Todd Steussie ^{†}	T	California	
1	20	Miami Dolphins	Tim Bowens ^{†}	DT	Ole Miss	from Green Bay (Note: No. 20: Green Bay → Miami (D). See Round 1: Green Bay → Miami.)
1	21	Detroit Lions	Johnnie Morton	WR	USC	
1	22	Los Angeles Raiders	Rob Fredrickson	LB	Michigan State	
1	23	Dallas Cowboys	Shante Carver	DE	Arizona State	from San Francisco (Note: No. 23: San Francisco → Dallas. San Francisco traded first- and seventh-round selections (23rd and 217th overall) to Dallas in exchange for first- and second-round selections (28th and 62nd overall).)
1	24	New York Giants	Thomas Lewis	WR	Indiana	
1	25	Kansas City Chiefs	Greg Hill	RB	Texas A&M	
1	26	Houston Oilers	Henry Ford	DE	Arkansas	
1	27	Buffalo Bills	Jeff Burris	CB	Notre Dame	
1	28	San Francisco 49ers	William Floyd	FB	Florida State	from Dallas (Note: No. 28: Dallas → San Francisco (D). See Round 1: San Francisco → Dallas.)
1*	29	Cleveland Browns	Derrick Alexander	WR	Michigan	from Philadelphia (Note: No. 29: Philadelphia → Cleveland. Philadelphia traded a first-round selection (29th overall) to Cleveland in exchange for a second-round selection (40th overall) and a 1995 second-round selection.)
2	30	Cincinnati Bengals	Darnay Scott	WR	San Diego State	
2	31	Washington Redskins	Tre' Johnson ^{†}	T	Temple	
2	32	Indianapolis Colts	Eric Mahlum	G	California	
2	33	Los Angeles Rams	Isaac Bruce^{‡}^{†}	WR	Memphis	
2	34	Tampa Bay Buccaneers	Errict Rhett	RB	Florida	
2	35	New England Patriots	Kevin Lee	WR	Alabama	
2	36	Seattle Seahawks	Kevin Mawae^{‡}^{†}	C	LSU	
2	37	Philadelphia Eagles	Bruce Walker	DT	UCLA	from Atlanta (Note: No. 37: Atlanta → Philadelphia (D). Atlanta traded a second-round selection (37th overall) to Philadelphia in exchange for second- and fourth-round selections (40th and 118th overall).)
2	38	Arizona Cardinals	Chuck Levy	RB	Arizona	
2	39	Chicago Bears	Marcus Spears	T	Northwestern State	
2	40	Minnesota Vikings	David Palmer	WR	Alabama	from Cleveland via Philadelphia and Atlanta (Note: No. 40: Cleveland → Philadelphia → Atlanta → Minnesota. Multiple trades: Cleveland → Philadelphia (D). See Round 1: Philadelphia → Cleveland. Philadelphia → Atlanta (D). See Round 2: Atlanta → Philadelphia. Atlanta → Minnesota (D). Atlanta traded a second-round selection (40th overall) and a 1995 first-round selection to Minnesota in exchange for a second-round selection (45th overall) and DE Chris Doleman.)
2	41	New York Jets	Ryan Yarborough	WR	Wyoming	
2	42	Philadelphia Eagles	Charlie Garner ^{†}	RB	Tennessee	
2	43	San Diego Chargers	Isaac Davis	G	Arkansas	
2	44	New Orleans Saints	Mario Bates	RB	Arizona State	
2*	45	Atlanta Falcons	Bert Emanuel	WR	Rice	from Minnesota (Note: No. 45: Minnesota → Atlanta (D). See Round 2: Atlanta → Minnesota.)
2*	46	Dallas Cowboys	Larry Allen^{‡}^{†}	G	Sonoma State	
2*	47	New York Giants	Thomas Randolph	CB	Kansas State	
2*	48	Buffalo Bills	Bucky Brooks	CB	North Carolina	
2*	49	Los Angeles Rams	Toby Wright	S	Nebraska	
2	50	Pittsburgh Steelers	Brentson Buckner	DE	Clemson	
2	51	Denver Broncos	Allen Aldridge	LB	Houston	
2	52	Los Angeles Raiders	James Folston	LB	Northeast Louisiana	from Minnesota (Note: No. 52: Minnesota → LA Raiders (D). Minnesota traded a second-round selection (52nd overall) to LA Raiders in exchange for second- and fourth-round selections (55th and 125th overall).)
2	53	San Francisco 49ers	Kevin Mitchell	LB	Syracuse	from Green Bay (Note: No. 53: Green Bay → San Francisco (D). Green Bay traded a second-round selection (53rd overall) to San Francisco in exchange for a third-round selection, a fifth-round selection and two sixth-round selections (84th, 149th, 175th and 190th overall).)
2	54	Miami Dolphins	Aubrey Beavers	LB	Oklahoma	
2	55	Minnesota Vikings	Fernando Smith	DE	Jackson State	from LA Raiders (Note: No. 55: LA Raiders → Minnesota (D). See Round 2: Minnesota → LA Raiders.)
2	56	Los Angeles Rams	Brad Ottis	DE	Wayne State	from San Francisco (Note: No. 56: San Francisco → LA Rams (D). See Round 1: LA Rams → San Francisco.)
2	57	Detroit Lions	Van Malone	CB	Texas	
2	58	Kansas City Chiefs	Donnell Bennett	FB	Miami (FL)	
2	59	New York Giants	Jason Sehorn	CB	USC	
2	60	Houston Oilers	Jeremy Nunley	DE	Alabama	
2	61	Buffalo Bills	Lonnie Johnson	TE	Florida State	
2	62	San Francisco 49ers	Tyronne Drakeford	FS	Virginia Tech	from Dallas (Note: No. 62: Dallas → San Francisco (D). See Round 1: San Francisco → Dallas.)
2*	63	San Diego Chargers	Vaughn Parker	G	UCLA	
2*	64	Buffalo Bills	Sam Rogers	LB	Colorado	
2*	65	Miami Dolphins	Tim Ruddy ^{†}	G	Notre Dame	from Arizona (Note: No. 65: Arizona → Miami (D). Arizona traded a second-round selection (65th overall) to Miami in exchange for a third-round selection and two fourth-round selections (89th, 115th and 121st overall).)
3	66	Cincinnati Bengals	Jeff Cothran	FB	Ohio State	
3	67	Indianapolis Colts	Jason Mathews	T	Texas A&M	
3	68	Washington Redskins	Tydus Winans	WR	Fresno State	
3	69	Tampa Bay Buccaneers	Harold Bishop	TE	LSU	
3	70	San Diego Chargers	Andre Coleman	WR	Kansas State	from New England (Note: No. 70: New England → San Diego (D). New England traded third- and fifth-round selections (70th and 137th overall) to San Diego in exchange for a third-round selection (78th overall) and RB Marion Butts.)
3	71	Los Angeles Rams	Keith Lyle	S	Virginia	
3	72	Atlanta Falcons	Anthony Phillips	CB	Texas A&M–Kingsville	
3	73	Seattle Seahawks	Lamar Smith	RB	Houston	
3	74	Chicago Bears	Jim Flanigan	DT	Notre Dame	
3	75	Cleveland Browns	Romeo Bandison	DT	Oregon	
3	76	Arizona Cardinals	Rich Braham	G	West Virginia	
3	77	Philadelphia Eagles	Joe Panos	G	Wisconsin	
3	78	New England Patriots	Ervin Collier	DT	Florida A&M	from San Diego (Note: No. 78: San Diego → New England (D). See Round 3: New England → San Diego.)
3	79	New Orleans Saints	Winfred Tubbs ^{†}	LB	Texas	
3	80	Los Angeles Raiders	Calvin Jones	RB	Nebraska	from NY Jets (Note: No. 80: NY Jets → LA Raiders (D). The NY Jets traded a third-round selection (80th overall) to the LA Raiders in exchange for third- and fifth-round selections (94th and 152nd overall).)
3*	81	Buffalo Bills	Marlo Perry	LB	Jackson State	
3*	82	San Diego Chargers	Willie Clark	CB	Notre Dame	
3*	83	Los Angeles Rams	James Bostic	RB	Auburn	from Atlanta via Indianapolis (Note: No. 83: Atlanta → Indianapolis → LA Rams. Multiple trades: Atlanta → Indianapolis (PD). See Round 1: Atlanta → Indianapolis. Indianapolis → LA Rams (D). See Round 1: LA Rams → Indianapolis.)
3*	84	Green Bay Packers	LeShon Johnson	RB	NIU	from San Francisco (Note: No. 84: San Francisco → Green Bay (D). See Round 2: Green Bay → San Francisco.)
3*	85	San Francisco 49ers	Doug Brien	K	California	
3*	86	Cincinnati Bengals	Steve Shine	LB	Northwestern	
3	87	San Francisco 49ers	Cory Fleming	WR	Tennessee	from Denver (Note: No. 87: Denver → San Francisco (PD). Denver traded third- and fifth-round selections (87th and 149th overall) to San Francisco in exchange for a third-round selection (99th overall) and DT Ted Washington.)
3	88	Pittsburgh Steelers	Jason Gildon ^{†}	LB	Oklahoma State	from Minnesota (Note: No. 88: Minnesota → Pittsburgh (PD). Minnesota traded third- and sixth-round selections (88th and 180th overall) to Pittsburgh in exchange for TE Adrian Cooper.)
3	89	Arizona Cardinals	Eric England	DE	Texas A&M	from Green Bay via Miami (Note: No. 89: Green Bay → Miami → Arizona. Multiple trades: Green Bay → Miami (D). See Round 1: Miami → Green Bay. Miami → Arizona (D). See Round 2: Arizona → Miami.)
3	90	New England Patriots	Joe Burch	C	Texas Southern	from Miami (Note: No. 90: Miami → New England (PD). Miami traded a third-round selection (90th overall) and a 1993 second-round selection to New England in exchange for WR Irving Fryar.)
3	91	Pittsburgh Steelers	Bam Morris	RB	Texas Tech	
3	92	Kansas City Chiefs	Lake Dawson	WR	Notre Dame	from San Francisco (Note: No. 92: San Francisco → Kansas City (PD). San Francisco traded a fourth-round selection (92nd overall) and QB Joe Montana to Kansas City in exchange for a 1993 first-round selection.)
3	93	Detroit Lions	Shane Bonham	DT	Tennessee	
3	94	New York Jets	Lou Benfatti	DT	Penn State	from LA Raiders (Note: No. 94: LA Raiders → NY Jets (D). See Round 3: NY Jets → LA Raiders.)
3	95	New York Giants	Gary Downs	RB	NC State	
3	96	Kansas City Chiefs	Chris Penn	WR	Tulsa	
3	97	Washington Redskins	Joe Patton	G	Alabama A&M	from Houston (Note: No. 97: Houston → Washington (PD). Houston sent a third-round selection (97th overall) and a 1995 fifth-round selection to Washington as compensation for signing restricted free agent LB Wilber Marshall.)
3	98	Buffalo Bills	Corey Louchiey	T	South Carolina	
3	99	Atlanta Falcons	Alai Kalaniuvalu	G	Oregon State	from Dallas via San Francisco and Denver (Note: No. 99: Dallas → San Francisco → Denver → Atlanta. Multiple trades: Dallas → San Francisco (PD). Dallas traded a third-round selection (99th overall) and a 1993 third-round selection to San Francisco in exchange for DE Charles Haley. San Francisco → Denver (PD). See Round 3: Denver → San Francisco. Denver → Atlanta (PD). Denver traded a third-round selection (99th overall) and a 1995 first-round selection to Atlanta in exchange for a 1995 seventh-round selection and WR Mike Pritchard.)
3*	100	Los Angeles Rams	Ernest Jones	LB	Oregon	from Philadelphia via San Francisco (Note: No. 100: Philadelphia → San Francisco → LA Rams. Multiple trades: Philadelphia → San Francisco (D). Philadelphia traded third- and sixth-round selections (100th and 190th overall) to San Francisco in exchange for LB Bill Romanowski. San Francisco → LA Rams (D). See Round 1: LA Rams → San Francisco.)
3*	101	Houston Oilers	Malcolm Floyd	WR	Fresno State	
3*	102	Dallas Cowboys	George Hegamin	T	NC State	
3*	103	Philadelphia Eagles	Eric Zomalt	S	California	
4	104	Cincinnati Bengals	Corey Sawyer	CB	Florida State	
4	105	Washington Redskins	Kurt Haws	TE	Utah	
4	106	Indianapolis Colts	Bradford Banta	LS	USC	
4	107	Arizona Cardinals	Perry Carter	CB	Southern Mississippi	from New England (Note: No. 107: New England → Arizona (D). New England traded a fourth-round selection (107th overall) to Arizona in exchange for fourth- and fifth-round selections (121st and 135th overall).)
4	108	Los Angeles Rams	Chris Brantley	WR	Rutgers	
4	109	Dallas Cowboys	Willie Jackson	WR	Florida	from Tampa Bay (Note: No. 109: Tampa Bay → Dallas (PD). Tampa Bay traded a fourth-round selection (109th overall) to Dallas in exchange for S Thomas Everett.)
4	110	Seattle Seahawks	Larry Whigham ^{†}	S	Northeast Louisiana	
4	111	Atlanta Falcons	Perry Klein	QB	C.W. Post	
4	112	Miami Dolphins	Ronnie Woolfork	LB	Colorado	from Cleveland (Note: No. 112: Cleveland → Miami (PD). Cleveland traded a fourth-round selection (112th overall) to Miami in exchange for G Gene Williams.)
4	113	Arizona Cardinals	John Reece	CB	Nebraska	
4	114	Chicago Bears	Raymont Harris	FB	Ohio State	
4	115	Arizona Cardinals	Terry Irving	LB	McNeese State	from San Diego via Miami (Note: No. 115: San Diego → Miami → Arizona. Multiple trades: San Diego → Miami (PD). San Diego traded a fourth-round selection (115th overall) to Miami in exchange for WR Tony Martin. Miami → Arizona (D). See Round 2: Arizona → Miami.)
4	116	New Orleans Saints	Doug Nussmeier	QB	Idaho	
4	117	New York Jets	Orlando Parker	WR	Troy State	
4	118	Atlanta Falcons	Mitch Davis	LB	Georgia	from Philadelphia (Note: No. 118: Philadelphia → Atlanta (D). See Round 2: Atlanta → Philadelphia.)
4	119	Houston Oilers	Mike Davis	CB	Cincinnati	from Minnesota (Note: No. 119: Minnesota → Houston (PD). Minnesota traded a fourth-round selection (119th overall) and a 1995 third-round selection to Houston in exchange for QB Warren Moon.)
4	120	Los Angeles Raiders	Austin Robbins	DE	North Carolina	from Green Bay (Note: No. 120: Green Bay → Oakland (D). Green Bay traded a fourth-round selection (120th overall) to the LA Raiders in exchange for fourth- and sixth-round selections (126th and 169th overall).)
4	121	New England Patriots	John Burke	TE	Virginia Tech	from Miami via Arizona (Note: No. 121: Miami → Arizona → New England. Multiple trades: Miami → Arizona (D). See Round 2: Arizona → Miami. Arizona → New England (D). See Round 4: Arizona → New England.)
4	122	Pittsburgh Steelers	Ta'ase Faumui	DE	Hawaii	
4	123	Denver Broncos	Randy Fuller	CB	Tennessee State	
4	124	Detroit Lions	Vaughn Bryant	DB	Stanford	
4	125	Minnesota Vikings	Mike Wells	DT	Iowa	from LA Raiders (Note: No. 125: LA Raiders → Minnesota (D). See Round 2: Minnesota → LA Raiders.)
4	126	Green Bay Packers	Gabe Wilkins	DE	Gardner–Webb	from San Francisco via LA Raiders (Note: No. 126: San Francisco → LA Raiders → Green Bay. Multiple trades: San Francisco → LA Raiders (PD). San Francisco traded a fourth-round selection (126th overall) to LA Raiders in exchange for WR Mervyn Fernandez. LA Raiders → Green Bay (D). See Round 4: Green Bay → LA Raiders.)
4	127	Kansas City Chiefs	Bracy Walker	S	North Carolina	
4	128	New York Giants	Chris Maumalanga	DT	Kansas	
4	129	Houston Oilers	Sean Jackson	RB	Florida State	
4	130	Buffalo Bills	Sean Crocker	CB	North Carolina	
4	131	Dallas Cowboys	DeWayne Dotson	LB	Ole Miss	
5	132	Cincinnati Bengals	Trent Pollard	T	Eastern Washington	
5	133	Indianapolis Colts	John Covington	S	Notre Dame	
5	134	Minnesota Vikings	Shelly Hammonds	DB	Penn State	from Washington (Note: No. 134: Washington → Minnesota (PD). Washington traded a fifth-round selection (134th overall) to Minnesota in exchange for QB Rich Gannon.)
5	135	New England Patriots	Pat O'Neill	P	Syracuse	from LA Rams via Arizona (Note: No. 135: LA Rams → Arizona → New England. Multiple trades: LA Rams → Arizona (PD). The LA Rams traded a fifth-round selection (134th overall) to Arizona in exchange for WR Ernie Jones. Arizona → New England (D). See Round 4: New England → Arizona.)
5	136	Tampa Bay Buccaneers	Pete Pierson	T	Washington	
5	137	San Diego Chargers	Aaron Laing	TE	New Mexico State	from New England (Note: No. 137: New England → San Diego (PD). See Round 3: New England → San Diego.)
5	138	Atlanta Falcons	Harrison Houston	WR	Florida	
5	139	Arizona Cardinals	Anthony Redmon	G	Auburn	
5	140	Pittsburgh Steelers	Myron Bell	S	Michigan State	from Chicago (Note: No. 140: Chicago → Pittsburgh (PD). Chicago traded a fifth-round selection (140th overall) to Pittsburgh in exchange for RB Tim Worley.)
5	141	Cleveland Browns	Issac Booth	CB	California	
5	142	New Orleans Saints	Herman Carroll	DE	Mississippi State	
5	143	New Orleans Saints	Craig Novitsky	G	UCLA	from NY Jets (Note: No. 143: NY Jets → New Orleans (D). See Round 1: New Orleans → NY Jets.)
5	144	Philadelphia Eagles	Marvin Goodwin	DB	UCLA	
5	145	San Diego Chargers	Rodney Harrison ^{†}	S	Western Illinois	
5	146	Green Bay Packers	Terry Mickens	WR	Florida A&M	
5	147	Miami Dolphins	William Gaines	DT	Florida	
5	148	Pittsburgh Steelers	Gary Brown	T	Georgia Tech	
5	149	Green Bay Packers	Dorsey Levens ^{†}	RB	Georgia Tech	from Denver via San Francisco (Note: No. 149: Denver → San Francisco → Green Bay. Multiple trades: Denver → San Francisco (PD). See Round 3: Denver → San Francisco. San Francisco → Green Bay (D). See Round 2: Green Bay → San Francisco.)
5	150	San Diego Chargers	Darren Krein	DE	Miami (FL)	from Seattle (Note: No. 150: Seattle → San Diego (D). Seattle traded a fifth-round selection (150th overall) to San Diego in exchange for a 1995 fourth-round selection.)
5	151	Kansas City Chiefs	James Burton	CB	Fresno State	from Minnesota (Note: No. 151: Minnesota → Kansas City (PD). Minnesota traded a fifth-round selection (151st overall) to Kansas City in exchange for RB Barry Word.)
5	152	New York Jets	Horace Morris	LB	Tennessee	from LA Raiders (Note: No. 152: LA Raiders → NY Jets (D). See Round 3: NY Jets → LA Raiders.)
5	153	San Francisco 49ers	Anthony Peterson	LB	Notre Dame	
5	154	Detroit Lions	Tony Semple	G	Memphis	
5	155	New York Giants	Chad Bratzke	DE	Eastern Kentucky	
5	156	Kansas City Chiefs	Rob Waldrop	DT	Arizona	
5	157	Houston Oilers	Roderick Lewis	TE	Arizona	
5	158	Buffalo Bills	A. J. Ofodile	TE	Missouri	
5	159	Los Angeles Raiders	Roosevelt Patterson	G	Alabama	from Dallas (Note: No. 159: Dallas → LA Raiders (PD). Dallas traded fifth- and seventh-round selections (159th and 217th overall) to the LA Raiders in exchange for a seventh-round selection (216th overall) and DB Elvis Patterson.)
5*	160	San Diego Chargers	Tony Vinson	RB	Towson	
5*	161	Houston Oilers	Jim Reid	T	Virginia	
6	162	Cincinnati Bengals	Kimo von Oelhoffen	DT	Boise State	
6	163	Washington Redskins	Dexter Nottage	DE	Florida A&M	
6	164	Indianapolis Colts	Lamont Warren	RB	Colorado	
6	165	Tampa Bay Buccaneers	Bernard Carter	LB	East Carolina	
6	166	New England Patriots	Steve Hawkins	WR	Western Michigan	
6	167	Los Angeles Rams	Rickey Brady	TE	Oklahoma	
6	168	New England Patriots	Max Lane	T	Navy	from Seattle (Note: No. 168: Seattle → New England (PD). Seattle traded a sixth-round selection (168th overall) to New England in exchange for RB Jon Vaughn.)
6	169	Green Bay Packers	Jay Kearney	WR	West Virginia	from Atlanta via LA Raiders (Note: No. 169: Atlanta → LA Raiders → Green Bay. Multiple trades: Atlanta → LA Raiders (PD). Atlanta traded a sixth-round selection (169th overall) to the LA Raiders in exchange for RB Eric Dickerson. LA Raiders → Green Bay (D). See Round 4: LA Raiders → Green Bay.)
6	170	Chicago Bears	Lloyd Hill	WR	Texas Tech	
6	171	Cleveland Browns	Robert Strait	RB	Baylor	
6	172	Arizona Cardinals	Terry Samuels	TE	Kentucky	
6	173	New York Jets	Fred Lester	RB	Alabama A&M	
6	174	Philadelphia Eagles	Ryan McCoy	LB	Houston	
6	175	Green Bay Packers	Ruffin Hamilton	LB	Tulane	from San Diego via San Francisco (Note: No. 175: San Diego → San Francisco → Green Bay. Multiple trades: San Diego → San Francisco (PD). San Diego traded a sixth-round selection (175th overall) to San Francisco in exchange for a 1993 eighth-round selection. San Francisco → Green Bay (D). See Round 2: Green Bay → San Francisco.)
6	176	New Orleans Saints	Derrell Mitchell	WR	Texas Tech	
6	177	Miami Dolphins	Brant Boyer	LB	Arizona	
6	178	Pittsburgh Steelers	Jim Miller	QB	Michigan State	
6	179	Minnesota Vikings	Andrew Jordan	TE	Western Carolina	from Denver (Note: No. 179: Denver → Minnesota (PD). See Round 1: Denver → Minnesota.)
6	180	Pittsburgh Steelers	Eric Ravotti	LB	Penn State	from Minnesota (Note: No. 180: Minnesota → Pittsburgh (PD). See Round 3: Minnesota → Pittsburgh.)
6	181	Green Bay Packers	Bill Schroeder	WR	Wisconsin–La Crosse	
6	182	San Francisco 49ers	Lee Woodall ^{†}	LB	West Chester	
6	183	Detroit Lions	Jocelyn Borgella	CB	Cincinnati	
6	184	Cincinnati Bengals	Jerry Reynolds	T	Nevada–Las Vegas	from LA Raiders (Note: No. 184: LA Raiders → Cincinnati (PD). The LA Raiders traded a sixth-round selection (184th overall) to Cincinnati in exchange for CB Rickey Dixon.)
6	185	Kansas City Chiefs	Anthony Daigle	RB	Fresno State	
6	186	New York Giants	Jason Winrow	G	Ohio State	
6	187	Houston Oilers	Lee Gissendaner	WR	Northwestern	
6	188	Buffalo Bills	Anthony Abrams	DE	Clark Atlanta	
6	189	Los Angeles Rams	Ronald Edwards	T	North Carolina A&T	from Dallas (Note: No. 189: Dallas → LA Rams (PD). Dallas traded a sixth-round selection (189th overall) to the LA Rams in exchange for TE Jim Price.)
6*	190	Green Bay Packers	Paul Duckworth	LB	Connecticut	from Philadelphia via San Francisco (Note: No. 190: Philadelphia → San Francisco → Green Bay. Multiple trades: Philadelphia → San Francisco (PD). See Round 4: Philadelphia → San Francisco. San Francisco → Green Bay (D). See Round 2: Green Bay → San Francisco.)
6*	191	Dallas Cowboys	Darren Studstill	S	West Virginia	from LA Rams (Note: No. 191: LA Rams → Dallas (D). The LA Rams traded a sixth-round selection (191st overall) to Dallas in exchange for a 1995 fourth-round selection.)
6*	192	Buffalo Bills	Kevin Knox	WR	Florida State	
6*	193	Philadelphia Eagles	Mitch Berger ^{†}	P	Colorado	
6*	194	Houston Oilers	Barron Wortham	LB	Texas-El Paso	
7	195	Cincinnati Bengals	Ramondo Stallings	DE	San Diego State	
7	196	Indianapolis Colts	Lance Teichelman	DT	Texas A&M	
7	197	Washington Redskins	Gus Frerotte ^{†}	QB	Tulsa	
7	198	New England Patriots	Jay Walker	QB	Howard	
7	199	Kansas City Chiefs	Steve Matthews	QB	Memphis	from LA Rams (Note: No. 199: LA Rams → Kansas City (PD). The LA Rams traded a seventh-round selection (199th overall) to Kansas City in exchange for LB Chris Martin.)
7	200	Tampa Bay Buccaneers	Jim Pyne	C	Virginia Tech	
7	201	Atlanta Falcons	Jamal Anderson ^{†}	RB	Utah	
7	202	Seattle Seahawks	Carlester Crumpler	TE	East Carolina	
7	203	Cleveland Browns	Andre Hewitt	T	Georgia	
7	204	Arizona Cardinals	Frank Harvey	RB	Georgia	
7	205	Chicago Bears	Dennis Collier	CB	Colorado	
7	206	Philadelphia Eagles	Mark Montgomery	RB	Wisconsin	
7	207	San Diego Chargers	Zane Beehn	LB	Kentucky	
7	208	New York Jets	Glenn Foley	QB	Boston College	
7	209	Pittsburgh Steelers	Brice Abrams	RB	Michigan State	
7	210	Denver Broncos	Keith Burns	LB	Oklahoma State	
7	211	Minnesota Vikings	Pete Bercich	LB	Notre Dame	
7	212	Denver Broncos	Butler By'not'e	CB	Ohio State	from Green Bay (Note: No. 212: Green Bay → Denver (PD). Green Bay traded a seventh-round selection (212th overall) to Denver in exchange for G Doug Widell.)
7	213	New Orleans Saints	Lance Lundberg	T	Nebraska	
7	214	Miami Dolphins	Sean Hill	CB	Montana State	
7	215	Detroit Lions	Tom Beer	LB	Wayne State	
7	216	Dallas Cowboys	Toddrick McIntosh	DT	Florida State	from LA Raiders (Note: No. 216: LA Raiders → Dallas (PD). See Round 5: Dallas → LA Raiders.)
7	217	Los Angeles Raiders	Rob Holmberg	LB	Penn State	from San Francisco via Dallas (Note: No. 217: San Francisco → Dallas → LA Raiders. Multiple trades: San Francisco → Dallas (D). See Round 1: San Francisco → Dallas. Dallas → LA Raiders (D). See Round 5: Dallas → LA Raiders.)
7	218	Denver Broncos	Tom Nalen ^{†}	C	Boston College	from NY Giants (Note: No. 218: NY Giants → Denver (PD). The NY Giants traded a seventh-round selection (218th overall) to Denver in exchange for WR Arthur Marshall.)
7	219	Kansas City Chiefs	Tracy Greene	TE	Grambling State	
7	220	Houston Oilers	Lemanski Hall	LB	Alabama	
7	221	Buffalo Bills	Filmel Johnson	DB	Illinois	
7	222	New England Patriots	Marty Moore	LB	Kentucky	from Dallas (Note: No. 222: Dallas → New England (PD). Dallas traded a seventh-round selection (222nd overall) to New England in exchange for QB Hugh Millen.)

== Supplemental draft ==
Rnd.	Pick	Team	Player	Pos.	College	Notes
4	223	New York Giants	Tito Wooten	S	Houston	
5	224	Dallas Cowboys	John Davis	TE	Virginia	

== Trades ==
In the explanations below, (D) denotes trades that took place during the 1994 Draft, while (PD) indicates trades completed pre-draft.

Round 1

Round 2

Round 3

Round 4

Round 5

Round 6

Round 7

== Notable undrafted players ==
†	Pro Bowler
‡	Hall of Famer

Original NFL team	Player	Pos.	College	Notes
Arizona Cardinals	Brent Alexander	S	Tennessee State	
Arizona Cardinals	Mac Cody	WR	Memphis State	
Arizona Cardinals	Bryan Reeves	WR	Nevada	
Atlanta Falcons	Eric Jack	CB	New Mexico	
Atlanta Falcons	Tyoka Jackson	DE	Penn State	
Atlanta Falcons	Pat Johnson	S	Purdue	
Buffalo Bills	John Bock	C	Indiana State	
Buffalo Bills	Greg Evans	S	TCU	
Buffalo Bills	Damon Thomas	WR	Wayne State	
Chicago Bears	Dwayne Joseph	CB	Syracuse	
Chicago Bears	Anthony Marshall	CB	LSU	
Cincinnati Bengals	Kevin Jefferson	LB	Lehigh	
Cleveland Browns	Rick Lyle	DE	Missouri	
Dallas Cowboys	Chris Boniol	K	Louisiana Tech	
Dallas Cowboys	Richie Cunningham	K	Louisiana–Lafayette	
Dallas Cowboys	Matt Joyce	T	Richmond	
Dallas Cowboys	Hurvin McCormack	DT	Indiana	
Dallas Cowboys	Tony Richardson ^{†}	FB	Auburn	
Denver Broncos	Dwayne Carswell ^{†}	TE	Liberty	
Denver Broncos	Derrick Clark	RB	Evangel	
Denver Broncos	Rod Smith ^{†}	WR	Missouri Southern State	
Detroit Lions	Ron Rivers	RB	Fresno State	
Green Bay Packers	Lenny McGill	CB	Arizona State	
Green Bay Packers	Kurt Warner^{‡}^{†}	QB	Northern Iowa	
Green Bay Packers	Mark Williams	LB	Ohio State	
Green Bay Packers	Jeff Wilner	TE	Wesleyan	
Indianapolis Colts	Aaron Bailey	WR	Louisville	
Indianapolis Colts	Vaughn Booker	DE	Cincinnati	
Indianapolis Colts	Bernard Whittington	DE	Indiana	
Kansas City Chiefs	Dunstan Anderson	DE	Tulsa	
Kansas City Chiefs	Monty Grow	S	Florida	
Kansas City Chiefs	Bernardo Harris	LB	North Carolina	
Los Angeles Raiders	Quentin Neujahr	C	Kansas State	
Los Angeles Rams	D'Marco Farr ^{†}	DT	Washington	
Los Angeles Rams	Jermaine Ross	WR	Purdue	
Miami Dolphins	Ethan Albright ^{†}	LS	North Carolina	
Miami Dolphins	Calvin Jackson	CB	Auburn	
Miami Dolphins	Shelton Quarles ^{†}	LB	Vanderbilt	
Miami Dolphins	Jay Williams	DE	Wake Forest	
Minnesota Vikings	Malik Boyd	DB	Southern	
Minnesota Vikings	Tony Carter	RB	Minnesota	
Minnesota Vikings	Robert Griffith ^{†}	CB	San Diego State	
New England Patriots	Rich Tylski	G	Utah State	
New Orleans Saints	Matt Campbell	G	South Carolina	
New Orleans Saints	Ernest Dixon	LB	South Carolina	
New Orleans Saints	Tyrone Johnson	WR	Western State	
New Orleans Saints	Alan Kline	T	Ohio State	
New Orleans Saints	Andy McCollum	C	Toledo	
New Orleans Saints	Ray Wilson	S	New Mexico	
New York Giants	Omar Douglas	WR	Minnesota	
New York Giants	Keith Elias	RB	Princeton	
Philadelphia Eagles	Mark Dixon	G	Virginia	
Philadelphia Eagles	Jay Fiedler	QB	Dartmouth	
Philadelphia Eagles	Brian O'Neal	FB	Penn State	
Philadelphia Eagles	Jeff Wilkins ^{†}	K	Youngstown State	
Pittsburgh Steelers	Corey Holliday	WR	North Carolina	
Pittsburgh Steelers	Walter Rasby	TE	Wake Forest	
San Diego Chargers	David Binn ^{†}	LS	California	
San Diego Chargers	Jeff Brohm	QB	Louisville	
San Diego Chargers	Greg Engel	C	Illinois	
San Diego Chargers	Mike Hollis ^{†}	K	Idaho	
San Diego Chargers	Shannon Mitchell	TE	Georgia	
San Francisco 49ers	Brett Carolan	TE	Washington State	
San Francisco 49ers	Jeff Garcia ^{†}	QB	San Jose State	
Seattle Seahawks	Jay Bellamy	S	Rutgers	
Seattle Seahawks	Bobby Hamilton	DE	Southern Miss	
Seattle Seahawks	Maurice Kelly	DB	East Tennessee State	
Seattle Seahawks	James McKnight	WR	Liberty	
Tampa Bay Buccaneers	Jerry Ellison	RB	Chattanooga	
Tampa Bay Buccaneers	Cedric Saunders	TE	Ohio State	
Washington Redskins	Nate Dingle	LB	Cincinnati	
Washington Redskins	Mike Sellers ^{†}	FB	Walla Walla CC	

== Hall of Famers ==
- Marshall Faulk, running back from San Diego State, drafted 1st round 2nd overall by Indianapolis Colts.

Inducted: class of 2011

- Larry Allen, offensive guard from Sonoma State, drafted 2nd round 46th overall by Dallas Cowboys.

Inducted: class of 2013

- Kurt Warner, quarterback from Northern Iowa, undrafted.

Inducted: class of 2017

- Kevin Mawae, offensive lineman from Louisiana State, drafted 2nd round 36th overall by Seattle Seahawks.

Inducted: Class of 2019

- Isaac Bruce, wide receiver from Memphis, drafted 2nd round 33rd overall by Los Angeles Rams.

Inducted: Class of 2020

- Bryant Young, defensive tackle from Notre Dame, drafted 1st round 7th overall by San Francisco 49ers.

Inducted: Class of 2022
