= 1993 NFL season =

American football season

Regular season
- Duration: September 5, 1993 – January 3, 1994

Playoffs
- Start date: January 8, 1994
- AFC Champions: Buffalo Bills
- NFC Champions: Dallas Cowboys

Super Bowl XXVIII
- Date: January 30, 1994
- Site: Georgia Dome, Atlanta, Georgia
- Champions: Dallas Cowboys

Pro Bowl
- Date: February 6, 1994
- Site: Aloha Stadium

AFC teams: West, Central, East
NFC teams: West, Central, East

The 1993 NFL season was the 74th regular season of the National Football League (NFL). It was the only season in league history where all NFL teams were originally scheduled to play their 16-game schedule over a span of 18 weeks and did so (the league again played 16 games over 18 weeks in 2001, but this was caused by the postponement of a week of games due to the September 11, 2001 terrorist attacks, where all of the Week 2 scheduled games were moved to an 18th week and the entire postseason was delayed by 7 days before starting). After the success of expanding the regular season to a period of 17 weeks in 1990, the league hoped this new schedule would generate even more revenue. This was also done to avoid scheduling playoff games on January 1 and competing with college football bowl games. The NFL's teams, however, felt that having two weeks off during the regular season was too disruptive for their weekly routines, and thus the regular season reverted to 17 weeks immediately after the season ended. 2021 marked the first season where an 18-week schedule would include 17 regular-season games.

On March 1, 1993, the current free agent system was introduced to the league, replacing the Plan B system instituted in 1989.

The season ended with Super Bowl XXVIII when the Dallas Cowboys defeated the Buffalo Bills 30–13 for the second consecutive season at the Georgia Dome. This remains the only time both Super Bowl participants have been the same in successive seasons. The Cowboys became the first team to win a Super Bowl after losing their first two regular season games. This game also marked the fourth consecutive Super Bowl loss by the Bills, who remain the only team to reach four straight Super Bowls.

== Player movement ==
=== Transactions ===
- On April 6, 1993, Reggie White was signed by the Green Bay Packers and agreed to terms on a four-year contract worth $17 million.
- June 9: The Kansas City Chiefs signed Los Angeles Raiders running back Marcus Allen.

=== Trades ===
- March 17, 1993: The Cincinnati Bengals traded Boomer Esiason to the New York Jets.
- April 20, 1993: Joe Montana was traded to the Kansas City Chiefs and signed a $10 million contract over three years.
- August 17: The Chicago Bears trade John Roper and Markus Paul to the Dallas Cowboys
- August 20: The Minnesota Vikings trade quarterback Rich Gannon to Washington.
- August 24: The Denver Broncos trade wide receiver Vance Johnson to the Minnesota Vikings
- August 26: The Phoenix Cardinals traded wide receiver Ernie Jones to the Los Angeles Rams.
- August 30: The Atlanta Falcons traded punter Tim Kalal to the Green Bay Packers.
- August 30: The Kansas City Chiefs trade running back Barry Word to the Minnesota Vikings.
- August 30: The Kansas City Chiefs trade guard Rich Baldinger to the New England Patriots.
- October 5: The Los Angeles Rams trade tight end Jim Price to the Dallas Cowboys.
- October 12: The Atlanta Falcons trade running back Eric Dickerson and cornerback Bruce Pickens to the Green Bay Packers.
- October 13: The Los Angeles Raiders trade special teams player Elvis Patterson to the Dallas Cowboys, along with a seventh round pick (#216-Toddrick McIntosh), in exchange for a fifth round (#159-Roosevelt Patterson) and a seventh round draft choice (#217-Rob Holmberg).
- October 19: The Pittsburgh Steelers traded running back Tim Worley to the Chicago Bears.

=== Draft ===
The 1993 NFL draft was held from April 25 to 26, 1993, at New York City's Marriott Marquis. With the first pick, the New England Patriots selected quarterback Drew Bledsoe from Washington State University.

== New referee ==
Ron Blum, a line judge from 1985 to 1992 who officiated Super Bowl XXIV and Super Bowl XXVI at that position, was promoted to referee to replace Pat Haggerty, who retired after the 1992 season. In 28 seasons in the NFL, Haggerty was selected as the referee for Super Bowl XIII in 1979, XVI in 1982, and XIX in 1985.

== Major rule changes ==
- The Play Clock (the time limit the offensive team has to snap the ball between plays) was reduced from 45 seconds to 40 seconds (the time interval after time outs and other administrative stoppages remained 25 seconds).
- Ineligible receiver down field prior to a forward pass foul was added.
- The passer could now legally throw a pass away, without any offensive player having a chance to catch the ball, as long as they are out of the pocket and the ball lands beyond the line of scrimmage.
- The player taking a snap from the center, upon receiving the ball, can immediately throw the football directly into the ground (i.e. spike) to stop the game clock.
- The NFL added an extra (second) bye week into the season for each team. The extra bye week was removed in 1994.

== Preseason ==
=== American Bowl ===
A series of NFL pre-season exhibition games were held at four varying sites outside the United States, with three in Europe and one in Japan.

Date	Winning team	Score	Losing team	Score	Stadium	City
August 1	New Orleans Saints	28	Philadelphia Eagles	16	Tokyo Dome	(Japan) Tokyo
August 1	San Francisco 49ers	21	Pittsburgh Steelers	14	Estadi Olímpic	(Spain) Barcelona
August 7	Minnesota Vikings	20	Buffalo Bills	6	Olympiastadion	(Germany) Berlin
August 8	Dallas Cowboys	13	Detroit Lions	13	Wembley Stadium	(United Kingdom) London

== Regular season ==
=== Scheduling formula ===
Inter-conference
AFC East vs NFC East
AFC Central vs NFC West
AFC West vs NFC Central

Highlights of the 1993 season included:

- Thanksgiving: Two games were played on Thursday, November 25, featuring Chicago at Detroit and Miami at Dallas, with Chicago and Miami winning.

=== Final standings ===
AFC East
	W	L	T	PCT	PF	PA	STK
^{(1)} Buffalo Bills	12	4	0	.750	329	242	W4
Miami Dolphins	9	7	0	.563	349	351	L5
New York Jets	8	8	0	.500	270	247	L3
New England Patriots	5	11	0	.313	238	286	W4
Indianapolis Colts	4	12	0	.250	189	378	L4

AFC Central
	W	L	T	PCT	PF	PA	STK
^{(2)} Houston Oilers	12	4	0	.750	368	238	W11
^{(6)} Pittsburgh Steelers	9	7	0	.563	308	281	W1
Cleveland Browns	7	9	0	.438	304	307	L1
Cincinnati Bengals	3	13	0	.188	187	319	L1

AFC West
	W	L	T	PCT	PF	PA	STK
^{(3)} Kansas City Chiefs	11	5	0	.688	328	291	W1
^{(4)} Los Angeles Raiders	10	6	0	.625	306	326	W1
^{(5)} Denver Broncos	9	7	0	.563	373	284	L2
San Diego Chargers	8	8	0	.500	322	290	W2
Seattle Seahawks	6	10	0	.375	280	314	L1

NFC East
	W	L	T	PCT	PF	PA	STK
^{(1)} Dallas Cowboys	12	4	0	.750	376	229	W5
^{(4)} New York Giants	11	5	0	.688	288	205	L2
Philadelphia Eagles	8	8	0	.500	293	315	W3
Phoenix Cardinals	7	9	0	.438	326	269	W3
Washington Redskins	4	12	0	.250	230	345	L2

NFC Central
	W	L	T	PCT	PF	PA	STK
^{(3)} Detroit Lions	10	6	0	.625	298	292	W2
^{(5)} Minnesota Vikings	9	7	0	.563	277	290	W3
^{(6)} Green Bay Packers	9	7	0	.563	340	282	L1
Chicago Bears	7	9	0	.438	234	230	L4
Tampa Bay Buccaneers	5	11	0	.313	237	376	L1

NFC West
	W	L	T	PCT	PF	PA	STK
^{(2)} San Francisco 49ers	10	6	0	.625	473	295	L2
New Orleans Saints	8	8	0	.500	317	343	W1
Atlanta Falcons	6	10	0	.375	316	385	L3
Los Angeles Rams	5	11	0	.313	221	367	W1

=== Tiebreakers ===
- Buffalo was the top AFC playoff seed based on head-to-head victory over Houston (1–0).
- Denver was the second AFC Wild Card ahead of Pittsburgh and Miami, based on better conference record (8–4 to Steelers' 7–5 to Dolphins' 6–6).
- Pittsburgh was the third AFC Wild Card based on head-to-head victory over Miami (1–0).
- San Francisco was the second NFC playoff seed based on head-to-head victory over Detroit (1–0).
- Minnesota finished ahead of Green Bay in the NFC Central based on head-to-head sweep (2–0).

== Playoffs ==
Jan 9 – Giants Stadium	Jan 15 – Candlestick Park
5	Minnesota	10
4	NY Giants	3
4	NY Giants	17	Jan 23 – Texas Stadium
2	San Francisco	44
NFC
Jan 8 – Pontiac Silverdome	2	San Francisco	21
Jan 16 – Texas Stadium
1	Dallas	38
6	Green Bay	28	NFC Championship
6	Green Bay	17
3	Detroit	24	Jan 30 – Georgia Dome
1	Dallas	27
Wild-card round
Divisional round
Jan 8 – Arrowhead Stadium	N1	Dallas	30
Jan 16 – Astrodome
A1	Buffalo	13
6	Pittsburgh	24	Super Bowl XXVIII
3	Kansas City	28
3	Kansas City	27*	Jan 23 – Rich Stadium
2	Houston	20
AFC
Jan 9 – Los Angeles Memorial Coliseum	3	Kansas City	13
Jan 15 – Rich Stadium
1	Buffalo	30
5	Denver	24	AFC Championship
4	LA Raiders	23
4	LA Raiders	42
1	Buffalo	29

* Indicates overtime victory

== Awards ==
Most Valuable Player	Emmitt Smith, running back, Dallas
Coach of the Year	Dan Reeves, NY Giants
Offensive Player of the Year	Jerry Rice, wide receiver, San Francisco
Defensive Player of the Year	Rod Woodson, cornerback, Pittsburgh
Offensive Rookie of the Year	Jerome Bettis, running back, LA Rams
Defensive Rookie of the Year	Dana Stubblefield, defensive tackle, San Francisco
NFL Comeback Player of the Year	Marcus Allen, running back, Kansas City
NFL Man of the Year	Derrick Thomas, linebacker, Kansas City
Super Bowl Most Valuable Player	Emmitt Smith, running back, Dallas

== Coaching changes ==
- Chicago Bears: Dave Wannstedt replaced the fired Mike Ditka.
- Denver Broncos: Wade Phillips replaced the fired Dan Reeves.
- New England Patriots: Bill Parcells replaced the fired Dick MacPherson.
- New York Giants: Dan Reeves replaced the fired Ray Handley.
- Washington Redskins: Richie Petitbon became head coach after Joe Gibbs retired.

== Uniform changes ==
- The New England Patriots introduced new uniforms, changing their primary color from red to royal blue, and their white helmets and pants to silver. They also replaced the "Pat Patriot" helmet logo with the later-coined "Flying Elvis", a gray face of a minuteman that fans felt resembled the profile of a young Elvis Presley.

== Television ==
This was the fourth and final year under the NFL's broadcast contracts with ABC, CBS, NBC, TNT, and ESPN. ABC, CBS, and NBC continued to televise Monday Night Football, the NFC package, the AFC package, respectively. Sunday night games aired on TNT during the first half of the season, and ESPN during the second half of the season. When new four-year contracts were signed in December 1993, CBS lost their rights to broadcasting NFC games to the then-seven-year old Fox Network, which had just started its own sports division. This ended a 37-year association with the NFL for CBS, although it would be restarted in 1998.

Jim Lampley became the new host of NBC's NFL Live!, replacing Bob Costas who would still contribute in a limited role. Mike Ditka also joined NFL Live! as an analyst, while O. J. Simpson became a regular on-site reporter. This would be Simpson's last season as an NFL broadcaster before being charged with murder in Summer 1994.
