= 1993 Gator Bowl =

1993 Outback Gator Bowl
Alabama Crimson Tide	North Carolina Tar Heels
(0–12)	(10–2)
SEC	ACC
24	10
Head coach: Gene Stallings	Head coach: Mack Brown
AP / Coaches / BC; 18 / 18 / 18	AP / Coaches / BC; 12 / 11 / 12
	1	2	3	4	Total
Alabama	0	10	7	7	24
North Carolina	0	10	0	0	10
- Date: December 31, 1993
- Season: 1993
- Stadium: Gator Bowl Stadium
- Location: Jacksonville, Florida
- MVP: Alabama QB - Brian Burgdorf; North Carolina WR - Corey Holliday
- Referee: Doyle Jackson (SWC)
- Attendance: 67,205

United States TV coverage
- Network: TBS
- Announcers: Gary Bender, Pat Haden and Craig Sager

The 1993 Gator Bowl, a bowl game during the 1993 NCAA Division I-A football season, took place on December 31, 1993, at the Gator Bowl Stadium in Jacksonville, Florida. The competing teams were the Alabama Crimson Tide, representing the Southeastern Conference (SEC), and the North Carolina Tar Heels, representing the Atlantic Coast Conference (ACC). Alabama won the game 24–10. With sponsorship by Outback Steakhouse, the game was officially known as the Outback Gator Bowl.

This was the last football game contested at the original Gator Bowl Stadium. The structure was demolished shortly after the bowl to build a new facility on the same site for the National Football League's Jacksonville Jaguars, who played their first season in 1995.

== Teams ==
=== Alabama ===
The 1993 Alabama squad opened the season ranked No. 2 only to tie with Tennessee in week six. The Crimson Tide went on to lose to both LSU and Auburn to finish the regular season with a record of 8–2–1. Although finishing second behind Auburn in the Western Division, as the Tigers were ineligible to play in the SEC Championship Game due to NCAA violations, Alabama played in the game for the second consecutive year. After losing to Florida for the SEC Championship, Alabama announced it accepted a bit to play in the Gator Bowl against North Carolina. The appearance marked the second for Alabama in the Gator Bowl.

In the week following the Iron Bowl, cornerback Antonio Langham was declared ineligible for both the SEC Championship Game and the Gator Bowl. In August 1995, the NCAA ruled that Langham was ineligible to participate with the Alabama squad retroactive to him signing with a sports agent following the 1992 season. As part of the NCAA sanctioned penalty, all games that Langham played in were officially forfeited changing their season record from 9–3–1 to 1–12 with the lone victory being over North Carolina in the Gator Bowl.

=== North Carolina ===
The 1993 North Carolina squad lost to both Florida State and Virginia to finish the regular season with a record of 10–2.

== Game summary ==
Scoring summary

Quarter	Time	Drive			Team	Scoring information	Score	
Quarter	Time	Plays	Yards	TOP	Team	Scoring information	Alabama	North Carolina
2	11:01		10 plays, 64 yards		Alabama	22-yard field goal by Michael Proctor	3	0
2	9:25		7 plays, 80 yards		North Carolina	William Henderson 1-yard touchdown run, Tripp Pignetti kick good	3	7
2	6:49		7 plays, 75 yards		Alabama	Brian Burgdorf 33-yard touchdown run, Michael Proctor kick good	10	7
2	00:02		7 plays, 44 yards		North Carolina	23-yard field goal by Tripp Pignetti	10	10
3	9:05		12 plays, 65 yards		Alabama	Tarrant Lynch 8-yard touchdown reception from Brian Burgdorf, Michael Proctor kick good	17	10
4	6:34		12 plays, 66 yards		Alabama	Chad Key 10-yard touchdown reception from Brian Burgdorf, Michael Proctor kick good	24	10
"TOP" = time of possession. For other American football terms, see Glossary of American football.							24	10
