= Devin Bush =

Devin Bush may refer to:

- Devin Bush Sr. (born 1973), American football safety
- Devin Bush Jr. (born 1998), American football linebacker
