= Elvis Patterson =

American football player (born 1960)

No. 34, 43
- Positions: Cornerback, safety

Personal information
- Born: October 21, 1960 (age 66); Bryan, Texas, U.S.
- Listed height: 5 ft 11 in (1.80 m)
- Listed weight: 193 lb (88 kg)

Career information
- High school: Yates (Houston, Texas)
- College: Kansas
- NFL draft: 1984: undrafted

Career history
- New York Giants (1984–1987); San Diego Chargers (1987–1989); Los Angeles Raiders (1990–1993); Dallas Cowboys (1993)

Awards and highlights
- 2× Super Bowl champion (XXI, XXVIII)

Career NFL statistics
- Interceptions: 12
- Fumble recoveries: 7
- Touchdowns: 4
- Stats at Pro Football Reference

Elvis Vernell "Toast" Patterson (born October 21, 1960) is an American former professional football player who was a defensive back in the National Football League (NFL) for the New York Giants, San Diego Chargers, Los Angeles Raiders and Dallas Cowboys. He played college football for the Kansas Jayhawks.

== Early life ==
Patterson attended Jack Yates High School. He accepted a football scholarship from the University of Kansas, where he began his career as a linebacker. As a senior, he was initially moved to defensive end, before being switched to cornerback.

== Professional career ==
=== New York Giants ===
He was selected by the Jacksonville Bulls in the tenth round (210th overall) of the 1984 USFL draft. He instead chose to sign as an undrafted free agent with the New York Giants on May 17, 1984. As a rookie, he played mainly on special teams.

In 1985, he was named the starter at left cornerback.

In 1986, he helped the team win Super Bowl XXI.

Patterson's nickname of "Toast" is a rather unflattering one that was given to him by Bill Parcells during his days as a Giant; the name comes from his knack for allowing wide receivers to make big plays while he was covering them. He was surprisingly waived on September 15, 1987, after a Monday Night Football performance against the Chicago Bears where he had to leave the game in two occasions with leg cramps and his coverage was badly beaten by Willie Gault (it was later claimed that the night before he was out partying).

=== San Diego Chargers ===
After the players went on a strike on the third week of the 1987 season, those games were canceled (reducing the 16 game season to 15) and the NFL decided that the games would be played with replacement players. Patterson was signed to be a part of the San Diego Chargers replacement team. He ended up playing well as the left cornerback starter, and was kept for the rest of the year, recording 8 additional starts. After three inconsistent seasons, he was left unprotected in Plan B free agency in 1990.

=== Los Angeles Raiders ===
On April 2, 1990, he signed as a Plan B free agent with the Los Angeles Raiders. He was waived on September 3 and later re-signed. He became a special teams standout and earned the nickname Ghost. He was a special teams captain for three years.

On October 13, 1993, he was traded along with a seventh round pick (#216-Toddrick McIntosh) to the Dallas Cowboys, in exchange for a fifth round (#159-Roosevelt Patterson) and a seventh round draft choice (#217-Rob Holmberg).

=== Dallas Cowboys ===
In 1993, he played mainly on special teams, registering 13 special teams tackles (fourth on the team) and was a part of the Super Bowl XXVIII Championship team. He wasn't re-signed after the season.

== Personal life ==
After his successful career as an NFL defensive back, he soon found success in coaching. In 2005 Patterson coached a middle school football team, the Lakewood Cougars, to a winning 5-2 season. In 2009, he was the head coach for Northeast H.S. (KCMO) Placing 1st in the division (5A)-Interscholastic League, Awarded Coach of the year by the Kansas City Chiefs Alumni (Kimble Anders) along with his Assistant Coaching staff. Head Coach-Elvis Patterson / Assist. Head Coach-Gregory Martin Jr. (Greg Martin). Elvis Patterson defense coordinator, Gregory Martin, Jr. offensive coordinator came together and these coaches gave Northeast their first All-American/ All-State player (Kawann Parrish) along with two candidates for All-American, and their first winning season in twenty years. Regular season (3-4), Districts (0-3) due to technicalities.

In 2010, Elvis established a sporting events company, where he is CEO/Commissioner and head coach.
