= Toddrick =

Toddrick is a given name. Notable people with the given name include:

- Toddrick Gotcher (born 1993), American basketball player
- Toddrick McIntosh (1972–2014), American football player

== See also ==
- Todrick Hall (born 1985), American singer, performer, dancer, rapper, choreographer, activist, and YouTuber
