= 1993 Maryland Terrapins football team =

American college football season

1993 Maryland Terrapins football
- Conference: Atlantic Coast Conference
- Record: 2–9 (2–6 ACC)
- Head coach: Mark Duffner (2nd season)
- Offensive coordinator: Dan Dorazio (2nd season)
- Offensive scheme: Run and shoot
- Defensive coordinator: Larry Slade (2nd season)
- Base defense: 4–3
- Home stadium: Byrd Stadium

1993 Atlantic Coast Conference football standings
	Conf.			Overall
Team	W		L	W		L
No. 1 Florida State $	8	–	0	12	–	1
No. 19 North Carolina	6	–	2	10	–	3
No. 23 Clemson	5	–	3	9	–	3
Virginia	5	–	3	7	–	5
NC State	4	–	4	7	–	5
Georgia Tech	3	–	5	5	–	6
Duke	2	–	6	3	–	8
Maryland	2	–	6	2	–	9
Wake Forest	1	–	7	2	–	9
$ – Conference champion; Rankings from AP Poll

The 1993 Maryland Terrapins football team represented the University of Maryland in the 1993 NCAA Division I-A football season. In their second season under head coach Mark Duffner, the Terrapins compiled a 2–9 record, finished in a tie for seventh place in the Atlantic Coast Conference, and were outscored by their opponents 479 to 243. The team's statistical leaders included Scott Milanovich with 3,499 passing yards, Mark Mason with 606 rushing yards, and Jermaine Lewis with 957 receiving yards.

== Schedule ==
Date	Time	Opponent	Site	TV	Result	Attendance	Source
September 4		Virginia	Byrd Stadium; College Park, MD (rivalry)		L 29–43	35,015	
September 11		at No. 14 North Carolina	Kenan Memorial Stadium; Chapel Hill, NC		L 42–59	50,000	
September 18	7:00 p.m.	West Virginia*	Byrd Stadium; College Park, MD (rivalry)		L 37–42	42,008	
September 25	1:00 p.m.	at Virginia Tech*	Lane Stadium; Blacksburg, VA		L 28–55	38,829	
October 2	7:00 p.m.	No. 9 Penn State*	Byrd Stadium; College Park, MD (rivalry)		L 7–70	42,008	
October 9		at Georgia Tech	Bobby Dodd Stadium; Atlanta, GA		L 0–38	36,218	
October 16		Duke	Byrd Stadium; College Park, MD		W 26–18	31,487	
October 30	12:00 p.m.	at Clemson	Memorial Stadium; Clemson, SC	JPS	L 0–29	66,147	
November 6		No. 1 Florida State	Byrd Stadium; College Park, MD		L 20–49	36,255	
November 13		at NC State	Carter–Finley Stadium; Raleigh, NC		L 21–44	35,120	
November 20	1:00 p.m.	at Wake Forest	Groves Stadium; Winston-Salem, NC		W 33–32	12,521	
*Non-conference game; Rankings from AP Poll released prior to the game; All times are in Eastern time

== Roster ==
1993 Maryland Terrapins football team roster
Players
Coaches
Offense

Pos.	#	Name	Class
WR	4	Jermaine Lewis	So
QB	13	Scott Milanovich	So

Defense

Pos.	#	Name	Class

Special teams

Pos.	#	Name	Class

Head coach

- Mark Duffner

Coordinators/assistant coaches

Legend

- (C) Team captain
- (S) Suspended
- (I) Ineligible
- Injured
- Redshirt
