= 1993 North Carolina Tar Heels football team =

American college football season

1993 North Carolina Tar Heels football

Gator Bowl, L 10–24 vs Alabama
- Conference: Atlantic Coast Conference

Ranking
- Coaches: No. 21
- AP: No. 19
- Record: 10–3 (6–3 ACC)
- Head coach: Mack Brown (6th season)
- Offensive scheme: Multiple
- Defensive coordinator: Carl Torbush (6th season)
- Base defense: 4–3
- Captains: Corey Holliday; Rick Steinbacher
- Home stadium: Kenan Memorial Stadium

1993 Atlantic Coast Conference football standings
	Conf.			Overall
Team	W		L	W		L
No. 1 Florida State $	8	–	0	12	–	1
No. 19 North Carolina	6	–	2	10	–	3
No. 23 Clemson	5	–	3	9	–	3
Virginia	5	–	3	7	–	5
NC State	4	–	4	7	–	5
Georgia Tech	3	–	5	5	–	6
Duke	2	–	6	3	–	8
Maryland	2	–	6	2	–	9
Wake Forest	1	–	7	2	–	9
$ – Conference champion; Rankings from AP Poll

The 1993 North Carolina Tar Heels football team represented the University of North Carolina at Chapel Hill during the 1993 NCAA Division I-A football season. The Tar Heels played their home games at Kenan Memorial Stadium in Chapel Hill, North Carolina and competed in the Atlantic Coast Conference. The team was led by head coach Mack Brown.

== Schedule ==
Date	Time	Opponent	Rank	Site	TV	Result	Attendance	Source
August 29	9:00 p.m.	vs. No. 18 USC*	No. 20	Anaheim Stadium; Anaheim, CA (Pigskin Classic)	Raycom	W 31–9	49,309	
September 4	7:00 p.m.	Ohio*	No. 16	Kenan Memorial Stadium; Chapel Hill, NC		W 44–3	35,000	
September 11	1:30 p.m.	Maryland	No. 14	Kenan Memorial Stadium; Chapel Hill, NC		W 59–42	50,000	
September 18	7:30 p.m.	No. 1 Florida State	No. 13	Kenan Memorial Stadium; Chapel Hill, NC	ESPN	L 7–33	54,100	
September 25	12:10 p.m.	at No. 19 NC State	No. 18	Carter–Finley Stadium; Raleigh, NC (rivalry)		W 35–14	54,400	
October 2	1:30 p.m.	UTEP*	No. 16	Kenan Memorial Stadium; Chapel Hill, NC		W 45–39	49,000	
October 9	12:10 p.m.	Wake Forest	No. 15	Kenan Memorial Stadium; Chapel Hill, NC (rivalry)	JPS	W 45–35	51,000	
October 16	12:05 p.m.	at Georgia Tech	No. 14	Bobby Dodd Stadium; Atlanta, GA		W 41–3	39,216	
October 23	3:30 p.m.	at No. 21 Virginia	No. 12	Scott Stadium; Charlottesville, VA (South's Oldest Rivalry)		L 10–17	42,300	
November 6	7:30 p.m.	Clemson	No. 16	Kenan Memorial Stadium; Chapel Hill, NC	ESPN	W 24–0	51,500	
November 13	8:00 p.m.	at Tulane*	No. 15	Louisiana Superdome; New Orleans, LA		W 42–10	20,492	
November 26	11:00 a.m.	Duke	No. 13	Kenan Memorial Stadium; Chapel Hill, NC (Victory Bell)		W 38–24	50,000	
December 31	7:00 p.m.	vs. No. 18 Alabama*	No. 12	Gator Bowl Stadium; Jacksonville, FL (Gator Bowl)	TBS	L 10–24	67,205	
*Non-conference game; Rankings from AP Poll released prior to the game; All times are in Eastern time

== Roster ==
1993 North Carolina Tar Heels football team roster
Players
Coaches
Offense

Pos.	#	Name	Class
WR	1	Corey Holliday	Sr
WR	7	Bucky Brooks	Sr
C	54	Matt Jennings	So
OT	64	Ethan Albright	Sr
TE	85	Greg DeLong	Jr

Defense

Pos.	#	Name	Class
DB	18	Jimmy Hitchcock	Jr
LB	24	Bernardo Harris	Sr
OLB	41	Ray Jacobs	Sr
LB	82	Mike Morton	Jr
DT	97	Riddick Parker	Sr

Special teams

Pos.	#	Name	Class
DS	68	Stu Holt	Jr

Head coach

- Mack Brown

Coordinators/assistant coaches

- E. J. Sandusky (graduate assistant)

Legend

- (C) Team captain
- (S) Suspended
- (I) Ineligible
- Injured
- Redshirt

Roster
