= Scott Bentley =

American football player (born 1974)

No. 3, 9, 1
- Position: Placekicker

Personal information
- Born: April 10, 1974 (age 52); Dallas, Texas, U.S.

Career information
- High school: Overland (Aurora, Colorado)
- College: Florida State
- NFL draft: 1997: undrafted

Career history
- Arizona Cardinals (1997)*; Denver Broncos (1997); Atlanta Falcons (1997); Denver Broncos (1998)*; Tampa Bay Buccaneers (1999)*; Baltimore Ravens (1999)*; Kansas City Chiefs (1999); Denver Broncos (2000)*; Washington Redskins (2000); Berlin Thunder (2001)
- * Offseason or practice squad member only

Awards and highlights
- National champion (1993)

Career NFL statistics
- Field goals: 3 / 4
- Field goal %: 75
- Extra points: 4 / 4
- Stats at Pro Football Reference

Scott L. Bentley (born April 10, 1974) is an American former professional football player who was a placekicker in the National Football League (NFL). He played college football for the Florida State Seminoles.

== Early life ==
Bentley attended Overland High School in Aurora, Colorado and had a decorated high school career. At the time, his 35 field goals ranked third all-time in high school football history.

Kicking coach Ray Pelfrey considered Bentley to be the "greatest kicker there has been."

He made 123 of 125 extra points and converted 28 of 36 field goals inside 50 yards. He was 7 of 14 on field goals from 50 yards over longer, with a long of 58 yards and scored 228 points. 34 of his career kickoffs went through the uprights. His senior year, he averaged 44.9 yards per punt.

After his senior year year, he was named to the USA Today All-American team. Bentley was also a two-time Parade All-American.

Bentley played free safety and was the starting quarterback in an option offense. He rushed for almost 1000 yards and threw for 600 yards and scored nine touchdowns. He clocked 4.4 in the 40 yard dash. In addition to football, he played shortstop on the baseball team.

His recruitment drew national attention, culminating in a high-profile battle between the Notre Dame Fighting Irish and the Florida State Seminoles. Bentley’s accuracy, consistency, and long-range ability made him one of the top kicking prospects in the country, an unusual distinction for a specialist at the time. During the recruiting process, then-Notre Dame head coach Lou Holtz famously warned Bentley that choosing Florida State over Notre Dame would be “a 40-year mistake,” a comment that underscored both the intensity of the recruitment and Notre Dame’s desire to secure his commitment.

== College career ==
Bentley arrived at Florida State as a highly touted freshman and was widely viewed as the program’s long-term solution to its recurring late-game kicking failures, most notably Wide Right I and Wide Right II. His recruitment and early elevation to starting placekicker over incumbent kicker Dan Mowrey reflected the staff’s intent to stabilize special teams and put an end to the Seminoles’ reputation for critical misses in rivalry games.

Bentley was on the cover of Sports Illustrated's "College Football Preview" in 1993, later to be victimized by the "Cover Jinx" after missing seven extra point attempts his freshman year in the season's first five games.

In 1993, Bentley appeared in 12 games during his freshman year at Florida State, serving as the Seminoles’ primary placekicker. He converted 13 of 20 field-goal attempts and 56 of 65 extra points, totaling 95 points. He was named to the ACC Third Team All-Conference. He kicked the game-winning field goal in the 1994 Orange Bowl to beat Nebraska, 18-16, for program's first national title.

As a sophomore in 1994, Bentley played in 11 games and made 4 of 7 field-goal attempts while converting 26 of 28 extra points. He scored 38 points on the season. After Bentley struggled with missed extra points and field goals, senior kicker Dan Mowrey regained the kicking duties during the Seminoles’ seventh game of the season against the Clemson Tigers.

Bentley also played outfield for the Florida State Seminoles baseball team in 1994.

His junior year in 1995, Bentley appeared in 11 games, making 9 of 16 field goals and 67 of 71 extra points, accounting for 94 points.

In his senior year in 1996, Bentley delivered his most efficient season, playing in 11 games and converting 16 of 18 field-goal attempts, including a career long 49-yard field goal against Maryland, and 52 of 53 extra points. He scored 100 points, finishing the season with a career-best 88.9% field-goal percentage. At the end of the season, he was named to the ACC All-Conference Team as an honorable mention pick.

Bentley concluded his college career with 42 made field goals on 61 attempts (68.9%) and 201 of 217 extra points (92.6%) over 45 games.

== Professional career ==
Bentley entered the NFL in 1997 as an undrafted free agent, initially spending time with the Arizona Cardinals before moving through a series of practice squads and short-term contracts.

He saw regular-season action with the Denver Broncos, Atlanta Falcons, Kansas City Chiefs, and Washington Redskins, as a placekicker and kickoff specialist. Across his NFL tenure, Bentley played in 12 regular-season games and made 3 of 4 field goal attempts, giving him a field goal percentage of 75.0%. His longest successful field goal was 50 yards. In addition to field goals, he was perfect on 4 extra point attempts (4/4).

He was also a member of the 2001 World Bowl Champion Berlin Thunder of NFL Europa and kicked a 53-yard field goal for the first points of World Bowl IX.

== Life after football ==
After his NFL career, Bentley moved back to Colorado.
