= 1993 Duke Blue Devils football team =

American college football season

1993 Duke Blue Devils football
- Conference: Atlantic Coast Conference
- Record: 3–8 (2–6 ACC)
- Head coach: Barry Wilson (4th season)
- Offensive coordinator: Buddy Geis (1st season)
- Defensive coordinator: Dale Strahm (4th season)
- MVP: Matt Williams
- Captains: Steve Alderfer; Robert Baldwin; Brad Sherrod; Scott Youmans
- Home stadium: Wallace Wade Stadium

1993 Atlantic Coast Conference football standings
	Conf.			Overall
Team	W		L	W		L
No. 1 Florida State $	8	–	0	12	–	1
No. 19 North Carolina	6	–	2	10	–	3
No. 23 Clemson	5	–	3	9	–	3
Virginia	5	–	3	7	–	5
NC State	4	–	4	7	–	5
Georgia Tech	3	–	5	5	–	6
Duke	2	–	6	3	–	8
Maryland	2	–	6	2	–	9
Wake Forest	1	–	7	2	–	9
$ – Conference champion; Rankings from AP Poll

The 1993 Duke Blue Devils football team represented Duke University as a member of the Atlantic Coast Conference (ACC) during the 1993 NCAA Division I-A football season. Led by fourth-year head coach Barry Wilson, the Blue Devils compiled an overall record of 3–8 with a mark of 2–6 in conference play, and finished seventh in the ACC. Duke played home games at Wallace Wade Stadium in Durham, North Carolina.

== Schedule ==
Date	Time	Opponent	Site	TV	Result	Attendance	Source
September 4	7:00 p.m.	No. 1 Florida State	Wallace Wade Stadium; Durham, NC	PPV	L 7–45	26,800	
September 11		at Rutgers*	Giants Stadium; East Rutherford, NJ	BEN	L 38–39	26,854	
September 18		Army*	Wallace Wade Stadium; Durham, NC		W 42–21	21,300	
September 25		at No. 22 Virginia	Scott Stadium; Charlottesville, VA		L 0–35	37,700	
October 2	4:00 p.m.	at No. 11 Tennessee*	Neyland Stadium; Knoxville, TN	PPV	L 19–52	96,173	
October 9	1:30 p.m.	Clemson	Wallace Wade Stadium; Durham, NC		L 10–13	18,600	
October 16		at Maryland	Byrd Stadium; College Park, MD		L 18–26	31,487	
October 23	1:00 p.m.	at Wake Forest	Groves Stadium; Winston-Salem, NC (rivalry)		W 21–13	20,123	
October 30		Georgia Tech^{†}	Wallace Wade Stadium; Durham, NC		L 14–47	30,470	
November 6		No. 22 NC State	Wallace Wade Stadium; Durham, NC (rivalry)		W 21–20	15,200	
November 26		at No. 13 North Carolina	Kenan Memorial Stadium; Chapel Hill, NC (Victory Bell)		L 24–38	50,000	
*Non-conference game; ^{†}Homecoming; Rankings from AP Poll released prior to the game; All times are in Eastern time
