= Devin Bush Sr. =

American football player and coach (born 1973)

Devin Bush
No. 42, 25, 23
- Position: Safety

Personal information
- Born: July 3, 1973 (age 53); Miami, Florida, U.S.
- Listed height: 5 ft 11 in (1.80 m)
- Listed weight: 210 lb (95 kg)

Career information
- High school: Hialeah (FL) Miami Lakes
- College: Florida State
- NFL draft: 1995: 1st round, 26th overall pick

Career history

Playing
- Atlanta Falcons (1995–1998); St. Louis Rams (1999–2000); Cleveland Browns (2001–2002)

Coaching
- Michigan (2016–2019) Defensive analyst; Ole Miss (2020–2022) Director of football recruiting; Orlando Guardians (2023) Defensive Backs coach

Awards and highlights
- Super Bowl champion (XXXIV); PFWA All-Rookie Team (1995); Bowl Coalition National Championship (1993); Second-team All-ACC (1994); Third-team All-ACC (1993)

Career NFL statistics
- Tackles: 428
- Interceptions: 7
- Forced fumbles: 5
- Defensive touchdowns: 3
- Stats at Pro Football Reference

Devin Marquese Bush Sr. (born July 3, 1973) is an American former professional football player who was a safety in the National Football League (NFL) for eight seasons during the 1990s and early 2000s. Bush played college football for Florida State University (FSU), where he was a member of FSU's 1993 national championship team. He was selected by the Atlanta Falcons in the first round of the 1995 NFL draft, and he also played professionally for the NFL's St. Louis Rams and Cleveland Browns.

== Early life ==
Bush was born in Miami, Florida. He attended Hialeah-Miami Lakes High School in Hialeah, Florida, where he was a standout high school football player for the Hialeah-Miami Lakes Trojans.

== College football career ==
Bush received an athletic scholarship to attend Florida State University, where he played for coach Bobby Bowden's Florida State Seminoles football team from 1992 to 1994. As a sophomore in 1993, Bush was a starting safety for the Seminoles' Bowl Coalition national championship team that defeated the Nebraska Cornhuskers 18–16 in the Orange Bowl. During his three-year college career as a Seminole, the team won three consecutive Atlantic Coast Conference (ACC) championships, and Bush received All-ACC honors in 1993 and 1994. His defensive coordinator at Florida State, Mickey Andrews, later said Bush "was the most complete player he had ever coached."

== Professional football career ==
Pre-draft measurables
Height	Weight	Arm length	Hand span	Bench press
5 ft 11 3/8 in (1.81 m)	208 lb (94 kg)	31 3/8 in (0.80 m)	9 5/8 in (0.24 m)	13 reps
All values from NFL Combine

The Atlanta Falcons chose Bush in the first round, with the 26th overall pick, of the 1995 NFL draft. Between 1995 and 2002, he played at both safety spots in his career for the Atlanta Falcons, St. Louis Rams and Cleveland Browns. He appeared in two Super Bowls: the Falcons' loss to the Denver Broncos in Super Bowl XXXIII at the end of the 1998–99 season, and the St. Louis Rams' 23–16 win over the Tennessee Titans in Super Bowl XXXIV in 1999–2000. Bush had seven career interceptions, two of which he returned for touchdowns.

== Coaching career ==
In April 2013, he became a football coach at Charles W. Flanagan High School in Pembroke Pines, Florida.

On February 18, 2016, Bush became a defensive analyst for the University of Michigan under head coach Jim Harbaugh, joining his son, Devin Bush Jr., who was part of Michigan's 2016 recruiting class, in Ann Arbor.

On February 7, 2020, Ole Miss announced that Bush joined their staff as their director of recruiting.

== Personal life ==
Devin Jr. was also a first-round draft pick in the 2019 NFL draft to the Pittsburgh Steelers.

== NFL career statistics ==
Year	Team	GP	Tackles				Fumbles			Interceptions					
Year	Team	GP	Cmb	Solo	Ast	Sck	FF	FR	Yds	Int	Yds	Avg	Lng	TD	PD
1995	ATL	11	35	21	14	0.0	0	0	0	1	0	0.0	0	0	5
1996	ATL	16	58	50	8	0.0	1	1	0	1	2	2.0	2	0	3
1997	ATL	16	84	69	15	0.0	1	1	0	1	4	4.0	4	0	7
1998	ATL	13	17	13	4	0.0	2	0	0	0	0	0.0	0	0	1
1999	STL	16	42	35	7	0.0	1	1	0	2	45	22.5	45	1	5
2000	STL	13	67	50	17	1.0	0	0	0	0	0	0.0	0	0	3
2001	CLE	16	62	43	19	0.0	1	1	0	2	62	31.0	43	1	4
2002	CLE	5	41	35	6	0.0	0	0	0	0	0	0.0	0	0	1
Career		116	406	316	90	1.0	6	4	0	7	113	16.1	45	2	29
