= Bill Lewis (American football coach) =

American football player and coach (born 1941)

Biographical details
- Born: August 5, 1941 (age 85); Philadelphia, Pennsylvania, U.S.

Playing career

Football
- 1959–1962: East Stroudsburg

Baseball
- 1960–1963: East Stroudsburg
- Positions: Quarterback (football); Pitcher, infielder (baseball)

Coaching career (HC unless noted)
- 1963–1965: East Stroudsburg (QB/WR/DB)
- 1966–1968: Pittsburgh (DB)
- 1969–1970: Wake Forest (DB)
- 1971–1972: Georgia Tech (DB)
- 1974–1976: Arkansas (DB)
- 1977–1979: Wyoming
- 1980: Georgia (DB)
- 1981–1988: Georgia (DC/DB)
- 1989–1991: East Carolina
- 1992–1994: Georgia Tech
- 1996–2004: Miami Dolphins (nickel package)
- 2005–2007: Notre Dame (AHC/DB)

Administrative career (AD unless noted)
- 1995: Marist School (GA)

Head coaching record
- Overall: 45–52–2
- Bowls: 1–0

Accomplishments and honors

Awards
- AFCA Coach of the Year (1991)

William J. Lewis (born August 5, 1941) is an American former football player and coach. He served as the head football coach at the University of Wyoming (1977–1979), and East Carolina University (1989–1991). He also coached at the Georgia Institute of Technology (1992–1994), compiling a career college football record of 45–52–2. Lewis was a defensive assistant at many schools and most notably served as an assistant to Vince Dooley at the University of Georgia, helping win a National Championship in 1980.

== Coaching career ==
=== Arkansas ===
Lewis was defensive backs coach with the Arkansas Razorbacks from 1973 until 1976.

=== Wyoming ===
Lewis was named the University of Wyoming's 22nd head football coach in December 1976 following the hiring of Fred Akers by the University of Texas at Austin to be the Longhorn's head coach.

Lewis compiled a 13–21–1 (.386) win–loss record as Wyoming's coach through the 1977 to 1979 seasons. He was fired at the conclusion of the '79 season and replaced by Pat Dye. His largest margin of victory was 51–21 over the University of Texas at El Paso during the 1978 season. His worst loss as the Cowboys head coach came against LSU the year before, 1977. The LSU Tigers pounced on Wyoming, 66–7, in Baton Rouge.

During his tenure at Wyoming, Lewis produced two noted NFL prospects, Ken Fantetti, a linebacker who went on to play for the Detroit Lions for seven years (1979–1985) and Guy Frazier another linebacker who played six years in the NFL for the Cincinnati Bengals (1981–1984) and the Buffalo Bills (1985–1986).

=== East Carolina ===
In his most successful head coaching position, Lewis led the East Carolina Pirates to an 11–1 record and a come from behind Peach Bowl victory over North Carolina State in 1991. The program had not had a winning season since 1983 before Lewis arrived.

Lewis served as head coach at East Carolina for three seasons (1989–1991) before departing for Georgia Tech. The 1991 Pirates finished the season with their highest national ranking, #9 in both the AP Poll and the Coaches' Poll, and Lewis received 1991 National Coach-of-the-Year honors from the American Football Coaches Association, United Press International, and Scripps-Howard.

=== Georgia Tech ===
Lewis assumed the head coaching position at Georgia Tech in 1991 following Bobby Ross's departure to coach the NFL's San Diego Chargers. Lewis held the position from 1992 until midway through the 1994 season; he resigned (though some reports say he was effectively fired) after a 1–7 start and was replaced by defensive coordinator George O'Leary. O'Leary coached the final three games of the season, all losses.

=== Notre Dame ===
From 2005 to 2007, Lewis served as the assistant head coach and defensive backs coach for the Notre Dame Fighting Irish under Charlie Weis.

== Personal life ==
Lewis and his wife Sandy have two sons, Geoff and Mark, and several grandchildren.

== Head coaching record ==
Year	Team	Overall	Conference	Standing	Bowl/playoffs	Coaches^{#}	AP^{°}
Wyoming Cowboys (Western Athletic Conference) (1977–1979)
1977	Wyoming	4–6–1	4–3	4th			
1978	Wyoming	5–7	4–2	T–2nd			
1979	Wyoming	4–8	2–5	7th			
Wyoming:		13–21–1	10–10				
East Carolina Pirates (NCAA Division I-A independent) (1989–1991)
1989	East Carolina	5–5–1					
1990	East Carolina	5–6					
1991	East Carolina	11–1			W Peach	9	9
East Carolina:		21–12–1					
Georgia Tech Yellow Jackets (Atlantic Coast Conference) (1992–1994)
1992	Georgia Tech	5–6	4–4	T–4th			
1993	Georgia Tech	5–6	3–5	6th			
1994	Georgia Tech	1–7	0–6				
Georgia Tech:		11–19	7–15				
Total:		45–52–2					
^{#}Rankings from final Coaches Poll.; ^{°}Rankings from final AP Poll.
