= Clifton Abraham =

American gridiron football player (born 1971)

No. 26, 48, 24, 3, 10, 26
- Position: Defensive back

Personal information
- Born: December 9, 1971 (age 54); Dallas, Texas, U.S.
- Listed height: 5 ft 9 in (1.75 m)
- Listed weight: 184 lb (83 kg)

Career information
- High school: Dallas Carter
- College: Florida State
- NFL draft: 1995: 5th round, 143rd overall pick

Career history
- Tampa Bay Buccaneers (1995); Chicago Bears (1996); Carolina Panthers (1997); Toronto Argonauts (1998–1999); Los Angeles Xtreme (2001); Toronto Argonauts (2001)

Awards and highlights
- National champion (1993); Consensus All-American (1994); 2× First-team All-ACC (1993, 1994)

Career NFL statistics
- Total tackles: 3
- Stats at Pro Football Reference

Clifton Eugene Abraham Jr. (born December 9, 1971) is an American former professional football player who was a defensive back in the National Football League (NFL) for three seasons. He played college football for the Florida State Seminoles, earning All-American honors in 1994. He played professionally for the Tampa Bay Buccaneers, Chicago Bears and Carolina Panthers of the NFL. Abraham also played for the Toronto Argonauts of the Canadian Football League.

== Early life ==
Abraham was born in Dallas, Texas. He attended David W. Carter High School in Dallas, where he played for the Carter Cowboys high school football team.

== College career ==
While attending Florida State University, Abraham played for the Florida State Seminoles football team from 1991 to 1994. As a junior, he received honorable mention All-American recognition from United Press International in 1993. As a senior in 1994, he was recognized as a consensus first-team All-American, having received first-team honors from the American Football Coaches Association, the Associated Press, College Football News, The Sporting News, United Press International and the Walter Camp Foundation.

== Professional career ==
The Tampa Bay Buccaneers selected Abraham in the fifth round (143rd overall pick) of the 1995 NFL Draft. He played for the Buccaneers for a single season in 1995. He also played for the Chicago Bears in 1996 and the Carolina Panthers in 1997. In three NFL seasons, he appeared in nine regular season games.

Abraham was later signed by the Toronto Argonauts of the Canadian Football League, and he played for that organization for three seasons from 1998 to 1999 and 2001. Appearing in a total of 21 games, Abraham recorded 58 tackles, 13 pass deflections, two interceptions for 48 yards, and one fumble recovery. He was most successful in 1998 when he played in only 10 games but made 35 tackles.

He finished his professional football career with the Los Angeles Xtreme of the XFL in 2001.
