= 1993 NC State Wolfpack football team =

American college football season

1993 NC State Wolfpack football

Hall of Fame Bowl, L 42–7 vs. Michigan
- Conference: Atlantic Coast Conference
- Record: 7–5 (4–4 ACC)
- Head coach: Mike O'Cain (1st season)
- Offensive coordinator: Ted Cain (8th season)
- Defensive coordinator: Buddy Green (4th season)
- Home stadium: Carter–Finley Stadium

1993 Atlantic Coast Conference football standings
	Conf.			Overall
Team	W		L	W		L
No. 1 Florida State $	8	–	0	12	–	1
No. 19 North Carolina	6	–	2	10	–	3
No. 23 Clemson	5	–	3	9	–	3
Virginia	5	–	3	7	–	5
NC State	4	–	4	7	–	5
Georgia Tech	3	–	5	5	–	6
Duke	2	–	6	3	–	8
Maryland	2	–	6	2	–	9
Wake Forest	1	–	7	2	–	9
$ – Conference champion; Rankings from AP Poll

The 1993 NC State Wolfpack football team represented North Carolina State University during the 1993 NCAA Division I-A football season. The team's head coach was Mike O'Cain. NC State has been a member of the Atlantic Coast Conference (ACC) since the league's inception in 1953. The Wolfpack played its home games in 1993 at Carter–Finley Stadium in Raleigh, North Carolina, which has been NC State football's home stadium since 1966.

== Schedule ==
Date	Time	Opponent	Rank	Site	TV	Result	Attendance	Source
September 4	6:00 p.m.	Purdue*	No. 24	Carter–Finley Stadium; Raleigh, NC		W 20–7	41,904	
September 11	6:30 p.m.	at Wake Forest	No. 18	Groves Stadium; Winston-Salem, NC (rivalry)		W 34–16	25,142	
September 25	12:00 p.m.	No. 18 North Carolina	No. 19	Carter–Finley Stadium; Raleigh, NC (rivalry)	JPS	L 14–35	54,400	
October 2	12:00 p.m.	at Clemson	No. 24	Memorial Stadium; Clemson, SoC (Textile Bowl)	JPS	L 14–20	69,637	
October 9	2:00 p.m.	at Texas Tech*		Jones Stadium; Lubbock, TX		W 36–34	26,943	
October 16		No. 3 (I-AA) Marshall*		Carter–Finley Stadium; Raleigh, NC		W 24–17	36,016	
October 23		Georgia Tech		Carter–Finley Stadium; Raleigh, NC		W 28–23	40,123	
October 30	1:00 p.m.	No. 16 Virginia		Carter–Finley Stadium; Raleigh, NC		W 34–29	37,600	
November 6		at Duke	No. 22	Wallace Wade Stadium; Durham, NC (rivalry)		L 20–21	15,200	
November 13		Maryland		Carter–Finley Stadium; Raleigh, NC		W 44–21	35,120	
November 20	7:30 p.m.	at No. 2 Florida State		Doak Campbell Stadium; Tallahassee, FL	ESPN	L 3–62	73,123	
January 1	11:00 a.m.	vs. No. 23 Michigan*		Tampa Stadium; Tampa, FL (Hall of Fame Bowl)	ESPN	L 7–42	52,649	
*Non-conference game; Rankings from AP Poll released prior to the game; All times are in Eastern time

== Team players drafted into the NFL ==
Player	Position	Round	Pick	NFL club
Dewayne Washington	Defensive back	1	18	Minnesota Vikings
Gary Downs	Running back	3	95	New York Giants
George Hegamin	Offensive tackle	3	102	Dallas Cowboys
