= 1993 Clemson Tigers football team =

American college football season

1993 Clemson Tigers football

Peach Bowl champion

Peach Bowl, W 14–13 vs. Kentucky
- Conference: Atlantic Coast Conference

Ranking
- Coaches: No. 22
- AP: No. 23
- Record: 9–3 (5–3 ACC)
- Head coach: Ken Hatfield (4th season; regular season); Tommy West (bowl game)
- Offensive coordinator: Whitey Jordan (3rd season)
- Defensive coordinator: Bobby Johnson (1st season)
- Captain: Richard Moncrief
- Home stadium: Memorial Stadium

1993 Atlantic Coast Conference football standings
	Conf.			Overall
Team	W		L	W		L
No. 1 Florida State $	8	–	0	12	–	1
No. 19 North Carolina	6	–	2	10	–	3
No. 23 Clemson	5	–	3	9	–	3
Virginia	5	–	3	7	–	5
NC State	4	–	4	7	–	5
Georgia Tech	3	–	5	5	–	6
Duke	2	–	6	3	–	8
Maryland	2	–	6	2	–	9
Wake Forest	1	–	7	2	–	9
$ – Conference champion; Rankings from AP Poll

The 1993 Clemson Tigers football team represented Clemson University as a member of the Atlantic Coast Conference (ACC) during the 1993 NCAA Division I-A football season. Led by fourth-year head coach Ken Hatfield, the Tigers compiled an overall record of 9–3 with a mark of 5–3 in conference play, and finished tied for third in the ACC. Clemson played home games at Memorial Stadium in Clemson, South Carolina. Tommy West coached the team in the Peach Bowl after he was hired after the resignation of Hatfield.

== Schedule ==
Date	Time	Opponent	Rank	Site	TV	Result	Attendance	Source
September 4	1:00 p.m.	UNLV*	No. 22	Memorial Stadium; Clemson, SC		W 24–14	65,426	
September 11	12:00 p.m.	at No. 1 Florida State	No. 22	Doak Campbell Stadium; Tallahassee, FL (rivalry)	JPS	L 0–57	74,991	
September 25	1:00 p.m.	Georgia Tech		Memorial Stadium; Clemson, SC (rivalry)		W 16–13	72,511	
October 2	12:00 p.m.	No. 24 NC State		Memorial Stadium; Clemson, SC (Textile Bowl)	JPS	W 20–14	69,637	
October 9	1:30 p.m.	at Duke		Wallace Wade Stadium; Durham, NC		W 13–10	18,600	
October 16	12:00 p.m.	Wake Forest		Memorial Stadium; Clemson, SC	JPS	L 16–20	61,102	
October 23	1:00 p.m.	East Tennessee State*^{†}		Memorial Stadium; Clemson, SC		W 27–0	66,672	
October 30	12:00 p.m.	Maryland		Memorial Stadium; Clemson, SC	JPS	W 29–0	66,147	
November 6	7:30 p.m.	at No. 16 North Carolina		Kenan Memorial Stadium; Chapel Hill, NC	ESPN	L 0–24	51,500	
November 13	12:00 p.m.	No. 18 Virginia		Memorial Stadium; Clemson, SC	JPS	W 23–14	66,419	
November 20	12:30 p.m.	at South Carolina*	No. 24	Williams–Brice Stadium; Columbia, SC (rivalry)	JPS	W 16–13	72,928	
December 31	6:00 p.m.	vs. Kentucky*	No. 23	Georgia Dome; Atlanta, GA (Peach Bowl)	ESPN	W 14–13	63,416	
*Non-conference game; ^{†}Homecoming; Rankings from AP Poll released prior to the game; All times are in Eastern time

== Roster ==
1993 Clemson Tigers football team roster
Players
Coaches
Offense

Pos.	#	Name	Class
FB	18	Emory Smith	Fr
RB	31	Derrick Witherspoon	Sr

Defense

Pos.	#	Name	Class
S	20	Brian Dawkins	So
DT	89	Brentson Buckner	Sr

Special teams

Pos.	#	Name	Class
P/K	02	Nelson Welch	Sr

Head coach

- Ken Hatfield

Coordinators/assistant coaches

Legend

- (C) Team captain
- (S) Suspended
- (I) Ineligible
- Injured
- Redshirt

Roster
