= Corey Holliday =

American football player (born 1971)

No. 83
- Position: Wide receiver

Personal information
- Born: January 31, 1971 (age 55); Richmond, Virginia, U.S.
- Listed height: 6 ft 2 in (1.88 m)
- Listed weight: 208 lb (94 kg)

Career information
- High school: Huguenot (Richmond)
- College: North Carolina
- NFL draft: 1994: undrafted

Career history
- Pittsburgh Steelers (1994–1997)

Awards and highlights
- 2× Second-team All-ACC (1991, 1993)

Career NFL statistics
- Receptions: 1
- Receiving yards: 7
- Stats at Pro Football Reference

Corey Lamont Holliday (born January 31, 1971) is an American former professional football player who was a wide receiver for three seasons with the Pittsburgh Steelers of the National Football League (NFL). He played in Super Bowl XXX against the Dallas Cowboys and had two receptions for 19 yards. He played college football for the North Carolina Tar Heels.
