= 1993 Wake Forest Demon Deacons football team =

American college football season

1993 Wake Forest Demon Deacons football
- Conference: Atlantic Coast Conference
- Record: 2–9 (1–7 ACC)
- Head coach: Jim Caldwell (1st season)
- Offensive coordinator: Alex Wood (1st season)
- Offensive scheme: Pro-style
- Defensive coordinator: Chris Allen (1st season)
- Base defense: 4–3
- Captains: Jimmy Kemp; John Leach; Dred Booe; Jay Williams
- Home stadium: Groves Stadium

1993 Atlantic Coast Conference football standings
	Conf.			Overall
Team	W		L	W		L
No. 1 Florida State $	8	–	0	12	–	1
No. 19 North Carolina	6	–	2	10	–	3
No. 23 Clemson	5	–	3	9	–	3
Virginia	5	–	3	7	–	5
NC State	4	–	4	7	–	5
Georgia Tech	3	–	5	5	–	6
Duke	2	–	6	3	–	8
Maryland	2	–	6	2	–	9
Wake Forest	1	–	7	2	–	9
$ – Conference champion; Rankings from AP Poll

The 1993 Wake Forest Demon Deacons football team was an American football team that represented Wake Forest University during the 1993 NCAA Division I-A football season. In their first season under head coach Jim Caldwell, the Demon Deacons compiled a 2–9 record and finished in last place in the Atlantic Coast Conference.

== Schedule ==
Date	Time	Opponent	Site	TV	Result	Attendance	Source
September 4	6:30 pm	Vanderbilt*	Groves Stadium; Winston-Salem, NC		L 12–27	16,053	
September 11	6:30 pm	NC State	Groves Stadium; Winston-Salem, NC (rivalry)		L 16–34	25,142	
September 18	6:30 pm	Appalachian State*	Groves Stadium; Winston-Salem, NC		W 16–3	26,918	
September 25	2:00 pm	at Northwestern*	Dyche Stadium; Evanston, IL		L 14–26	23,875	
October 9	12:00 pm	at No. 15 North Carolina	Kenan Memorial Stadium; Chapel Hill, NC (rivalry)	JPS	L 35–45	51,000	
October 16	1:00 pm	at Clemson	Memorial Stadium; Clemson, SC		W 20–16	61,102	
October 23	1:00 pm	Duke	Groves Stadium; Winston-Salem, NC (rivalry)		L 13–21	20,123	
October 30	2:00 pm	at No. 1 Florida State	Doak Campbell Stadium; Tallahassee, FL		L 0–54	66,666	
November 6	1:00 pm	at No. 21 Virginia	Scott Stadium; Charlottesville, VA		L 9–21	36,700	
November 13	12:00 pm	Georgia Tech	Groves Stadium; Winston-Salem, NC	JPS	L 28–38	21,113	
November 20	1:00 pm	Maryland	Groves Stadium; Winston-Salem, NC		L 32–33	12,521	
*Non-conference game; Rankings from AP Poll released prior to the game; All times are in Eastern time

== Team leaders ==
Category	Team Leader	Att/Cth	Yds
Passing	Jim Kemp	126/217	1,488
Rushing	John Lewis	215	1,675
Receiving	John Leach	41	340
