= 1993 Florida State Seminoles football team =

American college football season

1993 Florida State Seminoles football

Consensus national champion ACC champion Orange Bowl champion

Orange Bowl (BC NCG), W 18–16 vs. Nebraska
- Conference: Atlantic Coast Conference

Ranking
- Coaches: No. 1
- AP: No. 1
- Record: 12–1 (8–0 ACC)
- Head coach: Bobby Bowden (18th season)
- Offensive coordinator: Brad Scott (4th season)
- Offensive scheme: No-huddle spread
- Defensive coordinator: Mickey Andrews (10th season)
- Base defense: 4–3
- Captains: Ken Alexander; Matt Frier; Lonnie Johnson; Charlie Ward
- Home stadium: Doak Campbell Stadium

1993 Atlantic Coast Conference football standings
	Conf.			Overall
Team	W		L	W		L
No. 1 Florida State $	8	–	0	12	–	1
No. 19 North Carolina	6	–	2	10	–	3
No. 23 Clemson	5	–	3	9	–	3
Virginia	5	–	3	7	–	5
NC State	4	–	4	7	–	5
Georgia Tech	3	–	5	5	–	6
Duke	2	–	6	3	–	8
Maryland	2	–	6	2	–	9
Wake Forest	1	–	7	2	–	9
$ – Conference champion; Rankings from AP Poll

The 1993 Florida State Seminoles football team represented Florida State University as a member of the Atlantic Coast Conference (ACC) during the 1993 NCAA Division I-A football season. Led by 18th-year head coach Bobby Bowden, the Seminoles compiled an overall record of 12–1 with a mark of 8–0 in conference play, winning the ACC title for the second consecutive season. Florida State was invited to the Orange Bowl, the Bowl Coalition's national championship game, where the Seminoles defeated Nebraska to capture the program’s first consensus College football national championships in NCAA Division I FBS. The team played home games at Doak Campbell Stadium in Tallahassee, Florida

Quarterback Charlie Ward became the first Florida State player to win the Heisman Trophy, as college football's most outstanding player. Ward, who threw for 3,032 yards and completed 70 percent of his passes, became the first player to win the Heisman Trophy and the national championship in the same season since Pittsburgh's Tony Dorsett in 1976. The Seminoles topped college football in both scoring defense and scoring offense, with its offense scoring an average of 43.2 points a game and the defense giving up an average of 9.4 points per game.

== Schedule ==
Date	Time	Opponent	Rank	Site	TV	Result	Attendance	Source
August 28	12:00 p.m.	vs. Kansas*	No. 1	Giants Stadium; East Rutherford, NJ (Kickoff Classic)	ABC	W 42–0	51,734	
September 4	7:00 p.m.	at Duke	No. 1	Wallace Wade Stadium; Durham, NC	PPV	W 45–7	26,800	
September 11	12:00 p.m.	No. 21 Clemson	No. 1	Doak Campbell Stadium; Tallahassee, FL (rivalry)	JPS	W 57–0	74,991	
September 18	7:30 p.m.	at No. 13 North Carolina	No. 1	Kenan Memorial Stadium; Chapel Hill, NC	ESPN	W 33–7	54,100	
October 2	12:00 p.m.	Georgia Tech	No. 1	Doak Campbell Stadium; Tallahassee, FL	ABC	W 51–0	74,611	
October 9	12:00 p.m.	No. 3 Miami (FL)*	No. 1	Doak Campbell Stadium; Tallahassee, FL (rivalry)	ABC	W 28–10	77,813	
October 16	4:00 p.m.	No. 15 Virginia	No. 1	Doak Campbell Stadium; Tallahassee, FL (Jefferson–Eppes Trophy)	ESPN	W 40–14	76,607	
October 30	2:00 p.m.	Wake Forest	No. 1	Doak Campbell Stadium; Tallahassee, FL		W 55–0	66,666	
November 6	12:00 p.m.	at Maryland	No. 1	Byrd Stadium; College Park, MD	JPS	W 49–20	36,255	
November 13	1:30 p.m.	at No. 2 Notre Dame*	No. 1	Notre Dame Stadium; Notre Dame, IN (rivalry, College GameDay)	NBC	L 24–31	59,075	
November 20	7:30 p.m.	NC State	No. 2	Doak Campbell Stadium; Tallahassee, FL	ESPN	W 62–3	73,123	
November 27	12:00 p.m.	at No. 7 Florida*	No. 1	Ben Hill Griffin Stadium; Gainesville, FL (rivalry)	ABC	W 33–21	85,507	
January 1	8:00 p.m.	vs. No. 2 Nebraska*	No. 1	Miami Orange Bowl; Miami, FL (Orange Bowl)	NBC	W 18–16	81,536	
*Non-conference game; Rankings from AP Poll released prior to the game; All times are in Eastern time; Source:

== Rankings ==
Ranking movements Legend: ██ Increase in ranking ██ Decrease in ranking ( ) = First-place votes
	Week																
Poll	Pre	1	2	3	4	5	6	7	8	9	10	11	12	13	14	15	Final
AP	1 (42)	1 (47)	1 (50)	1 (59)	1 (57)	1 (58)	1 (61)	1 (61)	1 (62)	1 (62)	1 (62)	1 (62)	2	1 (33)	1 (42)	1 (42)	1 (46)
Coaches	1 (47)	1 (54)	1 (56)	1 (59)	1 (59)	1 (58)	1 (57)	1 (58)	1 (59)	1 (59)	1 (59)	1 (60)	3	2 (11)	3 (10)	3 (13)	1 (36)

== Season summary ==
FSU beat its first five opponents by an average score of 46–3, during which linebacker Derrick Brooks outscored the Noles' first five opponents combined. These victories included a 57-0 win over #17 Clemson and a 33-7 win over #13 North Carolina. The Seminoles' first competitive contest didn't come until October 9, when the third-ranked Miami Hurricanes came to Tallahassee with a 31-game regular season win streak. That game was sealed when FSU safety Devin Bush picked off a Frank Costa pass and ran it back 40 yards for a Florida State touchdown, making the score 28–10 with 4:59 to play.

On November 13, 1993, Florida State played Notre Dame in a matchup of unbeaten teams in an away game at Notre Dame Stadium, on a day where 20 mph winds created extra adversity for the pass-happy Noles. FSU was ranked #1 and Notre Dame was ranked #2. In a matchup hailed as the "Game of the Century", the Seminoles' bid for a perfect season fell short as Notre Dame prevailed, 31–24. The Irish had leads of 24–7 and 31–17 before the Seminoles scored late to cut the final margin to seven. The Noles then regained possession at their own 37-yard line with just 51 seconds left in the game. Three consecutive passes by Ward quickly led Florida State to the Notre Dame 14. On the last play of the game, Ward rolled out and had his pass attempt batted down in the end zone, leaving the Irish with a 31–24 victory. After that game, Notre Dame was voted #1 and FSU was voted #2.

The following week, #1 Notre Dame lost at home to #17 Boston College 41–39 on a 41-yard field goal as time expired, while the Seminoles beat NC State 62–3. The voters returned the Seminoles to the #1 spot in the AP poll, and they rose to #2 in the coaches' poll while Notre Dame fell to a ranking of fourth in both polls. The week afterwards, FSU travelled to Gainesville to face the 7th-ranked Florida Gators -- that season's SEC champions -- and defeated them 33–21. FSU finished the regular season #1 and was matched against #2 Nebraska in the Orange Bowl. In a hard-fought contest, Florida State rallied late to defeat Nebraska 18–16 after the Cornhuskers tried and missed a 45-yard field goal on the game's final play. After the bowl games, 12–1 Florida State was voted #1 in both polls, while 11–1 Notre Dame fell to #2 and 11-1 Nebraska dropped to 3rd in the polls respectively.

During the 1993 season, the Seminoles faced four teams in the top seven of the AP rankings when FSU played them -- #3 Miami in week 6, #2 Notre Dame in week 11, #7 Florida in week 13, and #2 Nebraska in the Orange Bowl -- and they went 3–1 against those teams, while playing only one home game in those four contests. The Noles also defeated three other top 25 teams that filled out their schedule, with Clemson ranked 17th, North Carolina ranked 13th, and Virginia ranked 15th when the Noles played them. By the end of season, FSU had faced six of the teams in the final AP top 25 poll, going 5-1 against them. These teams were #2 Notre Dame, #3 Nebraska, #5 Florida, #15 Miami, #19 North Carolina, and #23 Clemson. By the end of Notre Dame's season, the Irish had faced two teams ranked in the final AP top 25: #1 Florida State and #19 Michigan. In their Cotton Bowl meeting with #7 Texas A&M, Notre Dame won 24–21.

== Game summaries ==
=== Miami (FL) ===
No. 3 Miami (FL) Hurricanes (4–0) at No. 1 Florida State Seminoles (5–0)

Quarter	1	2	3	4	Total
Miami (FL)	7	0	0	3	10
Florida State	14	7	0	7	28

at Doak Campbell Stadium, Tallahassee, Florida

- Date: October 9
- Game time: 12:00 p.m. EST
- Game weather: Partly cloudy, 74 °F (23 °C)
- Game attendance: 77,813
- Referee: John Soffey
- TV: ABC
- Box Score

Game information

First quarter

- FSU – Sean Jackson 69-yard run (Scott Bentley kick), 11:17. Florida St 7–0. Drive: 3 plays, 80 yards, 1:04.
- MIA – Donnell Bennett 6-yard pass from Frank Costa (Dane Prewitt kick), 4:09. Tie 7–7. Drive: 9 plays, 80 yards, 4:36.
- FSU – Matt Frier 72-yard pass from Charlie Ward (Scott Bentley kick), 2:46. Florida St 14–7. Drive: 3 plays, 72 yards, 1:23.

Second quarter

- FSU – Charlie Ward 2-yard run (Scott Bentley kick), 13:37. Florida St 21–7. Drive: 8 plays, 59 yards, 2:56.

Third quarter

- No scoring

Fourth quarter

- MIA – Dane Prewitt 23-yard field goal, 14:07. Florida St 21–10. Drive: 16 plays, 74 yards, 8:06.
- FSU – Devin Bush 40-yard interception return (Scott Bentley kick), 4:59. Florida St 28–10.

Top passers

- MIA – Frank Costa – 21/43, 193 yards, TD, INT
- FSU – Charlie Ward – 21/31, 256 yards, TD

Top rushers

- MIA – Donnell Bennett – 21 rushes, 75 yards
- FSU – Sean Jackson – 10 rushes, 98 yards, TD

Top receivers

- MIA – C.T. Jones – 7 receptions, 86 yards
- FSU – Matt Frier – 2 receptions, 81 yards, TD

=== At Notre Dame ===
Florida State at Notre Dame

Team	1	2	3	4	Total
No. 1 Seminoles	7	0	7	10	24
• No. 2 Fighting Irish	7	14	3	7	31

- Date: November 13
- Location: Notre Dame Stadium, Notre Dame, Indiana
- Game start: Kickoff 1:47pm EST
- Game attendance: 59,075
- Game weather: pregame showers, temp near 60, wind from south 20 to 30 mph
- TV announcers (NBC): Charlie Jones, Todd Christensen, Bob Costas (studio host), John Dockery (sideline) and O. J. Simpson (sideline)

=== At Florida ===
No. 1 Florida State Seminoles (10–1) at No. 7 Florida Gators (9–1)

Quarter	1	2	3	4	Total
Florida State	7	6	14	6	33
Florida	0	7	0	14	21

at Ben Hill Griffith Stadium, Gainesville, Florida

- Date: November 27
- Game time: 12:00 p.m. EST
- Game weather: Cloudy, 75 °F (24 °C)
- Game attendance: 85,507
- Referee: Dayle Phillips
- TV: ABC
- Box Score

Game information

First quarter

- FSU – Tamarick Vanover 5-yard pass from Charlie Ward (Scott Bentley kick), 14:57. Florida St 7–0. Drive: 11 plays, 57 yards, 4:04.

Second quarter

- FSU – Scott Bentley 23-yard field goal, 14:57. Florida St 10–0. Drive: 13 plays, 72 yards, 5:39.
- FSU – Scott Bentley 22-yard field goal, 7:20. Florida St 13–0. Drive: 14 plays, 70 yards, 5:30.
- UF – Willie Jackson 11-yard pass from Danny Wuerffel (Judd Davis kick), 4:41. Florida St 13–7. Drive: 7 plays, 65 yards, 2:39.

Third quarter

- FSU – Kez McCorvey 7-yard pass from Charlie Ward (Scott Bentley kick), 11:27. Florida St 20–7. Drive: 10 plays, 65 yards, 3:53.
- FSU – Kez McCorvey 16-yard pass from Charlie Ward (Scott Bentley kick), 0:21. Florida St 27–7. Drive: 3 plays, 35 yards, 0:55.

Fourth quarter

- UF – Willie Jackson 13-yard pass from Terry Dean (Judd Davis kick), 11:48. Florida St 27–14. Drive: 11 plays, 65 yards, 3:33.
- UF – Jack Jackson 31-yard pass from Terry Dean (Judd Davis kick), 5:58. Florida St 27–21. Drive: 11 plays, 94 yards, 2:44.
- FSU – Warrick Dunn 79-yard pass from Charlie Ward (pass failed), 5:28. Florida St 33–21. Drive: 3 plays, 79 yards, 0:30.

Top passers

- FSU – Charlie Ward – 38/53, 446 yards, 4 TD, 2 INT
- UF – Terry Dean – 14/33, 259 yards, 2 TD, 2 INT

Top rushers

- FSU – Sean Jackson – 19 rushes, 48 yards
- UF – Errict Rhett – 7 rushes, 7 yards

Top receivers

- FSU – Warrick Dunn – 8 receptions, 140 yards, TD
- UF – Willie Jackson – 7 receptions, 140 yards, 2 TD

=== Vs. Nebraska—Orange Bowl ===
Florida State vs Nebraska

Team	1	2	3	4	Total
• No. 1 Seminoles	0	6	9	3	18
No. 2 Cornhuskers	0	7	0	9	16

- Date: January 1
- Location: Miami Orange Bowl, Miami
- Game attendance: 81,536
- Referee: John Soffey
- TV announcers (NBC): Dick Enberg, Bob Trumpy and O. J. Simpson

Scoring summary
Q2	7:54	FSU	Scott Bentley 34-yard field goal	FSU 3–0
Q2	5:59	Neb	Reggie Baul 34-yard pass from Tommie Frazier (Byron Bennett kick)	Neb 7–3
Q2	0:29	FSU	Scott Bentley 25-yard field goal	Neb 7–6
Q3	12:50	FSU	William Floyd 1-yard run (pass failed)	FSU 12–7
Q3	3:06	FSU	Scott Bentley 39-yard field goal	FSU 15–7
Q4	14:55	Neb	Lawrence Phillips 12-yard run (run failed)	FSU 15–13
Q4	1:16	Neb	Byron Bennett 27-yard field goal	Neb 16–15
Q4	0:21	FSU	Scott Bentley 22-yard field goal	FSU 18–16

== Personnel ==
=== Roster ===
1993 Florida State Seminoles football team roster
Players
Coaches
Offense

Pos.	#	Name	Class
RB	20	Clyde Allen	Sr
FB	32	Zack Crockett	Sr
WR	30	'Omar Ellison	Jr
RT	60	Marvin Ferrell	Sr
FB	44	William Floyd	Sr
QB	13	Danny Kanell	So
OL	51	Kevin Long	Fr
G	69	Patrick McNeil	Jr
WR	15	Phillip Riley	So
C	53	Clay Shiver	So
QB	5	Jon Stark	So
WR	80	Tamarick Vanover	So
QB	17	Charlie Ward	Sr
WR	6	Harold Wright	So

Defense

Pos.	#	Name	Class
CB	2	Clifton Abraham	Jr
DE	90	Derrick Alexander	So
ILB	36	Ken Alexander	Sr
ILB	54	Rick Anteau	Fr
DB	11	Devin Bush Sr.	So
LB	10	Derrick Brooks	Jr
ILB	45	Henri Crockett	Fr
CB	21	James Colzie	Fr
CB	4	Corey Fuller	Jr
S	38	Dan LaRose	Jr
DE	94	Toddrick McIntosh	Sr
DE	92	Gerald Owens	Jr
ILB	39	Melvin Pearsall	Fr
DE	95	Julian Pittman	Fr
CB	8	Corey Sawyer	Jr

Special teams

Pos.	#	Name	Class
K	3	Scott Bentley	Fr

Head coach

- Bobby Bowden

Coordinators/assistant coaches

Legend

- (C) Team captain
- (S) Suspended
- (I) Ineligible
- Injured
- Redshirt

=== Starting lineup ===
==== Offense ====
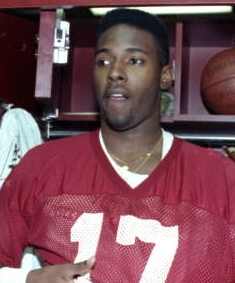
Heisman winner Charlie Ward

Pos	Number	Name	Class
QB	17	Charlie Ward	SR
RB	35	Sean Jackson	SR
FB	44	William Floyd	SR
WR	80	Tamarick Vanover	SO
WR	88	Kez McCorvey	JR
WR	12	Matt Frier	SR
LT	67	Juan Laureano	SO
LG	66	Lewis Tyre	SO
C	53	Clay Shiver	SO
RG	69	Patrick McNeil	JR
RT	79	Forrest Conoly	JR

==== Defense ====
Pos	Number	Name	Class
LB	10	Derrick Brooks	JR
LB	37	Todd Rebol	SO
LB	36	Ken Alexander	SR
DE	94	Toddrick McIntosh	SR
DE	90	Derrick Alexander	SO
NG	57	John Nance	SR
CB	2	Clifton Abraham	JR
CB	8	Corey Sawyer	JR
FS	16	Richard Coes	SR
SS	11	Devin Bush	SO

=== Special teams ===
Pos	Number	Name	Class
K	3	Scott Bentley	FR
P	29	Sean Liss	FR
KR			
PR			

== Awards and honors ==
- Charlie Ward, Heisman Trophy
- Charlie Ward, Johnny Unitas Award
- Charlie Ward, James E. Sullivan Award
- Charlie Ward, Walter Camp Award
- Charlie Ward, Maxwell Award
- Charlie Ward, Davey O'Brien Award

== 1993 team players in the NFL ==
The following were selected in the 1994 NFL draft.

Player	Position	Round	Overall	NFL team
William Floyd	Running back	1	28	San Francisco 49ers
Lonnie Johnson	Tight end	2	61	Buffalo Bills
Corey Sawyer	Defensive back	4	104	Cincinnati Bengals
Sean Jackson	Running back	4	129	Houston Oilers
Kevin Knox	Wide receiver	6	192	Buffalo Bills
Toddrick McIntosh	Defensive tackle	7	216	Dallas Cowboys

The following played in the NFL in later years:

- Derrick Brooks
- Sam Cowart
- Kez McCorvey
- Warrick Dunn
- Derrick Alexander
- Tamarick Vanover
- Clay Shiver
- Danny Kanell
