= 1994 Orange Bowl =

1994 Federal Express Orange Bowl
- Bowl Coalition National Championship Game; 60th Orange Bowl
- The Miami Orange Bowl in Miami, Florida, hosted the Orange Bowl.
Florida State Seminoles	Nebraska Cornhuskers
(11–1)	(11–0)
ACC	Big Eight
18	16
Head coach: Bobby Bowden	Head coach: Tom Osborne
AP / Coaches / BC; 1 / 3 / 2	AP / Coaches / BC; 2 / 1 / 1
	1	2	3	4	Total
Florida State	0	6	9	3	18
Nebraska	0	7	0	9	16
- Date: January 1, 1994
- Season: 1993
- Stadium: Miami Orange Bowl
- Location: Miami, Florida
- MVP: Nebraska QB Tommie Frazier and FSU QB Charlie Ward
- Favorite: Florida State by 16½ (50.5)
- Referee: John Soffey (Big East)
- Attendance: 81,536

United States TV coverage
- Network: NBC
- Announcers: Dick Enberg, Bob Trumpy and O. J. Simpson
- Nielsen ratings: 18.0

The 1994 Orange Bowl was a college football bowl game played on January 1, 1994. The contest was the Bowl Coalition National Championship Game for the 1993 NCAA Division I-A football season. This 60th edition to the Orange Bowl featured the Nebraska Cornhuskers of the Big Eight Conference and the Florida State Seminoles of the Atlantic Coast Conference. Florida State narrowly prevailed over the Cornhuskers to win their first national championship in program history.

== Teams ==
=== Nebraska Cornhuskers ===
Nebraska came into the game undefeated at 11–0 and with a number 2 ranking. Despite their unbeaten record, the Huskers were underdogs by as much as 17½ points before the game.

=== Florida State Seminoles ===
Florida State came into the game 11–1 and ranked first in the nation.

== Game summary ==
The first quarter of play featured great defense, as no points were scored, though Nebraska had an apparent touchdown on a punt return called back due to a clip, but replay shows there was no illegal block on the play. Florida State's Scott Bentley provided the first points of the contest, after he kicked a 33-yard field goal to open up a 3–0 lead. Nebraska quarterback Tommie Frazier got the Huskers back on track, after he fired an errant pass that was tipped into the hands of wide receiver Reggie Baul. The touchdown gave Nebraska a 7–3 lead. With only 29 seconds left in the first half, Bentley drilled a 25-yard field goal to bring the Seminoles to 7–6, which was the halftime score.

With 12:30 left in the third quarter, Florida State's running back William Floyd gave the Seminoles a 12–7 lead when he scored on a 1-yard touchdown run. He fumbled at the goal line but refs were quick to call without discussion. Replay showed he crossed the goal line before losing the football. Florida State went for two on the ensuing PAT, but failed, and the score remained 12–7. Later in the third, FSU added another Bentley field goal to increase the lead to eight.

At the start of the fourth quarter, Nebraska running back Lawrence Phillips scored on a 12-yard touchdown run. The Huskers attempted a two-point conversion which would have tied the game, but failed, and trailed 15–13. The Huskers held the Seminoles and took over the ball late, driving to the FSU 10-yard line before stalling. Byron Bennett kicked a 27-yard field goal with just 1:16 remaining on the clock to give the Huskers a slim 16–15 lead.

Aided by a kickoff out of bounds, FSU took over with excellent field position at their own 35-yard line. FSU's Heisman Trophy winning quarterback Charlie Ward drove the Seminoles all the way to the Nebraska 3-yard line. The Huskers held and forced Bentley to kick his fourth field goal of the night, which was good, and FSU led 18–16 with just 21 seconds remaining.

Florida State players and coaches went wild on the sidelines, and were penalized for excessive celebration, costing them 15 yards on the ensuing kickoff. As a result, the Huskers were able to get a decent return and began their final possession at their own 43-yard line.

As time ran down, Frazier hit tight end Trumane Bell for a 29-yard gain to the FSU 28-yard line. The clock ticked down to 0:00, setting off more chaos on the FSU sideline, complete with the compulsory Gatorade bath given to FSU coach Bobby Bowden.

However, referee John Soffey ruled that Bell was down with one second left on the clock, and ordered the field cleared, allowing Nebraska placekicker Byron Bennett an opportunity to kick the game-winning field goal. But the 45-yard kick sailed wide left, preserving the 18–16 win for the Seminoles.

== Scoring Summary ==
First quarter

No Scoring

Second quarter

FSU-Scott Bentley 34 yd field goal 7:54 FSU 3 Nebraska 0

Nebraska-Reggie Baul 34 yd td pass from Tommie Frazier (Byron Bennett kick) 5:59 Nebraska 7 FSU 3

FSU- Scott Bentley 25 yd field goal 0:29 Nebraska 7 FSU 6

Third quarter

FSU-William Floyd 1 yd td run (2-pt pass failed) 12:50 FSU 12 Nebraska 7

FSU- Scott Bentley 39 yd field goal 3:06 FSU 15 Nebraska 7

Fourth quarter

Nebraska-Lawrence Phillips 12 yd td run (2-pt run failed) 14:55 FSU 15 Nebraska 13

Nebraska-Byron Bennett 27 yd field goal 1:16 Nebraska 16 FSU 15

FSU-Scott Bentley 22 yd field goal 0:21 FSU 18 Nebraska 16

== Aftermath ==
Florida State had finished the season number 1 in the nation to claim their first national championship, just ahead of the only team to beat them in 1993: Notre Dame. Notre Dame had lost on a last second field goal to #15 Boston College in their last home game of the season, just a week after they defeated the Seminoles. Boston College's triumph opened the door for Florida State to challenge undefeated Nebraska for the national crown. The win was Bowden's first championship, and left Nebraska coach Tom Osborne still searching for his first.

The Huskers had exceeded everyone's expectations by playing the highly favored Seminoles right to the wire, and used the loss as motivation for their 1994 campaign, which was entitled "Unfinished Business". During spring and fall practice prior to the 1994 season, the scoreboard at Nebraska's Memorial Stadium was set to show Nebraska leading Florida State 16–15 with 1:16 remaining on the clock, which was the last point at which Nebraska had taken the lead. Nebraska defeated Miami in the Orange Bowl to win the national championship.

Bowden continued to coach Florida State until the end of the 2009 season when he announced his retirement. He won a second national title in 1999, defeating Virginia Tech in the 2000 Sugar Bowl.

This was the fourth ever matchup in bowl games between these two storied programs (Fiesta in 1988 & 1990 and Orange in 1994). The two have not played each other since (entering the 2026 season).

Florida State capped off this Orange Bowl with their 12th straight bowl game without a loss. They would go on to win their next two bowls in the following seasons. FSU would then make it 14 straight bowls (December 1982 through January 1996) without a loss. Speaking of that magic number 14, FSU went 14 straight seasons finishing in the final AP and or Coaches poll top four (1987–2000). That still to this day, marks the most consecutive seasons finishing in the final top 4 in the history of the AP (1936) and Coaches Poll (1950).
