= 1993 Georgia Tech Yellow Jackets football team =

American college football season

1993 Georgia Tech Yellow Jackets football
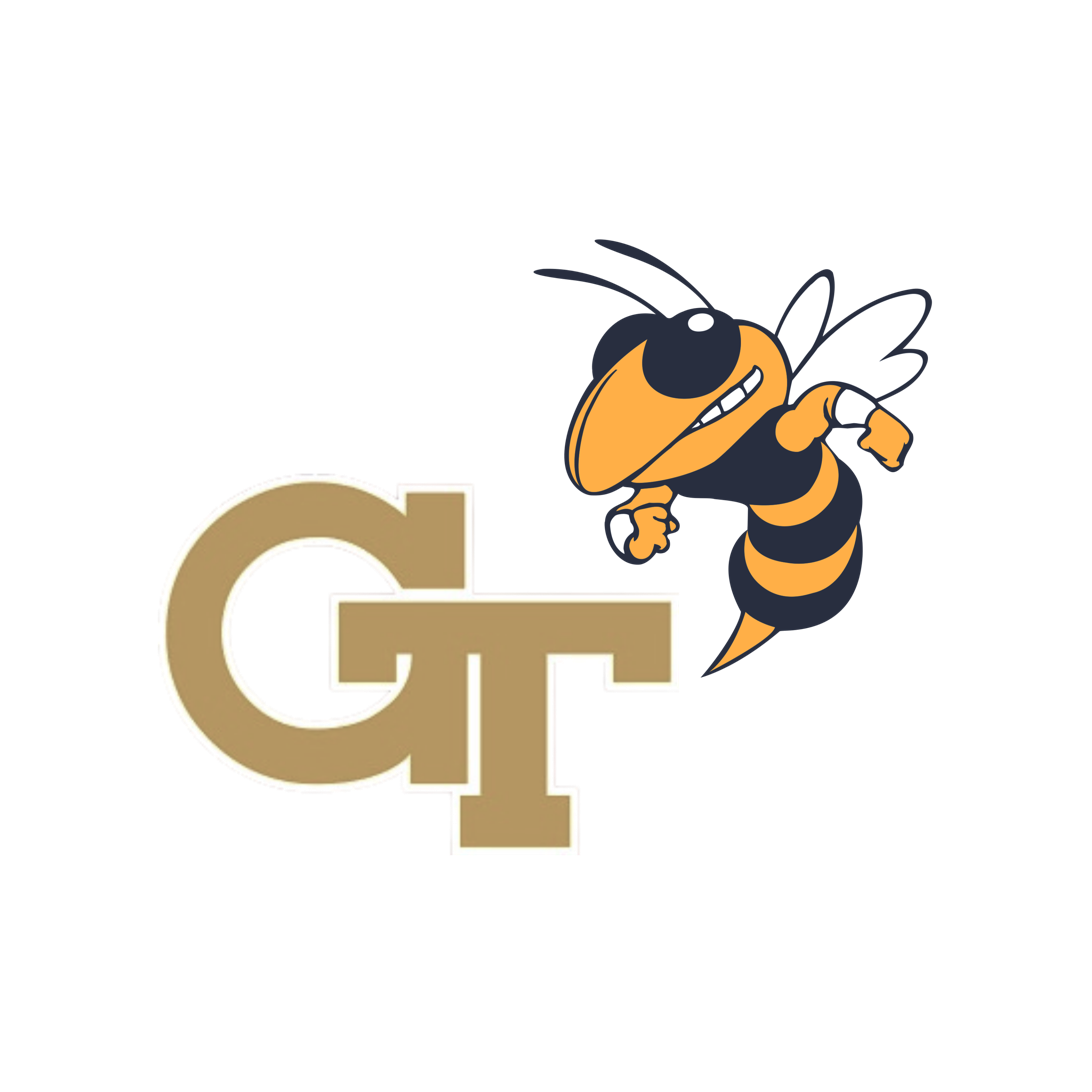
- Conference: Atlantic Coast Conference
- Record: 5–6 (3–5 ACC)
- Head coach: Bill Lewis (2nd season)
- Offensive coordinator: Steve Shankweiler (2nd season)
- Defensive coordinator: Mike Cassity (2nd season)
- Home stadium: Bobby Dodd Stadium

1993 Atlantic Coast Conference football standings
	Conf.			Overall
Team	W		L	W		L
No. 1 Florida State $	8	–	0	12	–	1
No. 19 North Carolina	6	–	2	10	–	3
No. 23 Clemson	5	–	3	9	–	3
Virginia	5	–	3	7	–	5
NC State	4	–	4	7	–	5
Georgia Tech	3	–	5	5	–	6
Duke	2	–	6	3	–	8
Maryland	2	–	6	2	–	9
Wake Forest	1	–	7	2	–	9
$ – Conference champion; Rankings from AP Poll

The 1993 Georgia Tech Yellow Jackets football team represented the Georgia Institute of Technology in the 1993 NCAA Division I-A football season. The Yellow Jackets were led by head coach Bill Lewis. Georgia Tech played its home games at Bobby Dodd Stadium in Atlanta.

== Schedule ==
Date	Time	Opponent	Site	TV	Result	Attendance	Source
September 11		Furman*	Bobby Dodd Stadium; Atlanta, GA		W 37–3	43,200	
September 16		No. 25 Virginia	Bobby Dodd Stadium; Atlanta, GA	ESPN	L 14–35	41,300	
September 25	1:00 pm	at Clemson	Memorial Stadium; Clemson, SC (rivalry)		L 13–16	72,511	
October 2	12:00 pm	at No. 1 Florida State	Doak Campbell Stadium; Tallahassee, FL	ABC	L 0–51	74,611	
October 9		Maryland	Bobby Dodd Stadium; Atlanta, GA		W 38–0	36,218	
October 16	12:00 pm	No. 14 North Carolina	Bobby Dodd Stadium; Atlanta, GA	ABC	L 3–41	39,216	
October 23		at NC State	Carter–Finley Stadium; Raleigh, NC		L 23–28	40,123	
October 30		at Duke	Wallace Wade Stadium; Durham, NC		W 47–14	30,470	
November 6	12:00 pm	Baylor*	Bobby Dodd Stadium; Atlanta, GA		W 37–27	42,175	
November 13	12:00 pm	at Wake Forest	Groves Stadium; Winston-Salem, NC	JPS	W 38–28	21,113	
November 25	11:00 am	Georgia*	Bobby Dodd Stadium; Atlanta, GA (Clean, Old-Fashioned Hate)	ABC	L 10–43	46,018	
*Non-conference game; Rankings from AP Poll released prior to the game; All times are in Eastern time

== Roster ==
1993 Georgia Tech Yellow Jackets football team roster
Players
Coaches
Offense

Pos.	#	Name	Class
RB	36	William Bell	Sr
OT	68	Gary Brown	Sr
C	65	Michael Cheever	So
QB	13	Donnie Davis	So
RB	12	Dorsey Levens	Sr
WR	85	Charlie Simmons	Jr
RB	35	Jeff Wright	Sr

Defense

Pos.	#	Name	Class
CB	22	Marcus Coleman	Sr
S	8	Mike Dee	Fr
CB	4	Lethon Flowers	Jr
DT	99	Elliott Fortune	So
DB	24	Ryan Stewart	So
CB	27	Mike Williams	Sr

Special teams

Pos.	#	Name	Class

Head coach

- Bill Lewis

Coordinators/assistant coaches

Legend

- (C) Team captain
- (S) Suspended
- (I) Ineligible
- Injured
- Redshirt
