= 1993 Virginia Cavaliers football team =

American college football season

1993 Virginia Cavaliers football

Carquest Bowl, L 13–31 vs. Boston College
- Conference: Atlantic Coast Conference
- Record: 7–5 (5–3 ACC)
- Head coach: George Welsh (12th season)
- Offensive coordinator: Tom O'Brien (3rd season)
- Defensive coordinator: Rick Lantz (3rd season)
- Captains: Mark Dixon; Keith Lyle; Greg McClellan; Jerrod Washington
- Home stadium: Scott Stadium

1993 Atlantic Coast Conference football standings
	Conf.			Overall
Team	W		L	W		L
No. 1 Florida State $	8	–	0	12	–	1
No. 19 North Carolina	6	–	2	10	–	3
No. 23 Clemson	5	–	3	9	–	3
Virginia	5	–	3	7	–	5
NC State	4	–	4	7	–	5
Georgia Tech	3	–	5	5	–	6
Duke	2	–	6	3	–	8
Maryland	2	–	6	2	–	9
Wake Forest	1	–	7	2	–	9
$ – Conference champion; Rankings from AP Poll

The 1993 Virginia Cavaliers football team represented the University of Virginia as a member of the Atlantic Coast Conference (ACC) during the 1993 NCAA Division I-A football season. Led by 12th-year head coach George Welsh, the Cavaliers compiled an overall record of 7–5 with a mark of 5–3 in conference play, tying for third place in the ACC. Virginia was invited to the Carquest Bowl, where the Cavaliers lost to Boston College. The team played home games at Scott Stadium in Charlottesville, Virginia.

== Schedule ==
Date	Time	Opponent	Rank	Site	TV	Result	Attendance	Source
September 4	12:00 pm	at Maryland		Byrd Stadium; College Park, MD (rivalry)	JPS	W 43–29	35,015	
September 11	1:00 pm	Navy*		Scott Stadium; Charlottesville, VA		W 38–0	38,900	
September 16	8:00 pm	at Georgia Tech	No. 25	Bobby Dodd Stadium; Atlanta, GA	ESPN	W 35–14	41,300	
September 25	1:00 pm	Duke	No. 22	Scott Stadium; Charlottesville, VA		W 35–0	37,700	
October 2	1:00 pm	Ohio*^{†}	No. 21	Scott Stadium; Charlottesville, VA		W 41–7	36,300	
October 16	4:00 pm	at No. 1 Florida State	No. 15	Doak Campbell Stadium; Tallahassee, FL (Jefferson–Eppes Trophy)	ESPN	L 14–40	76,607	
October 23	3:30 pm	No. 12 North Carolina	No. 21	Scott Stadium; Charlottesville, VA (South's Oldest Rivalry)	ABC	W 17–10	42,300	
October 30	1:00 pm	at NC State	No. 16	Carter–Finley Stadium; Raleigh, NC		L 29–34	37,600	
November 6	1:00 pm	Wake Forest	No. 21	Scott Stadium; Charlottesville, VA		W 21–9	36,700	
November 13	12:00 pm	at Clemson	No. 18	Memorial Stadium; Clemson, SC	JPS	L 14–23	66,419	
November 20	12:00 pm	No. 25 Virginia Tech*	No. 23	Scott Stadium; Charlottesville, VA (rivalry)	JPS	L 17–20	42,100	
January 1	1:00 pm	vs. No. 15 Boston College*		Joe Robbie Stadium; Miami Gardens, FL (Carquest Bowl)	CBS	L 13–31	38,516	
*Non-conference game; ^{†}Homecoming; Rankings from AP Poll released prior to the game

== Roster ==
1993 Virginia Cavaliers football team roster
Players
Coaches
Offense

Pos.	#	Name	Class
QB	1	Symmion Willis
QB	19	Wayne Lineburg	So
FB	30	Charles Way
WR	81	Patrick Jeffers
WR	82	Tyrone Davis

Defense

Pos.	#	Name	Class
DB	25	Keith Lyle
DB	27	Percy Ellsworth
LB	33	Jamie Sharper
DE, DT	99	Ryan Kuehl	Jr

Special teams

Pos.	#	Name	Class
K	5	Charles Fiveash	Sr

Head coach

- George Welsh

Coordinators/assistant coaches

- Jim Bollman (OL)

Legend

- (C) Team captain
- (S) Suspended
- (I) Ineligible
- Injured
- Redshirt

Roster
