= Rob Holmberg =

American football player (born 1971)

No. 57, 51, 50, 59, 47, 58, 56
- Position: Linebacker

Personal information
- Born: June 5, 1971 (age 55); McKeesport, Pennsylvania, U.S.
- Listed height: 6 ft 3 in (1.91 m)
- Listed weight: 234 lb (106 kg)

Career information
- High school: Mount Pleasant (Mount Pleasant, Pennsylvania)
- College: Navy; Penn State
- NFL draft: 1994: 7th round, 217th overall pick

Career history
- Los Angeles/Oakland Raiders (1994–1997); Indianapolis Colts (1998); New York Jets (1998); Minnesota Vikings (1999); New England Patriots (2000–2001); Carolina Panthers (2001); Green Bay Packers (2001)

Awards and highlights
- Super Bowl champion (XXXVI)

Career NFL statistics
- Tackles: 67
- Sacks: 2
- Fumble recoveries: 2
- Stats at Pro Football Reference

Robert Anthony Holmberg (born June 5, 1971) is an American former professional football player who was a linebacker for eight seasons in the National Football League (NFL). He played high school football for Mt. Pleasant Area School, located in Mount Pleasant, Pennsylvania. He played college football for the Navy Midshipmen and Penn State Nittany Lions before being selected in the seventh round of the 1994 NFL draft.

== College career ==
=== Navy ===
Holmberg Began playing college football at the U.S. Naval Academy (1989–90).

=== Penn State ===
Holmberg transferring to Penn State for final three years.

== Professional career ==
=== Los Angeles/Oakland Raiders ===
Holmberg was selected by Los Angeles Raiders in the seventh round (217th overall) of the 1994 NFL draft. His first Recorded sack on November 12, 1995, against New York Jets. Holmberg was released by the Raiders on August 30, 1998.

=== Indianapolis Colts ===
Holmberg signs with Indianapolis Colts on September 8, 1998. But he released by Colts on September 29.

=== New York Jets ===
Holmberg signs with Jets on October 27. He was released by Jets on September 5.

=== Minnesota Vikings ===
Holmberg signs with Minnesota Vikings on September 7, 1999. He was released on March 31st.

=== New England Patriots ===
Holmberg signs with New England Patriots on July 24. He replaced to the injured of Ted Johnson and Andy Katzenmoyer at middle linebacker, starting five games. He was cut by the Patriots on September 2 unit he resigns with the Patriots on October 5 and he was released by the Patriots on October 16.

=== Carolina Panthers ===
Holmberg signs with Carolina Panthers on October 23, but he played a game with Panthers and he was released by the Panthers on October 31.

=== Green Bay Packers ===
Holmberg signs with Green Bay Packers on December 12. Holmberg re-signs with Packers on April 9 but he was cut by Packers at the end of the 2002 Preseason.

== Personal life ==
Holmberg married with his wife Deidre and he have two Children. He currently owns several Denny's restaurants around the Pittsburgh area. Holmberg is the father in-law of standout Penn State collegiate wrestler and mixed martial arts professional fighter, Bo Nickal.
