= Toddrick McIntosh =

American gridiron football player (1972–2014)

No. 94
- Position: Defensive end

Personal information
- Born: January 22, 1972; Tallahassee, Florida, U.S.
- Died: September 5, 2014 (aged 42); Miami, Florida, U.S.
- Listed height: 6 ft 3 in (1.91 m)
- Listed weight: 250 lb (113 kg)

Career information
- High school: Berkner (Richardson, Texas)
- College: Florida State
- NFL draft: 1994: 7th round, 216th overall pick

Career history
- Dallas Cowboys (1994); Tampa Bay Buccaneers (1994–1995); New Orleans Saints (1995); Green Bay Packers (1996)*; Minnesota Vikings (1997)*; Toronto Argonauts (1998); Tampa Bay Storm (1999)
- * Offseason or practice squad member only

Awards and highlights
- National champion (1993)

Career NFL statistics
- Tackles: 12
- Sacks: 2
- Forced fumbles: 1
- Stats at Pro Football Reference
- Stats at ArenaFan.com

Toddrick Poole McIntosh (January 22, 1972 – September 5, 2014) was a National Football League (NFL) defensive end for the Dallas Cowboys, Tampa Bay Buccaneers and New Orleans Saints. He played college football at Florida State.

== Early life ==
McIntosh attended Lloyd V. Berkner High School, where as a senior he made 77 tackles and 4 sacks, while receiving All-state honors. He accepted a football scholarship from Florida State University.

As a redshirt freshman defensive tackle, he had 33 tackles (3 for loss). In 1991, he was a reserve defensive end that was used in pass rushing situations, registering 6.5 sacks, five tackles for loss, two forced fumbles, and one fumble recovery. He is probably best known for a notable interception he returned 49 yards for a touchdown in the #1–vs.–#3 matchup against the University of Michigan.

As a junior, he became a starter at nose guard, tallying 44 tackles and 2 sacks. In his last year he was the starter at left defensive end, posting 48 tackles (5.5 for loss) and 2 sacks, while helping his team clinch the school's first national championship. He had a season high 9 tackles against the University of Miami.

== Professional career ==
=== Dallas Cowboys ===
McIntosh was selected in the seventh round (216th overall) of the 1994 NFL draft by the Dallas Cowboys. He was waived on November 21.

=== Tampa Bay Buccaneers ===
He was claimed off waivers by the Tampa Bay Buccaneers. He was released on December 19, 1995.

=== New Orleans Saints ===
McIntosh was claimed off waivers by the New Orleans Saints.

=== Green Bay Packers ===
On May 11, 1996, he was traded to the Green Bay Packers in exchange for future considerations. He was cut before the season started.

=== Minnesota Vikings ===
On August 18, 1997, he was released by the Minnesota Vikings.

=== Toronto Argonauts (CFL) ===
On May 21, 1998, he signed with the Toronto Argonauts of the Canadian Football League.

=== Tampa Bay Storm (AFL) ===
McIntosh spent part of 1999 season playing for the Tampa Bay Storm of the Arena Football League.

== Personal life ==
On September 5, 2014, he was declared clinically dead, after being in a coma from a stroke.
