= 1993 San Diego State Aztecs football team =

American college football season

1993 San Diego State Aztecs football
- Conference: Western Athletic Conference
- Record: 6–6 (4–4 WAC)
- Head coach: Al Luginbill (5th season)
- Offensive coordinator: Bret Ingalls (2nd season)
- Offensive scheme: Pro-style
- Defensive coordinator: Barry Lamb (5th season)
- Base defense: 4–3
- Home stadium: Jack Murphy Stadium

1993 Western Athletic Conference football standings
	Conf.					Overall
Team	W		L		T	W		L		T
Fresno State +	6	–	2	–	0	8	–	4	–	0
Wyoming +	6	–	2	–	0	8	–	4	–	0
BYU +	6	–	2	–	0	6	–	6	–	0
Utah	5	–	3	–	0	7	–	6	–	0
Colorado State	5	–	3	–	0	5	–	6	–	0
New Mexico	4	–	4	–	0	6	–	5	–	0
San Diego State	4	–	4	–	0	6	–	6	–	0
Hawaii	3	–	5	–	0	6	–	6	–	0
Air Force	1	–	7	–	0	4	–	8	–	0
UTEP	0	–	8	–	0	1	–	11	–	0
+ – Conference co-champions

The 1993 San Diego State Aztecs football team represented San Diego State University as a member of the Western Athletic Conference (WAC) during the 1993 NCAA Division I-A football season. Led by Al Luginbill in his fifth and final season as head coach, the Aztecs compiled an overall record of 6–6 with a mark of 4–4 conference play, tying for sixth place in the WA. The Aztecs offense scored 413 points while the defense allowed 392 points. The team played home games at Jack Murphy Stadium in San Diego.

== Schedule ==
Date	Time	Opponent	Site	TV	Result	Attendance
September 4	6:05 pm	Cal State Northridge*	Jack Murphy Stadium; San Diego, CA		W 34–17	40,872
September 11	12:30 pm	at California*	California Memorial Stadium; Berkeley, CA	Prime	L 25–45	42,000
September 18	12:30 pm	at Air Force	Falcon Stadium; Colorado Springs, CO	ABC	W 38–31	40,086
September 25	8:00 pm	Minnesota*	Jack Murphy Stadium; San Diego, CA	Prime	W 48–17	41,487
September 30	5:00 pm	UCLA*	Jack Murphy Stadium; San Diego, CA	ESPN	L 13–52	44,669
October 9	9:05 pm	at Hawaii	Aloha Stadium; Halawa, HI	Prime	W 45–14	45,641
October 16	6:05 pm	Colorado State	Jack Murphy Stadium; San Diego, CA		W 30–3	32,335
October 23	6:05 pm	New Mexico^{†}	Jack Murphy Stadium; San Diego		W 20–17	39,260
October 30	11:05 am	at Utah	Robert Rice Stadium; Salt Lake City, UT	Prime	L 41–45	23,025
November 11	5:00 pm	BYU	Jack Murphy Stadium; San Diego, CA	ESPN	L 44–45	40,137
November 20	5:00 pm	at Fresno State	Bulldog Stadium; Fresno, CA (rivalry)		L 37–63	41,031
November 27	6:05 pm	Wyoming	Jack Murphy Stadium; San Diego, CA		L 38–43	30,579
*Non-conference game; ^{†}Homecoming

== Team players in the NFL ==
The following were selected in the 1994 NFL draft.

Player	Position	Round	Overall	NFL team
Marshall Faulk	Running back	1	2	Indianapolis Colts
Darnay Scott	Wide receiver	2	30	Cincinnati Bengals
Ramondo Stallings	Defensive end	7	195	Cincinnati Bengals

The following finished their college career in 1993, were not drafted, but played in the NFL.

Player	Position	First NFL team
Chris Johnson	Defensive back	1996 Minnesota Vikings

== Team awards ==
Award	Player
Most Valuable Player (John Simcox Memorial Trophy)	Marshall Faulk
Outstanding Offensive & Defensive Linemen (Byron H. Chase Memorial Trophy)	Carlson Leomili, Off; La'Roi Glover, Def
Team captains Dr. R. Hardy / C.E. Peterson Memorial Trophy	Carlson Leomili, Off; Darrell Lewis, Def
Most Inspirational Player	Wayne Pittman
