= Freedom Bowl =

Freedom Bowl (defunct)
- Stadium: Anaheim Stadium
- Location: Anaheim, California
- Operated: 1984–1994

The Freedom Bowl was an annual post-season college football bowl game played at Anaheim Stadium in Anaheim, California, from 1984 to 1994.

The bowl frequently invited a team from the Western Athletic Conference to compete against an at-large opponent, provided that the conference had enough bowl-eligible teams.

After the 1994 season, the Freedom Bowl was discontinued as the WAC’s automatic bowl bids were reduced to one with the Holiday Bowl and Cotton Bowl Classic having choice of the conference champion.

== Game results ==
Date	Winner		Loser		Notes
December 26, 1984	Iowa	55	#19 Texas	17	
December 30, 1985	Washington	20	Colorado	17	
December 30, 1986	#15 UCLA	31	BYU	10	
December 30, 1987	Arizona State	33	Air Force	28	
December 29, 1988	BYU	20	#20 Colorado	17	
December 30, 1989	Washington	34	Florida	7	
December 29, 1990	Colorado State	32	Oregon	31	
December 30, 1991	#22 Tulsa	28	San Diego State	17	
December 29, 1992	Fresno State	24	#23 USC	7	
December 30, 1993	USC	28	Utah	21	
December 27, 1994	#12 Utah	16	#15 Arizona	13	

== Appearances by team ==
Rank	Team	Appearances	Record	Win %
T1	[[Washington Huskies football|Washington]]	2	2–0	1.000
T1	[[BYU Cougars football|BYU]]	2	1–1	.500
T1	[[USC Trojans football|USC]]	2	1–1	.500
T1	[[Utah Utes football|Utah]]	2	1–1	.500
T1	[[Colorado Buffaloes football|Colorado]]	2	0–2	.000
T6	[[Arizona State Sun Devils football|Arizona State]]	1	1–0	1.000
T6	[[Colorado State Rams football|Colorado State]]	1	1–0	1.000
T6	[[Fresno State Bulldogs football|Fresno State]]	1	1–0	1.000
T6	[[Iowa Hawkeyes football|Iowa]]	1	1–0	1.000
T6	[[Tulsa Golden Hurricane football|Tulsa]]	1	1–0	1.000
T6	[[UCLA Bruins football|UCLA]]	1	1–0	1.000
T6	[[Air Force Falcons football|Air Force]]	1	0–1	.000
T6	[[Arizona Wildcats football|Arizona]]	1	0–1	.000
T6	[[Florida Gators football|Florida]]	1	0–1	.000
T6	[[Oregon Ducks football|Oregon]]	1	0–1	.000
T6	[[San Diego State Aztecs football|San Diego State]]	1	0–1	.000
T6	[[Texas Longhorns football|Texas]]	1	0–1	.000

== Appearances by conference ==
Rank	Conference	Appearances	Record	Win %	# of Teams	Teams
T1	Pac-10	8	5–3	.625	6	Washington (2–0) USC (1–1); Arizona State (1–0); UCLA (1–0); Arizona (0–1); Oregon (0–1)
T1	WAC	8	4–4	.500	6	BYU (1–1) Utah (1–1); Colorado State (1–0); Fresno State (1–0); Air Force (0–1); San Diego State (0–1)
3	Big Eight	2	0–2	.000	1	Colorado (0–2)
T4	Big Ten	1	1–0	1.000	1	Iowa (1–0)
T4	Independent	1	1–0	1.000	1	Tulsa (1–0)
T4	SEC	1	0–1	.000	1	Florida (0–1)
T4	SWC	1	0–1	.000	1	Texas (0–1)

== See also ==
- List of college bowl games
