= 1993 BYU Cougars football team =

American college football season

1993 BYU Cougars football

WAC co-champion

Holiday Bowl, L 21–28 vs. Ohio State
- Conference: Western Athletic Conference
- Record: 6–6 (6–2 WAC)
- Head coach: LaVell Edwards (22nd season)
- Offensive coordinator: Roger French (13th season)
- Offensive scheme: West Coast
- Defensive coordinator: Ken Schmidt (3rd season)
- Base defense: 4–3
- Home stadium: Cougar Stadium

1993 Western Athletic Conference football standings
	Conf.					Overall
Team	W		L		T	W		L		T
Fresno State +	6	–	2	–	0	8	–	4	–	0
Wyoming +	6	–	2	–	0	8	–	4	–	0
BYU +	6	–	2	–	0	6	–	6	–	0
Utah	5	–	3	–	0	7	–	6	–	0
Colorado State	5	–	3	–	0	5	–	6	–	0
New Mexico	4	–	4	–	0	6	–	5	–	0
San Diego State	4	–	4	–	0	6	–	6	–	0
Hawaii	3	–	5	–	0	6	–	6	–	0
Air Force	1	–	7	–	0	4	–	8	–	0
UTEP	0	–	8	–	0	1	–	11	–	0
+ – Conference co-champions

The 1993 BYU Cougars football team represented Brigham Young University (BYU) in the 1993 NCAA Division I-A football season.

== Schedule ==
Date	Opponent	Rank	Site	TV	Result	Attendance
September 4	at New Mexico	No. 19	University Stadium; Albuquerque, NM		W 34–31	
September 11	Hawaii	No. 20	Cougar Stadium; Provo, UT		W 41–38	65,771
September 18	at Colorado State	No. 19	Hughes Stadium; Fort Collins, CO		W 27–22	23,104
September 25	Air Force	No. 21	Cougar Stadium; Provo, UT		W 30–3	
October 9	at No. 25 UCLA*	No. 19	Rose Bowl; Pasadena, CA	CBS	L 14–68	50,713
October 16	No. 3 Notre Dame*		Cougar Stadium; Provo, UT	ESPN	L 20–45	66,247
October 23	Fresno State		Cougar Stadium; Provo, UT		L 45–48	65,816
October 30	at Utah State*		Romney Stadium; Logan, UT (rivalry)		L 56–58	26,328
November 11	at San Diego State		Jack Murphy Stadium; San Diego, CA	ESPN	W 45–44	40,137
November 20	Utah		Cougar Stadium; Provo, UT (Holy War)	KSL	L 31–34	65,894
November 27	UTEP		Cougar Stadium; Provo, UT		W 47–16	63,649
December 30	vs. No. 11 Ohio State*		Jack Murphy Stadium; San Diego, CA (Holiday Bowl)	ESPN	L 21–28	52,108
*Non-conference game; Rankings from AP Poll released prior to the game

== Game summaries ==
=== Utah ===
Utah Utes (6–5) at BYU Cougars (5–4)

Quarter	1	2	3	4	Total
Utah	14	3	0	17	34
BYU	3	7	7	14	31

at Cougar Stadium, Provo, Utah

- Date: November 20, 1993
- Game time: 12:00 p.m.
- Game weather: 44 °F (7 °C)
- Game attendance: 65,894
- TV: KSL
- Box Score

Team	Category	Player	Statistics
Utah	Passing	Mike McCoy	29/47, 434 yards, 3 TD, 2 INT
Utah	Rushing	Jamal Anderson	32 rushes, 146 yards, TD
Utah	Receiving	Greg Hooks	7 receptions, 134 yards
BYU	Passing	John Walsh	35/57, 423 yards, TD, 5 INT
BYU	Rushing	Kalin Hall	14 rushes, 80 yards
BYU	Receiving	Tim Nowatzke	6 receptions, 82 yards

External videos
- Game highlights

Scoring summary

Quarter	Time	Drive			Team	Scoring information	Score	
Quarter	Time	Plays	Yards	TOP	Team	Scoring information	UTAH	BYU
1					Utah	Bryan Rowley 4-yard touchdown reception from Mike McCoy, Chris Yergensen kick good	7	0
1					BYU	36-yard field goal by Joe Herrick	7	3
1			80		Utah	Jamal Anderson 9-yard touchdown reception from Mike McCoy, Chris Yergensen kick good	14	3
2					BYU	Bryce Doman 3-yard touchdown reception from John Walsh, Joe Herrick kick good	14	10
2					Utah	41-yard field goal by Chris Yergensen	17	10
3					BYU	John Walsh 1-yard touchdown run, Joe Herrick kick good	17	17
4					Utah	Curtis Marsh 84-yard touchdown reception from Mike McCoy, Chris Yergensen kick no good	23	17
4					BYU	Kalin Hall 4-yard touchdown run, Joe Herrick kick good	23	24
4	4:39				Utah	Jamal Anderson 4-yard touchdown run, 2-point pass good	31	24
4	3:16				BYU	John Walsh 1-yard touchdown run, Joe Herrick kick good	31	31
4	0:25				Utah	55-yard field goal by Chris Yergensen	34	31
"TOP" = time of possession. For other American football terms, see Glossary of American football.							34	31

== Roster ==
1993 BYU Cougars football team roster
Players
Coaches
Offense

Pos.	#	Name	Class
OT	76	Eli Herring	Jr
TE	96	Chad Lewis	Fr
WR	80	Kaipo McGuire	Fr
TE	88	Itula Mili	Fr
WR	42	Tim Nowatzke	Jr
G	70	Evan Pilgrim	Jr
QB	7	John Walsh	Jr

Defense

Pos.	#	Name	Class
DE	56	Travis Hall	Jr
LB	46	Shay Muirbrook	Fr

Special teams

Pos.	#	Name	Class
K		Joe Herrick

Head coach

- LaVell Edwards

Coordinators/assistant coaches

Legend

- (C) Team captain
- (S) Suspended
- (I) Ineligible
- Injured
- Redshirt

Roster
