= 1993 Indiana State Sycamores football team =

American college football season

1993 Indiana State Sycamores football
- Conference: Gateway Football Conference
- Record: 4–7 (2–4 GFC)
- Head coach: Dennis Raetz (14th season)
- Home stadium: Memorial Stadium

1993 Gateway Football Conference standings
	Conf.					Overall
Team	W		L		T	W		L		T
No. 13 Northern Iowa $^	5	–	1	–	0	8	–	4	–	0
Southwest Missouri State	4	–	2	–	0	7	–	4	–	0
Western Illinois	4	–	2	–	0	4	–	7	–	0
Illinois State	2	–	3	–	1	6	–	4	–	1
Eastern Illinois	2	–	3	–	1	3	–	7	–	1
Indiana State	2	–	4	–	0	4	–	7	–	0
Southern Illinois	1	–	5	–	0	2	–	9	–	0
$ – Conference champion; ^ – NCAA Division I-AA playoff participant; Rankings from The Sports Network poll

The 1993 Indiana State Sycamores football team represented Indiana State University as a member of the Gateway Football Conference (GFC) during the 1993 NCAA Division I-AA football season. The team was led by 14th-year head coach Dennis Raetz and played their home games at Memorial Stadium in Terre Haute, Indiana. The Sycamores finished the season with a 4–7 record overall and a 2–4 record in conference play; they upset #18 Western Kentucky to secure Raeztz's 10th Homecoming win - a program record.

== Schedule ==
Date	Opponent	Site	Result	Attendance	Source
September 4	at Air Force*	Falcon Stadium; Colorado Springs, CO	L 21–63		
September 11	at Minnesota*	Hubert H. Humphrey Metrodome; Minneapolis, MN	L 10–27	30,719	
September 25	at Southwest Missouri State	Plaster Sports Complex; Springfield, MO	L 21–31		
October 2	Eastern Illinois	Memorial Stadium; Terre Haute, IN	W 27–24	6,838	
October 9	at No. 11 Northern Iowa	UNI-Dome; Cedar Falls, IA	L 10–17	14,431	
October 16	at Illinois State	Hancock Stadium; Normal, IL	L 3–27		
October 23	No. 18 Western Kentucky*^{†}	Memorial Stadium; Terre Haute, IN	W 41–14	10,191	
October 30	Southern Illinois	Memorial Stadium; Terre Haute, IN	L 26–35	3,140	
November 6	at Youngstown State*	Stambaugh Stadium; Youngstown, OH	L 10–17		
November 13	West Virginia Tech*	Memorial Stadium; Terre Haute, IN	W 49–6		
November 20	Western Illinois	Memorial Stadium; Terre Haute, IN	W 16–6		
*Non-conference game; ^{†}Homecoming; Rankings from The Sports Network Poll released prior to the game
