= 1993 Wyoming Cowboys football team =

American college football season

1993 Wyoming Cowboys football

WAC co-champion

Copper Bowl, L 17–52 vs. Kansas State
- Conference: Western Athletic Conference
- Record: 8–4 (6–2 WAC)
- Head coach: Joe Tiller (3rd season)
- Offensive coordinator: Larry Korpitz (3rd season)
- Defensive coordinator: Scott Downing (3rd season)
- Home stadium: War Memorial Stadium

1993 Western Athletic Conference football standings
	Conf.					Overall
Team	W		L		T	W		L		T
Fresno State +	6	–	2	–	0	8	–	4	–	0
Wyoming +	6	–	2	–	0	8	–	4	–	0
BYU +	6	–	2	–	0	6	–	6	–	0
Utah	5	–	3	–	0	7	–	6	–	0
Colorado State	5	–	3	–	0	5	–	6	–	0
New Mexico	4	–	4	–	0	6	–	5	–	0
San Diego State	4	–	4	–	0	6	–	6	–	0
Hawaii	3	–	5	–	0	6	–	6	–	0
Air Force	1	–	7	–	0	4	–	8	–	0
UTEP	0	–	8	–	0	1	–	11	–	0
+ – Conference co-champions

The 1993 Wyoming Cowboys football team represented the University of Wyoming in the 1993 NCAA Division I-A football season. It was the Cowboys' 97th season and they competed as a member of the Western Athletic Conference (WAC). The team was led by head coach Joe Tiller, in his third year, and played their home games at War Memorial Stadium in Laramie, Wyoming. They finished with a record of eight wins and four losses (8–4, 6–2 WAC), as WAC co-champions with BYU and Fresno State and with a loss in the Copper Bowl. The Cowboys offense scored 357 points, while the defense allowed 329 points.

== Schedule ==
Date	Time	Opponent	Rank	Site	TV	Result	Attendance
September 4	1:00 pm	Oregon State*		War Memorial Stadium; Laramie, WY		L 16–27	22,923
September 11	1:00 pm	No. 10 (I-AA) Northern Iowa*		War Memorial Stadium; Laramie, WY		W 45–42	17,827
September 18	4:00 pm	at San Jose State*		Spartan Stadium; San Jose, CA		W 36–25	14,265
September 25	12:00 pm	Utah		War Memorial Stadium; Laramie, WY		W 28–12	17,307
October 2	1:00 pm	at Air Force		Falcon Stadium; Colorado Springs, CO		W 31–18	38,099
October 9	7:00 pm	at UTEP		Sun Bowl; El Paso, TX		W 33–26	34,263
October 23	1:00 pm	Hawaii^{†}		War Memorial Stadium; Laramie, WY		W 48–10	25,208
October 30	1:00 pm	Fresno State		War Memorial Stadium; Laramie, WY		W 32–28	16,895
November 13	1:00 pm	at New Mexico	No. 23	University Stadium; Albuquerque, NM		L 7–10	18,219
November 20	1:30 pm	Colorado State		War Memorial Stadium; Laramie, WY (Border War)	ABC	L 21–41	17,000
November 27	8:00 pm	at San Diego State		Jack Murphy Stadium; San Diego, CA		W 43–38	30,579
December 29	6:00 pm	vs. No. 20 Kansas State*		Arizona Stadium; Tucson, AZ (Copper Bowl)	ESPN	L 17–52	49,075
*Non-conference game; ^{†}Homecoming; Rankings from AP Poll released prior to the game; All times are in Mountain time

== Roster ==
1993 Wyoming Cowboys football team roster
Players
Coaches
Offense

Pos.	#	Name	Class
RB	34	Ryan Christopherson	Jr
WR	23	Marcus Harris	Fr
WR	16	Ryan Yarborough	Sr

Defense

Pos.	#	Name	Class
DE	50	John Burrough	Jr
LB	47	Joe Cummings	So

Special teams

Pos.	#	Name	Class

Head coach

- Joe Tiller

Coordinators/assistant coaches

Legend

- (C) Team captain
- (S) Suspended
- (I) Ineligible
- Injured
- Redshirt

== Team players in the NFL ==
The following were selected in the 1994 NFL draft.

Player	Position	Round	Overall	NFL team
Ryan Yarborough	Wide receiver	2	41	New York Jets
