= 1993 Central Michigan Chippewas football team =

American college football season

1993 Central Michigan Chippewas football
- Conference: Mid-American Conference
- Record: 5–6 (4–3 MAC)
- Head coach: Herb Deromedi (16th season)
- Offensive coordinator: Tom Kearly (3rd season)
- MVP: Joe Youngblood
- Home stadium: Kelly/Shorts Stadium

1993 Mid-American Conference football standings
	Conf.					Overall
Team	W		L		T	W		L		T
Ball State $	7	–	0	–	1	8	–	3	–	1
Western Michigan	6	–	1	–	1	7	–	3	–	1
Bowling Green	5	–	1	–	2	6	–	3	–	2
Central Michigan	5	–	4	–	0	5	–	6	–	0
Akron	4	–	4	–	0	5	–	6	–	0
Ohio	4	–	5	–	0	4	–	7	–	0
Eastern Michigan	3	–	5	–	0	4	–	7	–	0
Toledo	3	–	5	–	0	4	–	7	–	0
Miami (OH)	3	–	6	–	0	4	–	7	–	0
Kent State	0	–	9	–	0	0	–	11	–	0
$ – Conference champion

The 1993 Central Michigan Chippewas football team represented Central Michigan University in the Mid-American Conference (MAC) during the 1993 NCAA Division I-A football season. In their 16th season under head coach Herb Deromedi, the Chippewas compiled a 5–6 record (4–3 against MAC opponents), finished in fourth place in the MAC, and outscored their opponents, 275 to 244. The team played its home games in Kelly/Shorts Stadium in Mount Pleasant, Michigan, with attendance of 93,295 in five home games.

The team's statistical leaders included quarterback Joe Youngblood with 2,466 passing yards, tailback Brian Pruitt with 944 rushing yards, and flanker D. J. Reid with 693 receiving yards. Youngblood was named as Central Michigan's most valuable player for the second consecutive year. Offensive lineman Darrell McCaul, placekicker Chuck Selinger, and linebacker Mike Kyler were selected as first-team All-MAC players.

In March 1994, Herb Deromedi quit his position as Central Michigan's head football coach to become the school's athletic director. Deromedi had hoped to continue coaching the football team, but the university administration required him to choose between coaching or taking on the duties of athletic director. He said at the time, "To be honest, I was disappointed I wasn't given the opportunity to coach the 1994 season." In 16 years as head coach, Deromedi compiled a 110–55–10 record. An alumnus of the University of Michigan, he was inducted into the College Football Hall of Fame in 2007.

== Schedule ==
Date	Time	Opponent	Site	Result	Attendance	Source
September 2		Akron	Kelly/Shorts Stadium; Mount Pleasant, MI	L 13–23		
September 11		Ohio	Kelly/Shorts Stadium; Mount Pleasant, MI	W 38–0		
September 18		at UNLV*	Sam Boyd Stadium; Whitney, NV	L 20–33	14,056	
September 25	1:00 p.m.	at Michigan State*	Spartan Stadium; East Lansing, MI	L 34–48	66,533	
October 2		Ball State	Kelly/Shorts Stadium; Mount Pleasant, MI	L 17–20		
October 9		at Western Michigan	Waldo Stadium; Kalamazoo, MI (rivalry)	W 23–18		
October 16		Eastern Michigan	Kelly/Shorts Stadium; Mount Pleasant, MI (rivalry)	L 21–28		
October 23		at Kent State	Dix Stadium; Kent, OH	W 33–28		
November 6		at Toledo	Glass Bowl; Toledo, OH	W 38–7		
November 13		Bowling Green	Kelly/Shorts Stadium; Mount Pleasant, MI	W 17–15		
November 20		at Miami (OH)	Yager Stadium; Oxford, OH	L 21–24		
*Non-conference game; All times are in Eastern time
