= 1993 Eastern Michigan Eagles football team =

American college football season

1993 Eastern Michigan Eagles football
- Conference: Mid-American Conference
- Record: 4–7 (3–5 MAC)
- Head coach: Ron Cooper (1st season)
- Offensive coordinator: Richard Wilson (1st season)
- Defensive coordinator: Thomas Roggeman (1st season)
- Captain: Game captains
- Home stadium: Rynearson Stadium

1993 Mid-American Conference football standings
	Conf.					Overall
Team	W		L		T	W		L		T
Ball State $	7	–	0	–	1	8	–	3	–	1
Western Michigan	6	–	1	–	1	7	–	3	–	1
Bowling Green	5	–	1	–	2	6	–	3	–	2
Central Michigan	5	–	4	–	0	5	–	6	–	0
Akron	4	–	4	–	0	5	–	6	–	0
Ohio	4	–	5	–	0	4	–	7	–	0
Eastern Michigan	3	–	5	–	0	4	–	7	–	0
Toledo	3	–	5	–	0	4	–	7	–	0
Miami (OH)	3	–	6	–	0	4	–	7	–	0
Kent State	0	–	9	–	0	0	–	11	–	0
$ – Conference champion

The 1993 Eastern Michigan Eagles football team represented Eastern Michigan University in the 1993 NCAA Division I-A football season. In their first season under head coach Ron Cooper, the Eagles compiled a 4–7 record (3–5 against conference opponents), finished in a tie for seventh place in the Mid-American Conference, and were outscored by their opponents, 220 to 163. The team's statistical leaders included Michael Armour with 1,208 passing yards, Melvin Green with 488 rushing yards, and Anthony Cicchelli with 616 receiving yards.

== Schedule ==
Date	Opponent	Site	Result	Attendance	Source
September 4	at West Virginia*	Mountaineer Field; Morgantown, WV	L 6–48	50,483	
September 9	Temple*	Rynearson Stadium; Ypsilanti, MI	L 28–31		
September 18	Western Illinois*	Rynearson Stadium; Ypsilanti, MI	W 16–14	14,247	
October 2	at Miami (OH)	Yager Stadium; Oxford, OH	W 15–7		
October 9	Kent State^{†}	Rynearson Stadium; Ypsilanti, MI	W 20–15		
October 16	at Central Michigan	Kelly/Shorts Stadium; Mount Pleasant, MI (rivalry)	W 28–21		
October 23	Western Michigan	Rynearson Stadium; Ypsilanti, MI	L 20–21		
October 30	Ball State	Rynearson Stadium; Ypsilanti, MI	L 13–18		
November 6	at Akron	Rubber Bowl; Akron, OH	L 7–19		
November 13	Ohio	Rynearson Stadium; Ypsilanti, MI	L 10–12		
November 19	at Toledo	Glass Bowl; Toledo, OH	L 0–14		
*Non-conference game; ^{†}Homecoming

1993 Eastern Michigan Eagles football team roster
Players
Coaches
Offense

Pos.	#	Name	Class
QB		Michael Armour	So
WR		Anthony Cicchelli	Sr
WR		Steve Clay	So
RB		Melvin Green	Jr
QB		Dayna Hall

Defense

Pos.	#	Name	Class
DB		Vashone Adam	Jr

Special teams

Pos.	#	Name	Class
K		Carson Green	Fr

Head coach

- Ron Cooper

Coordinators/assistant coaches

- Thomas Roggeman (Defensive coordinator)
- Richard Wilson (Offensive coordinator)
- John Bowers
- Lawrence Cole
- Russ Ehrenfeld
- Todd Monken (Defensive backs)

Legend

- (C) Team captain
- (S) Suspended
- (I) Ineligible
- Injured
- Redshirt
