= 1993 Illinois State Redbirds football team =

American college football season

1993 Illinois State Redbirds football
- Conference: Gateway Football Conference
- Record: 6–4–1 (2–3–1 GFC)
- Head coach: Jim Heacock (6th season)
- Home stadium: Hancock Stadium

1993 Gateway Football Conference standings
	Conf.					Overall
Team	W		L		T	W		L		T
No. 13 Northern Iowa $^	5	–	1	–	0	8	–	4	–	0
Southwest Missouri State	4	–	2	–	0	7	–	4	–	0
Western Illinois	4	–	2	–	0	4	–	7	–	0
Illinois State	2	–	3	–	1	6	–	4	–	1
Eastern Illinois	2	–	3	–	1	3	–	7	–	1
Indiana State	2	–	4	–	0	4	–	7	–	0
Southern Illinois	1	–	5	–	0	2	–	9	–	0
$ – Conference champion; ^ – NCAA Division I-AA playoff participant; Rankings from The Sports Network poll

The 1993 Illinois State Redbirds football team represented Illinois State University as a member of the Gateway Football Conference (GFC) during the 1993 NCAA Division I-AA football season. In their sixth year under head coach Jim Heacock, the Redbirds compiled an overall record of 6–4–1, with a mark of 2–3–1 in conference play, and finished tied for fourth in the GFC. Illinois State played home games at Hancock Stadium in Normal, Illinois.

== Schedule ==
Date	Opponent	Rank	Site	Result	Attendance	Source
September 4	at Tennessee Tech*		Tucker Stadium; Cookeville, TN	W 23–18		
September 11	at Ball State*		Ball State Stadium; Muncie, IN	L 30–45		
September 18	No. 2 McNeese State*		Hancock Stadium; Normal, IL	W 37–27	9,819	
September 25	at Hofstra*	No. 24	Hofstra Stadium; Hempstead, NY	W 16–6	1,837	
October 2	Western Illinois	No. 20	Hancock Stadium; Normal, IL	L 12–17		
October 9	at Southwest Missouri State		Plaster Sports Complex; Springfield, MO	L 28–40	8,955	
October 16	Indiana State		Hancock Stadium; Normal, IL	W 27–3		
October 23	at Eastern Illinois		O'Brien Stadium; Charleston, IL (rivalry)	T 17–17	8,215	
October 30	No. 17 Northern Iowa		Hancock Stadium; Normal, IL	L 19–20	5,841	
November 6	at Southern Illinois		McAndrew Stadium; Carbondale, IL	W 34–16	2,500	
November 13	No. 1 Youngstown State*		Hancock Stadium; Normal, IL	W 13–10	5,195	
*Non-conference game; Rankings from The Sports Network Poll released prior to the game
