= 1993 Colorado State Rams football team =

American college football season

1993 Colorado State Rams football
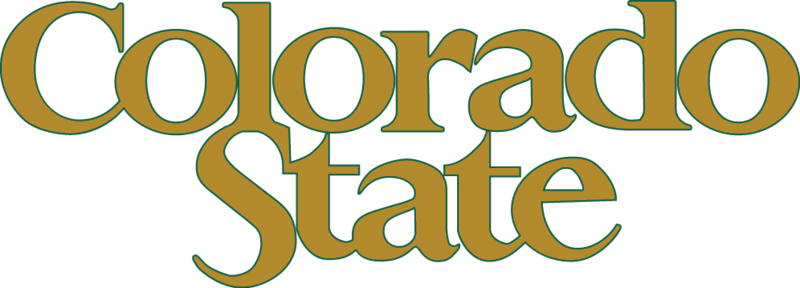
- Conference: Western Athletic Conference
- Record: 5–6 (5–3 WAC)
- Head coach: Sonny Lubick (1st season)
- Offensive coordinator: Dave Lay (3rd season)
- Defensive coordinator: Larry Kerr (1st season)
- Home stadium: Hughes Stadium

1993 Western Athletic Conference football standings
	Conf.					Overall
Team	W		L		T	W		L		T
Fresno State +	6	–	2	–	0	8	–	4	–	0
Wyoming +	6	–	2	–	0	8	–	4	–	0
BYU +	6	–	2	–	0	6	–	6	–	0
Utah	5	–	3	–	0	7	–	6	–	0
Colorado State	5	–	3	–	0	5	–	6	–	0
New Mexico	4	–	4	–	0	6	–	5	–	0
San Diego State	4	–	4	–	0	6	–	6	–	0
Hawaii	3	–	5	–	0	6	–	6	–	0
Air Force	1	–	7	–	0	4	–	8	–	0
UTEP	0	–	8	–	0	1	–	11	–	0
+ – Conference co-champions

The 1993 Colorado State Rams football team represented Colorado State University in the Western Athletic Conference during the 1993 NCAA Division I-A football season. In their first season under head coach Sonny Lubick, the Rams compiled a 5–6 record.

== Schedule ==
Date	Opponent	Site	Result	Attendance
September 4	Oregon*	Hughes Stadium; Fort Collins, CO	L 9–23	21,721
September 11	Air Force	Hughes Stadium; Fort Collins, CO (rivalry)	W 8–5	24,093
September 18	No. 19 BYU	Hughes Stadium; Fort Collins, CO	L 22–27	23,104
September 25	at No. 6 Nebraska*	Memorial Stadium; Lincoln, NE	L 13–48	75,625
October 2	at Kansas*	Memorial Stadium; Lawrence, KS	L 6–24	37,500
October 9	Fresno State	Hughes Stadium; Fort Collins, CO	W 34–32	23,812
October 16	at San Diego State	Jack Murphy Stadium; San Diego, CA	L 3–30	32,355
October 23	at Utah	Robert Rice Stadium; Salt Lake City, UT	L 21–38	21,097
October 30	New Mexico	Hughes Stadium; Fort Collins, CO	W 21–20	17,270
November 13	at UTEP	Sun Bowl; El Paso, TX	W 52–0	11,225
November 20	at Wyoming	War Memorial Stadium; Laramie, WY (rivalry)	W 41–21	20,692
*Non-conference game; Rankings from AP Poll released prior to the game

== Roster ==
1993 Colorado State Rams football team roster
Players
Coaches
Offense

Pos.	#	Name	Class
G	65	Pat Meyer	Jr

Defense

Pos.	#	Name	Class
S	3	Greg Myers	So
DT	44	Sean Moran	So
DE	57	Mitch Palmer	So
DE	91	Brady Smith	So

Special teams

Pos.	#	Name	Class

Head coach

- Sonny Lubick

Coordinators/assistant coaches

Legend

- (C) Team captain
- (S) Suspended
- (I) Ineligible
- Injured
- Redshirt
