= 1993 Copper Bowl =

- 5th Copper Bowl
Wyoming Cowboys	Kansas State Wildcats
(8–3)	(8–2–1)
WAC	Big Eight
17	52
Head coach: Joe Tiller	Head coach: Bill Snyder
	AP / Coaches / BC; 20 / 19 / 20
	1	2	3	4	Total
Wyoming	3	7	0	7	17
Kansas State	10	14	14	14	52
- Date: December 29, 1993
- Season: 1993
- Stadium: Arizona Stadium
- Location: Tucson, Arizona
- MVP: Andre Coleman
- Referee: James Sprenger (Pac-10)
- Attendance: 49,075

United States TV coverage
- Network: ESPN
- Announcers: Kevin Harlan and Craig James

The 1993 Copper Bowl was an American college football bowl game played on December 29, 1993 at Arizona Stadium in Tucson, Arizona. The fifth edition of the Copper Bowl featured the Wyoming Cowboys and the Kansas State Wildcats. Kansas State capped off its most successful season in 83 years with its first-ever bowl game victory. The 20th ranked Kansas State Wildcats, making only their second bowl appearance in school history, defeated the Wyoming Cowboys, 52–17.

== Game summary ==
Wyoming took a quick 3–0 lead on a 35-yard field goal, but K-State put its high-powered offense into overdrive and scored on its first three possessions. J.J. Smith put K-State on the board with a two-yard TD run and Tate Wright added a 22-yard field goal before K-State drove 76 yards on its third possession to take a 16–3 edge on a Chad May touchdown plunge. All-American Andre Coleman closed out the first half with a 68-yard punt return to put K-State ahead 24–10 at the break, then blew things open with a 61-yard touchdown catch just 54 seconds into the third quarter.

Freshman All-American Kevin Lockett put K-State ahead 38–10 midway through the third quarter with a 30-yard touchdown reception before reserve running back Leon Edwards added a 13-yard touchdown run and cornerback Kenny McEntyre provided the game's crowning moment with a 37-yard interception return for a score.

Coleman racked up a career-high 283 yards of total offense, tying or breaking three Copper Bowl records along the way. May threw for 275 yards and two touchdowns.
