= 1986 Freedom Bowl =

- Freedom Bowl III
BYU Cougars	UCLA Bruins
(8–4)	(7–3–1)
10	31
Head coach: Lavell Edwards	Head coach: Terry Donahue
	AP / Coaches; 15 / 15
	1	2	3	4	Total
BYU	3	0	0	7	10
UCLA	7	0	17	7	31
- Date: December 30, 1986
- Season: 1986
- Stadium: Anaheim Stadium
- Location: Anaheim, California
- MVP: Gaston Green (UCLA RB)
- National anthem: BYU Cougar Marching Band
- Referee: J.C. Louderback (Big Eight)
- Halftime show: BYU Cougar Marching Band
- Attendance: 55,422

United States TV coverage
- Network: Mizlou Television Network
- Announcers: Howard David and Jack Snow

The 1986 Freedom Bowl was a college football bowl game played on December 30, 1986. It was the third Freedom Bowl Game. The UCLA Bruins defeated the BYU Cougars 31–10. UCLA tailback Gaston Green was named the Player Of The Game. He ran for a record 266 yards, second only at the time to Curtis Dickey who ran for 276 in the 1978 Hall of Fame Classic. This is still the Pac-10 record for most rushing yards in a bowl game, and fourth highest in NCAA bowl history.

== Teams ==
See also 1986 NCAA Division I-A football season

The BYU Cougars were voted national champions in 1984. In their opening game in 1985, they faced UCLA. The Bruins won 27–24. It was the first win for the Bruins as the headed towards the Pac-10 conference championship and appearance in the 1986 Rose Bowl.

=== BYU Cougars ===
The BYU Cougars were the second place team in the Western Athletic Conference (WAC). They had lost to Colorado State in October. They were still in the hunt, but a 10–3 loss to San Diego State on November 29, 1986, gave SDSU the WAC conference championship lead.

=== UCLA Bruins ===
The UCLA Bruins were tied for second in the Pacific-10 Conference. The ASU Sun Devils had beaten UCLA in Los Angeles. This gave them the tiebreaker for the Pac-10 championship. UCLA was still in the race, and could have been the Pac-10 champion, but a tie with Washington and a loss to Stanford put them behind the Sun Devils.

With Arizona State clinching the Pac-10 championship and berth in the 1987 Rose Bowl early, there began a scramble by the bowls to make deals with schools before the official date. The Fiesta Bowl and Citrus Bowl scrambling to host a #1 versus #2 showdown between Miami and Penn State, the Cotton Bowl struck an agreement to take the loser of the Michigan–Ohio State game.

== Game summary ==
The weather was overcast and 68 degrees. The first two Freedom Bowls had only sold 31,000 tickets, but this one had an advance sale of 42,000. The attendance of 55,422 was the Freedom Bowl record. The 1992 Freedom bowl featuring USC and Fresno State was expected to surpass it, but had an attendance of 50,745.

== Scoring ==
=== First quarter ===
- BYU — Leonard Chitty, 32-yard field goal.
- UCLA — Gaston Green three-yard run. Dave Franey converts.

=== Second quarter ===
No score

=== Third quarter ===
- UCLA — Green, one-yard run. Franey converts.
- UCLA — Franey, 49-yard field goal.
- UCLA — Green, 79-yard run. Franey converts.

=== Fourth quarter ===
- UCLA — Karl Dorrell, 13-yard pass from Green. Franey converts.
- BYU — Bruce Hansen three-yard run. Chitty converts.

== Bibliography ==
- UCLA Football Media Guide (PDF Copy available at www.uclabruins.com)
- BYU Bowl Games - 1986 Freedom Bowl Archived 2014-01-12 at the Wayback Machine
- Robinson, Doug – 1986 Freedom Bowl: UCLA 31, BYU 10 Turbulent BYU year ends with rout to UCLA Deseret News, December 31, 1986
- Penner, Mike – THE FREEDOM BOWL : UCLA'S CRAIG RUTLEDGE : You Can Go Home to Orange County. Los Angeles Times, December 25, 1986
