= 1993 Las Vegas Bowl =

- 2nd Las Vegas Bowl
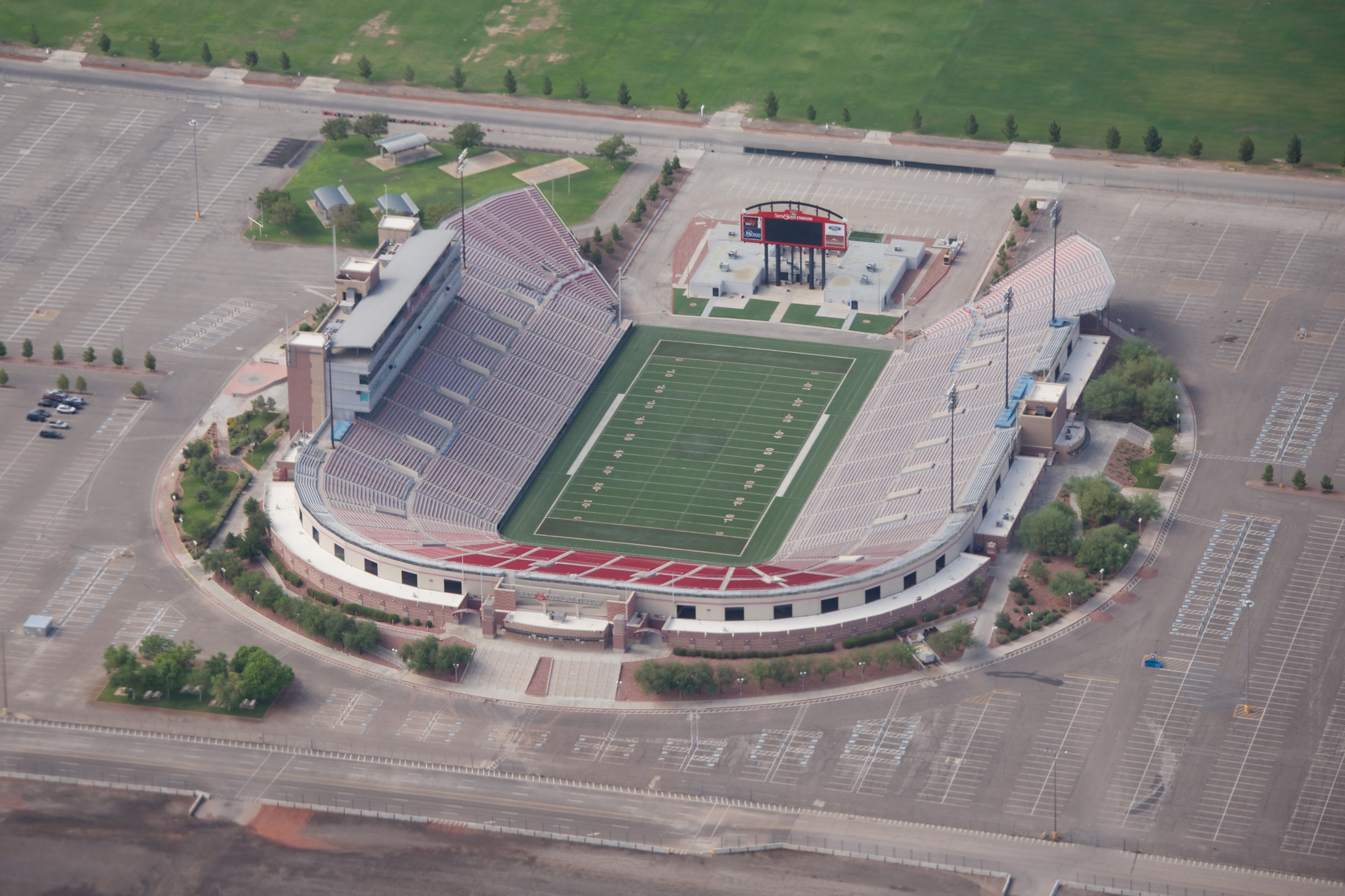
- The Sam Boyd Silver Bowl in Whitney, Nevada, hosted the Las Vegas Bowl.
Ball State Cardinals	Utah State Aggies
(8–3)	(6–5)
MAC	Big West
33	42
Head coach: Paul Schudel	Head coach: Charlie Weatherbie
	1	2	3	4	Total
Ball State	0	0	17	16	33
Utah State	14	7	14	7	42
- Date: December 17, 1993
- Season: 1993
- Stadium: Sam Boyd Silver Bowl
- Location: Whitney, Nevada, U.S.
- MVP: Anthony Calvillo
- Referee: Bill Leavy (Big West); (split crew: Big West and MAC)
- Attendance: 15,508

The 1993 Las Vegas Bowl was played December 17, 1993, at the Sam Boyd Silver Bowl in Whitney, Nevada.

== Background ==
Ball State, of the Mid-American Conference ran the table and won their second conference title in four years, while riding into this bowl game with a four game winning streak. The Aggies of the Big West Conference had won five straight games after starting the season 1–5 to win a share of the conference title with Southwestern Louisiana. This was their first bowl appearance since 1961.

== Game summary ==
- Utah State – McMahon 22 yard pass from Calvillo (Morreale kick, 10:27 1st)
- Utah State – Grier 3 yard run (Morreale kick, 2:34 1st)
- Utah State – Thompson 3 yard pass from Calvillo (Morreale kick, 0:24 2nd)
- Ball State – McCray 7 yard pass from Neu (Swart kick, 13:11 3rd)
- Ball State – Swart 31 yard field goal (12:05 3rd)
- Utah State – Grier 15 yard run (Morreale kick, 6:41 3rd)
- Utah State – Lee 16 yard pass from Calvillo (Morreale kick, 3:32 3rd)
- Ball State – Neu 2 yard pass from Blair (Swart kick, 0:07 3rd)
- Ball State – Safety, Calvillo forced out of end zone (12:56 4th)
- Utah State – Toomer 32 yard INT return (Morreale kick, 11:34 4th)
- Ball State – Nibbs 2 yard run (Neu pass good, 10:34 4th)
- Ball State – Oliver 2 yard pass from Neu (Neu pass failed, 5:07 4th)

Quarterback Anthony Calvillo and running back Profail Grier led Utah State University to a 42–33 victory over Ball State University. Calvillo, a senior who finished the 1993 NCAA season ranked ninth nationally in total offense, completed 25 of 39 passes for 286 yards and three touchdowns and was named the game's Most Valuable Player. Grier, a sophomore, rushed for 143 yards on 32 carries and ran for two touchdowns. The Aggies' offensive line played a pivotal role in the game by not allowing a quarterback sack, as the Utah State gained 429 total offensive yards in securing the victory.

Utah State led 21–0 at halftime. The Aggies gained 329 of their 491 yards in the first half, scoring on drives of 73, 82 and 68 yards to lead at the half against a Ball State defense that had only allowed 12 points in its previous three games. Additionally, the Aggies defense limited the Cardinal offense, which had averaged 357.4 yards per game during the season, to just 31 offensive yards in the first half.

In the second half, however, Ball State scored 33 points to close the half-time gap. Running back Mike Blair threw a two-yard pass to quarterback Mike Neu to cut the lead to 35–17 with seven seconds remaining in the third quarter. In the fourth quarter, Neu threw a touchdown pass to Mike Oliver to close the score to 42–33 for Utah State. After that score, however, Utah State was successful in running out the remaining time on the clock to secure the victory. While Ball State came into the 1993 Las Vegas Bowl as a predominantly running team, only 73 of its total 312 yards came on the ground.

The bowl victory was the first for Utah State in five tries.

== Aftermath ==
Utah State made just one more bowl game in the decade. They did not win another bowl game until 2012. Ball State won another MAC title in 1996, but lost. They did not return to a bowl game again until 2008.
