= 1993 Air Force Falcons football team =

American college football season

1993 Air Force Falcons football
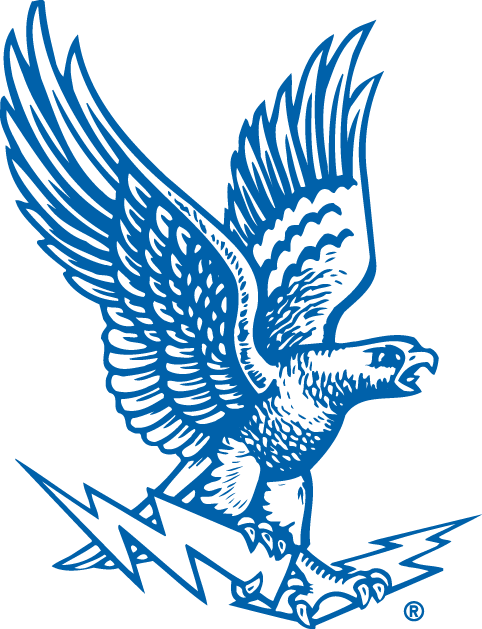
- Conference: Western Athletic Conference
- Record: 4–8 (1–7 WAC)
- Head coach: Fisher DeBerry (10th season)
- Offensive coordinator: Paul Hamilton (4th season)
- Offensive scheme: Wishbone triple option
- Defensive coordinator: Cal McCombs (4th season)
- Base defense: 3–4
- Captains: Mike Black; Scott Teigen; Wayne Young
- Home stadium: Falcon Stadium

1993 Western Athletic Conference football standings
	Conf.					Overall
Team	W		L		T	W		L		T
Fresno State +	6	–	2	–	0	8	–	4	–	0
Wyoming +	6	–	2	–	0	8	–	4	–	0
BYU +	6	–	2	–	0	6	–	6	–	0
Utah	5	–	3	–	0	7	–	6	–	0
Colorado State	5	–	3	–	0	5	–	6	–	0
New Mexico	4	–	4	–	0	6	–	5	–	0
San Diego State	4	–	4	–	0	6	–	6	–	0
Hawaii	3	–	5	–	0	6	–	6	–	0
Air Force	1	–	7	–	0	4	–	8	–	0
UTEP	0	–	8	–	0	1	–	11	–	0
+ – Conference co-champions

The 1993 Air Force Falcons football team represented the United States Air Force Academy as a member of the Western Athletic Conference (WAC) during the 1993 NCAA Division I-A football season. Led by tenth-year head coach Fisher DeBerry, the Falcons compiled an overall record of 4–8 with a mark of 1–7 in conference play, placing ninth in the WAC. The team played home games at Falcon Stadium in Colorado Springs, Colorado

== Schedule ==
Date	Opponent	Site	Result	Attendance	Source
September 4	Indiana State*	Falcon Stadium; Colorado Springs, CO	W 63–21		
September 11	at Colorado State	Hughes Stadium; Fort Collins, CO (rivalry)	L 5–8	24,093	
September 18	San Diego State	Falcon Stadium; Colorado Springs, CO	L 31–38	40,086	
September 25	at No. 21 BYU	Cougar Stadium; Provo, UT	L 3–30		
October 2	Wyoming	Falcon Stadium; Colorado Springs, CO	L 18–31	38,099	
October 9	at Navy*	Navy–Marine Corps Memorial Stadium; Annapolis, MD (Commander-in-Chief's Trophy)	L 24–28		
October 16	at Fresno State	Bulldog Stadium; Fresno, CA	L 20–33	41,031	
October 23	The Citadel*	Falcon Stadium; Colorado Springs, CO	W 35–0	39,702	
October 30	UTEP	Falcon Stadium; Colorado Springs, CO	W 31–10	24,472	
November 6	Army*	Falcon Stadium; Colorado Springs, CO (Commander-in-Chief's Trophy)	W 25–6		
November 13	at Utah	Robert Rice Stadium; Salt Lake City, UT	L 24–41	20,811	
November 20	at Hawaii	Aloha Stadium; Hawala, HI (rivalry)	L 17–45	38,991	
*Non-conference game; Rankings from AP Poll released prior to the game

== Roster ==
- TE Joe Lombardi, Sr.
