= 1993 Western Michigan Broncos football team =

American college football season

1993 Western Michigan Broncos football
- Conference: Mid-American Conference
- Record: 7–3–1 (6–1–1 MAC)
- Head coach: Al Molde (7th season)
- Offensive coordinator: Rob Kuhlman
- Defensive coordinator: Larry Edlund
- MVP: Jay McDonagh
- Home stadium: Waldo Stadium

1993 Mid-American Conference football standings
	Conf.					Overall
Team	W		L		T	W		L		T
Ball State $	7	–	0	–	1	8	–	3	–	1
Western Michigan	6	–	1	–	1	7	–	3	–	1
Bowling Green	5	–	1	–	2	6	–	3	–	2
Central Michigan	5	–	4	–	0	5	–	6	–	0
Akron	4	–	4	–	0	5	–	6	–	0
Ohio	4	–	5	–	0	4	–	7	–	0
Eastern Michigan	3	–	5	–	0	4	–	7	–	0
Toledo	3	–	5	–	0	4	–	7	–	0
Miami (OH)	3	–	6	–	0	4	–	7	–	0
Kent State	0	–	9	–	0	0	–	11	–	0
$ – Conference champion

The 1993 Western Michigan Broncos football team represented Western Michigan University in the Mid-American Conference (MAC) during the 1993 NCAA Division I-A football season. In their seventh season under head coach Al Molde, the Broncos compiled a 7–3–1 record (6–1–1 against MAC opponents), finished in second place in the MAC, and outscored their opponents, 237 to 187. The team played its home games at Waldo Stadium in Kalamazoo, Michigan.

The team's statistical leaders included Jay McDonagh with 1,974 passing yards, Dave Madsen with 571 rushing yards, and Andre Wallace with 599 receiving yards.

== Schedule ==
Date	Opponent	Site	Result	Attendance	Source
September 2	No. 3 Youngstown State*	Waldo Stadium; Kalamazoo, MI	L 13–17	29,084	
September 11	at Purdue*	Ross–Ade Stadium; West Lafayette, IN	L 13–28	57,670	
September 18	Akron	Waldo Stadium; Kalamazoo, MI	W 20–3		
September 25	Miami (OH)	Waldo Stadium; Kalamazoo, MI	W 17–0		
October 2	at Kent State	Dix Stadium; Kent, OH	W 27–21		
October 9	Central Michigan	Waldo Stadium; Kalamazoo, MI (rivalry)	L 18–23		
October 23	at Eastern Michigan	Rynearson Stadium; Ypsilanti, MI (rivalry)	W 21–20		
October 30	at Army*	Michie Stadium; West Point, NY	W 20–7		
November 6	at Ohio	Peden Stadium; Athens, OH	W 34–28		
November 13	Toledo	Waldo Stadium; Kalamazoo, MI	W 39–26		
November 20	at Bowling Green	Doyt Perry Stadium; Bowling Green, OH	T 14–14		
*Non-conference game; Rankings from The Sports Network Poll released prior to the game
