= 1993 New Mexico Lobos football team =

American college football season

1993 New Mexico Lobos football
- Conference: Western Athletic Conference
- Record: 6–5 (4–4 WAC)
- Head coach: Dennis Franchione (2nd season)
- Offensive coordinator: Matt Simon (2nd season)
- Offensive scheme: Multiple
- Defensive coordinator: Fred Bleil (2nd season)
- Base defense: 4–3
- Home stadium: University Stadium

1993 Western Athletic Conference football standings
	Conf.					Overall
Team	W		L		T	W		L		T
Fresno State +	6	–	2	–	0	8	–	4	–	0
Wyoming +	6	–	2	–	0	8	–	4	–	0
BYU +	6	–	2	–	0	6	–	6	–	0
Utah	5	–	3	–	0	7	–	6	–	0
Colorado State	5	–	3	–	0	5	–	6	–	0
New Mexico	4	–	4	–	0	6	–	5	–	0
San Diego State	4	–	4	–	0	6	–	6	–	0
Hawaii	3	–	5	–	0	6	–	6	–	0
Air Force	1	–	7	–	0	4	–	8	–	0
UTEP	0	–	8	–	0	1	–	11	–	0
+ – Conference co-champions

The 1993 New Mexico Lobos football team was an American football team that represented the University of New Mexico in the Western Athletic Conference (WAC) during the 1993 NCAA Division I-A football season. In their second season under head coach Dennis Franchione, the Lobos compiled a 6–5 record (4–4 against WAC opponents) and outscored opponents by a total of 335 to 256.

The team's statistical leaders included Stoney Case with 2,490 passing yards and 84 points scored, Winslow Oliver with 648 rushing yards, and Carl Winston with 766 receiving yards.

== Schedule ==
Date	Opponent	Site	Result	Attendance	Source
September 4	No. 19 BYU	University Stadium; Albuquerque, NM	L 31–34		
September 11	at TCU*	Amon G. Carter Stadium; Fort Worth, TX	L 34–35		
September 18	Fresno State	University Stadium; Albuquerque, NM	L 24–41	25,812	
September 25	New Mexico State*	University Stadium; Albuquerque, NM (rivalry)	W 42–7		
October 2	Hawaii^{†}	University Stadium; Albuquerque, NM	W 41–14	28,873	
October 9	at Utah	Robert Rice Stadium; Salt Lake City, UT	W 42–35	23,062	
October 23	at San Diego State	Jack Murphy Stadium; San Diego, CA	L 17–20	39,260	
October 30	at Colorado State	Hughes Stadium; Fort Collins, CO	L 20–21	17,270	
November 6	Idaho State*	University Stadium; Albuquerque, NM	W 39–13	22,049	
November 13	No. 23 Wyoming	University Stadium; Albuquerque, NM	W 10–7	18,219	
November 20	at UTEP	Sun Bowl; El Paso, TX	W 35–29	15,147	
*Non-conference game; ^{†}Homecoming; Rankings from AP Poll released prior to the game

== Roster ==
1993 New Mexico Lobos football team roster
Players
Coaches
Offense

Pos.	#	Name	Class
QB	25	Stoney Case	Jr
TE	88	David Sloan	Jr
RB	4	Eric Young	Jr

Defense

Pos.	#	Name	Class
DT	73	John Lisker	Jr
LB	7	Todd Williams	Jr

Special teams

Pos.	#	Name	Class
P		Mike Nesbitt	So

Head coach

- Dennis Franchione

Coordinators/assistant coaches

Legend

- (C) Team captain
- (S) Suspended
- (I) Ineligible
- Injured
- Redshirt
