= 1993 Toledo Rockets football team =

American college football season

1993 Toledo Rockets football
- Conference: Mid-American Conference
- Record: 4–7 (3–5 MAC)
- Head coach: Gary Pinkel (3rd season)
- Offensive coordinator: Mike Dunbar (2nd season)
- Offensive scheme: Pro-style
- Defensive coordinator: Dean Pees (4th season)
- Base defense: 4–3
- Home stadium: Glass Bowl

1993 Mid-American Conference football standings
	Conf.					Overall
Team	W		L		T	W		L		T
Ball State $	7	–	0	–	1	8	–	3	–	1
Western Michigan	6	–	1	–	1	7	–	3	–	1
Bowling Green	5	–	1	–	2	6	–	3	–	2
Central Michigan	5	–	4	–	0	5	–	6	–	0
Akron	4	–	4	–	0	5	–	6	–	0
Ohio	4	–	5	–	0	4	–	7	–	0
Eastern Michigan	3	–	5	–	0	4	–	7	–	0
Toledo	3	–	5	–	0	4	–	7	–	0
Miami (OH)	3	–	6	–	0	4	–	7	–	0
Kent State	0	–	9	–	0	0	–	11	–	0
$ – Conference champion

The 1993 Toledo Rockets football team was an American football team that represented the University of Toledo in the Mid-American Conference (MAC) during the 1993 NCAA Division I-A football season. In their third season under head coach Gary Pinkel, the Rockets compiled a 4–7 record (3–5 against MAC opponents), finished in a tie for seventh place in the MAC, and were outscored by all opponents by a combined total of 270 to 252.

The team's statistical leaders included Tim Kubiak with 970 passing yards, Wasean Tait with 656 rushing yards, and Scott Brunswick with 571 receiving yards.

== Schedule ==
Date	Opponent	Site	Result	Attendance	Source
September 4	at Indiana*	Memorial Stadium; Bloomington, IN	L 0–27	30,327	
September 18	Southern Illinois*	Glass Bowl; Toledo, OH	W 49–28	22,984	
September 25	Ohio	Glass Bowl; Toledo, OH	W 28–10		
October 2	at Bowling Green	Doyt Perry Stadium; Bowling Green, OH (rivalry)	L 10–17		
October 9	at Ball State	Ball State Stadium; Muncie, IN	L 30–31		
October 16	Miami (OH)	Glass Bowl; Toledo, OH	L 19–22		
October 23	Cincinnati*	Glass Bowl; Cincinnati, OH	L 24–31		
October 30	at Kent State	Dix Stadium; Kent, OH	W 45–27		
November 6	Central Michigan	Glass Bowl; Toledo, OH	L 7–38		
November 13	at Western Michigan	Waldo Stadium; Kalamazoo, MI	L 26–39		
November 19	Eastern Michigan	Glass Bowl; Toledo, OH	W 14–0		
*Non-conference game
