= 1993 Ball State Cardinals football team =

American college football season

1993 Ball State Cardinals football

MAC champion

Las Vegas Bowl, L 33–42 vs. Utah State
- Conference: Mid-American Conference
- Record: 8–3–1 (7–0–1 MAC)
- Head coach: Paul Schudel (9th season)
- Offensive coordinator: Kit Cartwright (1st season)
- Defensive coordinator: Tim Burke (2nd season)
- Home stadium: Ball State Stadium

1993 Mid-American Conference football standings
| | Conf. | | | | | Overall |
| Team | W | | L | | T | W | | L | | T |
|---|---|---|---|---|---|---|---|---|---|---|
| Ball State $ | 7 | – | 0 | – | 1 | 8 | – | 3 | – | 1 |
| Western Michigan | 6 | – | 1 | – | 1 | 7 | – | 3 | – | 1 |
| Bowling Green | 5 | – | 1 | – | 2 | 6 | – | 3 | – | 2 |
| Central Michigan | 5 | – | 4 | – | 0 | 5 | – | 6 | – | 0 |
| Akron | 4 | – | 4 | – | 0 | 5 | – | 6 | – | 0 |
| Ohio | 4 | – | 5 | – | 0 | 4 | – | 7 | – | 0 |
| Eastern Michigan | 3 | – | 5 | – | 0 | 4 | – | 7 | – | 0 |
| Toledo | 3 | – | 5 | – | 0 | 4 | – | 7 | – | 0 |
| Miami (OH) | 3 | – | 6 | – | 0 | 4 | – | 7 | – | 0 |
| Kent State | 0 | – | 9 | – | 0 | 0 | – | 11 | – | 0 |
$ – Conference champion

The 1993 Ball State Cardinals football team was an American football team that represented Ball State University in the Mid-American Conference (MAC) during the 1993 NCAA Division I-A football season. In its ninth season under head coach Paul Schudel, the team compiled an 8–3–1 record (7–0–1 against conference opponents), won the MAC championship, and lost to Utah State in the 1993 Las Vegas Bowl. The team played its home games at Ball State Stadium in Muncie, Indiana.

The team's statistical leaders included Mike Neu with 2,148 passing yards, Tony Nibbs with 777 rushing yards, Brian Oliver with 1,010 receiving yards, and Brian Oliver and Michael Blair each with 60 points scored.

== Schedule ==
| Date | Opponent | Site | Result | Attendance | Source |
|---|---|---|---|---|---|
| September 4 | at No. 6 Syracuse* | Carrier Dome; Syracuse, NY | L 12–35 | 45,090 | |
| September 11 | Illinois State* | Ball State Stadium; Muncie, IN | W 45–30 | | |
| September 18 | at Ohio | Peden Stadium; Athens, OH | W 24–16 | | |
| October 2 | at Central Michigan | Kelly/Shorts Stadium; Mount Pleasant, MI | W 20–17 | | |
| October 9 | Toledo | Ball State Stadium; Muncie, IN | W 31–30 | | |
| October 16 | at Cincinnati* | Nippert Stadium; Cincinnati, OH | L 12–44 | | |
| October 23 | Bowling Green | Ball State Stadium; Muncie, IN | T 26–26 | | |
| October 30 | at Eastern Michigan | Rynearson Stadium; Ypsilanti, MI | W 18–13 | | |
| November 6 | Miami (OH) | Ball State Stadium; Muncie, IN | W 21–0 | | |
| November 14 | at Akron | Rubber Bowl; Akron, OH | W 31–9 | | |
| November 20 | Kent State | Ball State Stadium; Muncie, IN | W 28–3 | | |
| December 17 | vs. Utah State* | Sam Boyd Silver Bowl; Whitney, NV (Las Vegas Bowl) | L 33–42 | 15,508 | |
*Non-conference game; Rankings from AP Poll released prior to the game
