= 1993 Hawaii Rainbow Warriors football team =

American college football season

1993 Hawaii Rainbow Warriors football
- Conference: Western Athletic Conference
- Record: 6–6 (3–5 WAC)
- Head coach: Bob Wagner (7th season)
- Offensive coordinator: Paul Johnson (7th season)
- Offensive scheme: Triple option
- Defensive coordinator: Chris Smeland (1st season)
- Base defense: 4–3
- Home stadium: Aloha Stadium

1993 Western Athletic Conference football standings
	Conf.					Overall
Team	W		L		T	W		L		T
Fresno State +	6	–	2	–	0	8	–	4	–	0
Wyoming +	6	–	2	–	0	8	–	4	–	0
BYU +	6	–	2	–	0	6	–	6	–	0
Utah	5	–	3	–	0	7	–	6	–	0
Colorado State	5	–	3	–	0	5	–	6	–	0
New Mexico	4	–	4	–	0	6	–	5	–	0
San Diego State	4	–	4	–	0	6	–	6	–	0
Hawaii	3	–	5	–	0	6	–	6	–	0
Air Force	1	–	7	–	0	4	–	8	–	0
UTEP	0	–	8	–	0	1	–	11	–	0
+ – Conference co-champions

The 1993 Hawaii Rainbow Warriors football team represented the University of Hawaiʻi at Mānoa in the Western Athletic Conference during the 1993 NCAA Division I-A football season. In their seventh season under head coach Bob Wagner, the Rainbow Warriors compiled a 6–6 record.

== Schedule ==
Date	Opponent	Site	Result	Attendance	Source
September 4	Middle Tennessee*	Aloha Stadium; Halawa, HI	W 35–14	41,753	
September 11	at BYU	Cougar Stadium; Provo, UT	L 38–41	65,771	
September 18	Kent State*	Aloha Stadium; Halawa, HI	W 49–17	38,931	
September 25	UTEP	Aloha Stadium; Halawa, HI	W 52–0	40,388	
October 2	at New Mexico	University Stadium; Albuquerque, NM	L 14–41	28,873	
October 9	San Diego State	Aloha Stadium; Halawa, HI	L 14–45	49,276	
October 23	at Wyoming	War Memorial Stadium; Laramie, WY (rivalry)	L 10–48	25,208	
November 6	Utah^{†}	Aloha Stadium; Halawa, HI	W 41–30	39,279	
November 13	at Fresno State	Bulldog Stadium; Fresno, CA (rivalry)	L 21–45	39,808	
November 20	Air Force	Aloha Stadium; Halawa, HI (rivalry)	W 45–17	38,991	
November 27	California*	Aloha Stadium; Halawa, HI	L 18–42	41,260	
December 4	Tulane*	Aloha Stadium; Halawa, HI	W 56–17	36,576	
*Non-conference game; ^{†}Homecoming
