= 1993 Southern Illinois Salukis football team =

American college football season

1993 Southern Illinois Salukis football
- Conference: Gateway Football Conference
- Record: 2–9 (1–5 Gateway)
- Head coach: Bob Smith (5th season)
- Home stadium: McAndrew Stadium

1993 Gateway Football Conference standings
	Conf.					Overall
Team	W		L		T	W		L		T
No. 13 Northern Iowa $^	5	–	1	–	0	8	–	4	–	0
Southwest Missouri State	4	–	2	–	0	7	–	4	–	0
Western Illinois	4	–	2	–	0	4	–	7	–	0
Illinois State	2	–	3	–	1	6	–	4	–	1
Eastern Illinois	2	–	3	–	1	3	–	7	–	1
Indiana State	2	–	4	–	0	4	–	7	–	0
Southern Illinois	1	–	5	–	0	2	–	9	–	0
$ – Conference champion; ^ – NCAA Division I-AA playoff participant; Rankings from The Sports Network poll

The 1993 Southern Illinois Salukis football team represented Southern Illinois University as a member of the Gateway Football Conference during the 1993 NCAA Division I-AA football season. They were led by fifth-year head coach Bob Smith and played their home games at McAndrew Stadium in Carbondale, Illinois. The Salukis finished the season with a 2–9 record overall and a 1–5 record in conference play.

== Schedule ==
Date	Opponent	Site	Result	Attendance	Source
September 11	Washburn*	McAndrew Stadium; Carbondale, IL	W 46–14	8,400	
September 18	at Toledo*	Glass Bowl; Toledo, OH	L 28–49	22,984	
September 25	at Arkansas State*	Indian Stadium; Jonesboro, AR	L 6–27	8,754	
October 2	at Northern Illinois*	Huskie Stadium; DeKalb, IL	L 15–45	14,852	
October 9	at Western Illinois	Hanson Field; Macomb, IL	L 13–14	8,743	
October 16	No. 21 Western Kentucky*	McAndrew Stadium; Carbondale, IL	L 24–51	7,200	
October 23	Southwest Missouri State	McAndrew Stadium; Carbondale, IL	L 17–22	12,100	
October 30	at Indiana State	Memorial Stadium; Terre Haute, IN	W 35–26	3,140	
November 6	Illinois State	McAndrew Stadium; Carbondale, IL	L 16–34	2,500	
November 13	at No. 13 Northern Iowa	UNI-Dome; Cedar Falls, IA	L 17–49	16,324	
November 20	Eastern Illinois	McAndrew Stadium; Carbondale, IL	L 35–42	1,500	
*Non-conference game; Rankings from The Sports Network Poll released prior to the game
