= Mike McCoy (American football coach) =

American football coach and player (born 1972)

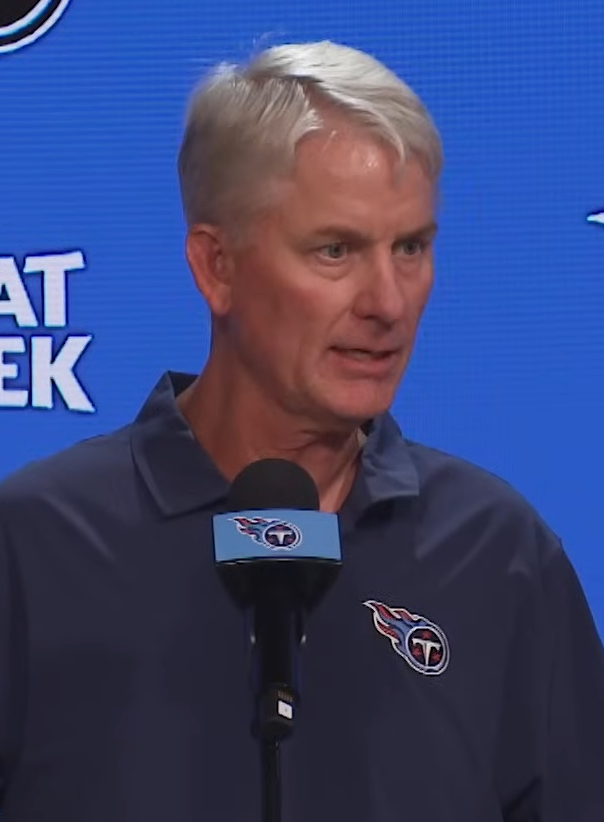
- McCoy with the Tennessee Titans in 2025

Las Vegas Raiders
- Title: Assistant head coach

Personal information
- Born: April 1, 1972 (age 54); San Francisco, California, U.S.
- Listed height: 6 ft 2 in (1.88 m)
- Listed weight: 204 lb (93 kg)

Career information
- Position: Quarterback
- High school: San Marin (Novato, California)
- College: Long Beach State (1990–1991); Utah (1992–1994)
- NFL draft: 1995: undrafted

Career history

Playing
- Denver Broncos (1995)*; Green Bay Packers (1995–1996)*; Amsterdam Admirals (1997); San Francisco 49ers (1997); Philadelphia Eagles (1998)*; Amsterdam Admirals (1998); Seattle Seahawks (1999)*; Calgary Stampeders (1999)
- * Offseason or practice squad member only

Coaching
- Carolina Panthers (2000–2008); Offensive assistant (2000); Wide receivers coach (2001); Offensive assistant (2002–2005); Quarterbacks coach (2006); Passing game coordinator & quarterbacks coach (2007–2008); Denver Broncos (2009–2012); Offensive coordinator & quarterbacks coach (2009); Offensive coordinator (2010–2012); San Diego Chargers (2013–2016) Head coach; Denver Broncos (2017) Offensive coordinator; Arizona Cardinals (2018) Offensive coordinator; Jacksonville Jaguars (2022–2024) Quarterbacks coach; Tennessee Titans (2025) Senior offensive assistant & interim head coach; Las Vegas Raiders (2026–present) Assistant head coach

Awards and highlights
- Second-team All-WAC (1993)

Career CFL statistics
- Passing attempts: 183
- Passing completions: 117
- Completion percentage: 63.9%
- TD–INT: 10–3
- Passing yards: 1,669
- Passer rating: 104.7
- Rushing yards: 110
- Rushing touchdowns: 1

Head coaching record
- Regular season: 29–46 (.387)
- Postseason: 1–1 (.500)
- Career: 30–47 (.390)
- Coaching profile at Pro Football Reference

Michael Patrick McCoy (born April 1, 1972) is an American professional football coach and former quarterback who is the assistant head coach for the Las Vegas Raiders of the National Football League (NFL). He has spent time as the quarterbacks coach for the Carolina Panthers and Jacksonville Jaguars, the offensive coordinator of the Denver Broncos and Arizona Cardinals, a senior offensive assistant and the interim head coach of the Tennessee Titans, and the head coach of the San Diego Chargers for four seasons from 2013 to 2016.

== Playing career ==
=== Long Beach State ===
After graduating from San Marin High School in Novato, California, McCoy attended California State University, Long Beach, where he redshirted his first year. During his redshirt freshman season in 1991, McCoy played in eight games for the Long Beach State 49ers, starting five of them. He completed 87 of 165 passes for 938 yards, seven touchdowns and three interceptions.

=== Utah ===
When Long Beach State discontinued its football program in December 1991, McCoy transferred to the University of Utah. In his first season with the Utes, McCoy served primarily as the backup to senior Frank Dolce. McCoy saw action in six games, starting two contests while Dolce was injured. He continued as the starter for the 1993 and 1994 seasons, with career totals at Utah of 7,404 passing yards, 49 touchdowns, and 23 interceptions for a rating of 146.1.

McCoy's collegiate career ended dramatically in 1994 when he threw a game-winning, five-yard touchdown pass to wide receiver Kevin Dyson in the final minute to give Utah a 16–13 win over Arizona in the Freedom Bowl. McCoy led the Utes to a season-ending top-10 national ranking.

=== Collegiate statistics ===
Year	Team	Games			Passing								Rushing			
Year	Team	GP	GS	Record	Cmp	Att	Pct	Yds	Avg	TD	Int	Rtg	Att	Yds	Avg	TD
1990	Long Beach	0	0	―	Redshirt											
1991	Long Beach	8	5	N/A	87	165	52.7	938	5.7	7	3	110.8	39	–58	–1.5	1
1992	Utah	6	2	1–1	48	85	56.5	509	4.9	0	2	102.1	33	–23	–0.7	1
1993	Utah	12	12	7–5	276	430	64.2	3,860	9.0	21	10	151.1	99	109	1.1	0
1994	Utah	11	11	9–2	247	381	64.8	3,035	8.0	28	11	150.2	75	69	0.9	1
Career		37	30	17–8	658	1,061	62.0	8,342	7.9	56	26	140.6	246	97	0.4	4

=== Professional ===
After going unselected in the 1995 NFL draft, McCoy signed with the Denver Broncos as a rookie free agent but was cut during the preseason. In November 1995, the Green Bay Packers signed him to their practice squad following injuries to Brett Favre and his backup Ty Detmer. McCoy also had stints with the Amsterdam Admirals, San Francisco 49ers, Philadelphia Eagles and Seattle Seahawks. McCoy played two years in the CFL with the Calgary Stampeders behind Dave Dickenson.

== Coaching career ==
=== Carolina Panthers ===
From 2000 to 2008, McCoy served on the Carolina Panthers coaching staff, appearing in Super Bowl XXXVIII with the team.

=== Denver Broncos ===
After the 2008 season, McCoy was hired to be the new offensive coordinator and quarterbacks coach of the Denver Broncos. In 2009, then-Broncos quarterback Kyle Orton enjoyed a career year under McCoy, posting career highs in virtually every passing category. The following year, the Broncos passing attack ranked seventh in the NFL, and Orton ranked fourth in the league in passing yards per game. McCoy revamped the Broncos offense in 2011 to accommodate Tim Tebow's skill-set, and the Broncos led the NFL in rushing.

On December 31, 2012, Chicago Bears head coach Lovie Smith was fired, and the Bears asked the Broncos for permission to interview McCoy for the head coach position. In addition to the Bears, the Arizona Cardinals, Buffalo Bills, San Diego Chargers, and Philadelphia Eagles also asked and were granted permission to interview McCoy for their vacant head coaching positions during the Broncos' playoff bye week. When asked about McCoy being a hot head coaching candidate, Denver head coach John Fox said McCoy was "a heck-of-a coach".

=== San Diego Chargers ===
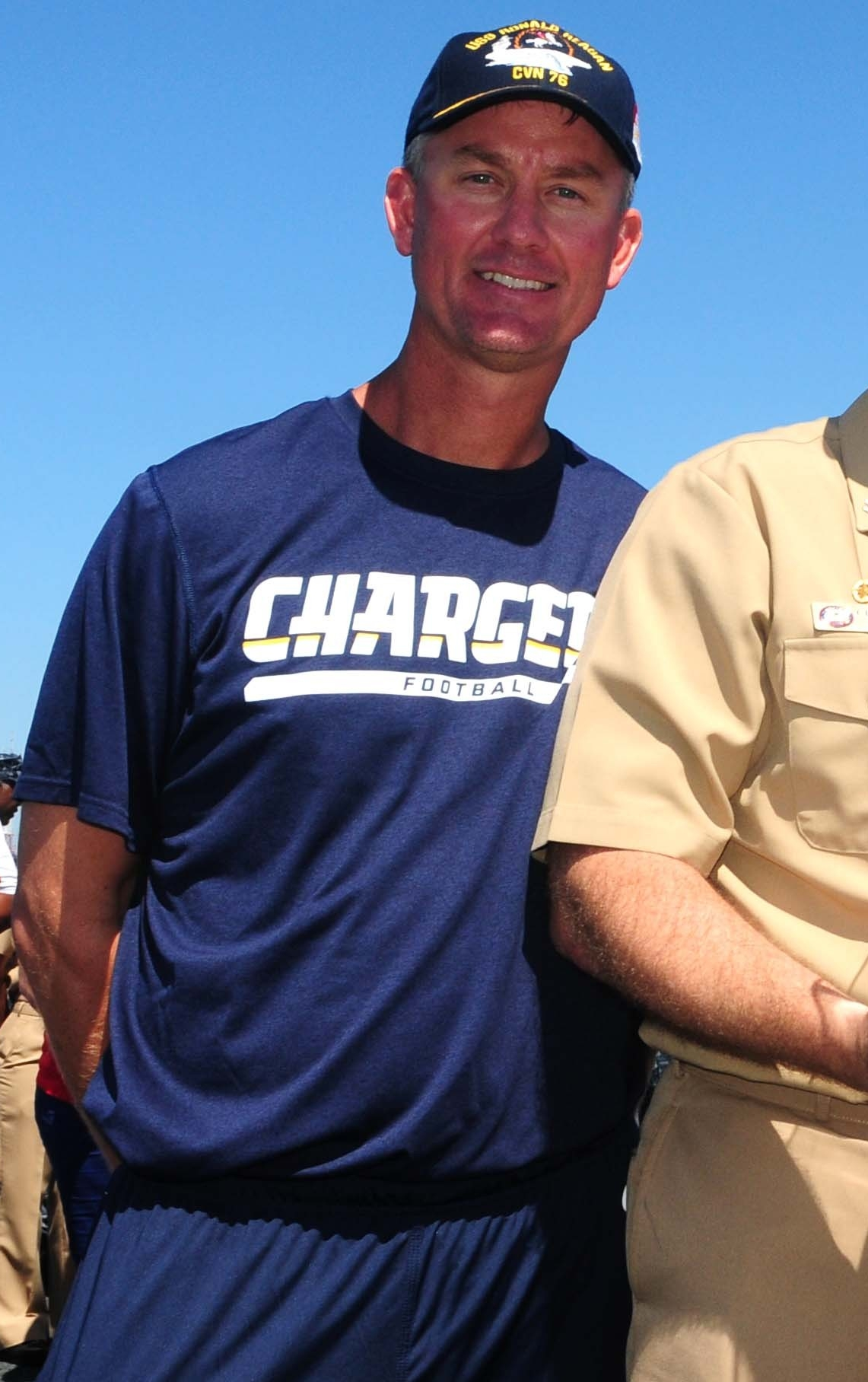
McCoy in 2013

On January 15, 2013, McCoy became the head coach of the San Diego Chargers, succeeding Norv Turner. McCoy became the youngest active head coach in the NFL and the second-youngest in team history as Al Saunders was 39 years old when he became head coach in 1986.

McCoy earned his first win as a head coach during Week 2 against the Philadelphia Eagles. Despite starting the season with a 4–6 record, the Chargers won five of their last six games, including four straight to end the season, and finished the regular season with a 9–7 record and qualifying for the playoffs as the #6-seed. The Chargers had not made the playoffs since 2009. They upset the Cincinnati Bengals on the road 27–10 during the Wild Card Round, marking the Chargers' first playoff victory since 2008. However, their win streak ended in the Divisional Round with a 24–17 road loss to the eventual AFC Champion Denver Broncos.

Despite their success in 2013, the Chargers went 9–7 and did not qualify for the playoffs the following season. They then went 4–12 and 5–11 in 2015 and 2016, respectively. On January 1, 2017, McCoy was fired hours after a 37–27 loss to the Kansas City Chiefs in the regular season finale. He finished his Chargers tenure with a 27–37 (.422) regular season record and a 1–1 (.500) playoff record for a combined record of 28–38 (.424). Less than two weeks later, the Chargers announced their intention to move to Los Angeles after 56 years in San Diego, making McCoy the last person to coach a professional football team in the city until Mike Martz coached the San Diego Fleet of the Alliance of American Football in 2019. To date, McCoy is the last person to coach an NFL team in the city.

=== Denver Broncos (second stint) ===
On January 13, 2017, McCoy was named the offensive coordinator of the Denver Broncos under new head coach Vance Joseph. On November 20, McCoy was fired after a six-game losing streak.

=== Arizona Cardinals ===
On January 25, 2018, McCoy was hired by the Arizona Cardinals to be their offensive coordinator under new head coach Steve Wilks.

On October 19, McCoy was fired after the team had offensive struggles and was replaced by Byron Leftwich.

=== Jacksonville Jaguars ===
On February 7, 2022, McCoy was hired by the Jacksonville Jaguars to serve as the team's quarterbacks coach under new head coach Doug Pederson.

=== Tennessee Titans ===
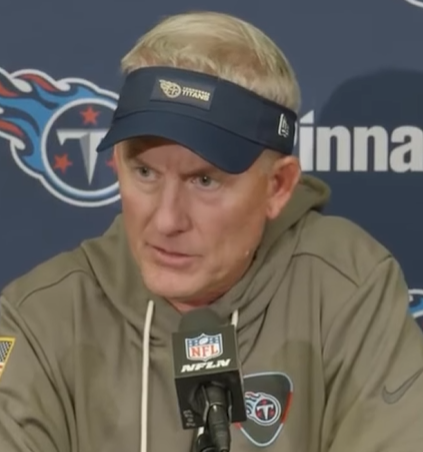
McCoy in 2025

On March 6, 2025, McCoy was hired by the Tennessee Titans as a senior offensive assistant under head coach Brian Callahan.

On October 13, McCoy was named the interim head coach after Callahan was fired. McCoy went 2–9 in that role as the Titans finished the season with a 3–14 record.

=== Las Vegas Raiders ===
On February 12, 2026, McCoy was hired by the Las Vegas Raiders to be their assistant head coach under new head coach Klint Kubiak.

== Head coaching record ==
Team	Year	Regular season					Postseason			
Team	Year	Won	Lost	Ties	Win %	Finish	Won	Lost	Win %	Result
SD	2013	9	7	0	.563	3rd in AFC West	1	1	.500	Lost to Denver Broncos in AFC Divisional Game
SD	2014	9	7	0	.563	3rd in AFC West	—	—	—	—
SD	2015	4	12	0	.250	4th in AFC West	—	—	—	—
SD	2016	5	11	0	.313	4th in AFC West	—	—	—	—
SD total		27	37	0	.422		1	1	.500	
TEN*	2025	2	9	0	.182	4th in AFC South	—	—	—	—
TEN total		2	9	0	.182		—	—	—	—
Total		29	46	0	.387		1	1	.500	

*Interim head coach

== Personal life ==
A native of Novato, California, McCoy and his wife, Kellie, have two children: Olivia and Luke.
