= 1993 UTEP Miners football team =

American college football season

1993 UTEP Miners football
- Conference: Western Athletic Conference
- Record: 1–11 (0–8 WAC)
- Head coach: David Lee (5th season; games 1–7); Charlie Bailey (1st season, games 8–12)
- Offensive coordinator: Johnnie Mac Hollinger (3rd season)
- Defensive coordinator: Charlie Bailey (3rd season)
- Home stadium: Sun Bowl

1993 Western Athletic Conference football standings
	Conf.					Overall
Team	W		L		T	W		L		T
Fresno State +	6	–	2	–	0	8	–	4	–	0
Wyoming +	6	–	2	–	0	8	–	4	–	0
BYU +	6	–	2	–	0	6	–	6	–	0
Utah	5	–	3	–	0	7	–	6	–	0
Colorado State	5	–	3	–	0	5	–	6	–	0
New Mexico	4	–	4	–	0	6	–	5	–	0
San Diego State	4	–	4	–	0	6	–	6	–	0
Hawaii	3	–	5	–	0	6	–	6	–	0
Air Force	1	–	7	–	0	4	–	8	–	0
UTEP	0	–	8	–	0	1	–	11	–	0
+ – Conference co-champions

The 1993 UTEP Miners football team was an American football team that represented the University of Texas at El Paso in the Western Athletic Conference during the 1993 NCAA Division I-A football season. After a 1–6 start to the season, fifth year head coach David Lee was fired and replaced with defensive coordinator Charlie Bailey. The Miners then ended the season with five more losses and finished with an 1–11 record.

== Schedule ==
Date	Opponent	Site	Result	Attendance	Source
September 4	at No. 13 Arizona*	Arizona Stadium; Tucson, AZ	L 6–24	44,414	
September 11	UNLV*	Sun Bowl; El Paso, TX	W 41–24	39,612	
September 18	at New Mexico State*	Aggie Memorial Stadium; Las Cruces, NM (rivalry)	L 14–31	31,839	
September 25	at Hawaii	Aloha Stadium; Halawa, HI	L 0–52	40,388	
October 2	at No. 16 North Carolina*	Kenan Memorial Stadium; Chapel Hill, NC	L 39–45	49,000	
October 9	Wyoming	Sun Bowl; El Paso, TX	L 26–33	34,263	
October 16	Utah^{†}	Sun Bowl; El Paso, TX	L 29–45	33,639	
October 30	at Air Force	Falcon Stadium; Colorado Springs, CO	L 10–31	24,472	
November 6	at Fresno State	Bulldog Stadium; Fresno, CA	L 10–30	34,265	
November 13	Colorado State	Sun Bowl; El Paso, TX	L 0–54	11,225	
November 20	New Mexico	Sun Bowl; El Paso, TX	L 29–35	15,147	
November 27	at BYU	Cougar Stadium; Provo, UT	L 16–47	63,649	
*Non-conference game; ^{†}Homecoming; Rankings from AP Poll released prior to the game
