= 1993 Western Illinois Leathernecks football team =

American college football season

1993 Western Illinois Leathernecks football
- Conference: Gateway Football Conference
- Record: 4–7 (4–2 GFC)
- Head coach: Randy Ball (4th season)
- Home stadium: Hanson Field

1993 Gateway Football Conference standings
	Conf.					Overall
Team	W		L		T	W		L		T
No. 13 Northern Iowa $^	5	–	1	–	0	8	–	4	–	0
Southwest Missouri State	4	–	2	–	0	7	–	4	–	0
Western Illinois	4	–	2	–	0	4	–	7	–	0
Illinois State	2	–	3	–	1	6	–	4	–	1
Eastern Illinois	2	–	3	–	1	3	–	7	–	1
Indiana State	2	–	4	–	0	4	–	7	–	0
Southern Illinois	1	–	5	–	0	2	–	9	–	0
$ – Conference champion; ^ – NCAA Division I-AA playoff participant; Rankings from The Sports Network poll

The 1993 Western Illinois Leathernecks football team represented Western Illinois University as a member of the Gateway Football Conference (GFC) during the 1993 NCAA Division I-AA football season. The team was led by fourth-year head coach Randy Ball and played their home games at Hanson Field in Macomb, Illinois. The Leathernecks finished the season with a 4–7 record overall and a 4–2 record in conference play.

== Schedule ==
Date	Opponent	Rank	Site	Result	Attendance	Source
September 4	Montana State*	No. 24	Hanson Field; Macomb, IL	L 29–16	8,309	
September 18	at Eastern Michigan*		Rynearson Stadium; Ypsilanti, MI	L 14–16	14,247	
September 25	at Eastern Illinois		O'Brien Stadium; Charleston, IL	W 28–14	6,561	
October 2	at No. 20 Illinois State		Hancock Stadium; Normal, IL	W 17–12		
October 9	Southern Illinois		Hanson Field; Macomb, IL	W 14–13	8,743	
October 16	at No. 11 UCF*		Florida Citrus Bowl; Orlando, FL	L 17–35	12,857	
October 23	No. 9 Northern Iowa		Hanson Field; Macomb, IL	W 25–23	11,376	
October 30	at Western Kentucky*		L. T. Smith Stadium; Bowling Green, KY	L 9–41	4,511	
November 6	Southwest Missouri State		Hanson Field; Macomb, IL	L 18–21		
November 13	St. Ambrose*		Hanson Field; Macomb, IL	L 25–27		
November 20	at Indiana State		Memorial Stadium; Terre Haute, IN	L 6–16		
*Non-conference game; Rankings from The Sports Network Poll released prior to the game
