= 1993 Kent State Golden Flashes football team =

American college football season

1993 Kent State Golden Flashes football
- Conference: Mid-American Conference
- Record: 0–11 (0–9 MAC)
- Head coach: Pete Cordelli (3rd season)
- Offensive coordinator: Shannon O'Brien (2nd season)
- Defensive coordinator: Jon Hoke (1st season)
- Home stadium: Dix Stadium

1993 Mid-American Conference football standings
	Conf.					Overall
Team	W		L		T	W		L		T
Ball State $	7	–	0	–	1	8	–	3	–	1
Western Michigan	6	–	1	–	1	7	–	3	–	1
Bowling Green	5	–	1	–	2	6	–	3	–	2
Central Michigan	5	–	4	–	0	5	–	6	–	0
Akron	4	–	4	–	0	5	–	6	–	0
Ohio	4	–	5	–	0	4	–	7	–	0
Eastern Michigan	3	–	5	–	0	4	–	7	–	0
Toledo	3	–	5	–	0	4	–	7	–	0
Miami (OH)	3	–	6	–	0	4	–	7	–	0
Kent State	0	–	9	–	0	0	–	11	–	0
$ – Conference champion

The 1993 Kent State Golden Flashes football team was an American football team that represented Kent State University in the Mid-American Conference (MAC) during the 1993 NCAA Division I-A football season. In their third and final season under head coach Pete Cordelli, the Golden Flashes compiled a 0–11 record (0–9 against MAC opponents), finished in last place in the MAC, and were outscored by all opponents by a combined total of 357 to 149.

The team's statistical leaders included Raeshuan Jernigan with 770 rushing yards, Kevin Shuman with 1,022 passing yards, and Brian Dusho with 890 receiving yards.

== Schedule ==
Date	Opponent	Site	Result	Attendance	Source
September 4	at Kentucky*	Commonwealth Stadium; Lexington, KY	L 0–35	55,800	
September 11	at Akron	Rubber Bowl; Akron, OH (Wagon Wheel)	L 7–42		
September 18	at Hawaii*	Aloha Stadium; Halawa, HI	L 17–49	38,931	
October 2	Western Michigan	Dix Stadium; Kent, OH	L 21–27		
October 9	at Eastern Michigan	Rynearson Stadium; Ypsilanti, MI	L 15–20		
October 16	at Ohio	Peden Stadium; Athens, OH	L 10–15		
October 23	Central Michigan	Dix Stadium; Kent, OH	L 28–33		
October 30	Toledo	Dix Stadium; Kent, OH	L 27–45		
November 6	at Bowling Green	Doyt Perry Stadium; Bowling Green, OH (Anniversary Award)	L 7–40		
November 13	Miami (OH)	Dix Stadium; Kent, OH	L 14–23		
November 20	at Ball State	Ball State Stadium; Muncie, IN	L 3–28		
*Non-conference game
