= 1993 Akron Zips football team =

American college football season

1993 Akron Zips football
- Conference: Mid-American Conference
- Record: 5–6 (4–4 MAC)
- Head coach: Gerry Faust (8th season)
- Defensive coordinator: Bob Junko (6th season)
- Home stadium: Rubber Bowl

1993 Mid-American Conference football standings
	Conf.					Overall
Team	W		L		T	W		L		T
Ball State $	7	–	0	–	1	8	–	3	–	1
Western Michigan	6	–	1	–	1	7	–	3	–	1
Bowling Green	5	–	1	–	2	6	–	3	–	2
Central Michigan	5	–	4	–	0	5	–	6	–	0
Akron	4	–	4	–	0	5	–	6	–	0
Ohio	4	–	5	–	0	4	–	7	–	0
Eastern Michigan	3	–	5	–	0	4	–	7	–	0
Toledo	3	–	5	–	0	4	–	7	–	0
Miami (OH)	3	–	6	–	0	4	–	7	–	0
Kent State	0	–	9	–	0	0	–	11	–	0
$ – Conference champion

The 1993 Akron Zips football team represented Akron University as a member of the Mid-American Conference (MAC) the 1993 NCAA Division I-A football season, Led by eighth-year head coach Gerry Faust, the Zips compiled an overall record of 5–6 with a mark of 4–4 in conference play, placing fifth in the MAC. Akron played home games at the Rubber Bowl in Akron, Ohio.

== Schedule ==
Date	Opponent	Site	Result	Attendance	Source
September 2	at Central Michigan	Kelly/Shorts Stadium; Mount Pleasant, MI	W 23–13		
September 11	Kent State	Rubber Bowl; Akron, OH (Wagon Wheel)	W 42–7		
September 18	at Western Michigan	Waldo Stadium; Kalamazoo, MI	L 3–20		
October 2	at Army*	Michie Stadium; West Point, NY	L 14–35		
October 9	Miami (OH)	Rubber Bowl; Akron, OH	W 31–13		
October 16	at Bowling Green	Doyt Perry Stadium; Bowling Green, OH	L 7–49		
October 23	at Temple*	Veterans Stadium; Philadelphia, PA	W 31–7		
October 30	at Ohio	Peden Stadium; Athens, OH	L 13–21		
November 6	Eastern Michigan	Rubber Bowl; Akron, OH	W 19–7		
November 13	Ball State	Rubber Bowl; Akron, OH	L 9–31		
November 20	No. 7 (I-AA) Youngstown State*	Rubber Bowl; Akron, OH (Steel Tire)	L 0–19	8,000	
*Non-conference game; Rankings from The Sports Network Poll released prior to the game
