= 1993 Southwest Missouri State Bears football team =

American college football season

1993 Southwest Missouri State Bears football
- Conference: Gateway Football Conference
- Record: 7–4 (4–2 GFC)
- Head coach: Jesse Branch (8th season)
- Captains: David Dow; Bobby Godwin
- Home stadium: Plaster Sports Complex

1993 Gateway Football Conference standings
	Conf.					Overall
Team	W		L		T	W		L		T
No. 13 Northern Iowa $^	5	–	1	–	0	8	–	4	–	0
Southwest Missouri State	4	–	2	–	0	7	–	4	–	0
Western Illinois	4	–	2	–	0	4	–	7	–	0
Illinois State	2	–	3	–	1	6	–	4	–	1
Eastern Illinois	2	–	3	–	1	3	–	7	–	1
Indiana State	2	–	4	–	0	4	–	7	–	0
Southern Illinois	1	–	5	–	0	2	–	9	–	0
$ – Conference champion; ^ – NCAA Division I-AA playoff participant; Rankings from The Sports Network poll

The 1993 Southwest Missouri State Bears football team represented Southwest Missouri State University (now known as Missouri State University) as a member of the Gateway Football Conference (GFC) during the 1993 NCAA Division I-AA football season. Led by eighth-year head coach Del Miller, the Bears compiled an overall record of 7–4, with a mark of 4–2 in conference play, and finished tied for second in the GFC.

== Schedule ==
Date	Opponent	Site	Result	Attendance	Source
September 4	Southeast Missouri State*	Plaster Sports Complex; Springfield, MO	W 24–10	12,442	
September 11	at Oklahoma State*	Lewis Field; Stillwater, OK	L 7–45	40,105	
September 18	at North Texas*	Fouts Field; Denton, TX	L 33–34		
September 25	Indiana State	Plaster Sports Complex; Springfield, MO	W 31–21		
October 2	No. 11 Northern Iowa	Plaster Sports Complex; Springfield, MO	L 14–20	11,849	
October 9	Illinois State	Plaster Sports Complex; Springfield, MO	W 40–28	8,955	
October 16	Jacksonville State*	Plaster Sports Complex; Springfield, MO	W 24–7	10,760	
October 23	at Southern Illinois	McAndrew Stadium; Carbondale, IL	W 22–17	12,100	
October 30	at Eastern Illinois	O'Brien Field; Charleston, IL	L 13–35	3,141	
November 6	at Western Illinois	Hanson Field; Macomb, IL	W 21–18		
November 13	Samford*	Plaster Sports Complex; Springfield, MO	W 42–14		
*Non-conference game; Rankings from The Sports Network Poll released prior to the game
