= 1993 Jacksonville State Gamecocks football team =

American college football season

1993 Jacksonville State Gamecocks football
- Conference: Independent
- Record: 3–7
- Head coach: Bill Burgess (9th season)
- Offensive coordinator: Charles Maniscalco (9th season)
- Defensive coordinator: Roland Houston (2nd season)
- Home stadium: Paul Snow Stadium

1993 NCAA Division II independents football records
	Conf.			Overall
Team	W	L	T	W		L		T
No. 2 New Haven ^		–		11	–	1	–	0
Wayne State (NE)		–		9	–	1	–	0
No. 5 Portland State ^		–		8	–	3	–	0
Wofford		–		7	–	3	–	1
Michigan Tech		–		6	–	4	–	0
Gannon		–		6	–	4	–	0
Kentucky Wesleyan		–		6	–	4	–	0
Mercyhurst		–		5	–	5	–	0
West Texas A&M		–		3	–	6	–	0
Southern Connecticut State		–		3	–	7	–	1
American International		–		3	–	7	–	0
Jacksonville State		–		3	–	7	–	0
Sacred Heart		–		3	–	7	–	0
Springfield		–		3	–	7	–	0
Lees–McRae		–		2	–	6	–	1
Kentucky State		–		2	–	9	–	0
^ – NCAA Division II playoff participant; Rankings from NCAA Division II Football Committee poll

The 1993 Jacksonville State Gamecocks football team represented Jacksonville State University as an independent during the 1993 NCAA Division II football season. Led by ninth-year head coach Bill Burgess, the Gamecocks compiled a record of 3–7. Jacksonville State played home games at Paul Snow Stadium in Jacksonville, Alabama.

== Schedule ==
Date	Time	Opponent	Site	Result	Attendance	Source
September 4	7:00 pm	Henderson State	Paul Snow Stadium; Jacksonville, AL	W 12–7	6,822	
September 11	7:00 pm	Alabama A&M	Paul Snow Stadium; Jacksonville, AL	W 44–18	15,000	
September 18	6:30 pm	at No. 14 Northern Iowa	UNI-Dome; Cedar Falls, IA	L 14–35	11,324	
September 25	12:00 pm	at James Madison	Bridgeforth Stadium; Harrisonburg, VA	L 14–35	7,000	
October 2	5:00 pm	at No. 25 Western Kentucky	L. T. Smith Stadium; Bowling Green, KY	L 7–12	8,800	
October 9	2:00 pm	Fort Valley State	Paul Snow Stadium; Jacksonville, AL	W 27–13	11,200	
October 16	2:00 pm	at Southwest Missouri State	Plaster Sports Complex; Springfield, MO	L 7–24	10,760	
October 23	2:35 pm	at No. 8 Montana	Washington–Grizzly Stadium; Missoula, MT	L 7–37	11,561	
October 30	1:00 pm	at No. 20 Alcorn State	Jack Spinks Stadium; Lorman, MS	L 36–41	5,000	
November 13	2:00 pm	Central State (OH)	Paul Snow Stadium; Jacksonville, AL	L 0–22	7,817	
Rankings from The Sports Network Poll released prior to the game; All times are in Central time
