= 1993 Fresno State Bulldogs football team =

American college football season

1993 Fresno State Bulldogs football
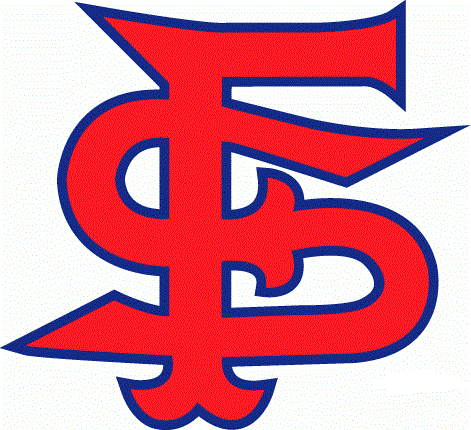

WAC co-champion

Aloha Bowl, L 30–41 vs. Colorado
- Conference: Western Athletic Conference
- Record: 8–4 (6–2 WAC)
- Head coach: Jim Sweeney (16th season)
- Offensive coordinator: Jeff Tedford (1st season)
- Defensive coordinator: Willy Robinson (2nd season)
- Home stadium: Bulldog Stadium

1993 Western Athletic Conference football standings
	Conf.					Overall
Team	W		L		T	W		L		T
Fresno State +	6	–	2	–	0	8	–	4	–	0
Wyoming +	6	–	2	–	0	8	–	4	–	0
BYU +	6	–	2	–	0	6	–	6	–	0
Utah	5	–	3	–	0	7	–	6	–	0
Colorado State	5	–	3	–	0	5	–	6	–	0
New Mexico	4	–	4	–	0	6	–	5	–	0
San Diego State	4	–	4	–	0	6	–	6	–	0
Hawaii	3	–	5	–	0	6	–	6	–	0
Air Force	1	–	7	–	0	4	–	8	–	0
UTEP	0	–	8	–	0	1	–	11	–	0
+ – Conference co-champions

The 1993 Fresno State Bulldogs football team represented California State University, Fresno as a member of the Western Athletic Conference (WAC) during the 1993 NCAA Division I-A football season. Led by 16th-year head coach Jim Sweeney, Fresno State compiled an overall record of 8–4 with a mark of 6–2 in conference play, sharing the WAC title with BYU and Wyoming. The Bulldogs played their home games at Bulldog Stadium in Fresno, California.

Fresno State was invited to the Aloha Bowl, where they lost to No. 17 Colorado, 41–30.

== Schedule ==
Date	Opponent	Rank	Site	Result	Attendance
September 4	at Baylor*	No. 24	Floyd Casey Stadium; Waco, TX	L 39–42	36,690
September 11	Oregon State*		Bulldog Stadium; Fresno, CA	W 48–30	40,048
September 18	at New Mexico		University Stadium; Albuquerque, NM	W 41–24	25,812
September 25	Utah State*		Bulldog Stadium; Fresno, CA	W 30–14	41,031
October 9	at Colorado State		Hughes Stadium; Fort Collins, CO	L 32–34	23,812
October 16	Air Force		Bulldog Stadium; Fresno, CA	W 33–20	41,031
October 23	at BYU		Cougar Stadium; Provo, UT	W 48–45	65,816
October 30	at Wyoming		War Memorial Stadium; Laramie, WY	L 28–32	16,895
November 6	UTEP		Bulldog Stadium; Fresno, CA	W 30–10	34,265
November 13	Hawaii		Bulldog Stadium; Fresno, CA (rivalry)	W 45–21	39,808
November 20	San Diego State		Bulldog Stadium; Fresno, CA (rivalry)	W 63–37	41,031
December 25	at No. 17 Colorado*	No. 25	Aloha Stadium; Halawa, HI (Aloha Bowl)	L 30–41	44,009
*Non-conference game; Rankings from AP Poll released prior to the game

== Team players in the NFL ==
The following were selected in the 1994 NFL draft.

Player	Position	Round	Overall	NFL team
Trent Dilfer	Quarterback	1	6	Tampa Bay Buccaneers
Tydus Winans	Wide receiver	3	68	Washington Redskins
Malcolm Floyd	Wide receiver	3	101	Houston Oilers
James Burton	Defensive back	5	151	Kansas City Chiefs
Anthony Daigle	Running back	6	185	Kansas City Chiefs

The following finished their college career in 1993, were not drafted, but played in the NFL.

Player	Position	First NFL team
Ron Rivers	Running back	1995 Detroit Lions
