= 1993 Ohio Bobcats football team =

American college football season

1993 Ohio Bobcats football
- Conference: Mid-American Conference
- Record: 4–7 (4–5 MAC)
- Head coach: Tom Lichtenberg (4th season)
- Home stadium: Peden Stadium

1993 Mid-American Conference football standings
	Conf.					Overall
Team	W		L		T	W		L		T
Ball State $	7	–	0	–	1	8	–	3	–	1
Western Michigan	6	–	1	–	1	7	–	3	–	1
Bowling Green	5	–	1	–	2	6	–	3	–	2
Central Michigan	5	–	4	–	0	5	–	6	–	0
Akron	4	–	4	–	0	5	–	6	–	0
Ohio	4	–	5	–	0	4	–	7	–	0
Eastern Michigan	3	–	5	–	0	4	–	7	–	0
Toledo	3	–	5	–	0	4	–	7	–	0
Miami (OH)	3	–	6	–	0	4	–	7	–	0
Kent State	0	–	9	–	0	0	–	11	–	0
$ – Conference champion

The 1993 Ohio Bobcats football team was an American football team that represented Ohio University in the Mid-American Conference (MAC) during the 1993 NCAA Division I-A football season. In their fourth season under head coach Tom Lichtenberg, the Bobcats compiled a 4–7 record (4–5 against MAC opponents), finished in sixth place in the MAC, and were outscored by all opponents by a combined total of 282 to 134. They played their home games in Peden Stadium in Athens, Ohio.

== Schedule ==
Date	Opponent	Site	Result	Attendance	Source
September 4	at No. 16 North Carolina*	Kenan Memorial Stadium; Chapel Hill, NC	L 3–44	35,000	
September 11	at Central Michigan	Kelly/Shorts Stadium; Mount Pleasant, MI	L 0–38		
September 18	Ball State	Peden Stadium; Athens, OH	L 16–24		
September 25	at Toledo	Glass Bowl; Toledo, OH	L 10–28		
October 2	at No. 21 Virginia*	Scott Stadium; Charlottesville, VA	L 7–41	36,300	
October 9	Bowling Green	Peden Stadium; Athens, OH	L 0–20		
October 16	Kent State	Peden Stadium; Athens, OH	W 15–10		
October 23	at Miami (OH)	Yager Stadium; Oxford, OH (rivalry)	W 22–20		
October 30	Akron	Peden Stadium; Athens, OH	W 21–13		
November 6	Western Michigan	Peden Stadium; Athens, OH	L 28–34		
November 13	at Eastern Michigan	Rynearson Stadium; Ypsilanti, MI	W 12–10		
*Non-conference game; Rankings from AP Poll released prior to the game
