= 1993 Northern Iowa Panthers football team =

American college football season

1993 Northern Iowa Panthers football

Gateway champion

NCAA Division I-AA First Round, L 21–27 ^{2OT} vs. Boston University
- Conference: Gateway Football Conference

Ranking
- Sports Network: No. 13
- Record: 8–4 (5–1 Gateway)
- Head coach: Terry Allen (5th season)
- Defensive coordinator: Ardell Wiegandt (5th season)
- Home stadium: UNI-Dome

1993 Gateway Football Conference standings
	Conf.					Overall
Team	W		L		T	W		L		T
No. 13 Northern Iowa $^	5	–	1	–	0	8	–	4	–	0
Southwest Missouri State	4	–	2	–	0	7	–	4	–	0
Western Illinois	4	–	2	–	0	4	–	7	–	0
Illinois State	2	–	3	–	1	6	–	4	–	1
Eastern Illinois	2	–	3	–	1	3	–	7	–	1
Indiana State	2	–	4	–	0	4	–	7	–	0
Southern Illinois	1	–	5	–	0	2	–	9	–	0
$ – Conference champion; ^ – NCAA Division I-AA playoff participant; Rankings from The Sports Network poll

The 1993 Northern Iowa Panthers football team was an American football team that represented the University of Northern Iowa as a member of the Gateway Football Conference (Gateway Conference) during the 1993 NCAA Division I-AA football season. In its fifth season under head coach Terry Allen, the team compiled an 8–4 record (5–1 in conference games), outscored opponents by a total of 350 to 238, and won the Gateway Conference championship for the fourth consecutive year. Northern Iowa advanced to the NCAA Division I-AA playoff, where the Panthers lost in the first round to Boston University.

Senior quarterback Kurt Warner tallied 2,484 passing yards and 16 touchdowns in the regular season and was selected as the Gateway Conference offensive player of the year. Linebacker Andre Allen was selected as the Gateway Conference defensive player of the year and as a first-team player on the Kodak Division I-AA All-America team. Terry Allen was selected as the Gateway Conference coach of the year. Seven Northern Iowa players were honored as first-team players on the 1993 all-Gateway football team: Allen; Warner; tight end Matt Harken; offensive tackle John Herrin; defensive lineman Tony Monroe; wide receiver and punter Tim Mosley; and center Donald Mumma.

The team played its home games at the UNI-Dome in Cedar Falls, Iowa.

== Schedule ==
Date	Time	Opponent	Rank	Site	TV	Result	Attendance	Source
September 4	7:00 pm	at No. 7 McNeese State*	No. 4	Cowboy Stadium; Lake Charles, LA		L 10–27	19,572	
September 11	1:00 pm	at Wyoming*	No. 10	War Memorial Stadium; Laramie, WY		L 42–45	17,827	
September 18	6:30 pm	Jacksonville State*	No. 14	UNI-Dome; Cedar Falls, IA		W 35–14	11,324	
September 25	1:00 pm	Southwest Texas State*	No. 14	UNI-Dome; Cedar Falls, IA		W 34–13	12,538	
October 2	7:00 pm	at Southwest Missouri State	No. 11	Plaster Sports Complex; Springfield, MO		W 20–14	11,849	
October 9	1:30 pm	Indiana State^{†}	No. 11	UNI-Dome; Cedar Falls, IA		W 17–10	14,431	
October 16	6:30 pm	Eastern Illinois	No. 9	UNI-Dome; Cedar Falls, IA		W 31–27	10,168	
October 23	1:30 pm	at Western Illinois	No. 9	Hanson Field; Macomb, IL		L 23–25	11,376	
October 30	1:30 pm	at Illinois State	No. 17	Hancock Stadium; Normal, IL		W 20–19	5,841	
November 6	1:30 pm	Moorhead State*	No. 15	UNI-Dome; Cedar Falls, IA		W 48–0	11,511	
November 13	1:30 pm	Southern Illinois	No. 13	UNI-Dome; Cedar Falls, IA		W 49–17	16,324	
November 27	12:00 pm	at No. 6 Boston University*	No. 13	Nickerson Field; Boston, MA (NCAA Division I-AA First Round)	SCA	L 21–27 ^{2OT}	6,882	
*Non-conference game; ^{†}Homecoming; Rankings from The Sports Network Poll released prior to the game; All times are in Central time

== Roster ==
1993 Northern Iowa Panthers football team roster
Players
Coaches
Offense

Pos.	#	Name	Class
WR	2	Tim Mosley	Sr
QB	7	Brett O’Donnell	Jr
WR	8	Marcus Easter	Fr
QB	13	Kurt Warner	Sr
HB	28	Sylvester Brown	Jr
WR	31	Anthony Taylor	Sr
FB	32	Jason Hamrock	So
HB	34	Ed Threatt	Sr
FB	42	Javier Pena	Sr
C	52	Scott Klahn	Sr
C	60	Donald Mumma	Jr
OL	64	Josh Toben	So
OL	67	John Pilcher	So
OL	68	Jason Reading	Fr
OL	69	John Lee	Sr
OL	72	Dan Bower	So
OL	76	Michael Hudnutt	Sr
OL	79	John Herrin	Sr
WR	80	Delond Bush	So
TE	81	Matt Harkin	So
WR	82	Jacob Kothe	So
TE	87	Mike Anderson	Jr
WR	88	Matt Lippman	Jr

Defense

Pos.	#	Name	Class

Special teams

Pos.	#	Name	Class
PK	27	Jeremy Norris	Jr
PK	38	Scott Obermeier	So

Head coach

- Terry Allen

Coordinators/assistant coaches

- Ardell Wiegandt (Defensive coordinator)

Legend

- (C) Team captain
- (S) Suspended
- (I) Ineligible
- Injured
- Redshirt

Roster

== Awards and honors ==
Seven Northern Iowa players were honored as first-team players on the 1993 all-Gateway football team: quarterback Kurt Warner; linebacker Andre Allen; tight end Matt Harken; offensive tackle John Herrin; defensive lineman Tony Monroe; wide receiver and punter Tim Mosley; and center Donald Mumma. Four others were named to the second team: defensive backs Myron Glass, Jason McCleary, and Joseph Wallace; offensive guard Michael Hudnutt; and running back Jeff Stovall. Four also received honorable mention: defensive back Todd Harrington; linebackers D. Minniewather and Paul Wolf; and defensive lineman Casey Smith.

Warner was named the conference offensive player of the year; Allen was named defensive player of the year; and Terry Allen was named Gateway coach of the year.

Several Northern Iowa players also received player of the week honors: Warner (twice); Allen (once); safety Jason McCleary (once); wide receiver Tim Mosley (twice); center D.J. Mumma (twice); and running back Jeff Stovall (once).

== Professional football ==
Quarterback Kurt Warner went on to a career in the National Football League (NFL), playing for the St. Louis Rams, New York Giants, and Arizona Cardinals.
