= 1993 Miami Redskins football team =

American college football season

1993 Miami Redskins football
- Conference: Mid-American Conference
- Record: 4–7 (3–6 MAC)
- Head coach: Randy Walker (4th season)
- Offensive coordinator: Kevin Wilson (2nd season)
- Defensive coordinator: Tim Carras (4th season)
- Home stadium: Yager Stadium

1993 Mid-American Conference football standings
	Conf.					Overall
Team	W		L		T	W		L		T
Ball State $	7	–	0	–	1	8	–	3	–	1
Western Michigan	6	–	1	–	1	7	–	3	–	1
Bowling Green	5	–	1	–	2	6	–	3	–	2
Central Michigan	5	–	4	–	0	5	–	6	–	0
Akron	4	–	4	–	0	5	–	6	–	0
Ohio	4	–	5	–	0	4	–	7	–	0
Eastern Michigan	3	–	5	–	0	4	–	7	–	0
Toledo	3	–	5	–	0	4	–	7	–	0
Miami (OH)	3	–	6	–	0	4	–	7	–	0
Kent State	0	–	9	–	0	0	–	11	–	0
$ – Conference champion

The 1993 Miami Redskins football team was an American football team that represented Miami University in the Mid-American Conference (MAC) during the 1993 NCAA Division I-A football season. In its fourth season under head coach Randy Walker, the team compiled a 4–7 record (3–6 against MAC opponents), finished in ninth place in the MAC, and were outscored by all opponents by a combined total of 248 to 186.

The team's statistical leaders included Danny Smith with 982 passing yards, Deland McCullough with 612 rushing yards, and Jim Clement with 426 receiving yards.

== Schedule ==
Date	Opponent	Site	Result
September 11	Southwestern Louisiana*	Yager Stadium; Oxford, OH	W 29–28
September 18	at Cincinnati*	Nippert Stadium; Cincinnati, OH (rivalry)	L 23–30
September 25	at Western Michigan	Waldo Stadium; Kalamazoo, MI	L 0–17
October 2	Eastern Michigan	Yager Stadium; Oxford, OH	L 7–15
October 9	at Akron	Rubber Bowl; Akron, OH	L 13–31
October 16	at Toledo	Glass Bowl; Toledo, OH	W 22–19
October 23	Ohio	Yager Stadium; Oxford, OH (rivalry)	L 20–22
October 30	Bowling Green	Yager Stadium; Oxford, OH	L 25–30
November 6	at Ball State	Ball State Stadium; Muncie, IN	L 0–21
November 13	at Kent State	Dix Stadium; Kent, OH	W 23–14
November 20	Central Michigan	Yager Stadium; Oxford, OH	W 24–21
*Non-conference game
