= Paul Schudel =

American football player and coach (born 1944)

Biographical details
- Born: July 2, 1944 (age 82); Swanton, Ohio, U.S.

Playing career
- 1963–1965: Miami (OH)
- Position: Tackle

Coaching career (HC unless noted)
- 1966–1967: Miami (OH) (GA)
- 1968–1969: New Hampshire (OC/OL)
- 1970–1971: Colorado State (OC/OL)
- 1972–1973: William & Mary (OC)
- 1974: Syracuse (OC)
- 1975–1984: Michigan (assistant)
- 1985–1994: Ball State
- 1995–1996: Illinois (OC)
- 1997–2000: Virginia (OL)
- 2001–2003: Central Connecticut
- 2004–2009: Albion (OL)
- 2010: Elancourt Templiers
- 2010-2011: McKendree (LB)
- 2013: Stuttgart Scorpions (OC/OL)

Head coaching record
- Overall: 70–69–4
- Bowls: 0–2

Accomplishments and honors

Championships
- 2 MAC (1989, 1993)

Awards
- 2× MAC Coach of the Year (1989, 1993)

Paul Schudel (born July 2, 1944) is an American former football player and coach. He served as the head football coach at Ball State University from 1985 to 1994 and at Central Connecticut State University from 2001 to 2003, compiling a career college football record of 70–69–4.

== Coaching career ==
Schudel was the twelfth head football coach at Ball State University, in Muncie, Indiana, serving for ten seasons, from 1985 to 1994, and compiling a record of 60–48–4.

Schudel was the tenth head football coach at Central Connecticut State University, in New Britain, Connecticut, serving for three seasons, from 2001 to 2003, and compiling a record of 10–21.

== Head coaching record ==
Year	Team	Overall	Conference	Standing	Bowl/playoffs
Ball State Cardinals (Mid-American Conference) (1985–1994)
1985	Ball State	4–7	3–6	T–6th	
1986	Ball State	6–5	5–4	T–4th	
1987	Ball State	4–7	3–5	8th	
1988	Ball State	8–3	5–3	T–3rd	
1989	Ball State	7–3–2	6–1–1	1st	L California
1990	Ball State	7–4	5–3	T–3rd	
1991	Ball State	6–5	4–4	T–5th	
1992	Ball State	5–6	5–4	6th	
1993	Ball State	8–3–1	7–0–1	1st	L Las Vegas
1994	Ball State	5–5–1	5–3–1	5th	
Ball State:		60–48–4	48–33–3		
Central Connecticut Blue Devils (Northeast Conference) (2001–2003)
2001	Central Connecticut	2–7	2–5	7th	
2002	Central Connecticut	5–6	3–4	5th	
2003	Central Connecticut	3–8	2–5	7th	
Central Connecticut:		10–21	7–14		
Total:		70–69–4			
National championship Conference title Conference division title or championship game berth
