= 1993 Bowling Green Falcons football team =

American college football season

1993 Bowling Green Falcons football
- Conference: Mid-American Conference
- Record: 6–3–2 (5–1–2 MAC)
- Head coach: Gary Blackney (3rd season)
- Defensive coordinator: Paul Ferraro (3rd season)
- Home stadium: Doyt Perry Stadium

1993 Mid-American Conference football standings
	Conf.					Overall
Team	W		L		T	W		L		T
Ball State $	7	–	0	–	1	8	–	3	–	1
Western Michigan	6	–	1	–	1	7	–	3	–	1
Bowling Green	5	–	1	–	2	6	–	3	–	2
Central Michigan	5	–	4	–	0	5	–	6	–	0
Akron	4	–	4	–	0	5	–	6	–	0
Ohio	4	–	5	–	0	4	–	7	–	0
Eastern Michigan	3	–	5	–	0	4	–	7	–	0
Toledo	3	–	5	–	0	4	–	7	–	0
Miami (OH)	3	–	6	–	0	4	–	7	–	0
Kent State	0	–	9	–	0	0	–	11	–	0
$ – Conference champion

The 1993 Bowling Green Falcons football team was an American football team that represented Bowling Green University in the Mid-American Conference (MAC) during the 1993 NCAA Division I-A football season. In their third season under head coach Gary Blackney, the Falcons compiled a 6–3–2 record (5–1–2 against MAC opponents), finished in third place in the MAC, and outscored their opponents by a combined total of 268 to 173.

The team's statistical leaders included Ryan Henry with 2,243 passing yards, Zeb Jackson with 952 rushing yards, and Rameir Martin with 876 receiving yards.

== Schedule ==
Date	Opponent	Site	Result	Attendance	Source
September 4	at Virginia Tech*	Lane Stadium; Blacksburg, VA	L 16–33	37,737	
September 11	Cincinnati*	Doyt Perry Stadium; Bowling Green, OH	W 21–7		
September 25	at Navy*	Navy–Marine Corps Memorial Stadium; Annapolis, MD	L 20–27		
October 2	Toledo	Doyt Perry Stadium; Bowling Green, OH (rivalry)	W 17–10		
October 9	at Ohio	Peden Stadium; Athens, OH	W 20–0		
October 16	Akron	Doyt Perry Stadium; Bowling Green, OH	W 49–7		
October 23	at Ball State	Ball State Stadium; Muncie, IN	T 26–26		
October 30	at Miami (OH)	Yager Stadium; Oxford, OH	W 30–25		
November 6	Kent State	Doyt Perry Stadium; Bowling Green, OH (Anniversary Award)	W 40–7		
November 13	at Central Michigan	Kelly/Shorts Stadium; Mount Pleasant, MI	L 15–17		
November 20	Western Michigan	Doyt Perry Stadium; Bowling Green, OH	T 14–14		
*Non-conference game
