= 1993 Eastern Illinois Panthers football team =

American college football season

1993 Eastern Illinois Panthers football
- Conference: Gateway Football Conference
- Record: 3–7–1 (2–3–1 GFC)
- Head coach: Bob Spoo (7th season)
- Offensive coordinator: Roy Wittke (4th season)
- Home stadium: O'Brien Stadium

1993 Gateway Football Conference standings
	Conf.					Overall
Team	W		L		T	W		L		T
No. 13 Northern Iowa $^	5	–	1	–	0	8	–	4	–	0
Southwest Missouri State	4	–	2	–	0	7	–	4	–	0
Western Illinois	4	–	2	–	0	4	–	7	–	0
Illinois State	2	–	3	–	1	6	–	4	–	1
Eastern Illinois	2	–	3	–	1	3	–	7	–	1
Indiana State	2	–	4	–	0	4	–	7	–	0
Southern Illinois	1	–	5	–	0	2	–	9	–	0
$ – Conference champion; ^ – NCAA Division I-AA playoff participant; Rankings from The Sports Network poll

The 1993 Eastern Illinois Panthers football team represented Eastern Illinois University during the 1993 NCAA Division I-AA football season. The Panthers played their home games at O'Brien Stadium in Charleston, Illinois.

== Schedule ==
Date	Opponent	Site	Result	Attendance	Source
September 2	at Murray State*	Roy Stewart Stadium; Murray, KY	W 34–17		
September 11	at No. 4 McNeese State*	Cowboy Stadium; Lake Charles, LA	L 7–49	19,579	
September 18	at Navy*	Navy–Marine Corps Memorial Stadium; Annapolis, MD	L 10–31	22,069	
September 25	Western Illinois	O'Brien Stadium; Charleston, IL	L 14–28	6,561	
October 2	Indiana State	Memorial Stadium; Terre Haute, IN	L 24–27	6,838	
October 16	at No. 9 Northern Iowa	UNI Dome; Cedar Falls, IA	L 7–19	10,168	
October 23	Illinois State	O'Brien Stadium; Charleston, IL (rivalry)	T 17–17	8,215	
October 30	Southwest Missouri State	O'Brien Stadium; Charleston, IL	W 35–13	3,141	
November 6	Northwestern State*	O'Brien Stadium; Charleston, IL	L 26–34		
November 13	at No. 25 Western Kentucky*	L. T. Smith Stadium; Bowling Green, KY	L 14–28	3,527	
November 20	at Southern Illinois	McAndrew Stadium; Carbondale, IL	W 42–35	1,500	
*Non-conference game; Rankings from The Sports Network Poll released prior to the game
