= 1993 Freedom Bowl =

- Freedom Bowl X
Utah Utes	USC Trojans
(7–4)	(7–5)
21	28
Head coach: Ron McBride	Head coach: John Robinson
	1	2	3	4	Total
Utah	0	0	13	8	21
USC	20	8	0	0	28
- Date: December 30, 1993
- Season: 1993
- Stadium: Anaheim Stadium
- Location: Anaheim, California
- Referee: Terry Turlington (Big Eight)
- Attendance: 43,150

United States TV coverage
- Network: Raycom
- Announcers: Dave Barnett & Dave Rowe

The 1993 Freedom Bowl was a college football bowl game between the Western Athletic Conference's Utah Utes and the Pacific 10 Conference's USC Trojans. After the Trojans jumped to a 28–0 halftime lead, the Utes shut them out in the second half, but were only able to counter with 21 points. USC won 28–21.
