= Chris Johnson (safety, born 1971) =

American football player (born 1971)

Profile
- Position: Safety

Personal information
- Born: August 7, 1971 (age 55); Dallas, Texas, U.S.
- Listed height: 6 ft 0 in (1.83 m)
- Listed weight: 205 lb (93 kg)

Career information
- College: San Diego State
- NFL draft: 1994: undrafted

Career history
- 1994: San Diego Chargers
- 1995: Baltimore Stallions
- 1996: Minnesota Vikings
- Stats at Pro Football Reference

Christopher T'Maul Johnson (born August 7, 1971) is an American former professional football safety. He played in the National Football League (NFL) for the Minnesota Vikings. He played college football for the San Diego State Aztecs.
