= 1993 Utah Utes football team =

American college football season

1993 Utah Utes football

Freedom Bowl, L 21–28 vs. USC
- Conference: Western Athletic Conference
- Record: 7–6 (5–3 WAC)
- Head coach: Ron McBride (4th season)
- Offensive coordinator: Rick Rasnick (3rd season)
- Offensive scheme: Multiple
- Defensive coordinator: Fred Whittingham (2nd season)
- Base defense: 4–3
- Home stadium: Robert Rice Stadium

1993 Western Athletic Conference football standings
	Conf.					Overall
Team	W		L		T	W		L		T
Fresno State +	6	–	2	–	0	8	–	4	–	0
Wyoming +	6	–	2	–	0	8	–	4	–	0
BYU +	6	–	2	–	0	6	–	6	–	0
Utah	5	–	3	–	0	7	–	6	–	0
Colorado State	5	–	3	–	0	5	–	6	–	0
New Mexico	4	–	4	–	0	6	–	5	–	0
San Diego State	4	–	4	–	0	6	–	6	–	0
Hawaii	3	–	5	–	0	6	–	6	–	0
Air Force	1	–	7	–	0	4	–	8	–	0
UTEP	0	–	8	–	0	1	–	11	–	0
+ – Conference co-champions

The 1993 Utah Utes football team represented the University of Utah as a member of the Western Athletic Conference (WAC) during the 1993 NCAA Division I-A football season. In their fourth season under head coach Ron McBride, the Utes compiled an overall record of 7–5 record with a mark of 5–3 against conference opponents, tied for fourth place in the WAC, and were outscored by their opponents 396 to 390. Utah was invited to the Freedom Bowl, where they lost to the USC. The team played home games at Robert Rice Stadium in Salt Lake City.

In the Holy War rivalry, defeated the BYU, 34–31, in Provo, Utah. It was the first win for the Utes the series since 1988 and the first at BYU since 1971.

== Schedule ==
Date	Time	Opponent	Site	TV	Result	Attendance	Source
September 4	8:00 pm	at Arizona State*	Sun Devil Stadium; Tempe, AZ	KUTV	L 0–38	48,809	
September 11	7:00 pm	Utah State*	Robert Rice Stadium; Salt Lake City, UT (Battle of the Brothers)		W 31–29	30,797	
September 18	12:00 pm	at Kansas*	Memorial Stadium; Lawrence, KS	KUTV	W 41–16	34,000	
September 25	7:30 pm	at Wyoming	War Memorial Stadium; Laramie, WY		L 12–28	17,307	
October 2	7:00 pm	No. 2 Idaho*	Robert Rice Stadium; Salt Lake City, UT		L 17–28	25,326	
October 9	7:00 pm	New Mexico	Robert Rice Stadium; Salt Lake City, UT		L 35–42	23,062	
October 16	7:00 pm	at UTEP	Sun Bowl; El Paso, TX	KUTV	W 45–29	33,639	
October 23	12:00 pm	Colorado State	Robert Rice Stadium; Salt Lake City, UT		W 38–21	21,097	
October 30	12:00 pm	San Diego State^{†}	Robert Rice Stadium; Salt Lake City, UT		W 45–41	23,025	
November 6	10:00 pm	at Hawaii	Aloha Stadium; Halawa, HI	KUTV	L 30–41	39,279	
November 13	11:30 am	Air Force	Robert Rice Stadium; Salt Lake City, UT	KUTV	W 41–24	20,811	
November 20	12:00 pm	at BYU	Cougar Stadium; Provo, UT (Holy War)	KSL	W 34–31	65,894	
December 30	7:00 pm	vs. USC*	Anaheim Stadium; Anaheim, CA (Freedom Bowl)	ESPN	L 21–28	43,150	
*Non-conference game; ^{†}Homecoming; Rankings from The Sports Network Poll released prior to the game; All times are in Mountain time

== Game summaries ==
=== At BYU ===
Utah Utes (6–5) at BYU Cougars (5–4)

Quarter	1	2	3	4	Total
Utah	14	3	0	17	34
BYU	3	7	7	14	31

at Cougar Stadium, Provo, Utah

- Date: November 20, 1993
- Game time: 12:00 p.m.
- Game weather: 44 °F (7 °C)
- Game attendance: 65,894
- TV: KSL
- Box Score

Utah's first win in Provo since 1971

Team	Category	Player	Statistics
Utah	Passing	Mike McCoy	29/47, 434 yards, 3 TD, 2 INT
Utah	Rushing	Jamal Anderson	32 rushes, 146 yards, TD
Utah	Receiving	Greg Hooks	7 receptions, 134 yards
BYU	Passing	John Walsh	35/57, 423 yards, TD, 5 INT
BYU	Rushing	Kalin Hall	14 rushes, 80 yards
BYU	Receiving	Tim Nowatzke	6 receptions, 82 yards

External videos
- Game highlights

Scoring summary

Quarter	Time	Drive			Team	Scoring information	Score	
Quarter	Time	Plays	Yards	TOP	Team	Scoring information	UTAH	BYU
1					Utah	Bryan Rowley 4-yard touchdown reception from Mike McCoy, Chris Yergensen kick good	7	0
1					BYU	36-yard field goal by Joe Herrick	7	3
1			80		Utah	Jamal Anderson 9-yard touchdown reception from Mike McCoy, Chris Yergensen kick good	14	3
2					BYU	Bryce Doman 3-yard touchdown reception from John Walsh, Joe Herrick kick good	14	10
2					Utah	41-yard field goal by Chris Yergensen	17	10
3					BYU	John Walsh 1-yard touchdown run, Joe Herrick kick good	17	17
4					Utah	Curtis Marsh 84-yard touchdown reception from Mike McCoy, Chris Yergensen kick no good	23	17
4					BYU	Kalin Hall 4-yard touchdown run, Joe Herrick kick good	23	24
4	4:39				Utah	Jamal Anderson 4-yard touchdown run, 2-point pass good	31	24
4	3:16				BYU	John Walsh 1-yard touchdown run, Joe Herrick kick good	31	31
4	0:25				Utah	55-yard field goal by Chris Yergensen	34	31
"TOP" = time of possession. For other American football terms, see Glossary of American football.							34	31

== Personnel ==
1993 Utah Utes football team roster
Players
Coaches
Offense

Pos.	#	Name	Class
RB	32	Jamal Anderson	Sr
OT	74	Anthony Brown	Jr
TE	82	Kurt Haws	Sr
WR	21	Curtis Marsh	Jr
QB	14	Mike McCoy	Jr
C	56	Lance Scott	Jr

Defense

Pos.	#	Name	Class
DT	83	Luther Elliss	Jr
DE	36	Bronzell Miller	Jr

Special teams

Pos.	#	Name	Class
K	11	Chris Yergensen	Sr

Head coach

- Ron McBride

Coordinators/assistant coaches

Legend

- (C) Team captain
- (S) Suspended
- (I) Ineligible
- Injured
- Redshirt

== NFL draft ==
Two Utah players were selected in the 1994 NFL draft, including future pro bowler Jamal Anderson.

Player	Position	Round	Pick	NFL team
Kurt Haws	Tight end	4	105	Washington Redskins
Jamal Anderson	Running back	7	201	Atlanta Falcons
