= 1993–94 NCAA football bowl games =

College football postseason game series

- Season: 1993
- Number of bowls: 19
- Bowl games: December 17, 1993 – January 1, 1994
- National Championship: Orange Bowl
- Location of Championship: Miami Orange Bowl; Miami, Florida
- Champions: Florida State
Bowl record by conference
| Conference | Bowls | Record | Final AP poll |
| Big Ten | 7 | 4–3 (0.571) | 4 |
| ACC | 5 | 2–3 (0.400) | 3 |
| Big Eight | 4 | 3–1 (0.750) | 4 |
| Pac-10 | 4 | 3–1 (0.750) | 3 |
| SEC | 4 | 2–2 (0.500) | 4 |
| Big East | 4 | 2–2 (0.500) | 4 |
| WAC | 4 | 0–4 (0.000) | 0 |
| SWC | 2 | 0–2 (0.000) | 1 |
| Big West | 1 | 1–0 (1.000) | 0 |
| MAC | 1 | 0–1 (0.000) | 0 |

The 1993–94 NCAA football bowl games concluded the 1993 NCAA Division I-A football season. In the second year of the Bowl Coalition era, the 1994 Orange Bowl was designated as the national championship game, pitting Florida State (11–1), ranked first in the AP Poll and third in the Coaches Poll, against Nebraska (11–0), ranked second in the AP Poll and first in the Coaches Poll. Undefeated and untied West Virginia was ranked second in the Coaches Poll but was relegated to the Sugar Bowl after finishing in third in the Bowl Coalition composite rankings. Florida State defeated Nebraska in the Orange Bowl, which, along with West Virginia's loss to Florida in the Sugar Bowl, allowed Florida State to secure a national championship in both major polls.

A total of 19 bowl games were played between December 17, 1993 and January 1, 1994 by 38 bowl-eligible teams. One new bowl game was added during the 1993–94 season: the Alamo Bowl, held in San Antonio, Texas.

== Non-Coalition bowls ==
| Date | Time | TV | Game | Site | Result | Ref. |
|---|---|---|---|---|---|---|
| Dec 17 | 8:00 PM | ESPN | Las Vegas Bowl | Sam Boyd Stadium; Whitney, NV | Utah State 42, Ball State 33 | |
| Dec 25 | 2:30 PM | ABC | Aloha Bowl | Aloha Stadium; Honolulu, HI | No. 17 Colorado 41, No. 25–T Fresno State 30 | |
| Dec 28 | 8:00 PM | ESPN | Liberty Bowl | Liberty Bowl Memorial Stadium; Memphis, TN | No. 25–T Louisville 18, Michigan State 7 | |
| Dec 29 | 8:00 PM | ESPN | Copper Bowl | Arizona Stadium; Tucson, AZ | No. 20 Kansas State 52, Wyoming 17 | |
| Dec 30 | 8:00 PM | ESPN | Holiday Bowl | Jack Murphy Stadium; San Diego, CA | No. 11 Ohio State 28, BYU 21 | |
| Dec 30 | 9:00 PM | Raycom | Freedom Bowl | Anaheim Stadium; Anaheim, CA | USC 28, Utah 21 | |
| Dec 31 | 12:30 PM | ESPN | Independence Bowl | Independence Stadium; Shreveport, LA | No. 22 Virginia Tech 45, No. 21 Indiana 20 | |
| Dec 31 | 6:00 PM | ESPN | Peach Bowl | Georgia Dome; Atlanta, GA | No. 24 Clemson 14, Kentucky 13 | |
| Dec 31 | 9:30 PM | ESPN | Alamo Bowl | Alamo Dome; San Antonio, TX | California 37, Iowa 3 | |
| Jan 1 | 11:00 AM | ESPN | Hall of Fame Bowl | Tampa Stadium; Tampa, FL | No. 23 Michigan 42, NC State 7 | |
| Jan 1 | 1:00 PM | ABC | Citrus Bowl | Florida Citrus Bowl; Orlando, FL | No. 13 Penn State 31, No. 6 Tennessee 13 | |
| Jan 1 | 1:30 PM | CBS | Carquest Bowl | Joe Robbie Stadium; Miami Gardens, FL | No. 15 Boston College 31, Virginia 13 | |
| Jan 1 | 4:30 PM | ABC | Rose Bowl | Rose Bowl; Pasadena, CA | No. 9 Wisconsin 21, No. 14 UCLA 16 | |
Rankings from AP Poll released prior to the game. All times are in Eastern Time.

== Bowl Coalition bowls ==
Tier I
| Date | Time | TV | Game | Site | Result | Ref. |
|---|---|---|---|---|---|---|
| Jan 1 | 1:00 PM | NBC | Fiesta Bowl | Sun Devil Stadium; Tempe, AZ | No. 16 Arizona 29, No. 10 Miami (FL) 0 | |
| Jan 1 | 4:30 PM | NBC | Cotton Bowl Classic | Cotton Bowl; Dallas, TX | No. 4 Notre Dame 24, No. 7 Texas A&M 21 | |
| Jan 1 | 8:00 PM | NBC | Orange Bowl; Championship game | Miami Orange Bowl; Miami, FL | No. 1 Florida State 18, No. 2 Nebraska 16 | |
| Jan 1 | 8:30 PM | ABC | Sugar Bowl | Louisiana Superdome; New Orleans, LA | No. 8 Florida 41, No. 3 West Virginia 7 | |
Rankings from AP Poll released prior to the game. All times are in Eastern Time.

Tier II
| Date | Time | TV | Game | Site | Result | Ref. |
|---|---|---|---|---|---|---|
| Dec 24 | 2:30 PM | CBS | John Hancock Bowl | Sun Bowl; El Paso, TX | No. 19 Oklahoma 41, Texas Tech 10 | |
| Dec 31 | 7:00 PM | TBS | Gator Bowl | Gator Bowl Stadium; Jacksonville, FL | No. 18 Alabama 24, No. 12 North Carolina 10 | |
Rankings from AP Poll released prior to the game. All times are in Eastern Time.
