= 1993 Rutgers Scarlet Knights football team =

American college football season

1993 Rutgers Scarlet Knights football
- Conference: Big East Conference
- Record: 4–7 (1–6 Big East)
- Head coach: Doug Graber (4th season)
- Offensive coordinator: Stan Parrish (4th season)
- Defensive coordinator: Rich Rachel (4th season)
- Home stadium: Giants Stadium

1993 Big East Conference football standings
	Conf.					Overall
Team	W		L		T	W		L		T
No. 7 West Virginia $	7	–	0	–	0	11	–	1	–	0
No. 15 Miami (FL)	6	–	1	–	0	9	–	3	–	0
No. 13 Boston College	5	–	2	–	0	9	–	3	–	0
No. 22 Virginia Tech	4	–	3	–	0	9	–	3	–	0
Syracuse	3	–	4	–	0	6	–	4	–	1
Pittsburgh	2	–	5	–	0	3	–	8	–	0
Rutgers	1	–	6	–	0	4	–	7	–	0
Temple	0	–	7	–	0	1	–	10	–	0
$ – Conference champion; Rankings from AP Poll

The 1993 Rutgers Scarlet Knights football team represented Rutgers University in the 1993 NCAA Division I-A football season. In their fourth season under head coach Doug Graber, the Scarlet Knights compiled a 4–7 record, outscored their opponents 351 to 334, and finished in seventh place in the Big East Conference. The team's statistical leaders included Ray Lucas with 1,011 passing yards, Terrell Willis with 1,261 rushing yards, and Chris Brantley with 589 receiving yards.

Due to the demolition of Rutgers Stadium, the Scarlet Knights played their home games at Giants Stadium at The Meadowlands for the season.

== Schedule ==
Date	Time	Opponent	Site	TV	Result	Attendance	Source
September 4		Colgate*	Giants Stadium; East Rutherford, NJ		W 68–6	19,194	
September 11		Duke*	Giants Stadium; East Rutherford, NJ	BEN	W 39–38	26,854	
September 25	7:30 pm	at No. 9 Penn State*	Beaver Stadium; University Park, PA	ESPN	L 7–31	95,032	
October 2		Temple	Giants Stadium; East Rutherford, NJ	NJN	W 62–0	22,314	
October 9		Boston College	Giants Stadium; East Rutherford, NJ		L 21–31	37,035	
October 16		at Army*	Michie Stadium; West Point, NY		W 45–38	40,759	
October 23	1:00 pm	at Virginia Tech	Lane Stadium; Blacksburg, VA		L 42–49	40,211	
October 28	7:30 pm	Pittsburgh	Giants Stadium; East Rutherford, NJ	ESPN	L 10–21	20,130	
November 6	1:00 pm	at No. 11 West Virginia	Mountaineer Field; Morgantown, WV		L 22–58	51,339	
November 13	4:00 pm	at No. 3 Miami (FL)	Miami Orange Bowl; Miami, FL		L 17–31	52,561	
November 26	11:00 am	Syracuse	Giants Stadium; East Rutherford, NJ	ABC	L 18–31	26,101	
*Non-conference game; Rankings from AP Poll released prior to the game

== Roster ==
1993 Rutgers Scarlet Knights football team roster
Players
Coaches
Offense

Pos.	#	Name	Class
TE	81	Marco Battaglia	So
WR	12	Chris Brantley	Sr
WR	8	Mario Henry	Jr
QB	1	Ray Lucas	So
G	78	Mike Spitzer	Sr
TE	88	Chris Stoll	Sr

Defense

Pos.	#	Name	Class
FS	9	Jay Bellamy	Sr

Special teams

Pos.	#	Name	Class

Head coach

- Doug Graber

Coordinators/assistant coaches

Legend

- (C) Team captain
- (S) Suspended
- (I) Ineligible
- Injured
- Redshirt
