= 1993 Temple Owls football team =

American college football season

1993 Temple Owls football
- Conference: Big East Conference
- Record: 1–10 (0–7 Big East)
- Head coach: Ron Dickerson (1st season)
- Offensive coordinator: Nick Gasparsto (1st season)
- Defensive coordinator: Fred Manuel (1st season)
- Home stadium: Veterans Stadium

1993 Big East Conference football standings
	Conf.					Overall
Team	W		L		T	W		L		T
No. 7 West Virginia $	7	–	0	–	0	11	–	1	–	0
No. 15 Miami (FL)	6	–	1	–	0	9	–	3	–	0
No. 13 Boston College	5	–	2	–	0	9	–	3	–	0
No. 22 Virginia Tech	4	–	3	–	0	9	–	3	–	0
Syracuse	3	–	4	–	0	6	–	4	–	1
Pittsburgh	2	–	5	–	0	3	–	8	–	0
Rutgers	1	–	6	–	0	4	–	7	–	0
Temple	0	–	7	–	0	1	–	10	–	0
$ – Conference champion; Rankings from AP Poll

The 1993 Temple Owls football team represented Temple University as a member of the Big East Conference during the 1993 NCAA Division I-A football season. Led by first-year head coach Ron Dickerson, the Owls compiled an overall record of 1–10 with a mark of 0–7 in conference play, placing last out of eight teams in the Big East. Temple played home games at Veterans Stadium in Philadelphia.

== Schedule ==
Date	Opponent	Site	Result	Attendance	Source
September 9	at Eastern Michigan*	Rynearson Stadium; Ypsilanti, MI	W 31–28		
September 18	No. 21 California*	Veterans Stadium; Philadelphia, PA	L 0–58		
September 25	at Boston College	Alumni Stadium; Chestnut Hill, MA	L 14–66	33,298	
October 2	at Rutgers	Giants Stadium; East Rutherford, NJ	L 0–62	22,314	
October 9	Army*	Veterans Stadium; Philadelphia, PA	L 21–52		
October 16	at Virginia Tech	Lane Stadium; Blacksburg, VA	L 7–55	40,634	
October 23	Akron	Veterans Stadium; Philadelphia, PA	L 7–31		
October 30	at No. 4 Miami (FL)	Miami Orange Bowl; Miami, FL	L 7–42	33,927	
November 6	at Syracuse	Carrier Dome; Syracuse, NY	L 3–52	48,949	
November 13	No. 9 West Virginia	Veterans Stadium; Philadelphia, PA	L 7–49	7,128	
November 20	Pittsburgh	Veterans Stadium; Philadelphia, PA	L 18–28	5,435	
*Non-conference game; Rankings from AP Poll released prior to the game
