= 1993 Pittsburgh Panthers football team =

American college football season

1993 Pittsburgh Panthers football
- Conference: Big East Conference
- Record: 3–8 (2–5 Big East)
- Head coach: Johnny Majors (5th season)
- Offensive coordinator: Ken Karcher (1st season)
- Offensive scheme: Multiple pro-style
- Defensive coordinator: Chuck Driesbach (1st season)
- Base defense: Multiple 4–3
- Home stadium: Pitt Stadium

1993 Big East Conference football standings
	Conf.					Overall
Team	W		L		T	W		L		T
No. 7 West Virginia $	7	–	0	–	0	11	–	1	–	0
No. 15 Miami (FL)	6	–	1	–	0	9	–	3	–	0
No. 13 Boston College	5	–	2	–	0	9	–	3	–	0
No. 22 Virginia Tech	4	–	3	–	0	9	–	3	–	0
Syracuse	3	–	4	–	0	6	–	4	–	1
Pittsburgh	2	–	5	–	0	3	–	8	–	0
Rutgers	1	–	6	–	0	4	–	7	–	0
Temple	0	–	7	–	0	1	–	10	–	0
$ – Conference champion; Rankings from AP Poll

The 1993 Pittsburgh Panthers football team represented the University of Pittsburgh in the 1993 NCAA Division I-A football season.

== Schedule ==
Date	Time	Opponent	Site	TV	Result	Attendance	Source
September 2	7:30 p.m.	at Southern Miss*	M. M. Roberts Stadium; Hattiesburg, MS	ESPN	W 14–10	25,516	
September 11	12:00 p.m.	Virginia Tech	Pitt Stadium; Pittsburgh, PA	Big East	L 21–63	33,839	
September 18	12:00 p.m.	No. 11 Ohio State*	Pitt Stadium; Pittsburgh, PA	Big East	L 28–63	41,511	
October 2	7:00 p.m.	No. 18 Louisville*	Pitt Stadium; Pittsburgh, PA		L 7–29	28,528	
October 9	1:30 p.m.	at No. 4 Notre Dame*	Notre Dame Stadium; Notre Dame, IN (rivalry)	NBC	L 0–44	59,075	
October 16	12:00 p.m.	No. 24 Syracuse	Pitt Stadium; Pittsburgh, PA (rivalry)	Big East	L 21–24	34,268	
October 23	12:00 p.m.	at No. 18 West Virginia	Mountaineer Field; Morgantown, WV (Backyard Brawl)	Big East	L 21–42	65,041	
October 28	7:30 p.m.	at Rutgers	Giants Stadium; East Rutherford, NJ	ESPN	W 21–10	20,130	
November 6	12:00 p.m.	No. 4 Miami (FL)	Pitt Stadium; Pittsburgh, PA	Big East	L 7–35	32,064	
November 13	1:30 p.m.	No. 22 Boston College	Pitt Stadium; Pittsburgh, PA		L 0–33	10,892	
November 20	12:00 p.m.	at Temple	Veterans Stadium; Philadelphia, PA	Big East	W 28–18	5,435	
*Non-conference game; Rankings from AP Poll released prior to the game; All times are in Eastern time

== Roster ==
1993 Pittsburgh Panthers football team roster
Players
Coaches
Offense

Pos.	#	Name	Class
G	78	Ruben Brown	Jr
WR	49	Billy Davis	Jr
WR	26	Dietrich Jells	So
RB	29	Curtis Martin	Jr
QB	14	John Ryan	So

Defense

Pos.	#	Name	Class
DT	90	Tom Barndt	Jr
DB	12	Anthony Dorsett	So
DL	98	Mike Mohring	Fr
LB	84	Tom Tumulty	So

Special teams

Pos.	#	Name	Class

Head coach

- Johnny Majors

Coordinators/assistant coaches

Legend

- (C) Team captain
- (S) Suspended
- (I) Ineligible
- Injured
- Redshirt

== Coaching staff ==
1993 Pittsburgh Panthers football staff
Coaching staff: Johnny Majors – Head coach; Steve Bird – Wide receivers/kickers; Matt Cavanaugh – Tight ends; Charles Coe – Run Offense coordinator/running backs; Chuck Driesbach – Defensive coordinator; Jack Henry – Offensive line; Ken Karcher – Pass Offense coordinator/quarterbacks; Tim Lewis – Defensive secondary; John "Rusty" Russell – Linebackers; Tom Turchetta – Defensive line	Support staff: Alex Kramer – Administrative assistant; Curt Cignetti – Recruiting coordinator; Mike Pettine – Graduate assistant; Jim Shiffer – Graduate assistant	Strength and conditioning staff: Tim Wilson – Strength and conditioning Coach; Jim Schmus – Assistant Strength and Conditioning Coach

== Team players drafted into the NFL ==
Player	Position	Round	Pick	NFL club
No Players Selected
