= 1993 Indiana Hoosiers football team =

American college football season

1993 Indiana Hoosiers football

Independence Bowl, L 20–45 vs. Virginia Tech
- Conference: Big Ten Conference
- Record: 8–4 (5–3 Big Ten)
- Head coach: Bill Mallory (10th season)
- Defensive coordinator: Joe Novak (10th season)
- MVP: Thomas Lewis
- Captains: Charles Beauchamp; Hurvin McCormack
- Home stadium: Memorial Stadium

1993 Big Ten Conference football standings
	Conf.					Overall
Team	W		L		T	W		L		T
No. 6 Wisconsin +	6	–	1	–	1	10	–	1	–	1
No. 11 Ohio State +	6	–	1	–	1	10	–	1	–	1
No. 8 Penn State	6	–	2	–	0	10	–	2	–	0
Indiana	5	–	3	–	0	8	–	4	–	0
No. 21 Michigan	5	–	3	–	0	8	–	4	–	0
Illinois	5	–	3	–	0	5	–	6	–	0
Michigan State	4	–	4	–	0	6	–	6	–	0
Iowa	3	–	5	–	0	6	–	6	–	0
Minnesota	3	–	5	–	0	4	–	7	–	0
Northwestern	0	–	8	–	0	2	–	9	–	0
Purdue	0	–	8	–	0	1	–	10	–	0
+ – Conference co-champions; Rankings from AP Poll

The 1993 Indiana Hoosiers football team represented Indiana University Bloomington as a member of the Big Ten Conference during the 1993 NCAA Division I-A football season. Led by tenth-year head coach Bill Mallory, the Hoosiers compiled an overall record of 8–4 with a mark of 5–3 in conference play, placing in a three-way tie for fourth in the Big Ten. Indiana was invited to the Independence Bowl, where the Hoosiers lost to Virginia Tech, 45–20. The team played home games at Memorial Stadium in Bloomington, Indiana.

== Schedule ==
Date	Time	Opponent	Rank	Site	TV	Result	Attendance	Source
September 4	7:00 pm	Toledo*		Memorial Stadium; Bloomington, IN		W 27–0	30,327	
September 11	1:00 pm	Northern Illinois*		Memorial Stadium; Bloomington, IN		W 28–10	30,920	
September 18	1:00 pm	Kentucky*		Memorial Stadium; Bloomington, IN (rivalry)		W 24–8	43,545	
September 25	12:30 pm	No. 23 Wisconsin		Memorial Stadium; Bloomington, IN	ESPN	L 15–27	34,306	
October 2	8:00 pm	at Minnesota		Hubert H. Humphrey Metrodome; Minneapolis, MN		W 23–19	33,315	
October 9	1:00 pm	Iowa^{†}		Memorial Stadium; Bloomington, IN		W 16–10	40,066	
October 23	2:00 pm	at Northwestern		Dyche Stadium; Evanston, IL		W 24–0	39,251	
October 30	2:00 pm	No. 22 Michigan State	No. 23	Memorial Stadium; Bloomington, IN (rivalry)		W 10–0	40,110	
November 6	1:00 pm	at No. 19 Penn State	No. 17	Beaver Stadium; University Park, PA		L 31–38	91,000	
November 13	3:30 pm	at No. 5 Ohio State	No. 19	Ohio Stadium; Columbus, OH	ABC	L 17–23	93,741	
November 20	1:00 pm	Purdue	No. 21	Memorial Stadium; Bloomington, IN (Old Oaken Bucket)		W 24–17	48,429	
December 31	12:30 pm	vs. No. 22 Virginia Tech	No. 21	Independence Stadium; Shreveport, LA (Independence Bowl)	ESPN	L 20–45	33,819	
*Non-conference game; ^{†}Homecoming; Rankings from AP Poll released prior to the game; All times are in Eastern time

== Roster ==
1993 Indiana Hoosiers football team roster
Players
Coaches
Offense

Pos.	#	Name	Class
C	55	Rob Carey	Sr
RB	2	Jermaine Chaney	Jr
G	72	Andrew Greene	Jr
RB	22	Brent Law	Jr
WR	8	Thomas Lewis	Jr
OT	61	Tom McKinnon	Jr
QB	11	John Paci	Jr
TE	89	Dan Thompson	Sr
G	56	Todd Smith	Sr
OT	78	Clay Williams	So

Defense

Pos.	#	Name	Class
DE	95	Charles Beauchamp	Sr
SS	25	Lance Brown	Jr
DE	98	Nathan Davis	Fr
DT	66	Troy Drake	Jr
FS	16	Chris Dyer	Sr
DT	93	Hurvin McCormack	Jr
DE	92	Lamar Mills	Sr
LB	53	Tim O’Connell	Jr
CB	10	Mose Richardson	Sr
CB	18	Eric Smedley	So
FS	5	Damon Watts	Sr
DE	86	Bernard Whittington	Sr
LB	96	Trevor Wilmot	Jr

Special teams

Pos.	#	Name	Class
P	24	Jim DiGuilie	Jr

Head coach

- Bill Mallory

Coordinators/assistant coaches

- Curt Mallory – Graduate assistant

Legend

- (C) Team captain
- (S) Suspended
- (I) Ineligible
- Injured
- Redshirt

== 1994 NFL draftees ==
Player	Round	Pick	Position	NFL club
Thomas Lewis	1	24	Wide receiver	New York Giants
