= 1994 Sugar Bowl =

1994 USF&G Insurance Sugar Bowl
- 60th Sugar Bowl
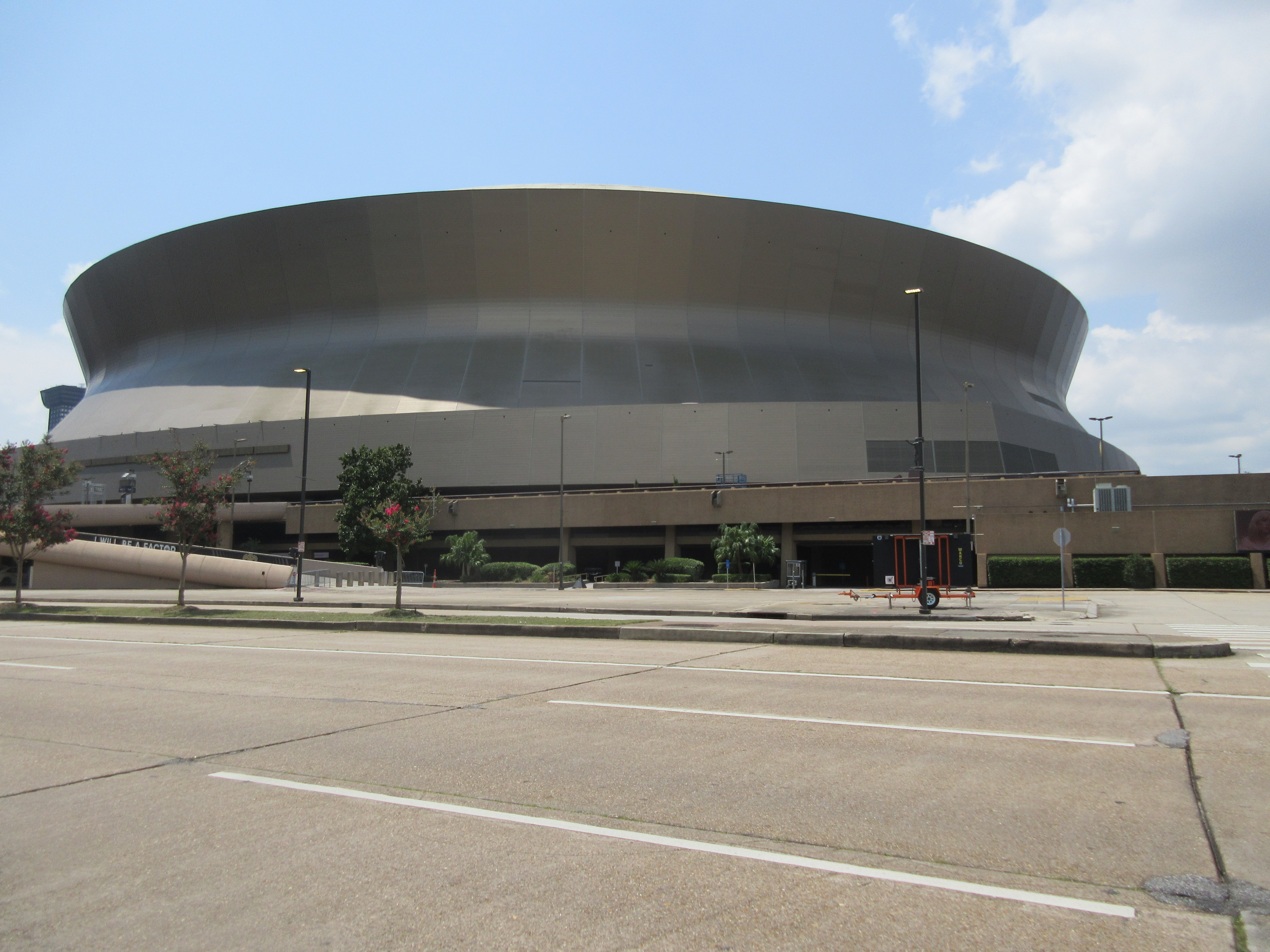
- The Louisiana Superdome in New Orleans, Louisiana, hosted the Sugar Bowl.
Florida Gators	West Virginia Mountaineers
(10–2)	(11–0)
SEC	Big East
41	7
Head coach: Steve Spurrier	Head coach: Don Nehlen
AP / Coaches / BC; 8 / 8 / 8	AP / Coaches / BC; 3 / 2 / 3
	1	2	3	4	Total
Florida	7	14	14	6	41
West Virginia	7	0	0	0	7
- Date: January 1, 1994
- Season: 1993
- Stadium: Louisiana Superdome
- Location: New Orleans, Louisiana
- MVP: Florida RB Errict Rhett
- Favorite: Florida by 6.5 points (54.5)
- Referee: Jim Kemerling (Big Ten)
- Attendance: 75,437

United States TV coverage
- Network: ABC
- Announcers: Brent Musburger and Dick Vermeil

The 1994 Sugar Bowl took place on January 1, 1994, in the Louisiana Superdome in New Orleans, Louisiana between the Florida Gators, the champions of the Southeastern Conference (SEC), and West Virginia Mountaineers, winners of the Big East Conference. The Mountaineers came into the game undefeated, with a shot at a share of the national title, while Florida came in 10–2 and ranked #8.

== Game summary ==
After a quick touchdown from Jake Kelchner to Jay Kearney to put West Virginia up 7–0 early, the Gators came right back and answered with a touchdown by Errict Rhett to tie the score at 7. Just before halftime, Gator defensive back Lawrence Wright picked off an errant pass from West Virginia quarterback Darren Studstill right on the midfield logo. He first made his way to his right side, but when he ran out of blocking help just inside the West Virginia 40, he turned around and backtracked, circling back to the 45 before finding some running room, and he sprinted into the end zone from there to cap a 51-yard interception return touchdown. That put Florida up 14–7, and crushed the Mountaineers' competitive spirit, as Florida's defense proceeded to force a quick three and out, which gave Terry Dean time to connect with Willie Jackson for a 39-yard touchdown to make it 21–7 at halftime.

From there, the Gators cruised in the second half. Rhett ran in two more touchdowns and Judd Davis added two insurance field goals in the fourth quarter to make the final score a convincing 41–7.

== Scoring summary ==
Qtr	Team	Scoring Information	Score	
Qtr	Team	Scoring Information	FLA	WV
1	WV	Jake Kelchner 32-yard touchdown pass to Jay Kearney, Tom Mazzone kick good	0	7
1	FLA	Errict Rhett 3-yard touchdown run, Judd Davis kick good	7	7
2	FLA	Lawrence Wright 51-yard return of an interception for a touchdown, Judd Davis kick good	14	7
2	FLA	Terry Dean 39-yard touchdown pass to Willie Jackson, Judd Davis kick good	21	7
3	FLA	Errict Rhett 2-yard touchdown run, Judd Davis kick good	28	7
3	FLA	Errict Rhett 1-yard touchdown run, Judd Davis kick good	35	7
4	FLA	43-yard field goal by Judd Davis	38	7
4	FLA	26-yard field goal by Judd Davis	41	7
Final score			41	7
