= 1993 Boston College Eagles football team =

American college football season

1993 Boston College Eagles football

Carquest Bowl champion

Carquest Bowl, W 31–13 vs. Virginia
- Conference: Big East Conference

Ranking
- Coaches: No. 12
- AP: No. 13
- Record: 9–3 (5–2 Big East)
- Head coach: Tom Coughlin (3rd season)
- Offensive coordinator: Tom Coughlin (3rd season)
- Defensive coordinator: Steve Szabo (3rd season)
- Captain: Game captains
- Home stadium: Alumni Stadium

1993 Big East Conference football standings
| | Conf. | | | | | Overall |
| Team | W | | L | | T | W | | L | | T |
|---|---|---|---|---|---|---|---|---|---|---|
| No. 7 West Virginia $ | 7 | – | 0 | – | 0 | 11 | – | 1 | – | 0 |
| No. 15 Miami (FL) | 6 | – | 1 | – | 0 | 9 | – | 3 | – | 0 |
| No. 13 Boston College | 5 | – | 2 | – | 0 | 9 | – | 3 | – | 0 |
| No. 22 Virginia Tech | 4 | – | 3 | – | 0 | 9 | – | 3 | – | 0 |
| Syracuse | 3 | – | 4 | – | 0 | 6 | – | 4 | – | 1 |
| Pittsburgh | 2 | – | 5 | – | 0 | 3 | – | 8 | – | 0 |
| Rutgers | 1 | – | 6 | – | 0 | 4 | – | 7 | – | 0 |
| Temple | 0 | – | 7 | – | 0 | 1 | – | 10 | – | 0 |
$ – Conference champion; Rankings from AP Poll

The 1993 Boston College Eagles football team represented Boston College in the 1993 NCAA Division I-A football season. The Eagles were led by head coach Tom Coughlin, in his third and final year with the team, and played their home games at Alumni Stadium in Chestnut Hill, Massachusetts. They competed as members of the Big East Conference.

After opening the year with two consecutive losses, Boston College went on an eight-game win streak, the last of which was a monumental upset over rival Notre Dame. Notre Dame had been the favorites to win the national title after beating Florida State the week prior, but their title hopes were dashed by Boston College when Eagles kicker David Gordon hit a 41-yard field goal as time expired to win 41–39. After losing to eventual Big East champions West Virginia in the final game of the regular season, they were invited to the 1994 Carquest Bowl, where they defeated Virginia, 31–13. The Eagles were ranked 13th in the season's final AP Poll.

Quarterback Glenn Foley was named Big East Offensive Player of the Year, throwing for 3,397 yards and 25 touchdowns. He was joined on the First Team All-Big East by tight end Pete Mitchell and linebacker Stephen Boyd.

After the season, Coughlin left Boston College to become the head coach of the soon-to-be-launched Jacksonville Jaguars of the NFL.

== Schedule ==
| Date | Opponent | Rank | Site | Result | Attendance | Source |
|---|---|---|---|---|---|---|
| September 4 | No. 3 Miami (FL) | No. 20 | Alumni Stadium; Chestnut Hill, MA | L 7–23 | 33,298 | |
| September 18 | at Northwestern* | No. 22 | Dyche Stadium; Evanston, IL | L 21–22 | 31,086 | |
| September 25 | Temple | | Alumni Stadium; Chestnut Hill, MA | W 66–14 | 33,298 | |
| October 2 | at No. 13 Syracuse | | Carrier Dome; Syracuse, NY | W 33–29 | 48,839 | |
| October 9 | at Rutgers | | Giants Stadium; East Rutherford, NJ | W 31–21 | 37,035 | |
| October 23 | Army* | | Alumni Stadium; Chestnut Hill, MA | W 41–14 | 33,298 | |
| October 30 | Tulane* | | Alumni Stadium; Chestnut Hill, MA | W 42–14 | 33,298 | |
| November 6 | No. 25 Virginia Tech | | Alumni Stadium; Chestnut Hill, MA (rivalry) | W 48–34 | 32,698 | |
| November 13 | at Pittsburgh | No. 22 | Pitt Stadium; Pittsburgh, PA | W 33–0 | 10,892 | |
| November 20 | at No. 1 Notre Dame* | No. 17 | Notre Dame Stadium; Notre Dame, IN (Holy War) | W 41–39 | 59,075 | |
| November 26 | No. 5 West Virginia | No. 11 | Alumni Stadium; Chestnut Hill, MA | L 14–17 | 33,298 | |
| January 1, 1994 | vs. Virginia* | No. 15 | Joe Robbie Stadium; Miami Gardens, FL (Carquest Bowl) | W 31–13 | 38,516 | |
*Non-conference game; Rankings from AP Poll released prior to the game

== Game summaries ==
=== Notre Dame ===
| Team | 1 | 2 | 3 | 4 | Total |
|---|---|---|---|---|---|
| • Boston College | 10 | 14 | 7 | 10 | 41 |
| Notre Dame | 0 | 14 | 3 | 22 | 39 |

- Date: November 20
- Location: Notre Dame Stadium, South Bend, IN
- Game attendance: 59,075
- TV announcers (NBC): Tom Hammond, Cris Collinsworth

Scoring summary
| 1 | 8:02 | BC | David Gordon 28 yard field goal | BC 3-0 |
| 1 | | BC | Ivan Boyd 5 yard pass from Glenn Foley (Gordon kick) | BC 10-0 |
| 2 | 11:58 | ND | Ray Zellars 39 yard pass from Kevin McDougal (Pendergast kick) | BC 10-7 |
| 2 | | BC | Ivan Boyd 35 yard pass from Glenn Foley (Gordon kick) | BC 17-7 |
| 2 | 5:52 | ND | #9 1 yard run (Pendergast kick) | BC 17-14 |
| 2 | 0:21 | BC | Pete Mitchell 3 yard pass from Glenn Foley (Gordon kick) | BC 24-14 |
| 3 | 11:24 | BC | Darnell Campbell 22 yard run (Gordon kick) | BC 31-14 |
| 3 | 3:20 | ND | Pendergast 29 yard field goal | BC 31-17 |
| 4 | 11:13 | BC | Pete Mitchell 2 yard pass from Glenn Foley (Gordon kick) | BC 38-17 |
| 4 | 10:12 | ND | Lee Becton 29 yard run (Becton pass to McDougal) | BC 38-25 |
| 4 | 4:02 | ND | Ray Zellars 4 yard run (Pendergast kick) | BC 38-32 |
| 4 | 1:09 | ND | Dawson 4 yard pass from McDougal (Pendergast kick) | ND 39-38 |
| 4 | 0:00 | BC | David Gordon 41 yard field goal | BC 41-39 |

== Roster ==
1993 Boston College Eagles football team roster
Players
Coaches
Offense

| Pos. | # | Name | Class |
|---|---|---|---|
| QB | 13 | Glenn Foley | Sr |
| RB | 30 | David Green | Jr |
| QB | 10 | Mark Hartsell | Fr |
| QB | 7 | Matt Hasselbeck | Fr |
| TE | 88 | Gordon Laro | Jr |
| TE | 82 | Pete Mitchell | Jr |
| C | 64 | Tom Nalen | Sr |

Defense

| Pos. | # | Name | Class |
|---|---|---|---|
| LB | 50 | Stephen Boyd | Jr |
| LB | 91 | Dan Kerr | Sr |
| DE | 59 | Mike Mamula | So |
| DB | 17 | Michael Reed | Jr |

Special teams

| Pos. | # | Name | Class |
|---|---|---|---|
| K | 14 | David Gordon | Sr |

Head coach

- Tom Coughlin

Coordinators/assistant coaches

- Gary Crowton (Quarterbacks)

Legend

- (C) Team captain
- (S) Suspended
- (I) Ineligible
- Injured
- Redshirt
