= 1993 Virginia Tech Hokies football team =

American college football season

1993 Virginia Tech Hokies football

Independence Bowl champion

Independence Bowl, W 45–20 vs. Indiana
- Conference: Big East Conference

Ranking
- Coaches: No. 20
- AP: No. 22
- Record: 9–3 (4–3 Big East)
- Head coach: Frank Beamer (7th season)
- Offensive coordinator: Rickey Bustle (1st season)
- Offensive scheme: Multiple
- Defensive coordinator: Phil Elmassian (1st season)
- Base defense: 4–4
- Home stadium: Lane Stadium

1993 Big East Conference football standings
	Conf.					Overall
Team	W		L		T	W		L		T
No. 7 West Virginia $	7	–	0	–	0	11	–	1	–	0
No. 15 Miami (FL)	6	–	1	–	0	9	–	3	–	0
No. 13 Boston College	5	–	2	–	0	9	–	3	–	0
No. 22 Virginia Tech	4	–	3	–	0	9	–	3	–	0
Syracuse	3	–	4	–	0	6	–	4	–	1
Pittsburgh	2	–	5	–	0	3	–	8	–	0
Rutgers	1	–	6	–	0	4	–	7	–	0
Temple	0	–	7	–	0	1	–	10	–	0
$ – Conference champion; Rankings from AP Poll

The 1993 Virginia Tech Hokies football team represented Virginia Tech (formally the Virginia Polytechnic Institute and State University) as a member of the Big East Conference during the 1993 NCAA Division I-A football season. Led by seventh-year head coach Frank Beamer, the Hokies compiled an overall record of 9–3, with a mark of 4–3 in conference play, and finished fourth in the Big East. Virginia Tech played home games at Lane Stadium in Blacksburg, Virginia.

The 1993 season served as the definitive turning point in the history of Virginia Tech football, marking the transition from "hard luck" to national prominence. After finishing the 1992 campaign with a disappointing 2–8–1 record, Frank Beamer’s program orchestrated a dramatic redemption, finishing the year with a 9–3 record and a victory in one of 17 bowl games that season. This season initiated an unprecedented streak of consecutive bowl appearances that would define the program for nearly three decades. Central to this resurgence was an explosive offense led by quarterback Maurice DeShazo and a defense that began to exhibit the aggressive, ball-hawking traits that would later be dubbed "Lunch Pail Defense."

The Hokies won six of their last seven games including a landmark victory over ranked rival Virginia. The 20–17 win over the No. 22 Cavaliers in the regular-season finale was particularly significant, as it was the first time both programs met as ranked opponents. The year culminated in a trip to the Independence Bowl in Shreveport, Louisiana, where Tech dismantled No. 21 Indiana 45–20. The postseason win was viewed by Beamer and the Hokie faithful as the program's "arrival" on the national stage, validating the "march toward the summit" described in program lore.

Statistically, Maurice DeShazo anchored the aerial attack, throwing for 2,080 yards and 22 touchdowns against seven interceptions while completing 134 of 230 passes. The rushing game was a multi-faceted effort led by Dwayne Thomas, who accumulated 629 yards and six touchdowns on 133 carries. Thomas was supported by Joe Swarm, who added 471 yards, and Tommy Edwards, who contributed 414 yards. Antonio Freeman emerged as a premier deep threat, leading all receivers with 704 yards and nine touchdowns on 38 catches. Bryan Still also proved vital to the passing game, recording 337 receiving yards.

The Hokie defense was characterized by its ability to disrupt backfields, totaling 66.0 tackles for loss and 33.0 sacks on the season. Linebacker George DelRicco led the unit with 135 total tackles, while the defensive front was bolstered by freshman sensation Cornell Brown, who recorded 11.0 tackles for loss and 4.0 sacks. Other defensive standouts included J.C. Price and Waverly Jackson, who combined for 13.0 tackles for loss. The secondary was opportunistic, led by Tyronne Drakeford’s five interceptions. Collectively, the unit's physical style of play complemented a special teams group that began to earn its reputation for blocking kicks, a hallmark of the era.

== Schedule ==
Date	Time	Opponent	Rank	Site	TV	Result	Attendance	Source
September 4	4:00 p.m.	Bowling Green*		Lane Stadium; Blacksburg, VA		W 33–16	37,737	
September 11	7:00 p.m.	at Pittsburgh		Pitt Stadium; Pittsburgh, PA		W 63–21	33,839	
September 18	4:00 p.m.	at No. 3 Miami (FL)		Miami Orange Bowl; Miami, FL (rivalry)		L 2–21	55,753	
September 25	1:00 p.m.	Maryland*		Lane Stadium; Blacksburg, VA		W 55–28	38,829	
October 2	12:00 p.m.	at No. 25 West Virginia		Mountaineer Field; Morgantown, WV (rivalry)	BEN	L 13–14	56,623	
October 16	1:00 p.m.	Temple		Lane Stadium; Blacksburg, VA		W 55–7	40,634	
October 23	1:00 p.m.	Rutgers^{†}		Lane Stadium; Blacksburg, VA		W 49–42	40,211	
October 30	1:00 p.m.	East Carolina*		Lane Stadium; Blacksburg, VA		W 31–12	34,306	
November 6	12:00 p.m.	at Boston College	No. 25	Alumni Stadium; Chestnut Hill, MA (rivalry)	BEN	L 34–48	32,698	
November 13	12:00 p.m.	Syracuse		Lane Stadium; Blacksburg, VA	BEN	W 45–24	44,722	
November 20	12:00 p.m.	at No. 23 Virginia*	No. 25	Scott Stadium; Charlottesville, VA (rivalry)	JPS	W 20–17	42,100	
December 31	12:30 p.m.	vs. No. 21 Indiana*	No. 22	Independence Stadium; Shreveport, LA (Independence Bowl)	ESPN	W 45–20	33,819	
*Non-conference game; ^{†}Homecoming; Rankings from AP Poll released prior to the game; All times are in Eastern time

== Rankings ==
Ranking movements Legend: ██ Increase in ranking ██ Decrease in ranking — = Not ranked
	Week																
Poll	Pre	1	2	3	4	5	6	7	8	9	10	11	12	13	14	15	Final
AP	—	—	—	—	—	—	—	—	—	—	25	—	25	22	22	22	22
Coaches Poll	—	—	—	—	—	—	—	—	—	24	23	—	23	20	20	21	20

== Game summaries ==
=== Bowling Green ===
Bowling Green at Virginia Tech

Team	1	2	3	4	Total
Bowling Green	7	3	0	6	16
• Virginia Tech	7	7	13	6	33

- Date: September 4, 1993
- Location: Lane Stadium, Blacksburg, VA
- Game attendance: 37,737
- Game weather: 73°F, Clear

Virginia Tech opened the 1993 season with a 33–16 victory over Bowling Green. The momentum shifted permanently in the third quarter when Tommy Edwards scored on a one-yard run capping a 15-play, 79-yard march—their longest drive of the day—to extend their lead and stifle any hopes of a Bowling Green upset.

The Hokies outgained the Falcons 485 to 282 in total offensive yardage, largely on the strength of a ground game that accounted for 256 yards.

After falling behind 7–0 on a 57-yard fumble return, Tech answered when Antonio Freeman caught a 46-yard touchdown pass. Steve Sanders added a 23-yard touchdown reception to take a lead the Hokies would never relinquish. In the second half, the rushing attack took over as Dwayne Thomas scored on a four-yard run and Tommy Edwards added two one-yard touchdown plunges. Tech’s final score came via an Edwards run, though the subsequent two-point conversion pass attempt failed.

Maurice DeShazo led the offense by completing 16 of 21 passes for 214 yards, two touchdowns, and one interception. The rushing attack was led by Dwayne Thomas, who gained 87 yards on 19 carries, and Joe Swarm, who totaled 75 yards on 13 attempts. Antonio Freeman was the leading receiver with 92 yards and a touchdown on five catches, while Steve Sanders contributed five receptions for 61 yards and a score. Bryan Still also aided the air attack with three catches for 36 yards.

The Virginia Tech defense held Bowling Green to just 45 net rushing yards while recording 3.0 tackles for loss and 1.0 sack for 13 yards. DeWayne Knight provided the unit's standout performance, registering the team's only sack and a tackle for loss as part of a three-tackle day. Scott Jones was the game's leading tackler with 10 total stops, while George DelRicco followed with eight tackles. Cornell Brown added four tackles and a fumble recovery to help limit the Falcons to a single offensive touchdown.

=== Pittsburgh ===
Virginia Tech at Pittsburgh

Team	1	2	3	4	Total
• Virginia Tech	21	21	14	7	63
Pittsburgh	3	3	15	0	21

- Date: September 11, 1993
- Location: Pitt Stadium, Pittsburgh, PA
- Game attendance: 33,839
- Game weather: 64°F, Cool

Virginia Tech secured a dominant 63–21 victory over Pittsburgh, marking the most points ever scored by a visiting team at Pitt Stadium and the first 2–0 start for the program since 1981. The win moved the Hokies to 2–0 (1–0 BIG EAST), while the Panthers dropped to 1–1 (0–1 BIG EAST). Head coach Frank Beamer fueled his team's performance by using local Pittsburgh newspaper clippings as motivation, responding to suggestions that the Hokies were a "second-tier program" and that the matchup "wasn't much" of a challenge for Pitt. This psychological strategy resulted in a clinical demolition where the Hokies' starters played less than 30 minutes of football.

The Hokie offense executed a historic scoring blitz, recording 42 points in a span of just 21 minutes during the first half to effectively end the contest. Tommy Edwards initiated the surge with a one-yard touchdown run, followed by a one-yard score from Dwayne Thomas and a 55-yard touchdown reception by Edwards. The second-quarter onslaught continued with another one-yard plunge by Edwards, a six-yard keeper by Maurice DeShazo, and a 14-yard touchdown pass to Kevin Martin. Following the intermission, Dwayne Thomas broke loose for a 70-yard touchdown run, while Edwards added his fourth rushing touchdown of the night from one yard out. Ranall White capped the record-setting performance with a two-yard touchdown run in the final frame.

Virginia Tech outgained Pittsburgh 675 to 290 in total yardage, establishing a then-school record for total offense and a record for team rushing with 500 yards. Dwayne Thomas led the ground attack with 170 yards and two touchdowns on 19 carries, while Ranall White added 81 yards on 12 attempts. Maurice DeShazo directed the passing game with high efficiency, completing 10 of 15 passes for 175 yards and two touchdowns without an interception. Steve Sanders was the leading receiver with three catches for 63 yards, supported by Tommy Edwards’ 55-yard scoring play.

The Hokie defense stifled the Panthers' attack, allowing only 14 first downs and recording 3.0 sacks for 16 yards. George DelRicco spearheaded the effort with 2.0 tackles for loss as part of a six-tackle performance, while Bernard Basham added 2.0 tackles for loss including a sack. Marcus McClung, Ken Brown, and Cornell Brown tied for the team lead with eight tackles each. The defensive front maintained constant pressure, forcing a fumble recovery by Chris Peduzzi and limiting Pitt to a meager 36.8% completion rate.

=== No. 3 Miami (FL) ===
Virginia Tech at Miami

Team	1	2	3	4	Total
Virginia Tech	0	0	0	2	2
• Miami	7	0	7	7	21

- Date: September 18, 1993
- Location: Orange Bowl, Miami, FL
- Game attendance: 55,753
- Game weather: 88°F, Partly Sunny

Virginia Tech fell to No. 3 Miami 21–2. While the Hokie defense kept the game competitive for three quarters, five turnovers—including three lost fumbles—proved insurmountable against the Hurricanes' elite speed. The atmosphere at the Orange Bowl served as a significant hurdle; historically, the venue had been a "house of horrors" for the program, and this "measuring stick" game illustrated that Tech still lacked the depth to compete with Top-5 teams for a full sixty minutes. Following the loss, Virginia Tech stood at 2–1 (1–1 BIG EAST), while Miami improved to 2–0.

Miami opened the scoring in the first quarter with a one-yard touchdown run by Larry Jones. The Hurricanes added to their lead in the third quarter when Frank Costa connected with A.C. Tellison for a 45-yard touchdown pass and finalized the scoring in the fourth with a one-yard plunge by Derrick Harris. Tech’s only points came late in the fourth quarter when Willie Wilkins blocked a Miami punt out of the end zone for a safety.

The Hokie offense struggled to move the ball, totaling only 176 yards of offense. Dwayne Thomas led the ground game with 41 yards on 14 carries, while Antonio Freeman added 38 yards on a reverse. Quarterback Maurice DeShazo completed 6 of 13 passes for 51 yards and threw one interception, while backup Jim Druckenmiller also threw an interception on his only attempt. Steve Sanders led all receivers with two catches for 18 yards.

The defense remained a bright spot, recording 10.0 tackles for loss and 5.0 sacks. Ken Brown was the leading tackler with 14 total stops and met the standout criteria with 2.0 tackles for loss and an interception. Lawrence Lewis also qualified as a standout with 2.0 sacks for a loss of 13 yards, while J.C. Price added 2.0 tackles for loss. Hank Coleman contributed to the effort with a sack and an additional tackle for loss. Despite holding the Hurricanes to 21 points, the unit was frequently forced to defend short fields due to the team's offensive miscues.

=== Maryland ===
Maryland at Virginia Tech

Team	1	2	3	4	Total
Maryland	7	7	0	14	28
• Virginia Tech	7	28	3	17	55

- Date: September 25, 1993
- Location: Lane Stadium, Blacksburg, VA
- Game attendance: 38,829
- Game weather: 55°F, Rain

Virginia Tech utilized a dominant 28-point second-quarter surge to overcome a steady rain and a prolific Maryland offense, ultimately securing a 55–28 victory at Lane Stadium. Played in adverse conditions, the contest featured a combined 1,290 yards of total offense as the Hokies effectively shed the "hard luck" reputation of previous seasons to maintain physical composure. This ability to execute under pressure in a high-scoring shootout illustrated a significant shift in the program's mindset following the previous week's loss at Miami. The win improved the Hokies to 3–1 (1–1 BIG EAST).

After Maryland took an early lead, Tommy Edwards tied the game with a five-yard touchdown run. The Hokies took control in the second period with 28 unanswered points, including a four-yard run by Edwards, a two-yard plunge by Dwayne Thomas, and two Maurice DeShazo touchdown passes to Antonio Freeman (20 yards) and Bryan Still (70 yards). In the second half, Ryan Williams converted field goals of 34 and 27 yards, while DeShazo added two more touchdown strikes to Freeman and Jermaine Holmes to finalize the scoring.

Virginia Tech’s offense was balanced and explosive, though they were technically outgained by Maryland 649 to 641 in total yardage. Tommy Edwards led the rushing attack with 144 yards and two touchdowns on 12 carries, while Dwayne Thomas contributed 93 yards and a score on 18 attempts. Maurice DeShazo finished the day 10 of 16 passing for 256 yards, four touchdowns, and one interception. Antonio Freeman led all receivers with 122 yards and two touchdowns on five receptions.

The Hokie defense recorded 7.0 tackles for loss and 2.0 sacks while forcing four turnovers. Ken Brown was the leading tackler with 13 total stops. Stacy Henley qualified as a standout, recording 6 tackles and 2.0 tackles for loss, while George DelRicco added 8 tackles and met the standout criteria with 2.0 tackles for loss and a blocked field goal. Antonio Banks anchored the secondary with two interceptions, and J.C. Price recorded a sack for a loss of 11 yards. Though the unit surrendered significant yardage to Maryland's passing game, the defensive front consistently pressured the Terrapins in the red zone to prevent a comeback.

=== No. 25 West Virginia ===
Virginia Tech at West Virginia

Team	1	2	3	4	Total
Virginia Tech	7	0	6	0	13
• West Virginia	0	0	8	6	14

- Date: October 2, 1993
- Location: Mountaineer Field, Morgantown, WV
- Game attendance: 56,623
- Game weather: 65°F, Cloudy

West Virginia defeated Virginia Tech 14–13 in a contest where the Hokies led early but were unable to withstand a late Mountaineer rally. Played before a capacity crowd in Morgantown, the game was characterized by a defensive stalemate in the first half and significant momentum shifts following a third-quarter safety. T The loss moved Virginia Tech to 3–2 (1–2 BIG EAST).

Virginia Tech took the initial lead with a 33-yard touchdown pass from Maurice DeShazo to Cornelius White. Following a scoreless second quarter, West Virginia narrowed the margin with a 38-yard field goal. On the ensuing Hokie possession, the Mountaineers swung the momentum when Brian Edmonds was tackled in the end zone for a safety, cutting the lead to 7–5 and forcing a free kick that allowed West Virginia to maintain offensive pressure. After the Mountaineers added a 44-yard field goal to take their first lead, the Hokies responded with a 46-yard touchdown strike from DeShazo to Steve Sanders, though the two-point conversion pass failed. West Virginia secured the winning margin with a one-yard touchdown run by Rodney Woodard following a 15-play drive.

West Virginia outgained Virginia Tech 370 to 314 in total offensive yardage. Maurice DeShazo led the passing attack, finishing 10 of 21 for 184 yards, two touchdowns, and no interceptions. Dwayne Thomas was the leading rusher with 53 yards on 11 carries, while Steve Sanders led all receivers with 106 yards and a touchdown on four receptions.

The Hokie defense recorded 4.0 tackles for loss for 11 yards and 1.0 sack for a loss of 7 yards. George DelRicco was the leading tackler with 16 total stops and recorded 3.0 tackles for loss. Antonio Banks finished with 11 tackles and 1.0 tackle for loss while contributing an interception. Despite forcing three fumbles and two interceptions, the unit surrendered the decisive score on the Mountaineers' final 6:37 possession.

=== Temple ===
Temple at Virginia Tech

Team	1	2	3	4	Total
Temple	0	7	0	0	7
• Virginia Tech	21	13	7	14	55

- Date: October 16, 1993
- Location: Lane Stadium, Blacksburg, VA
- Game attendance: 40,634
- Game weather: 60°F, Cloudy

Box Score

Virginia Tech dominated Temple 55–7 at Lane Stadium, rebounding from a narrow loss to West Virginia. The Hokies' offense was firing on all cylinders, racking up 552 total yards while the defense held the Owls to just a single score. The victory was a showcase for the DeShazo-to-Freeman connection, which accounted for three touchdowns in the first half alone. The win moved the Hokies to 4–2 (2–2 BIG EAST).

The game was effectively decided in the first quarter as Dwayne Thomas scored on a three-yard run and a massive 73-yard sprint. Maurice DeShazo then found Antonio Freeman for a 10-yard touchdown to make it 21–0. After Temple scored in the second, DeShazo and Freeman connected twice more on explosive plays of 63 and 52 yards. In the second half, the Hokies utilized their depth, with Steve Sanders catching a 52-yard touchdown pass and backup quarterback Jim Druckenmiller finding Bryan Still for a nine-yard score.

Dwayne Thomas led the rushing attack with 152 yards and two touchdowns on only 12 carries, averaging 12.7 yards per rush. Maurice DeShazo finished 17 of 28 for 325 yards and four touchdowns. Antonio Freeman had a career day, recording eight receptions for 194 yards and three touchdowns.

The Hokie defense was relentless, recording 4.0 sacks for a loss of 24 yards. Andy Miller led the team with 15 total tackles, followed closely by Ken Brown with 12. Defensive tackle J.C. Price and Jeff Holland each recorded a tackle for loss, while DeWayne Knight and Hank Coleman provided the pressure with a sack apiece. The unit limited Temple to just 14 first downs and forced two fumbles during the rout.

=== Rutgers ===
Rutgers at Virginia Tech

Team	1	2	3	4	Total
Rutgers	7	0	14	21	42
• Virginia Tech	7	28	14	0	49

- Date: October 23, 1993
- Location: Lane Stadium, Blacksburg, VA
- Game attendance: 40,211
- Game weather: 59°F, Sunny

Box Score

Virginia Tech secured a 49–42 victory over Rutgers in a game that evolved from a first-half rout into a nerve-wracking shootout at Lane Stadium. The Hokies appeared to have the contest decided by halftime with a commanding 35–7 lead, but a second-half collapse nearly resulted in the largest blown lead in program history. The win improved Virginia Tech to 5–2 (3–2 BIG EAST).

The Hokies dominated the second quarter, scoring 28 unanswered points. Dwayne Thomas and Brian Edmonds each recorded rushing scores, while Marcus McClung blocked a Rutgers punt that William Ferrell returned seven yards for a touchdown. Maurice DeShazo extended the lead to 28 points with a two-yard rushing score just before the break. Despite Rutgers finding some rhythm in the third quarter, Tech maintained a 49–21 lead late in the period following DeShazo’s touchdown strikes of 58 yards to Antonio Freeman and 49 yards to Steve Sanders.

However, the game tightened significantly in the fourth quarter due to a combination of Rutgers' aggressive no-huddle offense and Tech's sudden "fumbleitis." Rutgers quarterback Bryan Fortay exploited a tiring Hokie secondary, leading three consecutive touchdown drives. Meanwhile, the Hokies lost two critical fumbles in their own territory—one by DeShazo and one by Joe Swarm—which Rutgers converted into quick scores. The Scarlet Knights pulled within seven points following an eight-yard pass from Fortay to Mario Henry with just 57 seconds remaining. The Hokies finally secured the win by recovering the ensuing onside kick, allowing them to run out the clock.

Virginia Tech outgained Rutgers 505 to 494 in total yardage. Maurice DeShazo accounted for four touchdowns (three passing, one rushing) and 267 yards through the air. Dwayne Thomas led the rushing attack with 130 yards on 24 carries. Defensively, DeWayne Knight recorded 12 tackles and a sack, while George DelRicco added 10 tackles and 2.0 sacks. The unit was highly disruptive despite the late-game fatigue, recording 15.0 tackles for loss for 73 yards and pressuring Rutgers into 45 pass attempts.

=== East Carolina ===
East Carolina at Virginia Tech

Team	1	2	3	4	Total
East Carolina	0	12	0	0	12
• Virginia Tech	7	7	14	3	31

- Date: October 30, 1993
- Location: Lane Stadium, Blacksburg, VA
- Game attendance: 34,306
- Game weather: 47°F, Light Rain

Box Score

Virginia Tech overcame rainy conditions and a bizarre second-quarter lapse to defeat East Carolina 31–12 at Lane Stadium. The Hokies relied on a dominant ground game, rushing for 238 yards, and a ball-hawking defense that forced three interceptions to stifle the Pirates.

The game featured a chaotic sequence late in the second quarter. Leading 14–3, Tech quarterback Maurice DeShazo was pressured in his own end zone and fumbled; the ball was recovered by the Hokies for a safety. On the ensuing possession following the free kick, ECU quarterback Perez Mattison threw a 39-yard touchdown pass to Allen Williams, cutting the Hokies' lead to 14–12 at halftime. However, Virginia Tech regained control in the third quarter with a 54-yard drive capped by a 10-yard touchdown pass from DeShazo to Dwayne Thomas, followed by a three-yard touchdown run by Tommy Edwards.

Dwayne Thomas was the workhorse for the Hokies, recording 212 all-purpose yards by pairing 106 yards from scrimmage with 106 yards on kickoff returns. Thomas rushed for 79 yards and a touchdown while catching two passes for 27 yards and another score. Antonio Freeman provided the game's biggest highlight with a 52-yard touchdown reception in the second quarter. Maurice DeShazo was efficient despite the rain, completing 7 of 12 passes for 148 yards and two touchdowns. Tommy Edwards added 59 yards on the ground as the Hokies maintained possession for over 35 minutes.

The Hokie defense was led by Ken Brown, who recorded 10 tackles and a tackle for loss. Waverly Jackson added nine tackles and two tackles for loss, while the secondary effectively shut down the Pirates' passing attack. Torrian Gray, William Yarborough, and Scott Jones each recorded an interception. The unit was particularly effective in the second half, holding East Carolina scoreless and limiting them to just 258 total yards for the game.

=== Boston College ===
Virginia Tech at Boston College

Team	1	2	3	4	Total
Virginia Tech	0	14	13	7	34
• Boston College	14	14	6	14	48

- Date: November 6, 1993
- Location: Alumni Stadium, Chestnut Hill, MA
- Game attendance: 32,698
- Game weather: 58°F, Partly Cloudy

Box Score

In a high-scoring BIG EAST shootout at Alumni Stadium, No. 25 Virginia Tech fell 48–34 to Boston College. Despite amassing 509 yards of total offense and battling back from multiple double-digit deficits, the Hokies could not contain a record-setting Eagles attack. Boston College quarterback Glenn Foley threw for 448 yards and three touchdowns, while the Eagles' ground game added four scores to snap Tech’s winning streak. The loss moved Virginia Tech to 6–3 (4–2 BIG EAST).

The Hokies trailed 28–7 in the second quarter before rallying. Maurice DeShazo sparked the comeback with an 11-yard touchdown run, followed by a 2-yard Dwayne Thomas plunge just before halftime. The momentum continued in the third quarter when Brian Edmonds broke loose for a 37-yard touchdown run and later hauled in a 19-yard scoring pass from DeShazo, cutting the lead to 34–27. However, the Eagles responded with a 68-yard touchdown strike from Foley to Ivan Boyd to open the fourth quarter, effectively keeping the game out of reach. Jim Druckenmiller entered late and connected with Bryan Still for a 58-yard touchdown to provide the final margin.

Offensively, the Hokies were balanced, rushing for 230 yards and passing for 279. Brian Edmonds led the way with 98 all-purpose yards and two touchdowns, while Dwayne Thomas added 73 rushing yards and a score. Bryan Still was the leading receiver with 80 yards on three catches. DeShazo finished 11-of-22 for 174 yards but was hampered by two interceptions.

The defense was pushed to its limits by the Eagles' 617 total yards. Linebacker Ken Brown and George DelRicco were relentless, each recording 15 total tackles. Cornell Brown and Waverly Jackson each added six tackles, and the unit managed to force two fumbles. However, the secondary struggled against the Eagles' vertical passing game, which averaged over 15 yards per attempt. Special teams also proved costly as the Hokies missed two field goals and a point-after attempt during the comeback effort.

=== Syracuse ===
Syracuse at Virginia Tech

Team	1	2	3	4	Total
Syracuse	0	10	7	7	24
• Virginia Tech	21	3	14	7	45

- Date: November 13, 1993
- Location: Lane/Worsham Field, Blacksburg, Va.
- Game attendance: 44,722
- Game weather: 60, Cloudy, chnc of rain

Box Score

Virginia Tech defeated Syracuse 45–24 in a contest that secured the program’s first bowl invitation in seven years. The atmosphere at Lane Stadium was jubilant as the victory officially accepted a bid to the Independence Bowl, marking a significant turning point in the Frank Beamer era. The win moved Virginia Tech to 7–3 on the season.

The scoring began when Dwayne Thomas capped a nine-play drive with a one-yard touchdown run. Maurice DeShazo then connected with John Burke for a 23-yard touchdown, though the ensuing kick failed. Following a blocked punt by William Ferrell, Brian Edmonds scored on a seven-yard rush, and a successful two-point conversion pass from DeShazo to Cornelius White extended the lead. In the second quarter, Ryan J. Williams added a 22-yard field goal. Syracuse responded with an 86-yard kickoff return touchdown by Jeyson Wilson, but Pat O'Neill answered for the Hokies with a 48-yard field goal. In the third quarter, DeShazo found Burke again for a 28-yard touchdown. Moments later, DeWayne Knight returned a Syracuse fumble 23 yards for a score. Tommy Edwards provided the final Hokie touchdown on a three-yard run in the fourth quarter.

Maurice DeShazo led the passing attack, finishing 9-of-22 for 133 yards with two touchdowns and no interceptions. Dwayne Thomas spearheaded the rushing effort, recording 163 yards on 31 carries. John Burke was the leading receiver, totaling 51 yards on two receptions.

Virginia Tech outgained Syracuse 379 to 285 in total offensive yardage. The Hokie defense recorded 8.0 tackles for loss for 17 yards and 4.0 sacks for 25 yards. Defensive standouts included Ken Brown, who recorded 2.0 tackles for loss and 1.0 sack, and Jeff Holland, who contributed 2.0 sacks for 14 yards. Torrian Gray was the leading tackler for the defense, finishing the contest with 10 total tackles.

=== Virginia ===
Virginia Tech at Virginia

Team	1	2	3	4	Total
• Virginia Tech	3	14	0	3	20
Virginia	3	7	0	7	17

- Date: November 20, 1993
- Location: Scott Stadium, Charlottesville, VA
- Game attendance: 42,100
- Game weather: 51°F, Wind NW 19, Excellent

Box Score

Virginia Tech defeated Virginia 20–17 in a contest that saw the Hokies seize an early lead and then withstand a desperate fourth-quarter comeback attempt by the Cavaliers. The atmosphere at Scott Stadium shifted from early Hokie dominance to a tense finale as Tech's defense was forced to make a stand on the final play of the game to preserve the victory. The win moved Virginia Tech to 8–3 on the season and secured the program's first eight-win campaign and bowl appearance since 1986. The Charlotte Observer, November 21, 1993.

Ryan J. Williams opened the scoring with a 30-yard field goal following a blocked punt by Brandon Semones. After Virginia tied the game, Dwayne Thomas regained the lead for the Hokies with a six-yard touchdown run. On the very next play from scrimmage, Jeff Holland recovered a Cavalier fumble and returned it eight yards for a touchdown to create a 17–3 halftime lead. After the Cavaliers cut the deficit to three points late in the fourth quarter, Williams converted a 28-yard field goal to provide a cushion. Virginia responded with another touchdown and regained possession for a final drive, but the Tech defense forced an incomplete pass as time expired to seal the result.

Maurice DeShazo led the passing attack, finishing 19-of-31 for 153 yards with no touchdowns and one interception. Dwayne Thomas spearheaded the rushing effort, recording 89 yards on 25 carries. Cornelius White was the leading receiver, totaling 43 yards on four receptions.

Virginia outgained Virginia Tech 356 to 263 in total offensive yardage. The Hokie defense recorded 3.0 tackles for loss for 6 yards and 4.0 sacks for 32 yards. Defensive standouts included J.C. Price, who recorded 2.0 sacks for 13 yards, and Cornell Brown, who contributed 2.0 sacks for 19 yards. George DelRicco was the leading tackler for the defense, finishing the contest with 16 total tackles.

=== Indiana ===
1993 Independence Bowl: Virginia Tech vs. Indiana

Team	1	2	3	4	Total
• Virginia Tech	7	21	0	17	45
Indiana	7	6	0	7	20

- Date: December 31, 1993
- Location: Independence Stadium, Shreveport, LA
- Game attendance: 33,819
- Game weather: 49°F, Clear, Wind SE 8

Box Score

Virginia Tech defeated Indiana 45–20 in a game that turned on a wild sequence of defensive and special teams scores just before halftime. The atmosphere in Shreveport was defined by a massive momentum swing in the final seconds of the second quarter, as a tie game rapidly transformed into a two-touchdown Hokie lead. What began as a competitive back-and-forth affair ended in a rout as the Tech defense dominated the line of scrimmage, recording seven sacks and forcing multiple turnovers to dismantle the Hoosiers' offensive rhythm. The win moved the Hokies to 9–3 and secured the program's first bowl victory under Frank Beamer. The Times, January 1, 1994.

The scoring opened when Indiana took an early lead on a 75-yard touchdown pass, but Dwayne Thomas quickly answered for the Hokies with a 13-yard touchdown reception from Maurice DeShazo. Joe Swarm gave Tech its first lead with a six-yard scoring run, though Indiana responded with two field goals to pull within 14–13. The game’s decisive moment arrived in the final minute of the first half: Lawrence Lewis returned a fumble 20 yards for a touchdown, and on the very next play, Antonio Banks returned a blocked field goal 80 yards for another score as time expired. In the fourth quarter, Antonio Freeman caught a 42-yard touchdown pass, Tommy Edwards added a five-yard rushing touchdown, and Ryan J. Williams converted a 42-yard field goal to complete the Hokie scoring.

Maurice DeShazo anchored the offensive effort, completing 19-of-33 passes for 193 yards with two touchdowns and two interceptions. Dwayne Thomas led the ground game with 65 yards on 24 carries. Antonio Freeman was the leading receiver, totaling 66 yards on five receptions.

Virginia Tech outgained Indiana 318 to 296 in total offensive yardage.The Hokie defense systematically dismantled the Indiana offense, finishing the afternoon with 10.0 tackles for loss for 59 yards and 7.0 sacks for 62 yards. Ken Brown led the pass rush with 2.5 sacks for 20 yards, while Cornell Brown added 2.0 sacks for 13 yards to keep the Hoosiers behind the chains. The disruptive effort was rounded out by Bernard Basham and George DelRicco, who each recorded a sack and an additional tackle for loss. Torrian Gray and Antonio Banks anchored the secondary and the stat sheet, sharing the team lead with 9 total tackles apiece.
