= 1993 Syracuse Orangemen football team =

American college football season

1993 Syracuse Orangemen football
- Conference: Big East Conference
- Record: 6–4–1 (3–4 Big East)
- Head coach: Paul Pasqualoni (3rd season)
- Offensive coordinator: George DeLeone (7th season)
- Defensive coordinator: Kevin Coyle (3rd season)
- Captains: Marvin Graves; Dwayne Joseph; John Reagan
- Home stadium: Carrier Dome

1993 Big East Conference football standings
	Conf.					Overall
Team	W		L		T	W		L		T
No. 7 West Virginia $	7	–	0	–	0	11	–	1	–	0
No. 15 Miami (FL)	6	–	1	–	0	9	–	3	–	0
No. 13 Boston College	5	–	2	–	0	9	–	3	–	0
No. 22 Virginia Tech	4	–	3	–	0	9	–	3	–	0
Syracuse	3	–	4	–	0	6	–	4	–	1
Pittsburgh	2	–	5	–	0	3	–	8	–	0
Rutgers	1	–	6	–	0	4	–	7	–	0
Temple	0	–	7	–	0	1	–	10	–	0
$ – Conference champion; Rankings from AP Poll

The 1993 Syracuse Orangemen football team represented Syracuse University as a member of the Big East Conference during the 1993 NCAA Division I-A football season. Led by third-year head coach Paul Pasqualoni, the Orangemen compiled an overall record of 6–4–1 with a mark of 3–4 in conference play, placing fifth in the Big East. Syracuse played home games at the Carrier Dome in Syracuse, New York.

== Schedule ==
Date	Time	Opponent	Rank	Site	TV	Result	Attendance	Source
September 4	7:30 pm	Ball State*	No. 6	Carrier Dome; Syracuse, NY		W 35–12	45,090	
September 9	8:00 pm	at East Carolina*	No. 6	Ficklen Memorial Stadium; Greenville, NC	ESPN	W 41–22	33,055	
September 18	3:30 pm	at Texas*	No. 6	Texas Memorial Stadium; Austin, TX	ABC	T 21–21	65,897	
September 25	7:30 pm	Cincinnati*	No. 12	Carrier Dome; Syracuse, NY		W 24–21	48,312	
October 2	3:30 pm	Boston College	No. 13	Carrier Dome; Syracuse, NY	ABC	L 29–33	48,839	
October 16	12:00 pm	at Pittsburgh	No. 24	Pitt Stadium; Pittsburgh, PA (rivalry)	BEN	W 24–21	34,268	
October 23	7:30 pm	at No. 6 Miami (FL)	No. 23	Miami Orange Bowl; Miami, FL	ESPN	L 0–49	63,194	
October 30	7:30 pm	No. 13 West Virginia		Carrier Dome; Syracuse, NY (rivalry)	ESPN	L 0–43	49,268	
November 6	1:00 pm	Temple		Carrier Dome; Syracuse, NY		W 52–3	48,949	
November 13	12:00 pm	at Virginia Tech		Lane Stadium; Blacksburg, VA	BEN	L 24–45	44,722	
November 26	11:00 am	at Rutgers		Giants Stadium; East Rutherford, NJ	ABC	W 31–8	26,101	
*Non-conference game; Rankings from AP Poll released prior to the game; All times are in Eastern time

== Roster ==
1993 Syracuse Orangemen football team roster
Players
Coaches
Offense

Pos.	#	Name	Class
RB	42	Kirby Dar Dar	Jr
QB	5	Marvin Graves	Sr
WR	8	Marvin Harrison	So
WR	12	Shelby Hill	Sr
FB	32	Marcus Lee	Sr
RB	44	Terry Richardson	Sr
LT	74	Melvin Tuten	Jr
C	55	Dave Wohlabaugh	Jr
FB	38	Al Wooten	Sr

Defense

Pos.	#	Name	Class
DE	98	Ernie Brown	Jr
CB	9	Dwayne Joseph	Sr

Special teams

Pos.	#	Name	Class
P	4	Pat O'Neill	Sr

Head coach

- Paul Pasqualoni

Coordinators/assistant coaches

Legend

- (C) Team captain
- (S) Suspended
- (I) Ineligible
- Injured
- Redshirt
