= 1994 Carquest Bowl =

American college football game

Boston College Eagles	Virginia Cavaliers
(8–3)	(7–4)
Big East	ACC
31	13
Head coach: Tom Coughlin	Head coach: George Welsh
AP / Coaches / BC; 15 / 15 / 15
	1	2	3	4	Total
Boston College	3	14	7	7	31
Virginia	7	6	0	0	13
- Date: January 1, 1994
- Season: 1993
- Stadium: Joe Robbie Stadium
- Location: Miami Gardens, Florida
- MVP: QB Glenn Foley (Boston College)
- Referee: Richard Honig (Big Ten)
- Attendance: 38,516

United States TV coverage
- Network: CBS
- Announcers: Verne Lundquist and Dan Fouts

The 1994 Carquest Bowl was a college football postseason bowl game between the Boston College Eagles and the Virginia Cavaliers. This was the first year of sponsorship by Carquest, which continued until 1997.

== Background ==
Both teams finished 3rd in their respective conferences, the Cavaliers in the Atlantic Coast Conference and the Eagles in the Big East Conference.

== Game summary ==
Jamie Sharper tipped a pass from Foley to Randy Neal who ran back to the 19 yard line, which gave Virginia an early chance to score. Two plays later, Jerrod Washington scored on a 19-yard touchdown run to make it 7–0. David Gordon responded with a 19-yard field goal to cut the lead to four. Clarence Cannon caught a 78-yard pass from Glenn Foley to make it 10–7. Charles Way culminated a 91-yard, 12-play drive with a run for a touchdown to give Virginia the lead again, but the kick failed, leaving it at 13–10. 80 yards and 9 plays later, Cannon caught another pass from Foley for a touchdown to give the Eagles the halftime lead at 17–13. It was a fourth-and-three from the BC 30-yard line midway in the third quarter that proved to be a key misstep for Virginia, as they could not convert the down, leaving the ball back to the Eagles. Five plays later, Foley threw his third and final touchdown pass, this time to Keith Miller to increase the lead to 24–13. Darnell Campbell scored on a touchdown run early in the fourth quarter to make the final score 31–13 as Virginia lost a bowl game for the fourth time in four years. Foley went 25 of 36 with 391 yards passing and three touchdowns.

== Aftermath ==
Virginia returned to the bowl twice before the century ended, losing both times. Boston College returned in 2007, winning once again.

== Statistics ==
Statistics	Virginia	BC
First downs	16	27
Yards rushing	85	166
Yards passing	213	391
Total yards	298	562
Punts-Average	6-40.8	2-39.5
Fumbles-Lost	1-0	2–1
Interceptions	0	2
Penalties-Yards	3-35	4-33
