= 1993 Penn State Nittany Lions football team =

American college football season

1993 Penn State Nittany Lions football

Florida Citrus Bowl champion

Florida Citrus Bowl, W 31–13 vs. Tennessee
- Conference: Big Ten Conference

Ranking
- Coaches: No. 7
- AP: No. 8
- Record: 10–2 (6–2 Big Ten)
- Head coach: Joe Paterno (28th season)
- Offensive coordinator: Fran Ganter (10th season)
- Offensive scheme: Pro-style
- Defensive coordinator: Jerry Sandusky (17th season)
- Base defense: 4–3
- Captains: Lou Benfatti; Mike Malinoski; Brian O'Neal
- Home stadium: Beaver Stadium

1993 Big Ten Conference football standings
	Conf.					Overall
Team	W		L		T	W		L		T
No. 6 Wisconsin +	6	–	1	–	1	10	–	1	–	1
No. 11 Ohio State +	6	–	1	–	1	10	–	1	–	1
No. 8 Penn State	6	–	2	–	0	10	–	2	–	0
Indiana	5	–	3	–	0	8	–	4	–	0
No. 21 Michigan	5	–	3	–	0	8	–	4	–	0
Illinois	5	–	3	–	0	5	–	6	–	0
Michigan State	4	–	4	–	0	6	–	6	–	0
Iowa	3	–	5	–	0	6	–	6	–	0
Minnesota	3	–	5	–	0	4	–	7	–	0
Northwestern	0	–	8	–	0	2	–	9	–	0
Purdue	0	–	8	–	0	1	–	10	–	0
+ – Conference co-champions; Rankings from AP Poll

The 1993 Penn State Nittany Lions football team represented the Pennsylvania State University as a member of the Big Ten Conference during the 1993 NCAA Division I-A football season. Led by 28th-year head coach Joe Paterno, the Nittany Lions compiled an overall record of 10–2 with a mark of 6–2 in conference play, placing third in the Big Ten. Penn State was invited to the Florida Citrus Bowl, where the Nittany Lions defeated Tennessee. The team played home games at Beaver Stadium in University Park, Pennsylvania.

This was Penn State's first season as a member of the Big Ten. As a result, Penn State played their first ever games against Minnesota, Michigan, Indiana, and Northwestern.

== Schedule ==
Date	Time	Opponent	Rank	Site	TV	Result	Attendance	Source
September 4	1:00 p.m.	Minnesota	No. 17	Beaver Stadium; University Park, PA (Governor's Victory Bell)		W 38–20	95,387	
September 11	3:30 p.m.	USC*	No. 15	Beaver Stadium; University Park, PA	ABC	W 21–20	95,992	
September 18	3:30 p.m.	at Iowa	No. 14	Kinnick Stadium; Iowa City, IA	ABC	W 31–0	70,397	
September 25	7:30 p.m.	Rutgers*	No. 9	Beaver Stadium; University Park, PA	ESPN	W 31–7	95,092	
October 2	7:00 p.m.	at Maryland*	No. 9	Byrd Stadium; College Park, MD (rivalry)		W 70–7	42,008	
October 16	12:00 p.m.	No. 18 Michigan	No. 7	Beaver Stadium; University Park, PA (rivalry)	ABC	L 13–21	96,719	
October 30	3:30 p.m.	at No. 3 Ohio State	No. 12	Ohio Stadium; Columbus, OH (rivalry)	ABC	L 6–24	95,060	
November 6	1:00 p.m.	No. 17 Indiana^{†}	No. 19	Beaver Stadium; University Park, PA		W 38–31	91,000	
November 13	3:30 p.m.	Illinois	No. 16	Beaver Stadium; University Park, PA	ABC	W 28–14	90,000	
November 20	2:00 p.m.	at Northwestern	No. 14	Dyche Stadium; Evanston, IL		W 43–21	30,355	
November 27	12:00 p.m.	at No. 25 Michigan State	No. 14	Spartan Stadium; East Lansing, MI (rivalry)	ABC	W 38–37	53,482	
January 1, 1994	1:00 p.m.	vs. No. 6 Tennessee*	No. 13	Florida Citrus Bowl; Orlando, FL (Florida Citrus Bowl)	ABC	W 31–13	72,456	
*Non-conference game; ^{†}Homecoming; Rankings from AP Poll released prior to the game; All times are in Eastern time

== Game summaries ==
=== Ohio State ===
Penn State Nittany Lions at Ohio State Buckeyes

Quarter	1	2	3	4	Total
Penn St	6	0	0	0	6
Ohio St	7	10	7	0	24

at Ohio Stadium, Columbus, Ohio

- Date: October 30, 1993
- Game time: 3:30 p.m.
- Game weather: Snow flurries, 34 °F (1 °C)
- Game attendance: 95,060
- Referee: Dick Honig
- TV announcers (ABC): Keith Jackson and Bob Griese
- Box Score

Game information

First quarter

- PSU – Craig Fayak 29-yard field goal, 12:54. Penn St 3–0. Drive: 13 plays, 53 yards, 2:06.
- OSU – Raymont Harris 4-yard run (Tim Williams kick), 10:03. Ohio St 7–3. Drive: 8 plays, 65 yards, 2:43.
- PSU – Craig Fayak 49-yard field goal, 7:39. Ohio St 7–6. Drive: 8 plays, 34 yards, 2:24.

Second quarter

- OSU – Tim Williams 22-yard field goal, 14:56. Ohio St 10–6. Drive: 10 plays, 49 yards, 4:23.
- OSU – Joey Galloway 25-yard pass from Bret Powers (Tim Williams kick), 11:19. Ohio St 17–6. Drive: 8 plays, 64 yards, 3:24.

Third quarter

- OSU – Butler By'not'e 4-yard run (Tim Williams kick), 10:17. Ohio St 24–6. Drive: 9 plays, 68 yards, 4:43.

Top passers

- PSU – Kerry Collins – 13/39, 122 yards, 4 INT
- OSU – Bobby Hoying – 4/11, 107 yards

Top rushers

- PSU – Ki-Jana Carter – 24 rushes, 123 yards
- OSU – Raymont Harris – 32 rushes, 151 yards, TD

Top receivers

- PSU – Kyle Brady – 4 receptions, 36 yards
- OSU – Chris Sanders – 2 receptions, 56 yards

== Roster ==
1993 Penn State Nittany Lions football team roster
Players
Coaches
Offense

Pos.	#	Name	Class
RB	2	Mike Archie	So
TE	81	Kyle Brady	Jr
RB	32	Ki-Jana Carter	So
QB	12	Kerry Collins	Jr
WR	10	Bobby Engram	So
C	60	Bucky Greeley	Jr
G	50	Jeff Hartings	So
RB	25	Kim Herring	Fr
OT	68	Andre Johnson	So
RB	29	Brian O'Neal	Sr
G	54	Marco Rivera	So
QB	9	John Sacca	Jr
FB	38	Jon Witman	So

Defense

Pos.	#	Name	Class
DT	55	Lou Benfatti	Sr
S	46	Marlon Forbes	Jr
LB	16	Brian Gelzheiser	Jr
CB	21	Shelly Hammonds	Sr
LB	51	Greg Haren	So
LB	80	Rob Holmberg	Sr
LB	92	Terry Killens	So
DT	97	Tyoka Jackson	Sr
DT	93	Brandon Noble	Fr
LB	94	Eric Ravotti	Sr
LB	52	Willie Smith	Jr

Special teams

Pos.	#	Name	Class

Head coach

- Joe Paterno

Coordinators/assistant coaches

- Earnest Wilson (GA)

Legend

- (C) Team captain
- (S) Suspended
- (I) Ineligible
- Injured
- Redshirt

Roster

== NFL draft ==
Four Nittany Lions were drafted in the 1994 NFL draft.

Round	Pick	Overall	Name	Position	Team
3rd	29	94	Lou Benfatti	Defensive tackle	New York Jets
5th	3	134	Shelly Hammonds	Defensive back	Minnesota Vikings
6th	29	180	Eric Ravotti	Linebacker	Pittsburgh Steelers
7th	23	217	Rob Holmberg	Linebacker	Los Angeles Raiders
