= Thomas Lewis (American football) =

American football player (born 1972)

No. 81
- Position: Wide receiver

Personal information
- Born: January 10, 1972 (age 54); Akron, Ohio, U.S.
- Listed height: 6 ft 1 in (1.85 m)
- Listed weight: 195 lb (88 kg)

Career information
- High school: Garfield (Akron)
- College: Indiana
- NFL draft: 1994: 1st round, 24th overall pick

Career history
- New York Giants (1994–1997); Chicago Bears (1998)*; San Diego Chargers (1999)*
- * Offseason or practice squad member only

Career NFL statistics
- Receptions: 74
- Receiving yards: 1,032
- Receiving touchdowns: 5
- Stats at Pro Football Reference

Thomas A. Lewis (born January 10, 1972) is an American former professional football player who was a wide receiver in the National Football League (NFL) for the Chicago Bears and New York Giants. He was selected by the Giants in the first round of the 1994 NFL draft out of Indiana University with the 24th pick. While at Indiana, he set a Big Ten record and tied an NCAA record with a 99-yard touchdown reception against Penn State on November 6, 1993. That same day, he set a Big Ten record with 285 receiving yards. Thomas Lewis was the Varsity head coach at Chaparral High School in Scottsdale, Arizona for 2 years before resigning on January 12, 2018. He was the last Hoosier to be drafted in the first round until the Las Vegas Raiders drafted Indiana quarterback Fernando Mendoza with the first overall pick 32 years later.

== Early life ==
Lewis attended Garfield High School in Akron, Ohio, where he was an All-Ohio Honorable Mention pick. During his three-year prep career he made 120 receptions, and 14 touchdowns.
