= 1993 Miami Hurricanes football team =

American college football season

1993 Miami Hurricanes football

Fiesta Bowl, L 0–29 vs. Arizona
- Conference: Big East Conference

Ranking
- Coaches: No. 15
- AP: No. 15
- Record: 9–3 (6–1 Big East)
- Head coach: Dennis Erickson (5th season)
- Offensive coordinator: Rich Olson (2nd season)
- Offensive scheme: One-back spread
- Co-defensive coordinators: Greg McMackin (1st season); Tommy Tuberville (1st season)
- Base defense: 4–3
- MVP: Kevin Patrick
- Home stadium: Miami Orange Bowl

1993 Big East Conference football standings
	Conf.					Overall
Team	W		L		T	W		L		T
No. 7 West Virginia $	7	–	0	–	0	11	–	1	–	0
No. 15 Miami (FL)	6	–	1	–	0	9	–	3	–	0
No. 13 Boston College	5	–	2	–	0	9	–	3	–	0
No. 22 Virginia Tech	4	–	3	–	0	9	–	3	–	0
Syracuse	3	–	4	–	0	6	–	4	–	1
Pittsburgh	2	–	5	–	0	3	–	8	–	0
Rutgers	1	–	6	–	0	4	–	7	–	0
Temple	0	–	7	–	0	1	–	10	–	0
$ – Conference champion; Rankings from AP Poll

The 1993 Miami Hurricanes football team represented the University of Miami during the 1993 NCAA Division I-A football season. It was the Hurricanes' 68th season of football and third as a member of the Big East Conference. The Hurricanes were led by fifth-year head coach Dennis Erickson and played their home games at the Orange Bowl. They finished the season 9–3 overall and 6–1 in the Big East to finish in second place. They were invited to the Fiesta Bowl where they lost to Arizona, 29–0.

== Schedule ==
Date	Time	Opponent	Rank	Site	TV	Result	Attendance	Source
September 4	3:30 pm	at No. 20 Boston College	No. 3	Alumni Stadium; Chestnut Hill, MA	ESPN College Football	W 23–7	33,298	
September 18	4:00 pm	Virginia Tech	No. 3	Miami Orange Bowl; Miami, FL (rivalry)		W 21–2	55,753	
September 25	3:30 pm	at No. 13 Colorado*	No. 3	Folsom Field; Boulder, CO	ABC	W 35–29	52,391	
October 2	4:00 pm	No. 7 (I-AA) Georgia Southern*	No. 3	Miami Orange Bowl; Miami, FL		W 30–7	43,147	
October 9	12:00 pm	at No. 1 Florida State*	No. 3	Doak Campbell Stadium; Tallahassee, FL (rivalry)	ABC	L 10–28	77,813	
October 23	7:30 pm	No. 23 Syracuse	No. 6	Miami Orange Bowl; Miami, FL	ESPN	W 49–0	63,194	
October 30	12:00 pm	Temple	No. 4	Miami Orange Bowl; Miami, FL	BEN	W 42–7	33,927	
November 6	12:00 pm	at Pittsburgh	No. 4	Pitt Stadium; Pittsburgh, PA	BEN	W 35–7	32,064	
November 13	4:00 pm	Rutgers	No. 3	Miami Orange Bowl; Miami, FL		W 31–17	52,561	
November 20	3:30 pm	at No. 9 West Virginia	No. 4	Mountaineer Field; Morgantown, WV	ABC	L 14–17	70,222	
November 27	7:30 pm	Memphis State*	No. 9	Miami Orange Bowl; Miami, FL	ESPN	W 41–17	38,737	
January 1	1:00 pm	vs. No. 16 Arizona*	No. 10	Sun Devil Stadium; Tempe, AZ (Fiesta Bowl)	NBC	L 0–29	72,260	
*Non-conference game; Rankings from AP Poll released prior to the game; All times are in Eastern time

== Game summaries ==
=== At Florida State ===
Miami (FL) at Florida State

Team	1	2	3	4	Total
Hurricanes	7	0	0	3	10
• Seminoles	14	7	0	7	28

- Date: October 9
- Location: Doak Campbell Stadium
- Game attendance: 77,813

Scoring summary
Q1	FSU	Jackson 69 yard run (Bentley kick)	FSU 7–0
Q1	MIA	Bennett 6 yard pass from Costa (Prewitt kick)	Tie 7–7
Q1	FSU	Frier 72 yard pass from Ward (Bentley kick)	FSU 14–7
Q2	FSU	Ward 2 yard run (Bentley kick)	FSU 21–7
Q4	MIA	Prewitt 23 yard field goal	FSU 21–10
Q4	FSU	Bush 40 yard interception return (Bentley kick)	FSU 28–10

=== Syracuse ===
Team	1	2	3	4	Total
Syracuse	0	0	0	0	0
• Miami (FL)	14	14	14	7	49

- Date: October 23
- Location: Orange Bowl, Miami, FL
- Game attendance: 63,194

Scoring summary
1	MIA	Stewart 1-yard run (Prewitt kick)	MIA 7-0
1	MIA	Stewart 5-yard run (Prewitt kick)	MIA 14-0
2	MIA	Harris 3-yard run (Prewitt kick)	MIA 21-0
2	MIA	Holmes 11-yard interception return (Prewitt kick)	MIA 28-0
3	MIA	Collins 1-yard run (Prewitt kick)	MIA 35-0
3	MIA	Tucker 10-yard pass from Collins (Prewitt kick)	MIA 42-0
4	MIA	Jones 5-yard run (Barnwell kick)	MIA 49-0

== Roster ==
1993 Miami Hurricanes football team roster
Players
Coaches
Offense

Pos.	#	Name	Class
FB	30	Donnell Bennett	Jr
QB	11	Frank Costa	Jr
WR	7	Jammi German	Fr
RB	28	James Stewart	So

Defense

Pos.	#	Name	Class
LB	49	Robert Bass	Sr
DT	94	Dwayne Johnson	Jr
LB	52	Ray Lewis	Fr
DE	93	RJ Davis	Sr
DE	86	Kevin Patrick	Sr
DT	43	Patrick Riley	Jr
DT	76	Warren Sapp	So
DB	34	Dexter Seigler	Sr
LB	50	Lawrence Heartley	So

Special teams

Pos.	#	Name	Class
P	17	Maurice Washington	So

Head coach

- Dennis Erickson

Coordinators/assistant coaches

Legend

- (C) Team captain
- (S) Suspended
- (I) Ineligible
- Injured
- Redshirt

Roster

== Awards and honors ==
=== Jack Harding University of Miami MVP Award ===
- Kevin Patrick, DE

== 1994 NFL draft ==
Player	Position	Round	Pick	NFL club
Donnell Bennett	Running back	2nd	58	Kansas City Chiefs
Darren Krein	Defensive end	5th	150	San Diego Chargers
