= 1993 West Virginia Mountaineers football team =

American college football season

1993 West Virginia Mountaineers football

Big East champion Lambert-Meadowlands Trophy

Sugar Bowl, L 7–41 vs. Florida
- Conference: Big East Conference

Ranking
- Coaches: No. 6
- AP: No. 7
- Record: 11–1 (7–0 Big East)
- Head coach: Don Nehlen (14th season)
- Defensive coordinator: Steve Dunlap (2nd season)
- Home stadium: Mountaineer Field

1993 Big East Conference football standings
	Conf.					Overall
Team	W		L		T	W		L		T
No. 7 West Virginia $	7	–	0	–	0	11	–	1	–	0
No. 15 Miami (FL)	6	–	1	–	0	9	–	3	–	0
No. 13 Boston College	5	–	2	–	0	9	–	3	–	0
No. 22 Virginia Tech	4	–	3	–	0	9	–	3	–	0
Syracuse	3	–	4	–	0	6	–	4	–	1
Pittsburgh	2	–	5	–	0	3	–	8	–	0
Rutgers	1	–	6	–	0	4	–	7	–	0
Temple	0	–	7	–	0	1	–	10	–	0
$ – Conference champion; Rankings from AP Poll

The 1993 West Virginia Mountaineers football team represented West Virginia University as a member of the Big East Conference during the 1993 NCAA Division I-A football season. Led by 14th-year head coach Don Nehlen, the Mountaineers compiled an overall record of 11–1 with a mark of 7–0 in conference play, winning the Big East title in the conference first year of round-robin play. West Virginia earned a berth in the Sugar Bowl, where the Mountaineers lost to Florida. The team played home games at Mountaineer Field in Morgantown, West Virginia.

== Schedule ==
Date	Time	Opponent	Rank	Site	TV	Result	Attendance	Source
September 4	1:00 p.m.	Eastern Michigan*		Mountaineer Field; Morgantown, WV		W 48–6	50,483	
September 18	7:00 p.m.	at Maryland*		Byrd Stadium; College Park, MD (rivalry)		W 42–37	42,008	
September 25	1:00 p.m.	Missouri*		Mountaineer Field; Morgantown, WV		W 35–3	53,214	
October 2	12:00 p.m.	Virginia Tech	No. 25	Mountaineer Field; Morgantown, WV (rivalry)	BETV	W 14–13	56,623	
October 9	12:00 p.m.	No. 17 Louisville*^{†}	No. 24	Mountaineer Field; Morgantown, WV		W 36–34	57,578	
October 23	12:00 p.m.	Pittsburgh	No. 18	Mountaineer Field; Morgantown, WV (Backyard Brawl)	BETV	W 42–21	65,041	
October 30	7:30 p.m.	at Syracuse	No. 13	Carrier Dome; Syracuse, NY (rivalry)	ESPN	W 43–0	49,268	
November 6	1:00 p.m.	Rutgers	No. 11	Mountaineer Field; Morgantown, WV		W 58–22	51,339	
November 13	12:00 p.m.	at Temple	No. 9	Veterans Stadium; Philadelphia, PA	BETV	W 49–7	7,128	
November 20	3:30 p.m.	No. 4 Miami (FL)	No. 9	Mountaineer Field; Morgantown, WV	ABC	W 17–14	70,222	
November 26	4:00 p.m.	at No. 11 Boston College	No. 5	Alumni Stadium; Chestnut Hill, MA	ESPN	W 17–14	33,298	
January 1	8:30 p.m.	vs. No. 8 Florida*	No. 3	Louisiana Superdome; New Orleans, LA (Sugar Bowl)	ABC	L 7–41	75,437	
*Non-conference game; ^{†}Homecoming; Rankings from AP Poll released prior to the game; All times are in Eastern time; Source:

== Season summary ==
The 1993 season began with an uncertainty at quarterback. Both Darren Studstill and Jake Kelchner were up for the spot, but coach Don Nehlen decided to have a rotation each game while playing freshman Chad Johnston a few games. Star running back Adrian Murrell was replaced that season by Robert Walker and All-American center Mike Compton was replaced by Dale Williams. Tackle Rich Braham provided help to Walker in the run game. Young Aaron Beasley and Mike Logan led the secondary.

The first game against Eastern Michigan University was an easy win. The next was against the University of Maryland. Kelchner passed for 270 yards and Harold Kidd grabbed a big interception to seal the win, 42–37. The next week, the Mountaineers blew by the University of Missouri 35–3 in Morgantown. In that game, Mike Collins returned a fumble 97 yards for a score and Vann Washington took an interception 27-yards for another score.

The next week was a close win against Virginia Tech, 14–13. The Mountaineers won, despite turning the ball over five times, when the Tech kicker Ryan Williams missed a 44-yard field goal. The next game was against the University of Louisville, one of the toughest games of the season. Led by Brian Brohm's older brother, Jeff Brohm, the Cardinals were undefeated like the Mountaineers. But Robert Walker score three times, and led the Mountaineers to a close 36–34 win. The win led the Mountaineers into the Top 15 in the country. The next game, against the University of Pittsburgh, had a close first quarter. But Robert Walker rushed for over 150 yards and Mike Baker caught a couple of touchdown passes to pull away and win, 42–21.

The next game was a revengeful game. In 1992, West Virginia played the University of Syracuse, when a massive fight occurred. In a controversial decision, three Mountaineers were ejected, while only one Orangeman was ejected. That led to the Syracuse win. In the '93 version of the game, after missing two field goals, the Mountaineers were up 7–0 at halftime. But in the second half, the Mountaineer exploded. After a 90-yard run by Robert Walker, the Mountaineers won 43–0.

After beating Rutgers and Temple University, the Mountaineers were 9–0. In one of the biggest games in Mountaineer history, the #4 University of Miami came to Morgantown and played before a record Mountaineer Field crowd of 70,222, a mark that still stands today. The game was close, but Robert Walker won the game when he took a run to the sideline in the fourth quarter. Up 17–14, with four minutes left, Jake Kelchner threw a 40-yard bomb to seal the game.

After the game, Jake Kelchner injured his arm and Vann Washington had leg problems. The next game was against Boston College, who was coming off an upset win of their own over then #1 Notre Dame, the Mountaineers were almost taken by surprise. Down 11 points with 13 minutes left, Don Nehlen told defensive coordinator Steve Dunlap to put in Keith Jones and Mike Logan. The next play, Jones hit the fullback, resulting in a fumble which was recovered by the Mountaineers. Darren Studstill drove 63-yards downfield, and hit Eddie Hill for one of the greatest scores in West Virginia history. West Virginia finished the season 11–0, their second undefeated season.

=== Sugar Bowl ===
Although the Mountaineers finished the season as one of only two undefeated and untied teams eligible for a bowl game, alongside Coaches' Poll #1 Nebraska, they were denied a chance to play in the Orange Bowl, that year's de facto national championship game. Auburn was also undefeated but was on probation. West Virginia finished second in the final regular-season Coaches' Poll, but was only third in the final regular-season AP Poll behind #2 Nebraska and #1 Florida State. The margin between Florida State and West Virginia was large enough to drop the Mountaineers to third in the "Bowl Poll," a combination of the points from both polls which the Bowl Coalition used to set bowl matchups.

Instead, West Virginia was scheduled to play the Florida Gators in the Sugar Bowl. After an 80-yard drive that led to a touchdown pass, the Mountaineers then stopped the Gators on their first drive. The next Gator drive almost went three-and-out, until a personal foul on Steve Perkins gave Florida the momentum. Jake Kelchner was playing a good game, but then Nehlen surprised many by putting Studstill in. On the Mountaineers' first drive, Studstill threw an interception that the Gators returned for a touchdown. Florida ran off with the game after that, winning 41–7, ending any claim West Virginia might have had at a national championship. Florida State beat the same Florida team on the road by a 33–21 score.

Coach Don Nehlen said of the game, "We had wanted to play Nebraska in the Orange Bowl as the only two undefeated teams, but the Bowl Coalition didn't like the match. Instead, we were slotted to play Texas A&M in the Cotton Bowl Classic. Instead, the Sugar Bowl paid more money so the conference and administration wanted us to play Florida. If we wanted the best chance to win, we should have taken the Cotton; playing a slower, more physical team outdoors would have worked to our advantage a lot more than playing those Florida speed-burners indoors on a smooth surface."

== Roster ==
1993 West Virginia Mountaineers football team roster
Players
Coaches
Offense

Pos.	#	Name	Class
WR	5	Ed Hill	Sr
QB	14	Darren Studstill	Sr
QB	17	Jake Kelchner	Sr
WR	18	Jay Kearney	Sr
G	74	Jim LeBlanc	Sr
OT	78	Rich Braham	Sr
TE	82	Lovett Purnell	So

Defense

Pos.	#	Name	Class
DB	23	Mike Logan	Fr
CB	32	Aaron Beasley	So
DT	93	John Browning	So

Special teams

Pos.	#	Name	Class
P	16	Todd Sauerbrun	Jr

Head coach

- Don Nehlen

Coordinators/assistant coaches

Legend

- (C) Team captain
- (S) Suspended
- (I) Ineligible
- Injured
- Redshirt

== Team players in the NFL ==
Player	Position	Round	Pick	NFL club
Rich Braham	Center	3	76	Arizona Cardinals
Jay Kearney	Wide Receiver	6	169	Green Bay Packers
Darren Studstill	Wide Receiver	6	191	Dallas Cowboys
