= 1993 NCAA Division I-A football rankings =

- Season: 1993
- Bowl season: 1993–94 bowl games
- Preseason No. 1: Florida State
- End of season champions: Florida State

Two human polls comprised the 1993 National Collegiate Athletic Association (NCAA) Division I-A football rankings. Unlike most sports, college football's governing body, the NCAA, does not bestow a national championship, instead that title is bestowed by one or more different polling agencies. There are two main weekly polls that begin in the preseason—the AP Poll and the Coaches Poll.

== Legend ==
	Increase in ranking
	Decrease in ranking
	Not ranked previous week
	National champion
(#–#)	Win–loss record
(Italics)	Number of first place votes
т	Tied with team above or below also with this symbol

== AP Poll ==
	Preseason Aug 24	Week 1 Aug 31	Week 2 Sep 7	Week 3 Sep 14	Week 4 Sep 21	Week 5 Sep 28	Week 6 Oct 5	Week 7 Oct 12	Week 8 Oct 19	Week 9 Oct 26	Week 10 Nov 2	Week 11 Nov 9	Week 12 Nov 16	Week 13 Nov 23	Week 14 Nov 30	Week 15 Dec 7	Week 16 (Final) Jan 3	
1.	Florida State (42)	Florida State (1–0) (47)	Florida State (2–0) (50)	Florida State (3–0) (59)	Florida State (4–0) (57)	Florida State (4–0) (58)	Florida State (5–0) (61)	Florida State (6–0) (61)	Florida State (7–0) (62)	Florida State (7–0) (62)	Florida State (8–0) (62)	Florida State (9–0) (62)	Notre Dame (10–0) (62)	Florida State (10–1) (33)	Florida State (11–1) (42)	Florida State (11–1) (42)	Florida State (12–1) (46)	1.
2.	Alabama (14)	Alabama (0–0) (11)	Alabama (1–0) (10)	Alabama (2–0) (3)	Alabama (3–0) (5)	Alabama (4–0) (4)	Alabama (5–0) (1)	Alabama (5–0) (1)	Notre Dame (7–0)	Notre Dame (8–0)	Notre Dame (9–0)	Notre Dame (9–0)	Florida State (9–1)	Nebraska (10–0) (20)	Nebraska (11–0) (17)	Nebraska (11–0) (15)	Notre Dame (11–1) (12)	2.
3.	Michigan (3)	Miami (FL) (0–0) (2) т	Michigan (1–0) (2)	Miami (FL) (1–0)	Miami (FL) (2–0)	Miami (FL) (3–0)	Miami (FL) (4–0)	Notre Dame (6–0)	Ohio State (6–0)	Ohio State (7–0)	Ohio State (8–0)	Miami (FL) (7–1)	Nebraska (10–0)	Auburn (11–0) (6)	West Virginia (11–0)	West Virginia (11–0) (3)	Nebraska (11–1)	3.
4.	Texas A&M	Michigan (0–0) (2) т	Miami (FL) (1–0)	Notre Dame (2–0)	Notre Dame (3–0)	Notre Dame (4–0)	Notre Dame (5–0)	Florida (5–0)	Alabama (5–0–1)	Miami (FL) (5–1)	Miami (FL) (6–1)	Nebraska (9–0)	Miami (FL) (8–1)	Notre Dame (10–1) (1)	Auburn (11–0) (2)	Notre Dame (10–1) (1)	Auburn (11–0) (4)	4.
5.	Miami (FL)	Texas A&M (0–0)	Texas A&M (1–0)	Tennessee (2–0)	Florida (3–0)	Florida (3–0)	Florida (4–0)	Ohio State (5–0)	Nebraska (6–0)	Alabama (6–0–1)	Alabama (7–0–1)	Ohio State (8–0–1)	Ohio State (9–0–1)	West Virginia (10–0) (1)	Notre Dame (10–1)	Auburn (11–0) (1)	Florida (11–2)	5.
6.	Syracuse	Syracuse (0–0) (1)	Syracuse (1–0)	Syracuse (2–0)	Nebraska (3–0)	Nebraska (4–0)	Ohio State (4–0)	Nebraska (5–0)	Miami (FL) (4–1)	Nebraska (7–0)	Nebraska (8–0)	Tennessee (7–1–1)	Auburn (10–0)	Tennessee (8–1–1)	Tennessee (9–1–1)	Tennessee (9–1–1)	Wisconsin (10–1–1)	6.
7.	Notre Dame	Notre Dame (0–0)	Florida (1–0)	Colorado (2–0)	Ohio State (3–0)	Ohio State (3–0)	Nebraska (4–0)	Penn State (5–0)	Arizona (6–0)	Arizona (7–0)	Tennessee (6–1–1)	Auburn (9–0)	Tennessee (7–1–1)	Florida (9–1)	Texas A&M (10–1)	Texas A&M (10–1)	West Virginia (11–1)	7.
8.	Nebraska	Florida (0–0)	Tennessee (1–0)	Nebraska (2–0)	Michigan (1–1)	Michigan (2–1)	Penn State (5–0)	Miami (FL) (4–1)	Tennessee (5–1–1)	Tennessee (5–1–1)	Auburn (8–0)	Florida (7–1)	Florida (8–1)	Texas A&M (9–1)	Miami (FL) (9–2)	Florida (10–2)	Penn State (10–2)	8.
9.	Florida	Nebraska (0–0)	Nebraska (1–0)	Florida (2–0)	Penn State (3–0)	Penn State (4–0)	Michigan (3–1)	Oklahoma (5–0)	Florida (5–1)	Auburn (7–0)	Florida (6–1)	West Virginia (8–0)	West Virginia (9–0)	Miami (FL) (8–2)	Florida (9–2)	Wisconsin (9–1–1)	Texas A&M (10–2)	9.
10.	Tennessee	Tennessee (0–0)	Colorado (1–0)	Michigan (1–1)	Oklahoma (2–0)	Oklahoma (3–0)	Oklahoma (4–0)	Tennessee (5–1)	Auburn (7–0)	Florida (5–1)	Texas A&M (7–1)	UCLA (7–2)	Texas A&M (8–1)	Wisconsin (8–1–1)	Wisconsin (8–1–1)	Miami (FL) (9–2)	Arizona (10–2)	10.
11.	Colorado	Colorado (0–0)	Notre Dame (1–0)	Ohio State (2–0)	Tennessee (2–1)	Tennessee (3–1)	Tennessee (4–1)	Arizona (5–0)	Texas A&M (5–1)	Texas A&M (6–1)	West Virginia (7–0)	Texas A&M (7–1)	Alabama (8–1–1)	Boston College (8–2)	Ohio State (9–1–1)	Ohio State (9–1–1)	Ohio State (10–1–1)	11.
12.	Washington	Washington (0–0)	Washington (1–0)	Oklahoma (2–0)	Syracuse (2–0–1)	Arizona (4–0)	Arizona (5–0)	Washington (4–1)	North Carolina (7–1)	Penn State (5–1)	UCLA (6–2)	Alabama (7–1–1)	Wisconsin (7–1–1)	Ohio State (9–1–1)	North Carolina (10–2)	North Carolina (10–2)	Tennessee (9–2–1)	12.
13.	Georgia	Arizona (0–0)	Arizona (1–0)	North Carolina (3–0)	Colorado (2–1)	Syracuse (3–0–1)	Washington (3–1)	Texas A&M (4–1)	Michigan (4–2)	West Virginia (6–0)	Louisville (7–1)	Arizona (8–1)	North Carolina (9–2)	North Carolina (9–2)	Penn State (9–2)	Penn State (9–2)	Boston College (9–3)	13.
14.	Arizona	Georgia (0–0)	North Carolina (2–0)	Penn State (2–0)	Texas A&M (2–1)	Texas A&M (2–1)	Texas A&M (3–1)	North Carolina (6–1)	Penn State (5–1)	Oklahoma (6–1)	Arizona (7–1)	Wisconsin (7–1–1)	Penn State (7–2)	Penn State (8–2)	UCLA (8–3)	UCLA (8–3)	Alabama (9–3–1)	14.
15.	Stanford (1)	Stanford (0–0) (1)	Penn State (1–0)	Arizona (2–0)	Arizona (3–0)	Washington (2–1)	North Carolina (5–1)	Virginia (5–0)	Wisconsin (6–0)	UCLA (5–2)	Wisconsin (7–1)	North Carolina (8–2)	Oklahoma (8–2)	UCLA (8–3)	Boston College (8–3)	Boston College (8–3)	Miami (FL) (9–3)	15.
16.	Penn State	North Carolina (1–0)	Ohio State (1–0)	Texas A&M (1–1)	Washington (1–1)	North Carolina (4–1)	California (5–0)	Wisconsin (5–0)	Colorado (4–2)	Virginia (6–1)	North Carolina (7–2)	Penn State (6–2)	UCLA (7–3)	Oklahoma (8–2)	Alabama (8–2–1)	Arizona (9–2)	Colorado (8–3–1)	16.
17.	Ohio State	Penn State (0–0)	Oklahoma (1–0)	NC State (2–0)	Stanford (2–1)	California (4–0)	Louisville (5–0)	West Virginia (5–0)	Oklahoma (5–1)	Louisville (7–1)	Indiana (7–1)	Oklahoma (7–2)	Boston College (7–2)	Alabama (8–2–1)	Arizona (9–2)	Colorado (7–3–1)	Oklahoma (9–3)	17.
18.	USC	Ohio State (0–0)	NC State (1–0)	Washington (1–1)	North Carolina (3–1)	Louisville (4–0)	Virginia (5–0)	Michigan (3–2)	West Virginia (5–0)	North Carolina (7–2)	Kansas State (6–1–1)	Virginia (7–2)	Colorado (6–3–1)	Colorado (7–3–1)	Colorado (7–3–1)	Alabama (8–3–1)	UCLA (8–4)	18.
19.	BYU	BYU (0–0)	South Carolina (1–0)	BYU (2–0)	NC State (2–0)	Colorado (2–2)	BYU (4–0)	Auburn (6–0)	UCLA (4–2)	Washington (5–2)	Penn State (5–2)	Indiana (7–2)	Arizona (8–2)	Arizona (8–2)	Oklahoma (8–3)	Oklahoma (8–3)	North Carolina (10–3)	19.
20.	North Carolina	Boston College (0–0)	BYU (1–0)	Stanford (1–1)	California (3–0)	BYU (4–0)	Colorado (2–2)	Colorado (3–2)	Louisville (6–1)	Colorado (4–2–1)	Oklahoma (6–2)	Louisville (7–2)	Kansas State (7–2–1)	Kansas State (8–2–1)	Kansas State (8–2–1)	Kansas State (8–2–1)	Kansas State (9–2–1)	20.
21.	Boston College	Oklahoma (0–0)	Clemson (1–0)	California (2–0)	BYU (3–0)	Virginia (4–0)	Wisconsin (4–0)	California (5–1)	Virginia (5–1)	Wisconsin (6–1)	Virginia (6–2)	Colorado (5–3–1)	Indiana (7–3)	Indiana (8–3)	Indiana (8–3)	Indiana (8–3)	Michigan (8–4)	21.
22.	Oklahoma	Clemson (0–0)	Georgia (0–1)	Boston College (0–1)	Virginia (3–0)	Wisconsin (4–0)	Auburn (5–0)	UCLA (3–2)	Washington (4–2)	Michigan State (4–2)	NC State (6–2)	Boston College (6–2)	USC (7–4)	Virginia Tech (8–3)	Virginia Tech (8–3)	Virginia Tech (8–3)	Virginia Tech (9–3)	22.
23.	Clemson	Mississippi State (0–0)	Stanford (0–1)	Arizona State (1–0)	Wisconsin (3–0)	Auburn (4–0)	Syracuse (3–1–1)	Louisville (5–1)	Syracuse (4–1–1)	Indiana (6–1)	Colorado (4–3–1)	Wyoming (7–1)	Virginia (7–3)	Michigan (7–4)	Michigan (7–4)	Michigan (7–4)	Clemson (9–3)	23.
24.	Mississippi State	NC State (0–0)	Baylor (1–0)	Wisconsin (2–0)	Louisville (3–0)	NC State (2–1)	West Virginia (4–0)	Syracuse (3–1–1)	Michigan State (3–2)	Michigan (4–3)	Wyoming (7–1)	Kansas State (6–2–1)	Clemson (7–3)	Clemson (8–3)	Clemson (8–3)	Clemson (8–3)	Louisville (9–3)	24.
25.	NC State	Fresno State (0–0)	Boston College (0–1)	Virginia (2–0)	Auburn (3–0)	West Virginia (3–0)	UCLA (2–2)	Michigan State (3–1)	Washington State (5–2)	Kansas State (5–1–1)	Virginia Tech (6–2)	Washington (6–3)	Virginia Tech (7–3)	Michigan State (6–3)	Michigan State (6–4)	Fresno State (8–3) т; Louisville (8–3) т	California (9–4)	25.
	Preseason Aug 24	Week 1 Aug 31	Week 2 Sep 7	Week 3 Sep 14	Week 4 Sep 21	Week 5 Sep 28	Week 6 Oct 5	Week 7 Oct 12	Week 8 Oct 19	Week 9 Oct 26	Week 10 Nov 2	Week 11 Nov 9	Week 12 Nov 16	Week 13 Nov 23	Week 14 Nov 30	Week 15 Dec 7	Week 16 (Final) Jan 3	
		Dropped: USC	Dropped: Fresno State; Mississippi State	Dropped: Baylor; Clemson; Georgia; South Carolina	Dropped: Boston College; Arizona State	Dropped: Stanford	Dropped: NC State	Dropped: BYU	Dropped: California	Dropped: Syracuse; Washington State	Dropped: Michigan; Michigan State; Washington	Dropped: NC State; Virginia Tech	Dropped: Louisville; Wyoming; Washington	Dropped: USC; Virginia	None	Dropped: Michigan State	Dropped: Indiana; Fresno State	

== Coaches Poll ==
	Preseason Aug 20	Week 1 Aug 30	Week 2 Sep 7	Week 3 Sep 13	Week 4 Sep 20	Week 5 Sep 27	Week 6 Oct 4	Week 7 Oct 11	Week 8 Oct 18	Week 9 Oct 25	Week 10 Nov 1	Week 11 Nov 8	Week 12 Nov 15	Week 13 Nov 22	Week 14 Nov 29	Week 15 Dec 6	Week 16 (Final) Jan 3	
1.	Florida State (47)	Florida State (1–0) (54)	Florida State (2–0) (56)	Florida State (3–0) (59)	Florida State (4–0) (59)	Florida State (4–0) (58)	Florida State (5–0) (57)	Florida State (6–0) (58)	Florida State (7–0) (59)	Florida State (7–0) (59)	Florida State (8–0) (59)	Florida State (9–0) (60)	Notre Dame (10–0) (60)	Nebraska (10–0) (43)	Nebraska (11–0) (43)	Nebraska (11–0) (41)	Florida State (12–1) (36)	1.
2.	Alabama (8)	Alabama (0–0) (4)	Michigan (1–0) (2)	Alabama (2–0) (1)	Alabama (3–0) (1)	Alabama (4–0) (2)	Alabama (5–0) (2)	Alabama (5–0) (2)	Notre Dame (7–0) (3)	Notre Dame (8–0) (3)	Notre Dame (9–0) (2)	Notre Dame (9–0) (2)	Nebraska (10–0) (2)	Florida State (10–1) (11)	West Virginia (11–0) (8)	West Virginia (11–0) (7)	Notre Dame (11–1) (25)	2.
3.	Michigan (5)	Michigan (0–0) (4)	Alabama (1–0) (2)	Miami (FL) (1–0) (2)	Miami (FL) (2–0) (2)	Miami (FL) (3–0) (2)	Miami (FL) (4–0) (2)	Notre Dame (6–0) (2)	Nebraska (6–0)	Ohio State (7–0)	Ohio State (8–0) (1)	Nebraska (9–0)	Florida State (9–1)	West Virginia (10–0) (7)	Florida State (11–1) (10)	Florida State (11–1) (13)	Nebraska (11–1) (1)	3.
4.	Miami (FL)	Miami (FL) (0–0)	Miami (FL) (1–0) (2)	Syracuse (2–0)	Notre Dame (3–0)	Notre Dame (4–0)	Notre Dame (4–0) (1)	Florida (5–0)	Ohio State (6–0)	Nebraska (7–0)	Nebraska (8–0)	Miami (FL) (7–1)	Miami (FL) (8–1)	Notre Dame (10–1) (1)	Notre Dame (10–1) (1)	Notre Dame (10–1) (1)	Florida (11–2)	4.
5.	Texas A&M (1)	Texas A&M (0–0)	Texas A&M (1–0)	Notre Dame (2–0)	Nebraska (3–0)	Nebraska (4–0)	Nebraska (4–0)	Nebraska (5–0)	Alabama (5–0–1)	Alabama (6–0–1)	Alabama (7–0–1)	Ohio State (8–0–1)	Ohio State (9–0–1)	Tennessee (8–1–1)	Tennessee (9–1–1)	Tennessee (9–1–1)	Wisconsin (10–1–1)	5.
6.	Notre Dame (1)	Notre Dame (0–0)	Syracuse (1–0)	Nebraska (2–0)	Florida (3–0)	Florida (3–0)	Florida (4–0)	Ohio State (5–0)	Miami (FL) (4–1)	Miami (FL) (5–1)	Miami (FL) (6–1)	Tennessee (7–1–1)	West Virginia (9–0)	Florida (9–1) т	Texas A&M (10–1)	Texas A&M (10–1)	West Virginia (11–1)	6.
7.	Syracuse	Syracuse (0–0)	Nebraska (1–0)	Tennessee (2–0)	Ohio State (3–0)	Ohio State (3–0)	Ohio State (4–0)	Penn State (5–0)	Arizona (6–0)	Arizona (7–0)	Tennessee (6–1–1)	West Virginia (8–0)	Tennessee (7–1–1)	Texas A&M (8–1) т	Wisconsin (8–1–1)	Wisconsin (9–1–1)	Penn State (10–2)	7.
8.	Nebraska	Nebraska (0–0)	Florida (1–0)	Colorado (2–0)	Penn State (3–0)	Penn State (4–0)	Penn State (5–0)	Oklahoma (5–0)	Tennessee (5–1–1)	Texas A&M (6–1)	Texas A&M (7–1)	Texas A&M (7–1)	Texas A&M (8–1)	Wisconsin (8–1–1)	Miami (FL) (9–2)	Florida (10–2)	Texas A&M (10–2)	8.
9.	Tennessee	Florida (0–0)	Colorado (1–0)	Florida (2–0)	Michigan (1–1)	Oklahoma (3–0)	Oklahoma (4–0)	Miami (FL) (4–1)	Texas A&M (5–1)	Tennessee (5–1–1)	West Virginia (7–0)	Florida (7–1)	Florida (8–1)	Miami (FL) (8–2)	Florida (9–2)	Miami (FL) (9–2)	Arizona (10–2)	9.
10.	Colorado	Colorado (0–0)	Notre Dame (1–0)	Michigan (1–1)	Oklahoma (2–0)	Michigan (2–1)	Michigan (3–1)	Arizona (5–0)	Florida (5–1)	Florida (5–1)	Florida (6–1)	UCLA (7–2)	Alabama (8–1–1)	Ohio State (9–1–1)	Ohio State (9–1–1)	Ohio State (9–1–1)	Ohio State (10–1–1)	10.
11.	Washington	Tennessee (0–0)	Tennessee (1–0)	Ohio State (2–0)	Syracuse (2–0–1)	Arizona (4–0)	Arizona (5–0)	Tennessee (5–1)	North Carolina (7–1)	West Virginia (6–0)	UCLA (6–2)	Alabama (7–1–1)	Wisconsin (7–1–1)	Penn State (8–2)	North Carolina (10–2)	North Carolina (10–2)	Tennessee (9–2–1)	11.
12.	Florida	Penn State (0–0)	Penn State (1–0)	Penn State (2–0)	Colorado (2–1)	Tennessee (3–1)	Tennessee (4–1)	Texas A&M (4–1)	Wisconsin (6–0)	Penn State (5–1)	Arizona (7–1)	Arizona (8–1)	Penn State (7–2)	Boston College (8–2)	Penn State (9–2)	Penn State (9–2)	Boston College (9–3)	12.
13.	Georgia	Georgia (0–0)	Arizona (1–0)	Oklahoma (2–0)	Tennessee (2–1)	Syracuse (3–0–1)	Texas A&M (3–1)	North Carolina (6–1)	Penn State (5–1)	Oklahoma (6–1)	Indiana (7–1)	Wisconsin (7–1–1)	North Carolina (9–2)	North Carolina (9–2)	UCLA (8–3)	UCLA (8–3)	Alabama (9–3–1)	13.
14.	Penn State	Stanford (0–0)	Ohio State (1–0)	North Carolina (3–0)	Arizona (3–0)	Texas A&M (2–1)	California (5–0)	Virginia (5–0)	Michigan (4–2)	Virginia (6–1)	Wisconsin (7–1)	Penn State (6–2)	Oklahoma (8–2)	UCLA (8–3)	Arizona (9–2)	Arizona (9–2)	Oklahoma (9–3)	14.
15.	Stanford	Arizona (0–0)	North Carolina (2–0)	Arizona (2–0)	Texas A&M (2–1)	California (4–0)	North Carolina (5–1)	West Virginia (5–0)	West Virginia (5–0)	UCLA (5–2)	Louisville (7–1)	North Carolina (8–2)	UCLA (7–3)	Oklahoma (8–2)	Alabama (8–2–1)	Boston College (8–3)	Miami (FL) (9–3)	15.
16.	Arizona	Ohio State (0–0)	Oklahoma (1–0)	Texas A&M (1–1)	NC State (2–0)	North Carolina (4–1)	Virginia (5-00	Wisconsin (5–0)	Colorado (4–2)	Louisville (7–1)	Penn State (5–2)	Virginia (7–2)	Boston College (7–2)	Arizona (8–2)	Boston College (8–3)	Oklahoma (8–3)	Colorado (8–3–1)	16.
17.	Ohio State	USC (0–0)	Clemson (1–0) т	NC State (2–0)	BYU (3–0)	BYU (4–0)	Louisville (5–0)	Michigan (3–2)	Oklahoma (5–1)	Indiana (6–1)	Kansas State (6–1–1)	Oklahoma (7–2)	Arizona (8–2)	Alabama (8–2–1)	Oklahoma (8–3)	Colorado (7–3–1)	UCLA (8–4)	17.
18.	USC	North Carolina (0–0)	NC State (1–0) т	BYU (2–0)	California (3–0)	Virginia (4–0)	BYU (4–0)	Colorado (3–2)	UCLA (4–2)	Colorado (4–2–1)	North Carolina (7–2)	Indiana (7–2)	Colorado (6–3–1)	Colorado (7–3–1)	Colorado (7–3–1)	Alabama (8–3–1)	Kansas State (9–2–1)	18.
19.	North Carolina	Oklahoma (0–0)	BYU (1–0)	Stanford (1–1)	North Carolina (3–1)	Louisville (4–0)	Wisconsin (4–0)	Syracuse (3–1–1)	Louisville (6–1)	North Carolina (7–2)	Virginia (6–2)	Wyoming (7–1)	USC (7–4)	Kansas State (8–2–1)	Kansas State (8–2–1)	Kansas State (8–2–1)	Michigan (8–4)	19.
20.	Clemson	BYU (0–0)	South Carolina (1–0)	Arizona State (1–0)	Stanford (2–1)	Wisconsin (4–0)	West Virginia (4–0)	California (5–1)	Virginia (5–1)	Wisconsin (6–1)	Oklahoma (6–2)	Louisville (7–2)	Kansas State (7–2–1)	Virginia Tech (8–3)	Virginia Tech (8–3)	Indiana (8–3)	Virginia Tech (9–3)	20.
21.	Oklahoma	Clemson (0–0)	Georgia (0–1)	California (2–0)	Virginia (3–0)	Colorado (2–2)	Colorado (2–2)	Louisville (5–1)	Syracuse (4–1–1)	Michigan State (4–2)	Wyoming (7–1)	Boston College (6–2)	Indiana (7–3)	Indiana (8–3)	Indiana (8–3)	Virginia Tech (8–3)	North Carolina (10–3)	21.
22.	BYU	NC State (0–0)	Stanford (0–1)	Iowa (2–0)	Wisconsin (3–0)	West Virginia (3–0)	Syracuse (3–1–1)	Indiana (5–1)	Indiana (5–1)	Kansas State (5–1–1)	NC State (6–2)	Colorado (5–3–1)	Virginia (7–3)	Michigan (7–4)	Michigan (7–4)	Michigan (7–4)	Clemson (9–3)	22.
23.	NC State	Boston College (0–0)	USC (1–1)	Virginia (2–0)	Louisville (3–0)	NC State (2–1)	Fresno State (3–1)	UCLA (3–2)	Michigan State (3–2)	Michigan (4–3)	Virginia Tech (6–2)	Kansas State (6–2–1)	Virginia Tech (7–3)	Clemson (8–3)	Clemson (8–3)	Clemson (8–3)	Louisville (9–3)	23.
24.	Boston College	Texas (0–0)	Arizona State (1–0)	Boston College (0–1)	West Virginia (2–0)	Fresno State (3–1)	Clemson (3–1)	Kansas State (5–0)	Washington State (5–2)	Virginia Tech (5–2)	Colorado (4–3–1)	USC (6–4)	Michigan State (6–3)	Michigan State (6–3)	Fresno State (8–3)	Fresno State (8–3)	California (9–4)	24.
25.	Mississippi State	Mississippi State (0–0)	Baylor (1–0)	Wisconsin (2–0)	Fresno State (2–1)	Ole Miss (3–1)	Indiana (4–1)	Michigan State (3–1)	Kansas State (5–1)	Wyoming (6–1)	Boston College (5–2)	Michigan State (5–3)	Clemson (7–3)	USC (7–5)	Louisville (8–3)	Louisville (8–3)	USC (8–5)	25.
	Preseason Aug 20	Week 1 Aug 30	Week 2 Sep 7	Week 3 Sep 13	Week 4 Sep 20	Week 5 Sep 27	Week 6 Oct 4	Week 7 Oct 11	Week 8 Oct 18	Week 9 Oct 25	Week 10 Nov 1	Week 11 Nov 8	Week 12 Nov 15	Week 13 Nov 22	Week 14 Nov 29	Week 15 Dec 6	Week 16 (Final) Jan 3	
		Dropped: Washington	Dropped: Boston College; Texas; Mississippi State	Dropped: Clemson; South Carolina; Georgia; USC; Baylor	Dropped: Arizona State; Iowa; Boston College	Dropped: Stanford	Dropped: NC State; Ole Miss	Dropped: BYU; Fresno State; Clemson	Dropped: California	Dropped: Syracuse; Washington State	Dropped: Michigan State; Michigan	Dropped: NC State; Virginia Tech	Dropped: Wyoming; Louisville	Dropped: Virginia	Dropped: Michigan State; USC	None	Dropped: Indiana; Fresno State	

Auburn was ineligible to be ranked in the Coaches' Poll due to NCAA probation. Washington became ineligible after August 22.
