= Tulsa Golden Hurricane football statistical leaders =

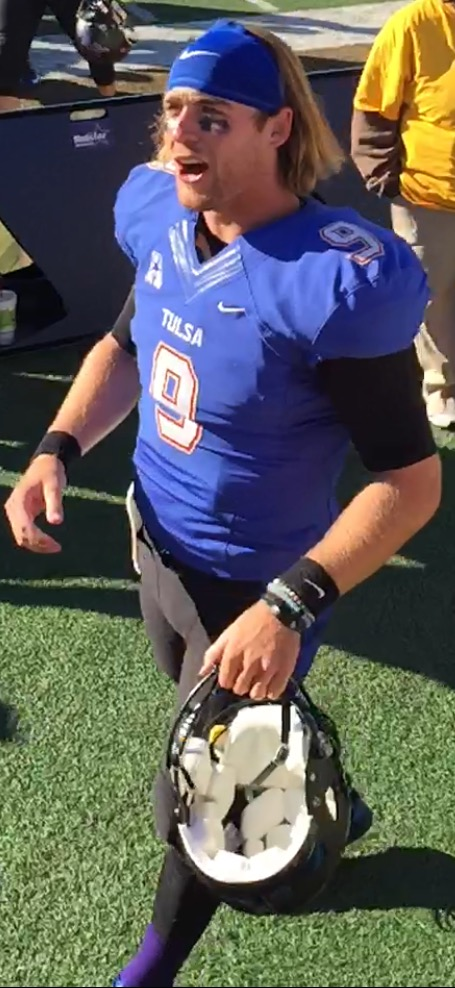
Dane Evans is Tulsa's career leader in passing yards and touchdowns.

The following lists give individual statistical leaders of the Tulsa Golden Hurricane football program in various categories, including passing, rushing, receiving, total offense, defensive stats, and kicking. Within those areas, the lists identify single-game, single-season, and career leaders. The Golden Hurricane represent the University of Tulsa in the NCAA Division I FBS American Conference.

Although Tulsa began competing in intercollegiate football in 1895, the school's official record book considers the "modern era" to have begun in 1941. Records from before this year are often incomplete and inconsistent, and they are generally not included in these lists.

These lists are dominated by more recent players for several reasons:

- Since 1941, seasons have increased from 10 games to 11 and then 12 games in length.
- The NCAA didn't allow freshmen to play varsity football until 1972 (with the exception of the World War II years), allowing players to have four-year careers.
- Bowl games only began counting toward single-season and career statistics in 2002. The Golden Hurricane have played in 10 bowl games since this decision, giving many recent players an extra game to accumulate statistics.

However, the passing and receiving lists also see many entries during the 1961–1968 tenure of head coach Glenn Dobbs, whose teams led the NCAA in passing yards five times in an era before today's modern spread offenses.

These lists are updated through the end of the 2025 season. Note that the Tulsa official record book does not include any information for some of these statistics.

== Passing ==
=== Passing yards ===
Career
Rk	Player	Yards	Years
1	Dane Evans	11,680	2013 2014 2015 2016
2	Paul Smith	10,936	2003 2005 2006 2007
3	G. J. Kinne	9,472	2009 2010 2011
4	T. J. Rubley	9,324	1987 1988 1989 1990 1991
5	John Fitzgerald	5,822	1994 1996 1997 1998
6	Davis Brin	5,660	2018 2019 2020 2021 2022
7	Gus Frerotte	5,480	1990 1991 1992 1993
8	Josh Blankenship	5,273	1999 2000 2001
9	Zach Smith	5,227	2019 2020
10	James Kilian	4,865	2001 2002 2003 2004

Single season
Rk	Player	Yards	Year
1	Paul Smith	5,065	2007
2	Dane Evans	4,332	2015
3	David Johnson	4,059	2008
4	G. J. Kinne	3,650	2010
5	Billy Guy Anderson	3,464	1965
6	Dane Evans	3,348	2016
7	Zach Smith	3,279	2019
8	Davis Brin	3,254	2021
9	Dane Evans	3,102	2014
10	G. J. Kinne	3,090	2011

Single game
Rk	Player	Yards	Year	Opponent
1	Billy Guy Anderson	502	1965	Colorado State
2	Jerry Rhome	488	1964	Oklahoma State
3	Billy Guy Anderson	477	1965	Southern Illinois
	Billy Guy Anderson	477	1965	Memphis
5	David Johnson	469	2008	New Mexico
6	Davis Brin	460	2022	Wyoming
7	Paul Smith	454	2007	BYU
8	Billy Guy Anderson	451	1965	Cincinnati
9	Paul Smith	441	2007	Rice
10	Dane Evans	438	2014	Tulane

=== Passing touchdowns ===
Career
Rk	Player	TDs	Years
1	Dane Evans	84	2013 2014 2015 2016
2	Paul Smith	83	2003 2005 2006 2007
3	G. J. Kinne	81	2009 2010 2011
4	T. J. Rubley	73	1987 1988 1989 1990 1991
5	David Johnson	48	2005 2006 2007 2008
6	Jerry Rhome	42	1963 1964
7	Davis Brin	37	2018 2020 2021 2022
8	James Kilian	36	2001 2002 2003 2004
9	Jeb Blount	35	1973 1974 1975
10	Ronnie Morris	32	1950 1951 1952
	Gus Frerotte	32	1990 1991 1992 1993
	Zach Smith	32	2019 2020

Single season
Rk	Player	TDs	Year
1	Paul Smith	47	2007
2	David Johnson	46	2008
3	Jerry Rhome	32	1964
	Dane Evans	32	2016
5	G. J. Kinne	31	2010
6	Billy Guy Anderson	30	1965
7	G. J. Kinne	28	2011
8	Dane Evans	25	2015
9	Dane Evans	23	2014
10	T. J. Rubley	22	1989
	G. J. Kinne	22	2009

Single game
Rk	Player	TDs	Year	Opponent
1	Jerry Rhome	7	1964	Louisville

== Rushing ==
=== Rushing yards ===
Career
Rk	Player	Yards	Years
1	D'Angelo Brewer	3,917	2014 2015 2016 2017
2	Shamari Brooks	3,729	2017 2018 2019 2021
3	Tarrion Adams	3,651	2005 2006 2007 2008
4	Mike Gunter	3,536	1980 1981 1982 1983
5	Trey Watts	3,515	2010 2011 2012 2013
6	Eric Richardson	2,645	2000 2001 2002 2003
7	Howard Waugh	2,597	1950 1951 1952
8	Solomon White	2,553	1993 1994 1995 1996
9	Ja’Terian Douglas	2,533	2010 2011 2012 2013
10	Uril Parrish	2,465	2002 2003 2004 2005

Single season
Rk	Player	Yards	Year
1	James Flanders	1,629	2016
2	Tarrion Adams	1,523	2008
3	D'Angelo Brewer	1,517	2017
4	Mike Gunter	1,464	1982
5	D'Angelo Brewer	1,435	2016
6	Howard Waugh	1,372	1952
7	Trey Watts	1,329	2013
8	Chris Hughley	1,326	1991
9	Tarrion Adams	1,225	2007
10	Gordon Brown	1,201	1985

Single game
Rk	Player	Yards	Year	Opponent
1	Tarrion Adams	323	2008	Tulane
2	Mark Brus	312	1990	New Mexico State
3	Solomon White	265	1994	UNLV
4	D'Angelo Brewer	262	2017	Louisiana
5	D'Angelo Brewer	255	2017	Temple
6	D'Angelo Brewer	252	2016	Fresno State
7	Howard Waugh	250	1952	Arkansas
8	James Flanders	249	2016	Memphis
9	Mike Gunter	240	1982	Air Force
10	Chris Hughley	231	1991	Texas A&M
	Deneric Prince	231	2022	Temple

=== Rushing touchdowns ===
Career
Rk	Player	TDs	Years
1	Alex Singleton	43	2009 2010 2011 2012
2	Mike Gunter	32	1980 1981 1982 1983
	Tarrion Adams	32	2005 2006 2007 2008
4	Steve Gage	30	1983 1984 1985 1986
	Shamari Brooks	30	2017 2018 2019 2021
6	Paul Smith	28	2003 2005 2006 2007
7	Eric Richardson	26	2000 2001 2002 2003
	Corey Taylor II	26	2016 2017 2018 2019 2020
9	Solomon White	25	1993 1994 1995 1996
	Ken Bohanon	25	1998 1999 2000 2001
	Uril Parrish	25	2002 2003 2004 2005

Single season
Rk	Player	TDs	Year
1	Alex Singleton	24	2012
2	Zack Langer	18	2015
	James Flanders	18	2016
4	Steve Gage	17	1985
5	Mike Gunter	14	1983
	Courtney Tennial	14	2006
	Tarrion Adams	14	2008
8	Paul Smith	13	2007
9	Ken Lacy	12	1982
	Eric Richardson	12	2003

== Receiving ==
=== Receptions ===
Career
Rk	Player	Rec	Years
1	Howard Twilley	261	1963 1964 1965
2	Keylon Stokes	242	2017 2018 2019 2020 2021 2022
3	Keevan Lucas	240	2013 2014 2015 2016
4	Keyarris Garrett	219	2011 2012 2013 2014
5	Damon Savage	212	1996 1997 1998 1999
6	Josh Atkinson	202	2012 2013 2014 2015 2016
7	Garrett Mills	201	2002 2003 2004 2005
8	Wes Caswell	196	1993 1994 1996 1997
9	Charles Clay	189	2007 2008 2009 2010
10	Damaris Johnson	188	2008 2009 2010

Single season
Rk	Player	Rec	Year
1	Howard Twilley	134	1965
2	Chris Penn	105	1993
3	Keevan Lucas	101	2014
4	Keyarris Garrett	96	2015
5	Howard Twilley	95	1964
6	Garrett Mills	87	2005
7	Josh Johnson	83	2021
8	Keevan Lucas	81	2016
9	Donald Shoals	80	2000
10	Rick Eber	78	1967
	Damaris Johnson	78	2009
	Josh Atkinson	78	2016

Single game
Rk	Player	Rec	Year	Opponent
1	Rick Eber	20	1967	Idaho State
2	Howard Twilley	19	1965	Colorado State
3	Howard Twilley	18	1965	Southern Illinois
4	Damaris Johnson	17	2009	Southern Miss
5	Howard Twilley	16	1965	Memphis
	Chris Penn	16	1993	East Carolina
7	Howard Twilley	15	1964	Oklahoma State
	Howard Twilley	15	1965	Louisville

=== Receiving yards ===
Career
Rk	Player	Yards	Years
1	Keylon Stokes	3,774	2017 2018 2019 2020 2021 2022
2	Howard Twilley	3,343	1963 1964 1965
3	Dan Bitson	3,300	1987 1988 1989 1991
4	Keevan Lucas	3,250	2013 2014 2015 2016
5	Keyarris Garrett	3,209	2011 2012 2013 2014 2015
6	Damon Savage	2,952	1996 1997 1998 1999
7	Damaris Johnson	2,746	2008 2009 2010
8	Josh Atkinson	2,654	2012 2013 2014 2015 2016
9	Wes Caswell	2,562	1993 1994 1996 1997 1998
10	Justin Hobbs	2,546	2014 2015 2016 2017 2018

Single season
Rk	Player	Yards	Year
1	Howard Twilley	1,779	1965
2	Keyarris Garrett	1,588	2015
3	Chris Penn	1,578	1993
4	Dan Bitson	1,425	1989
5	Brennan Marion	1,244	2007
6	Garrett Mills	1,235	2005
7	Keylon Stokes	1,224	2022
8	Keevan Lucas	1,219	2014
9	Donald Shoals	1,195	2000
10	Keevan Lucas	1,180	2016

Single game
Rk	Player	Yards	Year	Opponent
1	Rick Eber	322	1967	Idaho State
2	Harry Wood	318	1967	Idaho State
3	Donald Shoals	271	2000	New Mexico State
4	Keyarris Garrett	268	2015	Memphis
5	Howard Twilley	267	1965	Memphis State
6	Chris Penn	259	1993	East Carolina
7	Brennan Marion	244	2007	Rice
8	Howard Twilley	242	1965	Southern Illinois
9	Dan Bitson	238	1989	Bowling Green
10	Dan Bitson	237	1988	Colorado State

=== Receiving touchdowns ===
Career
Rk	Player	TDs	Years
1	Howard Twilley	32	1963 1964 1965
	Steve Largent	32	1973 1974 1975
	Keevan Lucas	32	2013 2014 2015 2016
4	Dan Bitson	29	1987 1988 1989 1991
5	Charles Clay	28	2007 2008 2009 2010
6	Trae Johnson	27	2007 2008 2009 2010
7	Garrett Mills	23	2002 2003 2004 2005
8	Keyarris Garrett	22	2011 2012 2013 2014 2015
9	Harry Wood	20	1966 1967 1968
10	Brennan Marion	19	2007 2008
	Keylon Stokes	19	2017 2018 2019 2020 2021 2022

Single season
Rk	Player	TDs	Year
1	Howard Twilley	16	1965
2	Dan Bitson	16	1989
3	Keevan Lucas	15	2016
4	Howard Twilley	13	1964
	Trae Johnson	13	2007
6	Chris Penn	12	1993
7	Brennan Marion	11	2007
	Keevan Lucas	11	2014
9	Rick Eber	10	1967

Single game
Rk	Player	TDs	Year	Opponent
1	Howard Twilley	5	1965	Louisville
	Steve Largent	5	1974	Drake

== Total offense ==
Total offense is the sum of passing and rushing statistics. It does not include receiving or returns.

=== Total offense yards ===
Career
Rk	Player	Yards	Years
1	Dane Evans	11,752	2013 2014 2015 2016
2	Paul Smith	11,602	2003 2005 2006 2007
3	G. J. Kinne	10,831	2009 2010 2011
4	T. J. Rubley	9,080	1987 1988 1989 1990 1991
5	John Fitzgerald	6,258	1994 1996 1997 1998
6	James Kilian	5,948	2001 2002 2003 2004
7	Davis Brin	5,669	2018 2020 2021 2022
8	Gus Frerotte	5,553	1990 1991 1992 1993
9	Steve Gage	5,450	1983 1984 1985 1986
10	Josh Blankenship	5,267	1999 2000 2001

Single season
Rk	Player	Yards	Year
1	Paul Smith	5,184	2007
2	Dane Evans	4,323	2015
3	David Johnson	4,245	2008
4	G. J. Kinne	4,211	2010
5	G. J. Kinne	3,495	2011
6	Billy Guy Anderson	3,343	1965
7	Davis Brin	3,329	2021
8	Dane Evans	3,319	2016
9	Zach Smith	3,183	2019
10	Dane Evans	3,160	2014

=== Total touchdowns ===
Career
Rk	Player	TDs	Years
1	Paul Smith	111	2003 2005 2006 2007
2	G. J. Kinne	96	2009 2010 2011
3	Dane Evans	94	2013 2014 2015 2016
4	T. J. Rubley	74	1987 1988 1989 1990 1991
5	James Kilian	55	2001 2002 2003 2004
6	David Johnson	52	2005 2006 2007 2008
7	Jerry Rhome	52	1963 1964
8	Steve Gage	49	1983 1984 1985 1986
9	Alex Singleton	43	2009 2010 2011 2012
10	Davis Brin	41	2018 2020 2021 2022

Single season
Rk	Player	TDs	Year
1	Paul Smith	60	2007
2	David Johnson	49	2008
3	Jerry Rhome	40	1964
4	G. J. Kinne	38	2010
5	Dane Evans	36	2016
6	Billy Guy Anderson	35	1965
7	G. J. Kinne	31	2011
8	G. J. Kinne	27	2009
	Dane Evans	27	2015
10	Paul Smith	26	2005
	Dane Evans	26	2014

== Defense ==
=== Interceptions ===
Career
Rk	Player	Ints	Years
1	Dexter McCoil	18	2009 2010 2011 2012
2	Jeff Jordan	13	1962 1963 1964
	Nate Harris	13	1981 1982 1983 1984

Single season
Rk	Player	Ints	Year
1	Nate Harris	8	1984

=== Tackles ===
Career
Rk	Player	Tackles	Years
1	Nelson Coleman	413	2004 2005 2006 2007
2	Michael Mudoh	406	2012 2013 2014 2015
3	Shawn Jackson	401	2010 2011 2012 2013
4	Michael White	389	1987 1989 1990 1991
5	Robert Tennon	388	1976 1978 1979 1980
6	Lovie Smith	367	1976 1977 1978 1979
7	Curnelius Arnick	356	2008 2009 2010 2011
8	Kendarin Ray	353	2019 2020 2021 2022 2023
9	Chris Chamberlain	352	2004 2005 2006 2007
10	Cooper Edmiston	343	2016 2017 2018 2019

Single season
Rk	Player	Tackles	Year
1	Chris Chamberlain	165	2007
2	Curnelius Arnick	159	2011
3	Levi Gullen	148	1997
4	Robert Tennon	140	1979
5	Nelson Coleman	139	2007
6	Steve Nicholson	135	1977
	Michael Mudoh	135	2015
8	Michael Mudoh	133	2013
9	Michael White	132	1991
10	Rich Young	131	1997
	Kendarin Ray	131	2023

=== Sacks ===
Career
Rk	Player	Sacks	Years
1	Shawn Jackson	23.5	2010 2011 2012 2013
2	Dennis Byrd	20.0	1985 1986 1987 1988
	Sedric Clark	20.0	1992 1993 1994 1995

Single season
Rk	Player	Sacks	Year
1	Salifu Abudulai	12.0	1996
2	Jared St. John	11.5	2012
3	Dennis Byrd	11.0	1988
4	Sedric Clark	10.0	1995
5	Alain Karatapeyan	9.0	2007
	DeAundre Brown	9.0	2012
7	James Lockett	8.5	2008
	Shawn Jackson	8.5	2010
	Ben Kopenski	8.5	2023
10	Sedric Clark	8.0	1994
	Tyrunn Walker	8.0	2011
	Trevis Gipson	8.0	2019

== Kicking ==
=== Field goals made ===
Career
Rk	Player	FGs	Years
1	Jason Staurovsky	53	1981 1983 1984 1985
2	David Fuess	51	1986 1987 1988 1989
	Zack Long	51	2019 2020 2021 2022
4	James Anderson	50	1994 1995 1996 1997
	Redford Jones	50	2014 2015 2016 2017
6	Stu Crum	49	1978 1979 1980 1982
7	Brad DeVault	46	2002 2003 2004 2005
8	Kevin Fitzpatrick	45	2008 2009 2010 2011
9	Eric Lange	35	1991 1992
10	Jarod Tracy	28	2004 2006 2007 2008
	Carl Salazar	28	2013 2014

Single season
Rk	Player	FGs	Year
1	Zack Long	22	2021
2	Stu Crum	21	1982
	Redford Jones	21	2016

Single game
Rk	Player	FGs	Year	Opponent
1	David Fuess	5	1989	Iowa
