= List of Tulsa Golden Hurricane in the NFL draft =

This is a list of Tulsa Golden Hurricane football players in the NFL draft.

== Key ==
B	Back	K	Kicker	NT	Nose tackle
C	Center	LB	Linebacker	FB	Fullback
DB	Defensive back	P	Punter	HB	Halfback
DE	Defensive end	QB	Quarterback	WR	Wide receiver
DT	Defensive tackle	RB	Running back	G	Guard
E	End	T	Offensive tackle	TE	Tight end

== Selections ==
Year	Round	Pick	Player	Team	Position
1936	7	59	Tack Dennis	Chicago Cardinals	B
1937	5	43	Harn Harmon	Chicago Cardinals	C
1937	8	79	Les Chapman	Green Bay Packers	T
1939	19	174	Morris White	Philadelphia Eagles	B
1940	11	100	John McKibben	New York Giants	E
1940	15	140	Otherl Turner	New York Giants	T
1941	9	80	Bill Grimmett	Washington Redskins	E
1941	22	200	Lee Gentry	Washington Redskins	B
1942	6	41	Charley Greene	Pittsburgh Steelers	T
1942	13	111	Wayne Holt	Pittsburgh Steelers	G
1942	16	142	Glenn Henicle	Cleveland Rams	G
1943	1	3	Glenn Dobbs	Chicago Cardinals	B
1943	16	146	N. A. Keithley	New York Giants	B
1943	25	233	Cal Purdin	Chicago Cardinals	B
1943	26	246	Maurice Hall	New York Giants	G
1944	3	17	Saxon Judd	Chicago Cardinals	E
1944	6	51	C. B. Stanley	Chicago Bears	T
1944	11	107	Carl Buda	Pittsburgh Steelers	G
1944	12	113	Sam Gray	Pittsburgh Steelers	E
1944	13	121	Bobby Dobbs	Chicago Cardinals	B
1944	16	162	John Green	Philadelphia Eagles	E
1944	28	293	Charlie Mitchell	Chicago Bears	B
1945	3	27	Clyde Goodnight	Green Bay Packers	E
1945	5	34	Al Kowalski	Brooklyn Dodgers	QB
1945	7	60	Glen Burgeis	Chicago Bears	T
1945	8	69	Ellis Jones	New York Yanks	G
1945	8	76	Toby Collins	Green Bay Packers	T
1945	19	194	Clyde LeForce	Detroit Lions	B
1945	25	263	Nolan Luhn	Green Bay Packers	E
1945	27	280	Dell Taylor	Detroit Lions	B
1946	6	48	Felto Prewitt	Philadelphia Eagles	C
1946	14	128	Homer Paine	Philadelphia Eagles	T
1946	17	157	Allen Smith	Philadelphia Eagles	B
1946	25	231	Tom Worthingon	Chicago Cardinals	T
1946	25	233	Bob Verkins	Pittsburgh Steelers	B
1946	26	245	Barney White	New York Giants	E
1947	5	34	Nelson Greene	New York Giants	T
1947	12	102	Jerry D'Arcy	Philadelphia Eagles	C
1947	12	104	Hardy Brown	New York Giants	B
1947	13	112	Harden Cooper	Chicago Cardinals	T
1947	23	212	Joe Haynes	Philadelphia Eagles	G
1948	22	203	J. R. Boone	Chicago Bears	B
1948	28	261	Don Sharp	Green Bay Packers	C
1948	30	282	A. B. Kitchen	Philadelphia Eagles	T
1949	12	116	Jim Finks	Pittsburgh Steelers	QB
1949	13	127	Paul Barry	Los Angeles Rams	B
1949	24	234	Jimmy Ford	Green Bay Packers	B
1950	8	104	Russ Frizzell	Cleveland Browns	T
1951	20	243	Jack Crocher	Cleveland Browns	B
1951	21	245	Hardy Brown	San Francisco 49ers	B
1951	22	259	S. J. Whitman	Chicago Cardinals	B
1951	29	345	Fred Smith	Pittsburgh Steelers	E
1952	6	70	Jim Beasley	San Francisco 49ers	C
1952	12	145	Jake Roberts	Los Angeles Rams	B
1952	14	161	Bob Stringer	Philadelphia Eagles	B
1953	3	29	Marv Matuszak	Pittsburgh Steelers	T
1953	4	48	Willie Roberts	Los Angeles Rams	E
1953	6	72	Howard Waugh	Los Angeles Rams	B
1953	8	86	Jim Prewett	Indianapolis Colts	T
1953	9	103	Floyd Harrawood	Green Bay Packers	T
1953	12	134	Kaye Vaughn	Indianapolis Colts	G
1953	13	148	Ronnie Morris	Chicago Cardinals	B
1953	15	175	Gene Helwig	Green Bay Packers	B
1954	3	31	Tom Miner	Pittsburgh Steelers	E
1954	6	73	Dick Kercher	Detroit Lions	B
1954	9	107	Ted Connolly	San Francisco 49ers	G
1954	10	117	Ed Hughes	Los Angeles Rams	B
1957	11	127	Dick Hughes	Pittsburgh Steelers	B
1957	19	229	Ron Morris	New York Giants	B
1959	18	216	Opie Bandy	Baltimore Colts	T
1961	19	259	Joe Novseek	Baltimore Colts	T
1963	3	42	Tony Liscio	Green Bay Packers	T
1963	6	76	John Simmons	Green Bay Packers	E
1963	17	232	Ken Reed	San Francisco 49ers	G
1964	8	99	Bob Daugherty	San Francisco 49ers	B
1964	13	172	Jerry Rhome	Dallas Cowboys	QB
1964	15	200	Bill Van Burkleo	Dallas Cowboys	B
1965	2	21	Bob Breitenstein	Washington Redskins	T
1965	8	107	Jeff Jordon	Minnesota Vikings	B
1965	14	187	Garry Porterfield	Dallas Cowboys	WR
1965	16	218	Charlie Brown	Los Angeles Rams	T
1965	19	261	Billy Anderson	Los Angeles Rams	QB
1966	2	22	Willie Townes	Dallas Cowboys	T
1966	3	34	Dick Tyson	Los Angeles Rams	G
1966	10	144	John Osmond	Philadelphia Eagles	C
1966	14	209	Howard Twilley	Minnesota Vikings	WR
1966	20	292	Bud Harrington	Los Angeles Rams	RB
1967	6	135	Don Bandy	Washington Redskins	T
1967	6	139	Neal Sweeney	Denver Broncos	WR
1967	7	170	Milt Jackson	San Francisco 49ers	DB
1967	13	323	Charles Hardt	Minnesota Vikings	DB
1968	4	85	Willie Crittendon	New Orleans Saints	DT
1968	6	162	Rick Eber	Atlanta Falcons	WR
1968	8	214	Karl Henke	New York Jets	DT
1968	9	223	Joe Blake	New Orleans Saints	T
1968	9	227	Gary McDermott	Buffalo Bills	RB
1968	9	229	Greg Barton	Detroit Lions	QB
1968	13	334	Bob Joswick	Miami Dolphins	DT
1969	3	55	Al Jenkins	Cleveland Browns	G
1969	8	202	Chuck Reynolds	Cleveland Browns	C
1969	9	213	Mike Stripling	Cincinnati Bengals	RB
1969	15	370	Brant Conley	New England Patriots	RB
1970	17	426	Doug Wyatt	New Orleans Saints	DB
1971	9	209	Josh Ashton	New England Patriots	RB
1971	17	439	Ken Duncan	Minnesota Vikings	P
1972	2	28	Ralph McGill	San Francisco 49ers	DB
1972	2	44	Jean Barrett	San Francisco 49ers	T
1972	10	259	James Butler	Houston Oilers	TE
1972	16	401	James Shaw	San Diego Chargers	DB
1973	4	98	Drane Scrivener	Dallas Cowboys	DB
1973	6	149	Arthur Moore	San Francisco 49ers	DT
1973	13	321	Ed White	Denver Broncos	RB
1974	9	210	Danny Colbert	San Diego Chargers	DB
1974	10	236	Ray Rhodes	New York Giants	WR
1974	11	273	T. C. Blair	Detroit Lions	TE
1975	8	208	Al Humphrey	Pittsburgh Steelers	DE
1975	13	334	Leonard Isabell	Miami Dolphins	WR
1975	17	431	Mark Lancaster	Detroit Lions	G
1976	2	50	Jeb Blount	Oakland Raiders	QB
1976	3	85	Wes Hamilton	Minnesota Vikings	G
1976	3	89	Rick Engles	Seattle Seahawks	P
1976	4	116	Greg Fairchild	Cincinnati Bengals	G
1976	4	117	Steve Largent	Houston Oilers	WR
1976	10	274	Jessie Green	Green Bay Packers	WR
1976	13	366	Bernie Head	Miami Dolphins	C
1976	17	478	Buddy Tate	Oakland Raiders	DB
1977	1	14	Steve August	Seattle Seahawks	G
1977	8	201	Jimmy Stewart	New Orleans Saints	DB
1977	10	279	Giles Alexander	New England Patriots	DE
1977	12	329	I.V. Wilson	Seattle Seahawks	DT
1979	2	39	Rickey Watts	Chicago Bears	WR
1979	4	106	Eddie Hare	New England Patriots	P
1979	8	202	Doug Panfil	New Orleans Saints	G
1979	11	295	David Rader	San Diego Chargers	QB
1980	12	313	Quinn Jones	Atlanta Falcons	RB
1981	4	102	Don Blackmon	New England Patriots	LB
1981	8	199	Denver Johnson	Tampa Bay Buccaneers	T
1982	7	174	Eugene Williams	Seattle Seahawks	LB
1982	7	193	Bill Purifoy	Dallas Cowboys	DE
1983	5	113	Sid Abramowitz	Baltimore Colts	T
1983	12	328	Stu Crum	New York Jets	K
1984	4	107	Michael Gunter	Tampa Bay Buccaneers	RB
1984	9	234	Tom Baldwin	New York Jets	DT
1985	10	276	Albert Myres	Los Angeles Raiders	DB
1985	12	309	Dean Hamel	Washington Redskins	DT
1985	12	310	Byron Jones	Minnesota Vikings	DT
1986	12	314	Mike Williams	Pittsburgh Steelers	LB
1987	5	121	David Alexander	Philadelphia Eagles	C
1987	6	144	Steve Gage	Washington Redskins	DB
1987	6	158	Chris Pike	Philadelphia Eagles	DT
1987	10	257	Charles Wright	St. Louis Cardinals	DB
1988	11	297	Donnie Dee	Indianapolis Colts	TE
1989	2	42	Dennis Byrd	New York Jets	DE
1989	9	250	Rich Stephens	Cincinnati Bengals	T
1992	2	53	Tracy Scroggins	Detroit Lions	LB
1992	6	149	Fallon Wacasey	Dallas Cowboys	TE
1992	9	228	T. J. Rubley	Los Angeles Rams	QB
1992	10	271	Jerry Ostroski	Kansas City Chiefs	G
1993	6	168	Barry Minter	Dallas Cowboys	LB
1994	3	96	Chris Penn	Kansas City Chiefs	WR
1994	7	197	Gus Frerotte	Washington Redskins	QB
1996	7	220	Sedric Clark	Oakland Raiders	DE
1997	6	179	Muadianvita Kazadi	St. Louis Rams	LB
2000	5	145	Todd Franz	Detroit Lions	DB
2002	7	245	Kevin Shaffer	Atlanta Falcons	T
2005	7	229	James Kilian	Kansas City Chiefs	QB
2006	4	106	Garrett Mills	New England Patriots	TE
2008	7	228	Chris Chamberlain	St. Louis Rams	LB
2011	6	174	Charles Clay	Miami Dolphins	TE
2020	4	123	Reggie Robinson	Dallas Cowboys	DB
2020	5	157	Trevis Gipson	Chicago Bears	DE
2021	1	16	Zaven Collins	Arizona Cardinals	LB
2022	1	24	Tyler Smith	Dallas Cowboys	T
2022	7	230	Chris Paul	Washington Commanders	OG

== Notable undrafted players ==
Note: No drafts held before 1920

Year	Player	Position	Debut Team	Notes
1970	Rick Arrington	QB	Philadelphia Eagles	—
1972	Dick Blanchard	LB	New England Patriots	—
1977	Cornell Webster	CB	Seattle Seahawks	—
1981	Paul Johns	WR	Seattle Seahawks	—
1983	Kirk Phillips	WR	Dallas Cowboys	—
1984	Ken Lacy	RB	Kansas City Chiefs	—
1986	Gordon Brown	RB	Pittsburgh Steelers	—
1986	Jason Staurovsky	K	Buffalo Bills	—
1987	Eric Brown	WR	St. Louis Cardinals	—
1987	Tim Gordon	S	Atlanta Falcons	—
1994	Dunstan Anderson	DE	Kansas City Chiefs	—
2003	Sam Rayburn	DT	Philadelphia Eagles	—
2008	Paul Smith	QB	Jacksonville Jaguars	—
2009	Brennan Marion	WR	Miami Dolphins	—
2012	G. J. Kinne	QB	New York Jets	—
2012	Damaris Johnson	WR	Philadelphia Eagles	—
2012	Tyrunn Walker	NT	New Orleans Saints	—
2013	Dexter McCoil	DB	San Diego Chargers	—
2013	Alex Singleton	RB	Oakland Raiders	—
2014	Trey Watts	RB	St. Louis Rams	—
2016	Keyarris Garrett	WR	Carolina Panthers	—
2017	Dane Evans	QB	Philadelphia Eagles	—
2023	Deneric Prince	RB	Kansas City Chiefs	—
