= 1994 Indianapolis Colts season =

42nd season in franchise history

- Owner: Robert Irsay
- General manager: Bill Tobin
- Head coach: Ted Marchibroda
- Offensive coordinator: Nick Nicolau
- Defensive coordinator: Vince Tobin
- Home stadium: RCA Dome

Results
- Record: 8–8
- Division place: 3rd AFC East
- Playoffs: Did not qualify

The 1994 Indianapolis Colts season was the 42nd season for the team in the National Football League and 11th in Indianapolis. The Indianapolis Colts finished the National Football League's 1994 season with a record of 8 wins and 8 losses, and finished third in the AFC East division.

== Offseason ==
Additions	Subtractions
DE Tony Bennett (Packers)	QB Jeff George (Falcons)
QB Jim Harbaugh (Bears)	LB Duane Bickett (Seahawks)
QB Browning Nagle (Jets)	RB Rodney Culver (Chargers)
S David Tate (Giants)	RB Anthony Johnson (Jets)
WR Floyd Turner (Saints)	G Bill Schultz (Oilers)
	QB Jack Trudeau (Jets)
	WR Clarence Verdin (Falcons)

=== NFL draft ===
Round	Pick	Player	Position	School/Club team
1	2	Marshall Faulk	Running back	San Diego State
1	5	Trev Alberts	Linebacker	Nebraska
2	32	Eric Mahlum	Tackle	California
3	67	Jason Mathews	Tackle	Texas A&M
4	106	Bradford Banta	Tight end	USC
5	133	John Covington	Safety	Notre Dame
6	164	Lamont Warren	Running Back	Colorado

=== Undrafted free agents ===
1994 undrafted free agents of note
Player	Position	College
Aaron Bailey	Wide receiver	Louisville

== Personnel ==
=== Staff ===
1994 Indianapolis Colts staff
Front office: President/treasurer – Robert Irsay; Vice president/general manager – Jim Irsay; Vice president/director of football operations – Bill Tobin; Assistant general manager – Bob Terpening; Director of pro player personnel – Clyde Powers; Director of college player personnel – George Boone; Head coaches: Head coach – Ted Marchibroda; Offensive coaches: Offensive coordinator – Nick Nicolau; Running backs – Gene Huey; Receivers – Jimmy Robinson; Tight ends – Hank Kuhlmann; Offensive line – Ron Blackledge	Defensive coaches: Defensive coordinator – Vince Tobin; Defensive line – Greg Blache; Linebackers – Jim Johnson; Secondary – Pat Thomas; Defensive assistant – Fred Bruney; Special teams coaches: Special teams – Tom Batta; Strength and conditioning: Strength and conditioning – Tom Zupancic

=== Roster ===
1994 Indianapolis Colts roster
Quarterbacks (QB): 12 Jim Harbaugh; 7 Don Majkowski; 18 Browning Nagle; Running backs (RB): 26 Dewell Brewer; 28 Marshall Faulk; 25 Ronald Humphrey KR; 42 Roosevelt Potts FB; 44 Ed Toner; 21 Lamont Warren; Wide receivers (WR): 80 Aaron Bailey; 87 Sean Dawkins; 84 Mark Jackson; 86 Brian Stablein WR; 85 Floyd Turner; Tight ends (TE): 81 Charles Arbuckle; 88 Kerry Cash	Offensive linemen (OL): 69 Randy Dixon G; 75 Cecil Gray T; 63 Kirk Lowdermilk C; 65 Eric Mahlum G; 74 Jason Mathews T; 73 Zefross Moss T; 79 Joe Staysniak G; 71 Kipp Vickers G; 67 Will Wolford T; Defensive linemen (DL): 56 Tony Bennett DE; 90 Steve Emtman DT; 78 Jon Hand DE; 61 Tony McCoy DT; 93 Freddie Joe Nunn DE; 92 Tom Sims DT; 98 Tony Siragusa DT; 95 Bernard Whittington DE	Linebackers (LB): 51 Trev Alberts OLB; 53 Paul Butcher MLB; 55 Quentin Coryatt OLB; 59 Steve Grant OLB; 54 Jeff Herrod MLB; 57 Devon McDonald OLB; 97 Scott Radecic MLB; 52 Brian Ratigan OLB; Defensive backs (DB): 33 Ashley Ambrose CB; 29 Jason Belser S; 34 Ray Buchanan CB/FS; 39 John Covington FS; 38 Eugene Daniel CB; 30 Derwin Gray FS; 23 Leonard Humphries CB; 49 David Tate SS; 36 Damon Watts CB; Special teams (ST): 83 Bradford Banta LS; 4 Dean Biasucci K; 3 Rohn Stark P	Practice squad: 2 Mike Cook WR; 11 Paul Justin QB; -- Barry Wagner WR; Rookies in italics 53 active, 3 practice squad

== Regular season ==
In his NFL debut, Marshall Faulk had three touchdowns.

=== Schedule ===
Week	Date	Opponent	Result	Record	Venue	Attendance
1	September 4	Houston Oilers	**W** 45–21	1–0	Hoosier Dome	47,372
2	September 11	at Tampa Bay Buccaneers	**L** 10–24	1–1	Tampa Stadium	36,631
3	September 18	at Pittsburgh Steelers	**L** 21–31	1–2	Three Rivers Stadium	54,040
4	September 25	Cleveland Browns	**L** 14–21	1–3	Hoosier Dome	55,821
5	October 2	Seattle Seahawks	**W** 17–15	2–3	Hoosier Dome	49,876
6	October 9	at **New York Jets**	**L** 6–16	2–4	Giants Stadium	64,934
7	October 16	at **Buffalo Bills**	**W** 27–17	3–4	Rich Stadium	79,404
8	October 23	Washington Redskins	**L** 27–41	3–5	Hoosier Dome	57,879
9	October 30	**New York Jets**	**W** 28–25	4–5	Hoosier Dome	44,350
10	November 6	at **Miami Dolphins**	**L** 21–22	4–6	Joe Robbie Stadium	71,158
11	Bye					
12	November 20	at Cincinnati Bengals	**W** 17–13	5–6	Riverfront Stadium	55,566
13	November 27	**New England Patriots**	**L** 10–12	5–7	Hoosier Dome	43,839
14	December 4	at Seattle Seahawks	**W** 31–19	6–7	Kingdome	39,574
15	December 11	at **New England Patriots**	**L** 13–28	6–8	Foxboro Stadium	57,656
16	December 18	**Miami Dolphins**	**W** 10–6	7–8	Hoosier Dome	58,867
17	December 24	**Buffalo Bills**	**W** 10–9	8–8	Hoosier Dome	38,458
Note: Intra-division opponents are in **bold** text.

=== Standings ===
AFC East
	W	L	T	PCT	PF	PA	STK
^{(3)} Miami Dolphins	10	6	0	.625	389	327	W1
^{(5)} New England Patriots	10	6	0	.625	351	312	W7
Indianapolis Colts	8	8	0	.500	307	320	W2
Buffalo Bills	7	9	0	.438	340	356	L3
New York Jets	6	10	0	.375	264	320	L5

== Awards and honors ==
- Marshall Faulk, Associated Press Offensive Rookie of the Year
- Marshall Faulk, AFC Pro Bowl selection

== See also ==
- History of the Indianapolis Colts
- Indianapolis Colts seasons
- Colts–Patriots rivalry
