= 1993 Florida State vs. Notre Dame football game =

1993 Florida State vs. Notre Dame
- Non-conference game "Game of the Century"
Florida State Seminoles	Notre Dame Fighting Irish
(9–0)	(9–0)
24	31
Head coach: Bobby Bowden	Head coach: Lou Holtz
AP / Coaches; 1 / 1	AP / Coaches; 2 / 2
	1	2	3	4	Total
Florida State	7	0	7	10	24
Notre Dame	7	14	3	7	31
- Date: November 13, 1993
- Season: 1993
- Stadium: Notre Dame Stadium
- Location: South Bend, Indiana, U.S.
- National anthem: Band of the Fighting Irish
- Referee: Dayle Phillips (ACC)
- Halftime show: Band of the Fighting Irish
- Attendance: 59,075

United States TV coverage
- Network: NBC
- Announcers: Charlie Jones (Play By Play); Todd Christensen (analyst); Bob Costas (studio host); John Dockery (sideline) and O. J. Simpson (sideline)

The 1993 Florida State vs. Notre Dame Game was a regular season college football game between the unbeaten Florida State Seminoles (ranked #1 in the nation), and the unbeaten Notre Dame Fighting Irish (ranked #2 in the nation). The game took place at Notre Dame Stadium in South Bend, Indiana on the campus of the University of Notre Dame. The game is one of the 20th-century college football games to be coined a "Game of the Century."

== Build-up ==
Florida State entered the game as the No. 1 team in the country, led by quarterback Charlie Ward, who would go on to win the Heisman Trophy that season. Notre Dame came into the game ranked No. 2 in the country. Though Notre Dame was home they entered the game as the underdog to a powerful Bobby Bowden-led Florida State squad. Notre Dame was led by head coach Lou Holtz. This was the fourth time that Notre Dame had taken part in a Game of the Century. Notre Dame's 1935 showdown with Ohio State was their first appearance in one of these historic games. Their 1946 match-up against the Army Black Knights was the second instance and their 1966 match-up against the Michigan State Spartans was the third. Additionally, this was the 28th meeting between No. 1 and No. 2. Before this game, Notre Dame had appeared in eight of those matchups, while Florida State had taken part in one.

== Television coverage ==
NBC had exclusive rights to all Fighting Irish home games, and marketed the game as a "Game of the Century." The media coverage leading up to the game was so intense that ESPN decided to broadcast College Gameday on-location at The Edmund P. Joyce Athletic & Convocation Center for the first time in its history. ESPN also showed footage in the week leading up to the game of FSU players touring the Notre Dame campus wearing green hats with shamrocks and gold-embroidered FSU initials on the front.

== The game ==
Notre Dame outplayed Florida State the entire game to the tune of a 31–17 lead in the fourth quarter. The offense had hung its shoulders around their junior back Lee Becton who had yet another 100+ yard afternoon. With 1:39 left, Ward drove Florida State down the field and hit Kez McCorvey on 4th-and-20 for a touchdown. The pass bounced off of Notre Dame safety Brian McGee and into McCorvey's hands. Notre Dame then went three-and-out on their next possession, giving Florida State one last shot. In just three plays, Ward led Florida State to the Notre Dame 14 with three seconds to play. On the last play of the game, Ward rolled out and had his final pass attempt batted down by Notre Dame cornerback Shawn Wooden, giving the Irish a 31–24 victory.

== Aftermath ==
In the polls that were released on the subsequent Monday, both schools simply swapped positions. Notre Dame was now #1 while Florida State slipped to #2.

The following week, the Irish faced #12 Boston College in their regular season finale at home. A win would have likely assured Notre Dame would keep the #1 ranking and earn themselves a shot at the national championship when bowl season began. Instead, Boston College got out to a twenty-one point lead in the fourth quarter and, despite a major rally by Notre Dame to take the lead late in the contest, won 41–39 on a field goal as time expired. The loss dropped Notre Dame to fourth in the polls, and they later fell to fifth before rising once again at the end of the season.

Meanwhile, later that same day, Florida State defeated North Carolina State 62–3. Reclaiming the top spot in the polls with the resounding victory, the Seminoles closed out the regular season with a win in their annual rivalry game against Florida, finishing as Notre Dame did with one loss.

When the season concluded, both teams were invited to a Bowl Coalition game. Notre Dame, finishing the season ranked fourth in the polls, was selected to play against #7 Texas A&M in the Cotton Bowl. Top ranked Florida State was paired against undefeated and second ranked Nebraska in the Orange Bowl.

Notre Dame defeated Texas A&M, 24–21, while Florida State beat Nebraska 18–16. When the final polls were released the next morning, Florida State was voted national champion by both the Associated Press and USA Today Coaches’ polls. Notre Dame received twelve first place votes in the AP and twenty-five in the coaches' poll respectively.

== See also ==
- Game of the Century (college football)
