= Alex Singleton =

Alex Singleton may refer to:

- Alex Singleton (fullback) (born 1989), American football fullback
- Alex Singleton (linebacker) (born 1993), American football linebacker
