= Association of College Football Fans =

Defunct American football organization

The Association of College Football Fans was an organization that produced a weekly ranking of the top 20 NCAA college football teams based on a poll of its dues-paying members. The ACFF was started in 1992 by Don Harris of Nashville, Tennessee, who was dissatisfied with 1991's split national championship between Miami and Washington. The organization was started to give fans a voice in the selection of the college football national champion.

The No. 1 team in the organization's final poll was its college football national champion and was awarded the ACFF Trophy.

== National champions ==
The Association of College Football Fans selected the following college football national champions:

Season	Champion	Record
1992	Alabama	12–0
1993	Notre Dame	11–1
1994	Nebraska	13–0
1995	Nebraska	12–0

=== ACFF Trophy ===
The ACFF awarded its own trophy to the No. 1 team in the final ACFF poll. The trophy took the form of a golden football on a wooden base.
