= 1993 Iowa Hawkeyes football team =

American college football season

1993 Iowa Hawkeyes football

Alamo Bowl, L 3–37 vs. California
- Conference: Big Ten Conference
- Record: 6–6 (3–5 Big Ten)
- Head coach: Hayden Fry (15th season)
- Offensive coordinator: Don Patterson (2nd season)
- Offensive scheme: Pro-style
- Defensive coordinator: Bill Brashier (15th season)
- Base defense: 5–2
- MVPs: Larry Blue; Paul Burmeister; Harold Jasper; Mike Wells
- Captains: Larry Blue; Paul Burmeister; Mike Wells
- Home stadium: Kinnick Stadium

1993 Big Ten Conference football standings
	Conf.					Overall
Team	W		L		T	W		L		T
No. 6 Wisconsin +	6	–	1	–	1	10	–	1	–	1
No. 11 Ohio State +	6	–	1	–	1	10	–	1	–	1
No. 8 Penn State	6	–	2	–	0	10	–	2	–	0
Indiana	5	–	3	–	0	8	–	4	–	0
No. 21 Michigan	5	–	3	–	0	8	–	4	–	0
Illinois	5	–	3	–	0	5	–	6	–	0
Michigan State	4	–	4	–	0	6	–	6	–	0
Iowa	3	–	5	–	0	6	–	6	–	0
Minnesota	3	–	5	–	0	4	–	7	–	0
Northwestern	0	–	8	–	0	2	–	9	–	0
Purdue	0	–	8	–	0	1	–	10	–	0
+ – Conference co-champions; Rankings from AP Poll

The 1993 Iowa Hawkeyes football team represented the University of Iowa as a member of the Big Ten Conference during the 1993 NCAA Division I-A football season. Led by 15th-year head coach Hayden Fry, the Hawkeyes compiled an overall record of 6–6 with a mark of 3–5 in conference play, tying for eighth place in the Big Ten. Iowa was invited to the Alamo Bowl, where the Hawkeyes lost to California. The team played home games at Kinnick Stadium in Iowa City, Iowa.

== Schedule ==
Date	Time	Opponent	Site	TV	Result	Attendance	Source
September 4	1:00 pm	Tulsa*	Kinnick Stadium; Iowa City, IA		W 26–25	66,431	
September 11	12:00 pm	at Iowa State*	Cyclone Stadium; Ames, IA (rivalry)		W 31–28	53,317	
September 18	2:30 pm	No. 14 Penn State	Kinnick Stadium; Iowa City, IA	ABC	L 0–31	70,397	
October 2	11:30 am	at No. 8 Michigan	Michigan Stadium; Ann Arbor, MI	ESPN	L 7–24	105,423	
October 9	1:00 pm	at Indiana	Memorial Stadium; Bloomington, IN		L 10–16	40,066	
October 16	1:00 pm	Illinois^{†}	Kinnick Stadium; Iowa City, IA		L 3–49	70,397	
October 23	11:30 am	at No. 24 Michigan State	Spartan Stadium; East Lansing, MI	ESPN	L 10–24	64,726	
October 30	1:00 pm	Purdue	Kinnick Stadium; Iowa City, IA		W 26–17	65,648	
November 6	1:00 pm	Northern Illinois*	Kinnick Stadium; Iowa City, IA		W 54–20	64,129	
November 13	1:00 pm	at Northwestern	Dyche Stadium; Evanston, IL		W 23–19	33,390	
November 20	1:00 pm	Minnesota	Kinnick Stadium; Iowa City, IA (rivalry)		W 21–3	66,840	
December 31	7:00 pm	vs. California*	Alamodome; San Antonio, TX (Alamo Bowl)	ESPN	L 3–37	45,716	
*Non-conference game; ^{†}Homecoming; Rankings from AP Poll released prior to the game; All times are in Central time

== Game summaries ==
=== Tulsa ===
Tulsa at Iowa

Team	1	2	3	4	Total
Golden Hurricane	3	7	7	8	25
• Hawkeyes	6	6	6	8	26

- Date: September 4
- Location: Kinnick Stadium, Iowa City, Iowa
- Game start: 1:05 PM CDT
- Elapsed time: 3:00
- Game attendance: 66,431
- Game weather: 75 °F (24 °C), Sunny, Wind SW 10–15 mph (16–24 km/h)
- Referee: Jerry Hendrickson
- Sources: Box score and Game recap

Scoring summary
1	9:58	Iowa	Todd Romano 20-yard field goal	Iowa 3–0
1	6:04	Iowa	Todd Romano 53-yard field goal	Iowa 6–0
1	0:45	Tulsa	Brister 25-yard field goal	Iowa 6–3
2	14:33	Iowa	Burmeister 1-yard run (kick failed)	Iowa 12–3
2	9:52	Tulsa	Chris Penn 22-yard pass from Gus Frerotte (Brister kick)	Iowa 12–10
3	10:19	Iowa	Todd Romano 32-yard field goal	Iowa 15–10
2	5:58	Tulsa	Penn 41-yard pass from Gus Frerotte (Brister kick)	Tulsa 17–15
3	4:06	Iowa	Todd Romano 24-yard field goal	Iowa 18–17
4	8:16	Tulsa	White 38-yard pass from Gus Frerotte (Penn pass from Frerotte)	Tulsa 25–18
4	0:53	Iowa	Ryan Terry 2-yard run (Slutzker pass from Burmeister)	Iowa 26–25

=== At Iowa State ===
Iowa at Iowa State

Team	1	2	3	4	Total
• Hawkeyes	14	14	3	0	31
Cyclones	0	7	7	14	28

- Date: September 11
- Location: Jack Trice Stadium, Ames, Iowa
- Game attendance: 53,317
- TV announcers (Cyclones TV Network): Keith Murphy, John Campbell, Rob Bodholdt
- Sources: Box score and Game recap

Scoring summary
1		Iowa	Terry 7-yard run (Romano kick)	Iowa 7–0
1		Iowa	Dean 16-yard pass from Burmeister (Romano kick)	Iowa 14–0
2		Iowa	Shaw 2-yard run (Romano kick)	Iowa 21–0
2		ISU	Garris 6-yard run (Stewart kick)	Iowa 21–7
2		Iowa	Kahl 7-yard run (Romano kick)	Iowa 28–7
3		Iowa	Todd Romano 29-yard field goal	Iowa 31–7
3		ISU	Utter 2-yard run (Stewart kick)	Iowa 31–14
4	9:59	ISU	Norris 7-yard run (run failed)	Iowa 31–20
4		ISU	Branch 3-yard run (Branch run)	Iowa 31–28

=== Penn State ===
Penn State at Iowa

Team	1	2	3	4	Total
• Nittany Lions	3	7	14	7	31
Hawkeyes	0	0	0	0	0

- Date: September 18
- Location: Kinnick Stadium, Iowa City, Iowa
- Game attendance: 70,397
- Television network: ABC
- Sources: Box score and Game recap

Scoring summary
1	PSU	Fayak 20-yard field goal	PSU 3–0
2	PSU	O'Neal 1-yard run (Fayak kick)	PSU 10–0
3	PSU	Pitts 9-yard run (Fayak kick)	PSU 17–0
3	PSU	Ki-Jana Carter 23-yard run (Fayak kick)	PSU 24–0
4	PSU	Pitts 3-yard run (Fayak kick)	PSU 31–0

=== Purdue ===
Purdue at Iowa

Team	1	2	3	4	Total
Boilermakers	0	14	3	0	17
• Hawkeyes	12	14	0	0	26

- Date: October 30
- Location: Kinnick Stadium, Iowa City, Iowa
- Game start: 1:05 PM CDT
- Elapsed time: 2:50
- Game attendance: 65,648
- Game weather: 31 °F (−1 °C), snow flurries, partly cloudy
- Referee: Ron Winter
- Sources: Box score Archived 2019-09-05 at the Wayback Machine

Scoring summary
1	7:09	Iowa	Harold Jasper 55-yard pass from Paul Burmeister (kick blocked)	Iowa 6–0
1	5:11	Iowa	Jasper 22-yard pass from Burmeister (pass failed)	Iowa 12–0
2	14:53	Iowa	Willie Guy 32-yard pass from Burmeister (Romano kick)	Iowa 19–0
2	9:57	Purdue	Mike Alstott 11-yard run (Bobich kick)	Iowa 19–7
2	4:54	Iowa	Paul Burmeister 1-yard run (Romano kick)	Iowa 26–7
2	0:38	Purdue	Mike Alstott 1-yard run (Bobich kick)	Iowa 26–14
3	2:31	Purdue	Bobich 21-yard field goal	Iowa 26–17

=== Northern Illinois ===
Northern Illinois at Iowa

Team	1	2	3	4	Total
Huskies	0	10	0	10	20
• Hawkeyes	7	24	16	7	54

- Date: November 6
- Location: Kinnick Stadium, Iowa City, Iowa
- Game attendance: 64,129
- Sources: Box score and Game recap

Scoring summary
1	Iowa	Odems 37-yard pass from Burmeister (Romano kick)	Iowa 7–0
2	Iowa	Terry 7-yard run (Romano kick)	Iowa 14–0
2	Iowa	Shaw 18-yard run (Romano kick)	Iowa 21–0
2	Iowa	Terry 2-yard pass from Burmeister (Romano kick)	Iowa 28–0
2	NIU	Johnson 26-yard run (Steger kick)	Iowa 28–7
2	Iowa	Romano 27-yard field goal	Iowa 31–7
2	NIU	Steger 22-yard field goal	Iowa 31–10
3	Iowa	Safety, Johnson tackled in end zone	Iowa 33–10
3	Iowa	King 4-yard run (Romano kick)	Iowa 40–10
3	Iowa	King 7-yard run (Romano kick)	Iowa 47–10
4	NIU	Steger 27-yard field goal	Iowa 47–13
4	Iowa	Anttila 22-yard pass from Eyde (Romano kick)	Iowa 54–13
4	NIU	Johnson 81-yard run (Steger kick)	Iowa 54–20

=== At Northwestern ===
Iowa at Northwestern

Team	1	2	3	4	Total
• Hawkeyes	0	13	7	3	23
Wildcats	3	3	0	13	19

- Date: November 13
- Location: Dyche Stadium, Evanston, Illinois
- Game attendance: 33,390
- Game weather: Wind SW 25 mph (40 km/h)
- Sources: Box score and Game recap

Scoring summary
1	NW	Valenzisi 36-yard field goal	NW 3–0
2	NW	Valenzisi 25-yard field goal	NW 6–0
2	Iowa	Terry 5-yard run (kick failed)	Tied 6–6
2	Iowa	Slutzker 3-yard pass from Burmeister (Romano kick)	Iowa 13–6
3	Iowa	Burmeister 1-yard run (Romano kick)	Iowa 20–6
4	NW	Lundy 3-yard run (Valenzisi kick)	Iowa 20–13
4	Iowa	Romano 37-yard field goal	Iowa 23–13
4	NW	Morris 23-yard pass from Steve Schnur (pass failed)	Iowa 23–19

=== Minnesota ===
Minnesota at Iowa

Team	1	2	3	4	Total
Golden Gophers	0	3	0	0	3
• Hawkeyes	7	0	7	7	21

- Date: November 20
- Location: Kinnick Stadium, Iowa City, Iowa
- Game attendance: 66,840
- Sources: Box score and Game recap

Scoring summary
1	Iowa	Ryan Terry 16-yard run (Romano kick)	Iowa 7–0
2	Minn	Chalberg 38-yard field goal	Iowa 7–3
3	Iowa	King 1-yard run (Romano kick)	Iowa 14–3
4	Iowa	King 1-yard run (Romano kick)	Iowa 21–3

The win over Minnesota marked Hayden Fry's 200th career victory.

=== Vs. California (Alamo Bowl) ===
California vs. Iowa

Team	1	2	3	4	Total
• Golden Bears	6	17	7	7	37
Hawkeyes	0	0	3	0	3

- Date: December 31
- Location: Alamodome, San Antonio, Texas
- Game attendance: 45,716
- Game weather: Indoors
- Referee: Gene Wurtz
- TV announcers (ESPN): Sean McDonough, Todd Blackledge, Dave Sims
- Sources: Box score

Scoring summary
1	10:52	Cal	Doug Brien 37-yard field goal	Cal 3–0
1	2:45	Cal	Brien 20-yard field goal	Cal 6–0
2	11:02	Cal	Brien 30-yard field goal	Cal 9–0
2	0:35	Cal	Caldwell 12-yard pass from Dave Barr (Brien kick)	Cal 16–0
2	0:00	Cal	Willard 61-yard interception return (Brien kick)	Cal 23–0
3	10:00	Iowa	Brion Hurley 42-yard field goal	Cal 23–3
3	4:05	Cal	Uwaezuoke 34-yard pass from Barr (Brien kick)	Cal 30–3
4	7:59	Cal	Remington 12-yard pass from Barr (Brien kick)	Cal 37–3

== Roster ==
1993 Iowa Hawkeyes football team roster
Players
Coaches
Offense

Pos.	#	Name	Class
QB	16	Paul Burmeister	Sr
RB	30	Ernest Crank	Sr
WR	86	Anthony Dean	Jr
QB	7	Ryan Driscoll	Fr
OL	67	Fritz Fequiere	Jr
WR	1	Willie Guy	So
WR	83	Harold Jasper	Jr
FB	31	Kent Kahl	Jr
FB	43	Cliff King	Sr
OL	77	Hal Mady	Jr
WR	10	Demo Odems	Fr
OL	69	Matt Purdy	Jr
TE	40	Mark Roussell	Jr
RB	5	Sedrick Shaw	Fr
TE	84	Scott Slutzker	So
RB	32	Ryan Terry	Jr
OL	73	Ross Verba	Fr
C	70	Casey Wiegmann	So

Defense

Pos.	#	Name	Class
DE	95	Larry Blue	Sr
NG	88	Maurea Crain	Sr
LB	45	Bob Diaco	So
DE	9	Bill Ennis-Inge	Fr
DE	42	John Hartlieb	Jr
DB	8	Tom Knight	Fr
DB	6	Scott Plate	Sr
DB	2	Marquis Porter	Sr
DB	3	Damien Robinson	Fr
DL	64	Mike Wells	Sr
DL	56	Parker Wildeman	Jr

Special teams

Pos.	#	Name	Class
K	20	Brion Hurley	Fr
K	17	Todd Romano	So
P	46	Nick Gallery	Fr

Head coach

- Hayden Fry

Coordinators/assistant coaches

- Don Patterson – Offensive Coordinator
- Bill Brashier – Defensive Coordinator
- Milan Vooletich – Defensive ends

Legend

- (C) Team captain
- (S) Suspended
- (I) Ineligible
- Injured
- Redshirt

== Team players in the 1994 NFL draft ==
Player	Position	Round	Pick	NFL club
Mike Wells	DT	6	182	Minnesota Vikings
