= 1993 East Carolina Pirates football team =

American college football season

1993 East Carolina Pirates football
- Conference: Independent
- Record: 2–9
- Head coach: Steve Logan (2nd season)
- Offensive coordinator: Todd Berry (2nd season)
- Offensive scheme: Pro-style
- Defensive coordinator: Larry Coyer (1st season)
- Base defense: 4–3
- Home stadium: Ficklen Memorial Stadium

1993 NCAA Division I-A independents football records
	Conf.			Overall
Team	W	L	T	W		L		T
No. 2 Notre Dame		–		11	–	1	–	0
No. 24 Louisville		–		9	–	3	–	0
Cincinnati		–		8	–	3	–	0
Army		–		6	–	5	–	0
Memphis State		–		6	–	5	–	0
Tulsa		–		4	–	6	–	1
Navy		–		4	–	7	–	0
Tulane		–		3	–	9	–	0
Southern Miss		–		2	–	8	–	1
East Carolina		–		2	–	9	–	0
Rankings from AP Poll

The 1993 East Carolina Pirates football team was an American football team that represented East Carolina University as an independent during the 1993 NCAA Division I-A football season. In their second season under head coach Steve Logan, the team compiled a 2–9 record.

== Schedule ==
Date	Time	Opponent	Site	TV	Result	Attendance	Source
September 9	8:00 pm	No. 6 Syracuse	Ficklen Memorial Stadium; Greenville, NC	ESPN	L 22–41	33,050	
September 18	4:00 pm	No. 20 (I-AA) UCF	Ficklen Memorial Stadium; Greenville, NC		W 41–17	30,867	
September 25	3:30 pm	at No. 16 Washington	Husky Stadium; Seattle, WA		L 0–35	72,108	
October 2	12:00 pm	Memphis State	Ficklen Memorial Stadium; Greenville, NC	PSNTV	L 7–34	25,323	
October 9	1:00 pm	at South Carolina	Williams–Brice Stadium; Columbia, SC		L 3–27	62,307	
October 16	2:00 pm	Louisiana Tech^{†}	Ficklen Memorial Stadium; Greenville, NC		W 31–28	27,103	
October 23	6:00 pm	at Southern Miss	M. M. Roberts Stadium; Hattiesburg, MS		L 16–24	15,227	
October 30	1:00 pm	at Virginia Tech	Lane Stadium; Blacksburg, VA		L 12–31	34,306	
November 6	1:30 pm	Tulsa	Ficklen Memorial Stadium; Greenville, NC		L 26–52	18,130	
November 13	1:00 pm	at Kentucky	Commonwealth Stadium; Lexington, KY		L 3–6	34,500	
November 20	1:00 pm	at Cincinnati	Nippert Stadium; Cincinnati, OH		L 14–34	20,229	
^{†}Homecoming; Rankings from AP Poll released prior to the game; All times are in Eastern time
