= 1993 Cincinnati Bearcats football team =

American college football season

1993 Cincinnati Bearcats football
- Conference: Independent
- Record: 8–3
- Head coach: Tim Murphy (5th season)
- Offensive coordinator: Harry Hiestand (1st season)
- Defensive coordinator: Tom Roggeman (1st season)
- Home stadium: Nippert Stadium

1993 NCAA Division I-A independents football records
	Conf.			Overall
Team	W	L	T	W		L		T
No. 2 Notre Dame		–		11	–	1	–	0
No. 24 Louisville		–		9	–	3	–	0
Cincinnati		–		8	–	3	–	0
Army		–		6	–	5	–	0
Memphis State		–		6	–	5	–	0
Tulsa		–		4	–	6	–	1
Navy		–		4	–	7	–	0
Tulane		–		3	–	9	–	0
Southern Miss		–		2	–	8	–	1
East Carolina		–		2	–	9	–	0
Rankings from AP Poll

The 1993 Cincinnati Bearcats football team represented the University of Cincinnati as an independent during the 1993 NCAA Division I-A football season. Led by Tim Murphy in his fifth and final year as head coach, Cincinnati compiled a record of 8–3. The Bearcats played their home games at Nippert Stadium in Cincinnati.

== Schedule ==
Date	Opponent	Site	Result	Attendance	Source
September 4	Austin Peay	Nippert Stadium; Cincinnati, OH	W 42–10	10,949	
September 11	at Bowling Green	Doyt Perry Stadium; Bowling Green, OH	L 7–21	14,231	
September 18	Miami (OH)	Nippert Stadium; Cincinnati, OH (Victory Bell)	W 30–23	24,377	
September 25	at No. 12 Syracuse	Carrier Dome; Syracuse, NY	L 21–24	48,312	
October 2	at Tulsa	Skelly Field; Tulsa, OK	W 22–15	21,296	
October 9	at Vanderbilt	Vanderbilt Stadium; Nashville, TN	L 7–17	31,176	
October 16	Ball State	Nippert Stadium; Cincinnati, OH	W 44–12	11,614	
October 23	at Toledo	Glass Bowl; Toledo, OH	W 31–24	19,981	
October 30	Memphis State	Nippert Stadium; Cincinnati, OH (rivalry)	W 23–20	14,598	
November 13	at Houston	Houston Astrodome; Houston, TX	W 41–17	10,825	
November 20	East Carolina	Nippert Stadium; Cincinnati, OH	W 34–14	20,229	
Rankings from AP Poll released prior to the game; Source:

== Roster ==
1993 Cincinnati Bearcats football team roster
Players
Coaches
Offense

Pos.	#	Name	Class

Defense

Pos.	#	Name	Class
CB	6	Jocelyn Borgella	Sr
LB	49	Nate Dingle	Sr

Special teams

Pos.	#	Name	Class

Head coach

- Tim Murphy

Coordinators/assistant coaches

Legend

- (C) Team captain
- (S) Suspended
- (I) Ineligible
- Injured
- Redshirt
