= 1993 Navy Midshipmen football team =

American college football season

1993 Navy Midshipmen football
- Conference: Independent
- Record: 4–7
- Head coach: George Chaump (4th season)
- Offensive coordinator: Greg Briner (1st season)
- MVP: Jason Van Matre
- Captains: Jason Van Matre; Javier Zuluaga
- Home stadium: Navy–Marine Corps Memorial Stadium

1993 NCAA Division I-A independents football records
	Conf.			Overall
Team	W	L	T	W		L		T
No. 2 Notre Dame		–		11	–	1	–	0
No. 24 Louisville		–		9	–	3	–	0
Cincinnati		–		8	–	3	–	0
Army		–		6	–	5	–	0
Memphis State		–		6	–	5	–	0
Tulsa		–		4	–	6	–	1
Navy		–		4	–	7	–	0
Tulane		–		3	–	9	–	0
Southern Miss		–		2	–	8	–	1
East Carolina		–		2	–	9	–	0
Rankings from AP Poll

The 1993 Navy Midshipmen football team represented the United States Naval Academy (USNA) as an independent during the 1993 NCAA Division I-A football season. The team was led by fourth-year head coach George Chaump.

== Schedule ==
Date	Time	Opponent	Site	TV	Result	Attendance	Source
September 11		at Virginia	Scott Stadium; Charlottesville, VA		L 0–38	38,900	
September 18		Eastern Illinois	Navy–Marine Corps Memorial Stadium; Annapolis, MD		W 31–10	22,069	
September 25		Bowling Green^{†}	Navy–Marine Corps Memorial Stadium; Annapolis, MD		W 27–20	25,732	
October 2		at Tulane	Louisiana Superdome; New Orleans, LA		L 25–27	21,117	
October 9		Air Force	Navy–Marine Corps Memorial Stadium; Annapolis, MD (Commander-in-Chief's Trophy)		W 28–24	35,752	
October 16		Colgate	Navy–Marine Corps Memorial Stadium; Annapolis, MD		W 31–3	21,780	
October 23		at Louisville	Cardinal Stadium; Louisville, KY		L 0–28	37,214	
October 30	12:00 p.m.	vs. Notre Dame	Veterans Stadium; Philadelphia, PA (rivalry)	ABC	L 27–58	61,813	
November 13		at Vanderbilt	Vanderbilt Stadium; Nashville, TN		L 7–41	21,708	
November 20	1:30 p.m.	SMU	Navy–Marine Corps Memorial Stadium; Annapolis, MD (rivalry)		L 13–42	24,639	
December 4		vs. Army	Giants Stadium; East Rutherford, NJ (Army–Navy Game)		L 14–16	67,852	
^{†}Homecoming; All times are in Eastern time; Source:

== Game summaries ==
=== vs Army ===
Army Cadets (5–5) vs. Navy Midshipmen (4–6)

Quarter	1	2	3	4	Total
Navy	0	0	0	14	14
Army	0	9	7	0	16

at Giants Stadium, East Rutherford, New Jersey

- Date: December 4, 1993
- Game attendance: 67,852
- TV announcers (ABC): Brent Musburger, Dick Vermeil, and Jack Arute
- Recap, Recap

Game information
First quarter
- No scoring

Second quarter

- ARMY – John Lane 2-yard run (kick failed). Army 6–0. Drive: 98 yards.
- ARMY – Rocco Wicks 20-yard field goal. Army 9–0.

Third quarter

- ARMY – Rick Roper 9-yard run (Rocco Wicks kick), 3:50. Army 16–0.

Fourth quarter

- NAVY – Jim Kubiak 3-yard run (pass good). Army 16–8.
- NAVY – Jim Mill 8-yard pass from Jim Kubiak (run failed). Army 16–14.

== Roster ==
1993 Navy Midshipmen football team roster
Players
Coaches
Offense

Pos.	#	Name	Class
RB	23	Steve Bellack	Jr
QB	15	Michael Borchedring	So
QB	14	Eddie Buckles	So
WR	85	Deric Cotton	So
WR	9	Damon Dixon	Jr
G	78	Alex Domino	So
RB	22	Robbie Edwards	Jr
WR	6	Greg Emery	Jr
G	65	John Formoso	Sr
TE	36	Keith Galloway	So
TE	90	Brian Grana	So
TE	87	Kevin Hickman	Jr
RB	29	Lionel Hines	Sr
RB	31	Bill James	Sr
WR	3	Michael Jefferson	Jr
QB	16	Jim Kubiak	Jr
OT	59	Max Lane	Sr
G	61	Zach McMechan	Sr
QB	24	Jeff Melody	So
TE	82	Jim Mill	Sr
C	72	Bruce Minamyer	So
OT	73	David Petko	So
G	70	Dan Pidgeon	Sr
WR	26	Neal Plaskonos	So
C	64	Chuck Puglia	Sr
WR	48	Chris Ruwe	So
WR	84	Matt Scornavacchi	So
WR	80	Jimmy Screen	Sr
RB	4	Cleavon Smith	Sr
C	63	Garrett Smith	So
OT	68	Blair Sokol	Sr
QB	18	Tony Solliday	Jr
C, LS	60	Brad Soper	Jr
TE	88	Jamie Spaman	Jr
FB	46	Brad Stramanak	Sr
C	77	Andy Thomas	Jr
RB	5	Jason Van Matre (C)	Sr
OT	69	Dean Wakeham	Jr
RB	49	Jeff Williams	Sr
RB	28	Monty Williams	So
C	58	John Williamson	So

Defense

Pos.	#	Name	Class
DE	45	Lance Barnes	Sr
DB	17	Anush Collins	So
DE	97	Richard Dent	So
DT	91	Chris Eichinger	So
DB	34	Ted Farrell	So
DB	48	Grover Favors	Jr
DB	10	Josh Gordon	So
DB	40	Lamont Gourdine	Jr
LB	50	Shane Halloran	Jr
LB	52	Fernando Harris	So
DB	33	Chris Hart	Jr
DB	19	Cory James	So
LB	47	Matt Kaslik	Jr
DT	92	Richard Kreh	Sr
DB	35	Steve Lipsey	Sr
DB	20	Kevin Mattix	Sr
LB	53	J.D. McBryde	So
DT	93	Tom Neville	Jr
LB	54	Benjamin Pappas	So
DE	57	Andy Person	So
DE	96	Wes Philbeck	Sr
DE	63	Ed Pidgeon	So
DT	56	Chris Reaghard	Jr
DT	81	Ty Renick	Sr
DB	42	Michael Riggins	Sr
DE	62	David Shaw	Sr
DB	44	Lewis Sims	Sr
DB	13	Joe Speed	So
DB	25	Marcus Starks	So
DE	51	David Stowers	Sr
DE	79	Jim Strauss	So
DB	41	Derek Teff	Sr
DB	32	Andrew Thompson	So
DB	43	Jonathan Wellington	So
DT	95	Stacy Yopp	Sr
ILB	94	Javier Zuluga (C)	Sr

Special teams

Pos.	#	Name	Class
K	15	Ryan Bucchanieri	Fr
K	8	Brian Graham	So
K	2	David Gwinn	Sr
P	1	Brian Schrum	So
K	7	Matthew Tate	Sr

Head coach

- George Chaump

Coordinators/assistant coaches

Legend

- (C) Team captain
- (S) Suspended
- (I) Ineligible
- Injured
- Redshirt

Roster
Last update: 2020-Nov-30
