= 1993 Tulane Green Wave football team =

American college football season

1993 Tulane Green Wave football
- Conference: Independent
- Record: 4–8
- Head coach: Buddy Teevens (2nd season)
- Offensive coordinator: Brud Bicknell (2nd season)
- Home stadium: Louisiana Superdome

1993 NCAA Division I-A independents football records
	Conf.			Overall
Team	W	L	T	W		L		T
No. 2 Notre Dame		–		11	–	1	–	0
No. 24 Louisville		–		9	–	3	–	0
Cincinnati		–		8	–	3	–	0
Army		–		6	–	5	–	0
Memphis State		–		6	–	5	–	0
Tulsa		–		4	–	6	–	1
Navy		–		4	–	7	–	0
Tulane		–		3	–	9	–	0
Southern Miss		–		2	–	8	–	1
East Carolina		–		2	–	9	–	0
Rankings from AP Poll

The 1993 Tulane Green Wave football team was an American football team that represented Tulane University during the 1993 NCAA Division I-A football season as an independent. In their second year under head coach Buddy Teevens, the team compiled a 4–8 record.

== Schedule ==
Date	Opponent	Site	Result	Attendance	Source
September 4	at No. 2 Alabama	Legion Field; Birmingham, AL	W 17–31 (Alabama forfeit)	83,091	
September 11	at Rice	Rice Stadium; Houston, TX	L 0–34	23,400	
September 18	William & Mary	Louisiana Superdome; New Orleans, LA	W 10–0	20,517	
September 25	Mississippi State	Louisiana Superdome; New Orleans, LA	L 10–36	28,580	
October 2	Navy	Louisiana Superdome; New Orleans, LA	W 27–25	21,117	
October 9	Southwestern Louisiana	Louisiana Superdome; New Orleans, LA	L 15–36	25,970	
October 16	at TCU	Amon G. Carter Stadium; Fort Worth, TX	L 7–14	20,987	
October 30	at Boston College	Alumni Stadium; Chestnut Hill, MA	L 14–42	33,298	
November 6	at Southern Miss	M. M. Roberts Stadium; Hattiesburg, MS (rivalry)	W 17–15	16,397	
November 13	No. 15 North Carolina	Louisiana Superdome; New Orleans, LA	L 10–42	20,492	
November 20	at LSU	Tiger Stadium; Baton Rouge, LA (Battle for the Rag)	L 10–24	58,190	
December 4	at Hawaii	Aloha Stadium; Halawa, HI	L 17–56	36,576	
Rankings from AP Poll released prior to the game

== Roster ==
1993 Tulane Green Wave football team roster
Players
Coaches
Offense

Pos.	#	Name	Class
G	77	Erik Bruse	Jr
QB	10	Billy Duncan	Sr
WR	87	Derrick Franklin	Fr
OL	63	Jim Goff	Fr
TE	88	Danny Lasseigne	So
QB	16	Shawn Meadows	Jr
TE	84	Scott Sanchez	Jr
FB	33	Jerald Sowell	Fr
C	61	Mitch Tinsley	Jr
WR	1	Wil Ursin	Sr

Defense

Pos.	#	Name	Class
CB	25	Cedric Anderson	Fr
DT	54	Michael Batiste	Sr
DT	68	Reggie Davis	Sr
LB	23	Wilbert Gilmore	Sr
CB	34	Brandon Hamilton	Sr
LB	44	Ruffin Hamilton	Sr
LB	98	Michael Smartt	Sr
S	7	Willie Smith	Sr
S	15	Mike Staid	Jr

Special teams

Pos.	#	Name	Class

Head coach

- Buddy Teevens

Coordinators/assistant coaches

Legend

- (C) Team captain
- (S) Suspended
- (I) Ineligible
- Injured
- Redshirt
