= 1993 Northwestern Wildcats football team =

American college football season

1993 Northwestern Wildcats football
- Conference: Big Ten Conference
- Record: 2–9 (0–8 Big Ten)
- Head coach: Gary Barnett (2nd season)
- Offensive coordinator: Greg Meyer (2nd season)
- Defensive coordinator: Ron Vanderlinden (2nd season)
- Captains: Steve Ostrowski; Len Williams; Lee Gissendaner
- Home stadium: Dyche Stadium

1993 Big Ten Conference football standings
	Conf.					Overall
Team	W		L		T	W		L		T
No. 6 Wisconsin +	6	–	1	–	1	10	–	1	–	1
No. 11 Ohio State +	6	–	1	–	1	10	–	1	–	1
No. 8 Penn State	6	–	2	–	0	10	–	2	–	0
Indiana	5	–	3	–	0	8	–	4	–	0
No. 21 Michigan	5	–	3	–	0	8	–	4	–	0
Illinois	5	–	3	–	0	5	–	6	–	0
Michigan State	4	–	4	–	0	6	–	6	–	0
Iowa	3	–	5	–	0	6	–	6	–	0
Minnesota	3	–	5	–	0	4	–	7	–	0
Northwestern	0	–	8	–	0	2	–	9	–	0
Purdue	0	–	8	–	0	1	–	10	–	0
+ – Conference co-champions; Rankings from AP Poll

The 1993 Northwestern Wildcats team represented Northwestern University during the 1993 NCAA Division I-A football season. In their second year under head coach Gary Barnett, the Wildcats compiled a 2–9 record (0–8 against Big Ten Conference opponents) and finished in ninth place in the Big Ten Conference.

The team's offensive leaders were quarterback Len Williams with 2,047 passing yards, Dennis Lundy with 617 rushing yards, and Lee Gissendaner with 669 receiving yards.

== Schedule ==
Date	Opponent	Site	TV	Result	Attendance	Source
September 4	at No. 7 Notre Dame*	Notre Dame Stadium; Notre Dame, IN (rivalry)	NBC	L 12–27	59,075	
September 18	No. 22 Boston College*	Dyche Stadium; Evanston, IL		W 22–21	31,086	
September 25	Wake Forest*	Dyche Stadium; Evanston, IL		W 26–14	23,875	
October 2	at No. 7 Ohio State	Ohio Stadium; Columbus, OH		L 3–51	92,744	
October 9	at No. 21 Wisconsin	Camp Randall Stadium; Madison, WI		L 14–53	77,745	
October 16	Minnesota	Dyche Stadium; Evanston, IL		L 26–28	27,814	
October 23	Indiana	Dyche Stadium; Evanston, IL		L 0–24	39,251	
October 30	at Illinois	Memorial Stadium; Champaign, IL (rivalry)		L 13–20	49,940	
November 6	at Michigan State	Spartan Stadium; East Lansing, MI		L 29–31	52,073	
November 13	Iowa	Dyche Stadium; Evanston, IL		L 19–23	33,390	
November 20	No. 14 Penn State	Dyche Stadium; Evanston, IL		L 21–43	30,355	
*Non-conference game; Rankings from AP Poll released prior to the game

== Roster ==
1993 Northwestern Wildcats football team roster
Players
Coaches
Offense

Pos.	#	Name	Class
WR	2	Lee Gissendaner	Sr
RB	34	Dennis Lundy	Jr
OT	70	Matt O'Dwyer	Jr

Defense

Pos.	#	Name	Class
LB	51	Pat Fitzgerald	Fr
CB	16	Chris Martin	So

Special teams

Pos.	#	Name	Class

Head coach

- Gary Barnett

Coordinators/assistant coaches

Legend

- (C) Team captain
- (S) Suspended
- (I) Ineligible
- Injured
- Redshirt
