= David Johnson (quarterback) =

American football player (born 1986)

Biographical details
- Born: January 15, 1986 (age 40); Portland, Oregon, U.S.

Playing career
- 2004–2008: Tulsa
- Position: Quarterback

Coaching career (HC unless noted)
- 2009: Tulsa (GA)
- 2010–2013: Sherman HS (TX) (OC)
- 2014–2016: Central Oklahoma (QB)
- 2017: Missouri Southern (OC)
- 2018: Denton HS (TX) (OC)

Accomplishments and honors

Awards
- Sporting News C-USA Offensive MVP (2008)

David Johnson (born June 28, 1986) is an American former college football quarterback. He played for the Golden Hurricane at the University of Tulsa, where he was the starting quarterback for the 2008 season, after several years as a backup. Johnson finished his senior season as the second-most efficient passer in the nation, behind only Heisman Trophy-winner Sam Bradford of Oklahoma. Johnson himself was mentioned as a Heisman contender by several sources throughout that season.

== Early life ==
David Johnson was born on January 15, 1986, in Portland, Oregon. He attended Southridge High School in Beaverton, Oregon, where he played football as a quarterback. During his senior year in 2003, he completed 110 of 181 pass attempts for 1,640 yards and 15 touchdowns. He also rushed for 375 yards and four touchdowns. As a college prospect, he was overshadowed by Erik Ainge of nearby Glencoe High School, who eventually played as a starting quarterback at Tennessee. As such, Johnson was not recruited by any Division I schools, and so he began a campaign to promote himself as a prospect. The only school that showed an interest was the University of Tulsa. He was contacted by their recruiting coordinator, Matt Wells, who eventually offered Johnson a scholarship.

== College career ==
Johnson redshirted his freshman year in 2004. He then spent his first three years of eligibility as Tulsa's back-up behind Paul Smith, with whom he roomed for two years. For his final remaining season of eligibility, in 2008, Johnson had to compete with anticipated recruit and Bakersfield junior college transfer Jacob Bower for the starting position.

In 2008, he was named Tulsa's starting quarterback, and he led the Golden Hurricane to an 11–3 record. After his performance against New Mexico, in which he completed 24 of 39 passes for 469 yards and six touchdowns, he was named a Conference USA Co-Offensive Player of the Week. It was the first time that a C-USA quarterback had ever thrown for six touchdowns in two games in the same season. Tulsa's three losses in 2008 came in a close contest against Arkansas, a blowout against Houston, and a close but error-filled Conference USA Championship Game against East Carolina. In the 2009 GMAC Bowl, Johnson engineered a rout, 45–13, against Ball State, which had finished the regular season with an undefeated 12–0 record.

In that season, Johnson recorded 4,059 passing yards, 46 touchdowns, and 18 interceptions (five of which were in the C-USA title game), and finished as the second-most efficient quarterback in the nation, behind only the Heisman Trophy winner, Sam Bradford. Johnson was voted an All-Conference USA honorable mention player, and the Sporting News named him the Conference USA Offensive MVP. Johnson was also named a semifinalist for the Draddy Award and the Davey O'Brien Award. During the season, The New York Times, The News & Observer, and CBS Sports had named Johnson as a Heisman Trophy contender.

Former Tulsa starter Paul Smith was one of seven quarterbacks in NCAA history to surpass the 5,000 passing yards benchmark. Johnson said of his predecessor, "I was always learning from him. I didn't feel any pressure. He's the one who's been on my side this whole season, just telling me to go out and break all his [records]." In contrast with Smith's mobile style of play, Johnson is a traditional pocket passer. Tulsa head coach Todd Graham said of Johnson, "We'd like to have a guy who can run, but we've adapted to Dave's style with more drop-back passes instead of naked [bootlegs]." Johnson himself said that "Our expectation is score every time we have the ball."

In 2009, Johnson participated in the Texas vs The Nation game for the Texas team, and threw a 28-yard touchdown pass to Johnny Knox in the third quarter and to Dudley Guice for 22 yards in the fourth, but Texas still lost 27-24.

=== College statistics ===
Season	GP	Passing							
Season	GP	Cmp	Att	Pct	Yds	Lng	TD	Int	Rtg
2005	5	28	41	68.3	236	40	1	1	119.8
2006	5	9	14	64.3	180	59	1	0	195.9
2007	8	4	8	50.0	56	36	0	0	108.8
2008	14	258	400	64.5	4,059	97	46	18	178.7
Totals	32	321	441	72.8	4,531	97	48	19	186.4

== Professional career ==
CBS Sports affiliate, The NFL Draft Scout, ranked Johnson 16th among 123 rated quarterbacks available for the 2009 NFL draft and projected him as an undrafted free agent. As expected, Johnson was not selected by an NFL team, but he was invited to participate in the Green Bay Packers mini-camp on April 30, 2009, alongside former Utah quarterback Brian Johnson. David Johnson said, "All I've ever wanted was an opportunity, and they gave me an opportunity to try out." Both quarterbacks, however, reportedly threw erratically under duress during the mini-camp. Johnson was also invited to participate in the Kansas City Chiefs camp the following week.

Johnson spent three years as the offensive coordinator at Sherman High School in Sherman, Texas. In 2013, he became a graduate assistant, working with quarterbacks, at Tulsa.
