= 1993 Tulsa Golden Hurricane football team =

American college football season

1993 Tulsa Golden Hurricane football
- Conference: Independent
- Record: 4–6–1
- Head coach: David Rader (6th season)
- Offensive coordinator: Mark Thomas (1st season)
- Offensive scheme: Pro set
- Defensive coordinator: Mike Knoll (5th season)
- Base defense: Multiple
- Home stadium: Skelly Stadium

1993 NCAA Division I-A independents football records
| | Conf. | | | Overall |
| Team | W | L | T | W | | L | | T |
|---|---|---|---|---|---|---|---|---|
| No. 2 Notre Dame | | – | | 11 | – | 1 | – | 0 |
| No. 24 Louisville | | – | | 9 | – | 3 | – | 0 |
| Cincinnati | | – | | 8 | – | 3 | – | 0 |
| Army | | – | | 6 | – | 5 | – | 0 |
| Memphis State | | – | | 6 | – | 5 | – | 0 |
| Tulsa | | – | | 4 | – | 6 | – | 1 |
| Navy | | – | | 4 | – | 7 | – | 0 |
| Tulane | | – | | 3 | – | 9 | – | 0 |
| Southern Miss | | – | | 2 | – | 8 | – | 1 |
| East Carolina | | – | | 2 | – | 9 | – | 0 |
Rankings from AP Poll

The 1993 Tulsa Golden Hurricane football team represented the University of Tulsa in the 1993 NCAA Division I-A football season. The Golden Hurricane was led by sixth-year head coach David Rader and played their home games at Skelly Stadium.

== Schedule ==
| Date | Opponent | Site | TV | Result | Attendance | Source |
|---|---|---|---|---|---|---|
| September 4 | at Iowa | Kinnick Stadium; Iowa City, IA | | L 25–26 | 66,431 | |
| September 11 | at Houston | Astrodome; Houston, TX | | W 38–24 | 15,138 | |
| September 18 | Oklahoma State | Skelly Stadium; Tulsa, OK (rivalry) | PPV | L 10–16 | 40,385 | |
| September 25 | at No. 10 Oklahoma | Oklahoma Memorial Stadium; Norman, OK | | L 20–41 | 67,121 | |
| October 2 | Cincinnati^{†} | Skelly Stadium; Tulsa, OK | | L 15–22 | 21,296 | |
| October 16 | at Memphis State | Liberty Bowl Memorial Stadium; Memphis, TN | | W 23–19 | 27,996 | |
| October 30 | Middle Tennessee | Skelly Stadium; Tulsa, OK | | W 38–17 | 17,345 | |
| November 6 | at East Carolina | Ficklen Memorial Stadium; Greenville, NC | | W 52–26 | 18,138 | |
| November 13 | at Arkansas | Razorback Stadium; Fayetteville, AR | | L 11–24 | 28,525 | |
| November 20 | Southern Miss | Skelly Stadium; Tulsa, OK | | T 30–30 | 21,783 | |
| November 25 | Louisville | Skelly Stadium; Tulsa, OK | | L 0–28 | 24,576 | |
^{†}Homecoming; Rankings from AP Poll released prior to the game; Source:

== Personnel ==
=== Roster ===
1993 Tulsa Golden Hurricane football team roster
Players
Coaches
Offense

| Pos. | # | Name | Class |
|---|---|---|---|
| QB | 12 | Gus Frerotte | Sr |
| WR | 86 | Chris Penn |

Defense

| Pos. | # | Name | Class |
|---|---|---|---|
| DB | 42 | Brian Brown | Sr |
| LB | 33 | John Peters | So |

Special teams

| Pos. | # | Name | Class |

Head coach

- David Rader

Coordinators/assistant coaches

- Mike Knoll – Defensive coordinator

Legend

- (C) Team captain
- (S) Suspended
- (I) Ineligible
- Injured
- Redshirt

=== Coaching staff ===
1993 Tulsa Golden Hurricane football staff
| Coaching staff: David Rader – Head coach; Mark Thomas – Assistant head coach/offensive coordinator/offensive line; Mike Knoll – Defensive coordinator/linebackers; Cliff Abbott – Special teams/secondary; Mack Butler – Defensive secondary; Ron Calcagni – Receivers; Ronny Feldman – Tight ends; Colby Schreckengost – Running backs; Ron Taylor – Defensive ends; Michael White – Defensive tackles | Strength and conditioning staff: Tom Cross – Strength and conditioning coordinator; Gary Calcagno – Strength assistant |

== After the season ==
=== 1994 NFL draft ===
The following Golden Hurricane players were selected in the 1994 NFL draft following the season.

| Round | Pick | Player | Position | NFL club |
|---|---|---|---|---|
| 3 | 96 | Chris Penn | Wide receiver | Kansas City Chiefs |
| 7 | 197 | Gus Frerotte | Quarterback | Washington Redskins |
