= 1993 Memphis State Tigers football team =

American college football season

1993 Memphis State Tigers football
- Conference: Independent
- Record: 6–5
- Head coach: Chuck Stobart (5th season)
- Offensive coordinator: Carl Battershell (1st season)
- Defensive coordinator: Tim Rose (2nd season)
- Home stadium: Liberty Bowl Memorial Stadium

1993 NCAA Division I-A independents football records
	Conf.			Overall
Team	W	L	T	W		L		T
No. 2 Notre Dame		–		11	–	1	–	0
No. 24 Louisville		–		9	–	3	–	0
Cincinnati		–		8	–	3	–	0
Army		–		6	–	5	–	0
Memphis State		–		6	–	5	–	0
Tulsa		–		4	–	6	–	1
Navy		–		4	–	7	–	0
Tulane		–		3	–	9	–	0
Southern Miss		–		2	–	8	–	1
East Carolina		–		2	–	9	–	0
Rankings from AP Poll

The 1993 Memphis State Tigers football team represented Memphis State University (now known as the University of Memphis) as an independent in the 1993 NCAA Division I-A football season. The team was led by fifth-year head coach Chuck Stobart and played their home games at the Liberty Bowl Memorial Stadium in Memphis, Tennessee.

== Schedule ==
Date	Opponent	Site	TV	Result	Attendance	Source
September 4	at No. 23 Mississippi State	Scott Field; Starkville, MS		W 45–35	38,669	
September 11	Louisville	Liberty Bowl Memorial Stadium; Memphis, TN (rivalry)		L 28–54	32,573	
September 18	at Southwestern Louisiana	Cajun Field; Lafayette, LA		L 15–17	18,524	
September 25	at Arkansas	War Memorial Stadium; Little Rock, AR		W 6–0	51,733	
October 2	at East Carolina	Ficklen Memorial Stadium; Greenville, NC		W 34–7	25,330	
October 9	Arkansas State	Liberty Bowl Memorial Stadium; Memphis, TN (Paint Bucket Bowl)		W 45–3	18,705	
October 16	Tulsa^{†}	Liberty Bowl Memorial Stadium; Memphis, TN		L 19–23	27,996	
October 30	at Cincinnati	Nippert Stadium; Cincinnati, OH (rivalry)		L 20–23	14,598	
November 6	Ole Miss	Liberty Bowl Memorial Stadium; Memphis, TN (rivalry)		W 19–3	34,026	
November 13	Southern Miss	Liberty Bowl Memorial Stadium; Memphis, TN (Black and Blue Bowl)		W 20–9	13,042	
November 27	at No. 9 Miami (FL)	Miami Orange Bowl; Miami, FL	ESPN	L 17–41	38,737	
^{†}Homecoming; Rankings from AP Poll released prior to the game; Source:
