= 1993 Southern Miss Golden Eagles football team =

American college football season

1993 Southern Miss Golden Eagles football
- Conference: Independent
- Record: 3–7–1
- Head coach: Jeff Bower (3rd season)
- Offensive scheme: I formation
- Defensive coordinator: John Thompson (2nd season)
- Base defense: Multiple
- Home stadium: M. M. Roberts Stadium

1993 NCAA Division I-A independents football records
	Conf.			Overall
Team	W	L	T	W		L		T
No. 2 Notre Dame		–		11	–	1	–	0
No. 24 Louisville		–		9	–	3	–	0
Cincinnati		–		8	–	3	–	0
Army		–		6	–	5	–	0
Memphis State		–		6	–	5	–	0
Tulsa		–		4	–	6	–	1
Navy		–		4	–	7	–	0
Tulane		–		3	–	9	–	0
Southern Miss		–		2	–	8	–	1
East Carolina		–		2	–	9	–	0
Rankings from AP Poll

The 1993 Southern Miss Golden Eagles football team was an American football team that represented the University of Southern Mississippi as an independent during the 1993 NCAA Division I-A football season. In their third year under head coach Jeff Bower, the team compiled a 3–7–1 record.

== Schedule ==
Date	Opponent	Site	Result	Attendance	Source
September 2	Pittsburgh	M. M. Roberts Stadium; Hattiesburg, MS	L 10–14	25,516	
September 18	Northeast Louisiana	M. M. Roberts Stadium; Hattiesburg, MS	W 44–37	20,384	
September 25	at No. 25 Auburn	Jordan-Hare Stadium; Auburn, AL	L 24–35	83,476	
October 2	at Southwestern Louisiana	Cajun Field; Lafayette, LA	L 7–13	22,853	
October 9	at Georgia	Sanford Stadium; Athens, GA	L 24–54	68,458	
October 16	at No. 23 Louisville	Cardinal Stadium; Louisville, KY	L 27–35	36,322	
October 23	East Carolina	M. M. Roberts Stadium; Hattiesburg, MS	W 24–16	15,227	
October 30	at No. 5 Alabama	Bryant–Denny Stadium; Tuscaloosa, AL	W 0–40 (Alabama forfeit)	70,123	
November 6	Tulane^{†}	M. M. Roberts Stadium; Hattiesburg, MS (rivalry)	L 15–17	16,397	
November 13	at Memphis State	Liberty Bowl Memorial Stadium; Memphis, TN (Black and Blue Bowl)	L 9–20	13,042	
November 20	at Tulsa	Skelly Stadium; Tulsa, OK	T 30–30	21,783	
^{†}Homecoming; Rankings from AP Poll released prior to the game

== Roster ==
1993 Southern Miss Golden Eagles football team roster
Players
Coaches
Offense

Pos.	#	Name	Class
OT	78	Todd Beeching	Sr
QB	17	Kevin Bentley	So
RB	21	Barry Boyd	Sr
WR	7	Fred Brock	So
RB	36	Chris Buckhalter	So
QB	10	Ricky Carroll	Jr
WR	28	Donald Cunningham	Fr
OT	68	Brett Duggins	Jr
TE	86	Scott Harper	Jr
RB	35	Ronald Jones	Jr
WR	80	Adam Kennedy	So
RB	38	Howard McGee	Jr
RB	26	Myreon McKinney	So
WR	87	Mark Montgomery	Jr
C	50	Troy Nelson	Jr
TE	83	Larry Norton	Fr
G	52	Jeff Novak	Sr
TE	88	Anthony Owens	Sr
WR	81	Ryan Pearson	Fr
C	54	Kenny Ray	Sr
OT	79	Chris Roberts	Sr
WR	2	Nicky Seymour	Fr
G	51	Darian Smith	Sr
OT	65	Wes Stewart	Fr
QB	8	Tommy Waters	Jr

Defense

Pos.	#	Name	Class
DE	37	Jason Barlow	Fr
DE	48	Robert Brown	Fr
CB	19	Perry Carter	Sr
LB	39	Ramone Crawford	Jr
CB	23	Alvin Dempsey	Fr
DT	96	Reggie Elder	Sr
S	27	Jeff Favre	Fr
FS	13	Shaun Gamble	Jr
FS	29	L. T. Gulley	So
DE	95	Bobby Hamilton	Sr
LB	22	Eugene Harmon	So
DT	91	Kevin Jackson	Sr
DE	97	Aubrey Johnson	Sr
LB	32	Albert McRae	So
LB	45	Tyrone Nix	Sr
CB	5	LaBarion Rankins	Jr
S	30	Melvin Ratcliff	So
CB	3	Rod Thomas	Fr
S	11	Tim Wright	Jr

Special teams

Pos.	#	Name	Class
P	9	Eric Estes	Jr
K	14	Ian McDonald	Jr

Head coach

- Jeff Bower

Coordinators/assistant coaches

Legend

- (C) Team captain
- (S) Suspended
- (I) Ineligible
- Injured
- Redshirt
