= 1993 Notre Dame Fighting Irish football team =

American college football season

1993 Notre Dame Fighting Irish football

National champion (Matthews, NCF) Cotton Bowl Classic champion

Cotton Bowl Classic, W 24–21 vs. Texas A&M
- Conference: Independent

Ranking
- Coaches: No. 2
- AP: No. 2
- Record: 11–1
- Head coach: Lou Holtz (8th season)
- Offensive coordinator: Skip Holtz (2nd season)
- Offensive scheme: Multiple
- Defensive coordinator: Rick Minter (2nd season)
- Base defense: 4–3
- MVP: Jeff Burris
- Captains: Jeff Burris; Tim Ruddy; Aaron Taylor; Bryant Young
- Home stadium: Notre Dame Stadium

1993 NCAA Division I-A independents football records
	Conf.			Overall
Team	W	L	T	W		L		T
No. 2 Notre Dame		–		11	–	1	–	0
No. 24 Louisville		–		9	–	3	–	0
Cincinnati		–		8	–	3	–	0
Army		–		6	–	5	–	0
Memphis State		–		6	–	5	–	0
Tulsa		–		4	–	6	–	1
Navy		–		4	–	7	–	0
Tulane		–		3	–	9	–	0
Southern Miss		–		2	–	8	–	1
East Carolina		–		2	–	9	–	0
Rankings from AP Poll

The 1993 Notre Dame Fighting Irish football team was an American football team that represented the University of Notre Dame as an independent during the 1993 NCAA Division I-A football season. In their eighth year under head coach Lou Holtz, the Irish compiled an 11–1 record, outscored opponents by a total of 403 to 194, and were ranked No. 2 in the final AP and UPI polls. They were selected as the national champion by the National Championship Foundation. During the regular season, they defeated No. 3 Michigan and No. 1 Florida State, but lost to No. 17 Boston College. They concluded the season with a victory over No. 7 Texas A&M in the Cotton Bowl. Florida State was ranked No. 1 in the final AP and UPI polls despite having lost to Notre Dame.

Offensive tackle Aaron Taylor and defensive back Jeff Burris were consensus first-team picks on the 1993 All-America college football team. The team's statistical leaders included quarterback Kevin McDougal (1,541 passing yards), tailback Lee Becton (1,044 rushing yards), split end Derrick Mayes (24 receptions for 512 yards), kicker Kevin Pendergast (87 points scored), and linebacker Justin Goheen (92 tackles).

The team played its home games at Notre Dame Stadium in Notre Dame, Indiana.

== Schedule ==
Date	Time	Opponent	Rank	Site	TV	Result	Attendance	Source
September 4	2:30 p.m.	Northwestern	No. 7	Notre Dame Stadium; Notre Dame, IN (rivalry)	NBC	W 27–12	59,075	
September 11	12:00 p.m.	at No. 3 Michigan	No. 11	Michigan Stadium; Ann Arbor, MI (rivalry)	ABC	W 27–23	106,851	
September 18	2:30 p.m.	Michigan State	No. 4	Notre Dame Stadium; Notre Dame, IN (rivalry)	NBC	W 36–14	59,075	
September 25	3:30 p.m.	at Purdue	No. 4	Ross–Ade Stadium; West Lafayette, IN (rivalry)	ABC	W 17–0	67,861	
October 2	3:30 p.m.	at Stanford	No. 4	Stanford Stadium; Stanford, CA (rivalry)	ABC	W 48–20	80,300	
October 9	2:30 p.m.	Pittsburgh	No. 4	Notre Dame Stadium; Notre Dame, IN (rivalry)	NBC	W 44–0	59,075	
October 16	7:30 p.m.	at BYU	No. 3	Cougar Stadium; Provo, UT	ESPN	W 45–20	66,247	
October 23	2:30 p.m.	USC	No. 2	Notre Dame Stadium; Notre Dame, IN (rivalry)	NBC	W 31–13	59,075	
October 30	12:00 p.m.	vs. Navy	No. 2	Veterans Stadium; Philadelphia, PA (rivalry)	ABC	W 58–27	61,813	
November 13	2:30 p.m.	No. 1 Florida State	No. 2	Notre Dame Stadium; Notre Dame, IN (rivalry, College GameDay)	NBC	W 31–24	59,075	
November 20	1:30 p.m.	No. 17 Boston College	No. 1	Notre Dame Stadium; Notre Dame, IN (Holy War)	NBC	L 39–41	59,075	
January 1, 1994	4:30 p.m.	vs. No. 7 Texas A&M	No. 4	Cotton Bowl; Dallas, TX (Cotton Bowl Classic)	NBC	W 24–21	69,855	
Rankings from AP Poll released prior to the game; All times are in Eastern time

== Rankings ==
Ranking movements Legend: ██ Increase in ranking ██ Decrease in ranking ( ) = First-place votes
	Week																
Poll	Pre	1	2	3	4	5	6	7	8	9	10	11	12	13	14	15	Final
AP	7	7	11	4	4	4	4	3	2	2	2	2	1 (62)	4 (1)	5	4 (1)	2 (12)
Coaches	6 (1)	6	10	5	4	4	4 (1)	3 (2)	2 (3)	2 (3)	2 (2)	2 (2)	1 (60)	4 (1)	4 (1)	4 (1)	2 (25)

== Season summary ==
The 1993 season opened with tempered expectations for the Irish following the loss of four first-round NFL draft picks, among them quarterback Rick Mirer and running back Jerome Bettis. Notre Dame entered the year ranked seventh in the AP preseason poll.

The team also suffered a major setback when Ron Powlus, a highly touted freshman quarterback and the nation's top high school recruit, was lost to injury during the final preseason intrasquad scrimmage. “There was a strong chance he would be No. 1,” Holtz said, but with Powlus sidelined, he named Kevin McDougal the starter for Notre Dame's 1993 season opener.

On November 13, Notre Dame played Florida State in a matchup of unbeatens, with the two ranked No. 1 and No. 2 in the AP poll. The Irish won the game, 31–24, to put themselves in position to lock up a chance to play for the national championship with a win over Boston College in their final game. However, the Eagles kicked a field goal as time expired to secure the upset, winning 41–39. Although both the Irish and the Seminoles had one loss, and Notre Dame won the head‑to‑head meeting, it was Florida State that was selected to face Big 8 champion Nebraska in the Orange Bowl. The Irish would settle for a Cotton Bowl bid, where they defeated Texas A&M.

== Game summaries ==
=== Northwestern ===
Team	1	2	3	4	Total
Northwestern	0	6	6	0	12
• Notre Dame	7	0	10	10	27

- Date: September 4
- Location: Notre Dame Stadium, South Bend, IN
- Game attendance: 59,075
- TV announcers (NBC): Dick Enberg and Bob Trumpy

Scoring summary
1	ND	Bercich 21 yard interception return (Pendergast kick)	ND 7-0
2	NW	Lundy 6 yard pass from Williams (kick failed)	ND 7-6
3	NW	Lundy 11 yard run (pass failed)	NW 12-7
3	ND	Zellers 6 yard run (Pendergast kick)	ND 14-12
3	ND	Pendergast 29 yard field goal	ND 17-12
3	ND	Pendergast 27 yard field goal	ND 20-12
3	ND	Burris 2 yard run (Pendergast kick)	ND 27-12

=== Michigan ===
Team	1	2	3	4	Total
• Notre Dame	10	14	3	0	27
Michigan	3	7	0	13	23

- Date: September 11
- Location: Michigan Stadium, Ann Arbor, Mich.
- Game attendance: 106,851
- Television network: ABC

Scoring summary
1	ND	McDougal 43 yard run (Pendergast kick)	ND 7-0
1	Mich	Elezovic 32 yard field goal	ND 7-3
1	ND	Pendergast 24 yard field goal	ND 10-3
2	ND	M. Miller 56 yard punt return (Pendergast kick)	ND 17-3
2	Mich	Wheatley 1 yard run (Elezovic kick)	ND 17-10
2	ND	McDougal 11 yard run (Pendergast kick)	ND 24-10
3	ND	Pendergast 19 yard field goal	ND 27-10
4	Mich	Wheatley 4 yard run (Elezovic kick)	ND 27-17
4	Mich	Hayes 13 pass from Collins (Collins pass failed)	ND 27-23

=== Michigan State ===
Team	1	2	3	4	Total
Michigan St	7	0	0	7	14
• Notre Dame	0	16	13	7	36

- Date: September 18
- Location: Notre Dame Stadium, South Bend, IN

Scoring summary
1	MSU	Thomas 1 yard run (Stoyanovich kick)	MSU 7-0
2	ND	Farmer 1 yard (kick failed)	MSU 7-6
2	ND	Pendergast 26 yard field goal	ND 9-7
2	ND	Zellers 4 yard pass from McDougal (Pendergast kick)	ND 16-7
3	ND	Pendergast 23 yard field goal	ND 19-7
3	ND	Pendergast 31 yard field goal	ND 22-7
3	ND	Edwards 1 yard run (Pendergast kick)	ND 29-7
4	ND	Becton 12 yard pass from McDougal (Pendergast kick)	ND 36-7
4	MSU	Coleman 5 yard pass from Miller (Stoyanovich kick)	ND 36-14

=== Pittsburgh ===
Team	1	2	3	4	Total
Pittsburgh	0	0	0	0	0
• Notre Dame	7	6	10	21	44

- Date: October 9
- Location: Notre Dame Stadium

Scoring summary
Q1	ND	Becton 8 yard run (Pendergast kick)	ND 7–0
Q2	ND	Zellars 19 yard run (kick failed)	ND 13–0
Q3	ND	Pendergast 27 yard field goal	ND 16–0
Q3	ND	Zellars 11 yard run (Pendergast kick)	ND 23–0
Q4	ND	Kinder 31 yard run (Pendergast kick)	ND 30–0
Q4	ND	Farmer 3 yard run (Marsh kick)	ND 37–0
Q4	ND	Burris 60 yard punt return (Schroffner kick)	ND 44–0

=== USC ===
Team	1	2	3	4	Total
USC	0	7	0	6	13
• Notre Dame	14	14	3	0	31

- Date: October 23
- Location: Notre Dame Stadium, South Bend, IN
- Game attendance: 59,075
- Television network: NBC

Scoring summary
1	ND	Becton 70 yard run (Pendergast kick)	ND 7-0
1	ND	Edwards 2 yard run (Pendergast kick)	ND 14-0
2	ND	Burris 4 yard run (Pendergast kick)	ND 21-0
2	USC	Strother 13 yard pass from Johnson (Salmon kick)	ND 21-7
2	ND	Zellars 29 yard pass from Failla (Pendergast kick)	ND 28-7
3	ND	Pendergast 43 yard field goal	ND 31-7
4	USC	McWilliams 8 yard pass from Johnson (pass failed)	ND 31-13

=== Navy ===
Team	1	2	3	4	Total
• Notre Dame	3	14	21	20	58
Navy	10	14	3	0	27

- Date: October 30
- Location: Veterans Stadium, Philadelphia, PA
- Game attendance: 61,813

Scoring summary
1	NAVY	Bucchianeri 38 yard field goal	NAVY 3-0
1	ND	Pendergast 32 yard field goal	Tied 3-3
1	NAVY	Dixon 31 yard pass from Kubiak (Bucchianeri kick)	NAVY 10-3
2	ND	Edwards 3 yard run (Pendergast kick)	Tied 10-10
2	NAVY	Stramanak 1 yard run (Bucchianeri kick)	NAVY 17-10
2	ND	Edwards 10 yard run (Pendergast kick)	Tied 17-17
2	NAVY	Screen 53 yard pass from Kubiak (Bucchianeri kick)	NAVY 24-17
3	ND	Dawson 44 hard pass from McDougal (Pendergast kick)	Tied 24-24
3	ND	Kinder 70 yard run (Pendergast kick)	ND 31-24
3	ND	Farmer 9 yard run (Pendergast kick)	ND 38-24
3	NAVY	Bucchianeri 34 yard field goal	ND 38-27
4	ND	Burns 3 yard run (Pendergast kick)	ND 45-27
4	ND	Edwards 1 yard run (kick failed)	ND 51-27
4	ND	Taylor 31 yard interception return (Pendergast kick)	ND 58-27

=== Florida State ===
Team	1	2	3	4	Total
Florida State	7	0	7	10	24
• Notre Dame	7	14	3	7	31

- Date: November 13
- Location: Notre Dame Stadium, South Bend, IN
- Game start: Kickoff 1:47pm, NBC coverage begins at 1:30pm
- Game attendance: 59,075
- Game weather: pregame showers, temp near 60, wind from south 20 to 30 mph
- TV announcers (NBC): Charlie Jones, Todd Christensen, Bob Costas (studio host), John Dockery (sideline) and O. J. Simpson (sideline)

The #2 Fighting Irish prevailed over the #1 Florida State Seminoles as ESPN's College GameDay made its first campus visit.

=== Boston College ===
Team	1	2	3	4	Total
• Boston College	10	14	7	10	41
Notre Dame	0	14	3	22	39

- Date: November 20
- Location: Notre Dame Stadium, South Bend, IN
- Game attendance: 59,075
- TV announcers (NBC): Tom Hammond, Cris Collinsworth

Scoring summary
1	8:02	BC	David Gordon 28 yard field goal	BC 3-0
1		BC	Ivan Boyd 5 yard pass from Glenn Foley (Gordon kick)	BC 10-0
2	11:58	ND	Ray Zellars 39 yard pass from Kevin McDougal (Pendergast kick)	BC 10-7
2		BC	Ivan Boyd 35 yard pass from Glenn Foley (Gordon kick)	BC 17-7
2	5:52	ND	#9 1 yard run (Pendergast kick)	BC 17-14
2	0:21	BC	Pete Mitchell 3 yard pass from Glenn Foley (Gordon kick)	BC 24-14
3	11:24	BC	Darnell Campbell 22 yard run (Gordon kick)	BC 31-14
3	3:20	ND	Pendergast 29 yard field goal	BC 31-17
4	11:13	BC	Pete Mitchell 2 yard pass from Glenn Foley (Gordon kick)	BC 38-17
4	10:12	ND	Lee Becton 29 yard run (Becton pass to McDougal)	BC 38-25
4	4:02	ND	Ray Zellars 4 yard run (Pendergast kick)	BC 38-32
4	1:09	ND	Dawson 4 yard pass from McDougal (Pendergast kick)	ND 39-38
4	0:00	BC	David Gordon 41 yard field goal	BC 41-39

== Roster ==
1993 Notre Dame Fighting Irish football team roster
Players
Coaches
Offense

Pos.	#	Name	Class
TE	98	Pete Chryplewicz	So
RB	37	Travis Davis	Jr
WR	87	Lake Dawson	Sr
WR	1	Derrick Mayes	So
FB	30	Marc Edwards	Fr
QB	8	Paul Failla	Jr
RB	25	Randy Kinder	Fr
TE	80	Oscar McBride	Sr
QB	15	Kevin McDougal	Sr
C	61	Tim Ruddy	Sr
OT	75	Aaron Taylor	Sr
RB	34	Ray Zellars	Jr
C	77	Dusty Zeigler	So

Defense

Pos.	#	Name	Class
LB	47	Pete Bercich	Sr
S	9	Jeff Burris	Sr
CB	32	Willie Clark	Sr
CB	29	John Covington	Sr
DT	44	Jim Flanigan	Sr
DT	55	Oliver Gibson	Sr
DT	93	Paul Grasmanis	So
CB	34	Brian Meter	Sr
LB	49	Tony Peterson	Sr
CB	21	Bobby Taylor	So
CB	22	Shawn Wooden	So
DE	48	Renaldo Wynn	So
DE	97	Bryant Young	Sr

Special teams

Pos.	#	Name	Class
K, P	26	Rob Leonard	Sr
K	28	Drew Marsh	Sr

Head coach

- Lou Holtz

Coordinators/assistant coaches

Legend

- (C) Team captain
- (S) Suspended
- (I) Ineligible
- Injured
- Redshirt

== Awards and honors ==
Offensive tackle Aaron Taylor won the Lombardi Award as the best college football lineman. He was also a consensus first-team pick on the 1993 All-America college football team.

Free safety Jeff Burris was a consensus first-team All-American. He was also selected as the ABC Sports Defensive Player of the Year and was selected by his teammates as Notre Dame's most valuable player.

Cornerback Bobby Taylor was a finalist for the Jim Thorpe Award and received first-team All-America honors from the Football Writers Association of America and the Newspaper Enterprise Association.

Center Tim Ruddy received first-team All-America honors from College & Pro Football Newsweekly. He also received second-team honors from the Associated Press (AP), United Press International (UPI), and Football News. Ruddy also received Academic All-America honors.

Defensive tackle Bryant Young was selected as a first-team All-American by the American Football Coaches Association. He also received second-team honors from the AP, UPI, and Football News.

== 1994 NFL draft ==
The following Notre Dame players were selected in the 1994 NFL draft.

Player	Position	Round	Pick	NFL club
Bryant Young	Defensive tackle	1	7	San Francisco 49ers
Aaron Taylor	Tackle	1	16	Green Bay Packers
Jeff Burris	Cornerback	1	27	Buffalo Bills
Tim Ruddy	Center	2	65	Miami Dolphins
Jim Flanigan	Defensive tackle	3	74	Chicago Bears
Willie Clark	Cornerback	3	82	San Diego Chargers
Lake Dawson	Wide Receiver	3	92	Kansas City Chiefs
John Covington	Safety	5	133	Indianapolis Colts
Tony Peterson	Linebacker	5	153	San Francisco 49ers
Pete Bercich	Linebacker	7	211	Minnesota Vikings
