= 1993 Liberty Bowl =

1993 St. Jude Liberty Bowl
- 35th Liberty Bowl
- Program cover for the 1993 game
Michigan State Spartans	Louisville Cardinals
(6–5)	(8–3)
Big Ten	Independent
7	18
Head coach: George Perles	Head coach: Howard Schnellenberger
	AP / Coaches; 25 / 25
	1	2	3	4	Total
Michigan State	7	0	0	0	7
Louisville	3	0	0	15	18
- Date: December 28, 1993
- Season: 1993
- Stadium: Liberty Bowl Memorial Stadium
- Location: Memphis, Tennessee
- MVP: QB Jeff Brohm, Louisville
- Referee: Jimmy Harper (SEC)
- Attendance: 21,097

United States TV coverage
- Network: ESPN
- Announcers: Ron Franklin, Mike Gottfried and Adrian Karsten

The 1993 Liberty Bowl was a college football bowl game played at Liberty Bowl Memorial Stadium in Memphis, Tennessee, on December 28, 1993, as part of the 1993–94 bowl season. The 35th edition of the Liberty Bowl, the game matched the Michigan State Spartans of the Big Ten Conference, and the Louisville Cardinals, a football independent. Louisville defeated Michigan State, 18–7.

== Scoring summary ==
=== First quarter ===
- Michigan State – Duane Goulbourne 1-yard touchdown run (Bill Stoyanovich kick), 10:10 left.
- Louisville – David Akers 31-yard field goal, 7:07 left.

=== Fourth quarter ===
- Louisville – Reggie Ferguson 25-yard touchdown pass from Jeff Brohm (David Akers kick), 12:05 left.
- Louisville – Safety, Craig Thomas tackled in end zone by Joe Johnson and Tyrus McCloud, 8:53 left.
- Louisville – Ralph Dawkins 11-yard touchdown run (kick failed), 4:57 left.

== Statistics ==
Statistics	Michigan State	Louisville
First downs	18	20
Rushing yards	114	172
Passing yards	193	197
Total yards	307	369
Passes (att-comp-int)	28–15–1	31–19–0
Punts–average	5–29.0	5–36.2
Fumbles–lost	0–0	1–0
Penalties–yards	5–60	6–45
