= Tony Peterson =

American football player (born 1972)

Anthony Peterson
No. 53, 57, 50
- Position: Linebacker

Personal information
- Born: January 23, 1972 (age 54); Cleveland, Ohio, U.S.
- Listed height: 6 ft 1 in (1.85 m)
- Listed weight: 232 lb (105 kg)

Career information
- High school: Ringgold (Monongahela, Pennsylvania)
- College: Notre Dame
- NFL draft: 1994: 5th round, 153rd overall pick

Career history
- San Francisco 49ers (1994–1996); Chicago Bears (1997); San Francisco 49ers (1998–1999); Washington Redskins (2000)*
- * Offseason or practice squad member only

Awards and highlights
- Super Bowl champion (XXIX)

Career NFL statistics
- Tackles: 8
- Sacks: 1
- Fumble recoveries: 1
- Stats at Pro Football Reference

Anthony Wayne Peterson (born January 23, 1972) is an American former professional football player who was a linebacker in the National Football League (NFL). He played six seasons for the San Francisco 49ers (1994–1996, 1998–1999) and the Chicago Bears (1997). He played college football for the Notre Dame Fighting Irish and was one of 15 members of their 1993 team to be selected in the 1994 NFL draft.
