= 1993 Michigan State Spartans football team =

American college football season

1993 Michigan State Spartans football

Liberty Bowl, L 7–18 vs. Louisville
- Conference: Big Ten Conference
- Record: 6–6 (4–4 Big Ten)
- Head coach: George Perles (11th season)
- Offensive coordinator: Morris Watts (7th season)
- Defensive coordinator: Norm Parker (6th season)
- MVPs: Brice Abrams; Jim Miller
- Captains: Brice Abrams; Rob Fredrickson
- Home stadium: Spartan Stadium

1993 Big Ten Conference football standings
	Conf.					Overall
Team	W		L		T	W		L		T
No. 6 Wisconsin +	6	–	1	–	1	10	–	1	–	1
No. 11 Ohio State +	6	–	1	–	1	10	–	1	–	1
No. 8 Penn State	6	–	2	–	0	10	–	2	–	0
Indiana	5	–	3	–	0	8	–	4	–	0
No. 21 Michigan	5	–	3	–	0	8	–	4	–	0
Illinois	5	–	3	–	0	5	–	6	–	0
Michigan State	4	–	4	–	0	6	–	6	–	0
Iowa	3	–	5	–	0	6	–	6	–	0
Minnesota	3	–	5	–	0	4	–	7	–	0
Northwestern	0	–	8	–	0	2	–	9	–	0
Purdue	0	–	8	–	0	1	–	10	–	0
+ – Conference co-champions; Rankings from AP Poll

The 1993 Michigan State Spartans football team competed on behalf of Michigan State University as a member of the Big Ten Conference during the 1993 NCAA Division I-A football season. Led by 11th-year head coach George Perles, the Spartans compiled an overall record of 6–6 with a mark of 4–4 in conference play. The Spartans went 6–6 overall and 4–4 in conference play, placing seventh in the Big Ten. Michigan State was invited to the 1993 Liberty Bowl and was defeated by Louisville, 18–7. The team played home games at Spartan Stadium in East Lansing, Michigan.

== Schedule ==
Date	Time	Opponent	Rank	Site	TV	Result	Attendance	Source
September 11	3:30 p.m.	Kansas*		Spartan Stadium; East Lansing, MI	ABC	W 31–14	53,797	
September 18	2:30 p.m.	at No. 5 Notre Dame*		Notre Dame Stadium; Notre Dame, IN (rivalry)	NBC	L 14–36	59,075	
September 25	1:00 p.m.	Central Michigan*		Spartan Stadium; East Lansing, MI		W 48–34	66,533	
October 9	3:30 p.m.	No. 9 Michigan		Spartan Stadium; East Lansing, MI (rivalry)	ABC	W 17–7	78,311	
October 16	3:30 p.m.	at No. 5 Ohio State	No. 25	Ohio Stadium; Columbus, OH	ABC	L 21–28	93,989	
October 23	12:30 p.m.	Iowa^{†}	No. 24	Spartan Stadium; East Lansing, MI	ESPN	W 24–10	64,726	
October 30	2:00 p.m.	at No. 23 Indiana	No. 22	Memorial Stadium; Bloomington, IN (rivalry)		L 0–10	40,110	
November 6	1:00 p.m.	Northwestern		Spartan Stadium; East Lansing, MI		W 31–29	52,073	
November 13	1:00 p.m.	at Purdue		Ross–Ade Stadium; West Lafayette, IN		W 27–24	30,856	
November 27	12:00 p.m.	No. 14 Penn State	No. 25	Spartan Stadium; East Lansing, MI (rivalry)	ABC	L 37–38	53,482	
December 5	11:00 p.m.	vs. No. 10 Wisconsin	No. 25	Tokyo Dome; Tokyo, Japan (Coca-Cola Classic)		L 20–41	51,000	
December 28	8:00 p.m.	vs. No. 25 Louisville*		Liberty Bowl Memorial Stadium; Memphis, TN (Liberty Bowl)	ESPN	L 7–18	21,097	
*Non-conference game; ^{†}Homecoming; Rankings from AP Poll released prior to the game; All times are in Eastern time

== Roster ==
1993 Michigan State Spartans football team roster
Players
Coaches
Offense

Pos.	#	Name	Class
OT	79	Brian DeMarco	Jr
FB	47	Scott Greene	So
OT	63	Shane Hannah	Jr
QB	16	Jim Miller	Sr
WR	1	Muhsin Muhammad	So

Defense

Pos.	#	Name	Class
SS	24	Myron Bell	Sr
LB	83	Rob Fredrickson	Sr
FS	2	Corey Keyes	Sr
SS	37	Steve Wasylk	Sr
DB	18	Brian Winters	Sr

Special teams

Pos.	#	Name	Class

Head coach

- George Perles

Coordinators/assistant coaches

- Dan Enos (Graduate assistant)

Legend

- (C) Team captain
- (S) Suspended
- (I) Ineligible
- Injured
- Redshirt

== Game summaries ==
=== Michigan ===
Team	1	2	3	4	Total
Michigan	0	0	7	0	7
• Michigan St	10	7	0	0	17

- Date: October 9
- Location: Spartan Stadium
- Game attendance: 78,311
- Game weather: Overcast
- TV announcers (ABC): Brent Musburger, Dick Vermeil, and Jack Arute

Scoring summary
Q1		MSU	Abrams 3 yard run (Stoyanovich kick)	MSU 7–0
Q1	9:11	MSU	Stoyanovich 47 yard field goal	MSU 10–0
Q2	11:23	MSU	Greene 3 yard pass from Miller (Stoyanovich kick)	MSU 17–0
Q3		MICH	Alexander 21 yard pass from Collins (Elezovic kick)	MSU 17–7

== 1994 NFL draft ==
The following players were selected in the 1994 NFL draft.

Player	Round	Pick	Position	NFL team
Rob Fredrickson	1	22	Linebacker	Los Angeles Raiders
Myron Bell	5	140	Safety	Pittsburgh Steelers
Jim Miller	6	178	Quarterback	Pittsburgh Steelers
Brice Abrams	7	209	Running back	Pittsburgh Steelers
