= 1993 Army Cadets football team =

American college football season

1993 Army Cadets football
- Conference: Independent
- Record: 6–5
- Head coach: Bob Sutton (3rd season)
- Offensive coordinator: Greg Gregory (5th as OC; 12th overall season)
- Offensive scheme: Triple option
- Defensive coordinator: Denny Doornbos (3rd season)
- Base defense: 4–3
- Captains: Kevin Czarnecki; Mark Escobedo; John Lane; Jason Sutton
- Home stadium: Michie Stadium

1993 NCAA Division I-A independents football records
	Conf.			Overall
Team	W	L	T	W		L		T
No. 2 Notre Dame		–		11	–	1	–	0
No. 24 Louisville		–		9	–	3	–	0
Cincinnati		–		8	–	3	–	0
Army		–		6	–	5	–	0
Memphis State		–		6	–	5	–	0
Tulsa		–		4	–	6	–	1
Navy		–		4	–	7	–	0
Tulane		–		3	–	9	–	0
Southern Miss		–		2	–	8	–	1
East Carolina		–		2	–	9	–	0
Rankings from AP Poll

The 1993 Army Cadets football team was an American football team that represented the United States Military Academy as an independent during the 1993 NCAA Division I-A football season. In their third season under head coach Bob Sutton, the Cadets compiled a 6–5 record and outscored their opponents by a total of 289 to 243. In the annual Army–Navy Game, the Cadets defeated Navy, 16–14.

== Schedule ==
Date	Opponent	Site	Result	Attendance	Source
September 11	Colgate	Michie Stadium; West Point, NY	W 30–0	26,398	
September 18	at Duke	Wallace Wade Stadium; Durham, NC	L 21–42	21,300	
September 25	VMI	Michie Stadium; West Point, NY	W 31–9	32,441	
October 2	Akron	Michie Stadium; West Point, NY	W 35–14	29,727	
October 9	at Temple	Veterans Stadium; Philadelphia, PA	W 56–21	8,889	
October 16	Rutgers	Michie Stadium; West Point, NY	L 38–45	40,759	
October 23	at Boston College	Alumni Stadium; Chestnut Hill, MA	L 14–41	33,298	
October 30	Western Michigan	Michie Stadium; West Point, NY	L 7–20	40,786	
November 6	at Air Force	Falcon Stadium; Colorado Springs, CO (Commander-in-Chief's Trophy)	L 6–25	41,032	
November 13	Lafayette	Michie Stadium; West Point, NY	W 35–12	32,701	
December 4	vs. Navy	Giants Stadium; East Rutherford, NJ (Army–Navy Game)	W 16–14	67,852	

== Game summaries ==
=== vs Navy ===
Army Cadets (5–5) vs. Navy Midshipmen (4–6)

Quarter	1	2	3	4	Total
Navy	0	0	0	14	14
Army	0	9	7	0	16

at Giants Stadium, East Rutherford, New Jersey

- Date: December 4, 1993
- Game attendance: 67,852
- TV announcers (ABC): Brent Musburger, Dick Vermeil, and Jack Arute
- Recap, Recap

Game information
First quarter
- No scoring

Second quarter

- ARMY – John Lane 2-yard run (kick failed). Army 6–0. Drive: 98 yards.
- ARMY – Rocco Wicks 20-yard field goal. Army 9–0.

Third quarter

- ARMY – Rick Roper 9-yard run (Rocco Wicks kick), 3:50. Army 16–0.

Fourth quarter

- NAVY – Jim Kubiak 3-yard run (pass good). Army 16–8.
- NAVY – Jim Mill 8-yard pass from Jim Kubiak (run failed). Army 16–14.

Navy kicker Ryan Bucchianeri missed an 18-yard field goal wide right in the closing seconds to preserve the Army win.

External videos
- Game highlights

== Roster ==
1993 Army Cadets football team roster
Players
Coaches
Offense

Pos.	#	Name	Class
WR		Paul Andrzejewski
OL		Bill Blair
RB		John Conroy
OL		Mark Conway
RB		Chad Davis
RB		James Duncan
OT		Mark Escobedo
OL		Josh Freeman
WR		Leon Gantt
RB		Lee Gibson
WR		Dondra Jolly
FB		Akili King
OL		Mike Krause
HB		John Lane	Sr
QB		Phil Lenz
WR		Rob Leshinski
QB		Mike Makovec
QB		Jay Martin
RB		Mark Molinar
QB		Abdullah Muhammad
OL		Kevin Muir
OL		Troy Prehar
RB		Mike Robinson
QB		Rick Roper
RB		Joe Ross
OL		Ed Stover
RB		Kevin Vaughn
RB		Dave Wojczynski
RB		Abel Young

Defense

Pos.	#	Name	Class
DE		Anthony Bianchi	Fr
LB		Thomas Burrell	So
S		Jim Cantelupe
DB		James Chun
LB		Kevin Czarnecki
DL		Joel Davis
DB		Garland Gay
DL		Gary Graves
LB		Bob Heckathorne
DL		Colin Kearns
LB		Ben Kotwica	Fr
DB		Landis Maddox
LB		Jason Miller
DL		Aaron Mitchell
LB		Eric Oliver
DB		Brett Rice
DL		Jim Slomka
CB		Jason Sutton
DB		Jami Wolocko
LB		Pat Work

Special teams

Pos.	#	Name	Class
LS		J.R. West
K		Rocco Wicks

Head coach

- Bob Sutton

Coordinators/assistant coaches

Legend

- (C) Team captain
- (S) Suspended
- (I) Ineligible
- Injured
- Redshirt
