= 1994 Cotton Bowl Classic =

1994 Mobil Cotton Bowl Classic
- 58th Cotton Bowl Classic
Notre Dame Fighting Irish	Texas A&M Aggies
(10–1)	(10–1)
Independent	SWC
24	21
Head coach: Lou Holtz	Head coach: R. C. Slocum
AP / Coaches / BC; 4 / 4 / 4	AP / Coaches / BC; 7 / 6 / 7
	1	2	3	4	Total
Notre Dame	7	0	14	3	24
Texas A&M	7	7	7	0	21
- Date: January 1, 1994
- Season: 1993
- Stadium: Cotton Bowl
- Location: Dallas, Texas
- MVP: RB Lee Becton (Notre Dame); L Antonio Shorter (Texas A&M)
- Referee: Bill Richardson (Pac-10)
- Attendance: 69,855

United States TV coverage
- Network: NBC
- Announcers: Charlie Jones and Todd Christensen

The Cotton Bowl in Dallas, Texas, hosted the Cotton Bowl Classic.

The 1994 Mobil Cotton Bowl Classic was the fifty-eighth edition of the college football bowl game, played January 1, 1994, at the Cotton Bowl in Dallas, Texas. The game featured the Notre Dame Fighting Irish versus the Southwest Conference champion Texas A&M Aggies. The game was a rematch of the 1993 Cotton Bowl, which Notre Dame also won. Furthermore, Notre Dame had the chance with its win to split the national championship with Florida State, whom they had beaten earlier in the season.

This was Notre Dame's last bowl win until 2008, and their win in a major bowl game until January 2025, as the Fighting Irish lost ten straight major bowl games (one vacated) after their Cotton Bowl victory.
