= 1993 Louisville Cardinals football team =

American college football season

1993 Louisville Cardinals football

Liberty Bowl champion

Liberty Bowl, W 18–7 vs. Michigan State
- Conference: Independent

Ranking
- Coaches: No. 23
- AP: No. 24
- Record: 9–3
- Head coach: Howard Schnellenberger (9th season)
- Offensive coordinator: Gary Nord (5th season)
- Defensive coordinator: Ty Smith (3rd season)
- Home stadium: Cardinal Stadium

1993 NCAA Division I-A independents football records
	Conf.			Overall
Team	W	L	T	W		L		T
No. 2 Notre Dame		–		11	–	1	–	0
No. 24 Louisville		–		9	–	3	–	0
Cincinnati		–		8	–	3	–	0
Army		–		6	–	5	–	0
Memphis State		–		6	–	5	–	0
Tulsa		–		4	–	6	–	1
Navy		–		4	–	7	–	0
Tulane		–		3	–	9	–	0
Southern Miss		–		2	–	8	–	1
East Carolina		–		2	–	9	–	0
Rankings from AP Poll

The 1993 Louisville Cardinals football team represented the University of Louisville as an independent during the 1993 NCAA Division I-A football season. Led by ninth -year head coach Howard Schnellenberger, the Cardinals compiled a record of 9–3. Louisville was invited to the Liberty Bowl, where they beat Michigan State. The team played home games in Cardinal Stadium in Louisville, Kentucky.

== Schedule ==
Date	Opponent	Rank	Site	TV	Result	Attendance	Source
September 4	San Jose State		Cardinal Stadium; Louisville, KY		W 31–24	35,923	
September 11	at Memphis State		Liberty Bowl Memorial Stadium; Memphis, TN (rivalry)		W 54–28	32,573	
September 18	No. 23 Arizona State		Cardinal Stadium; Louisville, KY		W 35–17	39,639	
September 25	Texas	No. 24	Cardinal Stadium; Louisville, KY	PPV	W 41–10	38,492	
October 2	at Pittsburgh	No. 18	Pitt Stadium; Pittsburgh, PA		W 29–7	28,528	
October 9	at No. 24 West Virginia	No. 17	Mountaineer Field; Morgantown, WV		L 34–36	57,578	
October 16	Southern Miss	No. 23	Cardinal Stadium; Louisville, KY		W 35–27	36,332	
October 23	Navy	No. 20	Cardinal Stadium; Louisville, KY		W 28–0	37,214	
November 6	at No. 7 Tennessee	No. 13	Neyland Stadium; Knoxville, TN	ABC	L 10–45	94,826	
November 13	at No. 11 Texas A&M	No. 20	Kyle Field; College Station, TX	ESPN	L 7–42	56,161	
November 25	at Tulsa	No. 23	Skelly Stadium; Tulsa, OK		W 28–0	24,576	
December 28	vs. Michigan State	No. 25	Liberty Bowl Memorial Stadium; Memphis, TN (Liberty Bowl)	ESPN	W 18–7	21,097	
Rankings from AP Poll released prior to the game; Source:

== Roster ==
1993 Louisville Cardinals football team roster
Players
Coaches
Offense

Pos.	#	Name	Class
TE	37	Jamie Asher
WR	6	Aaron Bailey
QB	11	Jeff Brohm	Sr

Defense

Pos.	#	Name	Class
DE	94	Joe Johnson

Special teams

Pos.	#	Name	Class

Head coach

- Howard Schnellenberger

Coordinators/assistant coaches

Legend

- (C) Team captain
- (S) Suspended
- (I) Ineligible
- Injured
- Redshirt

== Players in the NFL ==
Player	Position	Round	Pick	NFL team
Joe Johnson	Defensive end	1	13	New Orleans Saints
