= Damaris Johnson =

American gridiron football player (born 1989)

No. 13, 15
- Position: Wide receiver

Personal information
- Born: November 22, 1989 (age 36); Norco, Louisiana, U.S.
- Listed height: 5 ft 8 in (1.73 m)
- Listed weight: 175 lb (79 kg)

Career information
- High school: Destrehan (Destrehan, Louisiana)
- College: Tulsa
- NFL draft: 2012: undrafted

Career history
- Philadelphia Eagles (2012–2013); Houston Texans (2014); New England Patriots (2015); Tennessee Titans (2015); BC Lions (2016)

Awards and highlights
- Second-team All-American (2010); C-USA Special Teams POY (2010); First-team All-C-USA (2010); Second-team All-C-USA (2009)

Career NFL statistics
- Receptions: 52
- Receiving yards: 601
- Return yards: 1,025
- Total touchdowns: 2
- Stats at Pro Football Reference

Damaris Keith Johnson (born November 22, 1989) is an American former professional football player who was a wide receiver and return specialist in the National Football League (NFL). After playing college football for the Tulsa Golden Hurricane, he was signed by the Philadelphia Eagles as an undrafted free agent in 2012.

== Early life ==
Johnson was born in Norco, Louisiana where he was raised by his single mother Lori Johnson. According to Johnson, his first cousin Mark Young acted as a surrogate father and taught him how to play football. He attended Destrehan High School in Destrehan, Louisiana where he became a three-year letter winner in football. He eventually became the all-time leading receiver at Destrehan High School with a career record of 154 receptions, 2,620 yards, and 30 touchdowns. In his senior year alone, he made 81 receptions for 1,228 yards, and 12 touchdowns. That year, Destrehan High School achieved a 14–0 record and won the state championship. Johnson was named the Louisiana Championship game Most Valuable Player (MVP) and the New Orleans Metro MVP, and was twice named an all-state and all-New Orleans Metro player.

Johnson was highly ranked as a college prospect by several websites, but was not shown much interest by the major football schools due in part to his small stature. His high school coach Stephen Robicheaux said, "If he were two inches taller, he could have gone anywhere in the country." Rivals.com assigned him a four-star rating and named him the 11th-ranked college prospect in Louisiana and the 28th-ranked athlete in the nation. Scout.com assessed him as the 21st-ranked college prospect in the state. Johnson selected Tulsa over Texas Christian, Memphis, and Louisiana Tech.

== College career ==
Against UTEP, Johnson set a Tulsa school record for single-game kickoff return yards with 211 yards on six returns. In the first quarter, Johnson returned a kick 98 yards for a touchdown to equalize the game at 28 and shift the momentum in favor of Tulsa. By the game's end, Johnson had accumulated 296 all-purpose yards and was named a Conference USA Player of the Week. Against New Mexico, Johnson caught five passes for 109 yards and three touchdowns. Tulsa head coach Todd Graham said that true freshman "Damaris Johnson is as explosive of a freshman or any player I've seen, freshman or senior." He led his team and the conference in all-purpose yardage with 2,201 yards and set a Tulsa school record for single-season kickoff return yards with 1,319.

In 2008, Johnson was named to the All-Conference USA second-team as a kick returner and All-Conference USA honorable mention as a wide receiver. The Sporting News named him a first-team freshman All-American, Rivals.com named him a first-team freshman All-American as an all-purpose player and Phil Steele's College Football magazine named him a second-team freshman All-American kick returner. On December 24, 2010, in the Hawaii Bowl game, Johnson broke the NCAA record for all purpose yardage with 326 in a 62–35 win for Tulsa.

=== Collegiate statistics ===
Damaris Johnson						Receiving				Rushing			
Year	School	Conf	Class	Pos	G	Rec	Yds	Avg	TD	Att	Yds	Avg	TD
2008	Tulsa	CUSA	FR	WR	14	53	743	14.0	10	41	327	8.0	1
2009	Tulsa	CUSA	SO	WR	12	78	1,131	14.5	3	26	175	6.7	0
2010	Tulsa	CUSA	JR	WR	13	57	872	15.3	4	55	560	10.2	7
Career	Tulsa				39	188	2,746	14.6	17	122	1,062	8.7	8

Damaris Johnson					Kick returns					Punt returns			
Year	School	Conf	Class	Pos	G	Ret	Yds	Avg	TD	Ret	Yds	Avg	TD
2008	Tulsa	CUSA	FR	WR	14	54	1,382	25.6	1	6	23	3.8	0
2009	Tulsa	CUSA	SO	WR	12	46	1,131	24.6	0	18	256	14.2	1
2010	Tulsa	CUSA	JR	WR	13	34	904	26.6	1	23	292	12.7	1
Career	Tulsa				39	134	3,417	25.5	2	47	571	12.1	2

=== Suspension ===
Johnson was suspended indefinitely on August 25, 2011, following questions about his role in his girlfriend's arrest for felony embezzlement. Johnson's girlfriend, Chamon Jones, was accused of ringing up $2,610 worth of merchandise over the course of two purchases at the Tulsa Macy's she worked at, but only charging Johnson just over $13 in total. Johnson was initially questioned and released, but on August 31 Johnson was also charged with felony embezzlement by the Tulsa County District Attorney's office. In October 2011, Johnson pleaded guilty to the charge and received a deferred sentence.

== Professional career ==
=== Philadelphia Eagles ===
Johnson was signed by the Philadelphia Eagles as an undrafted free agent on April 29, 2012. It was announced on August 31, 2012, that Johnson made the roster. On Friday, September 21, it was announced that Johnson would start along with DeSean Jackson against the Arizona Cardinals, replacing the injured Jeremy Maclin. Johnson performed respectably, catching five passes for 84 yards in the 27–6 loss, but he returned to the bench when Maclin returned. On Sunday, December 2, 2012, during Sunday Night Football, he returned a 98-yard punt for a touchdown against the Dallas Cowboys, which is tied for the third longest punt return in NFL history. He was released by the Eagles on August 30, 2014, and picked up by the Houston Texans.

=== Houston Texans ===
On September 21, 2014, Johnson caught a 44-yard touchdown pass from quarterback Ryan Fitzpatrick for his first career touchdown. Johnson played in all 16 games for the Texans in 2014. The Texans waived him at the end of preseason in September 2015.

=== New England Patriots ===
Johnson was signed by the New England Patriots on December 1, 2015. He played one game against his former team, the Eagles, where he had one run for six yards. He was later released by the team on December 16, 2015.

=== Tennessee Titans ===
On December 17, 2015, the Tennessee Titans claimed Johnson off of waivers. On May 9, 2016, he was released from the team.

=== British Columbia Lions ===
On July 24, 2016, the BC Lions signed Johnson to their practice roster, but was released on August 9, 2016.

== Personal life ==
Johnson and his wife, Chamon Jones Johnson, have three sons. The family resides in La Place, Louisiana right outside of his hometown Norco, Louisiana.
