= John Covington =

American football player (born 1972)

No. 39
- Position: Safety

Personal information
- Born: April 22, 1972 (age 54); Winter Haven, Florida, U.S.
- Listed height: 6 ft 0 in (1.83 m)
- Listed weight: 198 lb (90 kg)

Career information
- High school: Winter Haven
- College: Notre Dame
- NFL draft: 1994: 5th round, 133rd overall pick

Career history
- Indianapolis Colts (1994); New Orleans Saints (1996)*; San Francisco 49ers (1997)
- * Offseason or practice squad member only

Career NFL statistics
- Tackles: 2
- Stats at Pro Football Reference

John Shaft Covington (born April 22, 1972) is an American former professional football player who was a safety in the National Football League (NFL). He played one season in the NFL for the Indianapolis Colts, who selected him in the fifth round of the 1994 NFL draft with the 133rd overall pick. Covington played college football for the Notre Dame Fighting Irish.
