= Steve Gage =

American football player (born 1964)

No. 48
- Position: Defensive back

Personal information
- Born: May 10, 1964 (age 62); Claremore, Oklahoma, U.S.
- Listed height: 6 ft 3 in (1.91 m)
- Listed weight: 210 lb (95 kg)

Career information
- High school: Claremore
- College: Tulsa
- NFL draft: 1987: 6th round, 144th overall pick

Career history
- Washington Redskins (1987–1988); Miami Dolphins (1989)*; Birmingham Fire (1991)
- * Offseason or practice squad member only

Awards and highlights
- Super Bowl champion (XXII)

Career NFL statistics
- Interceptions: 1
- Stats at Pro Football Reference

Steven Glen Gage (born May 10, 1964) is an American former professional football player who was a safety in the National Football League (NFL) for the Washington Redskins from 1987 to 1988. He played college football for the Tulsa Golden Hurricane and was selected in the sixth round of the 1987 NFL draft with the 144th overall pick.
