= Gordon Brown (running back) =

American football player (born 1963)

No. 42
- Position: Running back

Personal information
- Born: March 19, 1963 (age 63); Philadelphia, Pennsylvania, U.S.
- Listed height: 5 ft 11 in (1.80 m)
- Listed weight: 220 lb (100 kg)

Career information
- High school: Newport News (VA) Denbigh
- College: Tulsa
- NFL draft: 1986: undrafted

Career history
- Pittsburgh Steelers (1986)*; Indianapolis Colts (1987)
- * Offseason or practice squad member only

Career NFL statistics
- Rushing yards: 85
- Rush attempts: 19
- Rushing TDs: 1
- Games played: 3
- Stats at Pro Football Reference

Gordon S. Brown (born March 19, 1963) is an American former professional football player who was a running back for the Indianapolis Colts of the National Football League (NFL). He played college football for the Tulsa Golden Hurricane.
