= Howard Waugh =

American gridiron football player (1931–2009)

Profile
- Position: Halfback

Personal information
- Born: February 24, 1931; Grenada, Mississippi, U.S.
- Died: November 29, 2009 (aged 78); Tulsa, Oklahoma, U.S.

Career information
- College: Tulsa
- NFL draft: 1953: 6th round, 72nd overall pick

Career history
- 1954 & 1957: Calgary Stampeders

Awards and highlights
- Eddie James Memorial Trophy (1954); CFL West All-Star (1954)

Howard Waugh (February 24, 1931 – November 29, 2009) was an all-star and record setting halfback who played in the Western Interprovincial Football Union with the Calgary Stampeders.

A graduate of the University of Tulsa, Waugh joined the Calgary Stampeders in 1954. He made Canadian football history when he became the first player to officially rush for more than 1,000 yards in a season (1043). His promising all-star career was interrupted with two years of military service. Waugh returned to the Stamps for one final season, and in 1957 he rushed for 499 yards and two touchdowns and added eight catches for 122 yards.

Waugh later worked with IBM and had a long career in house construction, his most passionate and rewarding career as construction supervisor for Tulsa Habitat for Humanity. He died November 27, 2009, age 78.

== See also ==
- List of college football yearly rushing leaders
