= Sedric Clark =

American gridiron football player (born 1973)

No. 52, 55, 56, 91, 57
- Position: Linebacker

Personal information
- Born: January 28, 1973 (age 53); Missouri City, Texas, U.S.
- Listed height: 6 ft 2 in (1.88 m)
- Listed weight: 245 lb (111 kg)

Career information
- High school: Willowridge (Houston, Texas)
- College: Tulsa
- NFL draft: 1996: 7th round, 220th overall pick

Career history
- Oakland Raiders (1996)*; St. Louis Rams (1996)*; Jacksonville Jaguars (1996)*; New Orleans Saints (1996)*; Baltimore Ravens (1996); Carolina Panthers (1997)*; Frankfurt Galaxy (1998); Seattle Seahawks (1999)*; Berlin Thunder (1999–2000); Orlando Rage (2001); Hamilton Tiger-Cats (2002)
- * Offseason or practice squad member only

Career NFL statistics
- Tackles: 1
- Stats at Pro Football Reference

Sedric Clark (born January 28, 1973) is an American former professional football player who was a linebacker in the National Football League (NFL), NFL Europe and the XFL. He was selected in the seventh round of the 1996 NFL draft. In his five-year pro career he played for the Baltimore Ravens of the NFL, the Frankfurt Galaxy and Berlin Thunder of NFL Europe, and the Orlando Rage of the XFL. Clark played college football for the Tulsa Golden Hurricane.

== Professional career ==
=== Oakland Raiders ===
Clark was selected by the Oakland Raiders in the seventh round (220th overall) of the 1996 NFL draft.
