= Alex Singleton (fullback) =

American football player (born 1989)

No. 8
- Position: Fullback

Personal information
- Born: November 7, 1989 (age 36); New Orleans, Louisiana, U.S.
- Listed height: 6 ft 0 in (1.83 m)
- Listed weight: 265 lb (120 kg)

Career information
- High school: East St. John (Reserve, Louisiana)
- College: Tulsa
- NFL draft: 2013: undrafted

Career history
- Arizona Rattlers (2014)

Awards and highlights
- ArenaBowl champion (2014)

Career AFL statistics
- Rushing attempts: 66
- Rushing yards: 170
- Rushing touchdowns: 14
- Receiving yards: 179
- Receiving touchdowns: 3
- Stats at ArenaFan.com

Alex Singleton (born November 7, 1989) is an American former football fullback. He played college football at Tulsa where he was a running back. He was signed as an undrafted free agent by the Oakland Raiders in 2013.

== Professional career ==
Pre-draft measurables
Height	Weight	Arm length	Hand span	Wingspan	40-yard dash	10-yard split	20-yard split	20-yard shuttle	Three-cone drill	Vertical jump	Broad jump	Bench press
5 ft 11 5/8 in (1.82 m)	265 lb (120 kg)	30 7/8 in (0.78 m)	9 7/8 in (0.25 m)	6 ft 2 1/4 in (1.89 m)	5.07 s	1.69 s	2.91 s	4.53 s	7.53 s	29.5 in (0.75 m)	9 ft 3 in (2.82 m)	24 reps
All values from Pro Day

After going undrafted during the 2013 NFL draft, Singleton attended camp at the Oakland Raiders. After participating in rookie mini-camp, he was let go.

On January 2, 2014, Singleton was assigned to the Arizona Rattlers of the Arena Football League (AFL).
