= Paul Smith (quarterback) =

American gridiron football player (born 1984)

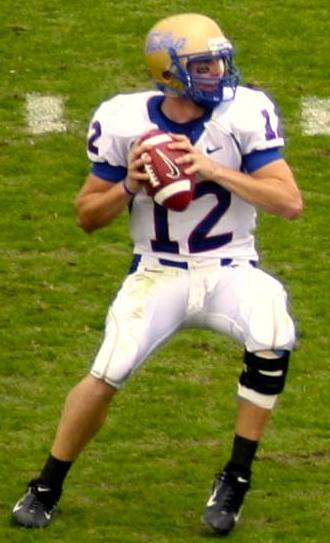
- Smith with the Tulsa Golden Hurricane in 2007

No. 12
- Position: Quarterback

Personal information
- Born: July 2, 1984 (age 42); Owasso, Oklahoma, U.S.
- Listed height: 6 ft 2 in (1.88 m)
- Listed weight: 208 lb (94 kg)

Career information
- High school: Owasso
- College: Tulsa
- NFL draft: 2008: undrafted

Career history
- Jacksonville Jaguars (2008−2009); Montreal Alouettes (2011)*
- * Offseason or practice squad member only

Awards and highlights
- Wuerffel Trophy (2007); C-USA co-Offensive P.O.Y. (2007); First-team All-C-USA (2007); Second-team All-C-USA (2006); GMAC Bowl MVP (2008); Liberty Bowl MVP (2005)

Paul Smith (born July 2, 1984) is an American former professional gridiron football quarterback. He played college football for the Tulsa Golden Hurricane. Smith was signed by the Jacksonville Jaguars of the National Football League (NFL) as an undrafted free agent in 2008.

== Early life ==
Smith attended Deer Creek High School in Edmond, Oklahoma for two years, then finished high school at Owasso High School in Owasso, Oklahoma. He set a state high school passing record with 9,574 yards in 4 seasons.

== College career ==
Arriving at Tulsa in 2003, Smith played in eight games as a true freshman. He sat out the 2004 season as a redshirt, then became the Golden Hurricane's starting quarterback in 2005. He led Tulsa to a 9–4 record and the Conference USA title. He capped off the 2005 season with a 31–24 win over Fresno State in the 2005 Liberty Bowl (Tulsa's first bowl win since 1991); Smith passed for 234 yards and a touchdown, and also ran for the winning touchdown. Smith was named the game's most valuable player.

In 2006, Smith was tagged as one of Conference USA's top quarterbacks in preseason, along with such players as future Philadelphia Eagles quarterback Kevin Kolb, and was widely recognized as the leader and face of the Tulsa football program. In Tulsa's scheme, Smith threw many screen passes to running backs Tarrion Adams, Courtney Tennial, and wide receiver Idris Moss. The Golden Hurricane jumped out to a stellar 7–1 start with the inside track on a second straight West Division championship, but the team experienced a breakdown amid turmoil resulting from rumors of teams trying to woo away coach Steve Kragthorpe. Tulsa lost its contest against Utah in the Armed Forces Bowl 25–13, making their season record stand at 8–5.

In 2007, Smith led the Golden Hurricane to a 10–4 record and a win in the 2008 GMAC Bowl while also winning the 2007 Conference USA player of the year award In 2007, Smith won the Wuerffel Trophy which goes to the top humanitarian in college football and was a finalist for the Draddy Trophy. He was also selected to play in the 2008 Cornerstone Hula Bowl, where he passed for 47 yards and ran for the game's first two touchdowns for the winning Aina (East) team.

A three-year starter with the Golden Hurricane, Smith threw a combined 83 touchdown passes while taking his team to 3 straight bowl appearances. Smith holds the NCAA record with 14 consecutive games passing for more than 300 yards. Smith also shares in an NCAA record as the only team to have a 5,000 yard passer, three 1,000 yard receivers, and a 1,000 rusher in the same season.

== Professional career ==
=== Jacksonville Jaguars ===
Smith was not selected in the 2008 NFL draft and was signed as an undrafted free agent by the Jacksonville Jaguars on April 28. Jacksonville immediately waived their third-team quarterback, allowing Smith to take his spot on the roster.

On July 31, 2008, Smith was waived by the Jaguars. On August 31, Smith was re-signed to the Jaguars' practice squad. He was waived on August 30, 2009, to make room on the roster for Todd Boeckman.

=== Montreal Alouettes ===
In October 2009, Smith took a position as assistant chaplain at the University of Tulsa, apparently ending his playing career.

After spending the next year out of football and briefly taking a position as a financial consultant, Smith signed a two-year contract with the Montreal Alouettes of the CFL on February 2, 2011. He was released during training camp by the Alouettes.

== See also ==
- List of Division I FBS passing yardage leaders
