= Chris Penn (American football) =

American football player (born 1971)

No. 81, 86, 87, 5
- Position: Wide receiver

Personal information
- Born: April 20, 1971 (age 55); Lenapah, Oklahoma, U.S.
- Listed height: 6 ft 0 in (1.83 m)
- Listed weight: 198 lb (90 kg)

Career information
- College: Tulsa
- NFL draft: 1994: 3rd round, 96th overall pick

Career history
- Kansas City Chiefs (1994–1996); Chicago Bears (1997–1998); San Diego Chargers (1999); Los Angeles Xtreme (2001)

Awards and highlights
- Second-team All-American (1993)

Career NFL statistics
- Receptions: 148
- Receiving yards: 1,945
- Receiving touchdowns: 12
- Stats at Pro Football Reference

Chris Penn (born April 20, 1971) is an American former professional football player who was a wide receiver for six seasons in the National Football League (NFL) with the Kansas City Chiefs, the Chicago Bears, and the San Diego Chargers. He was picked by the Chiefs in the third round of the 1994 NFL draft. He is son to James Penn of Nowata, Oklahoma. Penn attended Northeastern Oklahoma A&M College for two years prior to transferring to University of Tulsa.

== See also ==
- List of NCAA major college football yearly receiving leaders
