= Danny Wuerffel =

American football player (born 1974)

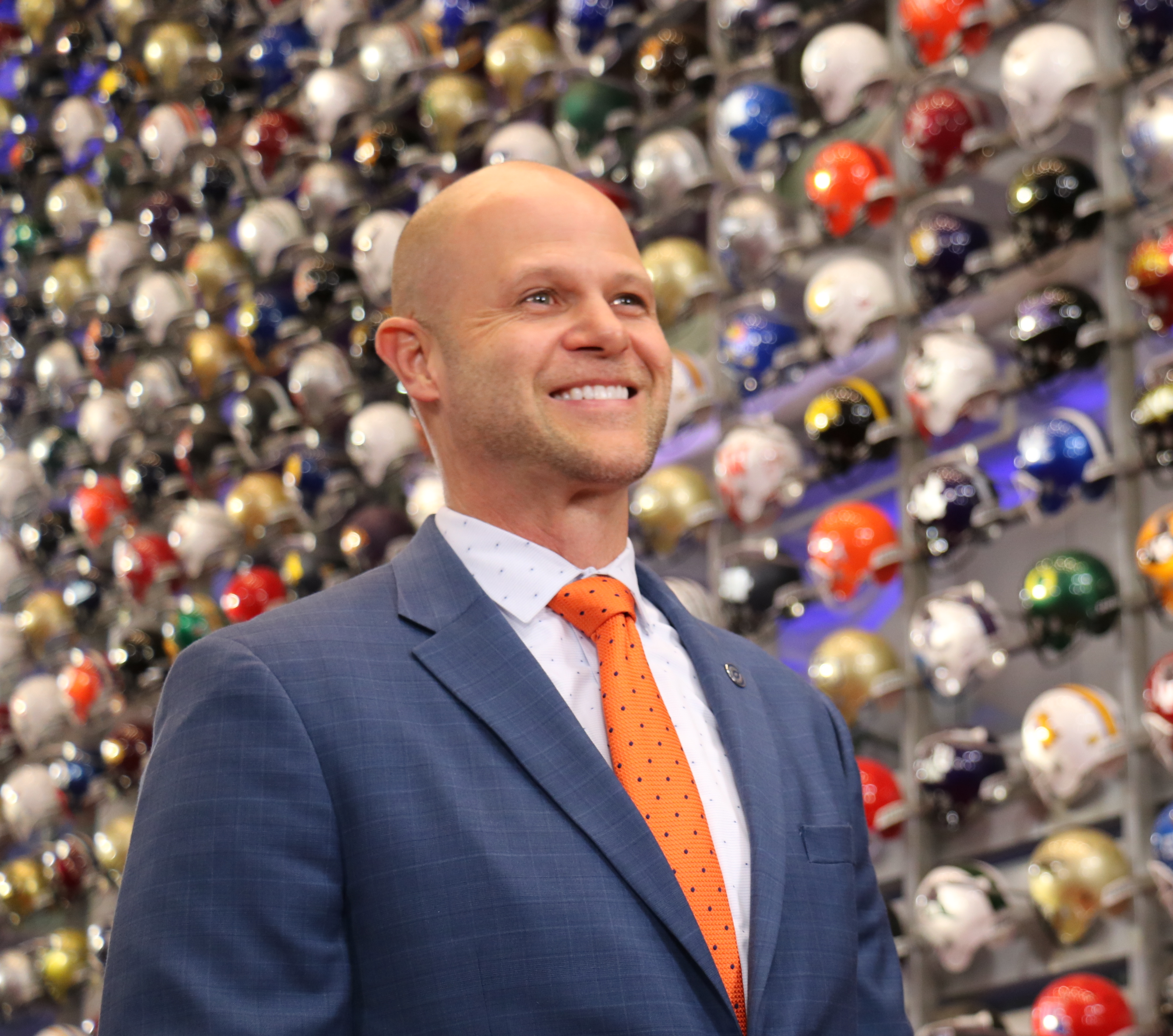
- Wuerffel in 2019

No. 7, 17
- Position: Quarterback

Personal information
- Born: May 27, 1974 (age 52); Fort Walton Beach, Florida, U.S.
- Listed height: 6 ft 1 in (1.85 m)
- Listed weight: 212 lb (96 kg)

Career information
- High school: Fort Walton Beach
- College: Florida (1993–1996)
- NFL draft: 1997: 4th round, 99th overall pick
- Expansion draft: 2002: 1st round, 17th overall pick

Career history
- New Orleans Saints (1997–1999); Rhein Fire (2000); Green Bay Packers (2000); Chicago Bears (2001); Houston Texans (2002)*; Washington Redskins (2002)
- * Offseason or practice squad member only

Awards and highlights
- World Bowl champion (2000); National champion (1996); Heisman Trophy (1996); Consensus All-American (1996); Second-team All-American (1995); 2× NCAA passing touchdowns leader (1995, 1996); NCAA passer rating leader (1995); 2× SEC Male Athlete of the Year (1996, 1997); SEC Freshman of the Year (1993); Florida Football Ring of Honor (2006)

Career NFL statistics
- Passing attempts: 350
- Passing completions: 184
- Completion percentage: 52.6%
- TD–INT: 12–22
- Passing yards: 2,123
- Passer rating: 56.4
- Stats at Pro Football Reference
- College Football Hall of Fame

Daniel Carl Wuerffel (born May 27, 1974) is an American former football quarterback who played college football for the Florida Gators and professional football in the National Football League (NFL). At Florida, he was a prolific passer under head coach Steve Spurrier. Wuerffel led the NCAA in touchdown passes in 1995 and 1996 and set numerous school and conference records during his career. During his senior year in 1996, he won the Heisman Trophy while leading the Gators to their first national championship. In 2013, he was inducted into the College Football Hall of Fame.

After graduating from the University of Florida, he was selected in the 1997 NFL draft by the New Orleans Saints. He spent six years in the league with four teams, including the Green Bay Packers, the Chicago Bears and the Washington Redskins, though his playing time and on-field success in the NFL was limited. Wuerffel also played one season in NFL Europe, where he led the Rhein Fire to a league championship in World Bowl 2000.

After retiring from professional football, Wuerffel returned to New Orleans to work with Desire Street Ministries, a nonprofit organization that seeks to help impoverished neighborhoods through spiritual and community development. Wuerffel had first become involved with the organization while playing for the Saints in the late 1990s, and as the organization attempted to recover from the aftermath of Hurricane Katrina, he became its executive director. Under Wuerffel, Desire Street Ministries moved its headquarters to Atlanta and expanded its programs to other inner cities in the American South.

== Early life ==
Wuerffel was born in Pensacola, Florida, in 1974, the son of a Lutheran minister who was a chaplain in the U.S. Air Force. While he was growing up, his family and he lived in South Carolina, Spain, Nebraska, and Colorado before he attended Fort Walton Beach High School in Fort Walton Beach, Florida.

Wuerffel was a standout high school football and basketball player for the Fort Walton Beach Vikings. In football, he led the Vikings to an undefeated season as a senior quarterback, while winning the Florida Class 4A state football championship in 1991 and earning the number two national ranking in USA Today. Wuerffel was widely considered the top high school football recruit in the state of Florida, and USA Today's high school player of the year in Florida during his senior year. He graduated from high school as his class co-valedictorian.

== College career ==
=== 1993–1994 ===
Wuerffel accepted an athletic scholarship to attend the University of Florida in Gainesville, Florida, where he played quarterback for head coach Steve Spurrier's Florida Gators football team from 1993 to 1996. One of the most decorated players in Florida's football history, he was a key member of the Gators teams that won four consecutive Southeastern Conference titles between 1993 and 1996. Wuerffel graduated from the university with a bachelor's degree in public relations, and was inducted into the University of Florida Athletic Hall of Fame as a "Gator Great" in 2006. On September 30, 2006, Wuerffel was inducted into the Gator Football Ring of Honor alongside his former coach Spurrier and two other former Gator players, Jack Youngblood and Emmitt Smith. Wuerffel was elected to the College Football Hall of Fame in 2013.

The 1993 season was the first in which the Gators were ranked in the AP top 10 every week. In the second week, quarterbacks Wuerffel and Terry Dean throw a total of seven interceptions against Kentucky. With eight seconds left, Wuerffel threw a pass down the middle to walk-on receiver Chris Doering for the game-winning touchdown; Gator play-by-play announcer Mick Hubert shouted, "Doering's got a touchdown!" The next week, Florida recovered and defeated Heath Shuler-led and fifth-ranked Tennessee 41–34 in a "shootout".

=== 1995–1996 ===
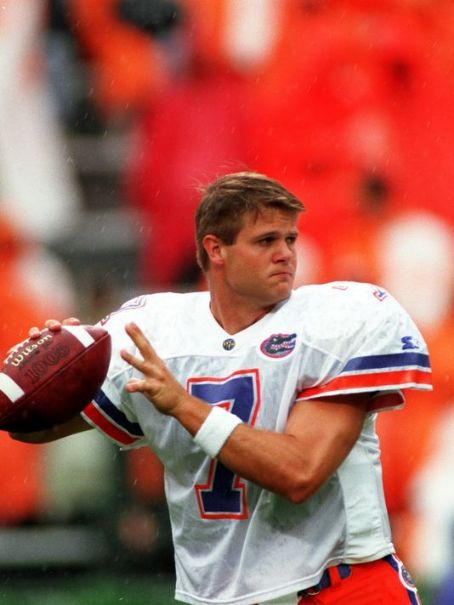
Wuerffel playing for the Florida Gators, October 1996

Wuerffel had split playing time with fellow quarterback Terry Dean for much of the 1993 and 1994 seasons. With Dean graduated, Wuerffel was the clear starter coming into the 1995 season, and he made the most of his opportunity. The Gators went through the regular season undefeated, and Wuerffel set several Southeastern Conference (SEC) and NCAA records for passing, including the SEC season record for touchdown passes and the NCAA record for passing efficiency. Highlights included a September win over rival Tennessee in which Florida rallied from a 30–14 deficit to win 62–37 behind Wuerffel's SEC record 6 touchdown passes. Sports Illustrated had sent a team of reporters to cover the top-10 matchup and had planned to put Tennessee quarterback Peyton Manning on the cover. However, after the Gators' win, they decided to put Wuerffel on the cover instead, bringing him his first major national attention.

He led the Gators to the Bowl Alliance National Championship game following the 1995 season, but ultimately lost 62–24 to the Nebraska Cornhuskers in the Fiesta Bowl. Wuerffel won the 1996 Heisman Trophy, as the outstanding college football player in America, while quarterbacking the Gators into their second consecutive Bowl Alliance national championship game with help from teammates Fred Taylor at running back; Reidel Anthony, Ike Hilliard, and Jacquez Green at wide receiver; and Jeff Mitchell on the offensive line. Wuerffel and the Gators won the 1996 national championship in decisive fashion by defeating the Florida State Seminoles 52–20 in the Sugar Bowl. He led the nation for the second consecutive season in passing touchdowns with 39.

=== Individual awards and honors ===
Wuerffel was a first-team All-American in 1995, and a consensus first-team All-American in 1996. He received the Sammy Baugh Trophy in 1995, the Davey O'Brien Award in 1995 and 1996, and the Johnny Unitas Golden Arm Award in 1996, and was named the Quarterback of the Year by the Touchdown Club of Columbus in 1996. Wuerffel declined to be included on Playboy magazine's All-America team as well as its Scholar-Athlete of the Year award, saying, "That's not the type of person I am or would like to portray myself as." His Gators teammates picked him as the squad's most valuable player in 1995 and 1996; his coaches chose him as one of the Gators' team captains. He was later named to The Gainesville Sun's Florida Gators Team of the Century in 1999, was chosen by the Sun as the number one player in the first 100 years of Gators football, and was listed as a member of the Florida Gators 100th Anniversary Team in 2006.

He is one of only two Heisman Trophy winners to also receive the Draddy Trophy, which is presented annually by the National Football Foundation and the College Football Hall of Fame to the nation's top football scholar-athlete. Wuerffel was also a first-team Academic All-American in 1995 and 1996.

He finished his Gator career by completing 708 of 1,170 passes for 10,875 yards with 114 touchdown passes, the best in SEC history and second-most in major college history. His career pass efficiency rating of 163.56 was the best in major college history and his percentage of passes which went for a touchdown (9.74) ranked first in collegiate history. In 1995, his efficiency rating of 178.4 set a single-season collegiate record. During his Heisman-winning season of 1996, he completed 207 of 360 passes for 3,625 yards (an SEC record at the time) for 39 touchdowns (leading the nation) and his efficiency rating of 170.6 made him the first quarterback to ever post a rating of 170 or better in back-to-back years.

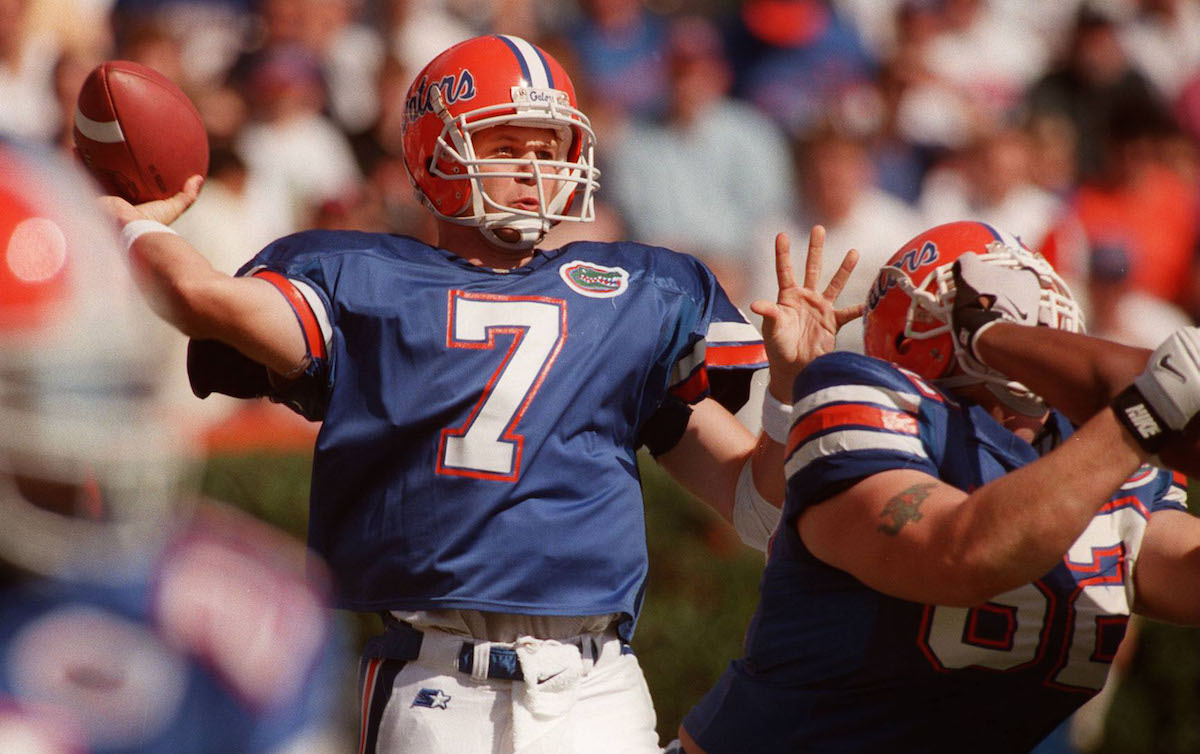
Wuerffel playing for the Florida Gators, November 1996

=== College statistics ===
Season	Team	Passing						
Season	Team	Cmp	Att	Yds	Pct	TD	Int	Rtg
1993	Florida	159	273	2,230	58.2	22	10	146.1
1994	Florida	132	212	1,754	62.3	18	9	151.3
1995	Florida	210	325	3,266	64.6	35	10	178.4
1996	Florida	207	360	3,625	57.5	39	13	170.6
Total		708	1,170	10,875	60.5	114	42	163.6

== Professional career ==
Pre-draft measurables
Height	Weight	Arm length	Hand span	40-yard dash	10-yard split	20-yard split	20-yard shuttle	Vertical jump
6 ft 1 3/4 in (1.87 m)	212 lb (96 kg)	31 1/2 in (0.80 m)	9 1/2 in (0.24 m)	4.90 s	1.68 s	2.85 s	4.42 s	28.0 in (0.71 m)

Wuerffel was considered a "marginal" prospect for the 1997 NFL draft. As such, the New Orleans Saints selected Wuerffel in the fourth round of the 1997 NFL Draft as the third quarterback selected in the draft. He was selected to potentially serve as the number three quarterback, as the team already had Heath Shuler and Jim Everett on the roster under new head coach Mike Ditka. He played for the Saints for three seasons from 1997 to 1999. Wuerffel spent the offseason before the 2000 NFL season with the Rhein Fire in NFL Europa, where he led the team to a league championship and was named MVP of World Bowl 2000. He spent single seasons as a backup with the Green Bay Packers and Chicago Bears in 2000 and 2001. Wuerffel was drafted by the Houston Texans in the 2002 NFL expansion draft, only to be traded to the Washington Redskins a week later, reuniting him with college coach Steve Spurrier. Wuerffel started several games that season, alternating with fellow Florida Gator alumnus Shane Matthews, but was released by the team before the 2003 season, much to the chagrin of Spurrier.

After not being signed by another team in 2003, Wuerffel decided to retire from professional football in February 2004.

== Personal life ==
Wuerffel began work at Desire Street Ministries, a nonprofit, faith-based organization focusing on spiritual and community development in areas of New Orleans.

The All Sports Association of Fort Walton Beach created the Wuerffel Trophy in his honor in 2005. Florida sculptor W. Stanley Proctor created the design which commemorates Danny Wuerffel, "as he prays after a touchdown. It is awarded annually by the All Sports Association of Fort Walton Beach, Florida to the athlete who best exemplifies Wuerffel's character on the field of play and in the classroom.

In June 2011, The Gainesville Sun reported that Wuerffel was suffering from Guillain–Barré syndrome, a disorder of the nervous system, and was undergoing treatment for it.

In 2014, Emerald Bay Country Club in Destin, Florida, hosted the 1st Annual Danny Wuerffel Golf Classic, known as the "Danny Cup". A small stretch of road between the Mid-Bay Bridge and Highway 98 in Destin, still his parents' home, has been dedicated as "Danny Wuerffel Way" by the Florida state legislature.

Wuerffel is currently a motivational speaker, executive director of Desire Street Ministries and maintains a personal website at dannywuerffel.com .

Before the Pickleball craze hit the US, Wuerffel was one of the first celebrity players trying to grow the game. In 2022, Wuerffel hosted his first Picklebowl tournament, a play on the Super Bowl, the event is a Celebrity Pro–am, where a Professional plays with celebrity from their Alma mater. In the first event ever Wuerffel and his teammate Kyle Yates, who was a former UF tennis player, won the event. Yates and Wuerffel successfully defended their Picklebowl title in 2023 in Atlanta at the Intercollegiate Tennis Association.

== See also ==
- List of Florida Gators football All-Americans
- List of Florida Gators in the NFL draft
- List of Heisman Trophy winners
- List of NCAA Division I FBS career passing touchdowns leaders
- List of NCAA Division I FBS career passing yards leaders
- List of NCAA major college football yearly passing leaders
- List of University of Florida alumni
- List of University of Florida Athletic Hall of Fame members
