= 1993 Florida Gators football team =

American college football season

1993 Florida Gators football

SEC champion SEC Eastern Division co-champion Sugar Bowl champion

SEC Championship Game, W 28–13 vs. Alabama

Sugar Bowl, W 41–7 vs. West Virginia
- Conference: Southeastern Conference
- Eastern Division

Ranking
- Coaches: No. 4
- AP: No. 5
- Record: 11–2 (7–1 SEC)
- Head coach: Steve Spurrier (4th season)
- Offensive scheme: Fun and gun
- Defensive coordinator: Ron Zook (3rd season)
- Base defense: 4–4–3
- Home stadium: Ben Hill Griffin Stadium

1993 Southeastern Conference football standings
	Conf.					Overall
Team	W		L		T	W		L		T
Eastern Division
No. 5 Florida x$	7	–	1	–	0	11	–	2	–	0
No. 12 Tennessee* x	7	–	1	–	0	10	–	2	–	0
Kentucky	4	–	4	–	0	6	–	6	–	0
Georgia	2	–	6	–	0	5	–	6	–	0
South Carolina*	2	–	6	–	0	4	–	7	–	0
Vanderbilt*	1	–	7	–	0	4	–	7	–	0
Western Division
No. 4 Auburn†	8	–	0	–	0	11	–	0	–	0
No. 14 Alabama* x	5	–	2	–	1	9	–	3	–	1
Arkansas*	3	–	4	–	1	5	–	5	–	1
LSU	3	–	5	–	0	5	–	6	–	0
Ole Miss*	3	–	5	–	0	5	–	6	–	0
Mississippi State*	2	–	5	–	1	3	–	6	–	2
Championship: Florida 28, Alabama 13
$ – Conference champion; x – Division champion/co-champions; † – Ineligible for the postseason due to NCAA probation. * – Alabama later forfeited all regular-season wins and one tie due to NCAA violations, giving an official record of 1–12 overall and 0–8 SEC. The forfeit of the tie retroactively gave Tennessee a share of the East title.; Rankings from AP Poll

The 1993 Florida Gators football team represented the University of Florida during the 1993 NCAA Division I-A football season. The season was the fourth for Steve Spurrier as the head coach of the Florida Gators football team. The Gators compiled a 10–2 overall record.

The Gators used coach Spurrier's pass-heavy "fun 'n gun" offense". Although the Gators fell short of their hopes for a national championship, the 1993 season marked the first time that they were ranked in the top ten of the Associated Press Poll during every week of the season, and they were ranked fifth in the final AP Poll, following their 41–7 Sugar Bowl victory over the 11-0, 3rd ranked West Virginia Mountaineers.

The 1993 team set a program record for wins in a season.

== Schedule ==
Date	Time	Opponent	Rank	Site	TV	Result	Attendance	Source
September 4	6:00 p.m.	Arkansas State*	No. 8	Ben Hill Griffin Stadium; Gainesville, FL		W 44–6	84,051	
September 11	7:00 p.m.	at Kentucky	No. 7	Commonwealth Stadium; Lexington, KY (rivalry)	PPV	W 24–20	58,175	
September 18	3:30 p.m.	No. 5 Tennessee	No. 9	Ben Hill Griffin Stadium; Gainesville, FL (rivalry)	ABC	W 41–34	85,247	
October 2	12:30 p.m.	Mississippi State	No. 5	Ben Hill Griffin Stadium; Gainesville, FL	JPS	W 38–24	84,738	
October 9	7:30 p.m.	at LSU	No. 5	Tiger Stadium; Baton Rouge, LA (rivalry)	ESPN	W 58–3	60,060	
October 16	2:00 p.m.	at No. 19 Auburn	No. 4	Jordan-Hare Stadium; Auburn, AL (rivalry)		L 35–38	85,284	
October 30	12:00 p.m.	vs. Georgia	No. 10	Gator Bowl; Jacksonville, FL (rivalry)	ABC	W 33–26	80,392	
November 6	1:00 p.m.	Southwestern Louisiana*^{†}	No. 9	Ben Hill Griffin Stadium; Gainesville, FL		W 61–14	83,711	
November 13	12:30 p.m.	at South Carolina	No. 8	Williams–Brice Stadium; Columbia, SC	JPS	W 37–26	70,188	
November 20	1:00 p.m.	Vanderbilt	No. 8	Ben Hill Griffin Stadium; Gainesville, FL	JPS	W 52–0	83,818	
November 27	12:00 p.m.	No. 1 Florida State*	No. 7	Ben Hill Griffin Stadium; Gainesville, FL (rivalry)	ABC	L 21–33	85,507	
December 4	3:30 p.m.	vs. No. 17 Alabama	No. 9	Legion Field; Birmingham, AL (SEC Championship) (rivalry)	ABC	W 28–13	76,345	
January 1, 1994	8:30 p.m.	vs. No. 3 West Virginia*	No. 8	Louisiana Superdome; New Orleans, LA (Sugar Bowl)	ABC	W 41–7	75,437	
*Non-conference game; ^{†}Homecoming; Rankings from AP Poll released prior to the game; All times are in Eastern time; Source:

== Before the season ==
The players' and fans' preseason expectations for the Gators' fourth season under Spurrier were high, and some commentators began to speak openly about the possibility of the Gators making a run for the national title.

== Game summaries ==
=== Arkansas State ===
Team	1	2	3	4	Total
Arkansas St.	6	0	0	0	6
• Florida	3	21	13	7	44

- Date: September 4
- Location: Ben Hill Griffin Stadium, Gainesville, Florida
- Game attendance: 84,051

Scoring summary
1	AS	M. Williams 6-yard run (kick failed)	AS 6-0
1	FLA	Davis 27-yard field goal	AS 6-3
2	FLA	J. Jackson 35-yard pass from Dean (Edmiston kick)	FLA 10-6
2	FLA	Rhett 1-yard run (Davis kick)	FLA 17-6
2	FLA	W. Jackson 40-yard pass from Dean (Edmiston kick)	FLA 24-6
3	FLA	Frazier 29-yard pass from Wuerffel (Davis kick)	FLA 31-6
3	FLA	Houston 20-yard pass from Wuerffel (kick failed)	FLA 37-6
4	FLA	Randolph 6-yard run (Davis kick)	FLA 44-6

The season opened in the Swamp with a 44–6 defeat of Arkansas State.

Arkansas State scored first, but Florida responded with 44 unanswered, including a 35-yard touchdown pass from Terry Dean to Jack Jackson.

=== At Kentucky ===
Florida Gators (1–0) at Kentucky Wildcats

Quarter	1	2	3	4	Total
Florida	3	6	8	7	24
Kentucky	7	0	10	3	20

at Commonwealth Stadium, Lexington, Kentucky

- Date: September 11
- Game weather: Clear, mid-60s
- Game attendance: 58,175

Game information

First quarter

- FLA – Judd Davis 31-yard field goal. Florida 3–0. Drive:
- KY – Alfonzo Browning 3-yard pass from Pookie Jones (Juha Leonoff kick). Kentucky 7–3. Drive:

Second quarter

- FLA – Terry Dean 1-yard run (kick failed). Florida 9–7. Drive:

Third quarter

- KY – Moe Williams 79-yard run (Leonoff kick). Kentucky 14–9. Drive:
- KY – Juha Leonoff 22-yard field goal. Kentucky 17–9. Drive:
- FLA – Chris Doering 19-yard pass from Danny Wuerffel (pass good). Tie 17–17. Drive:

Fourth quarter

- KY – Juha Leonoff 25-yard field goal, 1:23. Kentucky 20–17. Drive:
- FLA – Chris Doering 28-yard pass from Danny Wuerffel (Judd Davis kick), 0:08. Florida 24–20. Drive:

Top passers

- FLA – Terry Dean – 18/30, 150 yards, 4 INT
- KY – Pookie Jones – 5/13, 40 yards, TD, INT

Top rushers

- FLA – Errict Rhett – 21 rushes, 136 yards
- KY – Moe Williams – 9 rushes, 110 yards, TD

Top receivers

- FLA – Chris Doering – 6 receptions, 95 yards, 2 TD
- KY – Troy Hobbs – 1 reception, 16 yards

In the second week of play, Florida managed a close 24–20 win over Kentucky. Quarterbacks Danny Wuerffel and Terry Dean combined to throw a total of seven interceptions.

With eight seconds left, Wuerffel threw a pass down the middle to walk-on receiver Chris Doering for the game-winning touchdown; Gator play-by-play announcer Mick Hubert shouted, "Doering's got a touchdown!"

=== Tennessee ===
Team	1	2	3	4	Total
Tennessee	0	14	6	14	34
• Florida	7	14	10	10	41

- Date: September 18
- Location: Ben Hill Griffin Stadium, Gainesville, Florida
- Game attendance: 85,247

Scoring summary
1	FLA	Hill 8-yard pass from Wuerffel (Davis kick)	FLA 7-0
2	FLA	Doering 17-yard pass from Wuerffel (Davis kick)	FLA 14-0
2	FLA	Rhett 1-yard run (Davis kick)	FLA 21-0
2	TENN	Fleming 54-yard pass from Shuler (Becksvoort kick)	FLA 21-7
2	TENN	B. Williams 41-yard pass from Shuler (Becksvoort kick)	FLA 21-14
3	FLA	Houston 30-yard pass from Wuerffel (Davis kick)	FLA 28-14
3	FLA	Davis 37-yard field goal	FLA 31-14
3	TENN	B. Williams 70-yard pass from Shuler (run failed)	FLA 31-20
4	FLA	Rhett 1-yard run (Davis kick)	FLA 38-20
4	TENN	B. Williams 13-yard pass from Shuler (pass failed)	FLA 38-26
4	FLA	Davis 42-yard field goal	FLA 41-26
4	TENN	Kent 5-yard pass from Shuler (Garner run)	FLA 41-34

In a "shootout" the Gators defeated the Vols by a single touchdown, 41 to 34.

Heath Shuler completed 25 of 41 passes for 355 yards and five touchdowns; and Danny Wuerffel completed 19 of 38 for 231 yards and three touchdowns. Errict Rhett rushed for 147 yards and two touchdowns.

A group of Tennessee fans, including coach Phillip Fulmer's wife, complained to the SEC about the behavior of Gators fans. They claim cups of urine were thrown on them during the game.

=== Mississippi State ===
Team	1	2	3	4	Total
Miss. St.	14	0	7	3	24
• Florida	7	7	17	7	38

- Date: October 2
- Location: Ben Hill Griffin Stadium, Gainesville, Florida
- Game attendance: 84,738

Scoring summary
1	MISSST	C. Jones 52-yard pass from Jordan (Burke kick)	MISSST 7-0
1	FLA	Doering 11-yard pass from Wuerffel (Davis kick)	Tied 7-7
1	MISSST	Bouie 54-yard run (Burke kick)	MISSST 14-7
2	FLA	Doering 13-yard pass from Wuerffel (Davis kick)	Tied 14-14
3	FLA	Davis 46-yard field goal	FLA 17-14
3	MISSST	Moulds 63-yard pass from Jordan (Burke kick)	MISSST 21-17
3	FLA	J. Jackson 100-yard kickoff return (Davis kick)	FLA 24-21
3	FLA	Rhett 5-yard run (Davis kick)	FLA 31-21
4	MISSST	Burke 31-yard field goal	FLA 31-24
4	FLA	Doering 11-yard pass from Wuerffel (Davis kick)	FLA 38-24

The next week saw a 38–24 win over Mississippi State. Wuerffel and Doering teamed up for three touchdown passes.

Down 21–17, Jack Jackson had a 100-yard kickoff return to put the Gators up 24–21.

=== LSU ===
Team	1	2	3	4	Total
• Florida	10	13	21	14	58
LSU	3	0	0	0	3

- Date: October 9
- Location: Tiger Stadium
- Game attendance: 60,060

Scoring summary
Q1	LSU	LaFleur 29 yard field goal	LSU 3-0
Q1	FLA	Davis 19 yard field goal	Tied 3-3
Q1	FLA	J. Jackson 39 yard pass from Wuerffel (Davis kick)	FLA 10-3
Q2	FLA	Houston 16 yard pass from Wuerffel (kick failed)	FLA 16-3
Q2	FLA	W. Jackson 10 yard pass from Wuerffel (Davis kick)	FLA 23-3
Q3	FLA	Houston 35 yard pass from Wuerffel (Davis kick)	FLA 30-3
Q3	FLA	Rhett 15 yard run (Davis kick)	FLA 37-3
Q3	FLA	Palmer 34 yard pass from Dean (Davis kick)	FLA 44-3
Q4	FLA	Mobley 7 yard run (Davis kick)	FLA 51-3
Q4	FLA	Foy 6 yard run (Davis kick)	FLA 58-3

In Baton Rouge, Florida scored 58 unanswered to beat the LSU Tigers 58–3. Wuerffel completed 14 passes for 221 yards and four touchdowns.

It was the largest margin of victory over a road opponent under Spurrier and the worst loss in LSU football history.

=== At Auburn ===
Team	1	2	3	4	Total
Florida	10	17	0	8	35
• Auburn	7	7	7	17	38

- Date: October 16
- Location: Jordan–Hare Stadium, Auburn, Alabama
- Game attendance: 85,214

Scoring summary
1	FLA	Davis 49-yard field goal	FLA 3-0
1	FLA	Jackson 50-yard pass from Wuerffel (Davis kick)	FLA 10-0
1	AUB	C. Jackson 96-yard interception return (Etheridge kick)	FLA 10-7
2	AUB	White 2-yard run (Etheridge kick)	AUB 14-10
2	FLA	Davis 36-yard field goal	AUB 14-13
2	FLA	Rhett 24-yard run (Davis kick)	FLA 20-14
2	FLA	Hill 23-yard pass from Wuerffel (Davis kick)	FLA 27-14
3	AUB	Richardson 23-yard pass from White (Davis kick)	FLA 27-21
4	AUB	Bostic 4-yard run (Etheridge kick)	AUB 28-27
4	AUB	Sanders 9-yard run (Etheridge kick)	AUB 35-27
4	FLA	Jackson 13-yard pass from Wuerffel (Jackson pass from Wuerffel)	Tied 35-35
4	AUB	Etheridge 41-yard field goal	AUB 38-35

Coach Terry Bowden's undefeated Auburn Tigers upset the Gators 38–35. On a cold, drizzling, dreary day in Auburn, the fourth-ranked Gators amassed 560 yards of total offense, including 386 yards passing by quarterback Danny Wuerffel and 196 yards rushing by tailback Errict Rhett.

But the Gators' offensive fireworks were not enough for the win, as Auburn's defense sacked Wuerffel four times and made two key interceptions. The two teams were tied at 35 with 1:21 left in the game, when Tigers placekicker Scott Etheridge booted a 41-yard field to beat the Gators, 38–35. Auburn dropped the Gators to their lowest ranking (10th) of the season.

=== Vs. Georgia ===
Florida Gators vs. Georgia Bulldogs

Quarter	1	2	3	4	Total
Florida	13	10	7	3	33
Georgia	3	17	0	6	26

at Gator Bowl, Jacksonville, Florida

- Date: October 30
- Game weather: Rain
- Game attendance: 80,392

Game information
First quarter
- UF – Davis 29-yard field goal. Florida 3–0.
- UGA – Parkman 22-yard field goal. Tie 3–3.
- UF – Rhett 9-yard run (Davis kick). Florida 10–3.
- UF – Davis 27-yard field goal. Florida 13–3.

Second quarter

- UGA – Hunter 2-yard pass from Zeier (Parkman kick). Florida 13–10.
- UGA – Mitchell 6-yard pass from Zeier (Parkman kick). Georgia 17–13.
- UGA – Parkman 27-yard field goal. Georgia 20–13.
- UF – Davis 36-yard field goal. Georgia 20–16.
- UF – Houston 35-yard pass from Dean (Davis kick). Florida 23–20.

Third quarter

- UF – Rhett 1-yard run (Davis kick). Florida 30–20.

Fourth quarter

- UGA – Parkman 21-yard field goal. Florida 30–23.
- UF – Davis 31-yard field goal. Florida 33–23.
- UGA – Parkman 25-yard field goal. Florida 33–26.

Florida beat rival Georgia 33–26. In constant rain, the usually prolific passing game of coach Steve Spurrier's Gators was stymied. Instead, the Gators relied on tailback Errict Rhett to amass 183 yards and two touchdowns to build a 33–26 fourth-quarter lead.

Led by quarterback Eric Zeier, the Georgia Bulldogs mounted a drive into Florida territory in the final minute and a half. Zeier completed what appeared to be the game-tying touchdown to Jerry Jerman with five seconds remaining in the game.

However, Gators cornerback Anthone Lott had called a timeout just before the ball was snapped, forcing the Bulldogs to play the down again. Lott was called for pass interference on the ensuing play, giving Georgia one last untimed chance to score. Zeier's final pass fell incomplete, and the Gators won a hard-fought, but controversial 33–26 victory.

=== Southwestern Louisiana ===
Team	1	2	3	4	Total
SW Louisiana	0	7	0	7	14
• Florida	14	26	7	14	61

- Date: November 6
- Location: Ben Hill Griffin Stadium, Gainesville, Florida
- Game attendance: 83,711

Scoring summary
1	FLA	Doering 6-yard pass from Dean (Davis kick)	FLA 7-0
1	FLA	J. Jackson 19-yard pass from Dean (Davis kick)	FLA 14-0
2	FLA	Davis 29-yard field goal	FLA 17-0
2	FLA	Safety (Richard downed in endzone)	FLA 19-0
2	FLA	W. Jackson 35-yard pass from Dean (Davis kick)	FLA 26-0
2	FLA	J. Jackson 49-yard pass from Dean (Davis kick)	FLA 33-0
2	FLA	W. Jackson 16-yard pass from Dean (Davis kick)	FLA 40-0
2	SWL	Sensley 57-yard run (Shafer kick)	FLA 40-7
3	FLA	J. Jackson 21-yard pass from Dean (Davis kick)	FLA 47-7
4	FLA	Foy 14-yard run (Davis kick)	FLA 54-7
4	FLA	T. Davis 11-yard pass from Wuerffel (Davis kick)	FLA 61-7
4	SWL	Gasaway 14-yard interception return (Shafer kick)	FLA 61-14

Florida piled up a 61–14 score on the Ragin' Cajuns. Terry Dean burned the Cajun defense for 6 touchdown passes, "one of the most productive halves by a quarterback in UF history."

=== South Carolina ===
Team	1	2	3	4	Total
• Florida	0	20	10	7	37
South Carolina	10	13	3	0	26

- Date: November 13
- Location: Williams-Brice Stadium, Columbia, South Carolina
- Game attendance: 70,188

In Columbia, the Gators beat the South Carolina Gamecocks 37–26. The Gamecocks jumped out to a 17–0 lead, but the Gators cut the lead to 23–20 by halftime.

Down 26–23, Jack Jackson avoided a safety and ran free for 76 yards. After a roughing the passer penalty, Errict Rhett scored and the Gators never relinquished the lead.

=== Vanderbilt ===
Team	1	2	3	4	Total
Vanderbilt	0	0	0	0	0
• Florida	21	10	14	7	52

- Date: November 20
- Location: Ben Hill Griffin Stadium, Gainesville, Florida
- Game attendance: 83,818

Scoring summary
1	FLA	Dean 35-yard pass from Doering (Davis kick)	FLA 7-0
1	FLA	Hill 18-yard pass from Dean (Davis kick)	FLA 14-0
1	FLA	Hill 4-yard pass from Dean (Davis kick)	FLA 21-0
2	FLA	Davis 45-yard field goal	FLA 24-0
2	FLA	J. Jackson 19-yard pass from Wuerffel (Davis kick)	FLA 31-0
3	FLA	Robinson 48-yard fumble return (Davis kick)	FLA 38-0
3	FLA	C. Dean 12-yard pass from T. Dean (Davis kick)	FLA 45-0
4	FLA	Frazier 67-yard pass from Kresser (Davis kick)	FLA 52-0

Florida clinched another SEC east title, shutting out the Vanderbilt Commodores 52–0. The offense sputtered despite the score, but Ron Zook's defense provided the shutout.

=== Florida State ===
Team	1	2	3	4	Total
• FSU	7	6	14	6	33
Florida	0	7	0	14	21

- Date: November 27
- Location: Ben Hill Griffin Stadium, Gainesville, Florida
- Game attendance: 85,507

Scoring summary
1	FSU	Vanover 5-yard pass from Ward (Bentley kick)	FSU 7-0
2	FSU	Bentley 23-yard field goal	FSU 10-0
2	FSU	Bentley 22-yard field goal	FSU 13-0
2	FLA	Jackson 11-yard pass from Wuerffel (Davis kick)	FSU 13-7
3	FSU	McCorvey 7-yard pass (Bentley kick)	FSU 20-7
3	FSU	McCorvey 16-yard pass (Bentley kick)	FSU 27-7
4	FLA	W. Jackson 13-yard pass from Dean (Davis kick)	FSU 27-14
4	FLA	J. Jackson 31-yard pass from Dean (Davis kick)	FSU 27-21
4	FSU	Dunn 79-yard pass from Ward (pass failed)	FSU 33-21

Florida also lost to the national champion and rival Florida State Seminoles 33–21. The Florida offense was stymied early, and Dean subbed for Wuerffel by the second half. The Gators never led, although they had cut the score to 27–21 late.

With just under six minutes left and the crowd roaring, the Seminoles faced third down at its 21-yard-line. Heisman Trophy-winning quarterback Charlie Ward hit freshman running back Warrick Dunn on a drag route, who turned up the sideline for a 79-yard touchdown and a 33–21 FSU win.

=== SEC Championship Game: Alabama ===
Team	1	2	3	4	Total
• Florida	7	7	7	7	28
Alabama	7	3	3	0	13

- Date: December 4
- Location: Legion Field, Birmingham, Alabama
- Game attendance: 76,345

Scoring summary
1	ALA	Lynch 1-yard run (Proctor kick)	ALA 7-0
1	FLA	Houston 13-yard pass from Dean (Davis kick)	Tied 7-7
2	ALA	Proctor 45-yard field goal	ALA 10-7
2	FLA	Dean 2-yard run (Davis kick)	FLA 14-10
3	ALA	Proctor 25-yard field goal	FLA 14-13
3	FLA	J. Jackson 43-yard pass from Dean (Davis kick)	FLA 21-13
4	FLA	Rhett 3-yard run (Davis kick)	FLA 28-13

The Gators finished the regular season with a conference record of 7–1, and in first place among the six teams of the SEC Eastern Division, thus earning a berth in the second SEC Championship Game in Birmingham, Alabama. The Gators were paired against the Alabama Crimson Tide in the championship game—a rematch of the 1992 SEC Championship Game.

The Gators defeated the Crimson Tide 28–13, winning their first SEC Championship Game and their second SEC football championship in three seasons.

=== Sugar Bowl: West Virginia ===
Team	1	2	3	4	Total
• Florida	7	14	14	6	41
West Virginia	7	0	0	0	7

- Date: January 1
- Location: Louisiana Superdome, New Orleans
- Game attendance: 75,437

The Gators then defeated third-ranked West Virginia Mountaineers 41–7 in the Sugar Bowl, finishing fifth in the AP Poll. After a quick touchdown from Jake Kelchner to Jay Kearney to put West Virginia up 7–0 early, the Gators came right back and answered with a touchdown by Errict Rhett to tie the score at 7.

External videos
- 1994 Sugar Bowl, YouTube video.

It seemed the half would end that way, but just before halftime, Gator defensive back Lawrence Wright picked off an errant pass from West Virginia QB Darren Studstill right on the midfield logo. He first made his way to his right side, but when he ran out of blocking help just inside the WVU 40, he turned around and backtracked, circling back to the 45 before finding some running room, and he sprinted into the end zone from there to cap a 51-yard interception return touchdown. That put Florida up 14–7, and crushed the Mountaineers' competitive spirit, as Florida's defense proceeded to force a quick three and out, which gave Terry Dean time to connect with Jack Jackson for a 39-yard touchdown to make it 21–7 at halftime.

From there, the Gators cruised in the second half. Errict Rhett ran in two more touchdowns and Judd Davis added two insurance field goals in the fourth quarter to make the final score a convincing 41–7.

== Roster ==
1993 Florida Gators football team roster
Players
Coaches
Offense

Pos.	#	Name	Class
RB		Chris Bilkie
WR		Paul Bowen
TE		Chris Braun
OL		Gantt Crouch
RB		Tony Davis
TE		Charlie Dean
QB	12	Terry Dean	Jr
WR	28	Chris Doering (W)	So
RB		Jerome Evans
RB		Terrence Foy
WR		Daryl Frazier
OL		Dean Golden
OT		Reggie Green
WR		Aubrey Hill
WR		Harrison Houston (C)
WR	1	Jack Jackson	So
WR	22	Willie Jackson	Sr
TE		Greg Keller
WR		Larry Kennedy
QB	15	Eric Kresser	Fr
G	71	Jeff Mitchell	Fr
RB		Dwayne Mobley
WR		David Nabavi
TE		Shawn Nunn
OT	74	Jason Odom	So
WR		Sorola Palmer
RB		Kelvin Randolph
RB	33	Errict Rhett (C)	Sr
OL		David Swain
OL		Jim Watson
QB		Adam Whitehurst
QB	17	Danny Wuerffel	Fr

Defense

Pos.	#	Name	Class
DT		David Barnard	So
DT	67	Mark Campbell	So
LB		James Bates
DL		Mark Campbell
DE	57	Kevin Carter	Jr
LB		Dexter Daniels
DT	94	William Gaines (C)	Sr
DB		Michael Gilmore
DB		Monty Grow
LB		Ben Hanks
DT	61	Ellis Johnson	Jr
CB		Larry Kennedy
CB	9	Anthone Lott
DL		Henry McMillian
LB		Ed Robinson (C)
DB		Shea Showers
S		Lawrence Wright	Fr
DB	20	Sammy McCorkle	So

Special teams

Pos.	#	Name	Class
K		Judd Davis
P		Shayne Edge
K		Bart Edmiston
K		Ryan Ruland

Head coach

- Steve Spurrier

Coordinators/assistant coaches

- Ron Zook (DC/DB)
- Charlie Strong (DE)

Legend

- (C) Team captain
- (S) Suspended
- (I) Ineligible
- Injured
- Redshirt

== Awards ==
Halfback Errict Rhett, offensive tackle Reggie Green, and defensive tackle William Gaines were first-team All-SEC. Placekicker Judd Davis won the Lou Groza Award.
