= 1993 Georgia Bulldogs football team =

American college football season

1993 Georgia Bulldogs football
- Conference: Southeastern Conference
- Eastern Division
- Record: 5–6 (2–6 SEC)
- Head coach: Ray Goff (5th season)
- Offensive coordinator: Wayne McDuffie (3rd season)
- Offensive scheme: No-huddle spread
- Defensive coordinator: Richard Bell (5th season)
- Base defense: 3–4
- Home stadium: Sanford Stadium

1993 Southeastern Conference football standings
| | Conf. | | | | | Overall |
| Team | W | | L | | T | W | | L | | T |
|---|---|---|---|---|---|---|---|---|---|---|
Eastern Division
| No. 5 Florida x$ | 7 | – | 1 | – | 0 | 11 | – | 2 | – | 0 |
| No. 12 Tennessee* x | 7 | – | 1 | – | 0 | 10 | – | 2 | – | 0 |
| Kentucky | 4 | – | 4 | – | 0 | 6 | – | 6 | – | 0 |
| Georgia | 2 | – | 6 | – | 0 | 5 | – | 6 | – | 0 |
| South Carolina* | 2 | – | 6 | – | 0 | 4 | – | 7 | – | 0 |
| Vanderbilt* | 1 | – | 7 | – | 0 | 4 | – | 7 | – | 0 |
Western Division
| No. 4 Auburn† | 8 | – | 0 | – | 0 | 11 | – | 0 | – | 0 |
| No. 14 Alabama* x | 5 | – | 3 | – | 0 | 9 | – | 4 | – | 0 |
| Arkansas* | 3 | – | 4 | – | 1 | 5 | – | 5 | – | 1 |
| LSU | 3 | – | 5 | – | 0 | 5 | – | 6 | – | 0 |
| Ole Miss* | 3 | – | 5 | – | 0 | 5 | – | 6 | – | 0 |
| Mississippi State* | 2 | – | 5 | – | 1 | 3 | – | 6 | – | 2 |
Championship: Florida 28, Alabama 13
$ – Conference champion; x – Division champion/co-champions; † – Ineligible for the postseason due to NCAA probation. * – Alabama later forfeited all regular-season wins and one tie due to NCAA violations, giving an official record of 1–12 overall and 0–8 SEC. The forfeit of the tie retroactively gave Tennessee a share of the East title.; Rankings from AP Poll

The 1993 Georgia Bulldogs football team represented the University of Georgia as a member of the Eastern Division of the Southeastern Conference (SEC) during the 1993 NCAA Division I-A football season. Led by fifth-year head coach Ray Goff, the Bulldogs compiled an overall record of 5–6, with a mark of 2–6 in conference play, tying for fourth in the SEC Eastern Division.

== Schedule ==
| Date | Time | Opponent | Rank | Site | TV | Result | Attendance | Source |
|---|---|---|---|---|---|---|---|---|
| September 4 | 12:30 p.m. | South Carolina | No. 14 | Sanford Stadium; Athens, GA (rivalry) | JPS | L 21–23 | 84,912 | |
| September 11 | 7:30 p.m. | at No. 11 Tennessee | No. 21 | Neyland Stadium; Knoxville, TN (rivalry) | ESPN | L 6–38 | 96,228 | |
| September 18 | 1:00 p.m. | Texas Tech* | | Sanford Stadium; Athens, GA | | W 52–37 | 74,511 | |
| September 25 | 7:00 p.m. | at Ole Miss | | Vaught–Hemingway Stadium; Oxford, MS | | L 14–31 | 38,000 | |
| October 2 | 1:00 p.m. | Arkansas | | Sanford Stadium; Athens, GA | | L 10–20 | 73,825 | |
| October 9 | 1:00 p.m. | Southern Miss* | | Sanford Stadium; Athens, GA | | W 54–24 | 63,458 | |
| October 16 | 2:00 p.m. | at Vanderbilt | | Vanderbilt Stadium; Nashville, TN (rivalry) | | W 41–3 | 28,554 | |
| October 23 | 12:30 p.m. | Kentucky^{†} | | Sanford Stadium; Athens, GA | JPS | W 33–28 | 81,307 | |
| October 30 | 12:00 p.m. | vs. No. 9 Florida | | Gator Bowl; Jacksonville, FL (rivalry) | ABC | L 26–33 | 80,392 | |
| November 13 | 1:00 p.m. | No. 7 Auburn | | Sanford Stadium; Athens, GA (rivalry) | | L 28–42 | 85,434 | |
| November 25 | 11:00 a.m. | at Georgia Tech* | | Bobby Dodd Stadium; Atlanta, GA (rivalry) | ABC | W 43–10 | 46,018 | |
*Non-conference game; ^{†}Homecoming; Rankings from AP Poll released prior to the game; All times are in Eastern time

== Roster ==
1993 Georgia Bulldogs football team roster
Players
Coaches
Offense

| Pos. | # | Name | Class |
|---|---|---|---|
| RB | | Derrington Abnar |
| WR | | Brian Bohannon | Sr |
| RB | | Sterling Boyd |
| OL | | Scott Brownholtz |
| OL | | Chad Chosewood |
| RB | | Terrell Davis |
| OL | | Mike Fellows |
| RB | | Earl Fouch |
| RB | | Larry Fouch |
| WR | | Mason Graham |
| WR | | Robert Greene |
| TE | | Maurice Harrell |
| RB | 7 | Frank Harvey | Sr |
| WR | | Brice Hunter |
| WR | | Jerry Jerman |
| OL | | Adam Meadows |
| TE | | Shannon Mitchell |
| RB | | Bill Montgomery |
| QB | | Neil Patel | Jr |
| OL | | Steve Roberts |
| QB | | Brian Smith |
| OL | | Troy Stark |
| OL | | Paul Taylor |
| WR | | Jeff Thomas |
| RB | | Mike Thornton |
| TE | | James Warner |
| OL | | David Weeks |
| OL | | Bernard Williams |
| QB | 10 | Eric Zeier |

Defense

| Pos. | # | Name | Class |
|---|---|---|---|
| DL | | Herman Bell |
| LB | | Carlo Butler |
| LB | | Charlie Clemons |
| DL | | Phillip Daniels |
| LB | | Mitch Davis |
| LB | | Randall Godfrey |
| LB | | Bryan Jones |
| DB | | Will Muschamp |
| DB | | Buster Owens |
| DB | | Charles Pledger |
| DL | | Bill Rosenberg |
| DL | | Walter Rouse |
| DL | | Derrick Smith |
| DL | | Matt Storm |
| DB | | Ralph Thompson |
| DB | | Greg Tremble |
| DB | | Chris Wilson |
| DB | | Carlos Yancy |
| DB | | Walter Jones |

Special teams

| Pos. | # | Name | Class |
|---|---|---|---|
| P | | Scot Armstrong |
| K | | Kanon Parkman |
| P | | Brett Pellock |

Head coach

- Ray Goff

Coordinators/assistant coaches

Legend

- (C) Team captain
- (S) Suspended
- (I) Ineligible
- Injured
- Redshirt
