= 1993 Arkansas Razorbacks football team =

American college football season

1993 Arkansas Razorbacks football
- Conference: Southeastern Conference
- Western Division
- Record: 6–4–1 (4–3–1 SEC)
- Head coach: Danny Ford (1st season)
- Offensive coordinator: Greg Davis (2nd season)
- Defensive coordinator: Joe Kines (3rd season)
- Captains: Kirk Botkin; Tyrone Chatman
- Home stadium: Razorback Stadium; War Memorial Stadium

1993 Southeastern Conference football standings
	Conf.					Overall
Team	W		L		T	W		L		T
Eastern Division
No. 5 Florida x$	7	–	1	–	0	11	–	2	–	0
No. 12 Tennessee* x	7	–	1	–	0	10	–	2	–	0
Kentucky	4	–	4	–	0	6	–	6	–	0
Georgia	2	–	6	–	0	5	–	6	–	0
South Carolina*	2	–	6	–	0	4	–	7	–	0
Vanderbilt*	1	–	7	–	0	4	–	7	–	0
Western Division
No. 4 Auburn†	8	–	0	–	0	11	–	0	–	0
No. 14 Alabama* x	5	–	2	–	1	9	–	3	–	1
Arkansas*	3	–	4	–	1	5	–	5	–	1
LSU	3	–	5	–	0	5	–	6	–	0
Ole Miss*	3	–	5	–	0	5	–	6	–	0
Mississippi State*	2	–	5	–	1	3	–	6	–	2
Championship: Florida 28, Alabama 13
$ – Conference champion; x – Division champion/co-champions; † – Ineligible for the postseason due to NCAA probation. * – Alabama later forfeited all regular-season wins and one tie due to NCAA violations, giving an official record of 1–12 overall and 0–8 SEC. The forfeit of the tie retroactively gave Tennessee a share of the East title.; Rankings from AP Poll

The 1993 Arkansas Razorbacks football team represented the University of Arkansas as a member of the Western Division of the Southeastern Conference (SEC) during the 1993 NCAA Division I-A football season. The team was led by Danny Ford in his first season and finished compiled an overall record of 6–4–1, with a mark of 4–3–1 in conference play, and finished in third place in the SEC Western Division.

== Schedule ==
Date	Time	Opponent	Site	TV	Result	Attendance	Source
September 4	7:00 p.m.	at SMU*	Cotton Bowl; Dallas, TX		W 10–6	26,163	
September 11	2:00 p.m.	No. 19 South Carolina	Razorback Stadium; Fayetteville, AR	PPV	W 18–17	47,321	
September 18	11:30 a.m.	at No. 2 Alabama	Bryant–Denny Stadium; Tuscaloosa AL	JPS	W 3–43 (Alabama forfeit)	70,123	
September 25	3:00 p.m.	Memphis State*	War Memorial Stadium; Little Rock, AR		L 0–6	51,733	
October 2	12:00 p.m.	at No. 24 Georgia	Sanford Stadium; Athens, GA		W 20–10	73,825	
October 9	11:30 a.m.	No. 11 Tennessee	War Memorial Stadium; Little Rock, AR	JPS	L 14–28	54,150	
October 16	11:30 a.m.	at Ole Miss	Mississippi Veterans Memorial Stadium; Jackson, MS (rivalry)	JPS	L 0–19	37,000	
October 30	2:00 p.m.	No. 9 Auburn	Razorback Stadium; Fayetteville, AR		L 21–31	50,100	
November 6	3:00 p.m.	Mississippi State	War Memorial Stadium; Little Rock, AR		T 13–13	50,075	
November 13	2:00 p.m.	Tulsa*	Razorback Stadium; Fayetteville, AR		W 24–11	28,525	
November 27	2:00 p.m.	at LSU	Tiger Stadium; Baton Rouge, LA (rivalry)	ESPN	W 42–24	54,239	
*Non-conference game; Rankings from AP Poll released prior to the game; All times are in Central time

== Roster ==
1993 Arkansas Razorbacks football team roster
Players			Coaches
Offense: Pos. / # / Name / Class; QB / / Barry Lunney / So	Defense: Pos. / # / Name / Class	Special teams: Pos. / # / Name / Class	Head coach: Danny Ford; Coordinators/assistant coaches Legend: (C) Team captain; (S) Suspended; (I) Ineligible; Injured; Redshirt
