= 1993 Mississippi State Bulldogs football team =

American college football season

1993 Mississippi State Bulldogs football
- Conference: Southeastern Conference
- Western Division
- Record: 4–5–2 (3–4–1 SEC)
- Head coach: Jackie Sherrill (3rd season)
- Offensive coordinator: Bruce Arians (1st season)
- Defensive coordinator: Bill Clay (3rd season)
- Home stadium: Scott Field

1993 Southeastern Conference football standings
	Conf.					Overall
Team	W		L		T	W		L		T
Eastern Division
No. 5 Florida x$	7	–	1	–	0	11	–	2	–	0
No. 12 Tennessee* x	7	–	1	–	0	10	–	2	–	0
Kentucky	4	–	4	–	0	6	–	6	–	0
Georgia	2	–	6	–	0	5	–	6	–	0
South Carolina*	2	–	6	–	0	4	–	7	–	0
Vanderbilt*	1	–	7	–	0	4	–	7	–	0
Western Division
No. 4 Auburn†	8	–	0	–	0	11	–	0	–	0
No. 14 Alabama* x	5	–	3	–	0	9	–	4	–	0
Arkansas*	3	–	4	–	1	5	–	5	–	1
LSU	3	–	5	–	0	5	–	6	–	0
Ole Miss*	3	–	5	–	0	5	–	6	–	0
Mississippi State*	2	–	5	–	1	3	–	6	–	2
Championship: Florida 28, Alabama 13
$ – Conference champion; x – Division champion/co-champions; † – Ineligible for the postseason due to NCAA probation. * – Alabama later forfeited all regular-season wins and one tie due to NCAA violations, giving an official record of 1–12 overall and 0–8 SEC. The forfeit of the tie retroactively gave Tennessee a share of the East title.; Rankings from AP Poll

The 1993 Mississippi State Bulldogs football team represented Mississippi State University during the 1993 NCAA Division I-A football season. The team's head coach was Jackie Sherrill. The Bulldogs played their home games at Scott Field in Starkville, Mississippi. The NCAA later adjusted the Bulldogs' record to 4–5–2 after making Alabama forfeit 8 games in the 1993 season.

== Schedule ==
Date	Time	Opponent	Rank	Site	TV	Result	Attendance	Source
September 4	6:00 p.m.	Memphis State*	No. 23	Scott Field; Starkville, MS		L 35–45	38,669	
September 11	2:30 p.m.	LSU		Scott Field; Starkville, MS (rivalry)	ABC	L 16–18	33,324	
September 25	7:00 p.m.	at Tulane*		Louisiana Superdome; New Orleans, LA		W 36–10	28,580	
October 2	11:30 a.m.	at No. 5 Florida		Ben Hill Griffin Stadium; Gainesville, FL	JPS	L 24–38	84,738	
October 9	1:00 p.m.	at No. 22 Auburn		Jordan-Hare Stadium; Auburn, AL		L 17–31	84,222	
October 16	6:00 p.m.	South Carolina		Scott Field; Starkville, MS	PPV	W 23–0	33,915	
October 23	6:00 p.m.	Arkansas State*		Scott Field; Starkville, MS		T 15–15	33,878	
October 30	1:00 p.m.	Kentucky		Scott Field; Starkville, MS		L 17–26	28,607	
November 6	3:00 p.m.	at No. 18 Arkansas		War Memorial Stadium; Little Rock, AR		T 13–13	50,075	
November 13	2:30 p.m.	at No. 12 Alabama		Bryant–Denny Stadium; Tuscaloosa, AL (rivalry)	ABC	W 25–36 (Alabama forfeit)	70,123	
November 27	1:30 p.m.	Ole Miss		Scott Field; Starkville, MS (Egg Bowl)		W 20–13	40,328	
*Non-conference game; Rankings from AP Poll released prior to the game; All times are in Central time

== Season summary ==
=== Ole Miss ===
External videos
- Bulldog Rewind – 1993 vs. Ole Miss

== Personnel ==
1993 Mississippi State Bulldogs football team roster
Players
Coaches
Offense

Pos.	#	Name	Class
QB	14	Todd Jordan	Sr
WR	1	Eric Moulds

Defense

Pos.	#	Name	Class

Special teams

Pos.	#	Name	Class

Head coach

- Jackie Sherrill

Coordinators/assistant coaches

Legend

- (C) Team captain
- (S) Suspended
- (I) Ineligible
- Injured
- Redshirt
