= 1993 Auburn Tigers football team =

American college football season

1993 Auburn Tigers football

National champion (NCF)
- Conference: Southeastern Conference
- Western Division

Ranking
- AP: No. 4
- Record: 11–0 (8–0 SEC)
- Head coach: Terry Bowden (1st season)
- Offensive coordinator: Tommy Bowden (3rd season)
- Defensive coordinator: Wayne Hall (8th season)
- Home stadium: Jordan–Hare Stadium

1993 Southeastern Conference football standings
	Conf.					Overall
Team	W		L		T	W		L		T
Eastern Division
No. 5 Florida x$	7	–	1	–	0	11	–	2	–	0
No. 12 Tennessee* x	7	–	1	–	0	10	–	2	–	0
Kentucky	4	–	4	–	0	6	–	6	–	0
Georgia	2	–	6	–	0	5	–	6	–	0
South Carolina*	2	–	6	–	0	4	–	7	–	0
Vanderbilt*	1	–	7	–	0	4	–	7	–	0
Western Division
No. 4 Auburn†	8	–	0	–	0	11	–	0	–	0
No. 14 Alabama* x	5	–	3	–	0	9	–	4	–	0
Arkansas*	3	–	4	–	1	5	–	5	–	1
LSU	3	–	5	–	0	5	–	6	–	0
Ole Miss*	3	–	5	–	0	5	–	6	–	0
Mississippi State*	2	–	5	–	1	3	–	6	–	2
Championship: Florida 28, Alabama 13
$ – Conference champion; x – Division champion/co-champions; † – Ineligible for the postseason due to NCAA probation. * – Alabama later forfeited all regular-season wins and one tie due to NCAA violations, giving an official record of 1–12 overall and 0–8 SEC. The forfeit of the tie retroactively gave Tennessee a share of the East title.; Rankings from AP Poll

The 1993 Auburn Tigers football team represented Auburn University in the 1993 NCAA Division I-A football season. Under first-year head coach Terry Bowden, the team went undefeated with a record of 11–0 and finished No. 4 in the AP poll. Due to NCAA probation, Auburn was banned from TV and post-season play, and suffered reduced scholarships. The post-season ban prevented Auburn from playing the SEC Championship and a bowl game. Nonetheless, Auburn beat both Florida and Alabama, the two teams that played in the SEC Championship game, and was the only major college football team to finish the season undefeated. The Seattle Times Poll, Harry Frye, Sparks Achievement Ratings, Nutshell Sports Football Ratings, David Wilson and the National Championship Foundation all recognized Auburn as national champions. Auburn did not formally recognize this title until 2025.

== Schedule ==
Date	Time	Opponent	Rank	Site	Result	Attendance	Source
September 2	6:30 p.m.	Ole Miss		Jordan-Hare Stadium; Auburn, AL (rivalry)	W 16–12	78,246	
September 11	6:00 p.m.	Samford*		Jordan-Hare Stadium; Auburn, AL	W 35–7	68,936	
September 18	7:00 p.m.	at LSU		Tiger Stadium; Baton Rouge, LA (rivalry)	W 34–10	71,936	
September 25	1:00 p.m.	Southern Miss*	No. 25	Jordan-Hare Stadium; Auburn, AL	W 35–24	83,476	
October 2	7:00 p.m.	at Vanderbilt	No. 23	Vanderbilt Stadium; Nashville, TN	W 14–10	40,527	
October 9	1:00 p.m.	Mississippi State	No. 22	Jordan-Hare Stadium; Auburn, AL	W 31–17	84,222	
October 16	1:00 p.m.	No. 4 Florida	No. 19	Jordan-Hare Stadium; Auburn, AL (rivalry)	W 38–35	85,214	
October 30	2:00 p.m.	at Arkansas	No. 9	Razorback Stadium; Fayetteville, AR	W 31–21	50,100	
November 6	1:00 p.m.	New Mexico State*^{†}	No. 8	Jordan-Hare Stadium; Auburn, AL	W 55–14	82,128	
November 13	12:00 p.m.	at Georgia	No. 7	Sanford Stadium; Athens, GA (rivalry)	W 42–28	85,434	
November 20	1:00 p.m.	No. 11 Alabama	No. 6	Jordan-Hare Stadium; Auburn, AL (Iron Bowl)	W 22–14	85,214	
*Non-conference game; ^{†}Homecoming; Rankings from AP Poll released prior to the game; All times are in Central time

== Rankings ==
Ranking movements Legend: ██ Increase in ranking ██ Decrease in ranking — = Not ranked
	Week																
Poll	Pre	1	2	3	4	5	6	7	8	9	10	11	12	13	14	15	Final
AP	—	—	—	—	25	23	22	19	10	8	7	6	5	3	4	5	4

== Game summaries ==
=== Ole Miss ===
Team	1	2	3	4	Total
Ole Miss	0	0	0	12	12
• Auburn	3	10	3	0	16

- Date: September 2
- Location: Jordan–Hare Stadium, Auburn, Alabama
- Game attendance: 78,246

Scoring summary
1	AUB	Etheridge 27-yard field goal	AUB 3-0
2	AUB	Bostic 3-yard run (Etheridge kick)	AUB 10-0
2	AUB	Etheridge 37-yard field goal	AUB 13-0
3	AUB	Etheridge 28-yard field goal	AUB 16-0
4	MIS	Thomas 47-yard pass from Adams (Adams pass failed)	AUB 16-6
4	MIS	Fisher 77-yard punt return (Adams pass failed)	AUB 16-12

=== At LSU ===
Team	1	2	3	4	Total
• Auburn	0	21	7	6	34
LSU	7	0	0	3	10

- Date: September 18
- Location: Tiger Stadium, Baton Rouge, Louisiana
- Game attendance: 71,936

Scoring summary
1	LSU	Ray 10-yard pass from Howard (LaFleur kick)	LSU 7-0
2	AUB	White 1-yard run (Etheridge kick)	Tied 7-7
2	AUB	Bostic 13-yard run (Etheridge kick)	AUB 14-7
2	AUB	Bailey 53-yard pass from White (Etheridge kick)	AUB 21-7
3	AUB	White 1-yard run (Etheridge kick)	AUB 28-7
4	LSU	LaFleur 22-yard field goal	AUB 28-10
4	AUB	Etheridge 24-yard field goal	AUB 31-10
4	AUB	Etheridge 36-yard field goal	AUB 34-10

=== At Vanderbilt ===
Team	1	2	3	4	Total
• Auburn	7	0	0	7	14
Vanderbilt	0	10	0	0	10

- Date: October 2
- Location: Vanderbilt Stadium, Nashville, Tennessee
- Game attendance: 40,527

Scoring summary
1	AUB	Robinson 45-yard interception return (Etheridge kick)	AUB 7-0
2	VAN	Love 1-yard run (Yenner kick)	Tied 7-7
2	VAN	Yenner 53-yard field goal	VAN 10-7
4	AUB	Bostic 2-yard run (Etheridge kick)	AUB 14-10

=== Florida ===
Team	1	2	3	4	Total
Florida	10	17	0	8	35
• Auburn	7	7	7	17	38

- Date: October 16
- Location: Jordan–Hare Stadium, Auburn, Alabama
- Game attendance: 85,214

Scoring summary
1	FLA	Davis 49-yard field goal	FLA 3-0
1	FLA	Jackson 50-yard pass from Wuerffel (Davis kick)	FLA 10-0
1	AUB	C. Jackson 96-yard interception return (Etheridge kick)	FLA 10-7
2	AUB	White 2-yard run (Etheridge kick)	AUB 14-10
2	FLA	Davis 36-yard field goal	AUB 14-13
2	FLA	Rhett 24-yard run (Davis kick)	FLA 20-14
2	FLA	Hill 23-yard pass from Wuerffel (Davis kick)	FLA 27-14
3	AUB	Richardson 23-yard pass from White (Davis kick)	FLA 27-21
4	AUB	Bostic 4-yard run (Etheridge kick)	AUB 28-27
4	AUB	Sanders 9-yard run (Etheridge kick)	AUB 35-27
4	FLA	Jackson 13-yard pass from Wuerffel (Jackson pass from Wuerffel)	Tied 35-35
4	AUB	Etheridge 41-yard field goal	AUB 38-35

=== At Arkansas ===
Team	1	2	3	4	Total
• Auburn	7	0	10	14	31
Arkansas	7	0	7	0	14

- Date: October 30
- Location: Razorback Stadium, Fayetteville, Arkansas
- Game attendance: 50,100

Scoring summary
1	ARK	Malone 4-yard run (Boulware kick)	ARK 7-0
1	AUB	White 1-yard run (Etheridge kick)	Tied 7-7
3	AUB	Robinson 35-yard interception return (Etheridge kick)	AUB 14-7
3	AUB	Etheridge field goal	AUB 17-7
3	ARK	Meaders 50-yard pass from Lunney (Boulware kick)	AUB 17-14
4	AUB	Bostic 12-yard run (Etheridge kick)	AUB 24-14
4	AUB	McMilion 16-yard run (Etheridge kick)	AUB 31-14

=== At Georgia ===
Team	1	2	3	4	Total
• Auburn	7	14	14	7	42
Georgia	7	0	7	14	28

- Date: November 13
- Location: Sanford Stadium, Athens, Georgia
- Game attendance: 85,434

Scoring summary
1	AUB	Richardson 28-yard run (Etheridge kick)	AUB 7-0
1	UGA	Davis 1-yard run (Parkman kick)	Tied 7-7
2	AUB	Bostic 41-yard run (Etheridge kick)	AUB 14-7
2	AUB	Bostic 3-yard run (Etheridge kick)	AUB 21-7
3	AUB	Shelling 73-yard interception return (Etheridge kick)	AUB 28-7
3	UGA	Graham 76-yard pass from Zeier (Parkman kick)	AUB 28-14
3	AUB	Sanders 10-yard pass from White (Etheridge kick)	AUB 35-14
4	UGA	Hunter 4-yard pass from Zeier (Parkman kick)	AUB 35-21
4	UGA	Bohannon 8-yard pass from Zeier (Parkman kick)	AUB 35-28
4	AUB	Bostic 26-yard run (Etheridge kick)	AUB 42-28

=== Alabama ===
Team	1	2	3	4	Total
Alabama	0	14	0	0	14
• Auburn	3	2	7	10	22

- Date: November 20
- Location: Jordan–Hare Stadium, Auburn, Alabama
- Game attendance: 85,214

Scoring summary
1	AUB	Etheridge 23-yard field goal	AUB 3-0
2	ALA	Lee 63-yard run (Proctor kick)	ALA 7-3
2	AUB	Barker sacked by Miska for safety	ALA 7-5
2	ALA	Anderson 19-yard run (Proctor kick)	ALA 14-5
3	AUB	Sanders 35-yard pass from Nix (Etheridge kick)	ALA 14-12
4	AUB	Etheridge 26-yard field goal	AUB 15-14
4	AUB	Bostic 70-yard run (Etheridge kick)	AUB 22-14

== Roster ==
1993 Auburn Tigers football team roster
Players
Coaches
Offense

Pos.	#	Name	Class
WR	18	Thomas Bailey	Jr
RB	33	James Bostic	Jr
RB	48	Stephen Davis	So
OT	74	Wayne Gandy	Sr
QB	9	Clay Helton	Jr
TB	12	Harold Morrow	So
QB	10	Patrick Nix	So
OT	65	Anthony Redmon	Sr
FB	40	Tony Richardson	Sr
WR	81	Frank Sanders	Jr
QB	11	Stan White	Sr

Defense

Pos.	#	Name	Class
CB	8	Calvin Jackson	So
S	4	Chris Shelling	Jr
DE	90	Willie Whitehead	Jr
FS	31	Anthony G. Perkins	So

Special teams

Pos.	#	Name	Class
LS	62	Brian Brinsfield	Jr
K	43	Scott Etheridge	Sr

Head coach

- Terry Bowden

Coordinators/assistant coaches

- Jimbo Fisher – Quarterbacks

Legend

- (C) Team captain
- (S) Suspended
- (I) Ineligible
- Injured
- Redshirt

Roster
