= 1993 Vanderbilt Commodores football team =

American college football season

1993 Vanderbilt Commodores football
- Conference: Southeastern Conference
- Eastern Division
- Record: 4–7 (1–7 SEC)
- Head coach: Gerry DiNardo (3rd season)
- Offensive coordinator: Don Frease (3rd season)
- Defensive coordinator: Carl Reese (3rd season)
- Home stadium: Vanderbilt Stadium

1993 Southeastern Conference football standings
	Conf.					Overall
Team	W		L		T	W		L		T
Eastern Division
No. 5 Florida x$	7	–	1	–	0	11	–	2	–	0
No. 12 Tennessee* x	7	–	1	–	0	10	–	2	–	0
Kentucky	4	–	4	–	0	6	–	6	–	0
Georgia	2	–	6	–	0	5	–	6	–	0
South Carolina*	2	–	6	–	0	4	–	7	–	0
Vanderbilt*	1	–	7	–	0	4	–	7	–	0
Western Division
No. 4 Auburn†	8	–	0	–	0	11	–	0	–	0
No. 14 Alabama* x	5	–	3	–	0	9	–	4	–	0
Arkansas*	3	–	4	–	1	5	–	5	–	1
LSU	3	–	5	–	0	5	–	6	–	0
Ole Miss*	3	–	5	–	0	5	–	6	–	0
Mississippi State*	2	–	5	–	1	3	–	6	–	2
Championship: Florida 28, Alabama 13
$ – Conference champion; x – Division champion/co-champions; † – Ineligible for the postseason due to NCAA probation. * – Alabama later forfeited all regular-season wins and one tie due to NCAA violations, giving an official record of 1–12 overall and 0–8 SEC. The forfeit of the tie retroactively gave Tennessee a share of the East title.; Rankings from AP Poll

The 1993 Vanderbilt Commodores football team represented Vanderbilt University in the 1993 NCAA Division I-A football season as a member of the Eastern Division of the Southeastern Conference (SEC). The Commodores were led by head coach Gerry DiNardo in his third season and finished with a record of five wins and six losses (5–6 overall, 2–6 in the SEC).

The 500 win milestone mark was finally made by the 1993 Vanderbilt football team. The 500th win was on October 9, 1993 against Cincinnati with a 17–7 win.

In 1995, the NCAA found Antonio Langham guilty of receiving improper benefits after signing with an agent following the 1992 season, forcing Alabama to forfeit all games in which Langham competed. Vanderbilt does not count the forfeit as a win.

== Schedule ==
Date	Opponent	Site	Result	Attendance	Source
September 4	at Wake Forest*	Groves Stadium; Winston-Salem, NC	W 27–12	16,053	
September 11	No. 2 Alabama	Vanderbilt Stadium; Nashville, TN	W 6–17 (Alabama forfeit)	41,000	
September 18	at Ole Miss	Vaught–Hemingway Stadium; Oxford, MS (rivalry)	L 7–49	32,500	
October 2	No. 23 Auburn	Vanderbilt Stadium; Nashville, TN	L 10–14	40,527	
October 9	Cincinnati*	Vanderbilt Stadium; Nashville, TN	W 17–7	31,176	
October 16	Georgia	Vanderbilt Stadium; Nashville, TN (rivalry)	L 3–41	28,554	
October 23	at South Carolina	Williams–Brice Stadium; Columbia, SC	L 0–22	58,128	
November 6	Kentucky	Vanderbilt Stadium; Nashville, TN (rivalry)	W 12–7	35,000	
November 13	Navy*	Vanderbilt Stadium; Nashville, TN	W 41–7	21,708	
November 20	at No. 8 Florida	Ben Hill Griffin Stadium; Gainesville, FL	L 0–52	83,818	
November 27	at No. 6 Tennessee	Neyland Stadium; Knoxville, TN (rivalry)	L 14–62	94,225	
*Non-conference game; Rankings from AP Poll released prior to the game

== Statistics ==
			Passing				Rushing			
	G	Cmp	Att	Pct	Yds	TD	Att	Yds	Avg	TD
Offense	11	5.0	14.3	35.0	49.6	0.0	51.4	195.4	3.8	1.3
Defense	11	15.8	28.9	54.7	220.3	1.5	36.1	132.1	3.7	1.4
Difference		-10.8	-14.6	-19.7	-170.7	-1.5	+15.3	+63.3	+0.1	-0.1

Passing

	Passing									
Rk	Player	Cmp	Att	Pct	Yds	Y/A	AY/A	TD	Int	Rate
1	Ronnie Gordon	40	98	40.8	400	4.1	2.2	0	4	66.9
2	Cedric Douglas	7	32	21.9	88	2.8	-0.1	0	2	32.5
3	Kenny Simon	8	27	29.6	58	2.1	-9.5	0	7	-4.2

Rushing and receiving

Rk	Player	Att	Yds	Avg	TD	Rec	Yds	Avg	TD	Plays	Yds	Avg	TD
1	Tony Jackson	120	607	5.1	3	9	70	7.8	0	129	677	5.2	3
2	Ronnie Gordon	91	139	1.5	4	0	0	0	0	91	139	1.5	4
3	Cliff Deese	78	315	4.0	2	4	6	1.5	0	82	321	3.9	2
4	Kenny Simon	74	292	3.9	1	15	166	11.1	0	89	458	5.1	1
5	Cedric Douglas	62	105	1.7	0	0	0	0	0	62	105	1.7	0
6	Jermaine Johnson	52	207	4.0	2	0	0	0	0	52	207	4.0	2
7	Royce Love	28	85	3.0	1	1	4	4.0	0	29	89	3.1	1
8	Sam Chalmers	23	100	4.3	0	2	9	4.5	0	25	109	4.4	0
9	Eric Lewis	22	174	7.9	1	6	53	8.8	0	28	227	8.1	1
10	Derek Wilham	10	87	8.7	0	1	19	19.0	0	11	106	9.6	0
11	Jeff Brothers	2	15	7.5	0	0	0	0	0	2	15	7.5	0
12	Gabe Banks	2	0	0.0	0	1	22	22.0	0	3	22	7.3	0
13	Bill Marinangel	1	23	23.0	0	0	0	0	0	1	23	23.0	0
14	Sanford Ware	0	0	0	0	7	97	13.9	0	7	97	13.9	0
15	Jason Tomichek	0	0	0	0	7	71	10.1	0	7	71	10.1	0
16	Brandon Culpepper	0	0	0	0	1	16	16.0	0	1	16	16.0	0
17	Bobby Jackson	0	0	0	0	0	1	13	13.0	0	1	13	13.0

Defense

Rk	Player	Int	Yds	Avg	TD
1	Byron King	4	21	5.3	0
2	Shelton Quarles	2	16	8.0	0
3	Jeff Brothers	1	16	16.0	0
4	Robert Davis	1	45	45.0	1
5	DeReal Finklin	1	1	1.0	0
6	Rico Francis	1	0	0.0	0
7	Chris Ryals	1	9	9.0	0
8	Aaron Smith	1	3	3.0	0
9	Eric Vance	1	5	5.0	0

Kick and punt returns

Rk	Player	Ret	Yds	Avg	TD	Ret	Yds	Avg	TD
1	Tony Jackson	31	753	24.3	0	2	11	5.5	0
2	Gabe Banks	5	65	13.0	0	0	0	0	0
3	Derek Wilham	5	41	8.2	0	0	0	0	0
4	Jermaine Johnson	4	81	20.3	0	0	0	0	0
5	Kenny Simon	3	65	21.7	0	0	0	0	0
6	Jeff Brothers	0	0	0	0	13	68	5.2	0
7	Robert Davis	0	0	0	0	1	25	25.0	0

Kicking and punting

Rk	Player	XPM	XPA	XP%	FGM	FGA	FG%	Pts	Punts	Yds	Avg
1	Steve Yenner	15	16	93.8	8	13	61.5	39	0	0	0
2	Bill Marinangel	0	0	0	0	0	0	0	68	2482	36.5
