= 1993 South Carolina Gamecocks football team =

American college football season

1993 South Carolina Gamecocks football
- Conference: Southeastern Conference
- Eastern Division
- Record: 5–6 (3–5 SEC)
- Head coach: Sparky Woods (5th season)
- Offensive coordinator: Art Wilkins (5th season)
- Defensive coordinator: Miles Aldridge (1st season)
- Home stadium: Williams–Brice Stadium

1993 Southeastern Conference football standings
	Conf.					Overall
Team	W		L		T	W		L		T
Eastern Division
No. 5 Florida x$	7	–	1	–	0	11	–	2	–	0
No. 12 Tennessee* x	7	–	1	–	0	10	–	2	–	0
Kentucky	4	–	4	–	0	6	–	6	–	0
Georgia	2	–	6	–	0	5	–	6	–	0
South Carolina*	2	–	6	–	0	4	–	7	–	0
Vanderbilt*	1	–	7	–	0	4	–	7	–	0
Western Division
No. 4 Auburn†	8	–	0	–	0	11	–	0	–	0
No. 14 Alabama* x	5	–	3	–	0	9	–	4	–	0
Arkansas*	3	–	4	–	1	5	–	5	–	1
LSU	3	–	5	–	0	5	–	6	–	0
Ole Miss*	3	–	5	–	0	5	–	6	–	0
Mississippi State*	2	–	5	–	1	3	–	6	–	2
Championship: Florida 28, Alabama 13
$ – Conference champion; x – Division champion/co-champions; † – Ineligible for the postseason due to NCAA probation. * – Alabama later forfeited all regular-season wins and one tie due to NCAA violations, giving an official record of 1–12 overall and 0–8 SEC. The forfeit of the tie retroactively gave Tennessee a share of the East title.; Rankings from AP Poll

The 1993 South Carolina Gamecocks football team represented the University of South Carolina in the Southeastern Conference (SEC) during the 1993 NCAA Division I-A football season. The Gamecocks were led by head coach Sparky Woods, in his fifth and final season, and played their home games in Williams–Brice Stadium in Columbia, South Carolina.

Beginning in 1993, the "Orange Crush" would dominate the end of Gamecock football schedules for eight seasons, with the final three regular season games always consisting of Tennessee, Florida, and Clemson, in that order. South Carolina would go 2–22 in the "Orange Crush" before changes to scheduling in 2001.

South Carolina had a third consecutive losing season for the first time since 1964. As a result, Woods was fired following the season, with one year remaining on his contract. He finished his tenure with a 25–27–3 record, and a 1–4 record against Clemson. He was replaced by Brad Scott, who won a national championship and coached the Heisman Trophy winner this season, as an offensive coordinator at Florida State.

== Schedule ==
Date	Time	Opponent	Rank	Site	TV	Result	Attendance	Source
September 4	12:30 p.m.	at No. 14 Georgia		Sanford Stadium; Athens, GA (rivalry)	JPS	W 23–21	84,912	
September 11	3:00 p.m.	at Arkansas	No. 19	Razorback Stadium; Fayetteville, AR	PPV	L 17–18	47,321	
September 18	7:00 p.m.	Louisiana Tech*		Williams–Brice Stadium; Columbia, SC		W 34–3	69,208	
September 23	8:00 p.m.	Kentucky		Williams–Brice Stadium; Columbia, SC	ESPN	L 17–21	65,326	
October 2	7:30 p.m.	No. 2 Alabama		Williams–Brice Stadium; Columbia, SC	ESPN	W 6–17 (Alabama Forfeit)	74,718	
October 9	1:00 p.m.	East Carolina*		Williams–Brice Stadium; Columbia, SC		W 27–3	62,307	
October 16	7:00 p.m.	at Mississippi State		Scott Field; Starkville, MS	PPV	L 0–23	33,915	
October 23	1:00 p.m.	Vanderbilt		Williams–Brice Stadium; Columbia, SC		W 22–0	58,128	
October 30	12:30 p.m.	at No. 8 Tennessee		Neyland Stadium; Knoxville, TN (rivalry)	JPS	L 3–55	94,791	
November 13	12:30 p.m.	No. 8 Florida		Williams–Brice Stadium; Columbia, SC	JPS	L 26–37	70,188	
November 20	12:30 p.m.	No. 24 Clemson*		Williams–Brice Stadium; Columbia, SC (rivalry)	JPS	L 13–16	72,928	
*Non-conference game; Rankings from AP Poll released prior to the game; All times are in Eastern time
