= 1993 SEC Championship Game =

- Conference Championship.
- 1993 SEC Championship logo
Florida Gators	Alabama Crimson Tide
(9–2)	(0–11)
28	13
Head coach: Steve Spurrier	Head coach: Gene Stallings
AP / Coaches; 9 / 9	AP / Coaches; 16 / 15
	1	2	3	4	Total
Florida	7	7	7	7	28
Alabama	7	3	3	0	13
- Date: December 4, 1993
- Season: 1993
- Stadium: Legion Field
- Location: Birmingham, Alabama
- MVP: QB Terry Dean, Florida
- Favorite: Florida by 4
- Referee: Mack Gentry
- Attendance: 76,345

United States TV coverage
- Network: ABC
- Announcers: Keith Jackson and Bob Griese

1993 Southeastern Conference football standings
	Conf.					Overall
Team	W		L		T	W		L		T
Eastern Division
No. 5 Florida x$	7	–	1	–	0	11	–	2	–	0
No. 12 Tennessee* x	7	–	1	–	0	10	–	2	–	0
Kentucky	4	–	4	–	0	6	–	6	–	0
Georgia	2	–	6	–	0	5	–	6	–	0
South Carolina*	2	–	6	–	0	4	–	7	–	0
Vanderbilt*	1	–	7	–	0	4	–	7	–	0
Western Division
No. 4 Auburn†	8	–	0	–	0	11	–	0	–	0
No. 14 Alabama* x	5	–	3	–	0	9	–	4	–	0
Arkansas*	3	–	4	–	1	5	–	5	–	1
LSU	3	–	5	–	0	5	–	6	–	0
Ole Miss*	3	–	5	–	0	5	–	6	–	0
Mississippi State*	2	–	5	–	1	3	–	6	–	2
Championship: Florida 28, Alabama 13
$ – Conference champion; x – Division champion/co-champions; † – Ineligible for the postseason due to NCAA probation. * – Alabama later forfeited all regular-season wins and one tie due to NCAA violations, giving an official record of 1–12 overall and 0–8 SEC. The forfeit of the tie retroactively gave Tennessee a share of the East title.; Rankings from AP Poll

The 1993 SEC Championship Game was won by the Florida Gators 28–13 over the Alabama Crimson Tide. The game was played at Legion Field in Birmingham, Alabama, on December 4, 1993, and was televised to a national audience on ABC.

In the 1993 SEC Championship game the Western Division was represented by the Alabama Crimson Tide even though they finished second in the division. The first place Auburn Tigers were on NCAA probation which prohibited them from participating in post season games. Alabama later had their 1993 season affected by the NCAA when in 1995, the NCAA found Antonio Langham guilty of receiving improper benefits after signing with an agent following the 1992 season, forcing Alabama to forfeit all games in which Langham played. Officially, Alabama finished the 1993 season with a 1–12 record, winning only their bowl game.
