= 1993 Ole Miss Rebels football team =

American college football season

1993 Ole Miss Rebels football
- Conference: Southeastern Conference
- Western Division
- Record: 6–5 (4–4 SEC)
- Head coach: Billy Brewer (11th season)
- Offensive coordinator: Larry Beckish (2nd season)
- Offensive scheme: Option
- Defensive coordinator: Joe Lee Dunn (2nd season)
- Base defense: 3–3–5
- Captains: Gary Abide; Clint Conlee; Johnny Dixon; DeWayne Dotson
- Home stadium: Vaught–Hemingway Stadium; Mississippi Veterans Memorial Stadium

1993 Southeastern Conference football standings
	Conf.					Overall
Team	W		L		T	W		L		T
Eastern Division
No. 5 Florida x$	7	–	1	–	0	11	–	2	–	0
No. 12 Tennessee* x	7	–	1	–	0	10	–	2	–	0
Kentucky	4	–	4	–	0	6	–	6	–	0
Georgia	2	–	6	–	0	5	–	6	–	0
South Carolina*	2	–	6	–	0	4	–	7	–	0
Vanderbilt*	1	–	7	–	0	4	–	7	–	0
Western Division
No. 4 Auburn†	8	–	0	–	0	11	–	0	–	0
No. 14 Alabama* x	5	–	3	–	0	9	–	4	–	0
Arkansas*	3	–	4	–	1	5	–	5	–	1
LSU	3	–	5	–	0	5	–	6	–	0
Ole Miss*	3	–	5	–	0	5	–	6	–	0
Mississippi State*	2	–	5	–	1	3	–	6	–	2
Championship: Florida 28, Alabama 13
$ – Conference champion; x – Division champion/co-champions; † – Ineligible for the postseason due to NCAA probation. * – Alabama later forfeited all regular-season wins and one tie due to NCAA violations, giving an official record of 1–12 overall and 0–8 SEC. The forfeit of the tie retroactively gave Tennessee a share of the East title.; Rankings from AP Poll

The 1993 Ole Miss Rebels football team represented the University of Mississippi during the 1993 NCAA Division I-A football season. The Rebels were led by 11th-year head coach Billy Brewer and played their home games at Vaught–Hemingway Stadium in Oxford, Mississippi, and alternate-site home games at Mississippi Veterans Memorial Stadium in Jackson, Mississippi. They competed as members of the Southeastern Conference, finishing tied for fourth in the Western Division with a record of 5–6 (3–5 SEC). Alabama would later forfeit all of their 1993 wins, bringing Ole Miss's official record to 6–5 (4–4 SEC). Brewer would serve his final season this year, as he was fired prior to the 1994 season and replaced by his defensive coordinator, Joe Lee Dunn.

== Schedule ==
Date	Opponent	Rank	Site	TV	Result	Attendance	Source
September 2	at Auburn		Jordan-Hare Stadium; Auburn, AL (rivalry)		L 12–16	78,246	
September 11	Chattanooga*		Vaught–Hemingway Stadium; Oxford, MS		W 40–7	24,500	
September 18	Vanderbilt		Vaught–Hemingway Stadium; Oxford, MS (rivalry)		W 49–7	32,500	
September 25	Georgia		Vaught–Hemingway Stadium; Oxford, MS		W 31–14	38,000	
October 2	at Kentucky	No. 25	Commonwealth Stadium; Lexington, Kentucky		L 0–21	57,075	
October 16	Arkansas		Mississippi Veterans Memorial Stadium; Jackson, MS (rivalry)	JPS	W 19–0	37,000	
October 23	No. 4 Alabama		Vaught–Hemingway Stadium; Oxford, MS (rivalry)	ABC	W 14–19 (Alabama forfeit)	43,500	
October 30	at LSU		Tiger Stadium; Baton Rouge, LA (rivalry)		L 17–19	61,470	
November 6	at Memphis State*		Liberty Bowl Memorial Stadium; Memphis, TN (rivalry)		L 3–19	34,026	
November 13	Northern Illinois*^{†}		Vaught–Hemingway Stadium; Oxford, MS		W 44–0	20,500	
November 27	at Mississippi State		Scott Field; Starkville, MS (Egg Bowl)		L 13–20	40,328	
*Non-conference game; ^{†}Homecoming; Rankings from AP Poll released prior to the game
