= 1993 LSU Tigers football team =

American college football season

1993 LSU Tigers football
- Conference: Southeastern Conference
- Western Division
- Record: 5–6 (3–5 SEC)
- Head coach: Curley Hallman (3rd season)
- Offensive coordinator: Lynn Amedee (1st season)
- Offensive scheme: Multiple
- Defensive coordinator: Michael Bugar (3rd season)
- Base defense: 4–3
- Home stadium: Tiger Stadium

1993 Southeastern Conference football standings
| | Conf. | | | | | Overall |
| Team | W | | L | | T | W | | L | | T |
|---|---|---|---|---|---|---|---|---|---|---|
Eastern Division
| No. 5 Florida x$ | 7 | – | 1 | – | 0 | 11 | – | 2 | – | 0 |
| No. 12 Tennessee* x | 7 | – | 1 | – | 0 | 10 | – | 2 | – | 0 |
| Kentucky | 4 | – | 4 | – | 0 | 6 | – | 6 | – | 0 |
| Georgia | 2 | – | 6 | – | 0 | 5 | – | 6 | – | 0 |
| South Carolina* | 2 | – | 6 | – | 0 | 4 | – | 7 | – | 0 |
| Vanderbilt* | 1 | – | 7 | – | 0 | 4 | – | 7 | – | 0 |
Western Division
| No. 4 Auburn† | 8 | – | 0 | – | 0 | 11 | – | 0 | – | 0 |
| No. 14 Alabama* x | 5 | – | 3 | – | 0 | 9 | – | 4 | – | 0 |
| Arkansas* | 3 | – | 4 | – | 1 | 5 | – | 5 | – | 1 |
| LSU | 3 | – | 5 | – | 0 | 5 | – | 6 | – | 0 |
| Ole Miss* | 3 | – | 5 | – | 0 | 5 | – | 6 | – | 0 |
| Mississippi State* | 2 | – | 5 | – | 1 | 3 | – | 6 | – | 2 |
Championship: Florida 28, Alabama 13
$ – Conference champion; x – Division champion/co-champions; † – Ineligible for the postseason due to NCAA probation. * – Alabama later forfeited all regular-season wins and one tie due to NCAA violations, giving an official record of 1–12 overall and 0–8 SEC. The forfeit of the tie retroactively gave Tennessee a share of the East title.; Rankings from AP Poll

The 1993 LSU Tigers football team represented Louisiana State University (LSU) during the 1993 NCAA Division I-A football season as a member of the Southeastern Conference in the Western Division. The team was led by Curley Hallman in his third season and finished with an overall record of five wins and six losses (5–6 overall, 3–5 in the SEC).

LSU suffered its worst loss in program history, 58–3 to Florida at home October 9. Following a loss at Kentucky, the Tigers went on a three-game winning streak, including a 17–13 win over defending national champion Alabama at Tuscaloosa, that ended the Crimson Tide's 31-game unbeaten streak (the NCAA later shortened the streak to 23 when it forced Alabama to forfeit all of its 1993 victories (and a tie vs. Tennessee) due to violations involving All-America defensive back Antonio Langham).

With a bowl berth on the line in the season finale, Arkansas came to Baton Rouge and gouged the Tigers for 412 yards rushing in a 42–24 triumph, leaving LSU with its fifth consecutive losing campaign.

== Schedule ==
| Date | Time | Opponent | Site | TV | Result | Attendance | Source |
|---|---|---|---|---|---|---|---|
| September 4 | 2:30 p.m. | at No. 5 Texas A&M* | Kyle Field; College Station, TX (rivalry) | ABC | L 0–24 | 61,307 | |
| September 11 | 2:30 p.m. | at Mississippi State | Scott Field; Starkville, MS (rivalry) | ABC | W 18–16 | 33,324 | |
| September 18 | 7:00 p.m. | Auburn | Tiger Stadium; Baton Rouge, LA (rivalry) | | L 10–34 | 71,936 | |
| September 25 | 11:30 a.m. | at No. 13 Tennessee | Neyland Stadium; Knoxville, TN | JPS | L 20–42 | 95,931 | |
| October 2 | 7:00 p.m. | Utah State* | Tiger Stadium; Baton Rouge, LA | | W 38–17 | 57,316 | |
| October 9 | 6:30 p.m. | No. 5 Florida | Tiger Stadium; Baton Rouge, LA (rivalry) | ESPN | L 3–58 | 60,060 | |
| October 16 | 6:00 p.m. | at Kentucky | Commonwealth Stadium; Lexington, KY | PPV | L 17–35 | 54,750 | |
| October 30 | 7:00 p.m. | Ole Miss^{†} | Tiger Stadium; Baton Rouge, LA (Magnolia Bowl) | | W 19–17 | 61,470 | |
| November 6 | 11:30 a.m. | at No. 5 Alabama | Bryant–Denny Stadium; Tuscaloosa, AL (rivalry) | JPS | W 17–13 | 70,123 | |
| November 20 | 7:00 p.m. | Tulane* | Tiger Stadium; Baton Rouge, LA (Battle for the Rag) | | W 24–10 | 58,190 | |
| November 27 | 3:00 p.m. | Arkansas | Tiger Stadium; Baton Rouge, LA (rivalry) | ESPN | L 24–42 | 54,239 | |
*Non-conference game; ^{†}Homecoming; Rankings from AP Poll released prior to the game; All times are in Central time

== Roster ==
1993 LSU Tigers football team roster
Players
Coaches
Offense

| Pos. | # | Name | Class |
|---|---|---|---|
| SE | 2 | Eddie Kennison | Fr |
| QB | 4 | Jamie Howard | So |
| QB | 16 | Chad Loup | Sr |
| SE | 17 | Scott Ray | Sr |
| TE | 47 | David LaFleur | Fr |
| C | 52 | Kevin Mawae | Sr |
| OT | 79 | Marcus Price | Jr |
| TE | 86 | Harold Bishop | Sr |
| WR | 87 | Brett Bech | Jr |

Defense

| Pos. | # | Name | Class |
|---|---|---|---|
| FS | 3 | Ivory Hilliard | Jr |
| CB | 8 | Tory James | So |
| FS | 14 | Anthony Marshall | Sr |
| LB | 88 | Gabe Northern | So |

Special teams

| Pos. | # | Name | Class |
|---|---|---|---|
| PK | 23 | Andre LaFleur | So |
| LS | 51 | Chris Watermeier | Sr |

Head coach

- Curley Hallman (3rd season)

Coordinators/assistant coaches

- Lynn Amedee – Offensive coordinator/quarterbacks
- Steve Buckley – Running backs
- Larry Edmonson – Wide receiver
- Darrell Dickey – Tight ends
- Larry Zierlein – Offensive line
- Michael Bugar – Defensive coordinator/defensive line
- Jerry Baldwin – Inside linebackers
- Phil Bennett – Outside linebackers/defensive ends
- Steve Davis – Special teams coordinator/defensive backs

Legend

- (C) Team captain
- (S) Suspended
- (I) Ineligible
- Injured
- Redshirt

Roster
