= 1993 Alabama Crimson Tide football team =

American college football season

1993 Alabama Crimson Tide football

SEC West Division champion Gator Bowl champion

SEC Championship Game, L 13–28 vs. Florida

Gator Bowl, W 24–10 vs. North Carolina
- Conference: Southeastern Conference
- Western Division

Ranking
- Coaches: No. 13
- AP: No. 14
- Record: 1–12, 8 wins forfeited, 1 tie forfeited (0–8 SEC, 5 wins forfeited, 1 tie forfeited)
- Head coach: Gene Stallings (4th season)
- Offensive coordinator: Mal Moore (12th season)
- Offensive scheme: Pro-style
- Defensive coordinator: Bill Oliver (1st season)
- Base defense: 3–4 or 4–3
- Captains: Chris Anderson; Lemanski Hall; Antonio Langham; Tobie Sheils
- Home stadium: Bryant–Denny Stadium; Legion Field

1993 Southeastern Conference football standings
	Conf.					Overall
Team	W		L		T	W		L		T
Eastern Division
No. 5 Florida x$	7	–	1	–	0	11	–	2	–	0
No. 12 Tennessee* x	7	–	1	–	0	10	–	2	–	0
Kentucky	4	–	4	–	0	6	–	6	–	0
Georgia	2	–	6	–	0	5	–	6	–	0
South Carolina*	2	–	6	–	0	4	–	7	–	0
Vanderbilt*	1	–	7	–	0	4	–	7	–	0
Western Division
No. 4 Auburn†	8	–	0	–	0	11	–	0	–	0
No. 14 Alabama* x	5	–	2	–	1	9	–	3	–	1
Arkansas*	3	–	4	–	1	5	–	5	–	1
LSU	3	–	5	–	0	5	–	6	–	0
Ole Miss*	3	–	5	–	0	5	–	6	–	0
Mississippi State*	2	–	5	–	1	3	–	6	–	2
Championship: Florida 28, Alabama 13
$ – Conference champion; x – Division champion/co-champions; † – Ineligible for the postseason due to NCAA probation. * – Alabama later forfeited all regular-season wins and one tie due to NCAA violations, giving an official record of 1–12 overall and 0–8 SEC. The forfeit of the tie retroactively gave Tennessee a share of the East title.; Rankings from AP Poll

The 1993 Alabama Crimson Tide football team represented the University of Alabama for the 1993 NCAA Division I-A football season, competing in the Southeastern Conference Western Division. The team was led by head coach Gene Stallings, who was in his fourth season at the position.

Alabama entered the season as the defending national champion, following their victory in the 1993 Sugar Bowl, and ranked #2 in the AP Poll, behind Florida State.

Alabama won the first five games of the season, extending their winning streak to 28 games, matching the longest win streak in school history. The streak ended with a 17–17 tie against Tennessee. The unbeaten streak continued to 31 games before Alabama fell to LSU, 17–13.

Alabama finished second in the SEC West in 1993, but played in the SEC Championship Game as Auburn was prohibited from post-season play because of NCAA violations. In the SEC Championship Game, Alabama lost 28–13 to the Florida Gators at Legion Field. Alabama received an invitation to the Gator Bowl versus North Carolina, winning 24–10 and finishing with a 9–3–1 record.

In 1995, the NCAA found Antonio Langham guilty of receiving improper benefits after signing with an agent following the 1992 season, forcing Alabama to forfeit all games in which Langham competed. Officially, Alabama finished the season with a 1–12 record, only winning their bowl game.

== Schedule ==
Date	Time	Opponent	Rank	Site	TV	Result	Attendance	Source
September 4	4:00 p.m.	Tulane*	No. 2	Legion Field; Birmingham, AL	PPV	F 31–17 (forfeit)	83,091	
September 11	11:30 a.m.	at Vanderbilt	No. 2	Vanderbilt Stadium; Nashville, TN	JPS	F 17–6 (forfeit)	41,000	
September 18	11:30 a.m.	Arkansas	No. 2	Bryant–Denny Stadium; Tuscaloosa, AL	JPS	F 43–3 (forfeit)	70,123	
September 25	2:00 p.m.	Louisiana Tech*	No. 2	Legion Field; Birmingham, AL	PPV	F 56–3 (forfeit)	83,091	
October 2	6:30 p.m.	at South Carolina	No. 2	Williams–Brice Stadium; Columbia, SC	ESPN	F 17–6 (forfeit)	74,718	
October 16	2:30 p.m.	No. 10 Tennessee	No. 2	Legion Field; Birmingham, AL (Third Saturday in October)	ABC	T 17–17	83,091	
October 23	2:30 p.m.	at Ole Miss	No. 4	Vaught–Hemingway Stadium; Oxford, MS (rivalry)	ABC	F 19–14 (forfeit)	43,500	
October 30	2:30 p.m.	Southern Miss*^{†}	No. 5	Bryant–Denny Stadium; Tuscaloosa, AL	PPV	F 40–0 (forfeit)	70,123	
November 6	11:30 a.m.	LSU	No. 5	Bryant–Denny Stadium; Tuscaloosa, AL (rivalry)	JPS	L 13–17	70,123	
November 13	2:30 p.m.	Mississippi State	No. 12	Bryant–Denny Stadium; Tuscaloosa, AL (rivalry)	ABC	F 36–25 (forfeit)	70,123	
November 20	1:00 p.m.	at No. 6 Auburn	No. 11	Jordan-Hare Stadium; Auburn, AL (Iron Bowl)		L 14–22	85,214	
December 4	2:30 p.m.	vs. No. 9 Florida	No. 16	Legion Field; Birmingham, AL (SEC Championship Game, rivalry)	ABC	L 13–28	76,345	
December 31, 1993	6:00 p.m.	vs. No. 12 North Carolina*	No. 18	Gator Bowl Stadium; Jacksonville, FL (Gator Bowl)	TBS	W 24–10	67,205	
*Non-conference game; ^{†}Homecoming; Rankings from AP Poll released prior to the game; All times are in Central time

== Roster ==
1993 Alabama Crimson Tide football team roster
Players
Coaches
Offense

Pos.	#	Name	Class
QB	7	Jay Barker	Jr
RB	2	David Palmer	Jr

Defense

Pos.	#	Name	Class
LB	11	Lemanski Hall	Sr
DB	43	Antonio Langham	Jr
DB		Mickey Conn	Jr

Special teams

Pos.	#	Name	Class

Head coach

- Gene Stallings

Coordinators/assistant coaches

- Ellis Johnson
  Outside linebackers
- Dabo Swinney
  Graduate assistant

Legend

- (C) Team captain
- (S) Suspended
- (I) Ineligible
- Injured
- Redshirt

== Regular season statistics ==
=== Team ===
Statistics	Alabama	Opponents
Scoring	316	158
Average	26.3	13.2
Total Offense	4,688	3,104
Passing	2,569	1,539
Rushing	2,119	1,565
Touchdowns	36	19
Passing	13	9
Rushing	20	10
Returns	3	0
Turnovers	42	39
Fumbles–Lost	26–10	17–7
Int–Yards	22–213	16–167

=== Quarter-by-quarter statistics ===
==== Scoring ====
	1	2	3	4	Total
Alabama	67	125	55	69	316
Opponents	38	31	34	55	158

==== Time of possession ====
	1	2	3	4	Total
Alabama	96:12	87:39	96:38	102:38	382:07
Opponents	83:48	92:21	83:22	77:22	337:53

=== Passing ===
Name	Games	Cmp–Att	Pct	Yards	TD	INT	Long
Jay Barker	9	98–171	.573	1,525	4	7	59
Brian Burgdorf	9	48–84	.571	533	4	3	60
David Palmer	12	15–30	.500	260	2	3	54
Freddie Kitchens	7	7–14	.500	188	2	3	77
Sherman Williams	11	1–1	1.000	63	1	0	63
Total	12	169–300	.563	2,569	13	16	77
