= Frank Harvey (American football) =

American football player (born 1971)

No. 32
- Position: Fullback

Personal information
- Born: January 19, 1971 (age 55); Dawson, Georgia, U.S.
- Listed height: 6 ft 0 in (1.83 m)
- Listed weight: 245 lb (111 kg)

Career information
- High school: Terrell County (Dawson)
- College: Georgia (1990–1993)
- NFL draft: 1994: 7th round, 204th overall pick

Career history
- Arizona Cardinals (1994); Cleveland Browns (1994); Philadelphia Eagles (1996)*
- * Offseason or practice squad member only
- Stats at Pro Football Reference

Willie Frank Harvey (born January 19, 1971) is an American former professional football player who was a fullback for one season with the Arizona Cardinals of the National Football League (NFL). He played college football for the Georgia Bulldogs and was selected by the Cardinals in the seventh round of the 1994 NFL draft. He was also a member of the Cleveland Browns.

== Early life ==
Willie Frank Harvey was born on January 19, 1971, in Dawson, Georgia. He attended Terrell County High School in Dawson.

== College career ==
Harvey was a four-year letterman for the Georgia Bulldogs of the University of Georgia from 1990 to 1993. He rushed 15 times for 31 yards in 1990. Harvey quit the team his freshman year but his mother made him return the same day. In 1991, he recorded 30 carries for 101 yards and four touchdowns, and five catches for 33 yards. Harvey rushed 47 times for 307 yards and two touchdowns in 1992 while also catching three passes for 25 yards. As a senior in 1993, he totaled 36 rushing attempts for 146 yards and three touchdowns, and nine receptions for 35 yards.

== Professional career ==
Harvey was selected by the Arizona Cardinals in the seventh round, with the 204th overall pick, of the 1994 NFL draft. He officially signed with the team on June 13. He was inactive for Week 1 and then played in the next two games before being released on September 19, 1994. Harvey was later signed to the Cardinals' practice squad on November 1, 1994.

Harvey was signed to the Cleveland Browns' active roster off of the Cardinals' practice squad on December 21, 1994. He was then inactive for the Browns' final two games that year. He was inactive for the team's two playoff games as well. Harvey became a free agent after the season.

He signed with the Philadelphia Eagles on July 24, 1996, but was released on August 15, 1996.

== Personal life ==
Harvey later spent time as a plant technician for Procter & Gamble. He has also worked as a football coach, including at Deerfield-Windsor School.
