= 1993 Tennessee Volunteers football team =

American college football season

1993 Tennessee Volunteers football

SEC Eastern Division co-champion

Florida Citrus Bowl, L 13–31 vs. Penn State
- Conference: Southeastern Conference
- Eastern Division

Ranking
- Coaches: No. 11
- AP: No. 12
- Record: 10–2 (7–1 SEC)
- Head coach: Phillip Fulmer (1st season)
- Offensive coordinator: David Cutcliffe (1st season)
- Offensive scheme: Pro-style
- Defensive coordinator: Larry Marmie (2nd season)
- Base defense: 4–3
- Captains: Craig Faulkner; Cory Fleming; Horace Morris; James Wilson
- Home stadium: Neyland Stadium

1993 Southeastern Conference football standings
	Conf.					Overall
Team	W		L		T	W		L		T
Eastern Division
No. 5 Florida x$	7	–	1	–	0	11	–	2	–	0
No. 12 Tennessee* x	7	–	1	–	0	10	–	2	–	0
Kentucky	4	–	4	–	0	6	–	6	–	0
Georgia	2	–	6	–	0	5	–	6	–	0
South Carolina*	2	–	6	–	0	4	–	7	–	0
Vanderbilt*	1	–	7	–	0	4	–	7	–	0
Western Division
No. 4 Auburn†	8	–	0	–	0	11	–	0	–	0
No. 14 Alabama* x	5	–	3	–	0	9	–	4	–	0
Arkansas*	3	–	4	–	1	5	–	5	–	1
LSU	3	–	5	–	0	5	–	6	–	0
Ole Miss*	3	–	5	–	0	5	–	6	–	0
Mississippi State*	2	–	5	–	1	3	–	6	–	2
Championship: Florida 28, Alabama 13
$ – Conference champion; x – Division champion/co-champions; † – Ineligible for the postseason due to NCAA probation. * – Alabama later forfeited all regular-season wins and one tie due to NCAA violations, giving an official record of 1–12 overall and 0–8 SEC. The forfeit of the tie retroactively gave Tennessee a share of the East title.; Rankings from AP Poll

The 1993 Tennessee Volunteers football team represented the University of Tennessee in the 1993 NCAA Division I-A football season. The Volunteers offense scored 484 points while the defense allowed 175 points. Phillip Fulmer was the head coach and led the club to an appearance in the Florida Citrus Bowl.

== Schedule ==
Date	Time	Opponent	Rank	Site	TV	Result	Attendance	Source
September 4	4:00 p.m.	Louisiana Tech*	No. 10	Neyland Stadium; Knoxville, TN	PPV	W 50–0	95,106	
September 11	7:30 p.m.	No. 22 Georgia	No. 8	Neyland Stadium; Knoxville, TN (rivalry)	ESPN	W 38–6	96,228	
September 18	3:30 p.m.	at No. 9 Florida	No. 5	Ben Hill Griffin Stadium; Gainesville, FL (rivalry)	ABC	L 34–41	85,247	
September 25	12:30 p.m.	LSU	No. 11	Neyland Stadium; Knoxville, TN	JPS	W 42–20	95,931	
October 2	4:00 p.m.	Duke*^{†}	No. 11	Neyland Stadium; Knoxville, TN	PPV	W 52–19	96,173	
October 9	12:30 p.m.	at Arkansas	No. 11	War Memorial Stadium; Little Rock, AR	JPS	W 28–14	54,150	
October 16	3:30 p.m.	at No. 2 Alabama	No. 10	Legion Field; Birmingham, AL (Third Saturday in October)	ABC	W 17–17 (Alabama forfeit)	83,091	
October 30	12:30 p.m.	South Carolina	No. 8	Neyland Stadium; Knoxville, TN (rivalry)	JPS	W 55–3	94,791	
November 6	3:30 p.m.	No. 13 Louisville*	No. 7	Neyland Stadium; Knoxville, TN	ABC	W 45–10	94,826	
November 20	7:30 p.m.	at Kentucky	No. 7	Commonwealth Stadium; Lexington, KY (rivalry)	ESPN	W 48–0	57,878	
November 27	12:30 p.m.	Vanderbilt	No. 6	Neyland Stadium; Knoxville, TN (rivalry)	JPS	W 62–14	94,225	
January 1	1:00 p.m.	vs. No. 13 Penn State*	No. 6	Florida Citrus Bowl; Orlando, FL (Florida Citrus Bowl)	ABC	L 13–31	72,456	
*Non-conference game; ^{†}Homecoming; Rankings from AP Poll released prior to the game; All times are in Eastern time

== Roster ==
1993 Tennessee Volunteers football team roster
Players
Coaches
Offense

Pos.	#	Name	Class
WR	12	Cory Fleming	Sr
RB	33	James Stewart	Jr
QB	21	Heath Shuler	Jr

Defense

Pos.	#	Name	Class
DE	99	Paul Yatkowski	Sr

Special teams

Pos.	#	Name	Class

Head coach

- Phillip Fulmer

Coordinators/assistant coaches

- David Cutcliffe – Offensive coordinator/quarterbacks
- Randy Sanders – Running backs
- Kippy Brown – Wide receivers/assistant head coach
- Mark Bradley – Tight ends
- Steve Marshall – Offensive line
- Larry Marmie – Defensive coordinator
- Jacob Burney – Defensive line
- John Chavis – Linebackers
- Lovie Smith – Defensive backs

Legend

- (C) Team captain
- (S) Suspended
- (I) Ineligible
- Injured
- Redshirt

== Team players drafted into the NFL ==
Player	Position	Round	Pick	NFL club
Heath Shuler	Quarterback	1	3	Washington Redskins
Charlie Garner	Running back	2	42	Philadelphia Eagles
Cory Fleming	Wide receiver	3	87	San Francisco 49ers
Shane Bonham	Defensive tackle	3	93	Detroit Lions
Horace Morris	Linebacker	5	152	New York Jets

== Awards and honors ==
Heath Shuler won the 1993 SEC Player of the Year and was Heisman Runner Up to Florida State's Charlie Ward.
