= 1993 NCAA Division I-A football season =

American college football season

1993 NCAA Division I-A season
- Number of teams: 106
- Preseason AP No. 1: Florida State

Postseason
- Bowl games: 19
- Heisman Trophy: Florida State quarterback Charlie Ward

Bowl Coalition Championship
- 1994 Orange Bowl
- Site: Miami Orange Bowl, Miami, Florida
- Champion(s): Florida State (AP, Coaches, FWAA)

Division I-A football seasons
- ← 1992 1994 →

The 1993 NCAA Division I-A football season began in August 1993 and concluded in January 1994, which saw Florida State crowned national champions, even though Notre Dame was ranked next to them and had a head to head win against them.

Under the Bowl Coalition, undefeated Big 8 champ and No. 2 ranked Nebraska hosted ACC champ and No. 1 ranked Florida State in the Orange Bowl. This produced a clear champion in the Coaches Poll and the AP poll, despite Florida State's loss to Notre Dame 31–24 during the regular season, in a game known by many as the "Game of the Century". This much hyped clash between No. 1 and No. 2 was the site of the first ever "live" broadcast of the ESPN College GameDay show and did not fail to live up to expectations as Irish defensive back Shawn Wooden batted down a Charlie Ward pass in the end zone with three seconds left to play. Despite the win over Florida State, Notre Dame's title chances ended the very next week when the Fighting Irish lost to No. 17 Boston College. Further controversy surrounded the inclusion of one-loss Florida State in the national title game over undefeated West Virginia, who was ranked No. 2 (ahead of Florida State) by the final regular season coaches' poll but not the AP (Nebraska was No. 2 in the AP).

Despite beating Florida State in the regular season, Notre Dame finished No. 2 in the two major polls. Florida State, during the 1993 regular season played No. 2 Notre Dame, No. 3 Nebraska, No. 15 Miami, No. 5 Florida, No. 19 North Carolina, and No. 23 Clemson. FSU went 3–1 vs top 7 teams while playing only 1 home game in the 4 contests. The Auburn Tigers had an 11–0 record but due to previous NCAA violations, they were not allowed to play in the SEC title contest or a bowl game, and were not included in the Coaches' poll (Auburn was part of the AP poll, and finished the year as the 4th ranked team in the country).

Florida State quarterback Charlie Ward threw for 3,032 yards, completed 70 percent of his passes and became the first player to win the Heisman Trophy and the national championship in the same season since Pittsburgh running back Tony Dorsett in 1976.

== Rule changes ==
- The distance between the hashmarks was narrowed from 53 feet, 4 inches (the same as high school football, with the exception of Texas, which is the same as College Football at 40 feet) to 40 feet (the standard used by the National Football League through the 1971 season). This cut down on severe angles for kickers who attempted short field goals, although angles would still be far greater than those encountered by kickers in the NFL, where the hashmarks are the same width as the goalposts, 18 feet, 6 inches.
- The "fumblerooski" play is outlawed as intentional fumbles are now illegal.
- Players who are bleeding or have open wounds are required to leave the game until the bleeding is stopped and the wound treated.
- The loss of down penalty associated with offensive pass interference has been deleted. The yardage penalty remains at 15 yards.
- Officials are instructed to flag players for unsportsmanlike conduct (15 yards) for actions on the field that are prolonged, excessive, or meant to bring attention to themselves (such as the "Heisman pose" and mimicking the firing of six-shooters).
- On kickoffs, at least four players must be lined up on either side of the kicker.
- All balls must be made of leather. Composite and rubber balls were outlawed.

== Conference and program changes ==
Five teams changed conferences and one team dropped its football team prior to the season. As such, the total number of Division I-A schools decreased to 106.

- The Big East starts playing a regular season schedule.
- Penn State also played its first year as a member of the Big Ten Conference.
- Cal State Fullerton dropped its football program, which had been a member of the Big West.
- The Big West responded by adding four new programs: Southwestern Louisiana (now Louisiana–Lafayette) and Arkansas State which had just made the jump to Division I-A in 1990, and former independents Northern Illinois and Louisiana Tech.

School	1992 Conference	1993 Conference
Arkansas State Indians	I-A Independent	Big West
Cal State Fullerton Titans	Big West	Dropped Program
Louisiana Tech Bulldogs	I-A Independent	Big West
Northern Illinois Huskies	I-A Independent	Big West
Penn State Nittany Lions	I-A Independent	Big Ten
Southwestern Louisiana Ragin' Cajuns	I-A Independent	Big West

== Regular season ==
=== August–September ===
The preseason AP Poll featured Florida State at No. 1 and defending champion Alabama at No. 2, followed by No. 3 Michigan, No. 4 Texas A&M, and No. 5 Miami.

August 28: No. 1 Florida State shut out Kansas 42–0 in the Kickoff Classic. None of the other top teams had started their schedules, but Miami moved up to tie Michigan at No. 3 in the next poll, with Texas A&M falling to No. 5.

September 4: No. 1 Florida State won 45–7 at Duke, No. 2 Alabama defeated Tulane 31–17, No. 3 Michigan beat Washington State 41–14, fellow No. 3 Miami visited No 20 Boston College for a 23–7 victory, and No. 5 Texas A&M shut out LSU 24–0. Miami dropped back to No. 4 in the next poll, with the other top teams remaining the same.

September 11: No. 1 Florida State dominated No. 21 Clemson 57-0 and No. 2 Alabama won 17–6 at Vanderbilt, but No. 3 Michigan fell 27–23 to No. 11 Notre Dame. No. 4 Miami was idle, while No. 5 Texas A&M lost 44–14 at No. 17 Oklahoma. No. 8 Tennessee beat No. 22 Georgia 38-6 and moved up in the next poll: No. 1 Florida State, No. 2 Alabama, No. 3 Miami, No. 4 Notre Dame, and No. 5 Tennessee.

September 18: No. 1 Florida State visited No. 13 North Carolina and won 33–7. No. 2 Alabama defeated Arkansas 43–3, No. 3 Miami beat Virginia Tech 21–2, and No. 4 Notre Dame won 36–14 over Michigan State. No. 5 Tennessee fell 41–34 to No. 9 Florida, who replaced them in the next poll: No. 1 Florida State, No. 2 Alabama, No. 3 Miami, No. 4 Notre Dame, and No. 5 Florida.

September 25: No. 1 Florida State and No. 5 Florida were idle. No. 2 Alabama blasted Louisiana Tech 56–3. No. 3 Miami held off No. 13 Colorado 35–29 in a game which featured a benches-clearing brawl near the end of the first half. No. 4 Notre Dame shut out Purdue 17–0, and the top five remained the same in the next poll.

=== October ===
October 2: No. 1 Florida State continued their string of blowout victories with a 51-0 annihilation of Georgia Tech. No. 2 Alabama won 17–6 at South Carolina, No. 3 Miami beat Georgia Southern 30–7, No. 4 Notre Dame visited Stanford for a 48–20 victory, and No. 5 Florida defeated Mississippi State 38–24. The top five again remained the same in the next poll.

October 9: No. 1 Florida State had outscored their first five opponents by a total of 228–14, but their next foe would be No. 3 Miami, who had defeated them in heartbreaking fashion in both 1991 and 1992. This time, the Seminoles finally prevailed with a 28–10 victory. No. 2 Alabama was idle, No. 4 Notre Dame shut out Pittsburgh 44–0, No. 5 Florida won 58–3 at LSU, and No. 6 Ohio State was a 20–12 victor at Illinois. The next poll featured No. 1 Florida State, No. 2 Alabama, No. 3 Notre Dame, No. 4 Florida, and No. 5 Ohio State.

October 16: No. 1 Florida State defeated No. 15 Virginia 40–14. No. 2 Alabama trailed No. 10 Tennessee late in the fourth quarter, but put together a game-ending 83-yard drive to salvage a 17–17 tie. No. 3 Notre Dame won 45–20 at Brigham Young. In another SEC nailbiter, No. 4 Florida fell 38–35 to No. 19 Auburn on a late field goal. No. 5 Ohio State beat No. 25 Michigan State 28–21, and No. 6 Nebraska defeated Kansas State 45–28. The next poll featured No. 1 Florida State, No. 2 Notre Dame, No. 3 Ohio State, No. 4 Alabama, and No. 5 Nebraska.

October 23: No. 1 Florida State was idle, No. 2 Notre Dame defeated USC 31–13, and No. 3 Ohio State won 45–24 at Purdue. No. 4 Alabama overcame an injury to quarterback Jay Barker and beat Mississippi 19–14. No. 5 Nebraska overwhelmed Missouri 49–7, but No. 6 Miami was even more impressive in a 49–0 shutout of Syracuse. The Hurricanes moved up in the next poll: No. 1 Florida State, No. 2 Notre Dame, No. 3 Ohio State, No. 4 Miami, and No. 5 Alabama.

October 30: No. 1 Florida State shut out Wake Forest 55–0, No. 2 Notre Dame defeated Navy 58–27, No. 3 Ohio State beat No. 12 Penn State 24–6, No. 4 Miami won 42–7 over Temple, and No. 5 Alabama blanked Southern Mississippi 40–0. The top five remained the same in the next poll.

=== November–December ===
November 6: No. 1 Florida State won 49–20 at Maryland. No. 2 Notre Dame was idle. No. 3 Ohio State blocked a last-second field goal to come away with a 14–14 tie against No. 15 Wisconsin. No. 4 Miami won 35–7 at Pittsburgh. No. 5 Alabama carried a 31-game unbeaten streak into their game against LSU, but the Crimson Tide threw four second-half interceptions to enable a 17–13 victory for the Tigers. No. 6 Nebraska was taken down to the wire by Kansas, but the Cornhuskers stopped a Jayhawks two-point conversion to preserve a 21–20 win and move back into the top five: No. 1 Florida State, No. 2 Notre Dame, No. 3 Miami, No. 4 Nebraska, and No. 5 Ohio State.

November 13: Up to this point, No. 1 Florida State had defeated all nine of their opponents by 18 points or more, but now they would face their toughest test in a “Game of the Century” against No. 2 Notre Dame. The Irish stunned the Seminoles by running off 24 consecutive points after an early Florida State touchdown, and they still led 31–17 with a few minutes left to play. But FSU quarterback Charlie Ward led the Seminoles on a rapid drive which resulted in a touchdown pass on 4th-and-20, and the Irish went three-and-out on the next possession. Getting the ball back with less than a minute left, Florida State made it all the way to Notre Dame's 14-yard line, but Ward's last-second desperation pass was knocked away, and the Irish prevailed 31–24. Meanwhile, No. 3 Miami defeated Rutgers 31–17, No. 4 Nebraska beat Iowa State 49–17 to clinch the Big 8 title and an Orange Bowl berth, and No. 5 Ohio State won 23–17 over Indiana. The next poll featured No. 1 Notre Dame, No. 2 Florida State, No. 3 Nebraska, No. 4 Miami, and No. 5 Ohio State.

November 20: As No. 1 Notre Dame went into their season-ending game against No. 17 Boston College (a team which they had beaten 54-7 the previous year), the only uncertainty seemed to be whether their national championship opponent should be Nebraska in the Orange Bowl or Florida State in a rematch. However, the Eagles shocked the Irish by dominating the first three quarters, and BC held a 38–17 lead early in the fourth. Notre Dame responded with a frantic comeback, scoring 22 points in 11 minutes to go back on top by a single point. But, just as Florida State had done the previous week, Boston College went on one last drive into Notre Dame territory. This time the Irish were not able to make the stop, as walk-on kicker David Gordon hit a last-second field goal to give the Eagles a 41–39 win. No. 2 Florida State bounced back with a 62-3 domination of North Carolina State, and No. 3 Nebraska was idle. No. 4 Miami suffered a 17–14 loss at No. 9 West Virginia; the Mountaineers, who had started the season unranked, improved their record to 10–0. No. 5 Ohio State needed a win over unranked Michigan to clinch the Big Ten title and their first Rose Bowl berth in nine years. Instead, the Buckeyes threw interceptions on four straight possessions and failed to reach the Wolverines’ 20-yard line at any point in the game. Michigan's 28–0 win put No. 12 Wisconsin, who held the tiebreaker advantage over Ohio State, in line for a trip to Pasadena. No. 6 Auburn defeated No. 11 Alabama 22–14 in the Iron Bowl; the Tigers finished the season with a perfect 11–0 record, but were ineligible for postseason play due to recruiting violations. The next poll featured No. 1 Florida State, No. 2 Nebraska, No. 3 Auburn, No. 4 Notre Dame, and No. 5 West Virginia.

November 26–27: No. 1 Florida State won 33–21 at No. 7 Florida, and No. 2 Nebraska defeated No. 16 Oklahoma 21–7. No. 3 Auburn and No. 4 Notre Dame had finished their schedules. No. 11 Boston College almost pulled off another upset, but No. 5 West Virginia came back from an 11-point fourth quarter deficit to win 17-14 and complete their undefeated season. The Mountaineers moved up in the next AP Poll: No. 1 Florida State, No. 2 Nebraska, No. 3 West Virginia, No. 4 Auburn, and No. 5 Notre Dame. The Coaches’ Poll disagreed with the AP's ordering of the top teams, choosing Nebraska for No. 1, West Virginia for No. 2, and Florida State for No. 3.

With No. 4 Auburn ineligible, No. 16 Alabama represented the SEC Western Division in the conference championship game on December 4. No. 9 Florida took revenge for the previous year's defeat with a 28–13 victory, earning the Gators a trip to the Sugar Bowl. Even though the top teams had already finished their schedule, the AP voters slightly shuffled their order in the final poll of the regular season: No. 1 Florida State, No. 2 Nebraska, No. 3 West Virginia, No. 4 Notre Dame, and No. 5 Auburn. The Coaches’ Poll remained the same.

Undefeated Nebraska was assured of a spot in the national championship game. The organizers chose Florida State as the Cornhuskers' Orange Bowl opponent, feeling that the Seminoles’ pattern of dominant victories outweighed Notre Dame's head-to-head win and West Virginia's undefeated record. (Florida State had easily beaten Miami and Maryland, two teams which the Mountaineers struggled to beat.) Notre Dame would face No. 7 Texas A&M, the SWC champion, in the Cotton Bowl, while West Virginia squared off against No. 8 Florida in the Sugar Bowl. The major bowl matchups were rounded out by No. 9 Wisconsin against No. 14 UCLA in the Rose and No. 10 Miami against No. 16 Arizona in the Fiesta.

== Conference standings ==
1993 Atlantic Coast Conference football standings
	Conf.			Overall
Team	W		L	W		L
No. 1 Florida State $	8	–	0	12	–	1
No. 19 North Carolina	6	–	2	10	–	3
No. 23 Clemson	5	–	3	9	–	3
Virginia	5	–	3	7	–	5
NC State	4	–	4	7	–	5
Georgia Tech	3	–	5	5	–	6
Duke	2	–	6	3	–	8
Maryland	2	–	6	2	–	9
Wake Forest	1	–	7	2	–	9
$ – Conference champion; Rankings from AP Poll

1993 Big East Conference football standings
	Conf.					Overall
Team	W		L		T	W		L		T
No. 7 West Virginia $	7	–	0	–	0	11	–	1	–	0
No. 15 Miami (FL)	6	–	1	–	0	9	–	3	–	0
No. 13 Boston College	5	–	2	–	0	9	–	3	–	0
No. 22 Virginia Tech	4	–	3	–	0	9	–	3	–	0
Syracuse	3	–	4	–	0	6	–	4	–	1
Pittsburgh	2	–	5	–	0	3	–	8	–	0
Rutgers	1	–	6	–	0	4	–	7	–	0
Temple	0	–	7	–	0	1	–	10	–	0
$ – Conference champion; Rankings from AP Poll

1993 Big Eight Conference football standings
	Conf.					Overall
Team	W		L		T	W		L		T
No. 3 Nebraska $	7	–	0	–	0	11	–	1	–	0
No. 16 Colorado	5	–	1	–	1	8	–	3	–	1
No. 20 Kansas State	4	–	2	–	1	9	–	2	–	1
No. 17 Oklahoma %	4	–	3	–	0	9	–	3	–	0
Kansas	3	–	4	–	0	5	–	7	–	0
Missouri	2	–	5	–	0	3	–	7	–	1
Iowa State	2	–	5	–	0	3	–	8	–	0
Oklahoma State	0	–	7	–	0	3	–	8	–	0
$ – Bowl Coalition representative as champion % – Bowl Coalition at-large representative; Rankings from AP Poll

1993 Big Ten Conference football standings
	Conf.					Overall
Team	W		L		T	W		L		T
No. 6 Wisconsin +	6	–	1	–	1	10	–	1	–	1
No. 11 Ohio State +	6	–	1	–	1	10	–	1	–	1
No. 8 Penn State	6	–	2	–	0	10	–	2	–	0
Indiana	5	–	3	–	0	8	–	4	–	0
No. 21 Michigan	5	–	3	–	0	8	–	4	–	0
Illinois	5	–	3	–	0	5	–	6	–	0
Michigan State	4	–	4	–	0	6	–	6	–	0
Iowa	3	–	5	–	0	6	–	6	–	0
Minnesota	3	–	5	–	0	4	–	7	–	0
Northwestern	0	–	8	–	0	2	–	9	–	0
Purdue	0	–	8	–	0	1	–	10	–	0
+ – Conference co-champions; Rankings from AP Poll

1993 Big West Conference football standings
	Conf.					Overall
Team	W		L		T	W		L		T
Southwestern Louisiana +	5	–	1	–	0	8	–	3	–	0
Utah State +	5	–	1	–	0	7	–	5	–	0
Nevada	4	–	2	–	0	7	–	4	–	0
New Mexico State	4	–	2	–	0	5	–	6	–	0
Northern Illinois	3	–	3	–	0	4	–	7	–	0
Pacific (CA)	2	–	4	–	0	3	–	8	–	0
UNLV	2	–	4	–	0	3	–	8	–	0
Louisiana Tech	2	–	4	–	0	2	–	9	–	0
San Jose State	2	–	4	–	0	2	–	9	–	0
Arkansas State	1	–	5	–	0	2	–	8	–	1
+ – Conference co-champions

1993 Mid-American Conference football standings
	Conf.					Overall
Team	W		L		T	W		L		T
Ball State $	7	–	0	–	1	8	–	3	–	1
Western Michigan	6	–	1	–	1	7	–	3	–	1
Bowling Green	5	–	1	–	2	6	–	3	–	2
Central Michigan	5	–	4	–	0	5	–	6	–	0
Akron	4	–	4	–	0	5	–	6	–	0
Ohio	4	–	5	–	0	4	–	7	–	0
Eastern Michigan	3	–	5	–	0	4	–	7	–	0
Toledo	3	–	5	–	0	4	–	7	–	0
Miami (OH)	3	–	6	–	0	4	–	7	–	0
Kent State	0	–	9	–	0	0	–	11	–	0
$ – Conference champion

1993 Pacific-10 Conference football standings
	Conf.					Overall
Team	W		L		T	W		L		T
No. 10 Arizona +	6	–	2	–	0	10	–	2	–	0
No. 18 UCLA +	6	–	2	–	0	8	–	4	–	0
USC +	6	–	2	–	0	8	–	5	–	0
Washington	5	–	3	–	0	7	–	4	–	0
No. 25 California	4	–	4	–	0	9	–	4	–	0
Arizona State	4	–	4	–	0	6	–	5	–	0
Washington State	3	–	5	–	0	5	–	6	–	0
Oregon	2	–	6	–	0	5	–	6	–	0
Oregon State	2	–	6	–	0	4	–	7	–	0
Stanford	2	–	6	–	0	4	–	7	–	0
+ – Conference co-champions; Rankings from AP Poll

1993 Southeastern Conference football standings
	Conf.					Overall
Team	W		L		T	W		L		T
Eastern Division
No. 5 Florida x$	7	–	1	–	0	11	–	2	–	0
No. 12 Tennessee* x	7	–	1	–	0	10	–	2	–	0
Kentucky	4	–	4	–	0	6	–	6	–	0
Georgia	2	–	6	–	0	5	–	6	–	0
South Carolina*	2	–	6	–	0	4	–	7	–	0
Vanderbilt*	1	–	7	–	0	4	–	7	–	0
Western Division
No. 4 Auburn†	8	–	0	–	0	11	–	0	–	0
No. 14 Alabama* x	5	–	3	–	0	9	–	4	–	0
Arkansas*	3	–	4	–	1	5	–	5	–	1
LSU	3	–	5	–	0	5	–	6	–	0
Ole Miss*	3	–	5	–	0	5	–	6	–	0
Mississippi State*	2	–	5	–	1	3	–	6	–	2
Championship: Florida 28, Alabama 13
$ – Conference champion; x – Division champion/co-champions; † – Ineligible for the postseason due to NCAA probation. * – Alabama later forfeited all regular-season wins and one tie due to NCAA violations, giving an official record of 1–12 overall and 0–8 SEC. The forfeit of the tie retroactively gave Tennessee a share of the East title.; Rankings from AP Poll

1993 Southwest Conference football standings
	Conf.					Overall
Team	W		L		T	W		L		T
No. 9 Texas A&M $	7	–	0	–	0	10	–	2	–	0
Texas	5	–	2	–	0	5	–	5	–	1
Texas Tech	5	–	2	–	0	6	–	6	–	0
Rice	3	–	4	–	0	6	–	5	–	0
Baylor	3	–	4	–	0	5	–	6	–	0
TCU	2	–	5	–	0	4	–	7	–	0
SMU	1	–	5	–	1	2	–	7	–	2
Houston	1	–	5	–	1	1	–	9	–	1
$ – Conference champion; Rankings from AP Poll

1993 Western Athletic Conference football standings
	Conf.					Overall
Team	W		L		T	W		L		T
Fresno State +	6	–	2	–	0	8	–	4	–	0
Wyoming +	6	–	2	–	0	8	–	4	–	0
BYU +	6	–	2	–	0	6	–	6	–	0
Utah	5	–	3	–	0	7	–	6	–	0
Colorado State	5	–	3	–	0	5	–	6	–	0
New Mexico	4	–	4	–	0	6	–	5	–	0
San Diego State	4	–	4	–	0	6	–	6	–	0
Hawaii	3	–	5	–	0	6	–	6	–	0
Air Force	1	–	7	–	0	4	–	8	–	0
UTEP	0	–	8	–	0	1	–	11	–	0
+ – Conference co-champions

1993 NCAA Division I-A independents football records
	Conf.			Overall
Team	W	L	T	W		L		T
No. 2 Notre Dame		–		11	–	1	–	0
No. 24 Louisville		–		9	–	3	–	0
Cincinnati		–		8	–	3	–	0
Army		–		6	–	5	–	0
Memphis State		–		6	–	5	–	0
Tulsa		–		4	–	6	–	1
Navy		–		4	–	7	–	0
Tulane		–		3	–	9	–	0
Southern Miss		–		2	–	8	–	1
East Carolina		–		2	–	9	–	0
Rankings from AP Poll

== I-AA team wins over I-A teams ==
Italics denotes I-AA teams.

Date	Visiting team	Home team	Site	Result	Attendance	Ref.
September 2	No. 3 (I-AA) Youngstown State	Western Michigan	Waldo Stadium • Kalamazoo, Michigan	17–13	29,084	
October 9	Cal State Northridge	UNLV	Sam Boyd Silver Bowl • Whitney, Nevada	24–18	10,380	
October 23	Weber State	Nevada	Mackay Stadium • Reno, Nevada	47–30	24,089	
November 6	No. 7 (I-AA) Northeast Louisiana	Arkansas State	Indian Stadium • Jonesboro, Arkansas	42–10		
November 20	No. 12 (I-AA) UCF	Louisiana Tech	Joe Aillet Stadium • Ruston, Louisiana	38–16	4,000	
November 20	No. 7 (I-AA) Youngstown State	Akron	Rubber Bowl • Akron, Ohio (Steel Tire)	19–0	8,000	
^{#}Rankings from AP Poll released prior to game.

== No. 1 and No. 2 progress ==
Florida State's Seminoles were the unanimous choice for No. 1 beginning with the October 19 poll and the three after that, receiving all 62 votes. After Notre Dame's 31–24 defeat of Florida State on November 13, Notre Dame got all 62 first place votes in the next poll.

WEEKS	No. 1	No. 2	Event	Date
PRE - 7	Florida State	Alabama	Tennessee 17, Alabama 17	Oct 16
8 - 11	Florida State	Notre Dame	Notre Dame 31, Florida St. 24	Nov 13
12	Notre Dame	Florida State	Boston College 41, Notre Dame 39	Nov 20
13–15	Florida State	Nebraska	Florida State 18, Nebraska 16	Jan 1

== Bowl games ==
In 1993, the Alamo Bowl played its inaugural game. Additionally, the Sunshine Classic was no longer sponsored by Blockbuster Entertainment, and was renamed the Carquest Bowl.

- Orange Bowl: No. 1 Florida State 18, No. 2 Nebraska 16
- Rose Bowl: No. 9 Wisconsin 21, No. 14 UCLA 16
- Sugar Bowl: No. 8 Florida 41, No. 3 West Virginia 7
- Cotton Bowl Classic: No. 4 Notre Dame 24, No. 7 Texas A&M 21
- Fiesta Bowl: No. 16 Arizona 29, No. 10 Miami 0
- Florida Citrus Bowl: No. 13 Penn State 31, No. 6 Tennessee 13
- Hall of Fame Bowl: No. 23 Michigan 42, NC State 7
- Carquest Bowl: No. 15 Boston College 31, Virginia 13
- Gator Bowl: No. 18 Alabama 24, No. 12 North Carolina 10
- Peach Bowl: No. 24 Clemson 14, Kentucky 13
- Alamo Bowl: California 37, Iowa 3
- Independence Bowl: No. 22 Virginia Tech 45, No. 21 Indiana 20
- Holiday Bowl: No. 11 Ohio State 28, BYU 21
- Freedom Bowl: USC 28, Utah 21
- Copper Bowl: No. 20 Kansas State 52, Wyoming 17
- Liberty Bowl: No. 25 Louisville 18, Michigan State 7
- Aloha Bowl: No. 17 Colorado 41, No. 25 Fresno St 30
- John Hancock Bowl: No. 19 Oklahoma 41, Texas Tech 10
- Las Vegas Bowl: Utah State 42, Ball State 33

== Final rankings ==
=== Final AP Poll ===
1. Florida State
2. Notre Dame
3. Nebraska
4. Auburn
5. Florida
6. Wisconsin
7. West Virginia
8. Penn State
9. Texas A&M
10. Arizona
11. Ohio State
12. Tennessee
13. Boston College
14. Alabama
15. Miami (FL)
16. Colorado
17. Oklahoma
18. UCLA
19. North Carolina
20. Kansas State
21. Michigan
22. Virginia Tech
23. Clemson
24. Louisville
25. California

=== Final Coaches Poll ===
1. Florida St.
2. Notre Dame
3. Nebraska
4. Florida
5. Wisconsin
6. West Virginia
7. Penn St.
8. Texas A&M
9. Arizona
10. Ohio St.
11. Tennessee
12. Boston College
13. Alabama
14. Oklahoma
15. Miami (FL)
16. Colorado
17. UCLA
18. Kansas St.
19. Michigan
20. Virginia Tech
21. North Carolina
22. Clemson
23. Louisville
24. California
25. Southern California

== Awards and honors ==
=== Heisman Trophy voting ===
The Heisman Trophy is given to the year's most outstanding player

Player	School	Position	1st	2nd	3rd	Total
Charlie Ward	Florida State	QB	740	39	12	2,310
Heath Shuler	Tennessee	QB	10	274	110	688
David Palmer	Alabama	WR	16	78	88	292
Marshall Faulk	San Diego State	RB	7	74	81	250
Glenn Foley	Boston College	QB	5	47	71	180
LeShon Johnson	Northern Illinois	RB	5	51	59	176
J. J. Stokes	UCLA	WR	3	37	48	131
Tyrone Wheatley	Michigan	RB	2	31	32	100
Trent Dilfer	Fresno State	QB	2	28	29	91
Eric Zeier	Georgia	QB	0	24	37	85

=== Other major awards ===
- Maxwell Award (College Player of the Year) - Charlie Ward, Florida State
- Walter Camp Award (Back) - Charlie Ward, Florida State
- Davey O'Brien Award (Quarterback) - Charlie Ward, Florida State
- Doak Walker Award (Running back) - Byron Morris, Texas Tech
- Dick Butkus Award (Linebacker) - Trev Alberts, Nebraska
- Lombardi Award (Lineman or linebacker) - Aaron Taylor, Notre Dame
- Outland Trophy (Interior lineman) - Rob Waldrop, NG, Arizona
- Jim Thorpe Award (Defensive back) - Antonio Langham, Alabama
- AFCA Coach of the Year - Terry Bowden, Auburn
- FWAA Coach of the Year - Terry Bowden, Auburn

== Coaching changes ==
=== Preseason and in-season ===
School	Outgoing coach	Date	Reason	Replacement
Houston	John Jenkins	April 30	resigned	Kim Helton
NC State	Dick Sheridan	June 29	resigned	Mike O'Cain
Washington	Don James	August 22	resigned	Jim Lambright
UTEP	David Lee	October 17	fired	Charlie Bailey

== Attendances ==
Average home attendance top 3:

Rank	Team	Average
1	Michigan Wolverines	105,660
2	Tennessee Volunteers	95,326
3	Penn State Nittany Lions	94,032
