= 1993 Kentucky Wildcats football team =

American college football season

1993 Kentucky Wildcats football
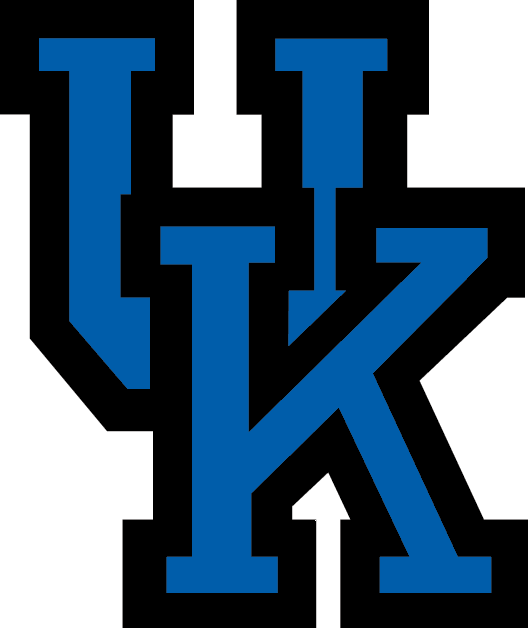

Peach Bowl, L 13–14 vs. Clemson
- Conference: Southeastern Conference
- Eastern Division
- Record: 6–6 (4–4 SEC)
- Head coach: Bill Curry (4th season)
- Offensive coordinator: Daryl Dickey (1st season)
- Offensive scheme: Multiple
- Defensive coordinator: Mike Archer (1st season)
- Base defense: 4–3
- Home stadium: Commonwealth Stadium

1993 Southeastern Conference football standings
| | Conf. | | | | | Overall |
| Team | W | | L | | T | W | | L | | T |
|---|---|---|---|---|---|---|---|---|---|---|
Eastern Division
| No. 5 Florida x$ | 7 | – | 1 | – | 0 | 11 | – | 2 | – | 0 |
| No. 12 Tennessee* x | 7 | – | 1 | – | 0 | 10 | – | 2 | – | 0 |
| Kentucky | 4 | – | 4 | – | 0 | 6 | – | 6 | – | 0 |
| Georgia | 2 | – | 6 | – | 0 | 5 | – | 6 | – | 0 |
| South Carolina* | 2 | – | 6 | – | 0 | 4 | – | 7 | – | 0 |
| Vanderbilt* | 1 | – | 7 | – | 0 | 4 | – | 7 | – | 0 |
Western Division
| No. 4 Auburn† | 8 | – | 0 | – | 0 | 11 | – | 0 | – | 0 |
| No. 14 Alabama* x | 5 | – | 2 | – | 1 | 9 | – | 3 | – | 1 |
| Arkansas* | 3 | – | 4 | – | 1 | 5 | – | 5 | – | 1 |
| LSU | 3 | – | 5 | – | 0 | 5 | – | 6 | – | 0 |
| Ole Miss* | 3 | – | 5 | – | 0 | 5 | – | 6 | – | 0 |
| Mississippi State* | 2 | – | 5 | – | 1 | 3 | – | 6 | – | 2 |
Championship: Florida 28, Alabama 13
$ – Conference champion; x – Division champion/co-champions; † – Ineligible for the postseason due to NCAA probation. * – Alabama later forfeited all regular-season wins and one tie due to NCAA violations, giving an official record of 1–12 overall and 0–8 SEC. The forfeit of the tie retroactively gave Tennessee a share of the East title.; Rankings from AP Poll

The 1993 Kentucky Wildcats football team represented the University of Kentucky in the 1993 NCAA Division I-A football season. The Wildcats scored 207 points while allowing 195 points. Kentucky played in the 1993 Peach Bowl.

Kentucky opened with a 35–0 win over Kent State. Kentucky then lost to #7 Florida on a touchdown play at the end of the game, 24–20. A 24–8 loss at Indiana followed. Kentucky then won a nationally televised ESPN Thursday night matchup at South Carolina, 21–17, followed by a 21–0 shutout of #25 Ole Miss.

A 35–17 victory over LSU followed. Kentucky then lost 33–28 at Georgia in a nationally televised game. Kentucky then won 26–17 at Mississippi State, lost 12–7 at Vanderbilt, and clinched bowl eligibility with a 6–3 win against East Carolina. A 48–0 loss to Tennessee closed the regular season.

Kentucky closed the season in the 1993 Peach Bowl against #24 Clemson. Kentucky led for most of the game but lost on a late touchdown, 14–13.

== Schedule ==
| Date | Time | Opponent | Site | TV | Result | Attendance | Source |
|---|---|---|---|---|---|---|---|
| September 4 | 7:00 p.m. | Kent State* | Commonwealth Stadium; Lexington, KY | | W 35–0 | 55,800 | |
| September 11 | 7:00 p.m. | No. 7 Florida | Commonwealth Stadium; Lexington, KY (rivalry) | PPV | L 20–24 | 58,175 | |
| September 18 | 1:00 p.m. | at Indiana* | Memorial Stadium; Bloomington, IN (rivalry) | | L 8–24 | 43,545 | |
| September 23 | 7:45 p.m. | at South Carolina | Williams–Brice Stadium; Columbia, SC | ESPN | W 21–17 | 65,326 | |
| October 2 | 7:00 p.m. | No. 25 Ole Miss | Commonwealth Stadium; Lexington, KY | ESPN | W 21–0 | 57,075 | |
| October 16 | 7:00 p.m. | LSU | Commonwealth Stadium; Lexington, KY | | W 35–17 | 54,750 | |
| October 23 | 12:30 p.m. | at Georgia | Sanford Stadium; Athens, GA | JPS | L 28–33 | 81,307 | |
| October 30 | 2:00 p.m. | at Mississippi State | Scott Field; Starkville, MS | | W 26–17 | 28,607 | |
| November 6 | 2:00 p.m. | at Vanderbilt | Vanderbilt Stadium; Nashville, TN (rivalry) | | L 7–12 | 35,000 | |
| November 13 | 1:00 p.m. | East Carolina* | Commonwealth Stadium; Lexington, KY | | W 6–3 | 34,500 | |
| November 20 | 4:00 p.m. | No. 7 Tennessee | Commonwealth Stadium; Lexington, KY | ESPN | L 0–48 | 57,878 | |
| December 31 | 6:00 p.m. | vs. No. 24 Clemson* | Georgia Dome; Atlanta, GA (Peach Bowl) | ESPN | L 13–14 | 63,416 | |
*Non-conference game; Rankings from AP Poll released prior to the game; All times are in Eastern time

== Personnel ==
1993 Kentucky Wildcats football team roster
Players
Coaches
Offense

| Pos. | # | Name | Class |
|---|---|---|---|
| OT | 76 | Mark Askin | Jr |
| WR | 86 | Alfonzo Browning | Sr |
| WR | 95 | Tim Calvert | Sr |
| WR | 81 | Mark Chatmon | Sr |
| RB | | Donnell Gordon |
| WR | 22 | Troy Hobbs | Sr |
| FB | 31 | Damon Hood | Jr |
| C | 52 | Wes Jackson | Sr |
| QB | | Pookie Jones |
| RB | | Ray McLaurin |
| QB | | Antonio O'Ferral |
| OL | | Chris Page |
| G | 64 | David Parks | Sr |
| OL | | Aaron Purdie |
| RB | | Donnie Redd |
| TE | | Corey Reeves |
| RB | | Matt Riazzi |
| G | 55 | Barry Rich | Jr |
| RB | | Clyde Rudolph |
| TE | 44 | Terry Samuels | Sr |
| WR | | Jaysuma Simms |
| WR | | Leon Smith |
| QB | 11 | Jeff Speedy | Fr |
| RB | | Moe Williams |
| RB | | Michael Woodfork |
| RB | | Randy Wyatt |

Defense

| Pos. | # | Name | Class |
|---|---|---|---|
| DE | 59 | Zane Beehn | Sr |
| CB | 33 | Willie Cannon | Jr |
| DL | | Howard Carter |
| DT | 92 | Jon Collins | Sr |
| LB | | Darryl Conn |
| CB | 14 | Steven Hall | So |
| S | | Marcus Jenkins | Sr |
| FS | 25 | Melvin Johnson | Jr |
| DL | | Billy Lofton |
| LB | 45 | Marty Moore | Sr |
| DB | | Don Robinson |
| DB | | Adrian Sherwood |
| LB | | David Snardon |
| DL | | Robert Stinson |
| LB | 2 | Duce Williams | Sr |

Special teams

| Pos. | # | Name | Class |
|---|---|---|---|
| P | 18 | Dan Ariza | Jr |
| K | 96 | Juha Leonoff | Jr |

Head coach

- Bill Curry

Coordinators/assistant coaches

Legend

- (C) Team captain
- (S) Suspended
- (I) Ineligible
- Injured
- Redshirt

== Team players in the 1994 NFL draft ==
| Player | Position | Round | Pick | NFL club |
|---|---|---|---|---|
| Terry Samuels | Tight end | 6 | 172 | Arizona Cardinals |
| Zane Beehn | Defensive end | 7 | 207 | San Diego Chargers |
| Marty Moore | Linebacker | 7 | 222 | New England Patriots |
