= Terry Dean =

American gridiron football player (born 1971)

No. 12
- Position: Quarterback

Personal information
- Born: January 11, 1971 (age 55); Naples, Florida, U.S.
- Listed height: 6 ft 2 in (1.88 m)
- Listed weight: 210 lb (95 kg)

Career information
- High school: Naples (FL) Barron G. Collier
- College: Florida
- NFL draft: 1995: undrafted

Career history
- Winnipeg Blue Bombers (1995); Florida Bobcats (1996); Rhein Fire (1996)

Career CFL statistics
- TD–INT: 0–3
- Passing yards: 109

Career AFL statistics
- TD–INT: 2–1
- Passing yards: 69
- Stats at ArenaFan.com

Terry Dean (born January 11, 1971) is an American former professional football quarterback in the Canadian Football League (CFL), Arena Football League (AFL) and World League of American Football (WLAF). He played college football at Florida. Dean played for the Winnipeg Blue Bombers of the CFL, Florida Bobcats of the AFL and the Rhein Fire of the WLAF.
