= 1993 Alamo Bowl =

1993 Builders Square Alamo Bowl
- Inaugural edition
California Golden Bears	Iowa Hawkeyes
(8–4)	(6–5)
Pacific-10	Big Ten
37	3
Head coach: Keith Gilbertson	Head coach: Hayden Fry
	1	2	3	4	Total
California	6	17	7	7	37
Iowa	0	0	3	0	3
- Date: December 31, 1993
- Season: 1993
- Stadium: Alamodome
- Location: San Antonio, Texas
- Favorite: California by 6 to 11 points
- Referee: Gene Wurtz (WAC)
- Attendance: 45,716

United States TV coverage
- Network: ESPN
- Announcers: Sean McDonough, Todd Blackledge, Dave Sims

The 1993 Alamo Bowl was the inaugural edition of the college football bowl game and featured the California Golden Bears of the Pacific-10 Conference and the Iowa Hawkeyes of the Big Ten Conference.

Part of the 1993–94 bowl schedule, it was played on New Year's Eve at the Alamodome in San Antonio, Texas. Held on Friday night, it was televised by ESPN and kicked off shortly after 8:30 p.m. CST. Favored California won in a rout, 37–3.

== Teams ==
The bowl had planned to feature the third place team from the Texas-based Southwest Conference (SWC) against the fourth place team from the Pacific-10 Conference.

However, only two of the SWC's eight teams (Texas A&M and Texas Tech) reached the necessary six wins for bowl eligibility, and those teams were committed to the Cotton Bowl and the Hancock Bowl (Sun Bowl), respectively. Texas had played a rigorous non-conference schedule, going 0–3–1, and finished with an ineligible 5–5–1 record.

Bowl officials subsequently invited Iowa, who had finished eighth in the Big Ten, but won their final four games for a bowl-eligible 6–5 record.

Washington finished fourth in the Pac-10 with a conference record of 5–3, but was ineligible, due to conference sanctions. California and Arizona State were tied behind Washington, with 4–4 conference records. Bowl officials unanimously decided to invite California (8–4) over the Sun Devils (6–5).

== Game summary ==
Cal placekicker Doug Brien connected on field goals of 37 and 20 yards in the first quarter, as Cal took a 6–0 lead at the end of the first quarter. In the second quarter, Brien's third field goal, a 30 yarder gave Cal a 9–0 lead. Cal quarterback Dave Barr threw a 6-yard touchdown pass to Mike Caldwell as Cal went up 16–0. A 61-yard interception return by linebacker Jerrot Willard gave Cal a 23–0 lead at halftime.

In the third quarter, Iowa's Brion Hurley kicked a 42-yard field goal to get the Hawkeyes on the scoreboard at 23–3. Barr threw a 34-yard touchdown pass to Iheanyi Uwaezuoke to take a 30–3 lead after three quarters. He added a 12-yard touchdown pass to Brian Remington in the fourth quarter to extend the lead to 37–3, the final score.

With the win, California improved to 9–4 and was ranked #25 in the final AP poll.
