= 1993 Oklahoma Sooners football team =

American college football season

1993 Oklahoma Sooners football

John Hancock Bowl champion

John Hancock Bowl, W 41–10 vs. Texas Tech
- Conference: Big Eight Conference

Ranking
- Coaches: No. 14
- AP: No. 17
- Record: 9–3 (4–3 Big 8)
- Head coach: Gary Gibbs (5th season)
- Offensive coordinator: Watson Brown (1st season)
- Offensive scheme: Multiple
- Defensive coordinator: Tom Hayes (3rd season)
- Base defense: 5–2
- Captains: Aubrey Beavers; Mike Coats; Cale Gundy; Corey Warren
- Home stadium: Oklahoma Memorial Stadium

1993 Big Eight Conference football standings
	Conf.					Overall
Team	W		L		T	W		L		T
No. 3 Nebraska $	7	–	0	–	0	11	–	1	–	0
No. 16 Colorado	5	–	1	–	1	8	–	3	–	1
No. 20 Kansas State	4	–	2	–	1	9	–	2	–	1
No. 17 Oklahoma %	4	–	3	–	0	9	–	3	–	0
Kansas	3	–	4	–	0	5	–	7	–	0
Missouri	2	–	5	–	0	3	–	7	–	1
Iowa State	2	–	5	–	0	3	–	8	–	0
Oklahoma State	0	–	7	–	0	3	–	8	–	0
$ – Bowl Coalition representative as champion % – Bowl Coalition at-large representative; Rankings from AP Poll

The 1993 Oklahoma Sooners football team represented the University of Oklahoma during the 1993 NCAA Division I-A football season. They played their home games at Oklahoma Memorial Stadium and competed as members of the Big Eight Conference. They were coached by fifth-year head coach Gary Gibbs.

== Schedule ==
Date	Time	Opponent	Rank	Site	TV	Result	Attendance
September 4	7:05 p.m.	at TCU*	No. 21	Amon G. Carter Stadium; Fort Worth, TX	PPV	W 35–3	40,418
September 11	2:30 p.m.	No. 5 Texas A&M*	No. 17	Oklahoma Memorial Stadium; Norman, OK	ABC	W 44–14	68,211
September 25	1:30 p.m.	Tulsa*	No. 10	Oklahoma Memorial Stadium; Norman, OK		W 41–20	67,121
October 2	1:00 p.m.	at Iowa State	No. 10	Cyclone Stadium; Ames, IA	PPV	W 24–7	37,281
October 9	2:30 p.m.	vs. Texas*	No. 10	Cotton Bowl; Dallas, TX (Red River Shootout)	ABC	W 38–17	75,587
October 16	2:30 p.m.	No. 20 Colorado	No. 9	Oklahoma Memorial Stadium; Norman, OK	ABC	L 10–27	64,213
October 23	1:30 p.m.	Kansas	No. 17	Oklahoma Memorial Stadium; Norman, OK		W 38–23	60,411
October 30	1:10 p.m.	at No. 25 Kansas State	No. 14	KSU Stadium; Manhattan, KS	PPV	L 7–21	31,569
November 6	1:00 p.m.	at Missouri	No. 20	Faurot Field; Columbia, MO (rivalry)	PSN	W 42–23	31,438
November 13	1:30 p.m.	Oklahoma State	No. 17	Oklahoma Memorial Stadium; Norman, OK (Bedlam Series)	PSN	W 31–0	65,275
November 26	2:30 p.m.	at No. 2 Nebraska	No. 16	Memorial Stadium; Lincoln, NE (rivalry)	ABC	L 7–21	75,674
December 24	1:30 p.m.	vs. Texas Tech*	No. 19	Sun Bowl; El Paso, TX (John Hancock Bowl)	CBS	W 41–10	43,848
*Non-conference game; Rankings from AP Poll released prior to the game; All times are in Central time

== Rankings ==
Ranking movements Legend: ██ Increase in ranking ██ Decrease in ranking
	Week																
Poll	Pre	1	2	3	4	5	6	7	8	9	10	11	12	13	14	15	Final
AP	22	21	17	12	10	10	10	9	17	14	20	17	15	16	19	19	17
Coaches Poll	21	19	16	13	10	9	9	8	17	13	20	17	14	15	17	16	14

== Season summary ==
=== vs Texas ===
#10 Oklahoma Sooners vs. Texas Longhorns

Team	1	2	3	4	Total
• #10 Oklahoma	3	7	14	14	38
Texas	0	3	7	7	17

- Date: October 9
- Location: Cotton Bowl, Dallas
- Game start: 2:30 PM CDT
- Game weather: 75,587
- Television network: ABC

Scoring summary
Q1	OKLA	Blanton 22 yard field goal	OKLA 3–0
Q2	OKLA	Moore 9 yard run (Blanton kick)	OKLA 10–0
Q2	TEX	Szeredy 22 yard field goal	OKLA 10–3
Q3	OKLA	Gundy 18 yard run (Blanton kick)	OKLA 17–3
Q3	TEX	Adams 41 yard pass from Morenz (Szeredy kick)	OKLA 17–10
Q3	OKLA	Gundy 1 yard run (Blanton kick)	OKLA 24–10
Q4	OKLA	Chandler 3 yard run (Blanton kick)	OKLA 31–10
Q4	TEX	Adams 12 yard pass from Morenz (Szeredy kick)	OKLA 31–17
Q4	OKLA	Gundy 3 yard run (Blanton kick)	OKLA 38–17

=== at Kansas State ===
Team	1	2	3	4	Total
Oklahoma	0	0	0	7	7
• Kansas State	0	7	14	0	21

- Date: October 30
- Location: KSU Stadium, Manhattan, Kansas
- Game attendance: 31,569

Scoring summary
Q2	KSU	Running 6 yard pass from May (Wright kick)	KSU 7–0
Q3	KSU	Lockett 22 yard pass from May (Wright kick)	KSU 14–0
Q3	KSU	May 2 yard run (Wright kick)	KSU 21–0
Q4	OKLA	Mills 31 yard pass from Gundy (Blanton kick)	KSU 21–7

- KSU: Schiller 19 Rush, 111 Yds

=== Oklahoma State ===
External videos
- 1993 Oklahoma State at Oklahoma - game highlights

=== at Nebraska ===
Oklahoma at Nebraska

Team	1	2	3	4	Total
#16 Oklahoma	7	0	0	0	7
• #2 Nebraska	0	7	0	14	21

- Date: November 26
- Location: Memorial Stadium, Lincoln, Nebraska
- Game attendance: 75,674
- Television network: ABC

=== John Hancock Bowl (vs Texas Tech) ===
Texas Tech vs. Oklahoma

Team	1	2	3	4	Total
Texas Tech	0	3	7	0	10
• #19 Oklahoma	14	14	0	13	41

- Date: December 24
- Location: Sun Bowl, El Paso, Texas
- Game attendance: 43,848
- Television network: CBS

== Roster ==
1993 Oklahoma Sooners football team roster
Players
Coaches
Offense

Pos.	#	Name	Class
RB	25	James Allen	Fr
TE	86	Rickey Brady	Sr
QB		Terence Brown
OL		Joe Carollo
OL		Ben Cavil
RB		Dwayne Chandler
RB		Terry Collier
OL		J.R. Conrad
QB	12	Cale Gundy (C)	Sr
WR		Albert Hall
SE	17	P. J. Mills	So
RB	7	Jerald Moore	Fr
OL		Milton Overton
WR		JaJuan Penny
OL		Broderick Robinson
OL		Harry Stamps
RB		Michael Thompson
WR		Corey Warren (C)

Defense

Pos.	#	Name	Class
DL		Russell Allen
S	39	John Anderson	Jr
DE	72	Aubrey Beavers (C)	Sr
DB		Artie Burns
DB		Larry Bush
DL		David Campbell
LB		Mike Coats (C)
DL		Joe Correia
LB		Brent DeQuasie
LB		Mario Freeman
LB		Tremayne Green
DB		Rod Henderson
LB		Kyle Hill
CB	42	Darrius Johnson	So
DE	57	Cedric Jones	So
LB		Collin Rosenberg
DB		William Shankle
DB		Maylon Wesley
DL		Ricky Wren

Special teams

Pos.	#	Name	Class
K	16	Scott Blanton	Jr

Head coach

- Gary Gibbs

Coordinators/assistant coaches

- Watson Brown – Offensive coordinator
- Mike Jones – Running backs
- Clarence James – Wide receivers
- Charley North – Tight ends and special teams
- Tom Hayes – Defensive coordinator
- Kevin Wolthausen – Defensive line
- Lucious Selmon – Outside linebacker and defensive end
- Johnny Barr – Linebackers
- Clancy Pendergast – Graduate assistant

Legend

- (C) Team captain
- (S) Suspended
- (I) Ineligible
- Injured
- Redshirt

Roster

== NFL draft ==
The following players were selected into the 1994 NFL draft following the season.

Round	Pick	Player	Position	NFL team
2	54	Aubrey Beavers	Linebacker	Miami Dolphins
6	167	Rickey Brady	Tight end	Los Angeles Rams
