= 1993 Colorado Buffaloes football team =

American college football season

1993 Colorado Buffaloes football

Aloha Bowl champion

Aloha Bowl, W 41–30 vs. Fresno State
- Conference: Big Eight Conference

Ranking
- Coaches: No. 16
- AP: No. 16
- Record: 8–3–1 (5–1–1 Big 8)
- Head coach: Bill McCartney (12th season)
- Offensive coordinator: Elliot Uzelac (1st season)
- Offensive scheme: Single set back
- Defensive coordinator: Mike Hankwitz (6th season)
- Base defense: 3–4
- MVP: Charles Johnson
- Captains: Charles Johnson; Ron Woolfork
- Home stadium: Folsom Field

1993 Big Eight Conference football standings
	Conf.					Overall
Team	W		L		T	W		L		T
No. 3 Nebraska $	7	–	0	–	0	11	–	1	–	0
No. 16 Colorado	5	–	1	–	1	8	–	3	–	1
No. 20 Kansas State	4	–	2	–	1	9	–	2	–	1
No. 17 Oklahoma %	4	–	3	–	0	9	–	3	–	0
Kansas	3	–	4	–	0	5	–	7	–	0
Missouri	2	–	5	–	0	3	–	7	–	1
Iowa State	2	–	5	–	0	3	–	8	–	0
Oklahoma State	0	–	7	–	0	3	–	8	–	0
$ – Bowl Coalition representative as champion % – Bowl Coalition at-large representative; Rankings from AP Poll

The 1993 Colorado Buffaloes football team represented the University of Colorado at Boulder as a member of the Big Eight Conference during the 1993 NCAA Division I FBS football season. Led by 12th-year year head coach Bill McCartney, the Buffaloes compiled an overall record of 8–3–1 in a mark of 5–1–1 in conference play, placing second in the Big 8. Colorado was invited to the Aloha Bowl, where the Buffalos defeated Fresno State. The team was ranked No. 16 in the final AP poll and the final Coaches Poll. Colorado played home games at Folsom Field in Boulder, Colorado.

== Schedule ==
Date	Time	Opponent	Rank	Site	TV	Result	Attendance
September 4	5:30 pm	Texas*	No. 11	Folsom Field; Boulder, Colorado	ESPN	W 36–14	52,125
September 11	12:00 pm	No. 24 Baylor*	No. 10	Folsom Field; Boulder, CO	KCNC	W 45–21	50,281
September 18	9:30 pm	at No. 20 Stanford*	No. 7	Stanford Stadium; Stanford, CA	ESPN	L 37–41	52,100
September 25	1:30 pm	No. 3 Miami (FL)*	No. 13	Folsom Field; Boulder, CO	ABC	L 29–35	52,391
October 9	12:00 pm	Missouri	No. 20	Folsom Field; Boulder, CO	KCNC	W 30–18	52,147
October 16	1:30 pm	at No. 9 Oklahoma	No. 20	Oklahoma Memorial Stadium; Norman, OK	ABC	W 27–10	64,213
October 23	12:10 pm	at Kansas State	No. 16	KSU Stadium; Manhattan, KS (rivalry)	KCNC	T 16–16	33,728
October 30	1:30 pm	No. 6 Nebraska	No. 20	Folsom Field; Boulder, CO (rivalry)	ABC	L 17–21	52,277
November 6	1:00 pm	at Oklahoma State	No. 23	Lewis Field; Stillwater, OK	KCNC	W 31–14	30,200
November 13	12:00 pm	Kansas^{†}	No. 21	Folsom Field; Boulder, CO	KCNC	W 38–14	52,139
November 20	12:00 pm	at Iowa State	No. 18	Cyclone Stadium; Ames, IA	KCNC	W 21–16	23,797
December 25	3:30 pm	vs. No. 25 Fresno State*	No. 17	Aloha Stadium; Halawa, HI (Aloha Bowl)	ABC	W 41–30	44,009
*Non-conference game; ^{†}Homecoming; Rankings from AP Poll released prior to the game; All times are in Mountain time

== Game summaries ==
=== Missouri ===
Team	1	2	3	4	Total
Tigers	0	3	0	15	18
• Buffaloes	3	10	14	3	30

- Date: October 9
- Location: Folsom Field

Scoring summary
Q1	COL	Berger 25 yard field goal	COL 3–0
Q2	MU	Pooler 23 yard field goal	Tie 3–3
Q2	COL	Warren 28 yard pass from Stewart (Berger kick)	COL 10–3
Q2	COL	Berger 23 yard field goal	COL 13–3
Q3	COL	Stewart 1 yard run (Berger kick)	COL 20–3
Q3	COL	Warren 12 yard run (Berger kick)	COL 27–3
Q4	MU	Holly 17 yard pass from Handy (Ofodile pass from Handy)	COL 27–11
Q4	COL	Berger 32 yard field goal	COL 30–11
Q4	MU	Ofodile 11 yard pass from Handy (Pooler kick)	COL 30–18

=== No. 6 Nebraska ===
Team	1	2	3	4	Total
• No. 6 Cornhuskers	21	0	0	0	21
No. 20 Buffaloes	3	7	0	7	17

- Date: October 30
- Location: Folsom Field, Boulder, Colorado
- Game attendance: 52,277

== Roster ==
1993 Colorado Buffaloes football team roster
Players
Coaches
Offense

Pos.	#	Name	Class
TE	88	Christian Fauria	Jr
RB	19	Rashaan Salaam	So
QB	10	Kordell Stewart	Jr
C	64	Bryan Stoltenberg	So
WR	12	Michael Westbrook	Jr

Defense

Pos.	#	Name	Class
LB	46	Ted Johnson	Jr
CB	47	Chris Hudson	Jr
DT	92	Shannon Clavelle	So
DT	93	Darius Holland	Jr

Special teams

Pos.	#	Name	Class
K	17	Mitch Berger	Sr

Head coach

- Bill McCartney

Coordinators/assistant coaches

Legend

- (C) Team captain
- (S) Suspended
- (I) Ineligible
- Injured
- Redshirt
