= 1993 Nebraska Cornhuskers football team =

American college football season

1993 Nebraska Cornhuskers football

Big 8 champion

Orange Bowl (BC NCG), L 16–18 vs. Florida State
- Conference: Big Eight Conference

Ranking
- Coaches: No. 3
- AP: No. 3
- Record: 11–1 (7–0 Big 8)
- Head coach: Tom Osborne (21st season)
- Offensive scheme: I formation
- Defensive coordinator: Charlie McBride (13th season)
- Base defense: 4–3
- Home stadium: Memorial Stadium

1993 Big Eight Conference football standings
| | Conf. | | | | | Overall |
| Team | W | | L | | T | W | | L | | T |
|---|---|---|---|---|---|---|---|---|---|---|
| No. 3 Nebraska $ | 7 | – | 0 | – | 0 | 11 | – | 1 | – | 0 |
| No. 16 Colorado | 5 | – | 1 | – | 1 | 8 | – | 3 | – | 1 |
| No. 20 Kansas State | 4 | – | 2 | – | 1 | 9 | – | 2 | – | 1 |
| No. 17 Oklahoma % | 4 | – | 3 | – | 0 | 9 | – | 3 | – | 0 |
| Kansas | 3 | – | 4 | – | 0 | 5 | – | 7 | – | 0 |
| Missouri | 2 | – | 5 | – | 0 | 3 | – | 7 | – | 1 |
| Iowa State | 2 | – | 5 | – | 0 | 3 | – | 8 | – | 0 |
| Oklahoma State | 0 | – | 7 | – | 0 | 3 | – | 8 | – | 0 |
$ – Bowl Coalition representative as champion % – Bowl Coalition at-large representative; Rankings from AP Poll

The 1993 Nebraska Cornhuskers football team represented the University of Nebraska–Lincoln in the 1993 NCAA Division I-A football season. The team was coached by Tom Osborne and played their home games in Memorial Stadium in Lincoln, Nebraska.

== Schedule ==
| Date | Time | Opponent | Rank | Site | TV | Result | Attendance | Source |
|---|---|---|---|---|---|---|---|---|
| September 4 | 1:00 pm | North Texas* | No. 9 | Memorial Stadium; Lincoln, NE | | W 76–14 | 75,614 | |
| September 11 | 1:00 pm | Texas Tech* | No. 9 | Memorial Stadium; Lincoln, NE | | W 50–27 | 75,771 | |
| September 18 | 2:30 pm | at UCLA* | No. 8 | Rose Bowl; Pasadena, CA | ABC | W 14–13 | 50,299 | |
| September 25 | 1:00 pm | Colorado State* | No. 6 | Memorial Stadium; Lincoln, NE | | W 48–13 | 75,625 | |
| October 7 | 7:00 pm | at Oklahoma State | No. 7 | Lewis Field; Stillwater, OK | ESPN | W 27–13 | 35,580 | |
| October 16 | 1:00 pm | Kansas State^{†} | No. 6 | Memorial Stadium; Lincoln, NE (rivalry) | Prime | W 45–28 | 75,721 | |
| October 23 | 1:00 pm | Missouri | No. 5 | Memorial Stadium; Lincoln, NE (rivalry) | | W 49–7 | 75,574 | |
| October 30 | 2:30 pm | at No. 20 Colorado | No. 6 | Folsom Field; Boulder, CO (rivalry) | ABC | W 21–17 | 52,277 | |
| November 6 | 1:00 pm | at Kansas | No. 6 | Memorial Stadium; Lawrence, KS (rivalry) | | W 21–20 | 47,500 | |
| November 13 | 1:00 pm | Iowa State | No. 4 | Memorial Stadium; Lincoln, NE (rivalry) | | W 49–17 | 75,513 | |
| November 26 | 2:30 pm | No. 16 Oklahoma | No. 2 | Memorial Stadium; Lincoln, NE (rivalry) | ABC | W 21–7 | 75,674 | |
| January 1, 1994 | 7:00 pm | vs. No. 1 Florida State* | No. 2 | Miami Orange Bowl; Miami, FL (Orange Bowl) | NBC | L 16–18 | 81,536 | |
*Non-conference game; ^{†}Homecoming; Rankings from AP Poll released prior to the game; All times are in Central time

== Rankings ==
Ranking movements Legend: ██ Increase in ranking ██ Decrease in ranking
| | Week | | | | | | | | | | | | | | | | |
| Poll | Pre | 1 | 2 | 3 | 4 | 5 | 6 | 7 | 8 | 9 | 10 | 11 | 12 | 13 | 14 | 15 | Final |
|---|---|---|---|---|---|---|---|---|---|---|---|---|---|---|---|---|---|
| AP | 8 | 9 | 9 | 8 | 6 | 6 | 7 | 6 | 5 | 6 | 6 | 4 | 3 | 2 | 2 | 2 | 3 |
| Coaches | | | | | | | | | | | | | | 1 | 1 | 1 | 3 |

== Game summaries ==
=== North Texas ===
North Texas at Nebraska [box score]

| Team | 1 | 2 | 3 | 4 | Total |
|---|---|---|---|---|---|
| North Texas | 0 | 7 | 7 | 0 | 14 |
| • Nebraska | 28 | 14 | 21 | 13 | 76 |

- Date: September 4
- Location: Memorial Stadium, Lincoln, NE
- Game attendance: 75,614

=== Texas Tech ===
Texas Tech at Nebraska [box score]

| Team | 1 | 2 | 3 | 4 | Total |
|---|---|---|---|---|---|
| Texas Tech | 7 | 7 | 7 | 6 | 27 |
| • Nebraska | 10 | 10 | 16 | 14 | 50 |

- Date: September 11
- Location: Memorial Stadium, Lincoln, NE
- Game attendance: 75,771

=== UCLA ===
Nebraska at UCLA [box score]

| Team | 1 | 2 | 3 | 4 | Total |
|---|---|---|---|---|---|
| • Nebraska | 0 | 7 | 7 | 0 | 14 |
| UCLA | 3 | 7 | 0 | 3 | 13 |

- Date: September 18
- Location: Rose Bowl, Pasadena, CA
- Game attendance: 50,299

=== Colorado State ===
Colorado State at Nebraska [box score]

| Team | 1 | 2 | 3 | 4 | Total |
|---|---|---|---|---|---|
| Colorado State | 3 | 3 | 0 | 7 | 13 |
| • Nebraska | 14 | 14 | 6 | 14 | 48 |

- Date: September 25
- Location: Memorial Stadium, Lincoln, NE
- Game attendance: 75,625

=== Oklahoma State ===
Nebraska at Oklahoma State [box score]

| Team | 1 | 2 | 3 | 4 | Total |
|---|---|---|---|---|---|
| • Nebraska | 0 | 6 | 7 | 14 | 27 |
| Oklahoma State | 6 | 7 | 0 | 0 | 13 |

- Date: October 7
- Location: Lewis Field, Stillwater, OK
- Game attendance: 35,580

=== Kansas State ===
Kansas State at Nebraska [box score]

| Team | 1 | 2 | 3 | 4 | Total |
|---|---|---|---|---|---|
| Kansas State | 7 | 7 | 7 | 7 | 28 |
| • Nebraska | 14 | 17 | 0 | 14 | 45 |

- Date: October 16
- Location: Memorial Stadium, Lincoln, NE
- Game attendance: 75,721

=== Missouri ===
Missouri at Nebraska [box score]

| Team | 1 | 2 | 3 | 4 | Total |
|---|---|---|---|---|---|
| Missouri | 0 | 7 | 0 | 0 | 7 |
| • Nebraska | 0 | 21 | 14 | 14 | 49 |

- Date: October 23
- Location: Memorial Stadium, Lincoln, NE
- Game attendance: 75,574

=== Colorado ===
Nebraska at Colorado [box score]

| Team | 1 | 2 | 3 | 4 | Total |
|---|---|---|---|---|---|
| • Nebraska | 21 | 0 | 0 | 0 | 21 |
| Colorado | 3 | 7 | 0 | 7 | 17 |

- Date: October 30
- Location: Folsom Field, Boulder, CO
- Game attendance: 52,277

=== Kansas ===
Nebraska at Kansas [box score]

| Team | 1 | 2 | 3 | 4 | Total |
|---|---|---|---|---|---|
| • Nebraska | 7 | 7 | 0 | 7 | 21 |
| Kansas | 7 | 0 | 7 | 6 | 20 |

- Date: November 6
- Location: Memorial Stadium, Lawrence, KS
- Game attendance: 47,500

=== Iowa State ===
Iowa State at Nebraska [box score]

| Team | 1 | 2 | 3 | 4 | Total |
|---|---|---|---|---|---|
| Iowa State | 7 | 3 | 0 | 7 | 17 |
| • Nebraska | 21 | 0 | 14 | 14 | 49 |

- Date: November 13
- Location: Memorial Stadium, Lincoln, NE
- Game attendance: 75,513

=== Oklahoma ===
Oklahoma at Nebraska [box score]

| Team | 1 | 2 | 3 | 4 | Total |
|---|---|---|---|---|---|
| Oklahoma | 7 | 0 | 0 | 0 | 7 |
| • Nebraska | 0 | 7 | 0 | 14 | 21 |

- Date: November 26
- Location: Memorial Stadium, Lincoln, NE
- Game attendance: 75,674

=== Florida State ===
Florida State vs Nebraska [box score]

| Team | 1 | 2 | 3 | 4 | Total |
|---|---|---|---|---|---|
| • Florida State | 0 | 6 | 9 | 3 | 18 |
| Nebraska | 0 | 7 | 0 | 9 | 16 |

- Date: January 1
- Location: Miami Orange Bowl, Miami, FL
- Game attendance: 81,536
- Referee: John Soffey
- TV announcers (NBC): Dick Enberg, Bob Trumpy and O. J. Simpson

== Personnel ==
=== Roster ===
1993 Nebraska Cornhuskers football team roster
Players
Coaches
Offense

| Pos. | # | Name | Class |
|---|---|---|---|
| TE | 88 | Eric Alford | Jr |
| TE | 80 | Jacques Allen | So |
| TE | 95 | Gerald Armstrong | Sr |
| SE | 7 | Reggie Baul | So |
| TE | 80 | Trumane Bell | Sr |
| IB | 21 | Damon Benning | Fr |
| QB | 18 | Brook Berringer | So |
| OT | 61 | Brady Caskey | Jr |
| IB | 26 | Clinton Childs | So |
| FB | 26 | Troy Barnes | Jr |
| IB | 17 | Davenport Scott | So |
| SE | 83 | Aaron Davis | Fr |
| OT | 75 | Chris Dishman | Fr |
| SE | 2 | Corey Dixon | Sr |
| FB | 37 | Kyle Emsick | Jr |
| FB | 28 | David Fiala | Sr |
| IB | 24 | Jason Fisher | Jr |
| QB | 15 | Tommie Frazier | So |
| G | 64 | Bart Furrow | Sr |
| OT | 59 | Joel Gesky | Jr |
| TE | 87 | Mark Gilman | So |
| C | 63 | Aaron Graham | So |
| FB | 29 | Lance Gray | Sr |
| TE | 89 | Erich Hohl | Jr |
| SE | 47 | Brendan Holbein | Fr |
| C | 51 | Bill Humphrey | Jr |
| WB | 33 | Clester Johnson | So |
| IB | 44 | Calvin Jones | Jr |
| C | | Jeff Katt | So |
| G | | Steve Long | Fr |
| OT | 77 | Lance Lundberg | Sr |
| IB | 19 | Jeff Makovicka | So |
| TE | 91 | Melvin McPhaull | So |
| C | 62 | Ken Mehlin | Sr |
| G | 70 | Wayne Meylan | So |
| OT | 78 | Kory Mikos | Fr |
| WB | 27 | Abdul Muhammad | Jr |
| TE | 92 | Merritt Nelson | So |
| FB | 38 | Chris Norris | So |
| OT | 74 | Brian Nunns | So |
| G | 69 | Steve Ott | So |
| C | 53 | Jon Pedersen | Jr |
| IB | 1 | Lawrence Phillips | Fr |
| WB | 39 | Brett Popplewell | So |
| G | 65 | Bryan Pruitt | So |
| QB | 8 | Ben Rutz | Fr |
| FB | 40 | Cory Schlesinger | Jr |
| IB | 28 | Damon Schmadeke | So |
| FB | 36 | Brian Schuster | Fr |
| TE | 94 | T.J. Scribner | Fr |
| WB | 22 | David Seizys | Sr |
| TE | 85 | Matt Shaw | Jr |
| IB | 47 | Marvin Sims | Fr |
| FB | 42 | Mike Smith | Fr |
| G | 66 | Brenden Stai | Jr |
| FB | 43 | Chad Stanley | So |
| OT | 58 | Adam Treu | Fr |
| QB | 11 | Matt Turman | Fr |
| WB | 31 | Jon Vedral | Fr |
| QB | 9 | Tony Veland | So |
| G | 68 | Steve Volin | So |
| C | 52 | Matt Vrzal | Fr |
| SE | 82 | Riley Washington | Fr |
| OT | 72 | Zach Wiegert | Jr |
| G | 76 | Joel Wilks | Sr |
| G | 56 | Rob Zatechka | Jr |

Defense

| Pos. | # | Name | Class |
|---|---|---|---|
| OLB | 34 | Trev Alberts | Sr |
| CB | 7 | Dave Alderman | Fr |
| LB | 36 | Leonard Alexander | Jr |
| CB | 31 | Marcus Anderson | Sr |
| LB | 48 | Mike Anderson | Sr |
| OLB | | Larry Arnold | So |
| FS | 9 | Dennis Bailey | Fr |
| LB | 23 | Ernie Beler | Sr |
| CB | 11 | Chad Blahak | Fr |
| LB | 54 | Troy Branch | Sr |
| LB | 5 | Lorenzo Brinkley | Sr |
| FS | 19 | Chad Brouse | Fr |
| LB | 47 | Clint Brown | Jr |
| CB | | Willis Brown | Fr |
| FS | 45 | Zeke Cisco | Sr |
| FS | 17 | Sedric Collins | Jr |
| LB | 46 | Doug Colman | So |
| NT | 99 | Terry Connealy | Jr |
| FS | 4 | Troy Dumas | Jr |
| LB | 41 | Phil Ellis | So |
| OLB | 58 | Luther Hardin | So |
| OLB | 86 | Dwayne Harris | Jr |
| OLB | 97 | Paul Hawley | So |
| FS | 25 | Mike Heins | Sr |
| LB | 51 | Jon Hesse | RFr |
| OLB | 38 | Todd Heyne | Sr |
| OLB | 92 | Jerad Higman | Sr |
| DT | 96 | Jason Jenkins | Jr |
| DB | 18 | Jeremy Johnson | So |
| OLB | 84 | Donta Jones | Jr |
| LB | 49 | John Martin | Jr |
| CB | 26 | Keith Mercer | So |
| CB | 14 | Barron Miles | Jr |
| ROV | 10 | Mike Minter | Fr |
| OLB | 90 | Bruce Moore | Sr |
| OLB | 42 | Ed Morrow | Fr |
| CB | 1 | Kareem Moss | Jr |
| NT | 73 | David Noonan | Sr |
| DT | 97 | Jeff Ogard | Fr |
| OLB | 89 | Jeff Olsen | Fr |
| LB | 52 | Aaron Penland | So |
| DT | 57 | Jason Pesterfield | Jr |
| DT | 55 | Christian Peter | So |
| LB | 35 | Jim Prevette | Sr |
| DT | 67 | Kevin Ramaekers | Sr |
| DB | 6 | John Reece | Sr |
| ROV | 39 | Mike Roberts | Fr |
| NT | 74 | Scott Saltsman | Fr |
| CB | 25 | Darren Schmadeke | So |
| LB | 24 | Dean Schneider | Sr |
| LB | | Adam Schultze | So |
| ROV | 33 | Jason Simdorn | Jr |
| LB | 32 | Ed Stewart | Jr |
| CB | 16 | Eric Stokes | Fr |
| LB | 91 | Ryan Terwilliger | Fr |
| DT | | Jared Tomich | So |
| DT | 94 | Larry Townsend | Fr |
| DT | 93 | Billy Wade | Sr |
| LB | 43 | Austin Wertz | Sr |
| ROV | 21 | Matt Westenburg | Jr |
| LB | 98 | Daren Williams | Sr |
| CB | 8 | Tyrone Williams | So |
| FS | 22 | Trampis Wrice | So |
| ROV | 3 | Toby Wright | Sr |
| FS | | Chad Young | So |

Special teams

| Pos. | # | Name | Class |
|---|---|---|---|
| P/PK | 13 | Byron Bennett | Sr |
| PK | 18 | Jeremy Jensen | So |
| PK | 12 | Tom Sieler | Jr |

Head coach

- Tom Osborne
  21st season
  30th year at Nebraska
  Alma mater: Hastings College

Coordinators/assistant coaches

- Charlie McBride
  13th season as DC/DL coach
  17th year at Nebraska
  Alma mater: Colorado
- Turner Gill
  2nd season as QB coach
  2nd year at Nebraska
  Alma mater: Nebraska
- Kevin Steele
  5th season as LB coach
  5th year at Nebraska
  Alma mater: Tennessee
- Ron Brown
  7th season as WR/TE coach
  7th year at Nebraska
  Alma mater: Brown
- Dan Young
  11th season as OL/K coach
  11th year at Nebraska
  Alma mater: Reed
- Milt Tenopir
  20th season as OL coach
  20th year at Nebraska
  Alma mater: Sterling
- Tony Samuel
  8th season as RE coach
  8th year at Nebraska
  Alma mater: Nebraska
- George Darlington
  DB coach
  21st year at Nebraska
  Alma mater: Rutgers
- Frank Solich
  11th season as RB coach
  15th year at Nebraska
  Alma mater: Nebraska
- Boyd Epley
  25th season as S&C coach
  25th year at Nebraska
  Alma mater: Nebraska
- Bill Busch
  4th year at Nebraska

Legend

- (C) Team captain
- (S) Suspended
- (I) Ineligible
- Injured
- Redshirt

Roster
Last update: January 17, 2011

=== Depth chart ===
Defense

FS
Troy Dumas
John Reece
Mike Heins

| WILL | MIKE | SAM |
|---|---|---|
| Ed Stewart | Mike Anderson | Ernie Beler; Lorenzo Brinkley |
| Troy Branch | Darren Williams | Austin Wertz |
| Phill Ellis | Doug Colman | Zeke Cisco |

ROVER
Toby Wright
Mike Minter
Jason Simdorn

CB
Barron Miles
Kareem Moss
Darren Schmadeke

| DE | DT | DT | DE |
|---|---|---|---|
| Donta Jones | Terry Connealy | Kevin Ramaekers | Trev Alberts |
| Bruce Moore | Christian Peter | Billy Wade; David Noonan | Dwayne Harris |
| Jerad Higman | Scott Saltsman | Jason Pesterfield | Luther Hardin |

CB
John Reece
Tyrone Williams
Eric Stokes
⋅

Offense

WR
Abdul Muhammad
Clester Johnson
David Seizys

| LT | LG | C | RG | RT |
|---|---|---|---|---|
| Lance Lundberg | Rob Zatechka | Ken Mehlin | Brenden Stai | Zach Wiegert |
| Chris Dishman | Joel Wilks | Aaron Graham | Steve Ott | Joel Gesky |
| Brady Caskey | Bart Furrow | Jon Pedersen | Bryan Pruitt | Brady Caskey |

TE
Gerald Armstrong
Trumane Bell
Matt Shaw
Eric Alford

WR
Corey Dixon
Reggie Baul
Brett Popplewell

QB
Tommie Frazier
Brook Berringer
Tony Veland

RB
Calvin Jones
Lawrence Phillips
Damon Benning

FB
Corey Schlesinger
Jeff Makovicka
David Fiala

Special teams
PK Byron Bennett
P Byron Bennett

== After the season ==
=== Awards ===
| Award | Name(s) |
|---|---|
| Butkus Award | Trev Alberts |
| All-America 1st team | Trev Alberts |
| All-America 2nd team | Zach Wiegert |
| All-America 3rd team | Calvin Jones |
| Big 8 Coach of the Year | Tom Osborne |
| Big 8 Male Athlete of the Year | Trev Alberts |
| Big 8 Defensive Player of the Year | Trev Alberts |
| Big 8 Defensive Newcomer of the Year | Tyrone Williams |
| All-Big 8 1st team | Trev Alberts, Terry Conneally, Calvin Jones, Lance Lundberg, Ken Mehlin, Barron Miles, Kevin Ramaekers, Zach Wiegert |
| All-Big 8 2nd team | Tommie Frazier, John Reece, Ed Stewart, Toby Wright |
| All-Big 8 honorable mention | Mike Anderson, Gerald Armstrong, Byron Bennett, Corey Dixon, Abdul Muhammad |

=== NFL and pro players ===
The following Nebraska players who participated in the 1993 season later moved on to the next level and joined a professional or semi-pro team as draftees or free agents.

| Name | Team |
|---|---|
| Trev Alberts | Indianapolis Colts |
| Mike Anderson | Amsterdam Admirals |
| Doug Colman | New York Giants |
| Chris Dishman | Arizona Cardinals |
| Corey Dixon | Atlanta Falcons |
| Troy Dumas | Kansas City Chiefs |
| Tommie Frazier | Montreal Alouettes |
| Aaron Graham | Arizona Cardinals |
| Jon Hesse | Green Bay Packers |
| Calvin Jones | Los Angeles Raiders |
| Donta Jones | Pittsburgh Steelers |
| Keithen McCant | Winnipeg Blue Bombers |
| Barron Miles | Pittsburgh Steelers |
| Mike Minter | Carolina Panthers |
| Kareem Moss | BC Lions |
| Christian Peter | New York Jets |
| Lawrence Phillips | St. Louis Rams |
| John Reece | Kansas City Chiefs |
| Cory Schlesinger | Detroit Lions |
| Brenden Stai | Pittsburgh Steelers |
| Ed Stewart | Carolina Panthers |
| Eric Stokes | Seattle Seahawks |
| Jared Tomich | New Orleans Saints |
| Larry Townsend | Berlin Thunder |
| Adam Treu | Oakland Raiders |
| Tony Veland | Denver Broncos |
| Zach Wiegert | St. Louis Rams |
| Tyrone Williams | Green Bay Packers |
| Toby Wright | Los Angeles Rams |
| Rob Zatechka | New York Giants |
