= 1993 Iowa State Cyclones football team =

American college football season

1993 Iowa State Cyclones football
- Conference: Big Eight Conference
- Record: 3–8 (2–5 Big 8)
- Head coach: Jim Walden (7th season)
- Defensive coordinator: Robin Ross (7th season)
- Captain: Kevin Lazard
- Home stadium: Cyclone Stadium

1993 Big Eight Conference football standings
	Conf.					Overall
Team	W		L		T	W		L		T
No. 3 Nebraska $	7	–	0	–	0	11	–	1	–	0
No. 16 Colorado	5	–	1	–	1	8	–	3	–	1
No. 20 Kansas State	4	–	2	–	1	9	–	2	–	1
No. 17 Oklahoma %	4	–	3	–	0	9	–	3	–	0
Kansas	3	–	4	–	0	5	–	7	–	0
Missouri	2	–	5	–	0	3	–	7	–	1
Iowa State	2	–	5	–	0	3	–	8	–	0
Oklahoma State	0	–	7	–	0	3	–	8	–	0
$ – Bowl Coalition representative as champion % – Bowl Coalition at-large representative; Rankings from AP Poll

The 1993 Iowa State Cyclones football team represented Iowa State University as a member of the Big Eight Conference during the 1993 NCAA Division I-A football season. Led by seventh-year head coach Jim Walden, the Cyclones compiled an overall record of 3–8 with a mark of 2–5 in conference play, tying for sixth place in the Big 8. Iowa State played home games at Cyclone Stadium in Ames, Iowa.

== Schedule ==
Date	Time	Opponent	Site	TV	Result	Attendance
September 2	7:00 p.m.	Northern Illinois*	Cyclone Stadium; Ames, IA		W 54–10	35,706
September 11	Noon	Iowa*	Cyclone Stadium; Ames, IA (rivalry)	Cyclone TV Network	L 28–31	53,317
September 18	1:05 p.m.	at No. 24 Wisconsin*	Camp Randall Stadium; Madison, WI		L 7–28	77,745
September 25	4:45 p.m.	at Rice*	Rice Stadium; Houston, TX		L 21–49	18,600
October 2	1:00 p.m.	No. 10 Oklahoma	Cyclone Stadium; Ames, IA	PPV	L 7–24	37,281
October 16	1:00 p.m.	at Kansas	Memorial Stadium; Lawrence, KS		L 20–35	28,500
October 23	1:00 p.m.	Oklahoma State^{†}	Cyclone Stadium; Ames, IA		W 20–17	31,761
October 30	1:00 p.m.	at Missouri	Faurot Field; Columbia, MO (rivalry)		L 34–37	30,294
November 6	1:00 p.m.	No. 18 Kansas State	Cyclone Stadium; Ames, IA (rivalry)		W 27–23	31,441
November 13	1:00 p.m.	at No. 4 Nebraska	Memorial Stadium; Lincoln, NE (rivalry)		L 17–49	75,513
November 20	1:00 p.m.	No. 18 Colorado	Cyclone Stadium; Ames, IA	KCNC	L 16–21	23,797
*Non-conference game; ^{†}Homecoming; Rankings from AP Poll released prior to the game; All times are in Central time

== Roster ==
1993 Iowa State Cyclones football team roster
Players
Coaches
Offense

Pos.	#	Name	Class
OL	73	Tony Booth	Jr
RB	25	Calvin Branch	So
WR	85	James Brooks	Jr
TE	83	Dan Dostal	Jr
QB	4	Todd Doxzon	Fr
QB	14	Robby Duncan	Fr
WR	48	Jeremy Earp	Fr
RB	21	Artis Garris	So
RB	22	Rodney Guggenheim	Fr
WR	9	Lamont Hill	Sr
WR	88	Mike Horacek	So
WR	81	Brandon Hughes	Sr
RB	26	Jim Knott	Jr
OL	60	Mark Konopka	So
RB	1	James McMillion	Sr
WR	86	Ivory Mhoon	Jr
RB	6	Graston Norris	So
OL	62	Doug Skartvedt	So
RB	40	Jeff Soucie	Fr
QB	3	Jeff St. Clair	Fr
OL	52	Jim Thompson	Jr
RB	5	Chris Ulrich	Sr
QB	18	Bob Utter	Jr
RB	38	Hussein Warmack	Sr
OL	69	Brian Wilkinson	Jr

Defense

Pos.	#	Name	Class
LB	49	Marcus Allen	Jr
LB	46	Jeff Cole	Jr
DB	36	Kevin Fulton	Jr
DB	32	Weylan Harding	Jr
DB	33	Kevin Lazard (C)	Sr
LB	42	Marc Lillibridge	Jr
DB	29	Cedric Linwood	Jr
DL	67	Todd Miller	Sr
DL	91	Sheldon Napastuk	Fr
LB	45	Matt Nitchie	Jr
DL	70	Troy Peterson	Jr
LB	50	Tim Sanders	Fr
DL	48	Scott Schulz	Jr
DL	92	Anthony Scott	Jr

Special teams

Pos.	#	Name	Class
P	94	Marc Harris	Fr
P	96	Greg Rogala	Fr
K, P	2	Ty Stewart	Jr

Head coach

- Jim Walden

Coordinators/assistant coaches

Legend

- (C) Team captain
- (S) Suspended
- (I) Ineligible
- Injured
- Redshirt

Roster
Last update: 2023-Jan-02
