= 1993 Baylor Bears football team =

American college football season

1993 Baylor Bears football
- Conference: Southwest Conference
- Record: 5–6 (3–4 SWC)
- Head coach: Chuck Reedy (1st season)
- Offensive coordinator: Jack Crowe (1st season)
- Offensive scheme: I formation
- Defensive coordinator: Pete Fredenburg (10th season)
- Base defense: 4–3
- Home stadium: Floyd Casey Stadium

1993 Southwest Conference football standings
	Conf.					Overall
Team	W		L		T	W		L		T
No. 9 Texas A&M $	7	–	0	–	0	10	–	2	–	0
Texas	5	–	2	–	0	5	–	5	–	1
Texas Tech	5	–	2	–	0	6	–	6	–	0
Rice	3	–	4	–	0	6	–	5	–	0
Baylor	3	–	4	–	0	5	–	6	–	0
TCU	2	–	5	–	0	4	–	7	–	0
SMU	1	–	5	–	1	2	–	7	–	2
Houston	1	–	5	–	1	1	–	9	–	1
$ – Conference champion; Rankings from AP Poll

The 1993 Baylor Bears football team represented Baylor University as a member of the Southwest Conference (SWC) during the 1993 NCAA Division I-A football season. Led by first-year head coach Chuck Reedy, the Bears compiled an overall record of 5–6 with a mark of 3–4 in conference play, tying for fourth place in the SWC. The team played home games at Floyd Casey Stadium in Waco, Texas.

== Schedule ==
Date	Time	Opponent	Rank	Site	TV	Result	Attendance	Source
September 4	7:00 p.m.	No. 25 Fresno State*		Floyd Casey Stadium; Waco, TX		W 42–39	36,690	
September 11	1:00 p.m.	at No. 10 Colorado*	No. 24	Folsom Field; Boulder, CO		L 21–45	50,281	
September 18	8:00 p.m.	at Utah State*		Romney Stadium; Romney, UT		W 28–24	23,095	
September 25	12:00 p.m.	Texas Tech		Floyd Casey Stadium; Waco, TX (rivalry)	Raycom	W 28–26	32,690	
October 2	1:30 p.m.	at Houston		Houston Astrodome; Houston, TX (rivalry)	Raycom	L 3–24	20,123	
October 9	2:00 p.m.	at SMU		Ownby Stadium; University Park, TX		W 31–12	20,216	
October 16	12:00 p.m.	No. 13 Texas A&M		Floyd Casey Stadium; Waco, TX (Battle of the Brazos)	Raycom	L 17–34	43,716	
October 23	1:00 p.m.	TCU^{†}		Floyd Casey Stadium; Waco, TX (rivalry)		L 13–38	33,417	
November 6	12:00 p.m.	at Georgia Tech*		Bobby Dodd Stadium; Atlanta, GA		L 27–37	42,175	
November 13	1:00 p.m.	Rice		Floyd Casey Stadium; Waco, TX		W 38–14	25,397	
November 20	1:00 p.m.	at Texas		Texas Memorial Stadium; Austin, TX (rivalry)	PPV	L 17–38	55,644	
*Non-conference game; ^{†}Homecoming; Rankings from AP Poll released prior to the game; All times are in Central time
