= 1993 Oklahoma State Cowboys football team =

American college football season

1993 Oklahoma State Cowboys football
- Conference: Big Eight Conference
- Record: 3–8 (0–7 Big 8)
- Head coach: Pat Jones (10th season)
- Offensive coordinator: Bill Michael (2nd season)
- Defensive coordinator: Bill Miller (5th season)
- Home stadium: Lewis Field

1993 Big Eight Conference football standings
| | Conf. | | | | | Overall |
| Team | W | | L | | T | W | | L | | T |
|---|---|---|---|---|---|---|---|---|---|---|
| No. 3 Nebraska $ | 7 | – | 0 | – | 0 | 11 | – | 1 | – | 0 |
| No. 16 Colorado | 5 | – | 1 | – | 1 | 8 | – | 3 | – | 1 |
| No. 20 Kansas State | 4 | – | 2 | – | 1 | 9 | – | 2 | – | 1 |
| No. 17 Oklahoma % | 4 | – | 3 | – | 0 | 9 | – | 3 | – | 0 |
| Kansas | 3 | – | 4 | – | 0 | 5 | – | 7 | – | 0 |
| Missouri | 2 | – | 5 | – | 0 | 3 | – | 7 | – | 1 |
| Iowa State | 2 | – | 5 | – | 0 | 3 | – | 8 | – | 0 |
| Oklahoma State | 0 | – | 7 | – | 0 | 3 | – | 8 | – | 0 |
$ – Bowl Coalition representative as champion % – Bowl Coalition at-large representative; Rankings from AP Poll

The 1993 Oklahoma State Cowboys football team represented Oklahoma State University as a member of the Big Eight Conference during the 1993 NCAA Division I-A football season. Led by tenth-year head coach Pat Jones, the Cowboys compiled an overall record of 3–8 with a mark of 0–7 in conference play, placing last out of eight teams in the Big 8. Oklahoma State played home games at Lewis Field in Stillwater, Oklahoma.

== Schedule ==
| Date | Time | Opponent | Site | TV | Result | Attendance | Source |
|---|---|---|---|---|---|---|---|
| September 11 | 6:00 p.m. | Southwest Missouri State* | Lewis Field; Stillwater, OK | | W 45–7 | 40,105 | |
| September 18 | 6:00 p.m. | at Tulsa* | Skelly Stadium; Tulsa, OK (rivalry) | PPV | W 16–10 | 40,385 | |
| September 25 | 9:00 p.m. | at Arizona State* | Sun Devil Stadium; Tempe, AZ | | L 10–12 | 46,344 | |
| October 2 | 2:00 p.m. | TCU* | Lewis Field; Stillwater, OK | | W 27–22 | 40,007 | |
| October 7 | 7:00 p.m. | No. 7 Nebraska | Lewis Field; Stillwater, OK | ESPN | L 13–27 | 35,580 | |
| October 16 | 1:00 p.m. | at Missouri | Faurot Field; Columbia, MO | | L 9–42 | 36,865 | |
| October 23 | 1:00 p.m. | at Iowa State | Cyclone Stadium; Ames, IA | | L 17–20 | 31,761 | |
| October 30 | 2:00 p.m. | Kansas^{†} | Lewis Field; Stillwater, OK | | L 6–13 | 30,613 | |
| November 6 | 2:00 p.m. | No. 23 Colorado | Lewis Field; Stillwater, OK | | L 14–31 | 30,200 | |
| November 13 | 1:00 p.m. | at No. 17 Oklahoma | Oklahoma Memorial Stadium; Norman, OK (Bedlam Series) | | L 0–31 | 65,275 | |
| November 20 | 2:00 p.m. | No. 20 Kansas State | Lewis Field; Stillwater, OK | | L 17–21 | 23,400 | |
*Non-conference game; ^{†}Homecoming; Rankings from AP Poll released prior to the game; All times are in Central time

== Roster ==
1993 Oklahoma State Cowboys football team roster
Players
Coaches
Offense

| Pos. | # | Name | Class |
|---|---|---|---|
| RB | 28 | David Thompson | Fr |

Defense

| Pos. | # | Name | Class |
|---|---|---|---|
| LB | 44 | Keith Burns | Sr |
| DE | 83 | Jason Gildon | Sr |
| DE | 89 | Jevon Langford | Fr |

Special teams

| Pos. | # | Name | Class |
|---|---|---|---|
| P | 10 | Scott Tyner | Sr |

Head coach

- Pat Jones

Coordinators/assistant coaches

Legend

- (C) Team captain
- (S) Suspended
- (I) Ineligible
- Injured
- Redshirt

== After the season ==
The 1994 NFL draft was held on April 24–25, 1994. The following Cowboys were selected.

| Round | Pick | Player | Position | NFL club |
|---|---|---|---|---|
| 3 | 88 | Jason Gildon | Linebacker | Pittsburgh Steelers |
| 7 | 210 | Keith Burns | Linebacker | Denver Broncos |
