= 1993 Kansas State Wildcats football team =

American college football season

1993 Kansas State Wildcats football

Copper Bowl champion

Copper Bowl, W 52–17 vs. Wyoming
- Conference: Big Eight Conference

Ranking
- Coaches: No. 18
- AP: No. 20
- Record: 9–2–1 (4–2–1 Big 8)
- Head coach: Bill Snyder (5th season)
- Offensive coordinator: Del Miller (5th season)
- Offensive scheme: Multiple
- Co-defensive coordinators: Jim Leavitt (3rd season); Bob Stoops (3rd season)
- Base defense: 4–3
- Home stadium: KSU Stadium

1993 Big Eight Conference football standings
| | Conf. | | | | | Overall |
| Team | W | | L | | T | W | | L | | T |
|---|---|---|---|---|---|---|---|---|---|---|
| No. 3 Nebraska $ | 7 | – | 0 | – | 0 | 11 | – | 1 | – | 0 |
| No. 16 Colorado | 5 | – | 1 | – | 1 | 8 | – | 3 | – | 1 |
| No. 20 Kansas State | 4 | – | 2 | – | 1 | 9 | – | 2 | – | 1 |
| No. 17 Oklahoma % | 4 | – | 3 | – | 0 | 9 | – | 3 | – | 0 |
| Kansas | 3 | – | 4 | – | 0 | 5 | – | 7 | – | 0 |
| Missouri | 2 | – | 5 | – | 0 | 3 | – | 7 | – | 1 |
| Iowa State | 2 | – | 5 | – | 0 | 3 | – | 8 | – | 0 |
| Oklahoma State | 0 | – | 7 | – | 0 | 3 | – | 8 | – | 0 |
$ – Bowl Coalition representative as champion % – Bowl Coalition at-large representative; Rankings from AP Poll

The 1993 Kansas State Wildcats football team represented Kansas State University in the 1993 NCAA Division I-A football season. The team's head football coach was Bill Snyder. The Wildcats played their home games in KSU Stadium. 1993 saw the Wildcats finish with a record of 9–2–1, and a 4–2–1 record in Big Eight Conference play.

The 1993 season marked several firsts for the program. The team was ranked in the national polls for the first time since 1970. They also finished the non-conference schedule undefeated for the first time since 1954. The year ended with a dominant victory against Wyoming in the 1993 Copper Bowl. This was the program's first bowl appearance since the 1982 Independence Bowl and first bowl win ever. The 1993 season also marked the first time that Kansas State finished in the final national rankings, and saw the first win over a ranked team in Bill Snyder's career, when No. 25 Kansas State beat No. 13 Oklahoma in Manhattan.

The 1993 season also saw what will likely be the final tie in Kansas State history, as they tied #16 Colorado on October 23. With college football introducing overtime in 1996, a tie is currently impossible under current rules.

1993 was the first year for a new press box on the west side of KSU Stadium. The press box featured suites and cost $3.3 million to build. Also, an indoor practice facility was built.

== Schedule ==
| Date | Time | Opponent | Rank | Site | TV | Result | Attendance |
|---|---|---|---|---|---|---|---|
| September 4 | 1:10 p.m. | New Mexico State* | | KSU Stadium; Manhattan, KS | | W 34–10 | 25,936 |
| September 11 | 1:10 p.m. | Western Kentucky* | | KSU Stadium; Manhattan, KS | | W 38–13 | 29,356 |
| September 18 | 7:00 p.m. | at Minnesota* | | Hubert H. Humphrey Metrodome; Minneapolis, MN | | W 30–25 | 36,245 |
| September 25 | 1:10 p.m. | UNLV* | | KSU Stadium; Manhattan, KS | | W 36–20 | 25,817 |
| October 9 | 1:10 p.m. | Kansas | | KSU Stadium; Manhattan, KS (rivalry) | | W 10–9 | 44,165 |
| October 16 | 1:00 p.m. | at No. 6 Nebraska | | Memorial Stadium; Lincoln, NE (rivalry) | | L 28–45 | 75,721 |
| October 23 | 1:10 p.m. | No. 16 Colorado | | KSU Stadium; Manhattan, KS (rivalry) | | T 16–16 | 33,728 |
| October 30 | 1:10 p.m. | No. 14 Oklahoma^{†} | No. 25 | KSU Stadium; Manhattan, KS | PPV | W 21–7 | 31,569 |
| November 6 | 1:00 p.m. | at Iowa State | No. 18 | Cyclone Stadium; Ames, IA (rivalry) | | L 23–27 | 31,441 |
| November 13 | 1:10 p.m. | Missouri | No. 24 | KSU Stadium; Manhattan, KS | | W 31–21 | 27,168 |
| November 20 | 2:00 p.m. | at Oklahoma State | No. 20 | Lewis Field; Stillwater, OK | | W 21–17 | 23,400 |
| December 29 | 7:00 p.m. | vs. Wyoming* | No. 20 | Arizona Stadium; Tucson, AZ (Copper Bowl) | ESPN | W 52–17 | 49,075 |
*Non-conference game; ^{†}Homecoming; Rankings from AP Poll released prior to the game; All times are in Central time

== Game summaries ==
=== Nebraska ===
Kansas State at Nebraska

| Team | 1 | 2 | 3 | 4 | Total |
|---|---|---|---|---|---|
| Kansas State | 7 | 7 | 7 | 7 | 28 |
| • Nebraska | 14 | 17 | 0 | 14 | 45 |

- Date: October 16
- Location: Memorial Stadium, Lincoln, Nebraska
- Game attendance: 75,721

=== Oklahoma ===
| Team | 1 | 2 | 3 | 4 | Total |
|---|---|---|---|---|---|
| Oklahoma | 0 | 0 | 0 | 7 | 7 |
| • Kansas State | 0 | 7 | 14 | 0 | 21 |

- Date: October 30
- Location: KSU Stadium, Manhattan, Kansas
- Game attendance: 31,569

Scoring summary
| Q2 | KSU | Running 6 yard pass from May (Wright kick) | KSU 7–0 |
| Q3 | KSU | Lockett 22 yard pass from May (Wright kick) | KSU 14–0 |
| Q3 | KSU | May 2 yard run (Wright kick) | KSU 21–0 |
| Q4 | OKLA | Mills 31 yard pass from Gundy (Blanton kick) | KSU 21–7 |

- KSU: Schiller 19 Rush, 111 Yds

== Roster ==
1993 Kansas State Wildcats football team roster
Players
Coaches
Offense

| Pos. | # | Name | Class |
|---|---|---|---|
| WR | 2 | Andre Coleman | Sr |
| OT | 73 | Barrett Brooks | Jr |
| WR | 83 | Kevin Lockett | Fr |
| QB | 5 | Chad May | Jr |
| QB | 12 | Brian Kavanagh | Fr |
| RB | 22 | J.J. Smith | Jr |
| RB | 30 | Rod Schiller | Jr |
| C | 72 | Quentin Neujahr | Sr |

Defense

| Pos. | # | Name | Class |
|---|---|---|---|
| LB | | Mike Ekeler | Jr |
| DE | | Dirk Ochs | So |
| FS | | Jamie Mendez | Sr |
| LB | 9 | Percell Gaskins | Jr |
| LB | 45 | Kirby Hocutt | Jr |
| CB | 4 | Thomas Randolph | Sr |
| LB | 54 | Laird Veatch | Jr |

Special teams

| Pos. | # | Name | Class |
|---|---|---|---|
| K | 18 | Tate Wright | Sr |
| P | | Chad Romano | Fr |

Head coach

- Bill Snyder

Coordinators/assistant coaches

- Del Miller – Offensive Coordinator & assistant head coach
- John Latina – Offensive line & running game coordinator
- Dana Dimel – Offensive line
- Bob Stoops – co-Defensive Coordinator
- Jim Leavitt – co-Defensive Coordinator & linebackers
- Nelson Barnes – Defensive line
- Mike Stoops – Defensive ends
- Ben Griffith – Assistant
- Nick Quartaro – Assistant
- Mark Mangino – Recruiting Coordinator

Legend

- (C) Team captain
- (S) Suspended
- (I) Ineligible
- Injured
- Redshirt
