= 1993 Houston Cougars football team =

American college football season

1993 Houston Cougars football
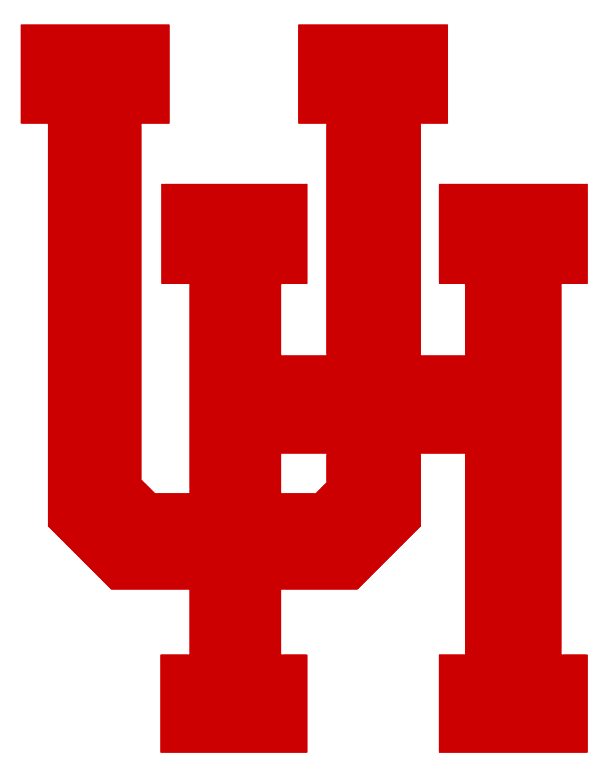
- Conference: Southwest Conference
- Record: 1–9–1 (1–5–1 SWC)
- Head coach: Kim Helton (1st season)
- Offensive coordinator: Neil Callaway (1st season)
- Offensive scheme: Pro-style
- Defensive coordinator: Gene Smith (1st season)
- Base defense: 4–3
- Captains: Ryan McCoy; Jimmy Klingler
- Home stadium: Houston Astrodome

1993 Southwest Conference football standings
	Conf.					Overall
Team	W		L		T	W		L		T
No. 9 Texas A&M $	7	–	0	–	0	10	–	2	–	0
Texas	5	–	2	–	0	5	–	5	–	1
Texas Tech	5	–	2	–	0	6	–	6	–	0
Rice	3	–	4	–	0	6	–	5	–	0
Baylor	3	–	4	–	0	5	–	6	–	0
TCU	2	–	5	–	0	4	–	7	–	0
SMU	1	–	5	–	1	2	–	7	–	2
Houston	1	–	5	–	1	1	–	9	–	1
$ – Conference champion; Rankings from AP Poll

The 1993 Houston Cougars football team represented the University of Houston as a member of the Southwest Conference (SWC) during the 1993 NCAA Division I-A football season. Led by first-year head coach Kim Helton, the Cougars compiled an overall record of 1–9–1 with a mark of 1–5–1 in conference play, tying for seventh place at the bottom of the SWC standings. The team played home games at the Houston Astrodome in Houston.

== Schedule ==
Date	Opponent	Site	TV	Result	Attendance	Source
September 4	at USC*	Los Angeles Memorial Coliseum; Los Angeles, CA	ABC	L 7–49	49,438	
September 11	Tulsa*	Houston Astrodome; Houston, TX		L 24–38	15,138	
September 25	at No. 8 Michigan*	Michigan Stadium; Ann Arbor, MI		L 21–42	104,196	
October 2	Baylor	Houston Astrodome; Houston, TX (rivalry)	Raycom	W 24–3	20,123	
October 9	at No. 14 Texas A&M	Kyle Field; College Station, TX	Raycom	L 10–34	60,575	
October 16	SMU^{†}	Houston Astrodome; Houston, TX (rivalry)		T 28–28	15,973	
October 30	at TCU	Amon G. Carter Stadium; Fort Worth, TX		L 10–28	19,606	
November 4	Texas	Houston Astrodome; Houston, TX	ESPN	L 16–34	26,163	
November 13	Cincinnati*	Houston Astrodome; Houston, TX		L 17–41	10,860	
November 20	vs. Texas Tech	Alamodome; San Antonio, TX (rivalry)		L 7–58	28,652	
November 26	at Rice	Rice Stadium; Houston, TX (rivalry)	ABC	L 7–37	18,100	
*Non-conference game; ^{†}Homecoming; Rankings from AP Poll released prior to the game
