= 1993 TCU Horned Frogs football team =

American college football season

1993 TCU Horned Frogs football
- Conference: Southwest Conference
- Record: 4–7 (2–5 SWC)
- Head coach: Pat Sullivan (2nd season)
- Offensive coordinator: Pete Hoener (2nd season)
- Defensive coordinator: Reggie Herring (2nd season)
- Home stadium: Amon G. Carter Stadium

1993 Southwest Conference football standings
	Conf.					Overall
Team	W		L		T	W		L		T
No. 9 Texas A&M $	7	–	0	–	0	10	–	2	–	0
Texas	5	–	2	–	0	5	–	5	–	1
Texas Tech	5	–	2	–	0	6	–	6	–	0
Rice	3	–	4	–	0	6	–	5	–	0
Baylor	3	–	4	–	0	5	–	6	–	0
TCU	2	–	5	–	0	4	–	7	–	0
SMU	1	–	5	–	1	2	–	7	–	2
Houston	1	–	5	–	1	1	–	9	–	1
$ – Conference champion; Rankings from AP Poll

The 1993 TCU Horned Frogs football team represented Texas Christian University (TCU) in the 1993 NCAA Division I-A football season. The Horned Frogs finished the season 4–7 overall and 2–5 in the Southwest Conference. The team was coached by Pat Sullivan, in his second year as head coach. The Frogs played their home games in Amon G. Carter Stadium, which is located on campus in Fort Worth, Texas.

== Schedule ==
Date	Time	Opponent	Site	TV	Result	Attendance	Source
September 4	7:05 p.m.	No. 21 Oklahoma*	Amon G. Carter Stadium; Fort Worth, TX	PPV	L 3–35	40,418	
September 11		New Mexico*	Amon G. Carter Stadium; Fort Worth, TX		W 35–34		
September 25	7:00 p.m.	SMU	Amon G. Carter Stadium; Fort Worth, TX (rivalry)		L 15–21	26,799	
October 2	2:00 p.m.	at Oklahoma State*	Lewis Field; Stillwater, OK		L 22–27	40,007	
October 9		at Rice	Rice Stadium; Houston, TX		L 19–34		
October 16		Tulane*	Amon G. Carter Stadium; Fort Worth, TX		W 14–7	20,987	
October 23	1:00 p.m.	at Baylor	Floyd Casey Stadium; Waco, TX (rivalry)		W 38–13	33,417	
October 30		Houston	Amon G. Carter Stadium; Fort Worth, TX		W 28–10		
November 6	12:00 p.m.	at Texas Tech	Jones Stadium; Lubbock, TX (rivalry)	Raycom	L 21–49	31,922	
November 13	12:00 p.m.	at Texas	Texas Memorial Stadium; Austin, TX (rivalry)		L 3–24	57,317	
November 20	12:00 p.m.	No. 10 Texas A&M	Amon G. Carter Stadium; Fort Worth, TX (rivalry)	Raycom	L 3–59	33,537	
*Non-conference game; Rankings from AP Poll released prior to the game; All times are in Central time
