= 1993 Rice Owls football team =

American college football season

1993 Rice Owls football
- Conference: Southwest Conference
- Record: 6–5 (3–4 SWC)
- Head coach: Fred Goldsmith (5th season)
- Offensive coordinator: Mike Heimerdinger (5th season)
- Defensive coordinator: Craig Bohl (5th season)
- Home stadium: Rice Stadium

1993 Southwest Conference football standings
	Conf.					Overall
Team	W		L		T	W		L		T
No. 9 Texas A&M $	7	–	0	–	0	10	–	2	–	0
Texas	5	–	2	–	0	5	–	5	–	1
Texas Tech	5	–	2	–	0	6	–	6	–	0
Rice	3	–	4	–	0	6	–	5	–	0
Baylor	3	–	4	–	0	5	–	6	–	0
TCU	2	–	5	–	0	4	–	7	–	0
SMU	1	–	5	–	1	2	–	7	–	2
Houston	1	–	5	–	1	1	–	9	–	1
$ – Conference champion; Rankings from AP Poll

The 1993 Rice Owls football team was an American football team that represented Rice University in the Southwest Conference during the 1993 NCAA Division I-A football season. In their fifth year under head coach Fred Goldsmith, the team compiled a 6–5 record.

== Schedule ==
Date	Opponent	Site	Result	Attendance	Source
September 4	at No. 18 Ohio State*	Ohio Stadium; Columbus, OH	L 7–34	89,040	
September 11	Tulane*	Rice Stadium; Houston, TX	W 34–0	23,400	
September 18	Sam Houston State*	Rice Stadium; Houston, TX	W 14–13	18,600	
September 25	Iowa State*	Rice Stadium; Houston, TX	W 49–21	18,600	
October 2	at Texas	Texas Memorial Stadium; Austin, TX (rivalry)	L 38–55	70,211	
October 9	TCU	Rice Stadium; Houston, TX	W 34–19		
October 16	at Texas Tech	Jones Stadium; Lubbock, TX	L 16–45	27,812	
October 23	No. 11 Texas A&M	Rice Stadium; Houston, TX	L 10–38	46,800	
November 6	at SMU	Ownby Stadium; University Park, TX (rivalry)	W 31–24	14,117	
November 13	Baylor	Floyd Casey Stadium; Waco, TX	L 14–38	25,397	
November 26	Houston	Rice Stadium; Houston, TX (rivalry)	W 37–7	18,100	
*Non-conference game; Rankings from AP Poll released prior to the game
