= 1993 Missouri Tigers football team =

American college football season

1993 Missouri Tigers football
- Conference: Big Eight Conference
- Record: 3–7–1 (2–5 Big 8)
- Head coach: Bob Stull (5th season)
- Offensive coordinator: Dirk Koetter (5th season)
- Defensive coordinator: Skip Hall (1st season)
- Home stadium: Faurot Field

1993 Big Eight Conference football standings
	Conf.					Overall
Team	W		L		T	W		L		T
No. 3 Nebraska $	7	–	0	–	0	11	–	1	–	0
No. 16 Colorado	5	–	1	–	1	8	–	3	–	1
No. 20 Kansas State	4	–	2	–	1	9	–	2	–	1
No. 17 Oklahoma %	4	–	3	–	0	9	–	3	–	0
Kansas	3	–	4	–	0	5	–	7	–	0
Missouri	2	–	5	–	0	3	–	7	–	1
Iowa State	2	–	5	–	0	3	–	8	–	0
Oklahoma State	0	–	7	–	0	3	–	8	–	0
$ – Bowl Coalition representative as champion % – Bowl Coalition at-large representative; Rankings from AP Poll

The 1993 Missouri Tigers football team represented the University of Missouri during the 1993 NCAA Division I-A football season. They played their home games at Faurot Field in Columbia, Missouri. They were members of the Big 8 Conference. The team was coached by fifth–year head coach Bob Stull, who was fired following the conclusion of the season.

== Schedule ==
Date	Time	Opponent	Site	TV	Result	Attendance	Source
September 11	1:00 pm	Illinois*	Faurot Field; Columbia, MO (rivalry)		W 31–3	48,427	
September 18	12:00 pm	at No. 16 Texas A&M*	Kyle Field; College Station, TX	Raycom	L 0–73	51,778	
September 25	12:00 pm	at West Virginia*	Mountaineer Field; Morgantown, WV		L 3–35	53,214	
October 2	1:00 pm	SMU*	Faurot Field; Columbia, MO		T 10–10	39,795	
October 9	1:00 pm	at No. 20 Colorado	Folsom Field; Boulder, CO		L 18–30	52,147	
October 16	1:00 pm	Oklahoma State	Faurot Field; Columbia, MO		W 42–9	36,865	
October 23	1:00 pm	at No. 5 Nebraska	Memorial Stadium; Lincoln, NE (rivalry)		L 7–49	75,574	
October 30	1:00 pm	Iowa State	Faurot Field; Columbia, MO (rivalry)		W 37–34	30,294	
November 6	1:00 pm	No. 20 Oklahoma	Faurot Field; Columbia, MO (rivalry)	PSN	L 23–42	31,438	
November 13	1:10 pm	at No. 24 Kansas State	KSU Stadium; Manhattan, KS		L 21–31	27,168	
November 20	1:00 pm	at Kansas	Memorial Stadium; Lawrence, KS (Border War)		L 0–28	31,500	
*Non-conference game; Rankings from AP Poll released prior to the game; All times are in Central time

== Coaching staff ==
Name	Position	Seasons at Missouri	Alma mater
Bob Stull	Head coach	5	Kansas State (1968)
Dirk Koetter	Offensive coordinator	5	Idaho State (1981)
Mike Ward	Running backs	5	
Larry Hoefer	assistant head coach	5	McMurry (1973)
Andy Moeller	Offensive line & tight ends	1	
Skip Hall	Defensive coordinator	1	
Mo Lattimore	Defensive line	5	
Steve Telander	co-linebackers	5	
Ken Flajole	defensive backs	5	Pacific Lutheran (1977)
Curtis Jones	Assistant	1	
