= Iheanyi Uwaezuoke =

Nigerian gridiron football player (born 1973)

No. 89, 80
- Positions: Wide receiver, return specialist

Personal information
- Born: July 24, 1973 (age 53); Enugu, Nigeria
- Listed height: 6 ft 2 in (1.88 m)
- Listed weight: 198 lb (90 kg)

Career information
- High school: Harvard-Westlake (Los Angeles, California, U.S.)
- College: California
- NFL draft: 1996: 5th round, 160th overall pick

Career history
- San Francisco 49ers (1996–1998); Miami Dolphins (1998); Carolina Panthers (1999)*; Detroit Lions (1999); Oakland Raiders (2000)*; Carolina Panthers (2000)
- * Offseason or practice squad member only

Career NFL statistics
- Receptions: 29
- Receiving yards: 374
- Receiving touchdowns: 1
- Return yards: 848
- Return touchdowns: 1
- Stats at Pro Football Reference

Iheanyi Uwaezuoke (/iːˈhɑːnji uːˈweɪzoʊkeɪ/ ee-HAHN-yee oo-WAY-zoh-kay; // (born 24 July 1973) is a Nigerian former professional American football player. Uwaezuoke played five seasons in the National Football League (NFL), chiefly for the Carolina Panthers and San Francisco 49ers. He finished his career as the league's 27th all-time leader for career yards per punt return. As a collegian, Uwaezuoke played wide receiver for the Golden Bears of the University of California, Berkeley, where he finished 15th in the nation with 5.6 receptions per game as a junior.

== Early life and education ==
Uwaezuoke was born in Enugu, Nigeria. His father, a Nigerian Igbo, came to America in 1978 to pursue his education, and the rest of his family joined him in 1980.

=== High school ===
Uwaezuoke attended Harvard High School in Studio City, California. He played wide receiver, defensive back, linebacker, and punt returner. Uwaezuoke was selected to the Los Angeles Times All San Fernando Valley Team, the All California Southern Section Division VII Team, and the Daily News All Star Roster. Apart from football, he also played basketball (10.2 ppg & All League) and competed in track and field. He placed 3rd at Southern Section Finals in the triple jump covering a distance of 45 feet 2 inches (13.77 m)(school record).

Uwaezuoke was a member of the 400 meter relay which placed 1st at the California Southern Section Division 1A Finals. At 180 pounds (82 kg), Uwaezuoke had a personal best of 45 feet in the shot put. Uwaezuoke was recruited by UCLA, Duke, Penn, and California, but ultimately received no athletic scholarship offers.

=== College ===
Uwaezuoke chose to attend the University of California as a walk-on and earned a scholarship after his first semester. Uwaezuoke became known as a big-play wide receiver for the Golden Bears. He caught 27 passes in his sophomore year, including a touchdown in Cal's 1993 Alamo Bowl win over the Iowa Hawkeyes. Playing in 10 games in 1994, he had 56 catches for 716 yards and 5 touchdowns. In 1995, he missed the front and back ends of his senior year due to thumb and knee injuries and had 30 receptions for 506 yards and three touchdowns in 6 complete games. Uwaezuoke rounded out his college career with 114 catches for 1,703 yards and tied a school record (later surpassed) for total receptions in a game: 13.

=== Statistics at California ===
Yr	Gms	Rec	Rec/Gm	Yds	TD	Yds/Gm	Yds/Rec	Rush	RushYds	APY
RS										
Frosh	4	1	0.25	7	0	1.75	7.0	n/a	n/a	n/a
Soph	12	27	2.07	477	3	40.00	17.7	0	0	477
Jr*	10	56	5.60	716	5	71.60	12.8	n/a	n/a	716
Sr*	6	30	5.00	506	3	84.30	16.9	1	19	531

=== Productivity at California ===
	Soph. Yds/Rec	Jr. Rec/Gm	Sr. Yds/Gm	Soph. Ctch%	Jr. RecTD	Sr. Yds/Rec
Sch ATR	top 20	top 20	top 15	1	top 20	top 20
NatR	top 40	15	top 50	1	top 30	top 30
ConfR	5	4	5	1	9	5

Legend: * missed games due to injury, SCH ATR - school all-time rank, NatR - national rank, ConfR - conference rank, APY - all-purpose yards, Gms - games, Ctch% - catch percentage, Yrds/Rec- yards per reception, RushYds - rushing yards, Rec/TD - receiving touchdowns, RS - redshirt, Frosh - freshman, Soph - sophomore, Jr - junior, Sr - senior.

== Professional career ==
=== San Francisco 49ers ===
==== 1996 ====
Uwaezuoke was considered an NFL top 100 Prospect. He was invited but not medically cleared to participate in the Hula Bowl All Star Classic. He attended the NFL Combine but only participated in interviews and medical examinations. He was projected as a first round draft pick prior to the 1995 NCAA Division 1-A football season. He recorded a 4.38-second forty-yard dash at the 49ers team visit. He was selected by the San Francisco 49ers in round five (pick number 28) of the 1996 NFL draft.

Uwaezuoke signed a three-year $572,000.00 contract with an $81,000.00 signing bonus. He recorded the best "pro agility" or 20-yard shuttle time on a 49ers roster. He was regarded as one of the best athletes in the league as a result of his pro agility and forty yard dash combination. He entered the preseason opener as the 49er offense's primary deep threat and third down receiver. In the same preseason opener vs. the Denver Broncos, he suffered a second degree AC shoulder separation on his first reception and missed six games.

Uwaezuoke returned in week three of the regular season. He was utilized as the 49er offense's primary downfield option and served as team's third receiver. He finished second on the club in yards per catch: 13.0. He led the 49ers in 3rd down conversion percentage: 71% for passes completed. He also led the 49ers in touchdowns per attempt: 14%. He was regarded as a top 40 first year player (out of roughly 1500 total) in the NFL.

==== 1997 ====
Uwaezuoke registered 500+ all purpose yards by week 9 of the regular season. He underwent arthroscopic knee procedure to remove debris (in joint) and missed the week 11 bout vs. the Carolina Panthers. He returned to starting punt return duties in week 12 vs. the San Diego Chargers and posted 60 yards on 5 returns. He added one reception on offense. He was removed from punt return duties after an early second quarter turnover vs. Denver in week 15.

Uwaezuoke returned to the starting line up as punt returner at Seattle for the regular season finale, but was used sparingly. He was not used as a punt returner for the 49ers' two game playoff bid.

He committed three turnovers in 54 attempts (68 touches) for the season. He forced 2 fumbles and recovered another on special teams. He caught two passes in the NFC Championship Game. Uwaezuoke appeared on the NFL leaderboard as a first year featured punt returner: NFL top ten in yards per punt return.

Uwaezuoke finished the regular season as one of nine players on the 49er squad to appear on the NFL single season leaderboard: Dana Stubblefield, Chris Doleman, Gary Anderson, Steve Young, Merton Hanks, Garrison Hearst, Chuck Levy, Terry Kirby. Two of the eight players on the aforementioned list, are currently inducted into the National Football League's Hall of Fame.

Uwaezuoke finished the regular season in the top 6 on the 49ers in all purpose yards: 670, and top 5 for total yards per game: 53. (12.5 games as third receiver, 3 games as kick returner, 12 games as a starting punt returner).

==== 1998 ====
Uwaezuoke was in the NFL top 10 and led the 49ers in total receptions with 13 during the 1998 preseason Uwaezuoke recorded a personal all-time best: 22.3 yards per reception through week 9 of the regular season. He led the 49ers in 1st down conversion percentage through week 9: 100% on passes completed.

=== Miami Dolphins ===
He signed with the Miami Dolphins from waivers in week 11 of 1998. He was deactivated after two games but not placed on Injured Reserve: cyst in left index finger.

After the season, Uwaezuoke underwent successful cyst removal surgery on his left index finger. He was tendered a restricted free agent contract by the Dolphins: 1 year, $420,000. He became an unrestricted free agent in April 1999.

=== Carolina Panthers (first stint) ===
He visited the Atlanta Falcons, Panthers, and Philadelphia Eagles and received three contract offers. He signed a one-year contract as free agent with the Panthers but received no signing bonus. He was released in September 1999 before the start of the regular season.

=== Detroit Lions ===
Uwaezuoke appeared in 10 games with the Detroit Lions. He split time as a punt returner (as game assurance due to previous hand injuries). He led the Lions in punts returned and total punt return yards. He finished the season in the NFL top twenty for yards per punt return. He led the Lions and was in the NFL top 20 in unassisted special teams tackles per game: 10 total; plus 3 assisted Tackles for a total of 13. The Lions earned a wild card playoff bid after a 5 and 11 season in 1998.

=== Carolina Panthers (second stint) ===
Uwaezuoke returned to the Panthers on 4 October 2000 on a one-year contract: $413,000 and no signing bonus. He earned 2 starts at wide receiver. He set a franchise single season record for yards per punt return (still stands). He was the "unofficial" NFL single season leader for yards per punt return: 17.3.

=== NFL statistics ===
Tm	Gms	APY	ATT	PretYds	TTD	Avg/PRet	UTT	STT	FumL	FumR	Ctch%
SF*	36	827	61	374	1	11.0	?		2	2	70
Mia*	2	0	n/a	n/a	n/a	n/a	n/a	n/a	0	0	0
Det	10	155	19	150	0	8.3	10	3	1	0	?
Car	11	219	14	173	1	17.3	n/a	n/a	0	0	?

=== Productivity in the NFL ===
	SF Yds/Pret	Car Yds/Ret	Det UTT	SF Ctch%
TmR	2	1	1	1
ConfR	5	1	top 10	top 10
LgR	10	1**	top 20	top 20**

Legend: * - missed games due to injury which required in season or off season surgery, ** - unofficial stat, Att - attempt, TmR - team rank, ConfR - conference rank, LgR - league rank, SF - San Francisco, Det - Detroit, Car - Carolina, PRet - punt return, STT - assisted special teams tackle, UTT - unassisted special teams tackle, Ctch% - catch percentage, Yds/Ret - yards per punt return, TTD - total touchdowns, FumL - fumbles lost, FumR - fumbles recovered.

=== NFL career summary ===
He finished his pro football career as the NFL's 27th all-time Leader for career yards per punt return. He recorded NFL leaderboard statistics at three uniquely different pro positions over a span of 65 games (includes 1998 preseason). He is one of 13 wide receivers selected in the 1996 draft to earn an all-time top 100 rating at a skill position.
