= 1993 Kansas Jayhawks football team =

American college football season

1993 Kansas Jayhawks football
- Conference: Big Eight Conference
- Record: 5–7 (3–4 Big 8)
- Head coach: Glen Mason (6th season)
- Offensive coordinator: Pat Ruel (6th season)
- Home stadium: Memorial Stadium

1993 Big Eight Conference football standings
	Conf.					Overall
Team	W		L		T	W		L		T
No. 3 Nebraska $	7	–	0	–	0	11	–	1	–	0
No. 16 Colorado	5	–	1	–	1	8	–	3	–	1
No. 20 Kansas State	4	–	2	–	1	9	–	2	–	1
No. 17 Oklahoma %	4	–	3	–	0	9	–	3	–	0
Kansas	3	–	4	–	0	5	–	7	–	0
Missouri	2	–	5	–	0	3	–	7	–	1
Iowa State	2	–	5	–	0	3	–	8	–	0
Oklahoma State	0	–	7	–	0	3	–	8	–	0
$ – Bowl Coalition representative as champion % – Bowl Coalition at-large representative; Rankings from AP Poll

The 1993 Kansas Jayhawks football team represented the University of Kansas as a member of the Big Eight Conference during the 1993 NCAA Division I-A football season. Led by sixth-year head coach Glen Mason, the Jayhawks compiled an overall record of 5–7 with a mark of 3–4 in conference play, placing fifth in the Big 8. The team played home games at Memorial Stadium in Lawrence, Kansas.

== Schedule ==
Date	Time	Opponent	Site	TV	Result	Attendance	Source
August 28	11:00 a.m.	vs. No. 1 Florida State*	Giants Stadium; East Rutherford, NJ (Kickoff Classic)	ABC	L 0–42	51,734	
September 4	1:00 p.m.	Western Carolina*	Memorial Stadium; Lawrence, KS		W 46–3	31,500	
September 11	2:30 p.m.	at Michigan State*	Spartan Stadium; East Lansing, MI	ABC	L 14–31	53,797	
September 18	1:00 p.m.	Utah*	Memorial Stadium; Lawrence, KS		L 16–41	34,000	
October 2	1:00 p.m.	Colorado State*	Memorial Stadium; Lawrence, KS		W 24–6	37,500	
October 9	1:10 p.m.	at Kansas State	KSU Stadium; Manhattan, KS (rivalry)		L 9–10	44,165	
October 16	1:00 p.m.	Iowa State	Memorial Stadium; Lawrence, KS		W 35–20	28,500	
October 23	1:30 p.m.	at No. 17 Oklahoma	Oklahoma Memorial Stadium; Norman, OK		L 23–38	60,441	
October 30	2:00 p.m.	at Oklahoma State	Lewis Field; Stillwater, OK		W 13–6	30,163	
November 6	1:00 p.m.	No. 6 Nebraska	Memorial Stadium; Lawrence, KS (rivalry)		L 20–21	47,500	
November 13	1:00 p.m.	at No. 21 Colorado	Folsom Field; Boulder, CO		L 14–38	52,139	
November 20	1:00 p.m.	Missouri	Memorial Stadium; Lawrence, KS (Border War)		W 28–0	31,500	
*Non-conference game; Rankings from AP Poll released prior to the game; All times are in Central time

== Roster ==
1993 Kansas Jayhawks football team roster
Players
Coaches
Offense

Pos.	#	Name	Class
G	66	Hessley Hempstead	Jr
OT	54	Rod Jones	So
QB	15	Mark Williams	So

Defense

Pos.	#	Name	Class
LB	39	Don Davis	So
DB	8	Kwamie Lassiter	Jr
DB	3	Gerald McBurrows	Jr
DT	72	Chris Maumalanga	Sr

Special teams

Pos.	#	Name	Class

Head coach

- Glen Mason

Coordinators/assistant coaches

Legend

- (C) Team captain
- (S) Suspended
- (I) Ineligible
- Injured
- Redshirt
