= 1993 SMU Mustangs football team =

American college football season

1993 SMU Mustangs football
- Conference: Southwest Conference
- Record: 2–7–2 (1–5–1 SWC)
- Head coach: Tom Rossley (3rd season)
- Offensive coordinator: Mike Wade (3rd season)
- Offensive scheme: Run and shoot
- Defensive coordinator: Jon Tenuta (4th season)
- Base defense: 4–3
- Home stadium: Ownby Stadium; Cotton Bowl

1993 Southwest Conference football standings
	Conf.					Overall
Team	W		L		T	W		L		T
No. 9 Texas A&M $	7	–	0	–	0	10	–	2	–	0
Texas	5	–	2	–	0	5	–	5	–	1
Texas Tech	5	–	2	–	0	6	–	6	–	0
Rice	3	–	4	–	0	6	–	5	–	0
Baylor	3	–	4	–	0	5	–	6	–	0
TCU	2	–	5	–	0	4	–	7	–	0
SMU	1	–	5	–	1	2	–	7	–	2
Houston	1	–	5	–	1	1	–	9	–	1
$ – Conference champion; Rankings from AP Poll

The 1993 SMU Mustangs football team represented Southern Methodist University (SMU) as a member of the Southwest Conference (SWC) during the 1993 NCAA Division I-A football season. Led by third-year head coach Tom Rossley, the Mustangs compiled an overall record of 2–7–2 with a mark of 1–5–1 in conference play, tying for seventh place in the SWC.

== Schedule ==
Date	Time	Opponent	Site	TV	Result	Attendance	Source
September 4	7:00 p.m.	Arkansas*	Cotton Bowl; Dallas, TX		L 6–10	26,163	
September 11	7:00 p.m.	Wisconsin*	Ownby Stadium; University Park, TX		L 16–24	19,013	
September 25	7:00 p.m.	at TCU	Amon G. Carter Stadium; Fort Worth, TX (rivalry)		W 21–15	26,799	
October 2	1:00 p.m.	at Missouri*	Faurot Field; Columbia, MO		T 10–10	39,795	
October 9	2:00 p.m.	Baylor	Ownby Stadium; University Park, TX		L 12–31	20,216	
October 16	2:00 p.m.	at Houston	Houston Astrodome; Houston, TX (rivalry)		T 28–28	15,973	
October 23	12:00 p.m.	vs. Texas	Alamodome; San Antonio, TX	Raycom	L 10–37	42,787	
October 30	2:00 p.m.	at No. 11 Texas A&M	Kyle Field; College Station, TX		L 13–37	53,076	
November 6	2:00 p.m.	Rice	Ownby Stadium; University Park, TX (rivalry)		L 24–31	14,117	
November 13	2:00 p.m.	Texas Tech	Ownby Stadium; University Park, TX		L 24–41	15,714	
November 20	12:30 p.m.	at Navy*	Navy–Marine Corps Memorial Stadium; Annapolis, MD (rivalry)		W 42–13	24,639	
*Non-conference game; Rankings from AP Poll released prior to the game; All times are in Central time

== Roster ==
1993 SMU Mustangs football team roster
Players
Coaches
Offense

Pos.	#	Name	Class
QB	8	Ramon Flanigan	So
WR	22	Mick Rossley	Jr

Defense

Pos.	#	Name	Class
DB	9	Marcus Malonson	Sr

Special teams

Pos.	#	Name	Class

Head coach

- Tom Rossley

Coordinators/assistant coaches

Legend

- (C) Team captain
- (S) Suspended
- (I) Ineligible
- Injured
- Redshirt
