= 1993 Aloha Bowl =

American college football game

Fresno State Bulldogs	Colorado Buffaloes
(8–3)	(8–2–1)
30	41
Head coach: Jim Sweeney	Head coach: Bill McCartney
AP / Coaches / BC; 25 / 24 / 25	AP / Coaches / BC; 17 / 17 / 17
	1	2	3	4	Total
Fresno State	0	10	14	6	30
Colorado	17	3	14	7	41
- Date: December 25, 1993
- Season: 1993
- Stadium: Aloha Stadium
- Location: Honolulu, Hawaii
- Referee: Pat Flood (Pac-10)
- Attendance: 44,009

United States TV coverage
- Network: ABC
- Announcers: Mark Jones, Tim Brant and Jack Arute

The 1993 Aloha Bowl was a post-season college football bowl game played on December 25, 1993. The game matched the Fresno State Bulldogs of the Western Athletic Conference and the Colorado Buffaloes of the Big Eight Conference and featured two eventual Pro Bowl quarterbacks: Fresno State's Trent Dilfer and Colorado's Kordell Stewart. Colorado won, 41–30.

== Scoring summary ==
1st Quarter
CU - Rashaan Salaam 2 run (Mitch Berger kick); 7-0 CU
CU - FG Berger 44; 10-0 CU
CU - James Hill 7 run (Berger kick); 17-0 CU
2nd Quarter
FS - FG Derek Mahoney 27; 17-3 CU
CU - FG Berger 30; 20-3 CU
FS - Malcolm Seabron 68 Fumble Return (Mahoney kick); 20-10 CU
3rd Quarter
CU - Salaam 40 run (Berger kick); 27-10 CU
FS - Anthonny Daigle 1 run (kick blocked); 27-16 CU
CU - Donnell Leomiti 28 fumble return (Berger kick); 34-16 CU
FS - Tydus Winans 8 pass from Trent Dilfer (Daigle pass from Dilfer); 34-24 CU
4th Quarter
CU - Salaam 4 run (Berger kick); 41-24 CU
FS - Winans 11 pass from Dilfer (pass failed); 41-30 CU
