= 1993 Texas Longhorns football team =

American college football season

1993 Texas Longhorns football
- Conference: Southwest Conference
- Record: 5–5–1 (5–2 SWC)
- Head coach: John Mackovic (2nd season)
- Offensive coordinator: Gene Dahlquist (2nd season)
- Defensive coordinator: Leon Fuller (10th season)
- Home stadium: Texas Memorial Stadium

1993 Southwest Conference football standings
	Conf.					Overall
Team	W		L		T	W		L		T
No. 9 Texas A&M $	7	–	0	–	0	10	–	2	–	0
Texas	5	–	2	–	0	5	–	5	–	1
Texas Tech	5	–	2	–	0	6	–	6	–	0
Rice	3	–	4	–	0	6	–	5	–	0
Baylor	3	–	4	–	0	5	–	6	–	0
TCU	2	–	5	–	0	4	–	7	–	0
SMU	1	–	5	–	1	2	–	7	–	2
Houston	1	–	5	–	1	1	–	9	–	1
$ – Conference champion; Rankings from AP Poll

The 1993 Texas Longhorns football team represented the University of Texas at Austin as a member of the Southwest Conference (SWC) during the 1993 NCAA Division I-A football season. Led by second-year head coach John Mackovic, the Longhorns compiled an overall record of 5–5–1 with a mark of 5–2 in conference play, tying for second place in the SWC. The team played home games at Texas Memorial Stadium in Austin, Texas.

== Schedule ==
Date	Time	Opponent	Site	TV	Result	Attendance
September 4	6:30 p.m.	at No. 11 Colorado*	Folsom Field; Boulder, CO	ESPN	L 14–36	52,125
September 18	2:30 p.m.	No. 6 Syracuse*	Texas Memorial Stadium; Austin, TX	ABC	T 21–21	65,897
September 25	3:00 p.m.	at No. 24 Louisville*	Cardinal Stadium; Louisville, KY	PPV	L 10–41	38,492
October 2	7:00 p.m.	Rice	Texas Memorial Stadium; Austin, TX (rivalry)	PPV	W 55–39	70,211
October 9	2:30 p.m.	vs. No. 10 Oklahoma*	Cotton Bowl; Dallas, TX (Red River Shootout)	ABC	L 18–38	75,587
October 23	12:00 p.m.	vs. SMU	Alamodome; San Antonio, TX	Raycom	W 37–10	42,787
October 30	12:00 p.m.	Texas Tech	Texas Memorial Stadium; Austin, TX (rivalry)	Raycom	L 22–31	63,132
November 4	7:00 p.m.	at Houston	Houston Astrodome; Houston, TX	ESPN	W 34–16	26,163
November 13	12:00 p.m.	TCU	Texas Memorial Stadium; Austin, TX (rivalry)	Raycom	W 24–3	57,317
November 20	1:00 p.m.	Baylor	Texas Memorial Stadium; Austin, TX (rivalry)	PPV	W 21–13	55,644
November 25	7:00 p.m.	at No. 8 Texas A&M	Kyle Field; College Station, TX (rivalry)	ESPN	L 9–18	74,748
*Non-conference game; Rankings from AP Poll released prior to the game; All times are in Central time

== Roster ==
1993 Texas Longhorns football team roster
Players
Coaches
Offense

Pos.	#	Name	Class
OT	78	Blake Brockermeyer	So
G	69	Dan Neil	Fr
WR	80	Lovell Pinkney	So

Defense

Pos.	#	Name	Class
CB	2	Taje Allen	Fr
S	8	Van Malone	Sr
LB	63	Chris Rapp	Sr
LB	44	Winfred Tubbs	Sr

Special teams

Pos.	#	Name	Class

Head coach

- John Mackovic

Coordinators/assistant coaches

Legend

- (C) Team captain
- (S) Suspended
- (I) Ineligible
- Injured
- Redshirt
