= 1993 Texas Tech Red Raiders football team =

American college football season

1993 Texas Tech Red Raiders football

John Hancock Bowl, L 10–41 vs. Oklahoma
- Conference: Southwest Conference
- Record: 6–6 (5–2 SWC)
- Head coach: Spike Dykes (7th season)
- Offensive coordinator: Dick Winder (7th season)
- Offensive scheme: No-huddle spread
- Base defense: 4–3
- Home stadium: Jones Stadium

1993 Southwest Conference football standings
| | Conf. | | | | | Overall |
| Team | W | | L | | T | W | | L | | T |
|---|---|---|---|---|---|---|---|---|---|---|
| No. 9 Texas A&M $ | 7 | – | 0 | – | 0 | 10 | – | 2 | – | 0 |
| Texas | 5 | – | 2 | – | 0 | 5 | – | 5 | – | 1 |
| Texas Tech | 5 | – | 2 | – | 0 | 6 | – | 6 | – | 0 |
| Rice | 3 | – | 4 | – | 0 | 6 | – | 5 | – | 0 |
| Baylor | 3 | – | 4 | – | 0 | 5 | – | 6 | – | 0 |
| TCU | 2 | – | 5 | – | 0 | 4 | – | 7 | – | 0 |
| SMU | 1 | – | 5 | – | 1 | 2 | – | 7 | – | 2 |
| Houston | 1 | – | 5 | – | 1 | 1 | – | 9 | – | 1 |
$ – Conference champion; Rankings from AP Poll

The 1993 Texas Tech Red Raiders football team represented the Texas Tech University as a member of the Southwest Conference (SWC) during the 1993 NCAA Division I-A football season. Led by seventh-year head coach Spike Dykes, the Red Raiders compiled an overall record of 6–6 with a mark of 5–2 in conference play, tying for second place in the SWC. Texas Tech was invited to the John Hancock Bowl, where they lost to Oklahoma. The Red Raiders offense scored 419 points while the defense allowed 335 points.

== Schedule ==
| Date | Time | Opponent | Site | TV | Result | Attendance | Source |
|---|---|---|---|---|---|---|---|
| September 4 | 7:00 pm | Pacific (CA)* | Jones Stadium; Lubbock, TX | | W 55–7 | 29,164 | |
| September 11 | 1:00 pm | at No. 9 Nebraska* | Memorial Stadium; Lincoln, NE | | L 27–50 | 75,771 | |
| September 18 | 12:00 pm | at Georgia* | Sanford Stadium; Athens, GA | | L 37–52 | 74,511 | |
| September 25 | 12:00 pm | at Baylor | Floyd Casey Stadium; Waco, TX (rivalry) | Raycom | L 26–28 | 32,690 | |
| October 2 | 11:00 am | No. 14 Texas A&M | Jones Stadium; Lubbock, TX (rivalry) | ABC | L 6–31 | 50,748 | |
| October 9 | 1:00 pm | NC State* | Jones Stadium; Lubbock, TX | | L 34–36 | 26,943 | |
| October 16 | 7:00 pm | Rice^{†} | Jones Stadium; Lubbock, TX | | W 45–16 | 27,812 | |
| October 30 | 12:00 pm | at Texas | Texas Memorial Stadium; Austin, TX (rivalry) | Raycom | W 31–22 | 63,132 | |
| November 6 | 12:00 pm | TCU | Jones Stadium; Lubbock, TX (rivalry) | Raycom | W 49–21 | 31,922 | |
| November 13 | 2:00 pm | at SMU | Ownby Stadium; University Park, TX | | W 41–24 | 15,714 | |
| November 20 | 7:00 pm | vs. Houston | Alamodome; San Antonio, TX (rivalry) | | W 58–7 | 28,652 | |
| December 24 | 1:30 pm | vs. No. 19 Oklahoma* | Sun Bowl Stadium; El Paso, TX (John Hancock Bowl) | CBS | L 10–41 | 43,848 | |
*Non-conference game; ^{†}Homecoming; Rankings from AP Poll released prior to the game; All times are in Central time

== Roster ==
1993 Texas Tech Red Raiders football team roster
Players
Coaches
Offense

| Pos. | # | Name | Class |
|---|---|---|---|
| G | 53 | Peter Allen | Sr |
| TE | 83 | Scott Aylor | Jr |
| C | 50 | Brad Elam | Sr |
| G | 56 | Scott Fitzgerald | Jr |
| QB | 1 | Robert Hall | Sr |
| WR | 18 | Lloyd Hill | Sr |
| WR | 34 | Donald Marshall | Sr |
| WR | 88 | Tony Miller | Sr |
| WR | 11 | Derrell Mitchell | Sr |
| RB | 4 | Bam Morris | Jr |
| OT | 57 | Stacey Petrich | Sr |
| OT | 58 | Ronnie Seals | Sr |
| RB | 40 | Larry Starr | Sr |
| OT | 73 | Jeff Wood | Jr |

Defense

| Pos. | # | Name | Class |
|---|---|---|---|
| DB | 22 | Cat Adams | Jr |
| LB | 37 | Anthony Armour | So |
| LB | 46 | Shawn Banks | So |
| FS | 19 | Dewayne Bryant | Jr |
| DB | 12 | Marcus Coleman | So |
| DT | 77 | Stephen Gaines | Jr |
| DE | 98 | Shawn Jackson | Sr |
| LB | 35 | Zach Thomas | So |
| DE | 13 | Damon Wickware | Jr |
| DE | 94 | Byron Wright | Jr |

Special teams

| Pos. | # | Name | Class |
|---|---|---|---|
| K | 16 | Jon Davis | Jr |
| P | 28 | Robert King | Sr |

Head coach

- Spike Dykes

Coordinators/assistant coaches

Legend

- (C) Team captain
- (S) Suspended
- (I) Ineligible
- Injured
- Redshirt

== Team players drafted into the NFL ==
| Player | Position | Round | Pick | NFL club |
| Bam Morris | Running back | 3 | 91 | Pittsburgh Steelers |
| Lloyd Hill | Wide receiver | 6 | 170 | Chicago Bears |
| Darrell Mitchell | Wide receiver | 6 | 176 | New England Patriots |

== Awards and honors ==
- Bam Morris, Doak Walker Award
