= 1993 Texas A&M Aggies football team =

American college football season

1993 Texas A&M Aggies football

SWC champion

Cotton Bowl Classic, L 21–24 vs. Notre Dame
- Conference: Southwest Conference

Ranking
- Coaches: No. 8
- AP: No. 9
- Record: 10–2 (7–0 SWC)
- Head coach: R. C. Slocum (5th season)
- Offensive coordinator: Bob Toledo (5th season)
- Offensive scheme: West Coast
- Defensive coordinator: Bob Davie (5th season)
- Base defense: 3–4
- Home stadium: Kyle Field

1993 Southwest Conference football standings
	Conf.					Overall
Team	W		L		T	W		L		T
No. 9 Texas A&M $	7	–	0	–	0	10	–	2	–	0
Texas	5	–	2	–	0	5	–	5	–	1
Texas Tech	5	–	2	–	0	6	–	6	–	0
Rice	3	–	4	–	0	6	–	5	–	0
Baylor	3	–	4	–	0	5	–	6	–	0
TCU	2	–	5	–	0	4	–	7	–	0
SMU	1	–	5	–	1	2	–	7	–	2
Houston	1	–	5	–	1	1	–	9	–	1
$ – Conference champion; Rankings from AP Poll

The 1993 Texas A&M Aggies football team represented Texas A&M University as a member of the Southwest Conference (SWC) during the 1993 NCAA Division I-A football season. Led by fifth-year head coach R. C. Slocum, the Aggies compiled an overall record of 10–2 with a mark of 7–0 in conference play, winning the SWC title for the third consecutive season. Texas A&M earned a berth in the Cotton Bowl Classic, where the Aggies lost to Notre Dame. The team was ranked No. 9 in the final AP poll and No. 8 in the final Coaches Poll. Texas A&M played home games at Kyle Field in College Station, Texas.

== Schedule ==
Date	Time	Opponent	Rank	Site	TV	Result	Attendance	Source
September 4	2:30 pm	LSU*	No. 5	Kyle Field; College Station, TX (rivalry)	ABC	W 24–0	61,307	
September 11	2:30 pm	at No. 16 Oklahoma*	No. 5	Oklahoma Memorial Stadium; Norman, OK	ABC	L 14–44	68,211	
September 18	12:00 pm	Missouri*	No. 16	Kyle Field; College Station, TX	Raycom	W 73–0	51,778	
October 2	11:00 am	at Texas Tech	No. 14	Jones Stadium; Lubbock, TX (rivalry)	ABC	W 31–6	50,748	
October 9	2:00 pm	Houston	No. 14	Kyle Field; College Station, TX		W 34–10	60,575	
October 16	12:00 pm	at Baylor	No. 13	Floyd Casey Stadium; Waco, TX (Battle of the Brazos)	Raycom	W 34–17	43,716	
October 23	2:00 pm	at Rice	No. 11	Rice Stadium; Houston, TX		W 38–10	46,800	
October 30	2:00 pm	SMU	No. 11	Kyle Field; College Station, TX		W 37–13	53,076	
November 13	6:30 pm	No. 20 Louisville*	No. 11	Kyle Field; College Station, TX	ESPN	W 42–7	56,161	
November 20	12:00 pm	at TCU	No. 10	Amon G. Carter Stadium; Fort Worth, TX (rivalry)	Raycom	W 59–3	33,537	
November 25	6:30 pm	Texas	No. 8	Kyle Field; College Station, TX (rivalry)	ESPN	W 18–9	74,748	
January 1	1:30 pm	vs. No. 4 Notre Dame*	No. 7	Cotton Bowl; Dallas, TX (Cotton Bowl Classic)	NBC	L 21–24	69,855	
*Non-conference game; Rankings from AP Poll released prior to the game; All times are in Central time

== Game summaries ==
=== LSU ===
	1	2	3	4	Total
LSU	0	0	0	0	0
#5 Texas A&M	0	0	14	10	24

=== Oklahoma ===
	1	2	3	4	Total
#5 Texas A&M	0	0	7	7	14
#16 Oklahoma	3	10	7	24	44

=== Missouri ===
	1	2	3	4	Total
Missouri	0	0	0	0	0
#16 Texas A&M	14	14	38	7	73

=== Texas Tech ===
	1	2	3	4	Total
#14 Texas A&M					0
Texas Tech					0

=== Houston ===
	1	2	3	4	Total
Houston					0
#14 Texas A&M					0

=== Baylor ===
	1	2	3	4	Total
#13 Texas A&M					0
Baylor					0

=== Rice ===
	1	2	3	4	Total
#11 Texas A&M					0
Rice					0

=== SMU ===
	1	2	3	4	Total
SMU					0
#11 Texas A&M					0

=== Louisville ===
	1	2	3	4	Total
#20 Louisville	0	7	0	0	7
#11 Texas A&M	14	7	7	14	42

=== TCU ===
	1	2	3	4	Total
#10 Texas A&M					0
TCU					0

=== Texas ===
	1	2	3	4	Total
Texas	3	6	0	0	9
#8 Texas A&M	0	15	0	3	18

=== Notre Dame ===
	1	2	3	4	Total
#4 Notre Dame	7	0	14	3	24
#7 Texas A&M	7	7	7	0	21

== Roster ==
- QB Corey Pullig

• 12th Man Kurtis Koop
