= Aubrey Beavers =

American football player (born 1971)

No. 53, 58
- Position: Linebacker

Personal information
- Born: August 30, 1971 (age 55); Houston, Texas, U.S.
- Listed height: 6 ft 3 in (1.91 m)
- Listed weight: 231 lb (105 kg)

Career information
- High school: Yates (Houston, Texas)
- College: Oklahoma
- NFL draft: 1994: 2nd round, 54th overall pick

Career history
- Miami Dolphins (1994–1995); Green Bay Packers (1996)*; New York Jets (1996); Rhein Fire (1997)
- * Offseason or practice squad member only

Awards and highlights
- PFWA All-Rookie Team (1994); Third-team All-American (1993); First-team All-Big Eight (1993); Second-team All-Big Eight (1992)

Career NFL statistics
- Interceptions: 2
- INT yards: 8
- Tackles: 60
- Stats at Pro Football Reference

Aubrey Beavers (born August 30, 1971) is an American former professional football player who was a linebacker in the National Football League (NFL). He was selected by the Miami Dolphins in the second round of the 1994 NFL draft. He played two seasons for the Dolphins and one for the New York Jets. He played college football for the Oklahoma Sooners.

== Professional football statistics ==
Year	Team	GP	TOT	SOLO	AST	SACK	FF	FR	YDS (FUM)	INT	YDS (INT)	AVG	LNG	TD	PD	STF	STFYDS	KB
1994	MIA	16	49	36	13	0.0	0	0	0	2	0	0	0	0	4	0	0	0
1995	MIA	16	12	7	5	0.0	0	0	0	1	8	8	8	0	1	0	0	0
1996	NYJ	7	6	1	5	0.0	0	0	0	0	0	0	0	0	0	0	0	0
Career		39	67	44	23	0.0	0	0	0	3	8	3	8	0	5	0	0	0
