= 1993 John Hancock Bowl =

American college football game

- 60th Sun Bowl
Oklahoma Sooners	Texas Tech Red Raiders
(8–3)	(6–5)
Big Eight	SWC
41	10
Head coach: Gary Gibbs	Head coach: Spike Dykes
AP / Coaches / BC; 19 / 16 / 19
	1	2	3	4	Total
Oklahoma	14	14	0	13	41
Texas Tech	0	3	7	0	10
- Date: December 24, 1993
- Season: 1993
- Stadium: Sun Bowl
- Location: El Paso, Texas
- MVP: QB Cale Gundy (Oklahoma)
- Referee: Aster Sizemore (SEC)
- Attendance: 43,848

United States TV coverage
- Network: CBS
- Announcers: Dick Stockton; Randy Cross; Pat O'Brien

The 1993 John Hancock Bowl was a college football postseason bowl game that featured the Texas Tech Red Raiders and the Oklahoma Sooners.

After holding sponsorship rights to the game since 1986, and also naming beginning in 1989, John Hancock Insurance’s licensing agreement ended following this game. The bowl reverted to its previous name, the Sun Bowl, for the next season.

== Background ==
The Red Raiders finished tied for 2nd in the Southwest Conference for the third straight year after going from a 1-5 start to winning five straight games to close out the regular season, in their first bowl appearance since 1989 and first sun Bowl since 1972. Oklahoma finished 4th in the Big Eight Conference after a 5-0 start derailed into a 3-3 finish, with their three losses being to ranked teams (#20 Colorado, #25 Kansas State & #2 Nebraska, respectively). This was Oklahoma's first Sun Bowl since 1981.

== Game summary ==
Dwayne Chandler scored on a two-yard touchdown to give Oklahoma a quick lead less than two minutes into the game that culminated a 37-yard drive in 47 seconds. Rickey Brady made it 14-0 on Oklahoma's next possession (7 plays for 69 yards) to with 3:30 in the quarter. Tech responded with a field goal by Jon Davis from 22 yards out with 5:24 in the half. But Oklahoma took advantage of the time left in the half to score twice. Corey Warren caught a pass from 34 yards out by Cale Gundy to make it 21-3 with 1:45 to go, and Brady scored on a touchdown pass from 15 yards out to make it 28-3 with :05 left in the half. The third quarter had just one score, by Tech's Bam Morris on a 2-yard touchdown run less than 4 minutes into the second half that made it 28-10. In the fourth quarter, the Sooners shut the Raiders out, scoring twice in the quarter. Jerald Moore made it 35-10 on a 32-yard touchdown run and then scored again as time ran out to make the final score 41-10. Gundy went 15-of-26 for 215 yards and 3 touchdowns and 1 interception in an MVP effort. Moore rushed for 85 yards on 15 carries. In a losing effort, Morris went for 95 yards on 27 carries.

== Aftermath ==
Oklahoma and Texas Tech were joined into the same conference after the demise of the SWC in 1996. The Sooners returned to the Sun Bowl in 2009. Texas Tech has not returned to the Sun Bowl since this game.

== Statistics ==
Statistics	Oklahoma	Texas Tech
First downs	21	18
Yards rushing	177	116
Yards passing	215	199
Total yards	392	315
Punts-Average	7-48.3	7-42.6
Fumbles-Lost	4-2	0-0
Passes Intercepted	4	1
Penalties-Yards	9-65	6-65
Possession Time	35:22	24:38
