= 2020 Murray State Racers football team =

American college football season

2020 Murray State Racers football
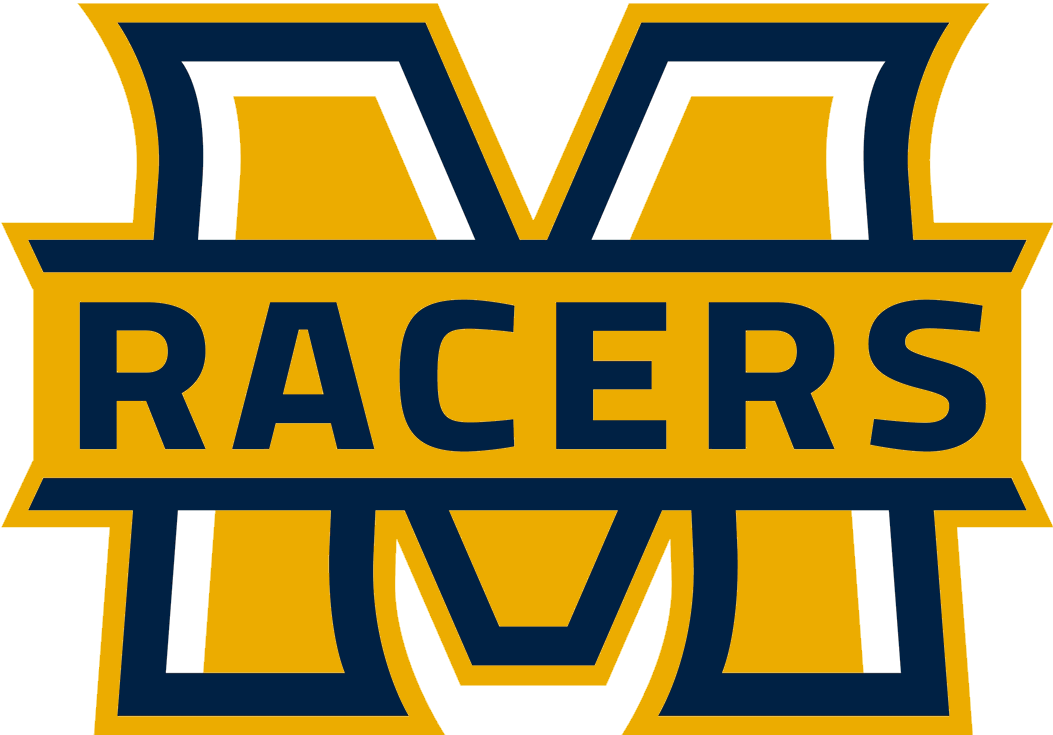
- Conference: Ohio Valley Conference

Ranking
- STATS: No. 19
- FCS Coaches: No. 18
- Record: 5–2 (5–2 OVC)
- Head coach: Dean Hood (1st season)
- Offensive coordinator: Ben Hodges (1st season)
- Defensive coordinator: Dillon Sanders (1st season)
- Home stadium: Roy Stewart Stadium

2020 Ohio Valley Conference football standings
	Conf.			Overall
Team	W		L	W		L
No. 8 Jacksonville State $^	6	–	1	10	–	3
No. 19 Murray State	5	–	2	5	–	2
No. 21 Austin Peay	4	–	2	4	–	5
Southeast Missouri State	4	–	3	4	–	4
UT Martin	3	–	4	3	–	4
Tennessee Tech	2	–	5	2	–	5
Tennessee State	2	–	5	2	–	5
Eastern Illinois	1	–	5	1	–	5
$ – Conference champion; ^ – FCS playoff participant; Note: Eastern Kentucky played only in the fall and opted out of the spring season.; Rankings from STATS Poll

The 2020 Murray State Racers football team represented Murray State University in the 2020–21 NCAA Division I FCS football season. They were led by Dean Hood in his first season as the program's 19th head coach. The Racers played their home games at Roy Stewart Stadium. They competed as a member of the Ohio Valley Conference.

== Schedule ==
Murray State had games scheduled against Louisville and Tarleton State, which were canceled due to the COVID-19 pandemic.

Date	Time	Opponent	Rank	Site	TV	Result	Attendance
February 28	2:00 p.m.	UT Martin		Roy Stewart Stadium; Murray, KY	ESPN+	W 14–10	2,528
March 7	2:00 p.m.	at No. 16 Southeast Missouri State		Houck Stadium; Cape Girardeau, MO	ESPN+	W 24–21	2,638
March 14	1:00 p.m.	at Tennessee Tech		Tucker Stadium; Cookeville, TN	ESPN+	W 36–31	1,511
March 21	2:00 p.m.	Tennessee State	No. 25	Roy Stewart Stadium; Murray, KY	ESPN+	W 35–13	2,545
March 28	2:00 p.m.	Eastern Illinois	No. 19	Roy Stewart Stadium; Murray, KY	ESPN+	W 41–27	2,628
April 3	2:00 p.m.	at Austin Peay	No. 14	Fortera Stadium; Clarksville, TN	ESPN+	L 31–34	1,843
April 11	2:00 p.m.	No. 10 Jacksonville State	No. 17	Roy Stewart Stadium; Murray, KY	ESPN+	L 14–28	3,211
Rankings from STATS Poll released prior to the game; All times are in Central time
