= 2017 Tennessee Tech Golden Eagles football team =

American college football season

2017 Tennessee Tech Golden Eagles football
- Conference: Ohio Valley Conference
- Record: 1–10 (1–7 OVC)
- Head coach: Marcus Satterfield (2nd season)
- Offensive coordinator: Tyree Foreman (1st season)
- Offensive scheme: Pro-style
- Defensive coordinator: Shawn Quinn (2nd season)
- Base defense: 4–3
- Home stadium: Tucker Stadium

2017 Ohio Valley Conference football standings
	Conf.			Overall
Team	W		L	W		L
No. 9 Jacksonville State $^	8	–	0	10	–	2
Austin Peay	7	–	1	8	–	4
Eastern Illinois	5	–	3	6	–	5
UT Martin	4	–	4	6	–	5
Eastern Kentucky	3	–	5	4	–	7
Southeast Missouri State	3	–	5	3	–	8
Tennessee State	2	–	5	6	–	5
Murray State	2	–	5	3	–	8
Tennessee Tech	1	–	7	1	–	10
$ – Conference champion; ^ – FCS playoff participant; Rankings from STATS Poll

The 2017 Tennessee Tech Golden Eagles football team represented Tennessee Technological University as a member of Ohio Valley Conference (OVC) during the 2017 NCAA Division I FCS football season. Led by Marcus Satterfield in his second and final season as head coach, the Golden Eagles compiled an overall record of 1–10 overall with a mark of 1–7 in conference play, placing last out of nine teams in the OVC. Tennessee Tech played home games at Tucker Stadium in Cookeville, Tennessee.

On November 19, Satterfield was fired. He finished his tenure at Tennessee Tech with a two-year record of 6–16.

== Schedule ==
Date	Time	Opponent	Site	TV	Result	Attendance
August 31	6:00 p.m.	No. 25 Western Illinois*	Tucker Stadium; Cookeville, TN	OVCDN	L 14–41	7,886
September 9	6:00 p.m.	at Kennesaw State*	Fifth Third Bank Stadium; Kennesaw, GA	BSN	L 14–27	8,418
September 16	2:00 p.m.	at Ball State*	Scheumann Stadium; Muncie, IN	ESPN3	L 13–28	14,265
September 23	5:00 p.m.	at Eastern Kentucky	Roy Kidd Stadium; Richmond, KY	OVCDN	L 21–24	9,520
September 30	6:00 p.m.	No. 5 Jacksonville State	Tucker Stadium; Cookeville, TN	OVCDN	L 7–34	8,327
October 7	6:00 p.m.	at Eastern Illinois	O'Brien Field; Charleston, IL	OVCDN	L 23–24	3,016
October 14	1:00 p.m.	at Southeast Missouri State	Houck Stadium; Cape Girardeau, MO	OVCDN	L 3–31	4,615
October 28	1:30 p.m.	Tennessee State	Tucker Stadium; Cookeville, TN (Sgt. York Trophy)	OVCDN	W 30–26	5,235
November 4	1:30 p.m.	Austin Peay^{†}	Tucker Stadium; Cookeville, TN (Sgt. York Trophy)	ESPN3	L 28–35	9,416
November 11	1:00 p.m.	at Murray State	Roy Stewart Stadium; Murray, KY	OVCDN	L 21–31	2,427
November 18	1:30 p.m.	UT Martin	Tucker Stadium; Cookeville, TN (Sgt. York Trophy)	OVCDN	L 0–24	2,159
*Non-conference game; ^{†}Homecoming; Rankings from STATS Poll released prior to the game; All times are in Central time

== Game summaries ==
=== Western Illinois ===
	1	2	3	4	Total
No. 25 Leathernecks	3	7	24	7	41
Golden Eagles	0	0	0	14	14

=== At Kennesaw State ===
	1	2	3	4	Total
Golden Eagles	0	0	0	14	14
Owls	10	14	3	0	27

=== At Ball State ===
	1	2	3	4	Total
Golden Eagles	0	7	6	0	13
Cardinals	7	14	7	0	28

=== At Eastern Kentucky ===
	1	2	3	4	Total
Golden Eagles	0	0	7	14	21
Colonels	10	0	7	7	24

=== Jacksonville State ===
	1	2	3	4	Total
No. 5 Gamecocks	7	7	6	14	34
Golden Eagles	0	0	7	0	7

=== At Eastern Illinois ===
	1	2	3	4	Total
Golden Eagles	14	0	6	3	23
Panthers	0	3	14	7	24

=== At Southeast Missouri State ===
	1	2	3	4	Total
Golden Eagles	0	3	0	0	3
Redhawks	17	0	0	14	31

=== Tennessee State ===
	1	2	3	4	Total
Tigers	7	10	7	2	26
Golden Eagles	13	7	7	3	30

=== Austin Peay ===
	1	2	3	4	Total
Governors	7	7	14	7	35
Golden Eagles	7	0	7	14	28

=== At Murray State ===
	1	2	3	4	Total
Golden Eagles	7	0	7	7	21
Racers	3	14	14	0	31

=== UT Martin ===
	1	2	3	4	Total
Skyhawks	7	3	0	14	24
Golden Eagles	0	0	0	0	0
