= 2017 Murray State Racers football team =

American college football season

2017 Murray State Racers football
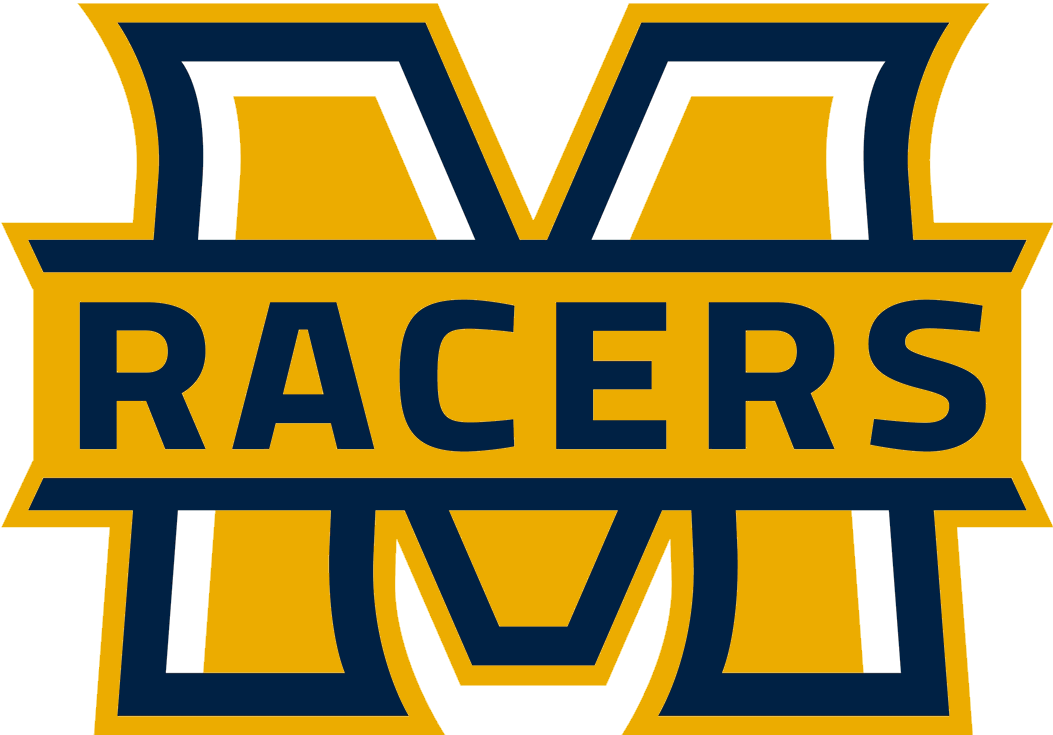
- Conference: Ohio Valley Conference
- Record: 3–8 (2–5 OVC)
- Head coach: Mitch Stewart (3rd season)
- Co-offensive coordinators: Casey Brockman (4th season); Brian Hamilton (1st season)
- Defensive coordinator: Chris Boone (3rd season)
- Home stadium: Roy Stewart Stadium

2017 Ohio Valley Conference football standings
	Conf.			Overall
Team	W		L	W		L
No. 9 Jacksonville State $^	8	–	0	10	–	2
Austin Peay	7	–	1	8	–	4
Eastern Illinois	5	–	3	6	–	5
UT Martin	4	–	4	6	–	5
Eastern Kentucky	3	–	5	4	–	7
Southeast Missouri State	3	–	5	3	–	8
Tennessee State	2	–	5	6	–	5
Murray State	2	–	5	3	–	8
Tennessee Tech	1	–	7	1	–	10
$ – Conference champion; ^ – FCS playoff participant; Rankings from STATS Poll

The 2017 Murray State Racers football team represented Murray State University in the 2017 NCAA Division I FCS football season. They were led by third-year head coach Mitch Stewart and played their home games at Roy Stewart Stadium. They were members of the Ohio Valley Conference. They finished the season 3–8, 2–5 in OVC play to finish in a tie for seventh place.

== Schedule ==
Date	Time	Opponent	Site	TV	Result	Attendance
August 31	6:00 p.m.	Kentucky Wesleyan*	Roy Stewart Stadium; Murray, KY	OVCDN	W 67–7	2,693
September 9	6:00 p.m.	No. 15 Central Arkansas*	Roy Stewart Stadium; Murray, KY	OVCDN	L 13–41	7,456
September 16	2:00 p.m.	at Missouri State*	Plaster Sports Complex; Springfield, MO	ESPN3	L 21–28	13,648
September 23	6:00 p.m.	Austin Peay	Roy Stewart Stadium; Murray, KY (Battle of the Border)	OVCDN	L 7–27	9,191
September 30	3:30 p.m.	at No. 17 (FBS) Louisville*	Papa John's Cardinal Stadium; Louisville, KY	ACCRSN	L 10–55	47,826
October 7	2:00 p.m.	at No. 25 UT Martin	Graham Stadium; Martin, TN	OVCDN	W 13–10	4,618
October 14	3:00 p.m.	Eastern Illinois	Roy Stewart Stadium; Murray, KY	OVCDN	L 24–27 ^{2OT}	3,263
October 28	3:00 p.m.	Eastern Kentucky^{†}	Roy Stewart Stadium; Murray, KY	OVCDN	L 13–26	5,209
November 4	1:00 p.m.	at No. 3 Jacksonville State	JSU Stadium; Jacksonville, AL	OVCDN	L 23–59	16,453
November 11	1:00 p.m.	Tennessee Tech	Roy Stewart Stadium; Murray, KY	OVCDN	W 31–21	2,427
November 18	1:00 p.m.	at Southeast Missouri State	Houck Stadium; Cape Girardeau, MO	OVCDN	L 10–21	1,120
*Non-conference game; ^{†}Homecoming; Rankings from STATS Poll released prior to the game; All times are in Central time

- Source: Schedule
