= 2017 Eastern Kentucky Colonels football team =

American college football season

2017 Eastern Kentucky Colonels football
- Conference: Ohio Valley Conference
- Record: 4–7 (3–5 OVC)
- Head coach: Mark Elder (2nd season)
- Offensive coordinator: Kurt Mattix (2nd season)
- Defensive coordinator: Angelo Mirando (2nd season)
- Home stadium: Roy Kidd Stadium

2017 Ohio Valley Conference football standings
	Conf.			Overall
Team	W		L	W		L
No. 9 Jacksonville State $^	8	–	0	10	–	2
Austin Peay	7	–	1	8	–	4
Eastern Illinois	5	–	3	6	–	5
UT Martin	4	–	4	6	–	5
Eastern Kentucky	3	–	5	4	–	7
Southeast Missouri State	3	–	5	3	–	8
Tennessee State	2	–	5	6	–	5
Murray State	2	–	5	3	–	8
Tennessee Tech	1	–	7	1	–	10
$ – Conference champion; ^ – FCS playoff participant; Rankings from STATS Poll

The 2017 Eastern Kentucky Colonels football team represented Eastern Kentucky University during the 2017 NCAA Division I FCS football season. They were led by second-year head coach Mark Elder and played their home games at Roy Kidd Stadium. They were a member of the Ohio Valley Conference. They finished the season 4–7, 3–5 in OVC play to finish in a tie for fifth place.

== Schedule ==
Date	Time	Opponent	Site	TV	Result	Attendance
September 2	7:00 p.m.	at Western Kentucky*	Houchens Industries–L. T. Smith Stadium; Bowling Green, KY (Battle of the Bluegrass)	FloSports	L 17–31	18,614
September 9	12:00 p.m.	at Kentucky*	Kroger Field; Lexington, KY	SECN	L 16–27	54,868
September 23	6:00 p.m.	Tennessee Tech	Roy Kidd Stadium; Richmond, KY	OVCDN	W 24–21	9,520
September 30	7:00 p.m.	at Southeast Missouri State	Houck Stadium; Cape Girardeau, MO	OVCDN	L 10–29	4,375
October 7	6:00 p.m.	Tennessee State	Roy Kidd Stadium; Richmond, KY	OVCDN	L 21–45	8,410
October 14	4:00 p.m.	at No. 3 Jacksonville State	JSU Stadium; Jacksonville, AL	ESPN3	L 25–41	18,045
October 21	3:00 p.m.	UT Martin^{†}	Roy Kidd Stadium; Richmond, KY	OVCDN	W 31–21	9,420
October 28	4:00 p.m.	at Murray State	Roy Stewart Stadium; Murray, KY	OVCDN	W 26–13	5,209
November 4	2:00 p.m.	at Eastern Illinois	O'Brien Stadium; Charleston, IL	OVCDN	L 20–23 ^{OT}	2,828
November 11	1:00 p.m.	Austin Peay	Roy Kidd Stadium; Richmond, KY	OVCDN	L 24–31	5,100
November 18	1:00 p.m.	Saint Francis (PA)*	Roy Kidd Stadium; Richmond, KY	OVCDN	W 14–10	3,720
*Non-conference game; ^{†}Homecoming; Rankings from STATS Poll released prior to the game; All times are in Eastern time
