= 2017 Eastern Illinois Panthers football team =

American college football season

2017 Eastern Illinois Panthers football
- Conference: Ohio Valley Conference
- Record: 6–5 (5–3 OVC)
- Head coach: Kim Dameron (4th season)
- Offensive coordinator: Greg Stevens (4th season)
- Defensive coordinator: Cary Fowler (1st season)
- Home stadium: O'Brien Field

2017 Ohio Valley Conference football standings
	Conf.			Overall
Team	W		L	W		L
No. 9 Jacksonville State $^	8	–	0	10	–	2
Austin Peay	7	–	1	8	–	4
Eastern Illinois	5	–	3	6	–	5
UT Martin	4	–	4	6	–	5
Eastern Kentucky	3	–	5	4	–	7
Southeast Missouri State	3	–	5	3	–	8
Tennessee State	2	–	5	6	–	5
Murray State	2	–	5	3	–	8
Tennessee Tech	1	–	7	1	–	10
$ – Conference champion; ^ – FCS playoff participant; Rankings from STATS Poll

The 2017 Eastern Illinois Panthers football team represented Eastern Illinois University as a member of the Ohio Valley Conference (OVC) during the 2017 NCAA Division I FCS football season. Led by fourth-year head coach Kim Dameron, the Panthers compiled an overall record of 6–5 overall with a mark of 5–3 in conference play, placing third in the OVC. Eastern Illinois played home games at O'Brien Field in Charleston, Illinois.

== Schedule ==
Date	Time	Opponent	Site	TV	Result	Attendance
August 31	6:00 p.m.	at Indiana State*	Memorial Stadium; Terre Haute, IN	ESPN3	W 22–20	4,670
September 9	2:30 p.m.	at Northern Illinois*	Huskie Stadium; DeKalb, IL	ESPN3	L 10–38	16,722
September 16	2:00 p.m.	No. 18 Illinois State*	O'Brien Field; Charleston, IL (Mid-America Classic)	OVCDN	L 13–44	7,031
September 23	6:00 p.m.	Southeast Missouri State	O'Brien Field; Charleston, IL	OVCDN	W 19–16	3,699
September 30	6:00 p.m.	at No. 24 Tennessee State	Nissan Stadium; Nashville, TN (John Merritt Classic)	ESPN3	W 19–16 ^{2OT}	11,013
October 7	6:00 p.m.	Tennessee Tech	O'Brien Field; Charleston, IL	OVCDN	W 24–23	3,016
October 14	3:00 p.m.	at Murray State	Roy Stewart Stadium; Murray, KY	OVCDN	W 27–24 ^{2OT}	3,263
October 21	2:00 p.m.	No. 3 Jacksonville State^{†}	O'Brien Field; Charleston, IL	ESPN3	L 14–30	8,176
October 28	2:00 p.m.	at UT Martin	Graham Stadium; Martin, TN	OVCDN	L 10–27	1,682
November 4	1:00 p.m.	Eastern Kentucky	O'Brien Field; Charleston, IL	OVCDN	W 23–20 ^{OT}	2,828
November 18	5:00 p.m.	at Austin Peay	Fortera Stadium; Clarksville, TN	OVCDN	L 13–28	8,214
*Non-conference game; ^{†}Homecoming; Rankings from STATS Poll released prior to the game; All times are in Central time

== Game summaries ==
=== At Indiana State ===
	1	2	3	4	Total
Panthers	13	3	0	6	22
Sycamores	7	0	3	10	20

=== At Northern Illinois ===
	1	2	3	4	Total
Panthers	3	0	0	7	10
Huskies	7	24	7	0	38

=== Illinois State ===
	1	2	3	4	Total
No. 18 Redbirds	10	17	10	7	44
Panthers	0	6	7	0	13

=== Southeast Missouri State ===
	1	2	3	4	Total
Redhawks	0	0	9	7	16
Panthers	6	6	0	7	19

=== At Tennessee State ===
	1	2	3	4	OT	Total
Panthers	7	3	0	0	9	19
No. 24 Tigers	0	7	0	3	6	16

=== Tennessee Tech ===
	1	2	3	4	Total
Golden Eagles	14	0	6	3	23
Panthers	0	3	14	7	24

=== At Murray State ===
	1	2	3	4	OT	Total
Panthers	0	14	7	0	6	27
Racers	7	0	0	14	3	24

=== Jacksonville State ===
	1	2	3	4	Total
No. 3 Gamecocks	0	9	14	7	30
Panthers	7	7	0	0	14

=== At UT Martin ===
	1	2	3	4	Total
Panthers	3	0	7	0	10
Skyhawks	10	7	7	3	27

=== Eastern Kentucky ===
	1	2	3	4	OT	Total
Colonels	7	3	3	7	0	20
Panthers	7	3	3	7	3	23

=== At Austin Peay ===
	1	2	3	4	Total
Panthers	0	6	0	7	13
Governors	7	7	7	7	28
