= 2021 Tennessee State Tigers football team =

American college football season

2021 Tennessee State Tigers football
- Conference: Ohio Valley Conference
- Record: 5–6 (3–3 OVC)
- Head coach: Eddie George (1st season)
- Offensive coordinator: Hue Jackson (1st season)
- Offensive scheme: Pro-style
- Defensive coordinator: Brandon Fisher (1st season)
- Base defense: Multiple 3–3–5
- Home stadium: Nissan Stadium

2021 Ohio Valley Conference football standings
	Conf.			Overall
Team	W		L	W		L
No. 13 UT Martin $^	5	–	1	10	–	3
Southeast Missouri State	4	–	2	4	–	7
Austin Peay	4	–	2	6	–	5
Tennessee State	3	–	3	5	–	6
Murray State	3	–	3	6	–	5
Eastern Illinois	1	–	5	1	–	10
Tennessee Tech	1	–	5	3	–	8
$ – Conference champion; ^ – FCS playoff participant; Rankings from STATS Poll

The 2021 Tennessee State Tigers football team represented Tennessee State University during the 2021 NCAA Division I FCS football season as a member of the Ohio Valley Conference (OVC). They were led by first-year head coach Eddie George and played their games at Nissan Stadium in Nashville, Tennessee.

On April 12, 2021, Tennessee State University announced that Rod Reed would not return as head coach. The following day, Tennessee State hired George to replace him. It was revealed by The Tennessean that George's deal was a five-year deal with an annual salary of US$400,000.

== Schedule ==
Date	Time	Opponent	Site	TV	Result	Attendance
September 5	3:00 p.m.	vs. Grambling State*	Tom Benson Hall of Fame Stadium; Canton, OH (Black College Football Hall of Fame Classic)	NFLN	L 10–16	14,682
September 11	6:00 p.m.	vs. Jackson State*	Liberty Bowl Memorial Stadium; Memphis, TN (Southern Heritage Classic)	ESPN3/ESPNU	L 16–38	46,171
September 18	4:00 p.m.	Kentucky State*	Nissan Stadium; Nashville, TN	ESPN+	W 41–7	2,513
September 25	2:00 p.m.	at Southeast Missouri State	Houck Stadium; Cape Girardeau, MO	ESPN+	L 14–47	3,896
October 2	7:00 p.m.	at Austin Peay*	Fortera Stadium; Clarksville, TN	ESPN+	W 24–22	7,211
October 16	2:00 p.m.	Tennessee Tech	Nissan Stadium; Nashville, TN (Sgt. York Trophy)	ESPN+	W 20–13 ^{OT}	2,420
October 23	2:00 p.m.	at Eastern Illinois	O'Brien Field; Charleston, IL	ESPN+	W 28–0	6,300
October 30	5:00 p.m.	Murray State^{†}	Nissan Stadium; Nashville, TN	ESPN+	W 27–21	8,627
November 6	2:00 p.m.	at No. 15 UT Martin	Graham Stadium; Martin, TN (Sgt. York Trophy)	ESPN3	L 20–41	3,712
November 13	2:00 p.m.	Austin Peay	Nissan Stadium; Nashville, TN (Sgt. York Trophy)	ESPN+	L 7–36	2,531
November 20	11:00 a.m.	at No. 25 (FBS) Mississippi State*	Davis Wade Stadium; Starkville, MS	ESPN+/SECN+	L 10–55	46,770
*Non-conference game; ^{†}Homecoming; Rankings from STATS Poll released prior to the game; All times are in Central time

== Game summaries ==
=== At Grambling State ===
Tennessee State Tigers at Grambling State Tigers

Quarter	1	2	3	4	Total
Tennessee State	3	0	7	0	10
Grambling State	0	7	6	3	16

at Pro Football Hall of Fame Fieldhouse, Canton, OH

- Date: September 5, 2021
- Game time: 3:00 P.M. MST
- Game weather: 61 °F (16 °C) • Weather: Sunny • Wind: 3 mph
- Game attendance: 14,682
- Referee:
- TV announcers (NFL Network):

Statistics	TSU Tigers	GRAM Tigers
First downs		
Plays–yards	–	–
Rushes–yards	–	–
Passing yards		
Passing: comp–att–int	––	––
Turnovers		
Time of possession		

Team	Category	Player	Statistics
TSU Tigers	Passing		
TSU Tigers	Rushing		
TSU Tigers	Receiving		
GRAM Tigers	Passing		
GRAM Tigers	Rushing		
GRAM Tigers	Receiving		

Scoring summary

Quarter	Time	Drive			Team	Scoring information	Score	
Quarter	Time	Plays	Yards	TOP	Team	Scoring information	TSU	GRAM
1	5:00	7	21	4:05	TENN	39-yard field goal by Antonio Zita	3	0
2	12:41	15	79	7:14	GRAM	Jaye Patrick 18-yard touchdown reception from Elijah Walker, Garrett Urban kick good	3	7
3	7:03	12	58	6:08	TENN	Devon Starling 3-yard touchdown run, Antonio Zita kick good	10	7
3	2:22	3	15	1:25	GRAM	Elijah Walker 15-yard touchdown run, Antonio Zita kick no good	10	13
4	9:48	10	44	5:05	GRAM	24-yard field goal by Garrett Urban	10	16
"TOP" = time of possession. For other American football terms, see Glossary of American football.							10	16

=== Vs. Jackson State ===
Tennessee State vs. Jackson State

Team	1	2	3	4	Total
TSU Tigers	0	7	0	9	16
• JSU Tigers	7	3	14	14	38

- Date: September 11, 2021
- Location: Liberty Bowl Memorial Stadium
  Memphis, TN
- Game start: 6:00 p.m. CDT
- Elapsed time: 3:22
- Game attendance: 46,171
- Game weather: • Weather: – • Wind: –
- Referee:
- TV announcers (ESPN3/ESPNU):

Scoring summary
Q1	0:19	JSU	Joshua Lanier 14-yard pass from Shedeur Sanders (Glenn Misiak kick)	0–7
Q2	9:36	TSU	Deveon Bryant 2-yard run (Antonio Zita kick)	7–7
Q2	0:32	JSU	Glenn Misiak 28-yard field goal	7–10
Q3	11:30	JSU	Keith Corbin 67-yard pass from Shedeur Sanders (Glenn Misiak kick)	7–17
Q3	2:22	JSU	Shane Hooks 10-yard pass from Shedeur Sanders (Glenn Misiak kick)	7–24
Q4	13:17	TSU	Chayil Garnett 37-yard field goal	10–24
Q4	7:29	JSU	Warren Newman 81-yard punt return (Glenn Misiak kick)	10–31
Q4	2:55	JSU	Peytton Pickett 4-yard run (Glenn Misiak kick)	10–38
Q4	0:06	TSU	Rodell Rahmaan 47-yard pass from Geremy Hickbottom (2-point fail)	16–38

Statistics	Tennessee State	Jackson State
First downs	19	19
Total yards	264	404
Rushing yards	70	42
Passing yards	194	362
Turnovers	1	1
Time of possession	31:52	28:08

Team	Category	Player	Statistics
Tennessee State	Passing	Geremy Hickbottom	9/15, 138 yards, 1 TD
Tennessee State	Rushing	Devon Starling	11 carries, 35 yards
Tennessee State	Receiving	Rodell Rahmaan	4 receptions, 94 yards, 1 TD
Jackson State	Passing	Shedeur Sanders	30/40, 362 yards, 3 TD
Jackson State	Rushing	Peytton Pickett	11 carries, 55 yards, 1 TD
Jackson State	Receiving	Trevonte Rucker	5 receptions, 72 yards

=== At No. 25 (FBS) Mississippi State ===
Team	1	2	3	4	Total
Tennessee State	0	0	0	10	10
• No. 25 (FBS) Mississippi State	21	14	14	6	55

- Date:
  November 20
- Location:
  Starkville, MS
- Game start: 11:02 a.m.
- Game attendance: 46,770
- Game weather: 55, Sunny, Wind SE @ 8 mph
- Referee: Daniel Gautreaux
- TV announcers (ESPN+/SECN+): Mike Couzens (play-by-play), Dustin Fox (analyst)

Statistics	Tenn State	MSU
First downs	14	23
Total yards	205	600
Rushing yards	35	107
Passing yards	170	493
Turnovers	1	2
Time of possession	35:20	24:40

Team	Category	Player	Statistics
Tennessee State	Passing	Deveon Bryant	9/11, 128 yards
Tennessee State	Rushing	Devon Starling	11 carries, 33 yards
Tennessee State	Receiving	Cam Wyche	4 receptions, 88 yards
Mississippi State	Passing	Will Rogers	28/34, 391 yards, 5 TD
Mississippi State	Rushing	Dillon Johnson	5 carries, 56 yards, 1 TD
Mississippi State	Receiving	Makai Polk	9 receptions, 110 yards, 1 TD

== Coaching staff ==
Name	Position	Seasons at Tennessee State	Alma mater
Eddie George	Head coach	1st	Ohio State
Hue Jackson	Offensive coordinator & quarterbacks coach	1st	Pacific
Brandon Fisher	Defensive coordinator	1st	Montana
Joe Bowden	Linebackers coach	1st	Alcorn State
Keith Burns	Special teams coordinator & defensive specialist	1st	Oklahoma State
Cory Harkey	Tight ends coach	1st	UCLA
Mark Hutson	Offensive line coach	1st	Oklahoma
Richard McNutt	Defensive backs coach	1st	Ohio State
Pepe Pearson	Running backs coach	1st	Ohio State
Clyde Simmons	Defensive line coach	1st	Western Carolina
Kenan Smith	Wide receivers coach	1st	Sacramento State
