= 2021 Tennessee Tech Golden Eagles football team =

American college football season

2021 Tennessee Tech Golden Eagles football
- Conference: Ohio Valley Conference
- Record: 3–8 (1–5 OVC)
- Head coach: Dewayne Alexander (4th season)
- Offensive coordinator: Doug Malone (2nd season)
- Offensive scheme: Spread
- Defensive coordinator: Donnie Suber (4th season)
- Base defense: 4–2–5
- Home stadium: Tucker Stadium

2021 Ohio Valley Conference football standings
	Conf.			Overall
Team	W		L	W		L
No. 13 UT Martin $^	5	–	1	10	–	3
Southeast Missouri State	4	–	2	4	–	7
Austin Peay	4	–	2	6	–	5
Tennessee State	3	–	3	5	–	6
Murray State	3	–	3	6	–	5
Eastern Illinois	1	–	5	1	–	10
Tennessee Tech	1	–	5	3	–	8
$ – Conference champion; ^ – FCS playoff participant; Rankings from STATS Poll

The 2021 Tennessee Tech Golden Eagles football team represented Tennessee Technological University as a member of the Ohio Valley Conference (OVC) during the 2021 NCAA Division I FCS football season. Led by fourth-year head coach Dewayne Alexander, the Golden Eagles compiled an overall record of 3–8 with a mark of 1–5 in conference play, tying for sixth place in the OVC. Tech Golden played home games at Tucker Stadium in Cookeville, Tennessee.

== Schedule ==
Date	Time	Opponent	Site	TV	Result	Attendance
September 2	6:00 p.m.	at Samford*	Seibert Stadium; Homewood, AL	ESPN+	L 14–52	3,177
September 11	1:30 p.m.	Furman*	Tucker Stadium; Cookeville, TN	ESPN+	L 0–26	8,911
September 18	11:00 a.m.	at Tennessee*	Neyland Stadium; Knoxville, TN	ESPN+/SECN+	L 0–56	80,053
September 25	1:30 p.m.	Eastern Illinois	Tucker Stadium; Cookeville, TN	ESPN+	L 14–28	3,125
October 2	1:30 p.m.	Southeast Missouri State	Tucker Stadium; Cookeville, TN	ESPN+	W 28–17	3,655
October 9	1:00 p.m.	at North Carolina Central*	O'Kelly–Riddick Stadium; Durham, NC	ESPN+	W 27–16	2,810
October 16	2:00 p.m.	at Tennessee State	Nissan Stadium; Nashville, TN (Sgt. York Trophy)	ESPN+	L 13–20 ^{OT}	2,420
October 23	1:30 p.m.	Virginia–Lynchburg*	Tucker Stadium; Cookeville, TN	ESPN+	W 56–13	3,487
November 6	1:00 p.m.	at Murray State	Roy Stewart Stadium; Murray, KY	ESPN+	L 27–32	6,506
November 13	1:30 p.m.	No. 13 UT Martin	Tucker Stadium; Cookeville, TN (Sgt. York Trophy)	ESPN+	L 3–42	9,604
November 20	2:00 p.m.	at Austin Peay	Fortera Stadium; Clarksville, TN (Sgt. York Trophy)	ESPN3	L 20–48	5,237
*Non-conference game; Rankings from STATS Poll released prior to the game; All times are in Central time
