= 2021 Murray State Racers football team =

American college football season

2021 Murray State Racers football
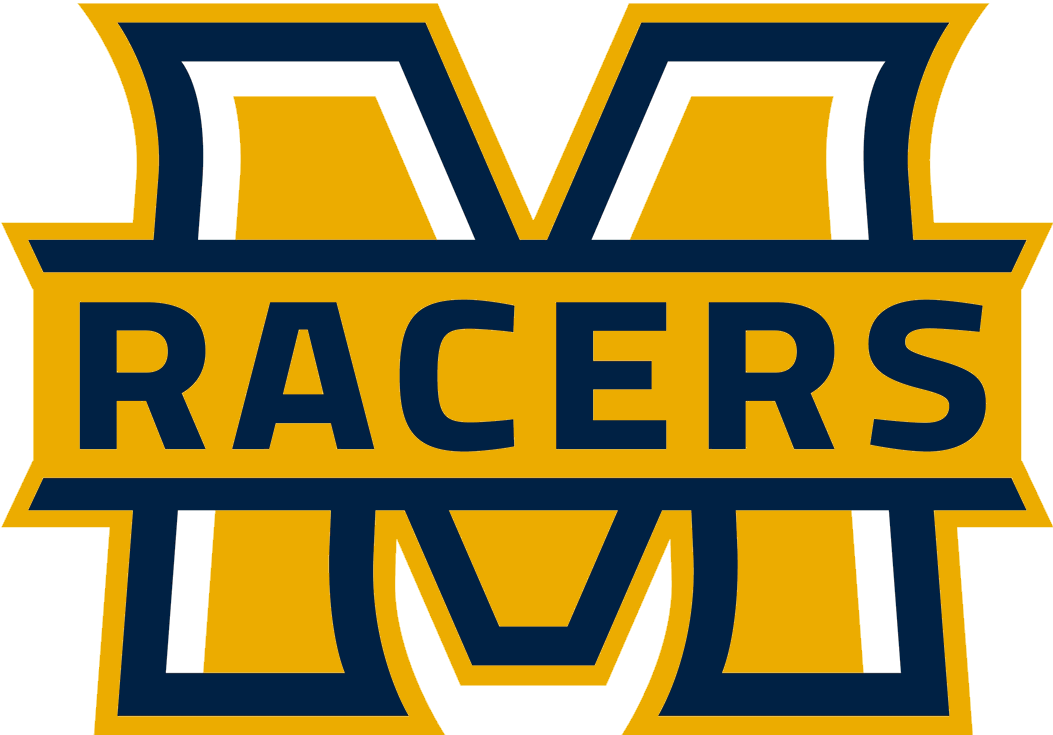
- Conference: Ohio Valley Conference
- Record: 6–5 (3–3 OVC)
- Head coach: Dean Hood (2nd season)
- Offensive coordinator: Ben Hodges (2nd season)
- Defensive coordinator: Dillon Sanders (2nd season)
- Home stadium: Roy Stewart Stadium

2021 Ohio Valley Conference football standings
	Conf.			Overall
Team	W		L	W		L
No. 13 UT Martin $^	5	–	1	10	–	3
Southeast Missouri State	4	–	2	4	–	7
Austin Peay	4	–	2	6	–	5
Tennessee State	3	–	3	5	–	6
Murray State	3	–	3	6	–	5
Eastern Illinois	1	–	5	1	–	10
Tennessee Tech	1	–	5	3	–	8
$ – Conference champion; ^ – FCS playoff participant; Rankings from STATS Poll

The 2021 Murray State Racers football team represented Murray State University during the 2021 NCAA Division I FCS football season as a member of the Ohio Valley Conference (OVC). They were led by second-year head coach Dean Hood and played their games at Roy Stewart Stadium in Murray, Kentucky.

== Schedule ==
Date	Time	Opponent	Site	TV	Result	Attendance
September 2	7:00 p.m.	Mississippi Valley State*	Roy Stewart Stadium; Murray, KY	ESPN+	W 35–0	6,874
September 11	2:30 p.m.	at No. 7 (FBS) Cincinnati*	Nippert Stadium; Cincinnati, OH	ESPN+	L 7–42	33,498
September 18	4:00 p.m.	at Bowling Green*	Doyt Perry Stadium; Bowling Green, OH	ESPN3	L 10–27	20,097
October 2	4:00 p.m.	Eastern Illinois*	Roy Stewart Stadium; Murray, KY	ESPN+	W 22–6	9,502
October 9	2:00 p.m.	at No. 21 UT Martin	Graham Stadium; Martin, TN	ESPN+	L 24–48	7,111
October 16	2:00 p.m.	at Southeast Missouri State*	Houck Stadium; Cape Girardeau, MO	ESPN+	W 32–31	3,682
October 23	2:00 p.m.	Austin Peay	Roy Stewart Stadium; Murray, KY	ESPN3	L 6-47	10,023
October 30	5:00 p.m.	at Tennessee State	Nissan Stadium; Nashville, TN	ESPN+	L 21–27	8,627
November 6	1:00 p.m.	Tennessee Tech	Roy Stewart Stadium; Murray, KY	ESPN+	W 32–27	6,506
November 13	1:00 p.m.	Southeast Missouri State	Roy Stewart Stadium; Murray, KY	ESPN3	W 28–10	6,313
November 20	12:00 p.m.	at Eastern Illinois	O'Brien Field; Charleston, IL	ESPN+	W 20–13	1,850
*Non-conference game; Rankings from STATS Poll released prior to the game; All times are in Central time

== Games summaries ==
=== Mississippi Valley State ===
Mississippi Valley State at Murray State

Team	1	2	Total
Delta Devils			0
Racers			0

- Date: September 2, 2021
- Location: Roy Stewart Stadium
  Murray, KY
- Game start: 7:00 p.m. CDT
- Elapsed time:
- Game attendance:
- Game weather: • Weather: TBD • Wind: TBD
- Referee:
- TV announcers (ESPN+):

Scoring summary
1
2
3
4

Statistics	Mississippi Valley State	Murray State
First downs		
Total yards		
Rushing yards		
Passing yards		
Turnovers		
Time of possession		

Team	Category	Player	Statistics
Mississippi Valley State	Passing		
Mississippi Valley State	Rushing		
Mississippi Valley State	Receiving		
Murray State	Passing		
Murray State	Rushing		
Murray State	Receiving		

=== at No. 7 (FBS) Cincinnati ===
Murray State at Cincinnati

Team	1	2	3	4	Total
Racers	0	7	0	0	7
• No. 7 Bearcats	0	7	14	21	42

- Date: September 11, 2021
- Location: Nippert Stadium
  Cincinnati, OH
- Game start: 3:35 p.m. EDT
- Elapsed time: 3 hours and 10 minutes
- Game attendance: 33,498
- Game weather: 83 °F (28 °C) • Weather: Sunny • Wind: N/A
- Referee: Tim Rich
- TV announcers (ESPN+): Connor Onion (play-by-play), Bobby Carpenter (analyst)

Scoring summary
2	13:41	MUR	Preston Rice 1-yard run (Aaron Baum kick) (12 plays, 65 yards, 7:31)	MUR 7–0
2	09:41	CIN	Noah Davis 2-yard pass from Desmond Ridder (Cole Smith kick) (6 plays, 40 yards, 2:16)	7–7
3	10:05	CIN	Jerome Ford 13-yard run (Cole Smith kick) (10 plays, 75 yards, 4:50)	CIN 7–14
3	04:58	CIN	Jerome Ford 8-yard run (Cole Smith kick) (8 plays, 55 yards, 3:08)	CIN 7–21
4	14:13	CIN	Tyler Scott 23-yard pass from Desmond Ritter (Cole Smith kick) (1 plays, 23 yards, 0:06)	CIN 7–28
4	10:50	CIN	Jerome Ford 3-yard run (Cole Smith kick) (4 plays, 63 yards, 2:09)	CIN 7–35
4	01:08	CIN	Payten Singletary 18-yard pass from Evan Prater (Cole Smith kick) (1 plays, 18 yards, 0:07)	CIN 7–42

Statistics	MUR	CIN
First downs	15	17
Total yards	242	391
Rushing yards	93	130
Passing yards	149	261
Time of possession	34:48	25:12

Team	Category	Player	Statistics
MUR	Passing	Preston Rice	17/29, 149 yards, 3 INT
MUR	Rushing	Damonta Witherspoon	16 carries, 52 yards
MUR	Receiving	Deshun Britten	5 receptions, 58 yards
CIN	Passing	Desmond Ridder	14/22, 243 yards, 2 TD
CIN	Rushing	Jerome Ford	18 carries, 113 yards, 3 TD
CIN	Receiving	Tyler Scott	4 receptions, 74 yards, 1 TD
