= 2020 Tennessee State Tigers football team =

American college football season

2020 Tennessee State Tigers football
- Conference: Ohio Valley Conference
- Record: 2–5 (2–5 OVC)
- Head coach: Rod Reed (11th season)
- Offensive coordinator: Shannon Harris (2nd season)
- Home stadium: Hale Stadium

2020 Ohio Valley Conference football standings
	Conf.			Overall
Team	W		L	W		L
No. 8 Jacksonville State $^	6	–	1	10	–	3
No. 19 Murray State	5	–	2	5	–	2
No. 21 Austin Peay	4	–	2	4	–	5
Southeast Missouri State	4	–	3	4	–	4
UT Martin	3	–	4	3	–	4
Tennessee Tech	2	–	5	2	–	5
Tennessee State	2	–	5	2	–	5
Eastern Illinois	1	–	5	1	–	5
$ – Conference champion; ^ – FCS playoff participant; Note: Eastern Kentucky played only in the fall and opted out of the spring season.; Rankings from STATS Poll

The 2020 Tennessee State Tigers football team represented Tennessee State University in the 2020–21 NCAA Division I FCS football season. They were led by eleventh-year head coach Rod Reed and played their home games at Hale Stadium. They competed as a member of the Ohio Valley Conference.

== Schedule ==
Tennessee State had games scheduled against Southern on September 5, and Jackson State on September 12, which were later canceled before the start of the 2020 season.

Date	Time	Opponent	Site	TV	Result	Attendance
February 28	2:00 p.m.	at Austin Peay	Fortera Stadium; Clarksville, TN (Sgt. York Trophy)	ESPN+	L 20–27	831
March 7	2:00 p.m.	No. 10 Jacksonville State	Hale Stadium; Nashville, TN	ESPN+	L 16–38	2,160
March 14	1:00 p.m.	Eastern Illinois	Hale Stadium; Nashville, TN	ESPN+	W 21–20	1,855
March 21	2:00 p.m.	at No. 25 Murray State	Roy Stewart Stadium; Murray, KY	ESPN+	L 13–35	2,545
March 28	2:00 p.m.	UT Martin^{†}	Hale Stadium; Nashville, TN (Sgt. York Trophy)	ESPN+	W 26–24	1,587
April 3	1:00 p.m.	at Tennessee Tech	Tucker Stadium; Cookeville, TN (Sgt. York Trophy)	ESPN+	L 10–24	1,747
April 11	2:30 p.m.	Southeast Missouri State	Hale Stadium; Nashville, TN	ESPN+	L 23–46	2,187
^{†}Homecoming; Rankings from STATS Poll released prior to the game; All times are in Central time
