= 2020 UT Martin Skyhawks football team =

American college football season

2020 UT Martin Skyhawks football
- Conference: Ohio Valley Conference
- Record: 3–4 (3–4 OVC)
- Head coach: Jason Simpson (15th season)
- Offensive coordinator: Kevin Bannon (5th season)
- Defensive coordinator: Chris Polizzi (1st season)
- Home stadium: Graham Stadium

2020 Ohio Valley Conference football standings
	Conf.			Overall
Team	W		L	W		L
No. 8 Jacksonville State $^	6	–	1	10	–	3
No. 19 Murray State	5	–	2	5	–	2
No. 21 Austin Peay	4	–	2	4	–	5
Southeast Missouri State	4	–	3	4	–	4
UT Martin	3	–	4	3	–	4
Tennessee Tech	2	–	5	2	–	5
Tennessee State	2	–	5	2	–	5
Eastern Illinois	1	–	5	1	–	5
$ – Conference champion; ^ – FCS playoff participant; Note: Eastern Kentucky played only in the fall and opted out of the spring season.; Rankings from STATS Poll

The 2020 UT Martin Skyhawks football team represented the University of Tennessee at Martin as a member of the Ohio Valley Conference (OVC) during the 2020–21 NCAA Division I FCS football season. Led by 15th-year head coach Jason Simpson, the Skyhawks compiled an overall record of 3–4 with an identical mark in conference play, placing fifth in the OVC. UT Martin played home games at Graham Stadium in Martin, Tennessee.

== Schedule ==
UT Martin had a game scheduled against Alabama, which was canceled due to the COVID-19 pandemic.

Date	Time	Opponent	Site	TV	Result	Attendance
February 28	2:00 p.m.	at Murray State	Roy Stewart Stadium; Murray, KY	ESPN+	L 10–14	2,528
March 7	1:00 p.m.	Eastern Illinois	Graham Stadium; Martin, TN	ESPN+	W 28–15	1,500
March 14	1:00 p.m.	No. 11 Jacksonville State	Graham Stadium; Martin, TN	ESPN+	L 20–37	1,500
March 21	2:00 p.m.	at Austin Peay	Fortera Stadium; Clarksville, TN (Sgt. York Trophy)	ESPN+	W 37–34	1,530
March 28	2:00 p.m.	at Tennessee State	Hale Stadium; Nashville, TN (Sgt. York Trophy)	ESPN+	L 24–26	1,587
April 3	1:00 p.m.	Southeast Missouri State	Graham Stadium; Martin, TN	ESPN+	L 16–21	1,500
April 11	3:00 p.m.	Tennessee Tech	Graham Stadium; Martin, TN (Sgt. York Trophy)	ESPN+	W 40–7	1,500
Rankings from STATS Poll released prior to the game; All times are in Central time
