= 2021 Southeast Missouri State Redhawks football team =

American college football season

2021 Southeast Missouri State Redhawks football
- Conference: Ohio Valley Conference
- Record: 4–7 (4–2 OVC)
- Head coach: Tom Matukewicz (8th season)
- Offensive coordinator: Jeromy McDowell (4th season)
- Defensive coordinator: Bryce Saia (8th season)
- Home stadium: Houck Stadium

2021 Ohio Valley Conference football standings
	Conf.			Overall
Team	W		L	W		L
No. 13 UT Martin $^	5	–	1	10	–	3
Southeast Missouri State	4	–	2	4	–	7
Austin Peay	4	–	2	6	–	5
Tennessee State	3	–	3	5	–	6
Murray State	3	–	3	6	–	5
Eastern Illinois	1	–	5	1	–	10
Tennessee Tech	1	–	5	3	–	8
$ – Conference champion; ^ – FCS playoff participant; Rankings from STATS Poll

The 2021 Southeast Missouri State Redhawks football team represented Southeast Missouri State University as a member of the Ohio Valley Conference (OVC) during the 2021 NCAA Division I FCS football season. Led by eighth-year head coach Tom Matukewicz, the Redhawks compiled an overall record of 4–7 with a mark of 4–2 in conference play, tying for second place in the OVC. Southeast Missouri State played home games at Houck Stadium in Cape Girardeau, Missouri.

== Schedule ==
Date	Time	Opponent	Site	TV	Result	Attendance
September 2	7:30 p.m.	No. 7 Southern Illinois*	Houck Stadium; Cape Girardeau, MO	ESPN+	L 21–47	4,075
September 11	7:00 p.m.	at No. 1 Sam Houston*	Bowers Stadium; Huntsville, TX	ESPN+	L 14–52	7,728
September 18	12:00 p.m.	at Missouri*	Faurot Field; Columbia, MO	ESPN+/SECN+	L 28–59	46,598
September 25	3:00 p.m.	Tennessee State	Houck Field; Cape Girardeau, MO	ESPN+	W 47–14	3,896
October 2	2:30 p.m.	at Tennessee Tech	Tucker Stadium; Cookeville, TN	ESPN+	L 17–28	3,655
October 9	4:00 p.m.	at Austin Peay	Fortera Stadium; Clarksville, TN	ESPN+	W 30–14	6,729
October 16	3:00 p.m.	Murray State*	Houck Field; Cape Girardeau, MO	ESPN+	L 31–32	3,682
October 23	3:00 p.m.	at No. 13 UT Martin*	Graham Stadium; Martin, TN	ESPN+	L 30–38	2,230
October 30	2:00 p.m.	Eastern Illinois	Houck Field; Cape Girardeau, MO	ESPN+	W 38–15	3,773
November 13	2:00 p.m.	at Murray State	Roy Stewart Stadium; Murray, KY	ESPN+	L 10–28	6,313
November 20	2:00 p.m.	No. 13 UT Martin	Houck Field; Cape Girardeau, MO	ESPN+	W 31-14	3,219
*Non-conference game; Rankings from STATS Poll released prior to the game; All times are in Central time
