= 2020 Eastern Illinois Panthers football team =

American college football season

2020 Eastern Illinois Panthers football
- Conference: Ohio Valley Conference
- Record: 1–5 (1–5 OVC)
- Head coach: Adam Cushing (2nd season)
- Offensive coordinator: John Kuceyeski (2nd season)
- Defensive coordinator: Chris Bowers (2nd season)
- Home stadium: O'Brien Field

2020 Ohio Valley Conference football standings
	Conf.			Overall
Team	W		L	W		L
No. 8 Jacksonville State $^	6	–	1	10	–	3
No. 19 Murray State	5	–	2	5	–	2
No. 21 Austin Peay	4	–	2	4	–	5
Southeast Missouri State	4	–	3	4	–	4
UT Martin	3	–	4	3	–	4
Tennessee Tech	2	–	5	2	–	5
Tennessee State	2	–	5	2	–	5
Eastern Illinois	1	–	5	1	–	5
$ – Conference champion; ^ – FCS playoff participant; Note: Eastern Kentucky played only in the fall and opted out of the spring season.; Rankings from STATS Poll

The 2020 Eastern Illinois Panthers football team represented Eastern Illinois University as a member of the Ohio Valley Conference (OVC) during the 2020–21 NCAA Division I FCS football season. Led by second-year head coach Adam Cushing, the Panthers compiled an overall record of 1–5 overall with an identical mark in conference play, placing last out of eight teams in the OVC. Eastern Illinois played home games at O'Brien Field in Charleston, Illinois.

== Schedule ==
Eastern Illinois had a game against Kentucky, which was canceled due to the COVID-19 pandemic.

Date	Time	Opponent	Site	TV	Result	Attendance
February 28	2:00 p.m.	No. 21 Southeast Missouri State	O'Brien Field; Charleston, IL	ESPN+	L 7–47	1,252
March 7	1:00 p.m.	at UT Martin	Graham Stadium; Martin, TN	ESPN+	L 15–28	1,500
March 14	1:00 p.m.	at Tennessee State	Hale Stadium; Nashville, TN	ESPN+	L 20–21	1,855
March 21	1:00 p.m.	Tennessee Tech	O'Brien Field; Charleston, IL	ESPN+	W 28–20	1,282
March 28	2:00 p.m.	at No. 19 Murray State	Roy Stewart Stadium; Murray, KY	ESPN+	L 27–41	2,628
April 3	1:00 p.m.	No. 12 Jacksonville State	O'Brien Field; Charleston, IL	ESPN+	L 23–44	1,312
April 11	1:00 p.m.	No. 25 Austin Peay	O'Brien Field; Charleston, IL	ESPN+	Postponed	
Rankings from STATS Poll released prior to the game; All times are in Central time
