= 2020 Jacksonville State Gamecocks football team =

American football team

2020 Jacksonville State Gamecocks football

OVC champion

NCAA Division I Quarterfinal, L 14–20 vs. Delaware
- Conference: Ohio Valley Conference

Ranking
- STATS: No. 7
- FCS Coaches: No. 7
- Record: 10–3 (6–1 OVC)
- Head coach: John Grass (7th season)
- Offensive coordinator: Jimmy Ogle (21st season)
- Co-defensive coordinators: William Green (2nd season); Owen Kilgore (2nd season)
- Home stadium: Burgess–Snow Field at JSU Stadium

2020 Ohio Valley Conference football standings
	Conf.			Overall
Team	W		L	W		L
No. 8 Jacksonville State $^	6	–	1	10	–	3
No. 19 Murray State	5	–	2	5	–	2
No. 21 Austin Peay	4	–	2	4	–	5
Southeast Missouri State	4	–	3	4	–	4
UT Martin	3	–	4	3	–	4
Tennessee Tech	2	–	5	2	–	5
Tennessee State	2	–	5	2	–	5
Eastern Illinois	1	–	5	1	–	5
$ – Conference champion; ^ – FCS playoff participant; Note: Eastern Kentucky played only in the fall and opted out of the spring season.; Rankings from STATS Poll

The 2020 Jacksonville State Gamecocks football team represented Jacksonville State University as a member of the Ohio Valley Conference (OVC) during the 2020–21 NCAA Division I FCS football season. Led by seventh-year head coach John Grass, the Gamecocks compiled an overall record of 10–3, with a mark of 6–1 conference play, winning the OVC title. Jacksonville State received the OVC's automatic bid to the NCAA Division I Football Championship. The Gamecocks defeated Davidson in the first round before losing to Delaware in the quarterfinals. The team played home games at Burgess–Snow Field at JSU Stadium in Jacksonville, Alabama.

== Schedule ==
Date	Time	Opponent	Rank	Site	TV	Result	Attendance
October 3	3:00 p.m.	at Florida State*		Doak Campbell Stadium; Tallahassee, FL	ESPN3	L 24–41	13,589
October 10	2:00 p.m.	Mercer*		Burgess–Snow Field at JSU Stadium; Jacksonville, AL	ESPN+	W 34–28	5,870
October 17	1:00 p.m.	at North Alabama*		Braly Municipal Stadium; Florence, AL	ESPN+	W 24–17	4,632
October 23	6:00 p.m.	at FIU*		Riccardo Silva Stadium; Miami, FL	ESPN+	W 19–10	1,041
February 28	3:00 p.m.	No. 23 Tennessee Tech	No. 16	Burgess–Snow Field at JSU Stadium; Jacksonville, AL	ESPN+	W 27–10	9,355
March 7	2:00 p.m.	at Tennessee State	No. 10	Hale Stadium; Nashville, TN	ESPN+	W 38–16	2,160
March 14	1:00 p.m.	at UT Martin	No. 11	Graham Stadium; Martin, TN	ESPN+	W 37–20	1,500
March 21	2:00 p.m.	Southeast Missouri State	No. 8	Burgess–Snow Field at JSU Stadium; Jacksonville, AL	ESPN+	W 21–3	8,355
March 28	2:00 p.m.	Austin Peay	No. 7	JSU Stadium; Jacksonville, AL	ESPN+	L 10–13	7,702
April 3	1:00 p.m.	at Eastern Illinois	No. 12	O'Brien Field; Charleston, IL	ESPN+	W 44–23	1,312
April 11	2:00 p.m.	at No. 17 Murray State	No. 10	Roy Stewart Stadium; Murray, KY	ESPN+	W 28–14	3,211
April 24	2:00 p.m.	Davidson	No. 8	Burgess–Snow Field at JSU Stadium; Jacksonville, AL (NCAA Division I First Round)	ESPN3	W 49–14	
May 2	2:00 p.m.	No. 5 Delaware	No. 8	Burgess–Snow Field at JSU Stadium; Jacksonville, AL (NCAA Division I Quarterfinal)	ESPN3	L 14–20	
*Non-conference game; Rankings from STATS Poll released prior to the game; All times are in Central time
