= 2020 Eastern Kentucky Colonels football team =

American college football season

2020 Eastern Kentucky Colonels football

Opportunity Bowl champion
- Conference: Ohio Valley Conference
- Record: 3–6 (0–0 OVC)
- Head coach: Walt Wells (1st season)
- Offensive coordinator: Andy Richman (1st season)
- Defensive coordinator: Jake Johnson (1st season)
- Home stadium: Roy Kidd Stadium

2020 Ohio Valley Conference football standings
	Conf.			Overall
Team	W		L	W		L
No. 8 Jacksonville State $^	6	–	1	10	–	3
No. 19 Murray State	5	–	2	5	–	2
No. 21 Austin Peay	4	–	2	4	–	5
Southeast Missouri State	4	–	3	4	–	4
UT Martin	3	–	4	3	–	4
Tennessee Tech	2	–	5	2	–	5
Tennessee State	2	–	5	2	–	5
Eastern Illinois	1	–	5	1	–	5
$ – Conference champion; ^ – FCS playoff participant; Note: Eastern Kentucky played only in the fall and opted out of the spring season.; Rankings from STATS Poll

The 2020 Eastern Kentucky Colonels football team represented Eastern Kentucky University during the 2020–21 NCAA Division I FCS football season. They were led by Walt Wells in his first season as the program's 15th head coach. The Colonels played their home games at Roy Kidd Stadium and competed as a member of the Ohio Valley Conference.

== Schedule ==
While the Ohio Valley Conference moved conference games to the spring of 2021, due to the COVID-19 pandemic, while allowing member schools to play four non-conference games in the fall of 2020, Eastern Kentucky scheduled eight non-conference games for the fall of 2020.

Date	Time	Opponent	Site	TV	Result	Attendance
September 5	1:00 p.m.	at Marshall*	Joan C. Edwards Stadium; Huntington, WV	ESPN	L 0–59	12,001
September 12	12:00 p.m.	at West Virginia*	Milan Puskar Stadium; Morgantown, WV	FS1	L 10–56	976
September 26	1:00 p.m.	at The Citadel*	Johnson Hagood Stadium; Charleston, SC	ESPN+	W 37–14	3,081
October 3	3:00 p.m.	Houston Baptist*	Roy Kidd Stadium; Richmond, KY	ESPN+	L 30–33	2,916
October 17	7:00 p.m.	at Troy*	Veterans Memorial Stadium; Troy, AL	ESPN3	L 29–31	10,500
October 24	3:00 p.m.	No. 11 Central Arkansas*^{†}	Roy Kidd Stadium; Richmond, KY	ESPN+	W 31–28	2,932
November 7	3:00 p.m.	Stephen F. Austin*	Roy Kidd Stadium; Richmond, KY	ESPN+	L 6–24	2,569
November 14	4:00 p.m.	at No. 11 Central Arkansas*	Estes Stadium; Conway, AR	ESPN+	L 25–37	2,000
November 21	3:00 p.m.	Western Carolina*	Roy Kidd Stadium; Richmond, KY (Opportunity Bowl)	ESPN+	W 49–17	3,009
*Non-conference game; ^{†}Homecoming; Rankings from STATS Poll released prior to the game; All times are in Eastern time

== Game summaries ==
=== At Marshall ===
Game One – Eastern Kentucky Colonels at Marshall Thundering Herd

Quarter	1	2	3	4	Total
Colonels	0	0	0	0	0
Thundering Herd	21	17	14	7	59

at Joan C. Edwards Stadium • Huntington, West Virginia

- Date: Saturday, September 5, 2020
- Game time: 1:00 p.m. EDT
- Game weather: Clear • Temperature: 77 °F (25 °C) • Wind: ENE 3 mph
- TV announcers (ESPN): Jason Benetti (play-by-play), Andre Ware (analyst), Katie George (sideline)

Game information

First quarter

- (12:19) MRSH – Xavier Gaines 22 yard pass from Grant Wells, Shane Ciucci kick (Drive: 7 plays, 72 yards, 2:41; Marshall 7–0)
- (8:04) MRSH – Brendan Knox 8 yard rush, Shane Ciucci kick (Drive: 4 plays, 70 yards, 1:31; Marshall 14–0)
- (2:01) MRSH – Talik Keaton 21 yard pass from Grant Wells, Shane Ciucci kick (Drive: 5 plays, 65 yards, 2:05; Marshall 21–0)

Second quarter

- (10:02) MRSH – Garet Morrell 2 yard pass from Grant Wells, Shane Ciucci kick (Drive: 15 plays, 72 yards, 6:12; Marshall 28–0)
- (6:07) MRSH – Shane Ciucci 23 yard field goal (Drive: 7 plays, 49 yards, 1:37; Marshall 31–0)
- (3:07) MRSH – Jaron Woodyard 42 yard pass from Grant Wells, Shane Ciucci kick (Drive: 1 play, 42 yards, 0:06; Marshall 38–0)

Third quarter

- (7:04) MRSH – Sheldon Evans 6 yard rush, Shane Ciucci kick (Drive: 12 plays, 90 yards, 5:05; Marshall 45–0)
- (0:43) MRSH – Lawrence Papillon 13 yard rush, Shane Ciucci kick (Drive: 7 plays, 63 yards, 2:47; Marshall 52–0)

Fourth quarter

- (4:02) MRSH – Amir Richardson 3 yard pass from Luke Zban, Shane Ciucci kick (Drive: 15 plays, 75 yards, 8:22; Marshall 59–0)

Statistics	EKU	MRSH
First downs	7	34
Plays–yards	47–166	83–627
Rushes–yards	31–86	54–282
Passing yards	80	345
Passing: comp–att–int	10–16–1	22–29–0
Time of possession	25:37	34:23

Team	Category	Player	Statistics
Eastern Kentucky	Passing	Parker McKinney	7/10, 71 yards, 1 INT
Eastern Kentucky	Rushing	Quentin Pringle	6 carries, 39 yards
Eastern Kentucky	Receiving	Keyion Dixon	3 receptions, 34 yards
Marshall	Passing	Grant Wells	16/23, 307 yards, 4 TD
Marshall	Rushing	Knowledge McDaniel	14 carries, 93 yards
Marshall	Receiving	Talik Keaton	2 receptions, 68 yards, 1 TD

=== At West Virginia ===
Eastern Kentucky Colonels (0–1) vs. West Virginia Mountaineers (0–0)

Quarter	1	2	3	4	Total
Eastern Kentucky	0	7	3	0	10
West Virginia	14	28	7	7	56

at Milan Puskar Stadium • Morgantown, WV

- Date: Saturday, September 12, 2020
- Game time: 12:00 p.m. EDT
- Game weather: mostly cloudy, 88°F
- TV: FS1

Game information

First quarter

Second quarter

Third quarter

Fourth quarter

Statistics	EKU	WVU
First downs	9	31
Total yards	206	624
Rushes/yards	75	329
Passing yards	131	295
Passing: Comp–Att–Int	9-17-1	25-35-0
Time of possession	24:17	35:43

Team	Category	Player	Statistics
Eastern Kentucky	Passing	Peyton McKinney	9-17, 131 yds, 1 TD, 1 INT
Eastern Kentucky	Rushing	Alonzo Booth	7 carries, 45 yds
Eastern Kentucky	Receiving	Keyion Dixon	3 receptions, 53 yds, 1 TD
West Virginia	Passing	Jarret Doege	19–25, 228 yds, 3 TD
West Virginia	Rushing	Alec Sinkfield	15 carries, 123 yds, 2 TD
West Virginia	Receiving	Sam James	5 receptions, 72 yds, 1 TD

=== At The Citadel ===
	1	2	3	4	Total
Colonels	13	10	7	7	37
Bulldogs	7	7	0	0	14

=== Houston Baptist ===
Houston Baptist Huskies at Eastern Kentucky Colonels

Quarter	1	2	3	4	Total
Huskies	14	10	7	2	33
Colonels	7	0	10	13	30

at Roy Kidd Stadium, Richmond, Kentucky

- Date: October 3
- Game time: 3:00 p.m. EDT
- Game weather: Cloudy 43% Humidity • Temperature: 62–69 °F (17–21 °C) • Wind: 1-3 SW MPH
- Game attendance: 2,916
- Referee: Steve Hazle
- TV: ESPN3
- Box score, Recap

Game information

First quarter

- HBU – Vernon Harrell 8-yard pass from Bailey Zappe (Gino Garcia kick), 7:45. Huskies 7–0. Drive: 6 plays, 49 yards, 1:12.
- HBU – Jerreth Sterns 42-yard pass from Bailey Zappe (Gino Garcia kick), 6:01. Huskies 14–0. Drive: 2 plays, 57 yards, 0:21.

EKU – Matt Wilcox Jr. 10-yard pass from Parker McKinney (Alexander Woznick kick), 1:32. Huskies 14–7. Drive: 11 plays, 75 yards, 4:29.

Second quarter

- HBU – Gino Garcia 24-yard field goal, 14:01. Huskies 17–7. Drive: 9 plays, 68 yards, 2:31.
- HBU – Dreshawn Minnieweather 1-yard run (Gino Garcia kick), 0:43. Huskies 24–7. Drive: 7 plays, 43 yards, 2:49.

Third quarter

- EKU – Matt Wilcox Jr. 7-yard pass from Parker McKinney (Alexander Woznick kick), 10:53. Huskies 24–14. Drive: 10 plays, 75 yards, 4:07.
- EKU – Alexander Woznick 26-yard field goal, 1:36. Huskies 24–17. Drive: 10 plays, 55 yards, 4:25.
- HBU – Josh Sterns 65-yard pass from Bailey Zappe (Gino Garcia kick), 0:38. Huskies 31–17. Drive: 3 plays, 70 yards, 0:58.

Fourth quarter

- EKU – Alonzo Booth 29-yard run (A. Woznick kick), 13:21. Huskies 31–24. Drive: 8 plays, 75 yards, 2:17.
- EKU – Keyion Dixon 27-yard pass from Parker McKinney (Alexander Woznick kick blocked), 4:04. Huskies 31–30. Drive: 12 plays, 80 yards, 6:22.
- HBU – Tra Fluellen 98-yard PAT return, 4:04. Huskies 33–30

Statistics	HBU	EKU
First downs	24	26
Total yards	520	480
Rushing yards	140	184
Passing yards	380	296
Turnovers	0	3
Time of possession	27:41	32:19

Team	Category	Player	Statistics
Houston Baptist	Passing	Bailey Zappe	35/46, 380 yards, 3 TD
Houston Baptist	Rushing	Dreshawn Minnieweather	9 rushes, 38 yards, TD
Houston Baptist	Receiving	Vernon Harrell	10 receptions, 98 yards, TD
Eastern Kentucky	Passing	Parker McKinney	25/40, 296 yards, 3 TD, 2 INT
Eastern Kentucky	Rushing	Alonzo Booth	17 rushes, 108 yards, TD
Eastern Kentucky	Receiving	Keyion Dixon	6 receptions, 112 yards, TD

=== At Troy ===
Eastern Kentucky at Troy

Team	1	2	3	4	Total
Colonels	7	10	0	12	29
• Trojans	14	7	7	3	31

- Date: October 17, 2020
- Location: Veterans Memorial Stadium
  Troy, AL
- Game start: 2:35 p.m. CDT
- Elapsed time: 3 hours and 37 minutes
- Game attendance: 10,500
- Game weather: 71 °F (22 °C) • Weather: Clear • Wind: W 5 MPH
- Referee: Marshall Lewis
- TV announcers (ESPN3): Will Kollmeyer (play–by–play) and Ben Stanfield (analyst)

Scoring summary
1	12:53	TROY	AJ Lewis 16-yard pass from Gunnar Watson (Evan Legassey kick) (6 plays, 91 yards, 2:07)	TROY 7–0
1	06:38	EKU	Keyion Dixon 90-yard pass from Parker McKinney (Alexander Woznick kick) (2 plays, 96 yards, 0:45)	TIE 7–7
1	03:16	TROY	Khalil McClain 9-yard pass from Gunnar Watson (Evan Legassey kick) (8 plays, 60 yards, 3:22)	TROY 14–7
2	13:37	EKU	Alexander Woznick 19-yard field goal (4 plays, 1 yard, 1:34)	TROY 14–10
2	04:49	EKU	Alonzo Both 12-yard rush (Alexander Woznick kick) (14 plays, 85 yards, 6:45)	EKU 17–14
2	02:26	TROY	Kimani Vidal 1-yard rush (Evan Legassey kick) (7 plays, 77 yards, 2:23)	TROY 21–17
3	09:35	TROY	Reggie Todd 22-yard pass from Gunnar Watson (Evan Legassey kick); 8 plays, 80 yards, 2:33)	TROY 28–17
4	14:41	EKU	Alexander Woznick 22-yard field goal (9 plays, 42 yards, 3:25)	TROY 28–20
4	05:50	EKU	Alexander Woznick 25-yard field goal (4 plays, 22 yards, 1:43)	TROY 28–23
4	00:21	EKU	Keyion Dixon 4-yard pass from Parker McKinney (two-point pass conversion attempt failed) (10 plays, 80 yards, 2:28)	EKU 29–28
4	00:00	TROY	Evan Legassey 47-yard field goal (3 plays, 30 yards, 0:21)	TROY 31–29

Statistics	Eastern Kentucky	Troy
First downs	21	27
Total yards	425	507
Rushing yards	55	174
Passing yards	370	333
Turnovers	1	3
Time of possession	34:12	25:48

Team	Category	Player	Statistics
Eastern Kentucky	Passing	Parker McKinney	30/47, 370 yards, 2 TDs, 1 INT
Eastern Kentucky	Rushing	Alonzo Booth	15 carries, 39 yards, 1 TD
Eastern Kentucky	Receiving	Keyion Dixon	8 receptions, 196 yards, 2 TDs
Troy	Passing	Gunnar Watson	26/38, 333 yards, 3 TDs, 2 INTs
Troy	Rushing	Kimani Vidal	13 carries, 143 yards, 1 TD
Troy	Receiving	Kaylon Geiger	7 receptions, 100 yards

=== No. 11 Central Arkansas ===
	1	2	3	4	Total
No. 11 Bears	0	7	7	14	28
Colonels	0	17	0	14	31

=== Stephen F. Austin ===
	1	2	3	4	Total
Lumberjacks	14	0	7	3	24
Colonels	0	3	3	0	6

=== At No. 11 Central Arkansas ===
	1	2	3	4	Total
Colonels	0	9	16	0	25
No. 11 Bears	17	7	0	13	37

=== Western Carolina ===
	1	2	3	4	Total
Catamounts	0	10	0	7	17
Colonels	7	14	0	28	49
