= 2021 Austin Peay Governors football team =

American college football season

2021 Austin Peay Governors football
- Conference: Ohio Valley Conference
- Record: 6–5 (4–2 OVC)
- Head coach: Scotty Walden (2nd season)
- Co-offensive coordinators: Josh Cochran (2nd season); Austin Silvoy (2nd season)
- Offensive scheme: Spread
- Co-defensive coordinators: Chris Kappas (2nd season); Akeem Davis (2nd season)
- Base defense: 4–2–5
- Home stadium: Fortera Stadium

2021 Ohio Valley Conference football standings
	Conf.			Overall
Team	W		L	W		L
No. 13 UT Martin $^	5	–	1	10	–	3
Southeast Missouri State	4	–	2	4	–	7
Austin Peay	4	–	2	6	–	5
Tennessee State	3	–	3	5	–	6
Murray State	3	–	3	6	–	5
Eastern Illinois	1	–	5	1	–	10
Tennessee Tech	1	–	5	3	–	8
$ – Conference champion; ^ – FCS playoff participant; Rankings from STATS Poll

The 2021 Austin Peay Governors football team represented Austin Peay State University during the 2021 NCAA Division I FCS football season as a member of the Ohio Valley Conference (OVC). They were led by second-year head coach Scotty Walden and played their games at Fortera Stadium in Clarksville, Tennessee.

== Schedule ==
Date	Time	Opponent	Rank	Site	TV	Result	Attendance
September 2	6:30 p.m.	at No. 18 Chattanooga*	No. 25	Finley Stadium; Chattanooga, TN	ESPN+	W 30–20	8,115
September 11	6:30 p.m.	at No. 20 (FBS) Ole Miss*	No. 17	Vaught–Hemingway Stadium; Oxford, MS	ESPN+/SECN+	L 17–54	47,848
September 18	2:00 p.m.	Morehead State*	No. 19	Fortera Stadium; Clarksville, TN	ESPN+	W 59–35	4,821
September 25	2:00 p.m.	at Eastern Kentucky*	No. 19	Roy Kidd Stadium; Richmond, KY		L 27–35	13,081
October 2	7:00 p.m.	Tennessee State		Fortera Stadium; Clarksville, TN	ESPN+	L 22–24	7,211
October 9	3:00 p.m.	Southeast Missouri State		Fortera Stadium; Clarksville, TN	ESPN+	L 14–30	6,729
October 23	2:00 p.m.	at Murray State		Roy Stewart Stadium; Murray, KY	ESPN3	W 47–6	10,023
October 30	2:00 p.m.	at No. 13 UT Martin		Graham Stadium; Martin, TN (Sgt. York Trophy)	ESPN+	L 16–17	2,117
November 6	2:00 p.m.	Eastern Illinois		Fortera Stadium; Clarksville, TN	ESPN+	W 42–26	4,088
November 13	2:00 p.m.	at Tennessee State		Nissan Stadium; Nashville, TN (Sgt. York Trophy)	ESPN+	W 36–7	2,531
November 20	2:00 p.m.	Tennessee Tech		Fortera Stadium; Clarksville, TN (Sgt. York Trophy)	ESPN3	W 48–20	5,237
*Non-conference game; Rankings from STATS Poll released prior to the game; All times are in Central time
