= 2020 Southeast Missouri State Redhawks football team =

American college football season

2020 Southeast Missouri State Redhawks football
- Conference: Ohio Valley Conference
- Record: 4–4 (4–3 OVC)
- Head coach: Tom Matukewicz (7th season)
- Offensive coordinator: Jeromy McDowell (3rd season)
- Defensive coordinator: Bryce Saia (7th season)
- Home stadium: Houck Stadium

2020 Ohio Valley Conference football standings
	Conf.			Overall
Team	W		L	W		L
No. 8 Jacksonville State $^	6	–	1	10	–	3
No. 19 Murray State	5	–	2	5	–	2
No. 21 Austin Peay	4	–	2	4	–	5
Southeast Missouri State	4	–	3	4	–	4
UT Martin	3	–	4	3	–	4
Tennessee Tech	2	–	5	2	–	5
Tennessee State	2	–	5	2	–	5
Eastern Illinois	1	–	5	1	–	5
$ – Conference champion; ^ – FCS playoff participant; Note: Eastern Kentucky played only in the fall and opted out of the spring season.; Rankings from STATS Poll

The 2020 Southeast Missouri State Redhawks football team represented Southeast Missouri State University as a member of the Ohio Valley Conference (OVC) during the 2020–21 NCAA Division I FCS football season. Led by seventh-year head coach Tom Matukewicz, the Redhawks compiled an overall record of 4–4 with a mark of 4–3 in conference play, placing fourth in the OVC. Southeast Missouri State played home games at Houck Stadium in Cape Girardeau, Missouri.

== Schedule ==
Southeast Missouri State released their full schedule on February 24, 2020. The Redhawks football team had games scheduled against Dayton and Ole Miss, which were canceled before the start of the 2020 season.

Date	Time	Opponent	Rank	Site	TV	Result	Attendance
October 23	6:00 p.m.	at No. 24 Southern Illinois*	No. 25	Saluki Stadium; Carbondale, IL	ESPN+	L 17–20	0
February 28	2:00 p.m.	at Eastern Illinois	No. 21	O'Brien Field; Charleston, IL	ESPN+	W 47–7	1,252
March 7	2:00 p.m.	Murray State	No. 16	Houck Stadium; Carbondale, IL	ESPN+	L 21–24	2,638
March 14	2:00 p.m.	Austin Peay		Houck Stadium; Carbondale, IL	ESPN+	L 42–49 ^{2OT}	2,201
March 21	2:00 p.m.	at No. 8 Jacksonville State		JSU Stadium; Jacksonville, AL	ESPN+	L 3–21	8,355
March 28	2:00 p.m.	Tennessee Tech		Houck Stadium; Carbondale, IL	ESPN+	W 24–21	1,879
April 3	1:00 p.m.	at UT Martin		Graham Stadium; Martin, TN	ESPN+	W 21–16	1,500
April 11	2:30 p.m.	at Tennessee State		Hale Stadium; Nashville, TN	ESPN+	W 46–23	2,187
*Non-conference game; Rankings from STATS Poll released prior to the game; All times are in Central time
