= 2017 UT Martin Skyhawks football team =

American college football season

2017 UT Martin Skyhawks football
- Conference: Ohio Valley Conference
- Record: 6–5 (4–4 OVC)
- Head coach: Jason Simpson (12th season)
- Offensive coordinator: Kevin Bannon (2nd season)
- Defensive coordinator: Jordon Hankins (1st season)
- Home stadium: Graham Stadium

2017 Ohio Valley Conference football standings
	Conf.			Overall
Team	W		L	W		L
No. 9 Jacksonville State $^	8	–	0	10	–	2
Austin Peay	7	–	1	8	–	4
Eastern Illinois	5	–	3	6	–	5
UT Martin	4	–	4	6	–	5
Eastern Kentucky	3	–	5	4	–	7
Southeast Missouri State	3	–	5	3	–	8
Tennessee State	2	–	5	6	–	5
Murray State	2	–	5	3	–	8
Tennessee Tech	1	–	7	1	–	10
$ – Conference champion; ^ – FCS playoff participant; Rankings from STATS Poll

The 2017 UT Martin Skyhawks football team represented the University of Tennessee at Martin as a member of the Ohio Valley Conference (OVC) during the 2017 NCAA Division I FCS football season. Led by 12th-year head coach Jason Simpson, the Skyhawks compiled an overall record of 6–6 with a mark of 4–4 in conference play, placing fourth in the OVC. UT Martin played home games at Graham Stadium in Martin, Tennessee.

== Schedule ==
Date	Time	Opponent	Rank	Site	TV	Result	Attendance
August 31	6:00 p.m.	Clarion*		Graham Stadium; Martin, TN	OVCDN	W 36–0	1,103
September 9	11:00 a.m.	at Ole Miss*		Vaught–Hemingway Stadium; Oxford, MS	SECN	L 23–45	60,476
September 16	5:00 p.m.	at No. 15 Chattanooga*		Finley Stadium; Chattanooga, TN	ESPN3	W 21–7	10,141
September 23	4:00 p.m.	No. 20 Tennessee State	No. 24	Graham Stadium; Martin, TN (Sgt. York Trophy)	ESPN3	W 31–16	6,484
September 30	6:00 p.m.	at Austin Peay	No. 18	Fortera Stadium; Clarksville, TN (Sgt. York Trophy)	OVCDN	L 0–7	8,812
October 7	2:00 p.m.	Murray State^{†}	No. 25	Graham Stadium; Martin, TN	OVCDN	L 10–13	4,618
October 21	2:00 p.m.	at Eastern Kentucky		Roy Kidd Stadium; Richmond, KY	OVCDN	L 21–31	9,420
October 28	2:00 p.m.	Eastern Illinois		Graham Stadium; Martin, TN	ESPN3	W 27–10	1,682
November 4	1:00 p.m.	at Southeast Missouri State		Houck Stadium; Cape Girardeau, MO	OVCDN	W 16–14	2,185
November 11	2:00 p.m.	No. 2 Jacksonville State		Graham Stadium; Martin, TN	ESPN3	L 7–14	2,493
November 18	1:30 p.m.	at Tennessee Tech		Tucker Stadium; Cookeville, TN (Sgt. York Trophy)	OVCDN	W 24–0	2,159
*Non-conference game; ^{†}Homecoming; Rankings from STATS Poll released prior to the game; All times are in Central time

== Ranking movements ==
Ranking movements Legend: ██ Increase in ranking ██ Decrease in ranking — = Not ranked RV = Received votes
	Week													
Poll	Pre	1	2	3	4	5	6	7	8	9	10	11	12	Final
STATS FCS	RV	RV	RV	24	18	25	RV	—	—	—	—	—	—	—
Coaches	—	—	—	RV	21	RV	—	—	—	—	—	—	—	—
