= Marcus Satterfield =

American football player and coach (born 1976)

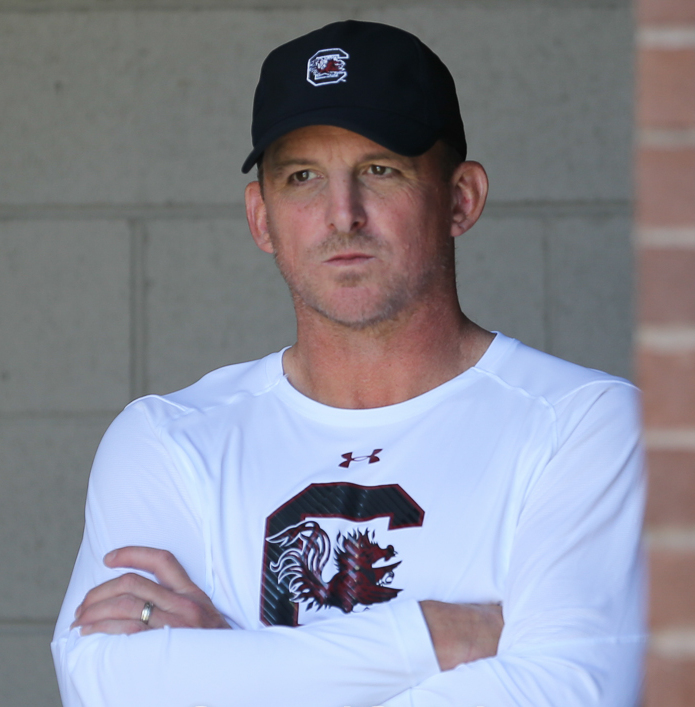
- Satterfield in 2022

Current position
- Title: Tight ends coach
- Team: Nebraska
- Conference: Big Ten

Biographical details
- Born: April 9, 1976 (age 50); Greenback, Tennessee, U.S.

Playing career
- 1995–1998: East Tennessee State
- Positions: Wide receiver, punter

Coaching career (HC unless noted)
- 1999–2000: Chattanooga (GA)
- 2001: Chattanooga (WR)
- 2002–2003: Tennessee (GA)
- 2004: Richmond (WR)
- 2005: Western Carolina (WR)
- 2006–2007: UT Martin (OC)
- 2008: UT Martin (AHC/PGC)
- 2009–2012: Chattanooga (OC)
- 2013–2014: Temple (OC/QB)
- 2015: Temple (OC/RB)
- 2016–2017: Tennessee Tech
- 2018–2019: Baylor (TE)
- 2020: Carolina Panthers (asst. OL)
- 2021–2022: South Carolina (OC/QB)
- 2023: Nebraska (OC/QB)
- 2024: Nebraska (OC/TE)
- 2024–present: Nebraska (TE)

Head coaching record
- Overall: 6–16

Marcus David Satterfield (born April 9, 1976) is an American football coach and former player. He is the tight ends coach at the University of Nebraska–Lincoln; he was previously the offensive coordinator for the 2023 season, and the first nine games of the 2024 season. Satterfield served as the head football coach at Tennessee Tech University from 2016 to 2017. He was the offensive coordinator at the University of Tennessee at Martin (2006–2008), the University of Tennessee at Chattanooga (2009–2012), and Temple University (2013–2014). He was an assistant coach at Richmond during the 2004 season and Western Carolina in 2005. Satterfield played college football at East Tennessee State University.

== Playing career ==
Satterfield was raised in Greenback, Tennessee, the son of Bill and Dora Jane Satterfield. His father, Bill Satterfield, has coached high school football since the early 1970s, including 24 years at Greenback, where he won a state championship in 1987. Marcus played for Greenback in the early 1990s. He initially lined up at wide receiver, but switched to quarterback during his senior season in 1993, when he led the Cherokees to a 10–3 record and a trip to the state quarterfinals.

Satterfield played wide receiver and punter at East Tennessee State University from 1995 to 1998. He helped the Bucs reach the NCAA Division I-AA playoffs in 1996. He finished his career at East Tennessee State with 124 catches and 11 touchdowns. He graduated with a B.A. in history in 1999.

== Coaching career ==
Satterfield worked as a graduate coach for the University of Tennessee at Chattanooga football staff from 1999 to 2000. He served as the Mocs' wide receivers coach for the 2001 season. In 2002, he joined the Tennessee Volunteers football staff as a graduate assistant, spending two seasons under the tutelage of offensive coordinator Randy Sanders. After leaving UT, he spent one season coaching wide receivers at Richmond (2004), and one season coaching the same position at Western Carolina (2005).

In 2006, Satterfield joined the University of Tennessee at Martin football staff as the Skyhawks' the passing game coordinator and running backs coach. In 2007, the Skyhawks led the Ohio Valley Conference (OVC) in total offense and points-per-game. In 2008, head coach Jason Simpson promoted Satterfield to associate head coach. That year, the Skyhawks led the conference in scoring offense, and finished 16th in the nation in total offense, with just over 405 yards-per-game. Skyhawks quarterback Cade Thompson and wide receiver Mike Hicks, both of whom had been coached by Satterfield, were named to the 2008 All-OVC team.

In January 2009, Satterfield was named offensive coordinator at the University of Tennessee at Chattanooga by the Mocs' new head coach, Russ Huesman (Satterfield and Huesman had previously worked together at Richmond in 2004). The Mocs' offense, which was one of the worst in Football Championship Subdivision (FCS) in 2008, substantially improved under Satterfield. In 2010, the Mocs, led by star quarterback B. J. Coleman, ranked third in the Southern Conference and 11th nationally in total offense (430 yards per game).

=== Temple ===
In December 2012, Satterfield joined the Temple University coaching staff that was being assembled by the Owls' newly hired head coach Matt Rhule. Rhule and Satterfield had both been assistants at Western Carolina during the 2005 season. In January 2013, Nick Rolovich, who had been tapped as the Owls' new offensive coordinator, backed out of the job, and Rhule offered the position to Satterfield.

Although Temple finished 2–10 during Satterfield's first year in 2013, the Owls' offense amassed nearly 400 yards per game, the most by a Temple squad since 1979. The Owls' rushing attack finished third in the American Athletic Conference with 149.3 yards per game.

=== Tennessee Tech ===
On January 4, 2016, Satterfield was named head football coach at Tennessee Technological University. He replaced long-time coach Watson Brown, who had retired following the 2015 season. Tennessee Tech finished the 2016 season 5–6 overall, and 5-3 in the Ohio Valley Conference, the team's first season with a winning conference record since 2011. The Golden Eagles capped the season with two strong wins over conference foes Tennessee State (44–16) and Murray State (55–19). Tennessee Tech fired Satterfield after just 2 seasons on November 19, 2017, following a 1–10 season and a last place finish in the Ohio Valley Conference.

=== Baylor ===
After serving three months as offensive coordinator at East Tennessee State, Satterfield was hired as tight ends coach by Matt Rhule at Baylor.

=== Carolina Panthers ===
In 2020, Satterfield followed Rhule to the Carolina Panthers, where he was named assistant offensive line coach.

=== South Carolina ===
On January 7, 2021, it was reported that Satterfield would join new head coach Shane Beamer's staff as offensive coordinator and quarterbacks coach at South Carolina, following the sudden departure of Mike Bobo to Auburn. In his first season at South Carolina, the Gamecocks finished 7–6 despite starting four different quarterbacks over the course of the year.

Satterfield's 2021 offense finished the regular season ranked 116th in yardage and 109th in scoring despite regularly getting the football in favorable field position due to a much-improved defense that forced 23 turnovers to tie for 11th in the nation in takeaways. While injuries to quarterbacks were cited as a contributing factor to the unusually poor offensive production, many Gamecock fans and sports writers questioned Satterfield's game plans and play-calling.

In 2022, the Gamecocks finished the regular season 8–4, with the last two regular season games being wins over highly ranked rivals Tennessee and Clemson. The Gamecocks scored 30 or more points in 9 games (including the bowl game) for the first time in school history and broke numerous offensive production records in Satterfield’s final season. Satterfield resigned from South Carolina before their loss to Notre Dame in the Gator Bowl to take the same position at Nebraska.

=== Nebraska ===
The move to Nebraska once again reunited Satterfield with Matt Rhule, who had just been hired as head coach. Toward the end of the 2024 season Nebraska hired Dana Holgorsen as offensive coordinator and demoted Satterfield to tight ends coach.

== Personal life ==
Satterfield is married to the former Sarah Houser. They have one daughter, Harper.

== Head coaching record ==
Year	Team	Overall	Conference	Standing	Bowl/playoffs
Tennessee Tech (Ohio Valley Conference) (2016–2017)
2016	Tennessee Tech	5–6	5–3	3rd	
2017	Tennessee Tech	1–10	1–7	9th	
Tennessee Tech:		6–16	6–10		
Total:		6–16			
