= 2017 Tennessee State Tigers football team =

American college football season

2017 Tennessee State Tigers football
- Conference: Ohio Valley Conference
- Record: 6–5 (2–5 OVC)
- Head coach: Rod Reed (8th season)
- Offensive coordinator: Jeff Parker (3rd season)
- Defensive coordinator: Garry Fisher (1st season)
- Home stadium: Nissan Stadium; Hale Stadium

2017 Ohio Valley Conference football standings
	Conf.			Overall
Team	W		L	W		L
No. 9 Jacksonville State $^	8	–	0	10	–	2
Austin Peay	7	–	1	8	–	4
Eastern Illinois	5	–	3	6	–	5
UT Martin	4	–	4	6	–	5
Eastern Kentucky	3	–	5	4	–	7
Southeast Missouri State	3	–	5	3	–	8
Tennessee State	2	–	5	6	–	5
Murray State	2	–	5	3	–	8
Tennessee Tech	1	–	7	1	–	10
$ – Conference champion; ^ – FCS playoff participant; Rankings from STATS Poll

The 2017 Tennessee State Tigers football team represented Tennessee State University as a member of the Ohio Valley Conference (OVC) in the 2017 NCAA Division I FCS football season. They were led by eighth-year head coach Rod Reed and played their home games at Nissan Stadium and Hale Stadium. Tennessee State finished the season 6–5 overall and 2–5 in OVC play to tie for seventh place.

== Schedule ==
Date	Time	Opponent	Rank	Site	TV	Result	Attendance
August 31	6:00 p.m.	at Georgia State*		Georgia State Stadium; Atlanta, GA	ESPN3	W 17–10	24,333
September 9	6:00 p.m.	vs. Jackson State*	No. 23	Liberty Bowl Memorial Stadium; Memphis, TN (Southern Heritage Classic)	FSS	W 17–15	47,407
September 16	5:00 p.m.	vs. Florida A&M*	No. 22	Raymond James Stadium; Tampa, FL (Tampa Classic)	RV	W 24–13	17,102
September 23	4:00 p.m.	at No. 24 UT Martin	No. 20	Graham Stadium; Martin, TN (Sgt. York Trophy)	ESPN3	L 16–31	6,484
September 30	6:00 p.m.	Eastern Illinois	No. 24	Nissan Stadium; Nashville, TN (John Merritt Classic)	ESPN3	L 16–19 ^{2OT}	11,013
October 7	5:00 p.m.	at Eastern Kentucky		Roy Kidd Stadium; Richmond, KY	OVCDN	W 45–21	8,410
October 14	6:00 p.m.	Austin Peay^{†}		Nissan Stadium; Nashville, TN	OVCDN	L 17–21	21,127
October 28	1:30 p.m.	at Tennessee Tech		Tucker Stadium; Cookeville, TN	OVCDN	L 26–30	5,235
November 4	2:00 p.m.	Virginia–Lynchburg*		Hale Stadium; Nashville, TN	OVCDN	W 60–0	7,487
November 11	2:00 p.m.	Southeast Missouri State		Nissan Stadium; Nashville, TN	OVCDN	W 23–20	8,693
November 16	6:00 p.m.	at No. 2 Jacksonville State		JSU Stadium; Jacksonville, AL	OVCDN	L 6–36	18,782
*Non-conference game; ^{†}Homecoming; Rankings from STATS Poll released prior to the game; All times are in Central time

== Game summaries ==
=== At Georgia State ===
	1	2	3	4	Total
Tigers	3	7	7	0	17
Panthers	0	3	0	7	10

=== vs Jackson State ===
	1	2	3	4	Total
JSU Tigers	3	6	0	6	15
No. 23 TSU Tigers	10	0	0	7	17

=== vs Florida A&M ===
	1	2	3	4	Total
No. 22 Tigers	3	7	7	7	24
Rattlers	0	6	0	7	13

=== At UT Martin ===
	1	2	3	4	Total
No. 20 Tigers	0	9	7	0	16
No. 24 Skyhawks	17	7	7	0	31

=== Eastern Illinois ===
	1	2	3	4	OT	Total
Panthers	7	3	0	0	9	19
No. 24 Tigers	0	7	0	3	6	16

=== At Eastern Kentucky ===
	1	2	3	4	Total
Tigers	3	14	0	28	45
Colonels	0	0	14	7	21

=== Austin Peay ===
	1	2	3	4	Total
Governors	7	0	7	7	21
Tigers	3	0	7	7	17

=== At Tennessee Tech ===
	1	2	3	4	Total
Tigers	7	10	7	2	26
Golden Eagles	13	7	7	3	30

=== Virginia–Lynchburg ===
	1	2	3	4	Total
Dragons	0	0	0	0	0
Tigers	21	17	10	12	60

=== Southeast Missouri State ===
	1	2	3	4	Total
Redhawks	6	0	7	7	20
Tigers	6	7	0	10	23

=== At Jacksonville State ===
	1	2	3	4	Total
Tigers	0	0	6	0	6
No. 2 Gamecocks	0	10	14	12	36

== Ranking movements ==
Ranking movements Legend: ██ Increase in ranking ██ Decrease in ranking — = Not ranked RV = Received votes
	Week													
Poll	Pre	1	2	3	4	5	6	7	8	9	10	11	12	Final
STATS FCS	RV	23	22	20	24	RV	RV	—	—	—	—	—	—	—
Coaches	RV	24	24	20	24	RV	RV	—	—	—	—	—	—	—
