= Adam Cushing =

American football player and coach (born 1980)

Current position
- Title: Offensive line coach
- Team: Texas A&M
- Conference: SEC

Biographical details
- Born: May 29, 1980 (age 46)

Playing career
- 1998–2001: Chicago
- Position: Tight end

Coaching career (HC unless noted)
- 2002–2003: La Verne (GA)
- 2004–2008: Northwestern (TE)
- 2009–2018: Northwestern (OL)
- 2019–2021: Eastern Illinois
- 2022–2023: Duke (OL)
- 2024–present: Texas A&M (OL/RGC)

Head coaching record
- Overall: 3–26

Adam Cushing (born May 29, 1980) is an American college football coach. He is currently the offensive line coach at Texas A&M University. Cushing served as the head football coach at Eastern Illinois University from 2019 to 2021, compiling a record of 3–26. A native of Chicago, Cushing played college football at the University of Chicago.

== Head coaching record ==
Year	Team	Overall	Conference	Standing	Bowl/playoffs
Eastern Illinois Panthers (Ohio Valley Conference) (2019–2021)
2019	Eastern Illinois	1–11	1–7	9th	
2020	Eastern Illinois	1–5	1–5	8th	
2021	Eastern Illinois	1–10	1–5	T–6th	
Eastern Illinois:		3–26	3–17		
Total:		3–26			
