= 2017 Jacksonville State Gamecocks football team =

American college football season

2017 Jacksonville State Gamecocks football

OVC champion

NCAA Division I Second Round, L 7–17 vs. Kennesaw State
- Conference: Ohio Valley Conference

Ranking
- STATS: No. 9
- FCS Coaches: No. 10
- Record: 10–2 (8–0 OVC)
- Head coach: John Grass (4th season)
- Offensive coordinator: Jimmy Ogle (18th season)
- Co-defensive coordinators: David Blackwell (4th season); Brandon Hall (4th season)
- Home stadium: Burgess–Snow Field at JSU Stadium

2017 Ohio Valley Conference football standings
	Conf.			Overall
Team	W		L	W		L
No. 9 Jacksonville State $^	8	–	0	10	–	2
Austin Peay	7	–	1	8	–	4
Eastern Illinois	5	–	3	6	–	5
UT Martin	4	–	4	6	–	5
Eastern Kentucky	3	–	5	4	–	7
Southeast Missouri State	3	–	5	3	–	8
Tennessee State	2	–	5	6	–	5
Murray State	2	–	5	3	–	8
Tennessee Tech	1	–	7	1	–	10
$ – Conference champion; ^ – FCS playoff participant; Rankings from STATS Poll

The 2017 Jacksonville State Gamecocks football team represented Jacksonville State University as a member of the Ohio Valley Conference (OVC) during the 2017 NCAA Division I FCS football season. Led by fourth-year head coach John Grass, the Gamecocks compiled an overall record of 10–2 with a mark of 8–0 in conference play, winning the OVC title for the fourth consecutive season. Jacksonville State received the OVC's automatic bid to the NCAA Division I Football Championship playoffs as the No. 3 overall seed, marking the program's fifth straight trip to the FCS playoffs. After a first-round, the Gamecocks were upset by Kennesaw State in the second round. The team played home games at Burgess–Snow Field at JSU Stadium in Jacksonville, Alabama.

On October 14, the Gamecocks won their 27th straight OVC conference game, setting the conference record for consecutive games won.

== Schedule ==
Date	Time	Opponent	Rank	Site	TV	Result	Attendance
August 26	5:30 p.m.	vs. No. 12 Chattanooga*	No. 6	Cramton Bowl; Montgomery, AL (FCS Kickoff)	ESPN	W 27–13	12,952
September 9	11:30 a.m.	at Georgia Tech*	No. 5	Bobby Dodd Stadium; Atlanta, GA	ACCRSN	L 10–37	50,161
September 23	6:00 p.m.	No. 16 Liberty*	No. 5	Burgess–Snow Field at JSU Stadium; Jacksonville, AL	WEAC TV-24, OVCDN	W 31–10	23,944
September 30	6:00 p.m.	at Tennessee Tech	No. 5	Tucker Stadium; Cookeville, TN	WEAC TV-24, OVCDN	W 34–7	8,327
October 7	4:00 p.m.	at Austin Peay	No. 4	Fortera Stadium; Clarksville, TN	WEAC TV-24, OVCDN	W 34–14	7,102
October 14	3:00 p.m.	Eastern Kentucky	No. 3	Burgess–Snow Field at JSU Stadium; Jacksonville, AL	ESPN3	W 41–25	18,045
October 21	2:00 p.m.	at Eastern Illinois	No. 3	O'Brien Field; Charleston, IL	ESPN3	W 30–14	8,176
October 28	3:00 p.m.	Southeast Missouri State^{†}	No. 3	Burgess–Snow Field at JSU Stadium; Jacksonville, AL	WEAC TV-24; OVCDN	W 23–7	15,692
November 4	1:00 p.m.	Murray State	No. 3	Burgess–Snow Field at JSU Stadium; Jacksonville, AL	WEAC TV-24, OVCDN	W 59–23	16,453
November 11	2:00 p.m.	at UT Martin	No. 2	Graham Stadium; Martin, TN	WEAC TV-24, OVCDN	W 14–7	2,493
November 16	6:00 p.m.	Tennessee State	No. 2	Burgess–Snow Field at JSU Stadium; Jacksonville, AL	WEAC TV-24, OVCDN	W 36–6	18,782
December 2	1:00 p.m.	No. 18 Kennesaw State*	No. 2	Burgess–Snow Field at JSU Stadium; Jacksonville, AL (NCAA Division I Second Round)	ESPN3	L 7–17	17,412
*Non-conference game; ^{†}Homecoming; Rankings from STATS Poll released prior to the game; All times are in Central time

== Ranking movements ==
Ranking movements Legend: ██ Increase in ranking ██ Decrease in ranking т = Tied with team above or below ( ) = First-place votes
	Week													
Poll	Pre	1	2	3	4	5	6	7	8	9	10	11	12	Final
STATS FCS	6 (1)	5	5	5	5	4	3	3	3	3	2	2	2	10
Coaches	5	5	7	7	5т	4	3	3	3	3	2	2	2	9

== Game summaries ==
=== vs Chattanooga ===
	1	2	3	4	Total
No. 6 Gamecocks	10	0	10	7	27
No. 12 Mocs	3	3	0	7	13

=== At Georgia Tech ===
	1	2	3	4	Total
No. 5 Gamecocks	0	7	3	0	10
Yellow Jackets	3	7	20	7	37

=== Liberty ===
	1	2	3	4	Total
No. 16 Flames	3	0	7	0	10
No. 5 Gamecocks	0	14	10	7	31

=== At Tennessee Tech ===
	1	2	3	4	Total
No. 5 Gamecocks	7	7	6	14	34
Golden Eagles	0	0	7	0	7

=== At Austin Peay ===
	1	2	3	4	Total
No. 4 Gamecocks	14	6	7	7	34
Governors	0	7	0	7	14

=== Eastern Kentucky ===
	1	2	3	4	Total
Colonels	0	3	7	15	25
No. 3 Gamecocks	14	17	3	7	41

=== At Eastern Illinois ===
	1	2	3	4	Total
No. 3 Gamecocks	0	9	14	7	30
Panthers	7	7	0	0	14

=== Southeast Missouri State ===
	1	2	3	4	Total
Redhawks	7	0	0	0	7
No. 3 Gamecocks	7	6	0	10	23

=== Murray State ===
	1	2	3	4	Total
Racers	13	0	0	10	23
No. 3 Gamecocks	7	21	10	21	59

=== At UT Martin ===
	1	2	3	4	Total
No. 2 Gamecocks	7	7	0	0	14
Skyhawks	0	0	7	0	7

=== Tennessee State ===
	1	2	3	4	Total
Tigers	0	0	6	0	6
No. 2 Gamecocks	0	10	14	12	36

=== Kennesaw State—NCAA Division I Second Round ===
	1	2	3	4	Total
No. 18 Owls	0	3	7	7	17
No. 2 Gamecocks	0	7	0	0	7
