= 2021 Eastern Illinois Panthers football team =

American college football season

2021 Eastern Illinois Panthers football
- Conference: Ohio Valley Conference
- Record: 1–10 (1–5 OVC)
- Head coach: Adam Cushing (3rd season)
- Offensive coordinator: John Kuceyeski (3rd season)
- Defensive coordinator: Chris Bowers (3rd season)
- Home stadium: O'Brien Field

2021 Ohio Valley Conference football standings
	Conf.			Overall
Team	W		L	W		L
No. 13 UT Martin $^	5	–	1	10	–	3
Southeast Missouri State	4	–	2	4	–	7
Austin Peay	4	–	2	6	–	5
Tennessee State	3	–	3	5	–	6
Murray State	3	–	3	6	–	5
Eastern Illinois	1	–	5	1	–	10
Tennessee Tech	1	–	5	3	–	8
$ – Conference champion; ^ – FCS playoff participant; Rankings from STATS Poll

The 2021 Eastern Illinois Panthers football team represented Eastern Illinois University as a member of the Ohio Valley Conference (OVC) during the 2021 NCAA Division I FCS football season. Led by Adam Cushing in his third and final season as head coach, the Panthers compiled an overall record of 1–10 with a mark of 1–5 in conference play, tying for sixth place in the OVC. The team played home games at O'Brien Field in Charleston, Illinois.

== Preseason ==
=== Preseason coaches' poll ===
The OVC released their preseason coaches' poll on July 19, 2021. The Panthers were picked to finish in last place.

=== Preseason All-OVC team ===
The Panthers had two players selected to the preseason all-OVC team.

Defense

Jason Johnson – LB

Special teams

Matt Judd – KR

== Schedule ==
Date	Time	Opponent	Site	TV	Result	Attendance
August 28	5:00 p.m.	at Indiana State*	Memorial Stadium; Terre Haute, IN	ESPN+	L 21–26	5,540
September 4	6:00 p.m.	at South Carolina*	Williams–Brice Stadium; Columbia, SC	ESPN+/SECN+	L 0–46	64,868
September 11	12:00 p.m.	at Dayton*	Welcome Stadium; Dayton, OH		L 10–17	2,008
September 18	6:00 p.m.	Illinois State*	O'Brien Field; Charleston, IL	ESPN+	L 24–31	6,424
September 25	1:30 p.m.	at Tennessee Tech	Tucker Stadium; Cookeville, TN	ESPN+	W 28–14	3,125
October 2	4:00 p.m.	at Murray State*	Roy Stewart Stadium; Murray, KY	ESPN+	L 6–22	9,502
October 16	2:00 p.m.	No. 17 UT Martin	O'Brien Field; Charleston, IL	ESPN+	L 17–28	3,189
October 23	2:00 p.m.	Tennessee State^{†}	O'Brien Field; Charleston, IL	ESPN+	L 0–28	6,300
October 30	1:00 p.m.	at Southeast Missouri State	Houck Stadium; Cape Girardeau, MO	ESPN+	L 15–38	3,773
November 6	2:00 p.m.	at Austin Peay	Fortera Stadium; Clarksville, TN	ESPN+	L 26–42	4,088
November 20	12:00 p.m.	Murray State	O'Brien Field; Charleston, IL	ESPN+	L 13–20	1,850
*Non-conference game; ^{†}Homecoming; Rankings from STATS Poll released prior to the game; All times are in Central time

== Game summaries ==
=== at South Carolina ===
Game Two – Eastern Illinois Panthers (0-1) at South Carolina Gamecocks

Quarter	1	2	3	4	Total
Eastern Illinois	0	0	0	0	0
South Carolina	15	14	3	14	46

at Williams-Brice Stadium • Columbia, South Carolina

- Date: Saturday, September 4, 2021
- Game time: 7:00 p.m. EST
- Game weather: Clear • Temperature -
- Game attendance: 64,868
- TV announcers (SECN+): Unknown
- Box Score

Game information

First quarter

- (10:23) SC – Nick Muse 4-yard pass from Zeb Noland (Nick Muse 2PT Run). South Carolina 8-0. Drive: 7 plays, 27 yards, 3:33.
- (3:25) SC – Jaheim Bell 3-yard pass from Zeb Noland (Parker White Kick). South Carolina 15-0. Drive: 10 plays, 43 yards, 5:04.

Second quarter

- (11:49) SC – Josh Vann 12-yard pass from Zeb Noland (Parker White Kick). South Carolina 22-0. Drive: 8 plays, 38 yards, 4:00.
- (0:34) SC – ZaQuandre White 10-yard pass from Zeb Noland (Parker White Kick). South Carolina 29-0. Drive: 6 plays, 52 yards, 0:59.

Third quarter

- (3:10) SC – Parker White 36-yard field goal. South Carolina 32-0. Drive: 15 plays, 66 yards, 6:12.

Fourth quarter

- (10:24) SC – ZaQuandre White 63-yard run (Mitch Jeter Kick). South Carolina 39-0. Drive: 4 plays, 86 yards, 1:51.
- (7:44) SC – Jordan Burch 61-yard interception return (Mitch Jeter Kick). South Carolina 46-0.

Statistics	EIU	SC
First downs	9	22
Plays–yards	44–109	74–439
Rushes–yards	31	254
Passing yards	78	185
Passing: comp–att–int	13–22–2	18–27–0
Time of possession	25:20	34:40

Team	Category	Player	Statistics
EIU	Passing	Chris Katrenick	13/22, 78 yards, 2 INT
EIU	Rushing	Harrison Bey-Bule	5 carries, 12 yards
EIU	Receiving	Tyler Hamilton	5 receptions, 32 yards
SC	Passing	Zeb Noland	13/21, 121 yards, 4 TD
SC	Rushing	ZaQuandre White	12 carries, 128 yards, TD
SC	Receiving	ZaQuandre White	4 receptions, 39 yards, TD
