= 2017 Southeast Missouri State Redhawks football team =

American college football season

2017 Southeast Missouri State Redhawks football
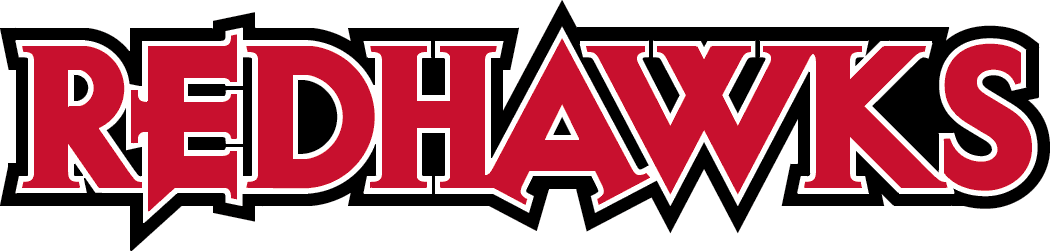
- Conference: Ohio Valley Conference
- Record: 3–8 (3–5 OVC)
- Head coach: Tom Matukewicz (4th season)
- Offensive coordinator: Jon Wiemers (2nd season)
- Defensive coordinator: Bryce Saia (4th season)
- Home stadium: Houck Stadium

2017 Ohio Valley Conference football standings
	Conf.			Overall
Team	W		L	W		L
No. 9 Jacksonville State $^	8	–	0	10	–	2
Austin Peay	7	–	1	8	–	4
Eastern Illinois	5	–	3	6	–	5
UT Martin	4	–	4	6	–	5
Eastern Kentucky	3	–	5	4	–	7
Southeast Missouri State	3	–	5	3	–	8
Tennessee State	2	–	5	6	–	5
Murray State	2	–	5	3	–	8
Tennessee Tech	1	–	7	1	–	10
$ – Conference champion; ^ – FCS playoff participant; Rankings from STATS Poll

The 2017 Southeast Missouri State Redhawks football team represented Southeast Missouri State University as a member of the Ohio Valley Conference (OVC) during the 2017 NCAA Division I FCS football season. Led by fourth-year head coach Tom Matukewicz, the Redhawks compiled an overall record of 3–8 with a mark of 3–5 in conference play, tying for fifth place in the OVC. Southeast Missouri State played home games at Houck Stadium in Cape Girardeau, Missouri.

== Schedule ==
Date	Time	Opponent	Site	TV	Result	Attendance
September 2	6:00 p.m.	at Kansas*	Memorial Stadium; Lawrence, KS	ESPN3	L 16–38	32,134
September 9	Noon	at Dayton*	Welcome Stadium; Dayton, OH	Spectrum Sports, YouTube	L 23–25	2,766
September 16	6:00 p.m.	Southern Illinois*	Houck Stadium; Cape Girardeau, MO	OVCDN	L 17–35	7,025
September 23	6:00 p.m.	at Eastern Illinois	O'Brien Field; Charleston, IL	OVCDN	L 16–19	3,699
September 30	6:00 p.m.	Eastern Kentucky	Houck Stadium; Cape Girardeau, MO	OVCDN	W 29–10	4,375
October 14	1:00 p.m.	Tennessee Tech^{†}	Houck Stadium; Cape Girardeau, MO	OVCDN	W 31–3	4,615
October 21	4:00 p.m.	at Austin Peay	Fortera Stadium; Clarksville, TN	OVCDN	L 31–38	9,428
October 28	3:00 p.m.	at No. 3 Jacksonville State	Burgess–Snow Field at JSU Stadium; Jacksonville, AL	OVCDN	L 7–23	15,692
November 4	1:00 p.m.	UT Martin	Houck Stadium; Cape Girardeau, MO	OVCDN	L 14-16	2,185
November 11	2:00 p.m.	at Tennessee State	Hale Stadium; Nashville, TN	OVCDN	L 20-23	8,693
November 18	1:00 p.m.	Murray State	Houck Stadium; Cape Girardeau, MO	OVCDN	W 21-10	1,120
*Non-conference game; ^{†}Homecoming; Rankings from STATS Poll released prior to the game; All times are in Central time
