= 2017 Austin Peay Governors football team =

American college football season

2017 Austin Peay Governors football
- Conference: Ohio Valley Conference
- Record: 8–4 (7–1 OVC)
- Head coach: Will Healy (2nd season)
- Offensive coordinator: Wesley Satterfield (2nd season)
- Co-defensive coordinators: Marcus West (2nd season); Brandon Cooper (1st season)
- Home stadium: Fortera Stadium

2017 Ohio Valley Conference football standings
	Conf.			Overall
Team	W		L	W		L
No. 9 Jacksonville State $^	8	–	0	10	–	2
Austin Peay	7	–	1	8	–	4
Eastern Illinois	5	–	3	6	–	5
UT Martin	4	–	4	6	–	5
Eastern Kentucky	3	–	5	4	–	7
Southeast Missouri State	3	–	5	3	–	8
Tennessee State	2	–	5	6	–	5
Murray State	2	–	5	3	–	8
Tennessee Tech	1	–	7	1	–	10
$ – Conference champion; ^ – FCS playoff participant; Rankings from STATS Poll

The 2017 Austin Peay Governors football team represented Austin Peay State University during the 2017 NCAA Division I FCS football season. The Governors, led by second-year head coach Will Healy, played their home games at Fortera Stadium and were members of the Ohio Valley Conference. They finished the season 8–4, 7–1 in OVC play to finish in second place.

== Schedule ==
Date	Time	Opponent	Site	TV	Result	Attendance
August 31	6:00 p.m.	at Cincinnati*	Nippert Stadium; Cincinnati, OH	ESPN3	L 14–26	30,831
September 9	2:30 p.m.	at Miami (OH)*	Yager Stadium; Oxford, OH	ESPN3	L 10–31	15,960
September 16	6:00 p.m.	Morehead State*	Fortera Stadium; Clarksville, TN	OVCDN	W 69–13	8,152
September 23	6:00 p.m.	at Murray State	Roy Stewart Stadium; Murray, KY (Battle of the Border)	OVCDN	W 27–7	9,191
September 30	6:00 p.m.	No. 18 UT Martin	Fortera Stadium; Clarksville, TN (Sgt. York Trophy)	OVCDN	W 7–0	8,812
October 7	4:00 p.m.	No. 4 Jacksonville State	Fortera Stadium; Clarksville, TN	OVCDN	L 14–34	7,102
October 14	6:00 p.m.	at Tennessee State	Nissan Stadium; Nashville, TN (Sgt. York Trophy)	OVCDN	W 21–17	21,127
October 21	4:00 p.m.	Southeast Missouri State^{†}	Fortera Stadium; Clarksville, TN	OVCDN	W 38–31	9,428
October 28	5:00 p.m.	at No. 18 (FBS) UCF*	Spectrum Stadium; Orlando, FL	ESPN3	L 33–73	27,606
November 4	1:30 p.m.	at Tennessee Tech	Tucker Stadium; Cookeville, TN (Sgt. York Trophy)	ESPN3	W 35–28	9,416
November 11	12:00 p.m.	at Eastern Kentucky	Roy Kidd Stadium; Richmond, KY	OVCDN	W 31–24	5,100
November 18	4:00 p.m.	Eastern Illinois	Fortera Stadium; Clarksville, TN	OVCDN	W 28–13	8,214
*Non-conference game; ^{†}Homecoming; Rankings from STATS Poll released prior to the game; All times are in Central time

- Source: Schedule

== Game summaries ==
=== At Cincinnati ===
	1	2	3	4	Total
Governors	0	7	0	7	14
Bearcats	0	14	6	6	26

=== At Miami (OH) ===
	1	2	3	4	Total
Governors	7	0	3	0	10
RedHawks	7	14	0	10	31

=== Morehead State ===
	1	2	3	4	Total
Eagles	0	7	0	6	13
Governors	14	28	13	14	69

=== At Murray State ===
	1	2	3	4	Total
Governors	17	3	0	7	27
Racers	0	0	7	0	7

=== UT Martin ===
	1	2	3	4	Total
No. 18 Skyhawks	0	0	0	0	0
Governors	0	7	0	0	7

=== Jacksonville State ===
	1	2	3	4	Total
No. 4 Gamecocks	14	6	7	7	34
Governors	0	7	0	7	14

=== At Tennessee State ===
	1	2	3	4	Total
Governors	7	0	7	7	21
Tigers	3	0	7	7	17

=== Southeast Missouri State ===
	1	2	3	4	Total
Redhawks	7	0	7	17	31
Governors	14	14	7	3	38

=== At UCF ===
	1	2	3	4	Total
Governors	7	19	7	0	33
No. 18 (FBS) Knights	14	31	14	14	73

=== At Tennessee Tech ===
	1	2	3	4	Total
Governors	7	7	14	7	35
Golden Eagles	7	0	7	14	28

=== At Eastern Kentucky ===
	1	2	3	4	Total
Governors	0	7	7	17	31
Colonels	11	10	3	0	24

=== Eastern Illinois ===
	1	2	3	4	Total
Panthers	0	6	0	7	13
Governors	7	7	7	7	28
