= 2020 Tennessee Tech Golden Eagles football team =

American college football season

2020 Tennessee Tech Golden Eagles football
- Conference: Ohio Valley Conference
- Record: 2–5 (2–5 OVC)
- Head coach: Dewayne Alexander (3rd season)
- Offensive coordinator: Doug Malone (1st season)
- Defensive coordinator: Donnie Suber (3rd season)
- Home stadium: Tucker Stadium

2020 Ohio Valley Conference football standings
	Conf.			Overall
Team	W		L	W		L
No. 8 Jacksonville State $^	6	–	1	10	–	3
No. 19 Murray State	5	–	2	5	–	2
No. 21 Austin Peay	4	–	2	4	–	5
Southeast Missouri State	4	–	3	4	–	4
UT Martin	3	–	4	3	–	4
Tennessee Tech	2	–	5	2	–	5
Tennessee State	2	–	5	2	–	5
Eastern Illinois	1	–	5	1	–	5
$ – Conference champion; ^ – FCS playoff participant; Note: Eastern Kentucky played only in the fall and opted out of the spring season.; Rankings from STATS Poll

The 2020 Tennessee Tech Golden Eagles football team represented Tennessee Technological University as a member of Ohio Valley Conference (OVC) during the 2020–21 NCAA Division I FCS football season. Led by third-year head coach Dewayne Alexander, the Golden Eagles compiled an overall record of 2–5 overall with an identical mark in conference play, tying for sixth place in the OVC. Tennessee Tech played home games at Tucker Stadium in Cookeville, Tennessee.

== Schedule ==
Tennessee Tech had games scheduled against Minnesota (September 12) and North Carolina Central (September 19), which were canceled before the start of the 2020 season.

Date	Time	Opponent	Rank	Site	TV	Result	Attendance
February 21	1:30 p.m.	No. 13 Austin Peay		Tucker Stadium; Cookeville, TN (Sgt. York Trophy)	ESPN+	W 27–21	1,825
February 28	3:00 p.m.	at No. 16 Jacksonville State	No. 23	JSU Stadium; Jacksonville, AL	ESPN+	L 10–27	9,355
March 14	1:00 p.m.	Murray State		Tucker Stadium; Cookeville, TN	ESPN+	L 31–36	1,511
March 21	1:00 p.m.	at Eastern Illinois		O'Brien Field; Charleston, IL	ESPN+	L 20–28	1,282
March 28	2:00 p.m.	at Southeast Missouri State		Houck Stadium; Cape Girardeau, MO	ESPN+	L 21–24	1,879
April 3	1:00 p.m.	Tennessee State		Tucker Stadium; Cookeville, TN (Sgt. York Trophy)	ESPN+	W 24–10	1,747
April 11	3:00 p.m.	at UT Martin		Graham Stadium; Martin, TN (Sgt. York Trophy)	ESPN+	L 7–40	1,500
Rankings from STATS Poll released prior to the game; All times are in Central time
