= 2021 UT Martin Skyhawks football team =

American college football season

2021 UT Martin Skyhawks football

OVC champion

NCAA Division I Second Round, L 7–26 vs. Montana State
- Conference: Ohio Valley Conference

Ranking
- STATS: No. 13
- FCS Coaches: No. 12
- Record: 10–3 (5–1 OVC)
- Head coach: Jason Simpson (16th season)
- Offensive coordinator: Kevin Bannon (6th season)
- Defensive coordinator: Chris Polizzi (2nd season)
- Home stadium: Graham Stadium

2021 Ohio Valley Conference football standings
	Conf.			Overall
Team	W		L	W		L
No. 13 UT Martin $^	5	–	1	10	–	3
Southeast Missouri State	4	–	2	4	–	7
Austin Peay	4	–	2	6	–	5
Tennessee State	3	–	3	5	–	6
Murray State	3	–	3	6	–	5
Eastern Illinois	1	–	5	1	–	10
Tennessee Tech	1	–	5	3	–	8
$ – Conference champion; ^ – FCS playoff participant; Rankings from STATS Poll

The 2021 UT Martin Skyhawks football team represented the University of Tennessee at Martin as a member of the Ohio Valley Conference (OVC) during the 2021 NCAA Division I FCS football season. Led by 16th-year head coach Jason Simpson, the Skyhawks compiled an overall record of 10–3 with a mark of 5–1 in conference play, winning the OVC title. UT Martin received an automatic berth to the NCAA Division I Football Championship playoffs, where they beat Missouri State in the first round before losing to the eventual national runner-up, Montana State, in the second round. The team played home games at Graham Stadium in Martin, Tennessee.

== Schedule ==
Date	Time	Opponent	Rank	Site	TV	Result	Attendance
September 2	7:00 p.m.	at Western Kentucky*		Houchens Industries–L. T. Smith Stadium; Bowling Green, KY	ESPN+	L 21–59	16,236
September 11	6:00 p.m.	Samford*		Graham Stadium; Martin, TN	ESPN+	W 33–27	5,869
September 18	6:00 p.m.	at Northwestern State*		Harry Turpin Stadium; Natchitoches, LA	ESPN+	W 35–10	9,146
September 25	3:00 p.m.	at No. 9 Jacksonville State*		Burgess–Snow Field at JSU Stadium; Jacksonville, AL	ESPN+	W 34–31	18,648
October 9	2:00 p.m.	Murray State	No. 21	Graham Stadium; Martin, TN	ESPN+	W 48–24	7,111
October 16	2:00 p.m.	at Eastern Illinois	No. 17	O'Brien Field; Charleston, IL	ESPN3	W 28–17	3,189
October 23	2:00 p.m.	Southeast Missouri State	No. 13	Graham Stadium; Martin, TN	ESPN+	W 38–30	2,230
October 30	2:00 p.m.	Austin Peay	No. 13	Graham Stadium; Martin, TN (Sgt. York Trophy)	ESPN+	W 17–16	2,117
November 6	2:00 p.m.	Tennessee State	No. 15	Graham Stadium; Martin, TN (Sgt. York Trophy)	ESPN3	W 41–20	3,712
November 13	1:30 p.m.	at Tennessee Tech	No. 13	Tucker Stadium; Cookeville, TN (Sgt. York Trophy)	ESPN+	W 42–3	9,604
November 20	1:00 p.m.	at Southeast Missouri State	No. 13	Houck Stadium; Cape Girardeau, MO	ESPN+	L 14–31	3,219
November 27	3:00 p.m.	at No. 12 Missouri State*	No. 16	Robert W. Plaster Stadium; Springfield, MO (NCAA Division I First Round)	ESPN+	W 32–31	5,072
December 4	3:00 p.m.	at No. 7 Montana State*	No. 16	Bobcat Stadium; Bozeman, MT (NCAA Division I Second Round)	ESPN+	L 7–26	15,327
*Non-conference game; Rankings from STATS Poll released prior to the game; All times are in Central time

== Game summaries ==
=== at Western Kentucky ===
Tennessee–Martin at Western Kentucky

Team	1	2	3	4	Total
Skyhawks	7	7	0	7	21
• Hilltoppers	7	21	14	14	56

- Date: September 2, 2021
- Location: Houchens Industries–L. T. Smith Stadium
  Bowling Green, KY
- Game start: 7:05 p.m. CDT
- Elapsed time: 3 hours and 32 minutes
- Game attendance: 16,236
- Game weather: 79 °F (26 °C) • Weather: Clear
- Referee: Kevin Randle
- TV announcers (ESPN+): Graham Doty (play-by-play) and Bob Belvin (analyst)

Scoring summary
1	11:04	UTM	Keon Howard 2-yard rush (Tyler Larco kick) (10 plays, 75 yards, 3:56)	UTM 7–0
1	04:09	WKU	Daewood Davis 73-yard pass from Bailey Zappe (Brayden Narveson kick) (2 plays, 75 yards, 0:41)	TIE 7–7
2	14:56	WKU	Mitchell Tinsley 10-yard pass from Bailey Zappe (Brayden Narveson kick) (6 plays, 55 yards, 2:36)	WKU 14–7
2	09:31	WKU	Jerreth Sterns 22-yard pass from Bailey Zappe (Brayden Narveson kick) (6 plays, 59 yards, 2:40)	WKU 21–7
2	01:43	WKU	Malachi Corley 8-yard pass from Bailey Zappe (Brayden Narveson kick) (12 plays, 79 yards, 4:58)	WKU 28–7
2	00:10	UTM	Colton Dowell 27-yard pass from Keon Howard (Tyler Larco kick) (6 plays, 85 yards, 1:27)	WKU 28–14
3	12:51	WKU	Jerreth Sterns 7-yard pass from Bailey Zappe (Brayden Narveson kick) (5 plays, 53 yards, 2:09)	WKU 35–14
3	11:10	WKU	Joshua Simon 45-yard pass from Bailey Zappe (Brayden Narveson kick) (2 plays, 47 yards, 0:48)	WKU 42–14
3	03:02	WKU	Brayden Narveson 30-yard field goal (12 plays, 68 yards, 5:06)	WKU 45–14
4	14:17	WKU	Joshua Simon 3-yard pass from Bailey Zappe (Brayden Narveson kick) (4 plays, 57 yards, 2:01)	WKU 52–14
4	07:22	UTM	Keon Howard 9-yard rush (Tyler Larco kick) (14 plays, 75 yards, 6:54)	WKU 52–21
4	05:36	WKU	Craig Burt Jr. 54-yard pass from Carson Baker (Brayden Narveson kick) (3 plays, 65 yards, 1:41)	WKU 59–21

Statistics	UT Martin	Western Kentucky
First downs	22	25
Total yards	396	587
Rushing yards	201	109
Passing yards	195	478
Turnovers	2	1
Time of possession	33:30	26:30

Team	Category	Player	Statistics
UT Martin	Passing	Keon Howard	20/43, 195 yards, 1 TD, 1 INT
UT Martin	Rushing	Peyton Logan	7 carries, 75 yards
UT Martin	Receiving	Colton Dowell	6 receptions, 102 yards, 1 TD
Western Kentucky	Passing	Bailey Zappe	28/35, 424 yards, 7 TDs, 1 INT
Western Kentucky	Rushing	Kye Robichaux	9 carries, 44 yards
Western Kentucky	Receiving	Jerreth Sterns	7 receptions, 107 yards, 2 TDs
