= 2020 Austin Peay Governors football team =

American college football season

2020 Austin Peay Governors football
- Conference: Ohio Valley Conference

Ranking
- STATS: No. 21
- Record: 4–5 (4–2 OVC)
- Head coach: Marquase Lovings (interim; first 3 games); Scotty Walden (1st season; final 6 games)
- Offensive coordinator: Scotty Walden (1st season; first 3 games)
- Co-offensive coordinators: Josh Cochran (1st season); Austin Silvoy (1st season)
- Offensive scheme: Spread
- Co-defensive coordinators: Chris Kappas (1st season); Akeem Davis (1st season)
- Base defense: 4–2–5
- Home stadium: Fortera Stadium

2020 Ohio Valley Conference football standings
	Conf.			Overall
Team	W		L	W		L
No. 8 Jacksonville State $^	6	–	1	10	–	3
No. 19 Murray State	5	–	2	5	–	2
No. 21 Austin Peay	4	–	2	4	–	5
Southeast Missouri State	4	–	3	4	–	4
UT Martin	3	–	4	3	–	4
Tennessee Tech	2	–	5	2	–	5
Tennessee State	2	–	5	2	–	5
Eastern Illinois	1	–	5	1	–	5
$ – Conference champion; ^ – FCS playoff participant; Note: Eastern Kentucky played only in the fall and opted out of the spring season.; Rankings from STATS Poll

The 2020 Austin Peay Governors football team represented Austin Peay State University during the 2020–21 NCAA Division I FCS football season. The Governors were led by Scotty Walden and played their home games at Fortera Stadium. They were competing as a member of the Ohio Valley Conference.

== Schedule ==
Due to COVID-19, the OVC made the decision to postpone conference games to Spring 2021, allowing all member schools to play 3 non-conference games in the fall. However, OVC games were moved to Spring 2021.

Date	Time	Opponent	Rank	Site	TV	Result	Attendance	Source
August 29	8:00 p.m.	vs. No. 11 Central Arkansas*	No. 13	Cramton Bowl; Montgomery, AL (FCS Kickoff)	ESPN	L 17–24	2,000	
September 12	3:00 p.m.	at Pittsburgh*	No. 13	Heinz Field; Pittsburgh, PA	ACCN	L 0–55	0	
September 19	11:00 a.m.	at No. 13 (FBS) Cincinnati*	No. 13	Nippert Stadium; Cincinnati, OH	ESPN+	L 20–55	0	
February 21	1:00 p.m.	at Tennessee Tech	No. 13	Tucker Stadium; Cookeville, TN	OVC on ESPN+	L 21–27	1,825	
February 28	2:00 p.m.	Tennessee State		Fortera Stadium; Clarksville, TN	OVC on ESPN+	W 27–20	831	
March 14	2:00 p.m.	at Southeast Missouri State		Houck Stadium; Cape Girardeau, MO	OVC on ESPN+	W 49–42 ^{2OT}	2,201	
March 21	2:00 p.m.	UT Martin		Fortera Stadium; Clarksville, TN	OVC on ESPN+	L 34–37	1,530	
March 28	2:00 p.m.	at No. 7 Jacksonville State		JSU Stadium; Jacksonville, AL	OVC on ESPN+	W 13–10	7,702	
April 3	2:00 p.m.	No. 14 Murray State		Fortera Stadium; Clarksville, TN	OVC on ESPN+	W 34–31	1,843	
April 11	1:00 p.m.	at Eastern Illinois	No. 25	O'Brien Field; Charleston, IL	OVC on ESPN+	Canceled		
*Non-conference game; Rankings from STATS Poll released prior to the game; All times are in Central time

== Game summaries ==
=== Vs. Central Arkansas ===
Game One – No. 13 Austin Peay Governors vs. No. 11 Central Arkansas Bears (Guardian Credit Union FCS Kickoff)

Quarter	1	2	3	4	Total
No. 13 Governors	7	3	0	7	17
No. 11 Bears	0	6	7	11	24

at Crampton Bowl • Montgomery, Alabama

- Date: Saturday, August 29, 2020
- Game time: 8:00 p.m. CDT
- Game weather: Cloudy • Temperature: 81 °F (27 °C) • Wind: NE 3 mph
- Game attendance: 2,000
- Referee: Bob Johnson
- TV announcers (ESPN): Matt Barrie (play-by-play), Mike Golic Jr. (analyst), Lauren Sisler (sideline)
- ESPN NCAA

Game information

First quarter

- (14:44) APSU – CJ Evans Jr. 75 yard rush, Grant Paulette kick (Drive: 1 play, 75 yards, 0:16; Austin Peay 7–0)

Second quarter

- (11:38) APSU – Grant Paulette 28 yard field goal (Drive: 6 plays, 42 yards, 3:09; Austin Peay 10–0)
- (7:37) UCA – Hayden Ray 30 yard field goal (Drive: 12 plays, 63 yards, 4:01; Austin Peay 10–3)
- (3:51) UCA – Hayden Ray 27 yard field goal (Drive: 4 plays, 2 yards, 1:25; Austin Peay 10–6)

Third quarter

- (14:00) UCA – Kierre Crossley 34 yard rush, Hayden Ray kick (Drive: 3 plays, 56 yards, 1:00; Central Arkansas 13–10)

Fourth quarter

- (7:44) UCA – Hayden Ray 32 yard field goal (Drive: 6 plays, 36 yards, 1:13; Central Arkansas 16–10)
- (1:40) APSU – Jeremiah Oatsvall 1 yard rush, Grant Paulette kick (Drive: 7 plays, 60 yards, 2:36; Austin Peay 17–16)
- (0:34) UCA – LuJuan Winningham 10 yard pass from Breylin Smith, 2-point pass good (Drive: 6 plays, 78 yards, 1:06; Central Arkansas 24–17)

Statistics	APSU	UCA
First downs	16	23
Plays–yards	70–333	80–458
Rushes–yards	38–152	31–175
Passing yards	181	283
Passing: comp–att–int	14–33–1	26–49–2
Time of possession	32:06	27:54

Team	Category	Player	Statistics
Austin Peay	Passing	Jeremiah Oatsvall	14/31, 181 yards, 1 INT
Austin Peay	Rushing	CJ Evans Jr.	10 carries, 98 yards, 1 TD
Austin Peay	Receiving	Jay Parker	3 receptions, 55 yards
Central Arkansas	Passing	Breylin Smith	26/49, 283 yards, 1 TD, 2 INT
Central Arkansas	Rushing	Kierre Crossley	12 carries, 110 yards, 1 TD
Central Arkansas	Receiving	Tyler Hudson	5 receptions, 82 yards

=== At Pittsburgh ===
	1	2	3	4	Total
Governors	0	0	0	0	0
Panthers	21	21	0	13	55

=== At Cincinnati ===
	1	2	3	4	Total
Governors	3	0	3	14	20
No. 13 (FBS) Bearcats	14	14	14	13	55
