= Rod Reed =

American football player and coach (born 1966)

Biographical details
- Born: September 15, 1966 (age 60); Marshall, Texas, U.S.

Playing career
- 1985–1988: Tennessee State
- Position: Linebacker

Coaching career (HC unless noted)
- 1991: Prairie View A&M (LB)
- 1992–1995: Bethune-Cookman (LB)
- 1996–1999: Seabreeze HS (FL) (LB)
- 2000–2001: East Texas Baptist (LB)
- 2002: East Texas Baptist (DC)
- 2003–2004: Tennessee State (DC/LB)
- 2005: Tennessee State (OLB)
- 2006–2007: Tennessee State (LB)
- 2008: Tennessee State (DC/LB)
- 2009: Tennessee State (AHC/DC/LB)
- 2010–2020: Tennessee State

Head coaching record
- Overall: 57–60
- Tournaments: 1–1 (NCAA D-I playoffs)

Roderick Reed (born September 15, 1966) is an American college football coach and former player. He was most recently the head football coach at Tennessee State University (TSU).

== Coaching career ==
Born and raised in Marshall, Texas, Reed began his coaching career in 1991 at Prairie View A&M. From 1992 to 1995, he was the linebackers coach at Bethune-Cookman. Reed then moved to the high school ranks as linebackers coach at Seabreeze High School in Daytona Beach, Florida from 1996 until 1999. The next year, he returned to his hometown Marshall, when he was named an assistant coach at East Texas Baptist. After coaching the linebackers for two seasons, Reed was promoted to defensive coordinator prior to the 2002 season. From 2003 to 2004, he served as defensive coordinator and linebackers coach under James Reese at Tennessee State. Following Reese's ousting, Reed was retained by new head coach James Webster in 2005. He coached the Tigers' linebackers for three seasons before returning to the defensive coordinator position in 2008, assuming additional duties as associate head coach in 2009.

Reed's contract was not extended after the 2021 season.

== Personal ==
Reed earned his Bachelor of Science degree in mass communications from Tennessee State in 1988. He and his wife, Tamika, have four children, including Marcel Reed. His father, Bob Reed, also played at TSU during the early 1960s and thereafter for the Washington Redskins of the National Football League (NFL).

== Head coaching record ==
| Year | Team | Overall | Conference | Standing | Bowl/playoffs | Rank^{#} |
|---|---|---|---|---|---|---|
Tennessee State Tigers (Ohio Valley Conference) (2010–2021)
| 2010 | Tennessee State | 3–8 | 0–7 | 9th | | |
| 2011 | Tennessee State | 5–6 | 4–4 | T–5th | | |
| 2012 | Tennessee State | 8–3 | 4–3 | 5th | | |
| 2013 | Tennessee State | 10–4 | 6–2 | 2nd | L FCS Second Round | |
| 2014 | Tennessee State | 6–6 | 3–5 | T–6th | | |
| 2015 | Tennessee State | 4–6 | 1–6 | 8th | | |
| 2016 | Tennessee State | 7–4 | 4–3 | 4th | | |
| 2017 | Tennessee State | 6–5 | 2–5 | T–7th | | |
| 2018 | Tennessee State | 4–5 | 3–5 | 5th | | |
| 2019 | Tennessee State | 2–8 | 1–5 | T–7th | | |
| 2020–21 | Tennessee State | 2–5 | 2–5 | T–6th | | |
| Tennessee State: | | 57–60 | 30–50 | | | |
| Total: | | 57–60 | | | | |
