= Roy Stewart Stadium =

Multi-purpose stadium in Murray, Kentucky

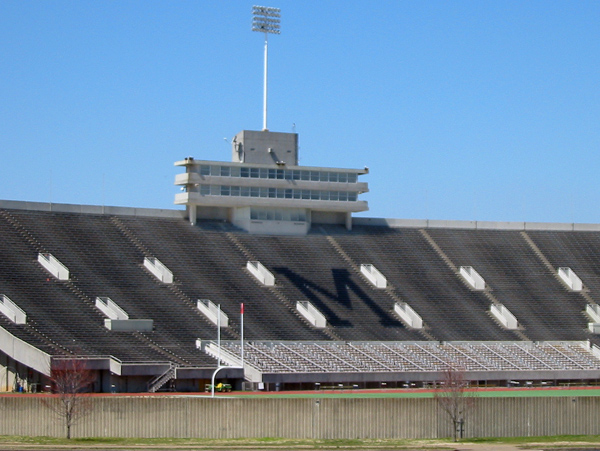
- Interactive map of Roy Stewart Stadium
- Location: 1401 North State Route 121; Murray, Kentucky 42071
- Coordinates: 36.6213°N 88.3177°W
- Owner: Murray State University
- Operator: Murray State University
- Capacity: 16,800
- Surface: AstroTurf (1996–2007); FieldTurf (2007–present)

Construction
- Groundbreaking: 1972
- Opened: September 15, 1973
- Architect: Lee Potter Smith Associates
- Structural engineer: Ted F. Billington Consulting Engineers
- Services engineers: Edward T. Hannan & Associates
- General contractors: Clark/White & Congleton

Tenants
- Murray State Racers (football, rifle, women's track & field)

Roy Stewart Stadium is a 16,800-seat multi-purpose stadium in Murray, Kentucky. It opened in 1973 and is home to the Murray State University Racers football, rifle and women's track and field teams. Before Racers football left the Ohio Valley Conference (OVC) for the Missouri Valley Football Conference (MVFC) in 2023, the stadium was the second-largest of any on-campus stadium in the OVC; it now lies roughly at the MVFC average.

The seven-floor structure is named after Roy Stewart, a longtime Murray State football coach and athletics director. It features a FieldTurf surface surrounded by a nine-lane track. Inside the stadium are athletic offices, locker rooms and meeting rooms for football and track and field, as well as a training room and weight room. The Pat Spurgin Rifle Range, site of seven NCAA championships, is located at the northern end of the second floor.

The Racers' first mascot, a racehorse named Violet Cactus, is buried at the stadium near the area where the current mascot, Racer 1, begins its trek around the football field before the beginning of each football game, and after each Racer touchdown.

== History ==
From 1934 until 1972, Racer football played at Cutchin Football Stadium, which was at the location of the current soccer field. Cutchin Stadium was demolished in 1972 when construction began on a new football stadium to be located on the North end of campus, along US Highway 641. The Racers played their first football game in Roy Stewart Stadium in 1973, and earned a win over Western Carolina University by a score of 27–25. The stadium was officially dedicated on September 9, 1974.

=== Renovations ===
On April 9, 2007, a turf replacement project began to remove the existing turf and install a FieldTurf playing surface at the stadium. The new FieldTurf also allowed for the existing three percent grade on the field to be reduced to 0.5 percent. The rise in the middle of the field was lowered from 18 inches to three inches. The FieldTurf installation was completed in time for the Racers' 2007 home opener on September 15 against Lambuth University. The improvement project also brought about new play clocks, new goal posts, and a new surface on the track.

== Record football crowds ==
All-time largest crowds

1. 16,600, vs. Eastern Kentucky, October 31, 1981 (L 20–24)
2. 16,300, vs. Middle Tennessee State, October 18, 1980 (W 38–6)
3. 16,300, vs. Tennessee Tech, September 26, 1981 (W 15–10)
4. 16,000, vs. Eastern Kentucky, October 27, 1979 (W 24–7)
5. 15,868, vs. Southern Illinois, October 14, 2023 (L 6-27)
6. 15,800, vs. Western Kentucky, November 22, 1980 (W 49–0)
7. 15,711, vs. Eastern Kentucky, November 4, 1995 (W 17–7)
8. 15,500, vs. Youngstown State, September 13, 1980 (W 24–6)
9. 15,200, vs. Eastern Kentucky, October 29, 1977 (W 24–20)
10. 15,200, vs. Western Kentucky, November 23, 1974 (W 9–7)
11. 15,122, vs. Tennessee State, October 29, 2022 (W 19–3)
12. 15,000, vs. Southeast Missouri State, September 6, 1980 (W 19–6)

Largest crowds since 2000

1. 15,868, vs. Southern Illinois, October 14, 2023 (L 6–27)
2. 15,122, vs. Tennessee State, October 29, 2022 (W 19–3)
3. 13,213, vs. Indiana State, September 30, 2023 (W 30–28)
4. 11,921, vs. Morehead State, September 21, 2019 (W 59–7)
5. 11,276, vs. Tennessee Tech, October 28, 2000 (L 21–36)
6. 11,137, vs. UT Martin, September 29, 2018 (W 45–38)
7. 10,897, vs. Jacksonville State, September 27, 2014 (L 28–52)
8. 10,620, vs. Tennessee Tech, September 26, 2015 (L 29–31)
9. 10,132, vs. Missouri State, September 14, 2013 (W 41–38)
10. 10,112 vs. Eastern Illinois, September 24, 2022 (L 21–35)
11. 10,031, vs. Tennessee State, September 17, 2011 (W 58–27)
12. 10,014, vs. Southeast Missouri State, September 24, 2016 (L 16–17)
13. 10,023, vs. Austin Peay, October 23, 2021 (L 6-47)
14. 9,848, vs. #25 Central Arkansas, September 8, 2012 (L 20–42)
15. 9,794, vs. Tennessee Tech, September 29, 2012 (W 70–35)
16. 9,597, vs. UT Martin, October 13, 2012 (L 59–66)
17. 9,502, vs. Eastern Illinois, October 2, 2021 (W 22–6)
18. 9,191, vs. Austin Peay, September 23, 2017 (L 7–27)
19. 9,019, vs. Austin Peay, October 10, 2015 (W 34–18)

== See also ==
- List of NCAA Division I FCS football stadiums
