= List of Ohio Valley Conference football standings =

This is a list of yearly Ohio Valley Conference football standings.

== Ohio Valley standings ==
1948 Ohio Valley Conference football standings
	Conf.					Overall
Team	W		L		T	W		L		T
Murray State +	3	–	1	–	0	9	–	1	–	1
Evansville +	3	–	1	–	0	6	–	3	–	0
Eastern Kentucky	2	–	2	–	0	8	–	3	–	0
Louisville	1	–	1	–	0	5	–	5	–	0
Western Kentucky	2	–	3	–	0	5	–	4	–	0
Morehead State	0	–	3	–	0	3	–	5	–	0
+ – Conference co-champions

1949 Ohio Valley Conference football standings
	Conf.					Overall
Team	W		L		T	W		L		T
Marshall	4	–	0	–	0	6	–	4	–	0
Louisville	3	–	0	–	0	8	–	3	–	0
Evansville $	3	–	1	–	1	8	–	2	–	1
Morehead State	3	–	3	–	0	6	–	3	–	0
Eastern Kentucky	2	–	2	–	1	4	–	4	–	1
Western Kentucky	2	–	3	–	0	5	–	4	–	0
Murray State	1	–	6	–	0	1	–	7	–	1
Tennessee Tech	0	–	3	–	0	3	–	6	–	0
$ – Conference champion; Evansville declared champion because Marshall and Louisville did not play required games in 1949

1950 Ohio Valley Conference football standings
	Conf.					Overall
Team	W		L		T	W		L		T
Murray State $	5	–	0	–	1	7	–	2	–	1
Western Kentucky	3	–	1	–	2	6	–	2	–	2
Eastern Kentucky	4	–	2	–	0	6	–	4	–	0
Morehead State	3	–	3	–	0	4	–	4	–	0
Marshall	2	–	4	–	0	2	–	8	–	0
Evansville	1	–	4	–	1	3	–	6	–	1
Tennessee Tech	1	–	5	–	0	4	–	7	–	0
$ – Conference champion

1951 Ohio Valley Conference football standings
	Conf.					Overall
Team	W		L		T	W		L		T
Murray State $	5	–	1	–	0	8	–	1	–	0
Eastern Kentucky	4	–	2	–	0	7	–	3	–	0
Marshall	4	–	2	–	0	5	–	5	–	1
Evansville	3	–	3	–	0	5	–	5	–	0
Tennessee Tech	3	–	3	–	0	5	–	5	–	1
Western Kentucky	2	–	4	–	0	4	–	5	–	0
Morehead State	0	–	6	–	0	1	–	7	–	0
$ – Conference champion

1952 Ohio Valley Conference football standings
	Conf.					Overall
Team	W		L		T	W		L		T
Western Kentucky +	4	–	1	–	0	9	–	1	–	0
Tennessee Tech +	4	–	1	–	0	9	–	2	–	0
Murray State	3	–	2	–	0	4	–	4	–	0
Middle Tennessee	2	–	2	–	0	6	–	5	–	0
Eastern Kentucky	0	–	3	–	1	3	–	4	–	1
Morehead State	0	–	4	–	1	1	–	6	–	1
$ – Conference champion

1953 Ohio Valley Conference football standings
	Conf.					Overall
Team	W		L		T	W		L		T
Tennessee Tech $	5	–	0	–	0	7	–	4	–	0
Eastern Kentucky	4	–	1	–	0	8	–	2	–	0
Middle Tennessee	3	–	2	–	0	7	–	4	–	0
Western Kentucky	2	–	3	–	0	6	–	4	–	0
Murray State	1	–	4	–	0	3	–	6	–	0
Morehead State	0	–	5	–	0	0	–	8	–	0
$ – Conference champion

1954 Ohio Valley Conference football standings
	Conf.					Overall
Team	W		L		T	W		L		T
Eastern Kentucky $	5	–	0	–	0	8	–	1	–	1
Western Kentucky	3	–	2	–	0	7	–	3	–	0
Murray State	3	–	2	–	0	5	–	4	–	0
Middle Tennessee	2	–	2	–	1	4	–	4	–	2
Tennessee Tech	1	–	3	–	1	4	–	4	–	2
Morehead State	0	–	5	–	0	0	–	9	–	0
$ – Conference champion

1955 Ohio Valley Conference football standings
	Conf.					Overall
Team	W		L		T	W		L		T
Tennessee Tech $	5	–	0	–	0	7	–	3	–	0
Middle Tennessee	4	–	1	–	0	7	–	2	–	1
Eastern Kentucky	3	–	2	–	0	5	–	4	–	1
Murray State	2	–	3	–	0	6	–	4	–	0
Western Kentucky	1	–	4	–	0	3	–	6	–	0
Morehead State	0	–	5	–	0	0	–	9	–	0
$ – Conference champion

1956 Ohio Valley Conference football standings
	Conf.					Overall
Team	W		L		T	W		L		T
Middle Tennessee $	5	–	0	–	0	7	–	2	–	0
Murray State	4	–	1	–	0	6	–	4	–	0
Western Kentucky	2	–	3	–	0	5	–	4	–	0
Tennessee Tech	2	–	3	–	0	5	–	4	–	1
Eastern Kentucky	2	–	3	–	0	4	–	5	–	0
Morehead State	0	–	5	–	0	2	–	6	–	0
$ – Conference champion

1957 Ohio Valley Conference football standings
	Conf.					Overall
Team	W		L		T	W		L		T
Middle Tennessee $	5	–	0	–	0	10	–	0	–	0
Tennessee Tech	4	–	1	–	0	6	–	4	–	0
Eastern Kentucky	3	–	2	–	0	4	–	5	–	0
Western Kentucky	1	–	3	–	1	5	–	3	–	1
Murray State	1	–	3	–	1	3	–	5	–	1
Morehead State	0	–	5	–	0	2	–	7	–	0
$ – Conference champion

1958 Ohio Valley Conference football standings
	Conf.					Overall
Team	W		L		T	W		L		T
No. 11 Middle Tennessee +	5	–	1	–	0	8	–	2	–	0
Tennessee Tech +	5	–	1	–	0	7	–	3	–	0
East Tennessee State	4	–	2	–	0	5	–	4	–	0
Eastern Kentucky	3	–	3	–	0	3	–	6	–	0
Western Kentucky	2	–	4	–	0	4	–	5	–	0
Murray State	2	–	4	–	0	3	–	7	–	0
Morehead State	0	–	6	–	0	0	–	8	–	1
+ – Conference co-champions; Rankings from UPI small college poll

1959 Ohio Valley Conference football standings
	Conf.					Overall
Team	W		L		T	W		L		T
No. 3 Middle Tennessee +	5	–	0	–	1	10	–	0	–	1
Tennessee Tech +	5	–	0	–	1	7	–	2	–	2
East Tennessee State	4	–	2	–	0	7	–	3	–	0
Western Kentucky	3	–	3	–	0	5	–	4	–	0
Eastern Kentucky	2	–	4	–	0	3	–	6	–	0
Morehead State	1	–	5	–	0	3	–	6	–	0
Murray State	0	–	6	–	0	0	–	10	–	0
+ – Conference co-champions; Rankings from UPI small college poll

1960 Ohio Valley Conference football standings
	Conf.					Overall
Team	W		L		T	W		L		T
Tennessee Tech $	6	–	0	–	0	8	–	2	–	0
Middle Tennessee	4	–	2	–	0	5	–	5	–	0
Murray State	4	–	2	–	0	5	–	5	–	0
Morehead State	2	–	4	–	0	5	–	4	–	0
East Tennessee State	1	–	3	–	2	3	–	4	–	2
Eastern Kentucky	1	–	4	–	1	3	–	6	–	1
Western Kentucky	1	–	4	–	1	2	–	6	–	1
$ – Conference champion

1961 Ohio Valley Conference football standings
	Conf.					Overall
Team	W		L		T	W		L		T
Tennessee Tech $	6	–	0	–	0	7	–	3	–	0
Middle Tennessee	5	–	1	–	0	7	–	3	–	0
Western Kentucky	4	–	2	–	0	6	–	3	–	0
Eastern Kentucky	3	–	3	–	0	4	–	5	–	0
Murray State	2	–	4	–	0	4	–	6	–	0
East Tennessee State	1	–	5	–	0	3	–	7	–	0
Morehead State	0	–	6	–	0	1	–	6	–	1
$ – Conference champion

1962 Ohio Valley Conference football standings
	Conf.					Overall
Team	W		L		T	W		L		T
East Tennessee State +	4	–	2	–	0	7	–	3	–	0
Eastern Kentucky +	4	–	2	–	0	6	–	3	–	0
Morehead State +	4	–	2	–	0	5	–	3	–	0
Middle Tennessee +	4	–	2	–	0	6	–	4	–	0
Western Kentucky	3	–	3	–	0	5	–	3	–	0
Murray State	1	–	5	–	0	5	–	5	–	0
Tennessee Tech	1	–	5	–	0	2	–	8	–	0
+ – Conference co-champions

1963 Ohio Valley Conference football standings
	Conf.					Overall
Team	W		L		T	W		L		T
No. 8 Western Kentucky $	7	–	0	–	0	10	–	0	–	1
Middle Tennessee	6	–	1	–	0	8	–	2	–	0
East Tennessee State	5	–	2	–	0	7	–	2	–	0
Tennessee Tech	3	–	4	–	0	6	–	4	–	0
Murray State	3	–	4	–	0	5	–	5	–	0
Morehead State	3	–	4	–	0	5	–	4	–	0
Eastern Kentucky	1	–	6	–	0	2	–	8	–	0
Austin Peay	0	–	7	–	0	1	–	9	–	0
$ – Conference champion; Rankings from UPI small college poll

1964 Ohio Valley Conference football standings
	Conf.					Overall
Team	W		L		T	W		L		T
Middle Tennessee $	6	–	1	–	0	7	–	2	–	1
Austin Peay	5	–	1	–	1	8	–	1	–	1
Western Kentucky	3	–	3	–	1	6	–	3	–	1
Murray State	3	–	3	–	1	5	–	4	–	1
Morehead State	3	–	4	–	0	5	–	4	–	0
East Tennessee State	3	–	4	–	0	5	–	5	–	0
Eastern Kentucky	2	–	4	–	1	3	–	5	–	1
Tennessee Tech	1	–	6	–	0	1	–	9	–	0
$ – Conference champion

1965 Ohio Valley Conference football standings
	Conf.					Overall
Team	W		L		T	W		L		T
Middle Tennessee $	7	–	0	–	0	10	–	0	–	0
Austin Peay	6	–	1	–	0	8	–	1	–	0
Eastern Kentucky	4	–	2	–	1	4	–	4	–	1
Morehead State	3	–	4	–	0	3	–	6	–	0
Tennessee Tech	3	–	4	–	0	3	–	7	–	0
Murray State	1	–	4	–	2	2	–	6	–	2
Western Kentucky	1	–	5	–	1	2	–	6	–	2
East Tennessee State	1	–	6	–	0	2	–	6	–	1
$ – Conference champion

1966 Ohio Valley Conference football standings
	Conf.					Overall
Team	W		L		T	W		L		T
Morehead State $	6	–	1	–	0	7	–	2	–	0
Middle Tennessee	5	–	2	–	0	7	–	3	–	0
Austin Peay	4	–	3	–	0	6	–	4	–	0
No. 16 Eastern Kentucky	4	–	3	–	0	7	–	3	–	0
Tennessee Tech	4	–	3	–	0	5	–	5	–	0
Western Kentucky	3	–	4	–	0	5	–	5	–	0
East Tennessee State	2	–	5	–	0	3	–	6	–	0
Murray State	0	–	7	–	0	0	–	10	–	0
$ – Conference champion; Rankings from UPI small college poll

1967 Ohio Valley Conference football standings
	Conf.					Overall
Team	W		L		T	W		L		T
No. 5/11 Eastern Kentucky $	5	–	0	–	2	7	–	1	–	2
Western Kentucky	5	–	1	–	1	7	–	1	–	1
Middle Tennessee	4	–	3	–	0	5	–	5	–	0
East Tennessee State	3	–	4	–	0	3	–	6	–	1
Tennessee Tech	3	–	4	–	0	3	–	7	–	0
Morehead State	2	–	4	–	1	4	–	5	–	1
Murray State	2	–	5	–	0	4	–	6	–	0
Austin Peay	2	–	5	–	0	2	–	8	–	0
$ – Conference champion; Rankings from AP/UPI small college polls

1968 Ohio Valley Conference football standings
	Conf.					Overall
Team	W		L		T	W		L		T
No. 9/8 Eastern Kentucky $	7	–	0	–	0	8	–	2	–	0
No. 19/17 Western Kentucky	5	–	2	–	0	7	–	2	–	1
Murray State	5	–	2	–	0	7	–	2	–	1
East Tennessee State	4	–	3	–	0	5	–	5	–	0
Austin Peay	3	–	4	–	0	5	–	5	–	0
Tennessee Tech	2	–	5	–	0	2	–	8	–	0
Morehead State	1	–	6	–	0	3	–	6	–	1
Middle Tennessee	1	–	6	–	0	2	–	8	–	0
$ – Conference champion; Rankings from AP/UPI small college polls

1969 Ohio Valley Conference football standings
	Conf.					Overall
Team	W		L		T	W		L		T
No. 20/16 East Tennessee State $	6	–	0	–	1	10	–	0	–	1
Western Kentucky	5	–	2	–	0	6	–	3	–	1
Eastern Kentucky	4	–	3	–	0	6	–	4	–	0
Tennessee Tech	4	–	3	–	0	5	–	5	–	0
Morehead State	3	–	4	–	0	6	–	4	–	0
Murray State	2	–	4	–	1	5	–	4	–	1
Austin Peay	2	–	5	–	0	2	–	7	–	1
Middle Tennessee	1	–	6	–	0	1	–	9	–	0
$ – Conference champion; Rankings from AP/UPI small college polls

1970 Ohio Valley Conference football standings
	Conf.					Overall
Team	W		L		T	W		L		T
No. 12/9 Western Kentucky $	5	–	1	–	1	8	–	1	–	1
Eastern Kentucky	5	–	2	–	0	8	–	2	–	0
East Tennessee State	4	–	1	–	2	7	–	1	–	2
Morehead State	4	–	3	–	0	6	–	4	–	0
Middle Tennessee	3	–	3	–	1	6	–	3	–	1
Austin Peay	2	–	5	–	0	3	–	7	–	0
Tennessee Tech	2	–	5	–	0	4	–	6	–	0
Murray State	1	–	6	–	0	4	–	6	–	0
$ – Conference champion; Rankings from AP/UPI small college polls

1971 Ohio Valley Conference football standings
	Conf.					Overall
Team	W		L		T	W		L		T
No. 6/12 Western Kentucky $	6	–	1	–	0	8	–	2	–	0
Tennessee Tech	5	–	2	–	0	8	–	2	–	0
Middle Tennessee	5	–	2	–	0	7	–	4	–	0
Morehead State	4	–	3	–	0	7	–	3	–	0
Murray State	3	–	3	–	1	5	–	4	–	1
Eastern Kentucky	3	–	4	–	0	5	–	6	–	0
Austin Peay	1	–	6	–	0	2	–	8	–	0
East Tennessee State	0	–	6	–	1	0	–	9	–	1
$ – Conference champion; Rankings from AP/UPI small college polls

1972 Ohio Valley Conference football standings
	Conf.					Overall
Team	W		L		T	W		L		T
No. 8 Tennessee Tech $	7	–	0	–	0	10	–	2	–	0
Western Kentucky	5	–	2	–	0	7	–	3	–	0
Middle Tennessee	4	–	2	–	1	7	–	3	–	1
Morehead State	3	–	3	–	1	3	–	6	–	1
Eastern Kentucky	3	–	4	–	0	5	–	6	–	0
Murray State	2	–	5	–	0	4	–	6	–	0
East Tennessee State	2	–	5	–	0	3	–	7	–	0
Austin Peay	1	–	6	–	0	3	–	8	–	0
$ – Conference champion; Rankings from UPI small college poll

1973 Ohio Valley Conference football standings
	Conf.					Overall
Team	W		L		T	W		L		T
No. 3 Western Kentucky $^	7	–	0	–	0	12	–	1	–	0
Murray State	5	–	2	–	0	7	–	3	–	0
Eastern Kentucky	4	–	3	–	0	7	–	4	–	0
Morehead State	4	–	3	–	0	6	–	5	–	0
East Tennessee State	3	–	4	–	0	4	–	7	–	0
Middle Tennessee	3	–	4	–	0	4	–	7	–	0
Tennessee Tech	1	–	6	–	0	2	–	8	–	1
Austin Peay	1	–	6	–	0	2	–	8	–	0
$ – Conference champion; ^ – NCAA Division II playoff participant; Rankings from AP small college poll

1974 Ohio Valley Conference football standings
	Conf.					Overall
Team	W		L		T	W		L		T
Eastern Kentucky $	6	–	1	–	0	8	–	2	–	0
Murray State	5	–	2	–	0	9	–	2	–	0
Western Kentucky	5	–	2	–	0	7	–	3	–	0
Tennessee Tech	4	–	3	–	0	6	–	5	–	0
East Tennessee State	3	–	3	–	1	4	–	6	–	1
Middle Tennessee	2	–	5	–	0	3	–	8	–	0
Austin Peay	1	–	5	–	1	3	–	7	–	1
Morehead State	1	–	6	–	0	3	–	8	–	0
$ – Conference champion

1975 Ohio Valley Conference football standings
	Conf.					Overall
Team	W		L		T	W		L		T
No. 3 Western Kentucky ^	6	–	1	–	0	9	–	1	–	0
Tennessee Tech $	6	–	1	–	0	8	–	3	–	0
No. 12 Eastern Kentucky	5	–	2	–	0	8	–	2	–	1
Murray State	3	–	3	–	1	4	–	5	–	1
Austin Peay	3	–	4	–	0	3	–	8	–	0
Middle Tennessee	2	–	5	–	0	4	–	7	–	0
East Tennessee State	1	–	5	–	1	2	–	8	–	1
Morehead State	1	–	6	–	0	3	–	7	–	0
$ – Conference champion; ^ – NCAA Division II playoff participant; WKU claims a co-championship, while both the OVC and Tennessee Tech state it is not shared; Rankings from Associated Press poll

1976 Ohio Valley Conference football standings
	Conf.					Overall
Team	W		L		T	W		L		T
No. 5 Eastern Kentucky $^	6	–	1	–	0	8	–	3	–	0
Tennessee Tech	5	–	2	–	0	8	–	3	–	0
Murray State	4	–	3	–	0	5	–	6	–	0
Austin Peay	3	–	4	–	0	5	–	6	–	0
Western Kentucky	3	–	4	–	0	4	–	5	–	1
East Tennessee State	3	–	4	–	0	3	–	7	–	0
Middle Tennessee	2	–	5	–	0	4	–	7	–	0
Morehead State	2	–	5	–	0	2	–	9	–	0
$ – Conference champion; ^ – NCAA Division II playoff participant; Morehead State record adjusted for forfeit to Marshall; Rankings from Associated Press poll

1977 Ohio Valley Conference football standings
	Conf.					Overall
Team	W		L		T	W		L		T
Austin Peay $	6	–	1	–	0	8	–	3	–	0
Tennessee Tech	5	–	2	–	0	9	–	2	–	0
Eastern Kentucky	4	–	3	–	0	5	–	5	–	0
Murray State	4	–	3	–	0	6	–	5	–	0
Middle Tennessee	3	–	4	–	0	3	–	8	–	0
Morehead State	2	–	4	–	1	2	–	6	–	2
East Tennessee State	2	–	5	–	0	3	–	8	–	0
Western Kentucky	1	–	5	–	1	1	–	8	–	1
$ – Conference champion

1978 Ohio Valley Conference football standings
	Conf.					Overall
Team	W		L		T	W		L		T
No. T–4 Western Kentucky $	7	–	0	–	0	8	–	2	–	0
No. 8 Eastern Kentucky	6	–	1	–	0	8	–	2	–	0
Tennessee Tech	4	–	3	–	0	5	–	6	–	0
Austin Peay	4	–	3	–	0	6	–	4	–	0
Murray State	2	–	5	–	0	4	–	7	–	0
Morehead State	2	–	5	–	0	2	–	6	–	1
Middle Tennessee	1	–	6	–	0	1	–	9	–	1
$ – Conference champion; Rankings from Associated Press poll

1979 Ohio Valley Conference football standings
	Conf.					Overall
Team	W		L		T	W		L		T
No. 2 Murray State $^	6	–	0	–	0	9	–	2	–	1
No. 3 Eastern Kentucky ^	5	–	1	–	0	11	–	2	–	0
Morehead State	3	–	2	–	1	5	–	4	–	1
Western Kentucky	3	–	3	–	0	5	–	5	–	0
Austin Peay	2	–	4	–	0	7	–	4	–	0
Middle Tennessee	1	–	5	–	0	1	–	9	–	0
Tennessee Tech	0	–	5	–	1	1	–	8	–	2
$ – Conference champion; ^ – NCAA Division I-AA playoff participant; Rankings from Associated Press poll

1980 Ohio Valley Conference football standings
	Conf.					Overall
Team	W		L		T	W		L		T
No. 5 Western Kentucky $	6	–	1	–	0	9	–	1	–	0
No. T–10 Murray State	5	–	2	–	0	9	–	2	–	0
No. T–3 Eastern Kentucky ^	5	–	2	–	0	10	–	3	–	0
Austin Peay	5	–	2	–	0	7	–	4	–	0
Akron	2	–	4	–	1	3	–	7	–	1
Morehead State	2	–	5	–	0	4	–	7	–	0
Middle Tennessee	2	–	5	–	0	2	–	8	–	0
Tennessee Tech	1	–	6	–	0	4	–	7	–	0
$ – Conference champion; ^ – NCAA Division I-AA playoff participant; Rankings from Associated Press poll

1981 Ohio Valley Conference football standings
	Conf.					Overall
Team	W		L		T	W		L		T
No. 1 Eastern Kentucky $^	8	–	0	–	0	12	–	2	–	0
No. 9 Murray State	5	–	3	–	0	8	–	3	–	0
Youngstown State	5	–	3	–	0	7	–	4	–	0
Tennessee Tech	4	–	4	–	0	6	–	5	–	0
Middle Tennessee	4	–	4	–	0	6	–	5	–	0
Western Kentucky	4	–	4	–	0	6	–	5	–	0
Akron	4	–	4	–	0	5	–	5	–	0
Austin Peay	3	–	5	–	0	5	–	5	–	0
Morehead State	0	–	8	–	0	1	–	9	–	0
$ – Conference champion; ^ – NCAA Division I-AA playoff participant; Rankings from NCAA Division I-AA Football Committee poll

1982 Ohio Valley Conference football standings
	Conf.					Overall
Team	W		L		T	W		L		T
No. 1 Eastern Kentucky $^	7	–	0	–	0	13	–	0	–	0
Akron	5	–	2	–	0	6	–	5	–	0
Middle Tennessee	4	–	3	–	0	8	–	3	–	0
Youngstown State	4	–	3	–	0	6	–	5	–	0
Morehead State	2	–	5	–	0	5	–	6	–	0
Murray State	2	–	5	–	0	4	–	7	–	0
Austin Peay	2	–	5	–	0	3	–	7	–	0
Tennessee Tech	1	–	6	–	0	3	–	8	–	0
$ – Conference champion; ^ – NCAA Division I-AA playoff participant; Rankings from NCAA Division I-AA Football Committee poll

1983 Ohio Valley Conference football standings
	Conf.					Overall
Team	W		L		T	W		L		T
No. 8 Eastern Kentucky $^	6	–	1	–	0	7	–	2	–	1
No. 16 Middle Tennessee	5	–	2	–	0	8	–	2	–	0
Akron	5	–	2	–	0	8	–	3	–	0
Murray State	4	–	3	–	0	7	–	4	–	0
Austin Peay	3	–	4	–	0	6	–	5	–	0
Youngstown State	2	–	5	–	0	4	–	7	–	0
Tennessee Tech	2	–	5	–	0	2	–	8	–	0
Morehead State	1	–	6	–	0	2	–	9	–	0
$ – Conference champion; ^ – NCAA Division I-AA playoff participant; Rankings from NCAA Division I-AA Football Committee poll

1984 Ohio Valley Conference football standings
	Conf.					Overall
Team	W		L		T	W		L		T
No. 8 Eastern Kentucky $^	6	–	1	–	0	8	–	4	–	0
No. 7 Middle Tennessee ^	5	–	2	–	0	11	–	3	–	0
No. 13 Murray State	5	–	2	–	0	9	–	2	–	0
Youngstown State	5	–	2	–	0	7	–	4	–	0
Austin Peay	4	–	3	–	0	7	–	4	–	0
Akron	2	–	5	–	0	4	–	7	–	0
Morehead State	1	–	6	–	0	2	–	9	–	0
Tennessee Tech	0	–	7	–	0	0	–	11	–	0
$ – Conference champion; ^ – NCAA Division I-AA playoff participant; Rankings from NCAA Division I-AA Football Committee poll

1985 Ohio Valley Conference football standings
	Conf.					Overall
Team	W		L		T	W		L		T
No. 1 Middle Tennessee $^	7	–	0	–	0	11	–	1	–	0
No. 10 Akron ^	5	–	2	–	0	8	–	4	–	0
No. 17 Murray State	5	–	2	–	0	7	–	3	–	1
No. 19 Eastern Kentucky	5	–	2	–	0	8	–	3	–	0
Youngstown State	4	–	3	–	0	5	–	6	–	0
Austin Peay	2	–	5	–	0	5	–	6	–	0
Tennessee Tech	1	–	6	–	0	1	–	10	–	0
Morehead State	0	–	7	–	0	1	–	10	–	0
$ – Conference champion; ^ – NCAA Division I-AA playoff participant; Rankings from NCAA Division I-AA Football Committee poll

1986 Ohio Valley Conference football standings
	Conf.					Overall
Team	W		L		T	W		L		T
No. 10 Eastern Kentucky ^	6	–	1	–	0	10	–	3	–	1
No. 18 Murray State $^	6	–	1	–	0	7	–	4	–	1
Akron	4	–	3	–	0	7	–	4	–	0
Middle Tennessee	4	–	3	–	0	6	–	5	–	0
Morehead State	3	–	4	–	0	7	–	4	–	0
Austin Peay	3	–	4	–	0	5	–	6	–	0
Youngstown State	2	–	5	–	0	2	–	9	–	0
Tennessee Tech	0	–	7	–	0	0	–	10	–	0
$ – Conference champion; ^ – NCAA Division I-AA playoff participant; Rankings from NCAA Division I-AA Football Committee poll

1987 Ohio Valley Conference football standings
	Conf.					Overall
Team	W		L		T	W		L		T
No. 7 Eastern Kentucky +^	5	–	1	–	0	9	–	3	–	0
No. 15 Youngstown State +^	5	–	1	–	0	8	–	4	–	0
Middle Tennessee	4	–	2	–	0	6	–	5	–	0
Murray State	3	–	3	–	0	6	–	5	–	0
Tennessee Tech	2	–	4	–	0	5	–	6	–	0
Morehead State	1	–	5	–	0	2	–	8	–	0
Austin Peay	1	–	5	–	0	2	–	9	–	0
+ – Conference co-champions; ^ – NCAA Division I-AA playoff participant; Rankings from NCAA Division I-AA Football Committee poll

1988 Ohio Valley Conference football standings
	Conf.					Overall
Team	W		L		T	W		L		T
No. 7 Eastern Kentucky $^	6	–	0	–	0	11	–	3	–	0
No. 17 Middle Tennessee	4	–	2	–	0	7	–	4	–	0
Murray State	4	–	2	–	0	4	–	6	–	0
Tennessee State	2	–	4	–	0	3	–	7	–	1
Austin Peay	2	–	4	–	0	3	–	8	–	0
Morehead State	2	–	4	–	0	3	–	8	–	0
Tennessee Tech	1	–	5	–	0	1	–	10	–	0
$ – Conference champion; ^ – NCAA Division I-AA playoff participant; Rankings from NCAA Division I-AA Football Committee poll

1989 Ohio Valley Conference football standings
	Conf.					Overall
Team	W		L		T	W		L		T
No. T–10 Middle Tennessee $^	6	–	0	–	0	9	–	4	–	0
No. 12 Eastern Kentucky ^	5	–	1	–	0	9	–	3	–	0
Murray State	3	–	3	–	0	6	–	4	–	1
Tennessee State	3	–	3	–	0	5	–	5	–	1
Tennessee Tech	3	–	3	–	0	5	–	5	–	0
Austin Peay	1	–	5	–	0	1	–	10	–	0
Morehead State	0	–	6	–	0	1	–	10	–	0
$ – Conference champion; ^ – NCAA Division I-AA playoff participant; Records adjusted for Morehead State forfeit of conference victories over Austin Peay and Tennessee Tech, and non-conference victories over Kentucky State and Samford; Rankings from NCAA Division I-AA Football Committee poll

1990 Ohio Valley Conference football standings
	Conf.					Overall
Team	W		L		T	W		L		T
No. 1 Middle Tennessee +^	5	–	1	–	0	11	–	2	–	0
No. 5 Eastern Kentucky +^	5	–	1	–	0	10	–	2	–	0
Tennessee State	4	–	2	–	0	7	–	4	–	0
Tennessee Tech	3	–	3	–	0	6	–	5	–	0
Morehead State	3	–	3	–	0	5	–	6	–	0
Murray State	1	–	5	–	0	2	–	9	–	0
Austin Peay	0	–	6	–	0	0	–	11	–	0
+ – Conference co-champions; ^ – NCAA Division I-AA playoff participant; Rankings from NCAA Division I-AA Football Committee poll

1991 Ohio Valley Conference football standings
	Conf.					Overall
Team	W		L		T	W		L		T
No. 2 Eastern Kentucky $^	7	–	0	–	0	12	–	2	–	0
No. 9 Middle Tennessee ^	6	–	1	–	0	9	–	4	–	0
Austin Peay	3	–	4	–	0	5	–	6	–	0
Morehead State	3	–	4	–	0	4	–	7	–	0
Southeast Missouri State	3	–	4	–	0	3	–	8	–	0
Tennessee State	2	–	5	–	0	3	–	8	–	0
Tennessee Tech	2	–	5	–	0	2	–	9	–	0
Murray State	1	–	6	–	0	3	–	8	–	0
$ – Conference champion; ^ – NCAA Division I-AA playoff participant; Rankings from NCAA Division I-AA Football Committee poll

1992 Ohio Valley Conference football standings
	Conf.					Overall
Team	W		L		T	W		L		T
No. 4 Middle Tennessee $^	8	–	0	–	0	10	–	3	–	0
No. 12 Eastern Kentucky ^	7	–	1	–	0	9	–	3	–	0
Tennessee Tech	6	–	2	–	0	7	–	4	–	0
Tennessee State	5	–	3	–	0	5	–	6	–	0
Morehead State	3	–	5	–	0	3	–	8	–	0
Austin Peay	2	–	6	–	0	3	–	8	–	0
Tennessee–Martin	2	–	6	–	0	3	–	8	–	0
Southeast Missouri State	2	–	6	–	0	2	–	9	–	0
Murray State	1	–	7	–	0	2	–	9	–	0
$ – Conference champion; ^ – NCAA Division I-AA playoff participant; Rankings from NCAA Division I-AA Football Committee poll

1993 Ohio Valley Conference football standings
	Conf.					Overall
Team	W		L		T	W		L		T
No. 17 Eastern Kentucky $^	8	–	0	–	0	8	–	4	–	0
No. 22 Tennessee Tech	7	–	1	–	0	8	–	3	–	0
Tennessee–Martin	5	–	3	–	0	6	–	5	–	0
Middle Tennessee	4	–	4	–	0	5	–	6	–	0
Murray State	4	–	4	–	0	4	–	7	–	0
Tennessee State	4	–	4	–	0	4	–	7	–	0
Morehead State	2	–	6	–	0	3	–	8	–	0
Southeast Missouri State	2	–	6	–	0	3	–	8	–	0
Austin Peay	0	–	8	–	0	1	–	10	–	0
$ – Conference champion; ^ – NCAA Division I-AA playoff participant; Rankings from The Sports Network poll

1994 Ohio Valley Conference football standings
	Conf.					Overall
Team	W		L		T	W		L		T
No. 4 Eastern Kentucky $^	8	–	0	–	0	8	–	4	–	0
No. 16 Middle Tennessee ^	7	–	1	–	0	8	–	3	–	1
Southeast Missouri State	5	–	3	–	0	7	–	5	–	0
Tennessee State	4	–	4	–	0	5	–	6	–	0
Murray State	4	–	4	–	0	5	–	6	–	0
Tennessee Tech	3	–	5	–	0	5	–	6	–	0
Austin Peay	3	–	5	–	0	4	–	7	–	0
Tennessee–Martin	2	–	6	–	0	5	–	6	–	0
Morehead State	0	–	8	–	0	0	–	11	–	0
$ – Conference champion; ^ – NCAA Division I-AA playoff participant; Rankings from The Sports Network poll

1995 Ohio Valley Conference football standings
	Conf.					Overall
Team	W		L		T	W		L		T
No. 4 Murray State $^	8	–	0	–	0	11	–	1	–	0
No. 10 Eastern Kentucky ^	7	–	1	–	0	9	–	3	–	0
No. 25 Middle Tennessee	6	–	2	–	0	7	–	4	–	0
Southeast Missouri State	5	–	3	–	0	5	–	6	–	0
Tennessee–Martin	4	–	4	–	0	5	–	6	–	0
Austin Peay	2	–	6	–	0	3	–	8	–	0
Tennessee Tech	2	–	6	–	0	3	–	8	–	0
Morehead State	1	–	7	–	0	2	–	8	–	0
Tennessee State	1	–	7	–	0	2	–	9	–	0
$ – Conference champion; ^ – NCAA Division I-AA playoff participant; Rankings from The Sports Network poll

1996 Ohio Valley Conference football standings
	Conf.			Overall
Team	W		L	W		L
No. 4 Murray State $^	8	–	0	11	–	2
No. 16 Eastern Illinois ^	6	–	2	8	–	4
Eastern Kentucky	6	–	2	6	–	5
Middle Tennessee	4	–	4	6	–	5
Tennessee Tech	4	–	4	5	–	6
Tennessee State	3	–	5	4	–	7
Southeast Missouri State	3	–	5	3	–	8
Austin Peay	1	–	7	1	–	10
Tennessee–Martin	1	–	7	1	–	10
$ – Conference champion; ^ – NCAA Division I-AA playoff participant; Rankings from The Sports Network poll

1997 Ohio Valley Conference football standings
	Conf.			Overall
Team	W		L	W		L
No. 19 Eastern Kentucky $^	7	–	0	8	–	4
No. 16 Eastern Illinois	5	–	2	8	–	3
Murray State	5	–	2	7	–	4
Tennessee Tech	4	–	3	6	–	5
Tennessee State	4	–	3	4	–	7
Middle Tennessee	2	–	5	4	–	6
Southeast Missouri State	1	–	6	4	–	7
Tennessee–Martin	0	–	7	1	–	10
$ – Conference champion; ^ – NCAA Division I-AA playoff participant; Rankings from The Sports Network poll

1998 Ohio Valley Conference football standings
	Conf.			Overall
Team	W		L	W		L
No. 12 Tennessee State $^	6	–	1	9	–	3
No. 24 Murray State	5	–	2	7	–	4
Middle Tennessee	5	–	2	5	–	5
Eastern Illinois	4	–	3	6	–	5
Eastern Kentucky	4	–	3	6	–	5
Tennessee Tech	2	–	5	4	–	7
Southeast Missouri State	2	–	5	3	–	8
Tennessee–Martin	0	–	7	0	–	11
$ – Conference champion; ^ – NCAA Division I-AA playoff participant; Rankings from The Sports Network poll

1999 Ohio Valley Conference football standings
	Conf.			Overall
Team	W		L	W		L
No. 11 Tennessee State $^	7	–	0	11	–	1
Murray State	5	–	2	7	–	4
Eastern Kentucky	4	–	3	7	–	4
Western Kentucky	4	–	3	6	–	5
Tennessee Tech	4	–	3	5	–	5
Southeast Missouri State	2	–	5	3	–	8
Eastern Illinois	2	–	5	2	–	10
Tennessee–Martin	0	–	7	1	–	10
$ – Conference champion; ^ – NCAA Division I-AA playoff participant; Rankings from The Sports Network poll

2000 Ohio Valley Conference football standings
	Conf.			Overall
Team	W		L	W		L
No. 5 Western Kentucky $^	7	–	0	11	–	2
No. 17 Eastern Illinois ^	6	–	1	8	–	4
No. 22 Tennessee Tech	5	–	2	8	–	3
Murray State	4	–	3	6	–	5
Eastern Kentucky	3	–	4	6	–	5
Tennessee State	2	–	5	3	–	8
Southeast Missouri State	1	–	6	3	–	8
Tennessee–Martin	0	–	7	2	–	9
$ – Conference champion; ^ – NCAA Division I-AA playoff participant; Rankings from The Sports Network poll

2001 Ohio Valley Conference football standings
	Conf.			Overall
Team	W		L	W		L
No. 9 Eastern Illinois $^	6	–	0	9	–	1
No. 18 Eastern Kentucky	5	–	1	8	–	2
No. 23 Tennessee Tech	4	–	2	7	–	3
No. 25 Tennessee State	3	–	3	8	–	3
Murray State	2	–	4	4	–	6
Southeast Missouri State	1	–	5	4	–	7
Tennessee–Martin	0	–	6	1	–	10
$ – Conference champion; ^ – NCAA Division I-AA playoff participant; Rankings from The Sports Network poll

2002 Ohio Valley Conference football standings
	Conf.			Overall
Team	W		L	W		L
No. 13 Eastern Illinois +^	5	–	1	8	–	4
No. 20 Murray State +^	5	–	1	7	–	5
No. 21 Eastern Kentucky	4	–	2	8	–	4
No. 24 Southeast Missouri State	4	–	2	8	–	4
Tennessee Tech	2	–	4	5	–	7
Tennessee State	1	–	5	2	–	10
Tennessee–Martin	0	–	6	2	–	10
+ – Conference co-champions; ^ – NCAA Division I-AA playoff participant; Rankings from The Sports Network poll

2003 Ohio Valley Conference football standings
	Conf.			Overall
Team	W		L	W		L
No. 18 Jacksonville State $^	7	–	1	8	–	4
Eastern Kentucky	6	–	2	7	–	5
Samford	5	–	3	7	–	4
Tennessee State	5	–	3	7	–	5
Southeast Missouri State	5	–	3	5	–	7
Murray State	3	–	5	4	–	8
Eastern Illinois	3	–	5	4	–	8
Tennessee Tech	1	–	7	2	–	9
Tennessee–Martin	1	–	7	2	–	10
$ – Conference champion; ^ – NCAA Division I-AA playoff participant; Rankings from The Sports Network poll

2004 Ohio Valley Conference football standings
	Conf.			Overall
Team	W		L	W		L
No. 14 Jacksonville State $^	7	–	1	9	–	2
Murray State	6	–	2	7	–	4
Eastern Kentucky	6	–	2	6	–	5
Eastern Illinois	4	–	4	5	–	6
Tennessee Tech	3	–	4	6	–	5
Samford	3	–	5	4	–	7
Southeast Missouri State	3	–	5	3	–	8
Tennessee State	2	–	5	4	–	7
Tennessee–Martin	1	–	7	2	–	9
$ – Conference champion; ^ – NCAA Division I-AA playoff participant; Rankings from The Sports Network poll

2005 Ohio Valley Conference football standings
	Conf.			Overall
Team	W		L	W		L
No. 16 Eastern Illinois $^	8	–	0	9	–	3
Eastern Kentucky	7	–	1	7	–	4
Jacksonville State	6	–	2	6	–	5
Tennessee–Martin	4	–	4	6	–	5
Samford	4	–	4	5	–	6
Tennessee Tech	3	–	5	4	–	7
Southeast Missouri State	2	–	6	2	–	9
Tennessee State	1	–	6	2	–	9
Murray State	0	–	7	2	–	9
$ – Conference champion; ^ – NCAA Division I-AA playoff participant; Rankings from The Sports Network poll

2006 Ohio Valley Conference football standings
	Conf.			Overall
Team	W		L	W		L
No. 15 Eastern Illinois +^	7	–	1	8	–	5
No. 13 Tennessee–Martin +^	6	–	1	9	–	3
Tennessee State	5	–	2	6	–	5
Jacksonville State	5	–	3	6	–	5
Eastern Kentucky	5	–	3	6	–	5
Tennessee Tech	4	–	4	4	–	7
Southeast Missouri State	2	–	6	4	–	7
Samford	1	–	7	3	–	8
Murray State	0	–	8	1	–	10
+ – Conference co-champions; ^ – FCS playoff participant; Rankings from The Sports Network poll

2007 Ohio Valley Conference football standings
	Conf.			Overall
Team	W		L	W		L
No. 13 Eastern Kentucky $^	8	–	0	9	–	3
No. 18 Eastern Illinois ^	7	–	1	8	–	4
Austin Peay	5	–	3	7	–	4
Jacksonville State	5	–	3	6	–	5
Tennessee State	4	–	3	5	–	6
Tennessee–Martin	4	–	4	4	–	7
Samford	2	–	6	4	–	7
Tennessee Tech	2	–	6	4	–	7
Southeast Missouri State	1	–	6	3	–	8
Murray State	1	–	7	2	–	9
$ – Conference champion; ^ – FCS playoff participant; Rankings from The Sports Network poll

2008 Ohio Valley Conference football standings
	Conf.			Overall
Team	W		L	W		L
No. 19 Eastern Kentucky $^	7	–	1	8	–	4
Jacksonville State	6	–	2	8	–	3
Tennessee–Martin	6	–	2	8	–	4
Tennessee State	5	–	3	8	–	4
Murray State	4	–	4	5	–	7
Eastern Illinois	3	–	5	5	–	7
Southeast Missouri State	2	–	6	4	–	8
Austin Peay	2	–	6	2	–	9
Tennessee Tech	1	–	7	3	–	9
$ – Conference champion; ^ – FCS playoff participant; Rankings from The Sports Network poll

2009 Ohio Valley Conference football standings
	Conf.			Overall
Team	W		L	W		L
No. 16 Jacksonville State	6	–	1	8	–	3
No. 19 Eastern Illinois $^	6	–	2	8	–	4
Tennessee Tech	5	–	3	6	–	5
Eastern Kentucky	5	–	3	5	–	6
UT Martin	4	–	4	5	–	6
Tennessee State	3	–	4	4	–	7
Austin Peay	3	–	5	4	–	7
Murray State	2	–	6	3	–	8
Southeast Missouri State	1	–	7	2	–	9
$ – Conference champion; ^ – FCS playoff participant; Jacksonville State had the best record in conference play, but was not eligible for the FCS playoffs because of APR violations.; Rankings from The Sports Network poll

2010 Ohio Valley Conference football standings
	Conf.			Overall
Team	W		L	W		L
No. 13 Southeast Missouri State $^	7	–	1	9	–	3
No. 12 Jacksonville State ^	6	–	2	9	–	3
Eastern Kentucky	5	–	2	6	–	5
Murray State	5	–	3	6	–	5
UT Martin	5	–	3	6	–	5
Tennessee Tech	4	–	4	5	–	6
Eastern Illinois	2	–	6	2	–	9
Austin Peay	1	–	7	2	–	9
Tennessee State	0	–	7	3	–	8
$ – Conference champion; ^ – FCS playoff participant; Rankings from The Sports Network poll

2011 Ohio Valley Conference football standings
	Conf.			Overall
Team	W		L	W		L
No. 21 Tennessee Tech +^	6	–	2	7	–	4
Eastern Kentucky +^	6	–	2	7	–	5
Jacksonville State +	6	–	2	7	–	4
Murray State	5	–	3	7	–	4
Tennessee State	4	–	4	5	–	6
UT Martin	4	–	4	5	–	6
Austin Peay	2	–	6	3	–	8
Southeast Missouri State	2	–	6	3	–	8
Eastern Illinois	1	–	7	2	–	9
+ – Conference co-champions; ^ – FCS playoff participant; Rankings from The Sports Network poll

2012 Ohio Valley Conference football standings
	Conf.			Overall
Team	W		L	W		L
Eastern Illinois $^	6	–	1	7	–	5
No. 22 Eastern Kentucky	6	–	2	8	–	3
UT Martin	6	–	2	8	–	3
Jacksonville State	5	–	3	6	–	5
Tennessee State	4	–	3	8	–	3
Murray State	4	–	4	5	–	6
Southeast Missouri State	2	–	6	3	–	8
Tennessee Tech	1	–	7	3	–	8
Austin Peay	1	–	7	2	–	9
$ – Conference champion; ^ – FCS playoff participant; Rankings from The Sports Network poll

2013 Ohio Valley Conference football standings
	Conf.			Overall
Team	W		L	W		L
No. 4 Eastern Illinois $^	8	–	0	12	–	2
No. 17 Tennessee State ^	6	–	2	10	–	4
No. 10 Jacksonville State ^	5	–	3	11	–	4
UT Martin	5	–	3	7	–	5
Eastern Kentucky	4	–	4	6	–	6
Murray State	4	–	4	6	–	6
Tennessee Tech	2	–	6	5	–	7
Southeast Missouri State	2	–	6	3	–	9
Austin Peay	0	–	8	0	–	12
$ – Conference champion; ^ – FCS playoff participant; Rankings from The Sports Network poll

2014 Ohio Valley Conference football standings
	Conf.			Overall
Team	W		L	W		L
No. 9 Jacksonville State $^	8	–	0	10	–	2
No. 21 Eastern Kentucky ^	6	–	2	9	–	4
UT Martin	5	–	3	6	–	6
Eastern Illinois	5	–	3	5	–	7
Tennessee Tech	4	–	4	5	–	7
Tennessee State	3	–	5	6	–	6
SE Missouri State	3	–	5	5	–	7
Murray State	1	–	7	3	–	9
Austin Peay	1	–	7	1	–	11
$ – Conference champion; ^ – FCS playoff participant; Rankings from The Sports Network poll

2015 Ohio Valley Conference football standings
	Conf.			Overall
Team	W		L	W		L
No. 2 Jacksonville State $^	8	–	0	13	–	2
No. 25 Eastern Illinois ^	7	–	1	7	–	5
UT Martin	6	–	2	7	–	4
Eastern Kentucky	5	–	3	6	–	5
SE Missouri State	3	–	4	4	–	7
Tennessee Tech	3	–	5	4	–	7
Murray State	2	–	6	3	–	8
Tennessee State	1	–	6	4	–	6
Austin Peay	0	–	8	0	–	11
$ – Conference champion; ^ – FCS playoff participant; Rankings from STATS Poll

2016 Ohio Valley Conference football standings
	Conf.			Overall
Team	W		L	W		L
No. 6 Jacksonville State $^	7	–	0	10	–	2
UT Martin	6	–	2	7	–	5
Tennessee Tech	5	–	3	5	–	6
Tennessee State	4	–	3	7	–	4
Eastern Illinois	4	–	4	6	–	5
Murray State	4	–	4	4	–	7
SE Missouri State	3	–	5	3	–	8
Eastern Kentucky	2	–	6	3	–	8
Austin Peay	0	–	8	0	–	11
$ – Conference champion; ^ – FCS playoff participant; Rankings from STATS Poll

2017 Ohio Valley Conference football standings
	Conf.			Overall
Team	W		L	W		L
No. 9 Jacksonville State $^	8	–	0	10	–	2
Austin Peay	7	–	1	8	–	4
Eastern Illinois	5	–	3	6	–	5
UT Martin	4	–	4	6	–	5
Eastern Kentucky	3	–	5	4	–	7
Southeast Missouri State	3	–	5	3	–	8
Tennessee State	2	–	5	6	–	5
Murray State	2	–	5	3	–	8
Tennessee Tech	1	–	7	1	–	10
$ – Conference champion; ^ – FCS playoff participant; Rankings from STATS Poll

2018 Ohio Valley Conference football standings
	Conf.			Overall
Team	W		L	W		L
No. 10 Jacksonville State $^	7	–	1	8	–	3
No. 15 Southeast Missouri State ^	6	–	2	8	–	3
Eastern Kentucky	5	–	2	7	–	4
Murray State	5	–	3	5	–	6
Tennessee State	3	–	4	4	–	5
Eastern Illinois	3	–	5	3	–	8
Austin Peay	3	–	5	5	–	6
UT Martin	2	–	6	2	–	9
Tennessee Tech	1	–	7	1	–	10
$ – Conference champion; ^ – FCS playoff participant; Rankings from STATS Poll

2019 Ohio Valley Conference football standings
	Conf.			Overall
Team	W		L	W		L
No. 8 Austin Peay +^	7	–	1	9	–	3
No. 17 Southeast Missouri State +^	7	–	1	9	–	3
UT Martin	6	–	2	7	–	5
Eastern Kentucky	5	–	3	7	–	5
Tennessee Tech	3	–	5	6	–	6
Jacksonville State	3	–	5	6	–	6
Murray State	2	–	6	4	–	8
Tennessee State	2	–	6	3	–	9
Eastern Illinois	1	–	7	1	–	11
+ – Conference co-champions; ^ – FCS playoff participant; Rankings from STATS Poll

2020 Ohio Valley Conference football standings
	Conf.			Overall
Team	W		L	W		L
No. 8 Jacksonville State $^	6	–	1	10	–	3
No. 19 Murray State	5	–	2	5	–	2
No. 21 Austin Peay	4	–	2	4	–	5
Southeast Missouri State	4	–	3	4	–	4
UT Martin	3	–	4	3	–	4
Tennessee Tech	2	–	5	2	–	5
Tennessee State	2	–	5	2	–	5
Eastern Illinois	1	–	5	1	–	5
$ – Conference champion; ^ – FCS playoff participant; Note: Eastern Kentucky played only in the fall and opted out of the spring season.; Rankings from STATS Poll

2021 Ohio Valley Conference football standings
	Conf.			Overall
Team	W		L	W		L
No. 13 UT Martin $^	5	–	1	10	–	3
Southeast Missouri State	4	–	2	4	–	7
Austin Peay	4	–	2	6	–	5
Tennessee State	3	–	3	5	–	6
Murray State	3	–	3	6	–	5
Eastern Illinois	1	–	5	1	–	10
Tennessee Tech	1	–	5	3	–	8
$ – Conference champion; ^ – FCS playoff participant; Rankings from STATS Poll

2022 Ohio Valley Conference football standings
	Conf.			Overall
Team	W		L	W		L
No. 15 Southeast Missouri State +^	5	–	0	9	–	3
UT Martin +	5	–	0	7	–	4
Tennessee State	2	–	3	4	–	7
Tennessee Tech	2	–	3	4	–	7
Lindenwood *	2	–	3	7	–	3
Eastern Illinois	1	–	4	2	–	9
Murray State	1	–	4	2	–	9
+ – Conference co-champions; ^ – FCS playoff participant; Note: Lindenwood ineligible for OVC title and FCS postseason play due to transition from NCAA Division II.; Rankings from STATS Poll

2023 Big South–OVC football standings
	Conf.			Overall
Team	W		L	W		L
Gardner–Webb +^	5	–	1	7	–	5
No. 25 UT Martin +	5	–	1	8	–	3
Eastern Illinois	4	–	2	8	–	3
Bryant	4	–	2	6	–	5
Southeast Missouri State	3	–	3	4	–	7
Tennessee Tech	2	–	4	4	–	7
Robert Morris	2	–	4	4	–	7
Charleston Southern	2	–	4	4	–	7
Tennessee State	2	–	4	6	–	5
Lindenwood *	1	–	5	3	–	7
+ – Conference co-champions; ^ – FCS playoff participant; Note: Lindenwood ineligible for Big South–OVC title and FCS postseason play due to transition from NCAA Division II.; Rankings from STATS Poll

2024 Big South–OVC football standings
	Conf.			Overall
Team	W		L	W		L
No. 16 Southeast Missouri State +^	6	–	2	9	–	4
Tennessee Tech +	6	–	2	7	–	5
No. 17 UT Martin +^	6	–	2	9	–	5
No. 19 Tennessee State +^	6	–	2	9	–	4
Lindenwood*	4	–	4	5	–	7
Western Illinois	3	–	5	4	–	8
Gardner–Webb	3	–	5	4	–	8
Eastern Illinois	2	–	6	3	–	9
Charleston Southern	0	–	8	1	–	11
+ – Conference co-champions; ^ – FCS playoff participant; Note: Lindenwood ineligible for Big South–OVC title and FCS postseason play due to transition from NCAA Division II.; Rankings from STATS Poll

2025 OVC–Big South football standings
	Conf.			Overall
Team	W		L	W		L
Charleston Southern	0	–	0	0	–	0
Eastern Illinois	0	–	0	0	–	0
Gardner–Webb	0	–	0	0	–	0
Lindenwood	0	–	0	0	–	0
Southeast Missouri State	0	–	0	0	–	0
Tennessee State	0	–	0	0	–	0
No. 21 Tennessee Tech	0	–	0	0	–	0
UT Martin	0	–	0	0	–	0
Western Illinois	0	–	0	0	–	0
As of August 25, 2025; Rankings from STATS Poll
