= Roy Gregory =

Roy Gregory may refer to:

- Roy Gregory (footballer)
- Roy Gregory (American football)
