= 1993 East Tennessee State Buccaneers football team =

American college football season

1993 East Tennessee State Buccaneers football
- Conference: Southern Conference
- Record: 5–6 (3–5 SoCon)
- Head coach: Mike Cavan (2nd season)
- Home stadium: Memorial Center

1993 Southern Conference football standings
	Conf.					Overall
Team	W		L		T	W		L		T
No. 2 Georgia Southern $^	7	–	1	–	0	10	–	3	–	0
No. 9 Marshall ^	6	–	2	–	0	11	–	4	–	0
Western Carolina	5	–	3	–	0	6	–	5	–	0
Furman	4	–	4	–	0	5	–	5	–	1
The Citadel	4	–	4	–	0	7	–	5	–	0
Appalachian State	4	–	4	–	0	4	–	7	–	0
East Tennessee State	3	–	5	–	0	5	–	6	–	0
Chattanooga	2	–	6	–	0	4	–	7	–	0
VMI	1	–	7	–	0	1	–	10	–	0
$ – Conference champion; ^ – NCAA Division I-AA playoff participant; Rankings from The Sports Network poll

The 1993 East Tennessee State Buccaneers football team was an American football team that represented East Tennessee State University as a member of the Southern Conference (SoCon) during the 1993 NCAA Division I-AA football season. Led by second-year head coach Mike Cavan, the Buccaneers compiled and overall record of 5–6, with a mark of 3–5 in conference play, and finished seventh in the SoCon.

== Schedule ==
Date	Opponent	Site	Result	Attendance	Source
September 4	Wingate*	Memorial Center; Johnson City, TN	W 44–17		
September 11	Mars Hill*	Memorial Center; Johnson City, TN	W 24–0		
September 18	at VMI	Alumni Memorial Field; Lexington, VA	W 10–7	8,137	
September 25	at Furman	Paladin Stadium; Greenville, SC	L 21–45	10,642	
October 2	at Appalachian State	Kidd Brewer Stadium; Boone, NC	L 16–20	19,111	
October 9	The Citadel	Memorial Center; Jackson City, TN	W 20–17	5,279	
October 16	No. 25 Western Carolina^{†}	Memorial Center; Johnson City, TN	L 24–25	6,061	
October 23	at Clemson*	Memorial Stadium; Clemson, SC	L 0–27	66,672	
November 6	at No. 2 Marshall	Marshall University Stadium; Huntington, WV	L 9–33	19,018	
November 13	Chattanooga	Memorial Center; Johnson City, TN	W 21–0	4,626	
November 20	No. 2 Georgia Southern	Memorial Center; Johnson City, TN	L 24–31	4,615	
*Non-conference game; ^{†}Homecoming; Rankings from The Sports Network Poll released prior to the game
