= 1993 VMI Keydets football team =

American college football season

1993 VMI Keydets football
- Conference: Southern Conference
- Record: 1–10 (1–7 SoCon)
- Head coach: Jim Shuck (5th season)
- Home stadium: Alumni Memorial Field

1993 Southern Conference football standings
	Conf.					Overall
Team	W		L		T	W		L		T
No. 2 Georgia Southern $^	7	–	1	–	0	10	–	3	–	0
No. 9 Marshall ^	6	–	2	–	0	11	–	4	–	0
Western Carolina	5	–	3	–	0	6	–	5	–	0
Furman	4	–	4	–	0	5	–	5	–	1
The Citadel	4	–	4	–	0	7	–	5	–	0
Appalachian State	4	–	4	–	0	4	–	7	–	0
East Tennessee State	3	–	5	–	0	5	–	6	–	0
Chattanooga	2	–	6	–	0	4	–	7	–	0
VMI	1	–	7	–	0	1	–	10	–	0
$ – Conference champion; ^ – NCAA Division I-AA playoff participant; Rankings from The Sports Network poll

The 1993 VMI Keydets football team was an American football team that represented the Virginia Military Institute (VMI) as a member of the Southern Conference (SoCon) during the 1993 NCAA Division I-AA football season. In their fifth year under head coach Jim Shuck, the team compiled an overall record of 1–10, with a mark of 1–7 in conference play, placing ninth in the SoCon. Shuck was fired in December. He compiled a record of 14–40–1 during his tenure of head coach of the Keydets from 1989 through 1993.

== Schedule ==
Date	Opponent	Site	Result	Attendance	Source
September 4	at Richmond*	University of Richmond Stadium; Richmond, VA (rivalry)	L 14–38	9,842	
September 18	East Tennessee State	Alumni Memorial Field; Lexington, VA	L 7–10	8,137	
September 25	at Army*	Michie Stadium; West Point, NY	L 9–31	32,441	
October 2	vs. No. 18 William & Mary*	Foreman Field; Norfolk, VA (Oyster Bowl, rivalry)	L 6–49	14,000	
October 9	at No. 5 Marshall	Marshall University Stadium; Huntington, WV	L 0–51	19,187	
October 16	Chattanooga	Alumni Memorial Field; Lexington, VA	W 35–29 ^{2OT}	7,200	
October 23	No. 6 Georgia Southern	Alumni Memorial Field; Lexington, VA	L 0–57	5,600	
October 30	at Furman	Paladin Stadium; Greenville, SC	L 0–24	10,709	
November 6	at No. 20 Western Carolina	E. J. Whitmire Stadium; Cullowhee, NC	L 14–38	10,116	
November 13	at The Citadel	Johnson Hagood Stadium; Charleston, SC (rivalry)	L 33–34	18,213	
November 20	Appalachian State	Alumni Memorial Field; Lexington, VA	L 21–35	3,533	
*Non-conference game; Rankings from NCAA Division I-AA Football Committee Poll released prior to the game
