= 1960 East Tennessee State Buccaneers football team =

American college football season

1960 East Tennessee State Buccaneers football
- Conference: Ohio Valley Conference
- Record: 3–4–2 (1–3–2 OVC)
- Head coach: Star Wood (8th season)
- Home stadium: College Stadium

1960 Ohio Valley Conference football standings
	Conf.					Overall
Team	W		L		T	W		L		T
Tennessee Tech $	6	–	0	–	0	8	–	2	–	0
Middle Tennessee	4	–	2	–	0	5	–	5	–	0
Murray State	4	–	2	–	0	5	–	5	–	0
Morehead State	2	–	4	–	0	5	–	4	–	0
East Tennessee State	1	–	3	–	2	3	–	4	–	2
Eastern Kentucky	1	–	4	–	1	3	–	6	–	1
Western Kentucky	1	–	4	–	1	2	–	6	–	1
$ – Conference champion

The 1960 East Tennessee State Buccaneers football team represented East Tennessee State College (now known as East Tennessee State University) as a member of the Ohio Valley Conference (OVC) during the 1960 college football season. Led by eighth-year head coach Star Wood, the Buccaneers compiled an overall record of 3–4–2, with a mark of 1–3–2 in conference play, and finished fifth in the OVC.

== Schedule ==
Date	Opponent	Site	Result	Attendance	Source
September 17	at Murray State	Cutchin Stadium; Murray, KY	L 0–14	3,000	
September 24	Western Kentucky	College Stadium; Johnson City, TN	T 7–7	4,500	
October 1	Jacksonville State*	College Stadium; Johnson City, TN	W 20–14	4,200	
October 8	at Tennessee Tech	Overall Field; Cookeville, TN	L 7–21	3,500	
October 15	at Eastern Kentucky	Hanger Field; Richmond, KY	T 0–0	6,000	
October 22	at Wofford*	Synder Field; Spartanburg, SC	L 13–23	3,400	
October 29	Morehead State	College Stadium; Johnson City, TN	W 38–13	3,000	
November 5	at Austin Peay*	Municipal Stadium; Clarksville, TN	W 35–14	3,500	
November 12	Middle Tennessee	College Stadium; Johnson City, TN	L 6–14	5,000	
*Non-conference game; Source:
