= 1991 Tennessee–Martin Pacers football team =

American college football season

1991 Tennessee–Martin Pacers football
- Conference: Independent
- Record: 5–6
- Head coach: Don McLeary (6th season)
- Home stadium: Pacer Stadium

1991 NCAA Division II independents football records
	Conf.			Overall
Team	W	L	T	W		L		T
No. 20 Wofford ^		–		9	–	3	–	0
Springfield		–		7	–	3	–	0
Southern Connecticut State		–		6	–	3	–	0
UC Santa Barbara		–		5	–	3	–	0
Michigan Tech		–		6	–	4	–	0
Saint Mary's		–		6	–	5	–	0
Tennessee–Martin		–		5	–	6	–	0
Troy State		–		5	–	6	–	0
American International		–		4	–	5	–	1
New Haven		–		3	–	7	–	0
Wayne State (NE)		–		3	–	7	–	0
Kentucky State		–		2	–	9	–	0
Central Connecticut		–		1	–	8	–	1
Lees–McRae		–		1	–	9	–	0
^ – NCAA Division II playoff participant; Rankings from NCAA Division II Football Committee poll

The 1991 Tennessee–Martin Pacers football team represented the University of Tennessee at Martin as an independent during the 1991 NCAA Division II football season. Led by sixth-year head coach Don McLeary, the Pacers compiled an overall record of 5–6.

== Schedule ==
Date	Opponent	Site	Result	Attendance	Source
August 30	at Chattanooga	Chamberlain Field; Chattanooga, TN	L 14–21	9,531	
September 7	Southeast Missouri State	Pacer Stadium; Martin, TN	W 36–29	6,637	
September 14	Washburn	Pacer Stadium; Martin, TN	W 28–7	3,287	
September 28	at Morehead State	Jayne Stadium; Morehead, KY	W 32–28	5,700	
October 5	Tennessee Tech	Pacer Stadium; Martin, TN	W 24–16	6,768	
October 12	at Murray State	Roy Stewart Stadium; Murray, KY	L 34–40	7,611	
October 19	at Delta State	Delta Field; Cleveland, MS	L 27–37	4,798	
October 26	at No. 2 (I-AA) Eastern Kentucky	Roy Kidd Stadium; Richmond, KY	L 21–56	17,800	
October 31	at No. 7 (I-AA) Middle Tennessee	Johnny "Red" Floyd Stadium; Murfreesboro, TN	L 14–51	9,500	
November 9	Austin Peay	Pacer Stadium; Martin, TN	W 34–28	6,979	
November 23	at No. T–19 (I-AA) McNeese State	Cowboy Stadium; Lake Charles, LA	L 16–17	13,313	
Rankings from NCAA Division II Football Committee Poll released prior to the game
