= 1993 Appalachian State Mountaineers football team =

American college football season

1993 Appalachian State Mountaineers football
- Conference: Southern Conference
- Record: 4–7 (4–4 SoCon)
- Head coach: Jerry Moore (5th season)
- Home stadium: Kidd Brewer Stadium

1993 Southern Conference football standings
	Conf.					Overall
Team	W		L		T	W		L		T
No. 2 Georgia Southern $^	7	–	1	–	0	10	–	3	–	0
No. 9 Marshall ^	6	–	2	–	0	11	–	4	–	0
Western Carolina	5	–	3	–	0	6	–	5	–	0
Furman	4	–	4	–	0	5	–	5	–	1
The Citadel	4	–	4	–	0	7	–	5	–	0
Appalachian State	4	–	4	–	0	4	–	7	–	0
East Tennessee State	3	–	5	–	0	5	–	6	–	0
Chattanooga	2	–	6	–	0	4	–	7	–	0
VMI	1	–	7	–	0	1	–	10	–	0
$ – Conference champion; ^ – NCAA Division I-AA playoff participant; Rankings from The Sports Network poll

The 1993 Appalachian State Mountaineers football team was an American football team that represented Appalachian State University as a member of the Southern Conference (SoCon) during the 1993 NCAA Division I-AA football season. In their fifth year under head coach Jerry Moore, the Mountaineers compiled an overall record of 4–7 with a conference mark of 4–4.

== Schedule ==
Date	Opponent	Rank	Site	Result	Attendance	Source
September 4	at No. 25 North Carolina A&T*	No. 18	Aggie Stadium; Greensboro, NC	L 10–22	10,700	
September 11	No. 25 Liberty*		Kidd Brewer Stadium; Boone, NC	L 14–20	12,867	
September 18	at Wake Forest*		Groves Stadium; Winston-Salem, NC	L 3–20	26,918	
September 25	at The Citadel		Johnson Hagood Stadium; Charleston, SC	L 14–27	15,001	
October 2	East Tennessee State		Kidd Brewer Stadium; Boone, NC	W 20–16	19,111	
October 9	at Furman		Paladin Stadium; Greenville, SC	L 21–27	12,707	
October 16	No. 6 Georgia Southern		Kidd Brewer Stadium; Boone, NC (rivalry)	L 28–34	10,939	
October 23	at No. 4 Marshall		Marshall University Stadium; Huntington, WV (rivalry)	L 3–35	25,175	
October 30	Chattanooga		Kidd Brewer Stadium; Boone, NC	W 39–14	9,546	
November 13	No. 16 Western Carolina		Kidd Brewer Stadium; Boone, NC (rivalry)	W 20–16	14,767	
November 20	at VMI		Alumni Memorial Field; Lexington, VA	W 35–21	3,533	
*Non-conference game; Rankings from The Sports Network Poll released prior to the game
