= 1993 Georgia Southern Eagles football team =

American college football season

1993 Georgia Southern Eagles football

SoCon champion

NCAA Division I-AA Quarterfinal, L 14–34 at Youngstown State
- Conference: Southern Conference

Ranking
- Sports Network: No. 2
- Record: 10–3 (7–1 SoCon)
- Head coach: Tim Stowers (4th season)
- Defensive coordinator: Tommy Spangler (4th season)
- Home stadium: Paulson Stadium

1993 Southern Conference football standings
	Conf.					Overall
Team	W		L		T	W		L		T
No. 2 Georgia Southern $^	7	–	1	–	0	10	–	3	–	0
No. 9 Marshall ^	6	–	2	–	0	11	–	4	–	0
Western Carolina	5	–	3	–	0	6	–	5	–	0
Furman	4	–	4	–	0	5	–	5	–	1
The Citadel	4	–	4	–	0	7	–	5	–	0
Appalachian State	4	–	4	–	0	4	–	7	–	0
East Tennessee State	3	–	5	–	0	5	–	6	–	0
Chattanooga	2	–	6	–	0	4	–	7	–	0
VMI	1	–	7	–	0	1	–	10	–	0
$ – Conference champion; ^ – NCAA Division I-AA playoff participant; Rankings from The Sports Network poll

The 1993 Georgia Southern Eagles football team represented Georgia Southern University as a member of the Southern Conference (SoCon) during the 1993 NCAA Division I-AA football season. Led by fourth-year head coach Tim Stowers, the Eagles compiled an overall record of 10–3 with a conference mark of 7–1, winning the SoCon title. Georgia Southern was invited to the NCAA Division I-AA Football Championship playoffs, where they beat Eastern Kentucky in the first round before losing to eventual national champion Youngstown State in the quarterfinals. The Eagles played their home games at Paulson Stadium in Statesboro, Georgia.

== Schedule ==
Date	Opponent	Rank	Site	Result	Attendance	Source
September 4	Savannah State*	No. 11	Paulson Stadium; Statesboro, GA	W 35–3	11,645	
September 11	No. 24 The Citadel	No. 8	Paulson Stadium; Statesboro, GA	W 16–6	12,921	
September 18	at No. 1 Marshall	No. 7	Marshall University Stadium; Huntington, WV	L 3–13	29,464	
September 25	Chattanooga	No. 8	Paulson Stadium; Statesboro, GA	W 45–0	13,771	
October 2	at No. 3 (I-A) Miami (FL)*	No. 7	Miami Orange Bowl; Miami, FL	L 7–30	43,147	
October 9	No. 20 Western Carolina	No. 8	Paulson Stadium; Statesboro, GA	W 19–18	14,133	
October 16	at Appalachian State	No. 6	Kidd Brewer Stadium; Boone, NC (rivalry)	W 34–28	10,939	
October 23	at VMI	No. 6	Alumni Memorial Field; Lexington, VA	W 57–0	5,600	
November 6	Furman	No. 3	Paulson Stadium; Statesboro, GA	W 31–19	17,984	
November 13	Concord*	No. 3	Paulson Stadium; Statesboro, GA	W 51–13	12,706	
November 20	at East Tennessee State	No. 2	Memorial Center; Johnson City, TN	W 31–24	4,615	
November 27	No. 17 Eastern Kentucky*	No. 2	Paulson Stadium; Statesboro, GA (NCAA Division I-AA First Round)	W 14–12	7,278	
December 4	at No. 7 Youngstown State*	No. 2	Stambaugh Stadium; Youngstown, OH (NCAA Division I-AA Quarterfinal)	L 14–34	9,503	
*Non-conference game; Rankings from The Sports Network Poll released prior to the game
