= 1993 The Citadel Bulldogs football team =

American college football season

1993 The Citadel Bulldogs football
- Conference: Southern Conference
- Record: 5–6 (4–4 SoCon)
- Head coach: Charlie Taaffe (7th season)
- Offensive scheme: Option
- Defensive coordinator: Don Powers (5th season)
- Home stadium: Johnson Hagood Stadium

1993 Southern Conference football standings
	Conf.					Overall
Team	W		L		T	W		L		T
No. 2 Georgia Southern $^	7	–	1	–	0	10	–	3	–	0
No. 9 Marshall ^	6	–	2	–	0	11	–	4	–	0
Western Carolina	5	–	3	–	0	6	–	5	–	0
Furman	4	–	4	–	0	5	–	5	–	1
The Citadel	4	–	4	–	0	7	–	5	–	0
Appalachian State	4	–	4	–	0	4	–	7	–	0
East Tennessee State	3	–	5	–	0	5	–	6	–	0
Chattanooga	2	–	6	–	0	4	–	7	–	0
VMI	1	–	7	–	0	1	–	10	–	0
$ – Conference champion; ^ – NCAA Division I-AA playoff participant; Rankings from The Sports Network poll

The 1993 The Citadel Bulldogs football team represented the Citadel, the Military College of South Carolina in the 1993 NCAA Division I-AA football season. Charlie Taaffe served as head coach for the seventh season. The Bulldogs played as members of the Southern Conference and played home games at Johnson Hagood Stadium.

== Schedule ==
Date	Opponent	Rank	Site	Result	Attendance	Source
September 4	Wofford*	No. 13	Johnson Hagood Stadium; Charleston, SC (rivalry)	L 6–20	19,722	
September 11	at No. 8 Georgia Southern	No. 24	Paulson Stadium; Statesboro, GA	L 6–16	12,921	
September 18	at Western Carolina		E. J. Whitmire Stadium; Cullowhee, NC	L 18–38	9,286	
September 25	Appalachian State		Johnson Hagood Stadium; Charleston, SC	W 27–14	15,001	
October 2	Lees–McRae*		Johnson Hagood Stadium; Charleston, SC	W 62–7	11,577	
October 9	at East Tennessee State		Memorial Center; Jackson City, TN	L 17–20	5,279	
October 16	Furman		Johnson Hagood Stadium; Charleston, SC (rivalry)	W 20–10	17,393	
October 23	at Air Force*		Falcon Stadium; Colorado Springs, CO	L 0–35	39,702	
October 30	No. 2 Marshall		Johnson Hagood Stadium; Charleston, SC	L 15–35	7,110	
November 6	at Chattanooga		Chamberlain Field; Chattanooga, TN	W 41–27	5,206	
November 13	VMI^{†}		Johnson Hagood Stadium; Charleston, SC (Military Classic of the South)	W 34–33	18,213	
*Non-conference game; ^{†}Homecoming; Rankings from The Sports Network Poll released prior to the game

== Ranking movements ==
Ranking movements Legend: ██ Increase in ranking ██ Decrease in ranking — = Not ranked ( ) = First-place votes
	Week												
Poll	Pre	1	2	3	4	5	6	7	8	9	10	11	Final
Sports Network	13 (2)	24	—	—	—	—	—	—	—	—	—	—	—
