= 1993 Furman Paladins football team =

American college football season

1993 Furman Paladins football
- Conference: Southern Conference
- Record: 5–5–1 (4–4 SoCon)
- Head coach: Jimmy Satterfield (8th season)
- Captains: Ryan Livezey; Milan Sterling; Billy Whitley
- Home stadium: Paladin Stadium

1993 Southern Conference football standings
	Conf.					Overall
Team	W		L		T	W		L		T
No. 2 Georgia Southern $^	7	–	1	–	0	10	–	3	–	0
No. 9 Marshall ^	6	–	2	–	0	11	–	4	–	0
Western Carolina	5	–	3	–	0	6	–	5	–	0
Furman	4	–	4	–	0	5	–	5	–	1
The Citadel	4	–	4	–	0	7	–	5	–	0
Appalachian State	4	–	4	–	0	4	–	7	–	0
East Tennessee State	3	–	5	–	0	5	–	6	–	0
Chattanooga	2	–	6	–	0	4	–	7	–	0
VMI	1	–	7	–	0	1	–	10	–	0
$ – Conference champion; ^ – NCAA Division I-AA playoff participant; Rankings from The Sports Network poll

The 1993 Furman Paladins football team was an American football team that represented Furman University as a member of the Southern Conference (SoCon) during the 1993 NCAA Division I-AA football season. In their eighth year under head coach Jimmy Satterfield, the Paladins compiled an overall record of 5–5–1 with a mark of 4–4 in conference play, finishing tied for fourth in the SoCon.

== Schedule ==
Date	Opponent	Site	Result	Attendance	Source
September 4	Connecticut*	Paladin Stadium; Greenville, SC	W 26–17	9,193	
September 11	at Georgia Tech*	Bobby Dodd Stadium; Atlanta, GA	L 7–37	43,200	
September 18	Wofford*	Paladin Stadium; Greenville, SC (rivalry)	T 14–14		
September 25	East Tennessee State	Paladin Stadium; Greenville, SC	W 45–21	10,642	
October 2	at No. 22 Western Carolina	Whitmire Stadium; Cullowhee, NC	L 20–23	11,632	
October 9	Appalachian State	Paladin Stadium; Greenville, SC	W 27–21	12,707	
October 16	at The Citadel	Johnson Hagood Stadium; Charleston, SC (rivalry)	L 10–20	17,393	
October 30	VMI	Paladin Stadium; Greenville, SC	W 24–0	10,709	
November 6	at No. 3 Georgia Southern	Paulson Stadium; Statesboro, GA	L 19–31	17,984	
November 13	No. 2 Marshall	Paladin Stadium; Greenville, SC	W 17–3	12,130	
November 20	at Chattanooga	Chamberlain Field; Chattanooga, TN	L 42–45	2,220	
*Non-conference game; Rankings from The Sports Network Poll released prior to the game
