= 1993 Marshall Thundering Herd football team =

American college football season

1993 Marshall Thundering Herd football

NCAA Division I-AA Championship Game, L 5–17 vs. Youngstown State
- Conference: Southern Conference

Ranking
- Sports Network: No. 9
- Record: 11–4 (6–2 SoCon)
- Head coach: Jim Donnan (4th season)
- Offensive coordinator: Chris Scelfo (1st season)
- Defensive coordinator: Mickey Matthews (4th season)
- Captains: William King; Shannon King; Glenn Pedro; Chris Deaton; Trevor Thomas; Rodney Garrett
- Home stadium: Marshall University Stadium

1993 Southern Conference football standings
	Conf.					Overall
Team	W		L		T	W		L		T
No. 2 Georgia Southern $^	7	–	1	–	0	10	–	3	–	0
No. 9 Marshall ^	6	–	2	–	0	11	–	4	–	0
Western Carolina	5	–	3	–	0	6	–	5	–	0
Furman	4	–	4	–	0	5	–	5	–	1
The Citadel	4	–	4	–	0	7	–	5	–	0
Appalachian State	4	–	4	–	0	4	–	7	–	0
East Tennessee State	3	–	5	–	0	5	–	6	–	0
Chattanooga	2	–	6	–	0	4	–	7	–	0
VMI	1	–	7	–	0	1	–	10	–	0
$ – Conference champion; ^ – NCAA Division I-AA playoff participant; Rankings from The Sports Network poll

The 1993 Marshall Thundering Herd football team represented Marshall University as a member of the Southern Conference (SoCon) during the 1993 NCAA Division I-AA football season. Led by fourth-year head coach Jim Donnan, the Thundering Herd compiled an overall record of 11–4 with a mark of 6–2 in conference play, placing second behind Georgia Southern. Marshall advanced to the NCAA Division I-AA Championship playoffs, where they defeated Howard in the first round, Delaware in the quarterfinals, and Troy State in the semifinals before falling to Youngstown State in the NCAA Division I-AA Championship Game. Marshall had beaten Youngstown State the year before in the NCAA Division I-AA title game and lost to the Penguins in the 1991 title game. Marshall played home games at Marshall University Stadium in Huntington, West Virginia.

== Schedule ==
Date	Opponent	Rank	Site	TV	Result	Attendance	Source
September 4	Morehead State*	No. 1	Marshall University Stadium; Huntington, WV		W 56–0	27,117	
September 11	Murray State*	No. 1	Marshall University Stadium; Huntington, WV		W 29–3	21,208	
September 18	No. 7 Georgia Southern	No. 1	Marshall University Stadium; Huntington, WV		W 13–3	29,464	
October 2	at Chattanooga	No. 1	Chamberlain Field; Chattanooga, TN		L 31–33	9,302	
October 9	VMI	No. 5	Marshall University Stadium; Huntington, WV		W 51–0	19,187	
October 16	at NC State*	No. 3	Carter–Finley Stadium; Raleigh, NC		L 17–24	36,016	
October 23	Appalachian State	No. 4	Marshall University Stadium; Huntington, WV (rivalry)		W 35–3	25,175	
October 30	at The Citadel	No. 2	Johnson Hagood Stadium; Charleston, SC		W 35–15	7,110	
November 6	East Tennessee State^{†}	No. 2	Marshall University Stadium; Huntington, WV		W 33–9	19,018	
November 13	at Furman	No. 2	Paladin Stadium; Greenville, SC		L 3–17	12,130	
November 20	Western Carolina	No. 9	Marshall University Stadium; Huntington, WV		W 20–16	18,055	
November 27	No. 8 Howard*	No. 9	Marshall University Stadium; Huntington, WV (NCAA Division I-AA First Round)		W 28–14		
December 4	No. 18 Delaware*	No. 9	Marshall University Stadium; Huntington, WV (NCAA Division I-AA Quarterfinal)		W 34–31	13,687	
December 11	No. 1 Troy State*	No. 9	Marshall University Stadium; Huntington, WV (NCAA Division I-AA Semifinal)		W 24–21	14,472	
December 19	No. 7 Youngstown State*	No. 9	Marshall University Stadium; Huntington, WV (NCAA Division I-AA National Championship Game)	CBS	L 5–17	29,218	
*Non-conference game; ^{†}Homecoming; Rankings from The Sports Network Poll released prior to the game
