= Joe Gilliam Sr. =

American football player and coach

Biographical details
- Born: March 27, 1927; Steubenville, Ohio, U.S.
- Died: November 14, 2012 (aged 85); Nashville, Tennessee, U.S.

Playing career

Football
- 1947–1949: West Virginia State

Basketball
- 1947–1950: West Virginia State
- Positions: Quarterback (football); Guard (basketball)

Coaching career (HC unless noted)

Football
- 1952–1954: Oliver HS (KY)
- 1955–1956: Jackson State (assistant)
- 1957–1958: Kentucky State
- 1959–1960: Bate HS (KY)
- 1961–1962: Jackson State (backfield)
- 1963–1983: Tennessee State (DC)
- 1989–1992: Tennessee State

Head coaching record
- Overall: 23–36–2 (college)

Accomplishments and honors

Awards
- WVSU Sports Hall of Fame (1987); OVC Coach of the Year (1990)

Joseph Wiley Gilliam Sr. (March 27, 1927 – November 14, 2012) was an American football coach. He played football and basketball in college.

== Biography ==
Gilliam was born in Steubenville, Ohio and graduated from Steubenville High School in 1945. He began his collegiate playing career at Indiana University Bloomington, where he played on the 1945 Indiana Hoosiers football team. After one semester at Indiana University, he joined the United States Army. In the fall of 1947, he enrolled at West Virginia State College (class of 1952), where he was an All-American at quarterback.

Gilliam was head football and basketball coach at Oliver School in Winchester, Kentucky from 1952 to 1954, winning a state championship in football in 1954.

Gilliam joined coach John Merritt's coaching staff at Jackson State University in 1955 and left in 1957 to become head coach at Kentucky State University. After compiling a record of 2–13–1 at Kentucky State, he coached briefly at Bate High School in Danville, KY before returning to Merritt's staff at Jackson State. He followed Merritt to Tennessee State University, where, as defensive coordinator, he helped the Tigers to four undefeated seasons and seven black college football national championships in a 20-year span.

Gilliam served as head coach at Tennessee State from 1989 to 1992, earning Ohio Valley Conference Coach Of The Year honors in 1990.

Gilliam is father of former Pittsburgh Steelers quarterback Joe Gilliam, and the grandfather of R&B singer Joi. Gilliam was inducted into the Tennessee Sports Hall Of Fame in 2007. At the time of his death in 2012, Gilliam was residing in Nashville.

== Head coaching record ==
=== College ===
Year	Team	Overall	Conference	Standing	Bowl/playoffs
Kentucky State Thorobreds (Midwest Athletic Association) (1957–1958)
1957	Kentucky State	3–6	1–3	4th	
1958	Kentucky State	0–7–1	0–3	5th	
Kentucky State:		3–13–1	1–6		
Tennessee State Tigers (Ohio Valley Conference) (1989–1992)
1989	Tennessee State	5–5–1	3–3	T–3rd	
1990	Tennessee State	7–4	4–2	3rd	
1991	Tennessee State	3–8	2–5	T–6th	
1992	Tennessee State	5–6	5–3	4th	
Tennessee State:		20–23–1	14–13		
Total:		23–36–2			
