= 1993 Western Carolina Catamounts football team =

American college football season

1993 Western Carolina Catamounts football
- Conference: Southern Conference
- Record: 6–5 (5–3 SoCon)
- Head coach: Steve Hodgin (4th season)
- Home stadium: E. J. Whitmire Stadium

1993 Southern Conference football standings
	Conf.					Overall
Team	W		L		T	W		L		T
No. 2 Georgia Southern $^	7	–	1	–	0	10	–	3	–	0
No. 9 Marshall ^	6	–	2	–	0	11	–	4	–	0
Western Carolina	5	–	3	–	0	6	–	5	–	0
Furman	4	–	4	–	0	5	–	5	–	1
The Citadel	4	–	4	–	0	7	–	5	–	0
Appalachian State	4	–	4	–	0	4	–	7	–	0
East Tennessee State	3	–	5	–	0	5	–	6	–	0
Chattanooga	2	–	6	–	0	4	–	7	–	0
VMI	1	–	7	–	0	1	–	10	–	0
$ – Conference champion; ^ – NCAA Division I-AA playoff participant; Rankings from The Sports Network poll

The 1993 Western Carolina Catamounts team was an American football team that represented Western Carolina University as a member of the Southern Conference (SoCon) during the 1993 NCAA Division I-AA football season. In their fourth year under head coach Steve Hodgin, the team compiled an overall record of 6–5, with a mark of 5–3 in conference play, and finished third in the SoCon.

== Schedule ==
Date	Opponent	Rank	Site	Result	Attendance	Source
September 4	at Kansas*	No. 8	Memorial Stadium; Lawrence, KS	L 3–46	31,500	
September 18	The Citadel	No. 13	E. J. Whitmire Stadium; Cullowhee, NC	W 38–18	9,286	
September 25	No. 12 North Carolina A&T*	No. 11	E. J. Whitmire Stadium; Cullowhee, NC	L 7–34	11,288	
October 2	Furman	No. 22	E. J. Whitmire Stadium; Cullowhee, NC	W 23–20	11,632	
October 9	at No. 8 Georgia Southern	No. 20	Paulson Stadium; Statesboro, GA	L 18–19	14,133	
October 16	at East Tennessee State	No. 25	Memorial Center; Johnson City, TN	W 25–24	6,061	
October 23	at Chattanooga	No. 24	Chamberlain Field; Chattanooga, TN	W 41–10	8,523	
October 30	Newberry*	No. 22	E. J. Whitmire Stadium; Cullowhee, NC	W 56–10	5,238	
November 6	VM	No. 20	E. J. Whitmire Stadium; Cullowhee, NC	W 38–14	10,116	
November 13	at Appalachian State	No. 16	Kidd Brewer Stadium; Boone, NC (rivalry)	L 16–20	14,767	
November 20	at No. 9 Marshall		Marshall University Stadium; Huntington, WV	L 16–20	18,055	
*Non-conference game; Rankings from The Sports Network Poll released prior to the game
