= 1993 Chattanooga Moccasins football team =

American college football season

1993 Chattanooga Moccasins football
- Conference: Southern Conference
- Record: 4–7 (2–6 SoCon)
- Head coach: Tommy West (1st season)
- Captains: Jerry Ellison; Chris Jones
- Home stadium: Chamberlain Field

1993 Southern Conference football standings
	Conf.					Overall
Team	W		L		T	W		L		T
No. 2 Georgia Southern $^	7	–	1	–	0	10	–	3	–	0
No. 9 Marshall ^	6	–	2	–	0	11	–	4	–	0
Western Carolina	5	–	3	–	0	6	–	5	–	0
Furman	4	–	4	–	0	5	–	5	–	1
The Citadel	4	–	4	–	0	7	–	5	–	0
Appalachian State	4	–	4	–	0	4	–	7	–	0
East Tennessee State	3	–	5	–	0	5	–	6	–	0
Chattanooga	2	–	6	–	0	4	–	7	–	0
VMI	1	–	7	–	0	1	–	10	–	0
$ – Conference champion; ^ – NCAA Division I-AA playoff participant; Rankings from The Sports Network poll

The 1993 Chattanooga Moccasins football team represented the University of Tennessee at Chattanooga as a member of the Southern Conference (SoCon) in the 1993 NCAA Division I-AA football season. The Moccasins were led by first-year head coach Tommy West and played their home games at Chamberlain Field. They finished the season 4–7 overall and 2–6 in SoCon play to tie for seventh place.

== Schedule ==
Date	Opponent	Site	Result	Attendance	Source
September 2	at Tennessee–Martin*	Pacer Stadium; Martin, TN	W 26–7	5,847	
September 11	Ole Miss*	Vaught–Hemingway Stadium; Oxford, MS	L 7–40	24,500	
September 18	Gardner–Webb*	Chamberlain Field; Chattanooga, TN	W 59–34	9,118	
September 25	at No. 8 Georgia Southern	Paulson Stadium; Statesboro, GA	L 0–45	13,771	
October 2	No. 1 Marshall	Chamberlain Field; Chattanooga, TN	W 33–31	9,302	
October 16	at VMI	Alumni Memorial Field; Lexington, VA	L 29–35 ^{2OT}	7,200	
October 23	No. 24 Western Carolina^{†}	Chamberlain Field; Chattanooga, TN	L 10–41	8,523	
October 30	at Appalachian State	Kidd Brewer Stadium; Boone, NC	L 14–39	9,546	
November 6	The Citadel	Chamberlain Field; Chattanooga, TN	L 27–41	5,206	
November 13	at East Tennessee State	Memorial Center; Johnson City, TN	L 0–21	4,626	
November 20	Furman	Chamberlain Field; Chattanooga, TN	W 45–42	2,220	
*Non-conference game; ^{†}Homecoming; Rankings from The Sports Network Poll released prior to the game

== Roster ==
1993 Chattanooga Mocs football team roster
Players
Coaches
Offense

Pos.	#	Name	Class
RB	40	Jerry Ellison	Sr
WR	88	Terrell Owens	So

Defense

Pos.	#	Name	Class

Special teams

Pos.	#	Name	Class

Head coach

- Tommy West

Coordinators/assistant coaches

Legend

- (C) Team captain
- (S) Suspended
- (I) Ineligible
- Injured
- Redshirt
