= 1960 Middle Tennessee Blue Raiders football team =

American college football season

1960 Middle Tennessee Blue Raiders football
- Conference: Ohio Valley Conference
- Record: 5–5 (4–2 OVC)
- Head coach: Charles M. Murphy (14th season)
- Captains: J. Windham; Nicky Lynch
- Home stadium: Horace Jones Field

1960 Ohio Valley Conference football standings
	Conf.					Overall
Team	W		L		T	W		L		T
Tennessee Tech $	6	–	0	–	0	8	–	2	–	0
Middle Tennessee	4	–	2	–	0	5	–	5	–	0
Murray State	4	–	2	–	0	5	–	5	–	0
Morehead State	2	–	4	–	0	5	–	4	–	0
East Tennessee State	1	–	3	–	2	3	–	4	–	2
Eastern Kentucky	1	–	4	–	1	3	–	6	–	1
Western Kentucky	1	–	4	–	1	2	–	6	–	1
$ – Conference champion

The 1960 Middle Tennessee Blue Raiders football team represented the Middle Tennessee State College—now known as Middle Tennessee State University—as a member of the Ohio Valley Conference (OVC) during the 1960 college football season. Led by 14th-year head coach Charles M. Murphy, the Blue Raiders compiled a record an overall record of 5–5 with a mark of 4–2 in conference play, tying for second place in the OVC. The team's captains were J. Windham and Nicky Lynch.

== Schedule ==
Date	Opponent	Site	Result	Attendance	Source
September 17	Austin Peay*	Horace Jones Field; Murfreesboro, TN	W 6–0		
September 24	at Jacksonville State*	College Bowl; Jacksonville, AL	L 0–19		
October 1	at Western Kentucky	Bowling Green, KY (rivalry)	L 13–20		
October 7	Eastern Kentucky	Horace Jones Field; Murfreesboro, TN	W 14–12		
October 14	at No. 6 Chattanooga*	Chamberlain Field; Chattanooga, TN	L 6–24	9,000	
October 22	Morehead State	Horace Jones Field; Murfreesboro, TN	W 28–0		
October 29	Florence State*	Horace Jones Field; Murfreesboro, TN	L 6–7		
November 5	Murray State	Horace Jones Field; Murfreesboro, TN	W 20–3		
November 12	at East Tennessee State	State College Stadium; Johnson City, TN	W 14–6		
November 24	at Tennessee Tech	Overhill Field; Cookeville, TN	L 8–35		
*Non-conference game; Rankings from AP Poll released prior to the game
