= 1991 Eastern Kentucky Colonels football team =

American college football season

1991 Eastern Kentucky Colonels football

OVC champion

NCAA Division I-AA Semifinal, L 7–14 at Marshall
- Conference: Ohio Valley Conference
- Record: 12–2 (7–0 OVC)
- Head coach: Roy Kidd (28th season)
- Home stadium: Roy Kidd Stadium

1991 Ohio Valley Conference football standings
	Conf.					Overall
Team	W		L		T	W		L		T
No. 2 Eastern Kentucky $^	7	–	0	–	0	12	–	2	–	0
No. 9 Middle Tennessee ^	6	–	1	–	0	9	–	4	–	0
Austin Peay	3	–	4	–	0	5	–	6	–	0
Morehead State	3	–	4	–	0	4	–	7	–	0
Southeast Missouri State	3	–	4	–	0	3	–	8	–	0
Tennessee State	2	–	5	–	0	3	–	8	–	0
Tennessee Tech	2	–	5	–	0	2	–	9	–	0
Murray State	1	–	6	–	0	3	–	8	–	0
$ – Conference champion; ^ – NCAA Division I-AA playoff participant; Rankings from NCAA Division I-AA Football Committee poll

The 1991 Eastern Kentucky Colonels football team represented Eastern Kentucky University as a member of the Ohio Valley Conference (OVC) during the 1991 NCAA Division I-AA football season. Led by 28th-year head coach Roy Kidd, the Colonels compiled an overall record of 12–2, with a mark of 7–0 in conference play, and finished as OVC champion. Eastern Kentucky advanced to the NCAA Division I-AA Semifinal and were defeated by Marshall in the semifinals.

== Schedule ==
Date	Opponent	Rank	Site	Result	Attendance	Source
August 31	at Louisville*		Cardinal Stadium; Louisville, KY	L 14–24	38,542	
September 14	at Southeast Missouri State	No. 5	Houck Stadium; Cape Girardeau, MO	W 49–7		
September 21	No. 7 Middle Tennessee	No. T–3	Roy Kidd Stadium; Richmond, KY	W 17–7	20,700	
September 28	at Tennessee Tech	No. T–3	Tucker Stadium; Cookeville, TN	W 19–13		
October 5	No. 6 Georgia Southern*	No. 3	Roy Kidd Stadium; Richmond, KY	W 10–6	16,200	
October 12	Western Kentucky*	No. 3	Roy Kidd Stadium; Richmond, KY (rivalry)	W 37–22	18,800	
October 26	Tennessee–Martin*	No. 2	Roy Kidd Stadium; Richmond, KY	W 56–21		
November 2	at Tennessee State	No. 2	Hale Stadium; Nashville, TN	W 27–20	18,150	
November 9	at Murray State	No. 2	Roy Stewart Stadium; Murray, KY	W 42–17		
November 16	Austin Peay	No. 2	Roy Kidd Stadium; Richmond, KY	W 21–0		
November 23	Morehead State	No. 2	Roy Kidd Stadium; Richmond, KY (rivalry)	W 41–10	10,100	
November 30	No. 17 Appalachian State*	No. 2	Roy Kidd Stadium; Richmond, KY (NCAA Division I-AA First Round)	W 14–3	2,750	
December 7	No. 9 Middle Tennessee*	No. 2	Roy Kidd Stadium; Richmond, KY (NCAA Division I-AA Quarterfinal)	W 23–13		
December 14	at No. 8 Marshall*	No. 2	Marshall University Stadium; Huntington, WV (NCAA Division I-AA Semifinal)	L 7–14	21,084	
*Non-conference game; Rankings from NCAA Division I-AA Football Committee Poll released prior to the game
