= 1993 Morehead State Eagles football team =

American college football season

1993 Morehead State Eagles football
- Conference: Ohio Valley Conference
- Record: 3–8 (2–6 OVC)
- Head coach: Cole Proctor (4th season)
- Home stadium: Jayne Stadium

1993 Ohio Valley Conference football standings
	Conf.					Overall
Team	W		L		T	W		L		T
No. 17 Eastern Kentucky $^	8	–	0	–	0	8	–	4	–	0
No. 22 Tennessee Tech	7	–	1	–	0	8	–	3	–	0
Tennessee–Martin	5	–	3	–	0	6	–	5	–	0
Middle Tennessee	4	–	4	–	0	5	–	6	–	0
Murray State	4	–	4	–	0	4	–	7	–	0
Tennessee State	4	–	4	–	0	4	–	7	–	0
Morehead State	2	–	6	–	0	3	–	8	–	0
Southeast Missouri State	2	–	6	–	0	3	–	8	–	0
Austin Peay	0	–	8	–	0	1	–	10	–	0
$ – Conference champion; ^ – NCAA Division I-AA playoff participant; Rankings from The Sports Network poll

The 1993 Morehead State Eagles football team represented Morehead State University as a member of the Ohio Valley Conference (OVC) during the 1993 NCAA Division I-AA football season. Led by fourth-year head coach Cole Proctor, the Eagles compiled an overall record of 2–6, with a mark of 3–5 in conference play, and finished tied for seventh in the OVC.

== Schedule ==
Date	Opponent	Site	Result	Attendance	Source
September 4	at No. 1 Marshall*	Marshall University Stadium; Huntington, WV	L 0–56	27,117	
September 11	at UAB*	Legion Field; Birmingham, AL	L 14–52	6,051	
September 18	West Virginia Tech*	Jayne Stadium; Morehead, KY	W 52–14	6,100	
September 25	at Tennessee Tech	Tucker Stadium; Cookeville, TN	L 3–21		
October 2	at Southeast Missouri State	Houck Stadium; Cape Girardeau, MO	W 23–21		
October 16	No. 23 Middle Tennessee	Jayne Stadium; Morehead, KY	L 0–45		
October 23	Austin Peay	Jayne Stadium; Morehead, KY	W 23–10	5,200	
October 30	at Tennessee State	Hale Stadium; Nashville, TN	L 0–15	12,141	
November 6	at Murray State	Roy Stewart Stadium; Murray, KY	L 0–39		
November 13	Tennessee–Martin	Jayne Stadium; Morehead, KY	L 0–17		
November 20	No. 18 Eastern Kentucky	Jayne Stadium; Morehead, KY (rivalry)	L 7–44		
*Non-conference game; Rankings from The Sports Network Poll released prior to the game
