= 1991 Tennessee State Tigers football team =

American college football season

1991 Tennessee State Tigers football
- Conference: Ohio Valley Conference
- Record: 3–8 (2–5 OVC)
- Head coach: Joe Gilliam Sr. (3rd season)
- Home stadium: Hale Stadium; Vanderbilt Stadium

1991 Ohio Valley Conference football standings
	Conf.					Overall
Team	W		L		T	W		L		T
No. 2 Eastern Kentucky $^	7	–	0	–	0	12	–	2	–	0
No. 9 Middle Tennessee ^	6	–	1	–	0	9	–	4	–	0
Austin Peay	3	–	4	–	0	5	–	6	–	0
Morehead State	3	–	4	–	0	4	–	7	–	0
Southeast Missouri State	3	–	4	–	0	3	–	8	–	0
Tennessee State	2	–	5	–	0	3	–	8	–	0
Tennessee Tech	2	–	5	–	0	2	–	9	–	0
Murray State	1	–	6	–	0	3	–	8	–	0
$ – Conference champion; ^ – NCAA Division I-AA playoff participant; Rankings from NCAA Division I-AA Football Committee poll

The 1991 Tennessee State Tigers football team represented Tennessee State University as a member of the Ohio Valley Conference (OVC) during the 1991 NCAA Division I-AA football season. Led by third-year head coach Joe Gilliam Sr., the Tigers compiled an overall record of 3–8, with a conference record of 2–5, and finished tied for sixth in the OVC.

== Schedule ==
Date	Opponent	Site	Result	Attendance	Source
August 31	vs. Mississippi Valley State*	Liberty Bowl Memorial Stadium; Memphis, TN (Southern Heritage Classic)	L 7–10	25,891	
September 7	No. 12 Middle Tennessee	Vanderbilt Stadium; Nashville, TN	L 6–42		
September 14	vs. Jackson State*	Legion Field; Birmingham, AL (John A. Merritt Football Classic)	L 19–41	17,581	
September 21	Grambling State*	Hale Stadium; Nashville, TN	L 21–24	9,761	
September 28	vs. Florida A&M*	Atlanta–Fulton County Stadium; Atlanta, GA (Atlanta Football Classic)	L 7–43	49,767	
October 5	Murray State	Hale Stadium; Nashville, TN	W 28–7	4,300	
October 19	at Southeast Missouri State	Houck Stadium; Cape Girardeau, MO	L 34–37		
October 26	at Austin Peay	Municipal Stadium; Clarksville, TN	L 17–31		
November 2	No. 2 Eastern Kentucky^{†}	Hale Stadium; Nashville, TN	L 20–27	18,150	
November 9	Tennessee Tech	Hale Stadium; Nashville, TN	W 14–10		
November 16	at Southern*	A. W. Mumford Stadium; Baton Rouge, LA	W 33–14	5,225	
*Non-conference game; ^{†}Homecoming; Rankings from NCAA Division I-AA Football Committee Poll released prior to the game
