= 1993 Murray State Racers football team =

American college football season

1993 Murray State Racers football
- Conference: Ohio Valley Conference
- Record: 4–7 (4–4 OVC)
- Head coach: Houston Nutt (1st season)
- Home stadium: Roy Stewart Stadium

1993 Ohio Valley Conference football standings
	Conf.					Overall
Team	W		L		T	W		L		T
No. 17 Eastern Kentucky $^	8	–	0	–	0	8	–	4	–	0
No. 22 Tennessee Tech	7	–	1	–	0	8	–	3	–	0
Tennessee–Martin	5	–	3	–	0	6	–	5	–	0
Middle Tennessee	4	–	4	–	0	5	–	6	–	0
Murray State	4	–	4	–	0	4	–	7	–	0
Tennessee State	4	–	4	–	0	4	–	7	–	0
Morehead State	2	–	6	–	0	3	–	8	–	0
Southeast Missouri State	2	–	6	–	0	3	–	8	–	0
Austin Peay	0	–	8	–	0	1	–	10	–	0
$ – Conference champion; ^ – NCAA Division I-AA playoff participant; Rankings from The Sports Network poll

The 1993 Murray State Racers football team represented Murray State University during the 1993 NCAA Division I-AA football season as a member of the Ohio Valley Conference (OVC). Led by first-year head coach Houston Nutt, the Racers compiled an overall record of 4–7, with a mark of 4–4 in conference play, and finished fourth in the OVC.

== Schedule ==
Date	Opponent	Site	Result	Attendance	Source
September 2	Eastern Illinois*	Roy Stewart Stadium; Murray, KY	L 17–34		
September 11	at No. 1 Marshall*	Marshall University Stadium; Huntington, WV	L 3–29	21,208	
September 18	Southeast Missouri State	Roy Stewart Stadium; Murray, KY	W 17–14		
September 25	at No. 4 Middle Tennessee	Johnny "Red" Floyd Stadium; Murfreesboro, TN	L 3–45	11,500	
October 2	at Tennessee–Martin	Pacer Stadium; Martin, TN	W 28–21 ^{OT}		
October 9	Austin Peay	Roy Stewart Stadium; Murray, KY	W 38–14	8,381	
October 16	Eastern Kentucky	Roy Stewart Stadium; Murray, KY	L 13–21		
October 30	at Tennessee Tech	Tucker Stadium; Cookeville, TN	L 16–31		
November 6	Morehead State	Roy Stewart Stadium; Murray, KY	W 39–0		
November 13	at Tennessee State	Hale Stadium; Nashville, TN	L 13–26		
November 20	at No. 20 Western Kentucky*	L. T. Smith Stadium; Bowling Green, KY (rivalry)	L 14–44	4,552	
*Non-conference game; Rankings from The Sports Network Poll released prior to the game
