= 1960 Western Kentucky Hilltoppers football team =

American college football season

1960 Western Kentucky Hilltoppers football
- Conference: Ohio Valley Conference
- Record: 2–6–1 (1–4–1 OVC)
- Head coach: Nick Denes (4th season)
- Captain: Herb Wassom

1960 Ohio Valley Conference football standings
	Conf.					Overall
Team	W		L		T	W		L		T
Tennessee Tech $	6	–	0	–	0	8	–	2	–	0
Middle Tennessee	4	–	2	–	0	5	–	5	–	0
Murray State	4	–	2	–	0	5	–	5	–	0
Morehead State	2	–	4	–	0	5	–	4	–	0
East Tennessee State	1	–	3	–	2	3	–	4	–	2
Eastern Kentucky	1	–	4	–	1	3	–	6	–	1
Western Kentucky	1	–	4	–	1	2	–	6	–	1
$ – Conference champion

The 1960 Western Kentucky Hilltoppers football team represented Western Kentucky State College (now known as Western Kentucky University) as a member of the Ohio Valley Conference (OVC) during the 1960 college football season. Led by fourth-year head coach Nick Denes, the Hilltoppers compiled an overall record of 2–6–1 with a mark 1–4–1 conference play, tying for sixth place in the OVC. The team's captain was Herb Wassom.

== Schedule ==
Date	Opponent	Site	Result	Attendance	Source
September 19	Southeast Missouri State*	Bowling Green, KY	L 19–28		
September 24	at East Tennessee State	Johnson City, TN	T 7–7		
October 1	Middle Tennessee	Bowling Green, KY (rivalry)	W 20–13		
October 8	Austin Peay*	Bowling Green, KY	W 34–6		
October 15	at Tennessee Tech	Cookeville, TN	L 7–10		
October 21	at Louisville*	Fairgrounds Stadium; Louisville, KY	L 0–44	4,428	
October 29	Eastern Kentucky^{†}	Bowling Green, KY (rivalry)	L 7–17		
November 5	at Morehead State	Morehead, KY	L 6–12		
November 12	at Murray State	Cutchin Stadium; Murray, KY (rivalry)	L 7–26		
*Non-conference game; ^{†}Homecoming
