= 1993 Tennessee State Tigers football team =

American college football season

1993 Tennessee State Tigers football
- Conference: Ohio Valley Conference
- Record: 4–7 (4–4 OVC)
- Head coach: Bill Davis (1st season)
- Home stadium: Hale Stadium

1993 Ohio Valley Conference football standings
	Conf.					Overall
Team	W		L		T	W		L		T
No. 17 Eastern Kentucky $^	8	–	0	–	0	8	–	4	–	0
No. 22 Tennessee Tech	7	–	1	–	0	8	–	3	–	0
Tennessee–Martin	5	–	3	–	0	6	–	5	–	0
Middle Tennessee	4	–	4	–	0	5	–	6	–	0
Murray State	4	–	4	–	0	4	–	7	–	0
Tennessee State	4	–	4	–	0	4	–	7	–	0
Morehead State	2	–	6	–	0	3	–	8	–	0
Southeast Missouri State	2	–	6	–	0	3	–	8	–	0
Austin Peay	0	–	8	–	0	1	–	10	–	0
$ – Conference champion; ^ – NCAA Division I-AA playoff participant; Rankings from The Sports Network poll

The 1993 Tennessee State Tigers football team represented Tennessee State University as a member of the Ohio Valley Conference (OVC) during the 1993 NCAA Division I-AA football season. Led by first-year head coach Bill Davis, the Tigers compiled an overall record of 4–7, with a conference record of 4–4, and finished tied for fourth in the OVC.

== Schedule ==
Date	Opponent	Site	Result	Attendance	Source
September 4	vs. Florida A&M*	Gator Bowl Stadium; Jacksonville, FL (Gateway Classic)	L 15–23		
September 11	vs. No. 20 Jackson State*	Soldier Field; Chicago, IL (Windy City Classic)	L 18–24	43,800	
September 18	vs. Grambling State*	Liberty Bowl Memorial Stadium; Memphis, TN (Southern Heritage Classic)	L 28–33	41,669	
October 3	vs. No. 4 Middle Tennessee	Vanderbilt Stadium; Nashville, TN	W 34–33		
October 9	vs. Eastern Kentucky	Cardinal Stadium; Louisville, KY (River City Classic)	L 13–52	21,863	
October 16	at Austin Peay	Municipal Stadium; Clarksville, TN	W 21–16		
October 23	at Tennessee–Martin	Pacer Stadium; Martin, TN	L 14–21	8,110	
October 30	Morehead State^{†}	Hale Stadium; Nashville, TN	W 15–0	12,141	
November 6	Tennessee Tech	Hale Stadium; Nashville, TN	L 21–24	2,752	
November 13	Murray State	Hale Stadium; Nashville, TN	W 26–13		
November 20	at Southeast Missouri State	Houck Stadium; Cape Girardeau, MO	L 13–14		
*Non-conference game; ^{†}Homecoming; Rankings from NCAA Division I-AA Football Committee Poll released prior to the game
