= 1991 Middle Tennessee Blue Raiders football team =

American college football season

1991 Middle Tennessee Blue Raiders football

NCAA Division I-AA Quarterfinal, L 13–23 at Eastern Kentucky
- Conference: Ohio Valley Conference
- Record: 9–4 (6–1 OVC)
- Head coach: Boots Donnelly (13th season)
- Home stadium: Johnny "Red" Floyd Stadium

1991 Ohio Valley Conference football standings
	Conf.					Overall
Team	W		L		T	W		L		T
No. 2 Eastern Kentucky $^	7	–	0	–	0	12	–	2	–	0
No. 9 Middle Tennessee ^	6	–	1	–	0	9	–	4	–	0
Austin Peay	3	–	4	–	0	5	–	6	–	0
Morehead State	3	–	4	–	0	4	–	7	–	0
Southeast Missouri State	3	–	4	–	0	3	–	8	–	0
Tennessee State	2	–	5	–	0	3	–	8	–	0
Tennessee Tech	2	–	5	–	0	2	–	9	–	0
Murray State	1	–	6	–	0	3	–	8	–	0
$ – Conference champion; ^ – NCAA Division I-AA playoff participant; Rankings from NCAA Division I-AA Football Committee poll

The 1991 Middle Tennessee Blue Raiders football team represented Middle Tennessee State University as a member of the Ohio Valley Conference (OVC) during the 1991 NCAA Division I-AA football season. The team was led by 13th-year head coach Boots Donnelly and played their home games at Johnny "Red" Floyd Stadium in Murfreesboro, Tennessee. The Blue Raiders finished the season with an 9–4 record overall and a 6–1 record in conference play.

== Schedule ==
Date	Opponent	Rank	Site	Result	Attendance	Source
September 7	at Tennessee State	No. 12	Vanderbilt Stadium; Nashville, TN	W 42–6		
September 21	at No. T–3 Eastern Kentucky	No. 7	Roy Kidd Stadium; Richmond, KY	L 7–17	20,700	
September 28	Murray State	No. 16	Johnny "Red" Floyd Stadium; Murfreesboro, TN	W 35–3		
October 5	at Western Kentucky*	No. T–12	L. T. Smith Stadium; Bowling Green, KY (rivalry)	W 23-21	8,068	
October 12	at Austin Peay	No. 9	Clarksville Municipal Stadium; Clarksville, TN	W 23–8		
October 19	at No. 1 (I-A) Florida State*	No. 7	Doak Campbell Stadium; Tallahassee, FL	L 10–39	60,202	
October 26	Southeast Missouri State^{†}	No. 8	Johnny "Red" Floyd Stadium; Murfreesboro, TN	W 52–0	13,000	
October 31	Tennessee–Martin*	No. 7	Johnny "Red" Floyd Stadium; Murfreesboro, TN	W 51–14	9,500	
November 9	at Cincinnati*	No. 6	Nippert Stadium; Cincinnati, OH	L 10–30	8,761	
November 16	at Morehead State	No. 11	Jayne Stadium; Morehead, KY	W 31–3	3,100	
November 23	at Tennessee Tech	No. 9	Tucker Stadium; Cookeville, TN	W 28–10		
November 30	No. 12 Sam Houston State*	No. 9	Johnny "Red" Floyd Stadium; Murfreesboro, TN (NCAA Division I-AA First Round)	W 20–19 ^{OT}	2,000	
December 7	at No. 2 Eastern Kentucky*	No. 9	Roy Kidd Stadium; Richmond, KY (NCAA Division I-AA Quarterfinal)	L 13–23		
*Non-conference game; ^{†}Homecoming; Rankings from NCAA Division I-AA Football Committee Poll released prior to the game

== After the season ==
=== NFL draft ===
The following Blue Raiders were selected in the National Football League draft following the season.

Round	Pick	Player	Position	NFL club
6	142	Chris Burns	Defensive tackle	Cincinnati Bengals
6	144	Joe Campbell	Running back	Los Angeles Rams
