= 1993 Southeast Missouri State Indians football team =

American college football season

1993 Southeast Missouri State Indians football
- Conference: Ohio Valley Conference
- Record: 3–8 (2–6 OVC)
- Head coach: John Mumford (4th season)
- Home stadium: Houck Stadium

1993 Ohio Valley Conference football standings
	Conf.					Overall
Team	W		L		T	W		L		T
No. 17 Eastern Kentucky $^	8	–	0	–	0	8	–	4	–	0
No. 22 Tennessee Tech	7	–	1	–	0	8	–	3	–	0
Tennessee–Martin	5	–	3	–	0	6	–	5	–	0
Middle Tennessee	4	–	4	–	0	5	–	6	–	0
Murray State	4	–	4	–	0	4	–	7	–	0
Tennessee State	4	–	4	–	0	4	–	7	–	0
Morehead State	2	–	6	–	0	3	–	8	–	0
Southeast Missouri State	2	–	6	–	0	3	–	8	–	0
Austin Peay	0	–	8	–	0	1	–	10	–	0
$ – Conference champion; ^ – NCAA Division I-AA playoff participant; Rankings from The Sports Network poll

The 1993 Southeast Missouri State Indians football team represented Southeast Missouri State University as a member of the Ohio Valley Conference (OVC) during the 1993 NCAA Division I-AA football season. Led by fourth-year head coach John Mumford, the Indians compiled an overall record of 3–8, with a mark of 2–6 in conference play, and finished tied for seventh in the OVC.

== Schedule ==
Date	Opponent	Site	Result	Attendance	Source
September 4	at Southwest Missouri State*	Plaster Sports Complex; Springfield, MO	L 10–24	12,442	
September 11	Sam Houston State*	Houck Stadium; Cape Girardeau, MO	L 7–40	6,821	
September 18	at Murray State	Roy Stewart Stadium; Murray, KY	L 14–17		
September 26	at Tennessee–Martin	Pacer Stadium; Martin, TN	L 14–17		
October 2	Morehead State	Houck Stadium; Cape Girardeau, MO	L 21–23		
October 9	Tennessee Tech	Houck Stadium; Cape Girardeau, MO	L 3–24		
October 23	at No. 20 Middle Tennessee	Johnny "Red" Floyd Stadium; Murfreesboro, TN	L 10–31		
October 30	at Austin Peay	Municipal Stadium; Clarksville, TN	W 17–7	1,826	
November 6	No. 23 Eastern Kentucky^{†}	Houck Stadium; Cape Girardeau, MO	L 21–35		
November 13	Kentucky State*	Houck Stadium; Cape Girardeau, MO	W 45–14		
November 20	Tennessee State	Houck Stadium; Cape Girardeau, MO	W 14–13		
*Non-conference game; ^{†}Homecoming; Rankings from The Sports Network Poll released prior to the game
