= 1991 Austin Peay Governors football team =

American college football season

1991 Austin Peay Governors football
- Conference: Ohio Valley Conference
- Record: 5–6 (3–4 OVC)
- Head coach: Roy Gregory (1st season)
- Home stadium: Municipal Stadium

1991 Ohio Valley Conference football standings
	Conf.					Overall
Team	W		L		T	W		L		T
No. 2 Eastern Kentucky $^	7	–	0	–	0	12	–	2	–	0
No. 9 Middle Tennessee ^	6	–	1	–	0	9	–	4	–	0
Austin Peay	3	–	4	–	0	5	–	6	–	0
Morehead State	3	–	4	–	0	4	–	7	–	0
Southeast Missouri State	3	–	4	–	0	3	–	8	–	0
Tennessee State	2	–	5	–	0	3	–	8	–	0
Tennessee Tech	2	–	5	–	0	2	–	9	–	0
Murray State	1	–	6	–	0	3	–	8	–	0
$ – Conference champion; ^ – NCAA Division I-AA playoff participant; Rankings from NCAA Division I-AA Football Committee poll

The 1991 Austin Peay Governors football team represented Austin Peay State University as a member of the Ohio Valley Conference (OVC) during the 1991 NCAA Division I-AA football season. Led by first-year head coach Roy Gregory, the Governors compiled an overall record of 5–6, with a mark of 3–4 in conference play, and finished tied for third in the OVC.

== Schedule ==
Date	Opponent	Site	Result	Attendance	Source
September 7	Western Kentucky*	Municipal Stadium; Clarksville, TN	W 18–14	5,807	
September 14	Southern Illinois*	Municipal Stadium; Clarksville, TN	L 17–21	4,103	
September 21	Kentucky State*	Municipal Stadium; Clarksville, TN	W 17–6	3,281	
September 28	Southeast Missouri State	Municipal Stadium; Clarksville, TN	W 24–21	4,131	
October 12	No. 9 Middle Tennessee	Municipal Stadium; Clarksville, TN	L 8–23		
October 19	at Tennessee Tech	Tucker Stadium; Cookeville, TN	L 7–32		
October 26	Tennessee State	Municipal Stadium; Clarksville, TN	W 31–17		
November 2	at Morehead State	Jayne Stadium; Morehead, KY	L 14–33	3,000	
November 9	at Tennessee–Martin*	Pacer Stadium; Martin, TN	L 28–34		
November 16	at No. 2 Eastern Kentucky	Roy Kidd Stadium; Richmond, KY	L 0–21		
November 23	Murray State	Municipal Stadium; Clarksville, TN	W 27–9	2,876	
*Non-conference game; Rankings from NCAA Division I-AA Football Committee Poll released prior to the game
