= 1991 Morehead State Eagles football team =

American college football season

1991 Morehead State Eagles football
- Conference: Ohio Valley Conference
- Record: 4–7 (3–4 OVC)
- Head coach: Cole Proctor (2nd season)
- Home stadium: Jayne Stadium

1991 Ohio Valley Conference football standings
	Conf.					Overall
Team	W		L		T	W		L		T
No. 2 Eastern Kentucky $^	7	–	0	–	0	12	–	2	–	0
No. 9 Middle Tennessee ^	6	–	1	–	0	9	–	4	–	0
Austin Peay	3	–	4	–	0	5	–	6	–	0
Morehead State	3	–	4	–	0	4	–	7	–	0
Southeast Missouri State	3	–	4	–	0	3	–	8	–	0
Tennessee State	2	–	5	–	0	3	–	8	–	0
Tennessee Tech	2	–	5	–	0	2	–	9	–	0
Murray State	1	–	6	–	0	3	–	8	–	0
$ – Conference champion; ^ – NCAA Division I-AA playoff participant; Rankings from NCAA Division I-AA Football Committee poll

The 1991 Morehead State Eagles football team represented Morehead State University as a member of the Ohio Valley Conference (OVC) during the 1991 NCAA Division I-AA football season. Led by second-year head coach Cole Proctor, the Eagles compiled an overall record of 4–7, with a mark of 3–4 in conference play, and finished tied for third in the OVC.

== Schedule ==
Date	Opponent	Site	Result	Attendance	Source
September 7	at Samford*	Seibert Stadium; Homewood, AL	L 14–52		
September 14	at Marshall*	Marshall University Stadium; Huntington, WV	L 11–70	24,127	
September 21	at Western Kentucky*	L. T. Smith Stadium; Bowling Green, KY	L 21–48	8,180	
September 28	Tennessee–Martin*	Jayne Stadium; Morehead, KY	L 28–32		
October 5	Liberty*	Jayne Stadium; Morehead, KY	W 12–10		
October 19	at Murray State	Roy Stewart Stadium; Murray, KY	W 20–10		
October 26	Tennessee Tech	Jayne Stadium; Morehead, KY	W 21–20		
November 2	Austin Peay	Jayne Stadium; Morehead, KY	W 33–14	3,000	
November 9	at Southeast Missouri State	Houck Stadium; Cape Girardeau, MO	L 16–17		
November 16	No. 11 Middle Tennessee	Jayne Stadium; Morehead, KY	L 3–31	3,100	
November 23	at No. 2 Eastern Kentucky	Roy Kidd Stadium; Richmond, KY (rivalry)	L 10–41	10,100	
*Non-conference game; Rankings from NCAA Division I-AA Football Committee Poll released prior to the game
