= 1993 Eastern Kentucky Colonels football team =

American college football season

1993 Eastern Kentucky Colonels football

OVC champion

NCAA Division I-AA first round, L 12–14 at Georgia Southern
- Conference: Ohio Valley Conference

Ranking
- Sports Network: No. 17
- Record: 8–4 (8–0 OVC)
- Head coach: Roy Kidd (30th season)
- Home stadium: Roy Kidd Stadium

1993 Ohio Valley Conference football standings
	Conf.					Overall
Team	W		L		T	W		L		T
No. 17 Eastern Kentucky $^	8	–	0	–	0	8	–	4	–	0
No. 22 Tennessee Tech	7	–	1	–	0	8	–	3	–	0
Tennessee–Martin	5	–	3	–	0	6	–	5	–	0
Middle Tennessee	4	–	4	–	0	5	–	6	–	0
Murray State	4	–	4	–	0	4	–	7	–	0
Tennessee State	4	–	4	–	0	4	–	7	–	0
Morehead State	2	–	6	–	0	3	–	8	–	0
Southeast Missouri State	2	–	6	–	0	3	–	8	–	0
Austin Peay	0	–	8	–	0	1	–	10	–	0
$ – Conference champion; ^ – NCAA Division I-AA playoff participant; Rankings from The Sports Network poll

The 1993 Eastern Kentucky Colonels football team represented Eastern Kentucky University as a member of the Ohio Valley Conference (OVC) during the 1993 NCAA Division I-AA football season. Led by 30th-year head coach Roy Kidd, the Colonels compiled an overall record of 8–4, with a mark of 8–0 in conference play, and finished as OVC champion. Eastern Kentucky advanced to the NCAA Division I-AA playoffs and were defeated by Georgia Southern in the first round.

== Schedule ==
Date	Opponent	Rank	Site	Result	Attendance	Source
September 2	Western Kentucky*	No. 10	Roy Kidd Stadium; Richmond, KY (rivalry)	L 10–15	17,200	
September 11	at No. 6 Northeast Louisiana*	No. 18	Malone Stadium; Monroe, LA	L 14–40	20,500	
September 25	Austin Peay		Roy Kidd Stadium; Richmond, KY	W 48–7		
October 2	No. 8 Youngstown State*		Roy Kidd Stadium; Richmond, KY	L 22–26		
October 9	vs. Tennessee State		Cardinal Stadium; Louisville, KY (River City Classic)	W 52–13	21,863	
October 16	at Murray State		Roy Stewart Stadium; Murray, KY	W 21–13		
October 23	Tennessee Tech		Roy Kidd Stadium; Richmond, KY	W 10–7		
October 30	Tennessee–Martin	No. 25	Roy Kidd Stadium; Richmond, KY	W 30–0	2,500	
November 6	at Southeast Missouri State	No. 23	Houck Stadium; Cape Girardeau, MO	W 35–21		
November 13	No. 23 Middle Tennessee	No. 20	Roy Kidd Stadium; Richmond, KY	W 33–27		
November 20	at Morehead State	No. 18	Jayne Stadium; Morehead, KY (rivalry)	W 44–7		
November 27	at No. 2 Georgia Southern*	No. 17	Paulson Stadium; Statesboro, GA (NCAA Division I-AA First Round)	L 12–14	7,278	
*Non-conference game; Rankings from The Sports Network Poll released prior to the game
