= 1993 Austin Peay Governors football team =

American college football season

1993 Austin Peay Governors football
- Conference: Ohio Valley Conference
- Record: 1–10 (0–8 OVC)
- Head coach: Roy Gregory (3rd season)
- Home stadium: Municipal Stadium

1993 Ohio Valley Conference football standings
	Conf.					Overall
Team	W		L		T	W		L		T
No. 17 Eastern Kentucky $^	8	–	0	–	0	8	–	4	–	0
No. 22 Tennessee Tech	7	–	1	–	0	8	–	3	–	0
Tennessee–Martin	5	–	3	–	0	6	–	5	–	0
Middle Tennessee	4	–	4	–	0	5	–	6	–	0
Murray State	4	–	4	–	0	4	–	7	–	0
Tennessee State	4	–	4	–	0	4	–	7	–	0
Morehead State	2	–	6	–	0	3	–	8	–	0
Southeast Missouri State	2	–	6	–	0	3	–	8	–	0
Austin Peay	0	–	8	–	0	1	–	10	–	0
$ – Conference champion; ^ – NCAA Division I-AA playoff participant; Rankings from The Sports Network poll

The 1993 Austin Peay Governors football team represented Austin Peay State University as a member of the Ohio Valley Conference (OVC) during the 1993 NCAA Division I-AA football season. Led by third-year head coach Roy Gregory, the Governors compiled an overall record of 1–10, with a mark of 0–8 in conference play, and finished ninth in the OVC.

== Schedule ==
Date	Opponent	Site	Result	Attendance	Source
September 4	at Cincinnati*	Nippert Stadium; Cincinnati, OH	L 10–42	10,949	
September 11	Knoxville*	Municipal Stadium; Clarksville, TN	W 28–19	5,976	
September 18	Western Kentucky*	Municipal Stadium; Clarksville, TN	L 27–28	6,089	
September 25	at Eastern Kentucky	Roy Kidd Stadium; Richmond, KY	L 7–48		
October 2	at Tennessee Tech	Tucker Stadium; Cookeville, TN	L 17–35	2,317	
October 9	at Murray State	Roy Stewart Stadium; Murray, KY	L 14–38	8,381	
October 16	Tennessee State	Municipal Stadium; Clarksville, TN	L 16–21		
October 23	at Morehead State	Jayne Stadium; Morehead, KY	L 10–23	5,200	
October 30	Southeast Missouri State	Municipal Stadium; Clarksville, TN	L 7–17	1,826	
November 6	at Middle Tennessee	Johnny "Red" Floyd Stadium; Murfreesboro, TN	L 10–44	4,500	
November 20	Tennessee–Martin	Municipal Stadium; Clarksville, TN	L 33–39 ^{2OT}		
*Non-conference game
