= 1993 Tennessee Tech Golden Eagles football team =

American college football season

1993 Tennessee Tech Golden Eagles football
- Conference: Ohio Valley Conference

Ranking
- Sports Network: No. 22
- Record: 8–3 (7–1 OVC)
- Head coach: Jim Ragland (8th season)
- Home stadium: Tucker Stadium

1993 Ohio Valley Conference football standings
	Conf.					Overall
Team	W		L		T	W		L		T
No. 17 Eastern Kentucky $^	8	–	0	–	0	8	–	4	–	0
No. 22 Tennessee Tech	7	–	1	–	0	8	–	3	–	0
Tennessee–Martin	5	–	3	–	0	6	–	5	–	0
Middle Tennessee	4	–	4	–	0	5	–	6	–	0
Murray State	4	–	4	–	0	4	–	7	–	0
Tennessee State	4	–	4	–	0	4	–	7	–	0
Morehead State	2	–	6	–	0	3	–	8	–	0
Southeast Missouri State	2	–	6	–	0	3	–	8	–	0
Austin Peay	0	–	8	–	0	1	–	10	–	0
$ – Conference champion; ^ – NCAA Division I-AA playoff participant; Rankings from The Sports Network poll

The 1993 Tennessee Tech Golden Eagles football team represented Tennessee Technological University (commonly referred to as Tennessee Tech) as a member of the Ohio Valley Conference (OVC) during the 1993 NCAA Division I-AA football season. Led by eighth-year head coach Jim Ragland, the Golden Eagles compiled an overall record of 8–3, with a mark of 7–1 in conference play, and finished second in the OVC.

== Schedule ==
Date	Opponent	Rank	Site	Result	Attendance	Source
September 4	Illinois State*		Tucker Stadium; Cookeville, TN	L 18–23		
September 11	Lock Haven*		Tucker Stadium; Cookeville, TN	W 45–14		
September 18	at No. 15 Samford*		Seibert Stadium; Homewood, AL	L 3–30		
September 25	Morehead State		Tucker Stadium; Cookeville, TN	W 21–3		
October 2	Austin Peay		Tucker Stadium; Cookeville, TN	W 35–17	2,317	
October 9	at Southeast Missouri State		Houck Stadium; Cape Girardeau, MO	W 24–3		
October 16	Tennessee–Martin		Tucker Stadium; Cookeville, TN	W 20–3		
October 23	at Eastern Kentucky		Roy Kidd Stadium; Richmond, KY	L 7–10		
October 30	Murray State		Tucker Stadium; Cookeville, TN	W 31–16		
November 6	at Tennessee State		Hale Stadium; Nashville, TN	W 24–21	2,752	
November 20	Middle Tennessee	No. 24	Tucker Stadium; Cookeville, TN	W 35–14		
*Non-conference game; Rankings from The Sports Network Poll released prior to the game
