= 1993 Middle Tennessee Blue Raiders football team =

American college football season

1993 Middle Tennessee Blue Raiders football
- Conference: Ohio Valley Conference
- Record: 5–6 (4–4 OVC)
- Head coach: Boots Donnelly (15th season)
- Home stadium: Johnny "Red" Floyd Stadium

1993 Ohio Valley Conference football standings
	Conf.					Overall
Team	W		L		T	W		L		T
No. 17 Eastern Kentucky $^	8	–	0	–	0	8	–	4	–	0
No. 22 Tennessee Tech	7	–	1	–	0	8	–	3	–	0
Tennessee–Martin	5	–	3	–	0	6	–	5	–	0
Middle Tennessee	4	–	4	–	0	5	–	6	–	0
Murray State	4	–	4	–	0	4	–	7	–	0
Tennessee State	4	–	4	–	0	4	–	7	–	0
Morehead State	2	–	6	–	0	3	–	8	–	0
Southeast Missouri State	2	–	6	–	0	3	–	8	–	0
Austin Peay	0	–	8	–	0	1	–	10	–	0
$ – Conference champion; ^ – NCAA Division I-AA playoff participant; Rankings from The Sports Network poll

The 1993 Middle Tennessee Blue Raiders football team represented Middle Tennessee State University in the 1993 NCAA Division I-AA football season

== Schedule ==
Date	Opponent	Rank	Site	Result	Attendance	Source
September 4	at Hawaii*	No. 2	Aloha Stadium; Halawa, HI	L 14–35	41,753	
September 18	Campbellsville*	No. 6	Johnny "Red" Floyd Stadium; Murfreesboro, TN	W 70–13		
September 25	Murray State	No. 4	Johnny "Red" Floyd Stadium; Murfreesboro, TN	W 45–3	11,500	
October 2	at Tennessee State	No. 4	Vanderbilt Stadium; Nashville, TN	L 33–34		
October 9	at Tennessee–Martin	No. 10	Pacer Stadium; Martin, TN	L 14–24		
October 16	at Morehead State	No. 23	Jayne Stadium; Morehead, KY	W 45–0		
October 23	Southeast Missouri State	No. 20	Johnny "Red" Floyd Stadium; Murfreesboro, TN	W 31–10		
October 30	at Tulsa*	No. 19	Skelly Stadium; Tulsa, OK	L 17–38	17,345	
November 6	Austin Peay		Johnny "Red" Floyd Stadium; Murfreesboro, TN	W 44–10	4,500	
November 13	at No. 20 Eastern Kentucky	No. 23	Roy Kidd Stadium; Richmond, KY	L 27–33		
November 20	at No. 24 Tennessee Tech		Tucker Stadium; Cookeville, TN	L 14–35		
*Non-conference game; Rankings from The Sports Network Poll released prior to the game
