= 1991 Tennessee Tech Golden Eagles football team =

American college football season

1991 Tennessee Tech Golden Eagles football
- Conference: Ohio Valley Conference
- Record: 2–9 (2–5 OVC)
- Head coach: Jim Ragland (6th season)
- Home stadium: Tucker Stadium

1991 Ohio Valley Conference football standings
| | Conf. | | | | | Overall |
| Team | W | | L | | T | W | | L | | T |
|---|---|---|---|---|---|---|---|---|---|---|
| No. 2 Eastern Kentucky $^ | 7 | – | 0 | – | 0 | 12 | – | 2 | – | 0 |
| No. 9 Middle Tennessee ^ | 6 | – | 1 | – | 0 | 9 | – | 4 | – | 0 |
| Austin Peay | 3 | – | 4 | – | 0 | 5 | – | 6 | – | 0 |
| Morehead State | 3 | – | 4 | – | 0 | 4 | – | 7 | – | 0 |
| Southeast Missouri State | 3 | – | 4 | – | 0 | 3 | – | 8 | – | 0 |
| Tennessee State | 2 | – | 5 | – | 0 | 3 | – | 8 | – | 0 |
| Tennessee Tech | 2 | – | 5 | – | 0 | 2 | – | 9 | – | 0 |
| Murray State | 1 | – | 6 | – | 0 | 3 | – | 8 | – | 0 |
$ – Conference champion; ^ – NCAA Division I-AA playoff participant; Rankings from NCAA Division I-AA Football Committee poll

The 1991 Tennessee Tech Golden Eagles football team represented Tennessee Technological University (commonly referred to as Tennessee Tech) as a member of the Ohio Valley Conference (OVC) during the 1991 NCAA Division I-AA football season. Led by sixth-year head coach Jim Ragland, the Golden Eagles compiled an overall record of 2–9, with a mark of 2–5 in conference play, and finished tied for sixth in the OVC.

== Schedule ==
| Date | Opponent | Site | Result | Attendance | Source |
|---|---|---|---|---|---|
| September 7 | at Chattanooga* | Chamberlain Field; Chattanooga, TN | L 14–35 | 9,907 | |
| September 14 | at Ohio* | Peden Stadium; Athens, OH | L 14–35 | 11,750 | |
| September 21 | at Samford* | Seibert Stadium; Homewood, AL | L 16–20 | | |
| September 28 | No. T–3 Eastern Kentucky | Tucker Stadium; Cookeville, TN | L 13–19 | | |
| October 5 | at Tennessee–Martin* | Pacer Stadium; Martin, TN | L 16–24 | | |
| October 12 | at Southeast Missouri State | Houck Stadium; Cape Girardeau, MO | L 31–34 | | |
| October 19 | Austin Peay | Tucker Stadium; Cookeville, TN | W 32–7 | | |
| October 26 | at Morehead State | Jayne Stadium; Morehead, KY | L 20–21 | | |
| November 2 | Murray State | Tucker Stadium; Cookeville, TN | W 45–7 | | |
| November 9 | at Tennessee State | Hale Stadium; Nashville, TN | L 10–14 | | |
| November 23 | No. 9 Middle Tennessee | Tucker Stadium; Cookeville, TN | L 10–28 | | |
*Non-conference game; Rankings from NCAA Division I-AA Football Committee Poll released prior to the game
