= 1991 Murray State Racers football team =

American college football season

1991 Murray State Racers football
- Conference: Ohio Valley Conference
- Record: 3–8 (1–6 OVC)
- Head coach: Mike Mahoney (5th season)
- Home stadium: Roy Stewart Stadium

1991 Ohio Valley Conference football standings
	Conf.					Overall
Team	W		L		T	W		L		T
No. 2 Eastern Kentucky $^	7	–	0	–	0	12	–	2	–	0
No. 9 Middle Tennessee ^	6	–	1	–	0	9	–	4	–	0
Austin Peay	3	–	4	–	0	5	–	6	–	0
Morehead State	3	–	4	–	0	4	–	7	–	0
Southeast Missouri State	3	–	4	–	0	3	–	8	–	0
Tennessee State	2	–	5	–	0	3	–	8	–	0
Tennessee Tech	2	–	5	–	0	2	–	9	–	0
Murray State	1	–	6	–	0	3	–	8	–	0
$ – Conference champion; ^ – NCAA Division I-AA playoff participant; Rankings from NCAA Division I-AA Football Committee poll

The 1991 Murray State Racers football team represented Murray State University during the 1991 NCAA Division I-AA football season as a member of the Ohio Valley Conference (OVC). Led by fifth-year head coach Mike Mahoney, the Racers compiled an overall record of 3–8, with a mark of 1–6 in conference play, and finished eighth in the OVC.

== Schedule ==
Date	Opponent	Site	Result	Attendance	Source
September 7	Southern Illinois*	Roy Stewart Stadium; Murray, KY	L 27–31	6,746	
September 14	at Western Kentucky*	L. T. Smith Stadium; Bowling Green, KY (rivalry)	L 0–14	12,222	
September 21	Eastern Illinois*	Roy Stewart Stadium; Murray, KY	W 28–27	4,174	
September 28	at No. 16 Middle Tennessee	Johnny "Red" Floyd Stadium; Murfreesboro, TN	L 3–35		
October 5	at Tennessee State	Hale Stadium; Nashville, TN	L 7–28	4,300	
October 12	Tennessee–Martin*	Roy Stewart Stadium; Murray, KY	W 40–34		
October 19	Morehead State	Roy Stewart Stadium; Murray, KY	L 10–20		
November 2	at Tennessee Tech	Tucker Stadium; Cookeville, TN	L 7–45		
November 9	No. 2 Eastern Kentucky	Roy Stewart Stadium; Murray, KY	L 17–42		
November 16	Southeast Missouri State	Roy Stewart Stadium; Murray, KY	W 14–10		
November 23	at Austin Peay	Municipal Stadium; Clarksville, TN	L 9–27	2,876	
*Non-conference game; Rankings from NCAA Division I-AA Football Committee Poll released prior to the game
