= 1991 Southeast Missouri State Indians football team =

American college football season

1991 Southeast Missouri State Indians football
- Conference: Ohio Valley Conference
- Record: 3–8 (3–4 OVC)
- Head coach: John Mumford (2nd season)
- Home stadium: Houck Stadium

1991 Ohio Valley Conference football standings
	Conf.					Overall
Team	W		L		T	W		L		T
No. 2 Eastern Kentucky $^	7	–	0	–	0	12	–	2	–	0
No. 9 Middle Tennessee ^	6	–	1	–	0	9	–	4	–	0
Austin Peay	3	–	4	–	0	5	–	6	–	0
Morehead State	3	–	4	–	0	4	–	7	–	0
Southeast Missouri State	3	–	4	–	0	3	–	8	–	0
Tennessee State	2	–	5	–	0	3	–	8	–	0
Tennessee Tech	2	–	5	–	0	2	–	9	–	0
Murray State	1	–	6	–	0	3	–	8	–	0
$ – Conference champion; ^ – NCAA Division I-AA playoff participant; Rankings from NCAA Division I-AA Football Committee poll

The 1991 Southeast Missouri State Indians football team represented Southeast Missouri State University as a member of the Ohio Valley Conference (OVC) during the 1991 NCAA Division I-AA football season. Led by second-year head coach John Mumford, the Indians compiled an overall record of 3–8, with a mark of 3–4 in conference play, and finished tied for third in the OVC.

== Schedule ==
Date	Opponent	Site	Result	Attendance	Source
August 31	Southern Illinois*	Houck Stadium; Cape Girardeau, MO	L 27–28	8,265	
September 7	at Tennessee–Martin*	Pacer Stadium; Martin, TN	L 29–36		
September 14	No. 5 Eastern Kentucky	Houck Stadium; Cape Girardeau, MO	L 7–49		
September 21	at Illinois State*	Hancock Stadium; Normal, IL	L 7–42		
September 28	at Austin Peay	Municipal Stadium; Clarksville, TN	L 21–24	4,131	
October 5	Samford*	Houck Stadium; Cape Girardeau, MO	L 24–48		
October 12	Tennessee Tech	Houck Stadium; Cape Girardeau, MO	W 34–31		
October 19	Tennessee State	Houck Stadium; Cape Girardeau, MO	W 37–34		
October 26	at No. 8 Middle Tennessee	Johnny "Red" Floyd Stadium; Murfreesboro, TN	L 0–52	13,000	
November 9	Morehead State	Houck Stadium; Cape Girardeau, MO	W 17–16		
November 16	at Murray State	Roy Stewart Stadium; Murray, KY	L 10–14		
*Non-conference game; Rankings from NCAA Division I-AA Football Committee Poll released prior to the game
