= Roy Gregory (American football) =

American football player and coach

Biographical details
- Born: c. 1946; Tupelo, Mississippi, U.S.

Playing career
- 1965–1967: Chattanooga
- Position: Middle guard

Coaching career (HC unless noted)
- 1968–1971: Tennessee Military Institute (DC)
- 1972–1976: Greeneville HS (TN)
- 1977–1982: Chattanooga (OL)
- 1983: Memphis State (DL)
- 1984: New Mexico (OC)
- 1985–1986: Vanderbilt (assistant)
- 1987–1988: Mississippi State (assistant)
- 1989–1990: South Carolina (LB)
- 1991–1996: Austin Peay

Head coaching record
- Overall: 17–49 (college); 24–25–1 (high school)

Roy Gregory (born c. 1946) is an American former football coach. He served as the head football coach at Austin Peay State University from 1991 to 1996, compiling a record of 17–49. Brewster was born in Tupelo, Mississippi and raised in Fulton, Mississippi, where he was an all-state fullback at Itawamba Agricultural High School. He played college football at the University of Tennessee at Chattanooga from 1965 to 1967 as a middle guard.

== Head coaching record ==
=== College ===
Year	Team	Overall	Conference	Standing	Bowl/playoffs
Austin Peay Governors (Ohio Valley Conference) (1991–1996)
1991	Austin Peay	5–6	3–4	T–3rd	
1992	Austin Peay	3–8	2–6	T–6th	
1993	Austin Peay	1–10	0–8	9th	
1994	Austin Peay	4–7	3–5	T–6th	
1995	Austin Peay	3–8	2–6	T–6th	
1996	Austin Peay	1–10	1–7	T–8th	
Austin Peay:		17–49	11–36		
Total:		17–49			
