= 1993 Tennessee–Martin Pacers football team =

American college football season

1993 Tennessee–Martin Pacers football
- Conference: Ohio Valley Conference
- Record: 6–5 (5–3 OVC)
- Head coach: Don McLeary (8th season)
- Home stadium: Pacer Stadium

1993 Ohio Valley Conference football standings
	Conf.					Overall
Team	W		L		T	W		L		T
No. 17 Eastern Kentucky $^	8	–	0	–	0	8	–	4	–	0
No. 22 Tennessee Tech	7	–	1	–	0	8	–	3	–	0
Tennessee–Martin	5	–	3	–	0	6	–	5	–	0
Middle Tennessee	4	–	4	–	0	5	–	6	–	0
Murray State	4	–	4	–	0	4	–	7	–	0
Tennessee State	4	–	4	–	0	4	–	7	–	0
Morehead State	2	–	6	–	0	3	–	8	–	0
Southeast Missouri State	2	–	6	–	0	3	–	8	–	0
Austin Peay	0	–	8	–	0	1	–	10	–	0
$ – Conference champion; ^ – NCAA Division I-AA playoff participant; Rankings from The Sports Network poll

The 1993 Tennessee–Martin Pacers football team represented the University of Tennessee at Martin as a member of the Ohio Valley Conference (OVC) during the 1993 NCAA Division I-AA football season. Led by eighth-year head coach Don McLeary, the Pacers compiled an overall record of 6–5, with a mark of 5–3 in conference play, and finished third in the OVC.

== Schedule ==
Date	Opponent	Site	Result	Attendance	Source
September 2	Chattanooga*	Pacer Stadium; Martin, TN	L 7–26	5,847	
September 9	West Georgia*	Pacer Stadium; Martin, TN	W 26–12	3,256	
September 26	Southeast Missouri State	Pacer Stadium; Martin, TN	W 17–14		
October 2	Murray State	Pacer Stadium; Martin, TN	L 21–28 ^{OT}		
October 9	No. 10 Middle Tennessee	Pacer Stadium; Martin, TN	W 24–14		
October 16	at Tennessee Tech	Tucker Stadium; Cookeville, TN	L 3–20		
October 23	Tennessee State	Pacer Stadium; Martin, TN	W 21–14	8,110	
October 30	at No. 25 Eastern Kentucky	Roy Kidd Stadium; Richmond, KY	L 0–30	2,500	
November 6	at Samford*	Seibert Stadium; Homewood, AL	L 0–10		
November 13	at Morehead State	Jayne Stadium; Morehead, KY	W 17–0		
November 20	at Austin Peay	Municipal Stadium; Clarksville, TN	W 39–33 ^{2OT}		
*Non-conference game; Rankings from The Sports Network Poll released prior to the game
