= Keith Elias =

Former American football player (born 1972)

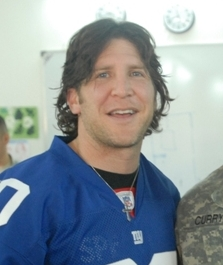
- Elias during a speaking engagement in Iraq, 2008.

No. 20, 23, 22
- Position: Running back

Personal information
- Born: February 3, 1972 (age 54); Lacey Township, New Jersey, U.S.
- Listed height: 5 ft 9 in (1.75 m)
- Listed weight: 203 lb (92 kg)

Career information
- High school: Lacey Township
- College: Princeton
- NFL draft: 1994: undrafted

Career history
- New York Giants (1994–1996); Indianapolis Colts (1998–1999); New York/New Jersey Hitmen (2001)

Awards and highlights
- Current and former NCAA FCS records; Career yards per game (140.3); Career points per game (10.7); Total rushing yards in 2 consecutive games (572); Total rushing yards in 3 consecutive games (711); Current and former Ivy League records: Career points (320); Career touchdowns (52); Single-season all-purpose yards; Career 1500-yard seasons (2)

Career NFL statistics
- Rushing yards: 124
- Rushing average: 3.0
- Receptions: 22
- Receiving yards: 147
- Return yards: 399
- Stats at Pro Football Reference

Keith Hector Elias (born February 3, 1972) is an American former professional football player who was a running back in the National Football League (NFL) and XFL. He was an All-American in high school and college where he established school, conference and national records while playing for the Princeton Tigers.

In high school, he earned All-American honors at Lacey Township High School. In college, he did so again for Princeton University, where he established 21 school records in football from 1991 through 1993. His college career coincided in the Ivy League with Jay Fiedler who led Dartmouth to three championships in that era, but Elias was able to lead Princeton to one co-championship. Elias and Fiedler split the League Player of the Year Awards during that era. He is the former National Collegiate Athletic Association (NCAA) Football Championship Subdivision (FCS, called I-AA at the time) record holder for career rushing yards per game and points per game. He also established the FCS record for back-to-back games total rushing yards. He continues to hold numerous Ivy League and Princeton Tigers rushing and scoring records.

Elias was signed as a free agent out of college by the New York Giants where he played from 1994 through 1996. He served mostly on special teams. He last played in the NFL two seasons with the Indianapolis Colts in 1998 and 1999. Elias also played for the New York/New Jersey Hitmen of the now defunct XFL.

== Early life ==
Although NFL records state that Elias was born in Lacey Township, Elias claims that he was born in Virginia Beach, Virginia. Then he says his family moved to Brooklyn before settling in New Jersey. Elias considers himself from Lacey Township, New Jersey, which is a Jersey Shore area community. Elias is the son of Nancy, a teacher and Pop Warner football coach, and Hector, a transportation consultant, and has three younger brothers.

Elias played Pop Warner football for the Lacey team, who retired his number 20. Elias rushed for 4,014 yards and scored 363 points for Lacey Township High School. As a student, he finished fifth in his graduating class of 278. As a football player, he was named an All-American by the Downtown Athletic Club. In addition to football, Elias earned two varsity letters in wrestling.

== College career ==
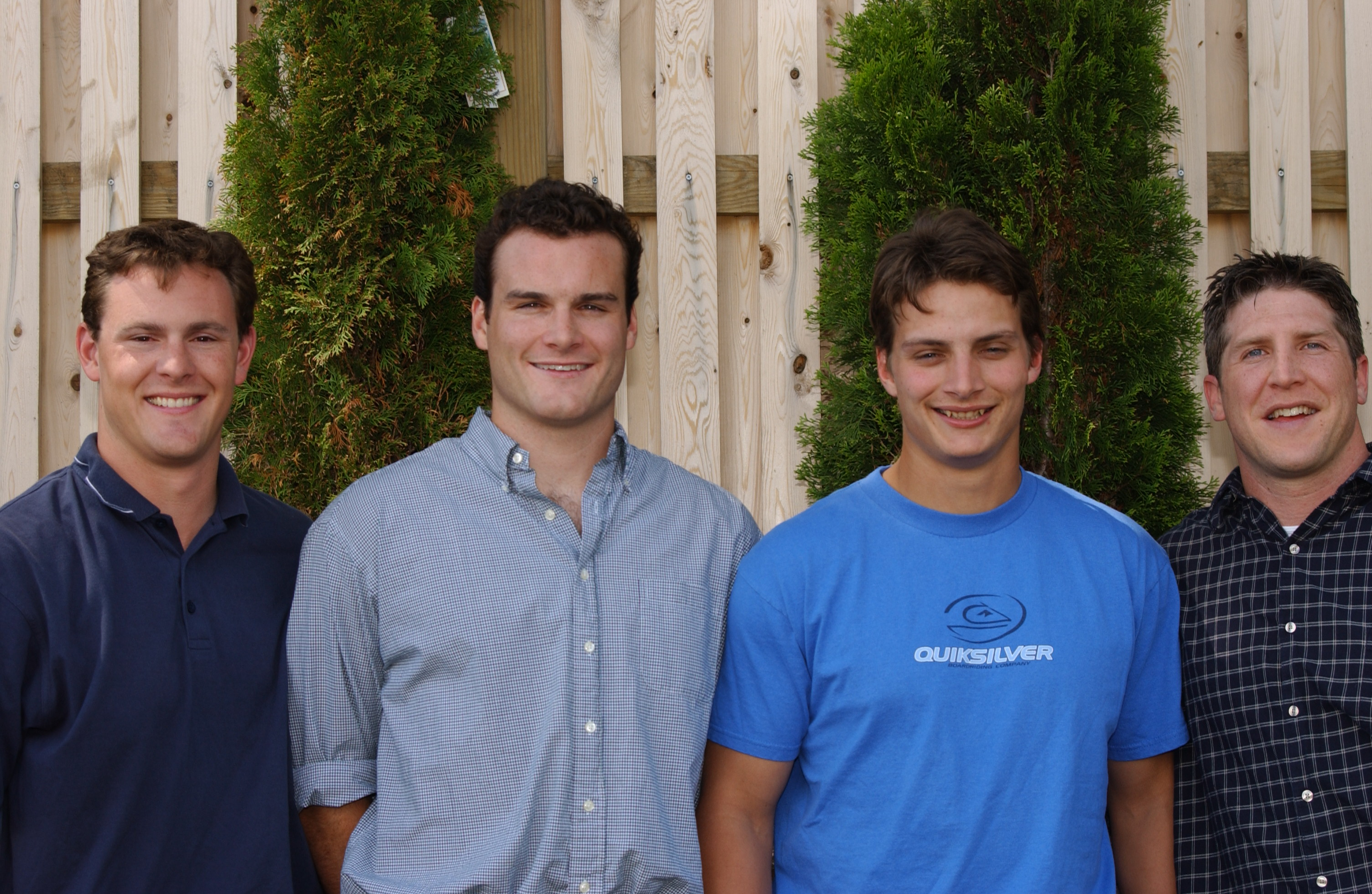
(left to right): Christian Cook, Jesse Hubbard, Trevor Tierney and Elias in 2002

=== Sophomore season (1991) ===
Elias debuted for the Princeton on the opening day of the 1991 season, which was September 21 for Princeton, with 110 yards on 18 carries. His performance was part of a shutout of the heavily favored Cornell Big Red 18–0. He earned Ivy League Rookie of the Week honors on September 23. Two weeks later on October 5, he recorded his first 200-yard game and his first three-touchdown effort in a 30–21 victory over the Colgate Red Raiders. This earned him his first Ivy League Offensive Player of the Week award. On October 19, he helped Princeton reach a 5–0 record with well over 100 yards from scrimmage and two touchdowns. He had just 67 yards rushing but had three receptions for 62 yards on one 76-yard scoring drive alone. On November 16, he had 142 yards rushing and two touchdowns in spite of two fumbles and a wrist injury against Yale to help Princeton reach a 5–1 Ivy League record as it headed towards a season-ending showdown with 5–0–1 Dartmouth. This earned him his second Ivy League Rookie of the Week award. The Tigers were defeated by a Jay Fiedler-led Dartmouth team for the Ivy League Championship the following week however. He earned second-team All-Ivy League recognition.

=== Junior season (1992) ===
Following their 1991 performance, the 1992 Tigers were Ivy League favorites. In a game that was believed to be a deciding factor in the conference championship outcome, Elias had 114 yards on opening day against Cornell in a 22–20 victory on September 19. The following week on September 26, Elias established the Princeton single-game rushing record with a 299-yard four-touchdown effort in a 38–35 victory against the Lehigh, surpassing Homer Smith's 40-year-old 273-yard record. Elias received his second Ivy League Offensive Player of the Week award after the match. Then on October 3, he rushed for 273 yards in a 44–33 victory over Lafayette. In the game, he became the first Princeton runner to post back-to-back 200-yard games and the first Princeton runner to post three career 200-yard games. He repeated as Ivy League Offensive Player of the week. After three games he led all NCAA divisions in rushing with a 228.7 yards per game average, while Marshall Faulk led Division I-A, now known as Football Bowl Subdivision, with a 209.3 average. The total of 572 yards in back-to-back games established an NCAA Division I-AA record. By rushing for 139 in the subsequent game against Brown on October 10, he tied the I-AA three-game rushing yard record of 711 yards. However, he injured his ankle and the subsequent week, he only rushed three times for two yards as Princeton fell to 4–1 by losing to Holy Cross on October 17. He was expected to be sidelined due to the injury when Princeton faced Harvard on October 24, but he rushed for 155 yards and two touchdowns, leading Princeton to a 21–6 victory and a 3–0 conference record. On October 31, he rushed for 115 yards and three touchdowns on 21 carries against Columbia. That week he surpassed Heisman Trophy-winner Dick Kazmaier for fourth place on the all-time Princeton career rushing yards list. On November 7, he rushed for 131 yards against Penn as Princeton eliminated one of its one-loss conference foes from contention. He tallied 140 yards on 20 carries as Princeton clinched a share of the Ivy League title by moving to 6–0 with a victory over Yale. In the game, he moved inherited the school single-season rushing yards record by moving his total to 1368, ahead of Judd Garrett's 1347. Despite a 207-yard two-touchdown rushing effort by Elias, Fiedler once again led Dartmouth to a season-ending victory over Princeton, this time for a share of the Ivy League championship.

Although Fiedler was named Ivy League Player of the Year, Elias was one of six other unanimous 1992 first-team All-Ivy League selections. Elias, however, was a I-AA All-American selection by organizations such as Kodak (selected by the American Football Coaches Association) and the Associated Press. His 157.5 yards per game earned him the 1992 NCAA I-AA statistical championship. Elias nicknamed his offensive line "The Beast" and called fullback Peter Bailey and tight end Chris Beiswenger, "the Killer B's". In the offense, he usually was the tailback in the I formation.

=== Senior season (1993) ===
As a senior, Elias was elected co-captain and was considered the biggest media sensation on the campus in the past several years. Princeton enjoyed a third straight season-opening victory over Cornell Big Red on September 18. After falling behind 12–0 Elias contributed a 72-yard rushing touchdown and a 67-yard receiving touchdown as part of a 188-yard rushing day (259 all purpose yards). Elias earned Ivy League Offensive Player of the Week. The following week Elias added 132 rushing yards and three touchdowns as Princeton defeated Lafayette 21–7. On October 2, Elias scored touchdowns on Princeton's first four possessions, which helped Princeton build a 31–0 lead over Holy Cross. The final score was 38–0 as Elias tallied 185 yards on 29 carries. Elias again earned Ivy League Offensive Player of the Week. On October 9, Elias broke Garrett's Princeton career rushing yard record of 3109 and his career touchdown record of 40 on a day when he rushed for 206 yards and scored two touchdowns in a 34–16 victory over Brown. On October 16, despite missing the first two offensive series due to a hip pointer injury, Elias posted his tenth consecutive 100-yard game with a 160-yard one-touchdown effort in a 31–23 victory over Lehigh, who established a Princeton opponent record by passing for 403 yards. At the midpoint of Princeton's 10-game schedule, Elias led the I-AA in rushing with a 172 yards per game average. On October 23 against Harvard, Elias rushed for 201 yards on 33 carries and ran for two touchdowns in a 21–110 victory for the undefeated Tigers. Despite his efforts he lost the I-AA rushing lead to Tony Vinson by a 177–176.7 margin. Elias responded with a 226-yard effort on October 30 against Columbia as Princeton moved to 7–0 and 4–0 in conference. The effort earned Elias his sixth and final career Ivy League Offensive Player of the Week award. The game set up a November battle of unbeatens against Penn on November 6. In the contest, Penn held Elias to just 59 yards on 15 carries, as Penn took over the Ivy League lead with a 30–14 victory. On November 13, as Princeton clung to hopes of at least a share of the Ivy League title, Elias rushed for 198 yards and three touchdowns on 39 carries in a 28–7 victory over Yale. Elias broke Garrett's 4,510-yard school career all-purpose yards record with a 4,529 total and extended his own single-season touchdowns (19) and points (116) records. On November 20, Elias rushed for 188 yards to help Princeton build a 22–8 fourth quarter lead that did not stand up to Fiedler who led Dartmouth to its third consecutive season-ending victory over Princeton. That November, Vinson set the current I-AA record for yards gained in two consecutive games (691), a record Elias had set the prior season. Vinson set the single-game and single-season rushing yards record and won the season statistical championship over Elias. Elias finished second in single-season yards per game to Vinson.

Elias beat out Fiedler and Jim McGeehan (quarterback of the undefeated Penn team) for the Asa S. Bushnell Cup as the Ivy League Player of the Year. He also repeated as an All-American selection. He was recognized as one of fifteen scholar athletes by the National Football Foundation, earning an $18,000 ($40,117 today) postgraduate scholarship. Elias retired as the NCAA FCS career recordholder in rushing yards per game (140.3) and points per game (10.7), having surpassed Mike Clark of Akron (133, 1984–86) and Joel Sigel of Portland State (9.3, 1978–80). His yardage record was surpassed in 1995 by Arnold Mickens of Butler who is the current recordholder with 190.7 yards per game. His points record was eclipsed in 1998 by Aaron Stecker, Western Illinois with an 11.7 average.

Upon the completion of his career, his name was listed atop many All-time lists in the Ivy League record book. He also retired second to Ed Marinaro in numerous categories (Career rushing yards, Ivy career rushing yards, single-season rushing yards, Single-Ivy season rushing yards, career 200-yard games, single-season 200-yard games, career rushing touchdowns, Ivy career rushing touchdowns, single-season rushing touchdowns, Ivy career points, single-season points, single Ivy season points, Ivy career touchdowns, single-season touchdowns, single-Ivy season touchdowns, career all-purpose yards). However, many of his and Marinaro's records have been surpassed. Elias surpassed Marinaro for career points and tied with him for touchdowns, but both records were bettered by Nick Hartigan. He also passed Marinaro in single-season all-purpose yards in 1993 by a 1939–1932 margin but was surpassed by Johnathan Reese in 2000. He continues to be the only Ivy Leaguer to have two 1500-yard seasons. He retired with 4 I-AA records and 21 school records including rushing (4,208 yards), rushing touchdowns (49), yards rushing per game (140.3), carries (736), carries per game (24.5), yards per carry (5.72), all-purpose yards (4,739), overall touchdowns (52) and points (320). He also retired with 21 100-yard rushing games and seven 200-yards games.

== Professional career ==
After going undrafted in the 1994 NFL draft, Elias signed with the Giants. The 1994 NFL season was the first year that rosters expanded to 53, and Elias made the roster out of training camp. He made the roster ahead of 1994 third round draft choice running back Gary Downs. That season, he was originally assigned the number 25, but he eventually took the number 20. On September 11, 1994, against the Arizona Cardinals, Elias sprained his ankle. The injury hampered him for several weeks. After two games of special team duties, he spent the remainder of the season on the inactive list. Following the season, he was left unprotected in the 1995 NFL expansion draft to stock the Carolina Panthers and Jacksonville Jaguars. When the Giants lost the second of their unprotected players in the draft they made Elias unavailable.

Entering the 1995 NFL season, Elias was not expected to make the 1995 team. However, in the first preseason game, he scored the Giants' only touchdown, and the next week he ran for 77 yards on just 12 carries; After two preseason games, he led the Giants roster of running backs that included Rodney Hampton, Herschel Walker, Kenyon Rasheed, Downs, Charles Way, and Tyrone Wheatley in rushing with 123 yards. The following week, he blocked a punt that the Giants recovered for a touchdown and scored the winning two-point conversion. After three preseason games, Elias had moved from likely to be released to almost a lock to make the team. Elias finished the preseason as the team's leading rusher with 214 yards on 37 carries and made the team. Elias again contributed on special teams, but in the first ten games, he only had ten yards on four carries. Late in the season, Elias moved into the role of the first man off the bench to spell Hampton who was the starter in place of Wheatley who had held the role early in the season. He finished the season with 10 rushes for 44 yards and 9 receptions for 69 yards. Following the season, the Giants opted to release Walker and expected to be unable to resign Hampton. That season, Elias' popularity made him one of the most sought after public speakers on the team and earned him nearly $50,000 ($105,645).

Elias entered the 1996 NFL season as the likely third down back for the 1996 team. In 1995 no one had emerged to replace Dave Meggett in that role. Elias again had strong preseason performances. In one early August exhibition game he scored two touchdowns. By August 22, he led the Giants in preseason carries. He entered the season as the first option third down back, ahead of Wheatley. In the September 30 contest against the Minnesota Vikings, John Randle picked fights with some of the Giants, including Elias. Elias suffered turf toe in that game and it affected him in the next as well. He also had an October ankle injury, which consisted of both a sprain and a bone chip. That injury kept him out of the lineup, making Wheatley the third down back by default. Elias did not get his third down role back until mid-November. When he finally returned to this role, he was able to perform as needed. However, he was soon suffering from a torn posterior cruciate ligament and a damaged meniscus in need of surgery and was lost for the season. He had immediate November surgery, which revealed that the ligament was 90% torn, but would heal on its own. It kept him out of the lineup for the rest of the season, however. He finished the season on injured reserve. During the offseason, he got involved as a narrator for the Westchester Philharmonic. As the Giants prepared for the 1997 NFL draft they attempted to resign Elias.

In 1997, he earned the Unsung hero award from the New York Giants. Elias did not play for the Giants during the 1997 NFL season, and he did not sign with the Indianapolis Colts until the 1998 NFL season. He had an offer from the 1997 Carolina Panthers, but he tested the market too long and lost it. He spent 1997 coaching his high school alma mater's football team where his brother, Greg, was playing. He was the running backs and special teams coach. After three seasons with the Giants he served as special teams captain with the Indianapolis Colts. He also served as the backup to Marshall Faulk and Edgerrin James. The Colts resigned him to a second one-year contract for the 1999 NFL season. He scored the game-winning touchdown in the final preseason game on September 2. Following the season he was arrested on charges of disorderly conduct and resisting arrest at a barroom brawl in Seaside Heights, New Jersey. His 20-year-old brothers Brian and Gregory as well as New York Jets wide receiver Wayne Chrebet were also arrested. Elias jumped on a police officer who was attempting to handcuff one of his brothers. According to The New York Times Brian Elias was engaged to Jennifer Chrebet, Wayne's sister, but the New York Daily News reported that they were married. When the case was heard in court, the three Elias brothers and Chrebet all pleaded guilty to a public nuisance violation and paid fines of $230 apiece. Chrebet pleaded guilty in absentia via a legal representative. After playing two years for the Colts on special teams, while rushing for 52 yards on 21 carries, Elias' veteran salary would not fit under the salary cap for the 2000 team. Thus, Elias did not play in the NFL during the 2000 NFL season.

In November 2000, Elias attended the minicamp of the New York/New Jersey Hitmen of the XFL who were scheduled to begin play the following February. He hoped to survive roster cuts as the team went from 70 men to a 38-man roster. Elias made the team as a backup running back. In the early season games, he saw plenty of action as a ball carrier, even though he was struggling with a knee injury. However, in March, he was placed on injured reserve. Elias hasn't participated in a season since and during the season Elias prepared for life after football by writing screenplays.

== Personal life ==
Elias is a born again Christian.
