= 1992 Fordham Rams football team =

American college football season

1992 Fordham Rams football
- Conference: Patriot League
- Record: 1–9 (1–4 Patriot)
- Head coach: Larry Glueck (7th season)
- Captains: Mark Blazejewski; Tony Iasiello & Mike Beier
- Home stadium: Coffey Field

1992 Patriot League football standings
	Conf.					Overall
Team	W		L		T	W		L		T
Lafayette $	5	–	0	–	0	8	–	3	–	0
Holy Cross	4	–	1	–	0	6	–	5	–	0
Colgate	2	–	3	–	0	4	–	7	–	0
Lehigh	2	–	3	–	0	3	–	8	–	0
Bucknell	1	–	4	–	0	4	–	7	–	0
Fordham	1	–	4	–	0	1	–	9	–	0
$ – Conference champion

The 1992 Fordham Rams football team was an American football team that represented Fordham University during the 1992 NCAA Division I-AA football season. Fordham tied for last in the Patriot League.

In their seventh year under head coach Larry Glueck, the Rams compiled a 1–9 record. Mark Blazejewski and Tony Iasiello were the team captains.

The Rams were outscored 222 to 141. Their 1–4 conference record tied for fifth the six-team Patriot League standings—their best result yet in three years of league play. Fordham's sole victory of 1992, over fellow cellar-dweller Bucknell, was its first Patriot League conference win since joining the league in 1990.

Fordham played its home games at Jack Coffey Field on the university's Rose Hill campus in The Bronx, in New York City.

== Schedule ==
Date	Opponent	Site	Result	Attendance	Source
September 12	at Lehigh	Goodman Stadium; Bethlehem, PA	L 14–16	11,822	
September 19	Colgate	Coffey Field; Bronx, NY	L 7–17		
September 26	Columbia*	Coffey Field; Bronx, NY (rivalry)	L 7–17	3,521	
October 3	Penn*	Coffey Field; Bronx, NY	L 10–13	4,933	
October 10	at Yale*	Yale Bowl; New Haven, CT	L 12–31	11,264	
October 16	at Hofstra*	Hofstra Stadium; Hempstead, NY	L 20–31		
October 24	Lafayette	Coffey Field; Bronx, NY	L 21–44	4,101	
October 31	at Bucknell	Christy Mathewson–Memorial Stadium; Lewisburg, PA	W 21–0	6,000	
November 14	at No. 8 Villanova*	Villanova Stadium; Villanova, PA	L 14–31	9,567	
November 21	at Holy Cross	Fitton Field; Worcester, MA	L 13–21	7,242	
*Non-conference game; Rankings from NCAA Division I-AA Football Committee Poll released prior to the game
