= 1993 Bucknell Bison football team =

American college football season

1993 Bucknell Bison football
- Conference: Patriot League
- Record: 4–7 (3–2 Patriot)
- Head coach: Lou Maranzana (5th season)
- Captains: Cecil Boone; Travis Kopp; Russ Strohecker; Dan Zappa
- Home stadium: Christy Mathewson–Memorial Stadium

1993 Patriot League football standings
| | Conf. | | | | | Overall |
| Team | W | | L | | T | W | | L | | T |
|---|---|---|---|---|---|---|---|---|---|---|
| Lehigh $ | 4 | – | 1 | – | 0 | 7 | – | 4 | – | 0 |
| Lafayette | 3 | – | 1 | – | 1 | 5 | – | 4 | – | 2 |
| Bucknell | 3 | – | 2 | – | 0 | 4 | – | 7 | – | 0 |
| Holy Cross | 2 | – | 3 | – | 0 | 3 | – | 8 | – | 0 |
| Colgate | 1 | – | 3 | – | 1 | 3 | – | 7 | – | 1 |
| Fordham | 1 | – | 4 | – | 0 | 1 | – | 10 | – | 0 |
$ – Conference champion

The 1993 Bucknell Bison football team was an American football team that represented Bucknell University during the 1993 NCAA Division I-AA football season. It finished third in the Patriot League.

Bucknell played its home games at Christy Mathewson–Memorial Stadium on the university campus in Lewisburg, Pennsylvania.

During its fifth year under head coach Lou Maranzana, the Bison compiled a 4–7 record. Cecil Boone, Travis Kopp, Russ Strohecker and Dan Zappa were the team captains.

Bucknell's team was outscored 302 to 193. Its 3–2 conference record placed it third in the six-team Patriot League standings.

== Schedule ==
| Date | Opponent | Site | Result | Attendance | Source |
|---|---|---|---|---|---|
| September 4 | Bloomsburg* | Christy Mathewson–Memorial Stadium; Lewisburg, PA | W 21–16 | 4,557 | |
| September 11 | at Lafayette | Fisher Field; Easton, PA | L 14–31 | 4,833 | |
| September 25 | Penn* | Christy Mathewson–Memorial Stadium; Lewisburg, PA | L 12–42 | 5,758 | |
| October 2 | Dartmouth^* | Christy Mathewson–Memorial Stadium; Lewisburg, PA | L 13–31 | 7,858 | |
| October 9 | at Hofstra* | Hofstra Stadium; Hempstead, NY | L 0–28 | 4,127 | |
| October 16 | at Brown* | Brown Stadium; Providence, RI | L 12–21 | 3,653 | |
| October 23 | Holy Cross^{†} | Christy Mathewson–Memorial Stadium; Lewisburg, PA | W 33–23 | 6,021 | |
| October 30 | at Fordham | Coffey Field; Bronx, NY | W 27–21 | 2,211 | |
| November 6 | Lehigh | Christy Mathewson–Memorial Stadium; Lewisburg, PA | W 32–27 | 5,255 | |
| November 13 | at Towson State* | Minnegan Stadium; Towson, MD | L 21–49 | 2,109 | |
| November 20 | at Colgate | Andy Kerr Stadium; Hamilton, NY | L 8–13 | 1,200 | |
*Non-conference game; ^{†}Homecoming; ^ Parents Weekend
