= 1993 William & Mary Tribe football team =

American college football season

1993 William & Mary Tribe football

Yankee Mid-Atlantic Division champion

NCAA Division I-AA First Round, L 28–34 at McNeese State
- Conference: Yankee Conference
- Mid-Atlantic Division

Ranking
- Sports Network: No. 10
- Record: 9–3 (7–1 Yankee)
- Head coach: Jimmye Laycock (14th season)
- Offensive coordinator: Zbig Kepa (1st season)
- Defensive coordinator: Joe Bottiglieri (3rd season)
- Captains: Todd Durkin; Eric Lambert; Craig Staub; Tom Walters
- Home stadium: Zable Stadium

1993 Yankee Conference football standings
	Conf.					Overall
Team	W		L		T	W		L		T
New England Division
No. 6 Boston University x$^	8	–	0	–	0	12	–	1	–	0
No. 25 UMass	6	–	2	–	0	9	–	2	–	0
Connecticut	5	–	3	–	0	6	–	5	–	0
New Hampshire	4	–	4	–	0	6	–	5	–	0
Rhode Island	2	–	6	–	0	4	–	7	–	0
Maine	0	–	8	–	0	0	–	11	–	0
Mid-Atlantic Division
No. 10 William & Mary x^	7	–	1	–	0	9	–	3	–	0
No. 18 Delaware ^	6	–	2	–	0	9	–	4	–	0
James Madison	4	–	4	–	0	6	–	5	–	0
Richmond	3	–	5	–	0	5	–	6	–	0
Northeastern	2	–	6	–	0	2	–	9	–	0
Villanova	1	–	7	–	0	3	–	8	–	0
$ – Conference champion; x – Division champion/co-champions; ^ – NCAA Division I-AA playoff participant; Rankings from The Sports Network poll

The 1993 William & Mary Tribe football team represented the College of William & Mary as member of the Mid-Atlantic Division of the Yankee Conference during the 1993 NCAA Division I-AA football season. Led by Jimmye Laycock in his 14th year as head coach, William & Mary finished the season with an overall record of 9–3 and a mark of 7–1 in Yankee Conference play, winning the Mid-Atlantic Division title. They were ranked No. 10 in the final Sports Network poll. The Tribe qualified for the NCAA Division I-AA playoffs, losing in the first round before to McNeese State.

== Schedule ==
Date	Opponent	Rank	Site	Result	Attendance	Source
September 4	New Hampshire	No. 15	Zable Stadium; Williamsburg, VA	W 27–14	6,641	
September 11	at No. 3 Delaware	No. 11	Delaware Stadium; Newark, DE (rivalry)	L 35–42	13,612	
September 18	at Tulane*	No. 17	Louisiana Superdome; New Orleans, LA	L 0–10	20,517	
September 25	Harvard*	No. 20	Zable Stadium; Williamsburg, VA	W 45–17	14,314	
October 2	vs. VMI*	No. 18	Foreman Field; Norfolk, VA (Oyster Bowl, rivalry)	W 49–6	14,000	
October 16	at Northeastern	No. 17	Parsons Field; Brookline, MA	W 53–6	4,200	
October 23	Villanova	No. 17	Zable Stadium; Williamsburg, Virginia	W 51–17	17,616	
October 30	James Madison	No. 13	Zable Stadium; Williamsburg, VA (rivalry)	W 31–26	11,698	
November 6	at Maine	No. 11	Alumni Stadium; Orono, ME	W 47–23	3,400	
November 13	at No. 21 UMass	No. 10	Warren McGuirk Alumni Stadium; Hadley, MA	W 45–28	3,222	
November 20	Richmond	No. 10	Zable Stadium; Williamsburg, VA (I-64 Bowl)	W 31–17	12,110	
November 27	at No. 5 McNeese State*	No. 10	Cowboy Stadium; Lake Charles, LA (NCAA Division I-AA First Round)	L 28–34	17,167	
*Non-conference game; Rankings from The Sports Network Poll released prior to the game
