= 1992 Bucknell Bison football team =

American college football season

1992 Bucknell Bison football
- Conference: Patriot League
- Record: 4–7 (1–4 Patriot)
- Head coach: Lou Maranzana (4th season)
- Captains: David Berardinelli; John Lusk; Eric Rutter
- Home stadium: Christy Mathewson–Memorial Stadium

1992 Patriot League football standings
	Conf.					Overall
Team	W		L		T	W		L		T
Lafayette $	5	–	0	–	0	8	–	3	–	0
Holy Cross	4	–	1	–	0	6	–	5	–	0
Colgate	2	–	3	–	0	4	–	7	–	0
Lehigh	2	–	3	–	0	3	–	8	–	0
Bucknell	1	–	4	–	0	4	–	7	–	0
Fordham	1	–	4	–	0	1	–	9	–	0
$ – Conference champion

The 1992 Bucknell Bison football team was an American football team that represented Bucknell University during the 1992 NCAA Division I-AA football season. It tied for last in the Patriot League.

Bucknell played its home games at Christy Mathewson–Memorial Stadium on the university campus in Lewisburg, Pennsylvania.

In its fourth year under head coach Lou Maranzana, the Bison compiled a 7–4 record. David Berardinelli, John Lusk and Eric Rutter were the team captains.

The Bison were outscored 318 to 201. Their 1–4 conference record tied for fifth (and worst) in the six-team Patriot League standings.

== Schedule ==
Date	Opponent	Site	Result	Attendance	Source
September 5	Bloomsburg*	Christy Mathewson–Memorial Stadium; Lewisburg, PA	W 41–24	5,861	
September 12	at No. 6 Villanova*	Villanova Stadium; Villanova, PA	L 0–34	6,947	
September 19	at Towson State*	Minnegan Stadium; Towson, MD	L 21–24	2,125	
September 26	at Brown^{†}*	Christy Mathewson–Memorial Stadium; Lewisburg, PA	W 33–14	5,582	
October 3	at Dartmouth*	Memorial Field; Hanover, NH	L 14–44	3,803	
October 10	at Columbia*	Wien Stadium; New York, NY	W 29–22	5,835	
October 24	at Holy Cross	Fitton Field; Worcester, MA	L 12–27	12,401	
October 31	Fordham^	Christy Mathewson–Memorial Stadium; Lewisburg, PA	L 0–21	6,000	
November 7	at Lehigh	Goodman Stadium; Bethlehem, PA	L 16–38	8,373	
November 14	Lafayette	Christy Mathewson–Memorial Stadium; Lewisburg, PA	L 7–49		
November 21	Colgate	Christy Mathewson–Memorial Stadium; Lewisburg, PA	W 28–21	1,096	
*Non-conference game; ^{†}Homecoming; ^ Parents Weekend; Rankings from NCAA Division I-AA Football Committee Poll released prior to the game
