= 1993 UMass Minutemen football team =

American college football season

1993 UMass Minutemen football
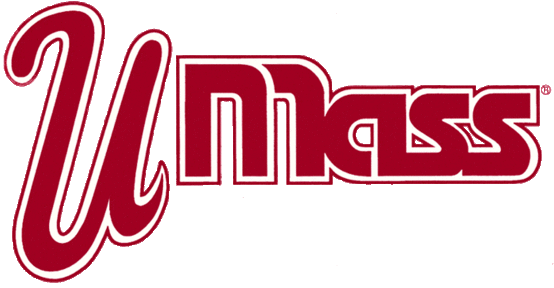
- Conference: Yankee Conference

Ranking
- Sports Network: No. 25
- Record: 8–3 (5–3 Yankee)
- Head coach: Mike Hodges (2nd season)
- Home stadium: McGuirk Stadium

1993 Yankee Conference football standings
	Conf.					Overall
Team	W		L		T	W		L		T
New England Division
No. 6 Boston University x$^	8	–	0	–	0	12	–	1	–	0
No. 25 UMass	6	–	2	–	0	9	–	2	–	0
Connecticut	5	–	3	–	0	6	–	5	–	0
New Hampshire	4	–	4	–	0	6	–	5	–	0
Rhode Island	2	–	6	–	0	4	–	7	–	0
Maine	0	–	8	–	0	0	–	11	–	0
Mid-Atlantic Division
No. 10 William & Mary x^	7	–	1	–	0	9	–	3	–	0
No. 18 Delaware ^	6	–	2	–	0	9	–	4	–	0
James Madison	4	–	4	–	0	6	–	5	–	0
Richmond	3	–	5	–	0	5	–	6	–	0
Northeastern	2	–	6	–	0	2	–	9	–	0
Villanova	1	–	7	–	0	3	–	8	–	0
$ – Conference champion; x – Division champion/co-champions; ^ – NCAA Division I-AA playoff participant; Rankings from The Sports Network poll

The 1993 UMass Minutemen football team represented the University of Massachusetts Amherst in the 1993 NCAA Division I-AA football season as a member of the Yankee Conference. The team was coached by Mike Hodges and played its home games at McGuirk Stadium in Hadley, Massachusetts. UMass finished the season with a record of 8–3 overall and 5–3 in conference play.

The matchup with rival Rhode Island was originally scheduled to be played as the Emerald Isle Classic at Fitzgerald Stadium in Killarney, Ireland. In August the game was relocated from Ireland to McGuirk Stadium in Hadley after it was determined the game would be a financial loss for each school.

== Schedule ==
Date	Opponent	Rank	Site	Result	Attendance	Source
September 11	Holy Cross*		McGuirk Stadium; Hadley, MA	W 37–7	12,887	
September 18	at Maine	No. 25	Alumni Stadium; Orono, ME	L 13–17	7,924	
September 25	at Boston University		Nickerson Field; Boston, MA	L 9–28	7,508	
October 2	James Madison*		McGuirk Stadium; Hadley, MA	W 33–10	14,207	
October 9	Rhode Island		McGuirk Stadium; Hadley, MA	W 36–14	5,124	
October 16	at Connecticut		Memorial Stadium; Storrs, CT (rivalry)	W 20–17	12,001	
October 23	No. 7 Delaware		McGuirk Stadium; Hadley, MA	W 43–29	13,102	
October 30	at Northeastern		Parsons Field; Brookline, MA	W 21–17	5,500	
November 6	Richmond*	No. 25	McGuirk Stadium; Hadley, MA	W 29–24	5,139	
November 13	No. 10 William & Mary	No. 21	McGuirk Stadium; Hadley, MA	L 28–45	3,222	
November 20	New Hampshire		McGuirk Stadium; Hadley, MA (rivalry)	W 15–13	4,712	
*Non-conference game; Rankings from The Sports Network Poll released prior to the game
