= 1993 Fordham Rams football team =

American college football season

1993 Fordham Rams football
- Conference: Patriot League
- Record: 1–10 (1–4 Patriot)
- Head coach: Larry Glueck (8th season)
- Captains: Mike Costanzo; John Strauss
- Home stadium: Coffey Field

1993 Patriot League football standings
	Conf.					Overall
Team	W		L		T	W		L		T
Lehigh $	4	–	1	–	0	7	–	4	–	0
Lafayette	3	–	1	–	1	5	–	4	–	2
Bucknell	3	–	2	–	0	4	–	7	–	0
Holy Cross	2	–	3	–	0	3	–	8	–	0
Colgate	1	–	3	–	1	3	–	7	–	1
Fordham	1	–	4	–	0	1	–	10	–	0
$ – Conference champion

The 1993 Fordham Rams football team was an American football team that represented Fordham University during the 1993 NCAA Division I-AA football season. For the fourth straight year, Fordham finished last in the Patriot League.

In their eighth and final year under head coach Larry Glueck, the Rams compiled a 1–10 record. Mike Costanzo and John Strauss were the team captains.

The Rams were outscored 315 to 145. Their 1–4 conference record placed last in the six-team Patriot League standings.

Fordham played its home games at Jack Coffey Field on the university's Rose Hill campus in The Bronx, in New York City.

== Schedule ==
Date	Opponent	Site	Result	Attendance	Source
September 11	Lehigh	Coffey Field; Bronx, NY	L 6–24	3,580	
September 18	at Villanova*	Villanova Stadium; Villanova, PA	L 5–25	8,123	
September 25	at Columbia*	Wien Stadium; New York, NY (rivalry)	L 0–7	3,325	
October 2	at Penn*	Franklin Field; Philadelphia, PA	L 30–34	10,529	
October 9	Buffalo*	Coffey Field; Bronx, NY	L 14–33	3,080	
October 16	at Cornell*	Schoellkopf Field; Ithaca, NY	L 6–48	7,517	
October 23	at Lafayette	Fisher Field; Easton, PA	L 12–27	8,712	
October 30	Bucknell	Coffey Field; Bronx, NY	L 21–27	2,211	
November 6	Colgate	Coffey Field; Bronx, NY	W 17–13	3,122	
November 13	Hofstra*	Coffey Field; Bronx, NY	L 22–49	1,967	
November 20	at Holy Cross	Fitton Field; Worcester, MA	L 12–28	3,981	
*Non-conference game

== Roster ==
1993 Fordham Rams football team roster
Players
Coaches
Offense

Pos.	#	Name	Class
WR	80	Ryan Bathan	So
OT	76	Rob Birk	Sr
G	60	Steve Borys	So
WR	5	Clavin Hargrove	Jr
TE	89	Cory Harper	Sr
WR	10	Shawn Harris	Sr
G	78	David Kniese	Jr
FB	48	Adam Lang	Sr
OT	74	Nate Mancuso	Sr
G	62	Brian McDonough	Sr
WR	82	Randy McKee	Sr
OT	70	Noah Melnick	So
C	68	Mark Mooney	Sr
QB	12	Joe Moorhead	So
OT	72	Scott Novak	So
G	66	Mike O'Brien	Jr
C	51	Neil Penttinen	Sr
QB	14	John Pohlman	Jr
RB	47	Chris Ross	Jr
TE	88	John Strauss	Sr
RB	21	Darren Wallace	Jr
FB	44	Randy Zingo	So

Defense

Pos.	#	Name	Class
FS	17	Chris Angelillo	Jr
LB	50	Jim Ciarlante	So
LB	45	Mike Costanzo	Sr
LB	55	Aaron Dougherty	Sr
DE	94	Mike Dougherty	Sr
DE	34	Jason Jacobs	Sr
CB	41	Tim Kilbride	Jr
DT	63	Tony Manno	Sr
LB	52	Mike Montanari	Jr
DT	69	Mark Myers	Jr
SS	25	Walt Novak	Sr
SS	22	Chris O'Leary	So
LB	35	Maurice O'Shea	Jr
FS	36	Steve Pietrowiez	So
LB	93	Ryan Reinert	Sr
CB	13	Won Kyu Rim	So
DE	85	Jeff Rupp	Jr
DT	99	Chris Shaw	Jr
DE	95	Aaron Torgler	Jr
CB	1	Brian Weick	Jr
DT	53	Tom Wickersham	Sr
CB	29	Mike Wilt	Sr

Special teams

Pos.	#	Name	Class

Head coach

- Larry Glueck

Coordinators/assistant coaches

Legend

- (C) Team captain
- (S) Suspended
- (I) Ineligible
- Injured
- Redshirt
