= 1993 Lehigh Engineers football team =

American college football season

1993 Lehigh Engineers football

Patriot League champion
- Conference: Patriot League
- Record: 7–4 (4–1 Patriot)
- Head coach: Hank Small (8th season)
- Captains: Dave Cecchini; Lance Haynes
- Home stadium: Goodman Stadium

1993 Patriot League football standings
	Conf.					Overall
Team	W		L		T	W		L		T
Lehigh $	4	–	1	–	0	7	–	4	–	0
Lafayette	3	–	1	–	1	5	–	4	–	2
Bucknell	3	–	2	–	0	4	–	7	–	0
Holy Cross	2	–	3	–	0	3	–	8	–	0
Colgate	1	–	3	–	1	3	–	7	–	1
Fordham	1	–	4	–	0	1	–	10	–	0
$ – Conference champion

The 1993 Lehigh Engineers football team was an American football team that represented Lehigh University during the 1993 NCAA Division I-AA football season. Lehigh won the Patriot League championship.

In their eighth and final year under head coach Hank Small, the Engineers compiled a 7–4 record. Lance Haynes and Dave Cecchini were the team captains.

Despite their winning record and league championship, the Engineers were outscored by opponents 336 to 309. Lehigh's 4–1 conference record nonetheless topped the six-team Patriot League standings.

The championship was Lehigh's first in the eight-year history of the Patriot and Colonial leagues. Patriot League rules at the time prohibited members from participating in the postseason tournament. Lehigh was not ranked in the national poll; three of its four losses were to ranked opponents.

Lehigh played its home games at Goodman Stadium on the university's Goodman Campus in Bethlehem, Pennsylvania.

== Schedule ==
Date	Opponent	Site	Result	Attendance	Source
September 4	at No. 5 Delaware*	Delaware Stadium; Newark, DE (rivalry)	L 21–62	14,007	
September 11	at Fordham*	Coffey Field; Bronx, NY	W 24–6	3,580	
September 18	Hofstra*	Goodman Stadium; Bethlehem, PA	W 31–24	5,820	
September 25	Brown*	Goodman Stadium; Bethlehem, PA	W 42–35	9,264	
October 2	Cornell*	Goodman Stadium; Bethlehem, PA	W 35–13	14,400	
October 16	at No. 24 Princeton*	Palmer Stadium; Princeton, NJ	L 23–31	11,120	
October 23	at Colgate	Andy Kerr Stadium; Hamilton, NY	W 36–32	4,000	
October 30	Holy Cross	Goodman Stadium; Bethlehem, PA	W 17–10	5,431	
November 6	at Bucknell	Christy Mathewson–Memorial Stadium; Lewisburg, PA	L 27–32	5,255	
November 13	at No. 11 Idaho*	Kibbie Dome; Moscow, ID	L 14–77	12,132	
November 20	Lafayette	Goodman Stadium; Bethlehem, PA (The Rivalry)	W 39–14	15,412	
*Non-conference game; Rankings from The Sports Network Poll released prior to the game
