= 1993 New Hampshire Wildcats football team =

American college football season

1993 New Hampshire Wildcats football
- Conference: Yankee Conference
- New England Division
- Record: 6–5 (4–4 Yankee)
- Head coach: Bill Bowes (22nd season)
- Home stadium: Cowell Stadium

1993 Yankee Conference football standings
	Conf.					Overall
Team	W		L		T	W		L		T
New England Division
No. 6 Boston University x$^	8	–	0	–	0	12	–	1	–	0
No. 25 UMass	6	–	2	–	0	9	–	2	–	0
Connecticut	5	–	3	–	0	6	–	5	–	0
New Hampshire	4	–	4	–	0	6	–	5	–	0
Rhode Island	2	–	6	–	0	4	–	7	–	0
Maine	0	–	8	–	0	0	–	11	–	0
Mid-Atlantic Division
No. 10 William & Mary x^	7	–	1	–	0	9	–	3	–	0
No. 18 Delaware ^	6	–	2	–	0	9	–	4	–	0
James Madison	4	–	4	–	0	6	–	5	–	0
Richmond	3	–	5	–	0	5	–	6	–	0
Northeastern	2	–	6	–	0	2	–	9	–	0
Villanova	1	–	7	–	0	3	–	8	–	0
$ – Conference champion; x – Division champion/co-champions; ^ – NCAA Division I-AA playoff participant; Rankings from The Sports Network poll

The 1993 New Hampshire Wildcats football team was an American football team that represented the University of New Hampshire as a member of the New England Division of the Yankee Conference during the 1993 NCAA Division I-AA football season. In its 22nd year under head coach Bill Bowes, the team compiled a 6–5 record (4–4 against conference opponents) and finished in fourth place in the New England Division.

== Schedule ==
Date	Opponent	Site	Result	Attendance	Source
September 4	at No. 15 William & Mary	Zable Stadium; Williamsburg, VA	L 14–27	6,641	
September 11	at Connecticut	Memorial Stadium; Storrs, CT	L 23–24 ^{OT}	8,117	
September 18	No. 9 Richmond	Cowell Stadium; Durham, NH	W 31–20	5,122	
September 25	Maine	Cowell Stadium; Durham, NH (rivalry)	W 63–13		
October 9	at Dartmouth*	Cowell Stadium; Durham, NH (rivalry)	W 14–7	6,309	
October 16	at James Madison	Bridgeforth Stadium; Harrisonburg, VA	L 21–45	13,000	
October 23	Northeastern	Cowell Stadium; Durham, NH	W 21–6		
October 30	No. 10 Boston University	Cowell Stadium; Durham, NH	L 14–24		
November 6	at Villanova	Villanova Stadium; Villanova, PA	W 45–14	5,632	
November 13	Rhode Island	Cowell Stadium; Durham, NH	W 51–33	4,347	
November 20	at UMass	McGuirk Stadium; Hadley, MA (rivalry)	L 13–15	4,712	
*Non-conference game; Rankings from The Sports Network Poll released prior to the game
