= 1992 Colgate Red Raiders football team =

American college football season

1992 Colgate Red Raiders football
- Conference: Patriot League
- Record: 4–7 (2–3 Patriot)
- Head coach: Michael Foley (5th season)
- Captains: T. J. Donahue; Joe Napoli
- Home stadium: Andy Kerr Stadium

1992 Patriot League football standings
	Conf.					Overall
Team	W		L		T	W		L		T
Lafayette $	5	–	0	–	0	8	–	3	–	0
Holy Cross	4	–	1	–	0	6	–	5	–	0
Colgate	2	–	3	–	0	4	–	7	–	0
Lehigh	2	–	3	–	0	3	–	8	–	0
Bucknell	1	–	4	–	0	4	–	7	–	0
Fordham	1	–	4	–	0	1	–	9	–	0
$ – Conference champion

The 1992 Colgate Red Raiders football team was an American football team that represented Colgate University during the 1992 NCAA Division I-AA football season. Colgate tied for third in the Patriot League.

In its fifth and final season under head coach Michael Foley, the team compiled a 4–7 record. T. J. Donahue and Joe Napoli were the team captains.

The Red Raiders outscored opponents 287 to 199. Their 2–3 conference record tied for third place in the six-team Patriot League standings.

The team played its home games at Andy Kerr Stadium in Hamilton, New York.

== Schedule ==
Date	Opponent	Site	Result	Attendance	Source
September 12	at Rutgers*	Rutgers Stadium; Piscataway, NJ	L 0–41	20,096	
September 19	at Fordham	Coffey Field; Bronx, NY	W 17–7		
September 26	at Penn*	Franklin Field; Philadelphia, PA	L 0–24	8,933	
October 3	at Columbia*	Wien Stadium; New York, NY	W 34–29	4,645	
October 10	Buffalo*	Andy Kerr Stadium; Hamilton, NY	W 35–21	4,950	
October 17	Cornell*	Andy Kerr Stadium; Hamilton, NY (rivalry)	L 7–25	3,500	
October 24	at Lehigh	Goodman Stadium; Bethlehem, PA	W 14–13	11,232	
October 31	Lafayette	Andy Kerr Stadium; Hamilton, NY	L 28–37		
November 7	No. 17 William & Mary*	Andy Kerr Stadium; Hamilton, NY	L 26–44	850	
November 14	Holy Cross	Andy Kerr Stadium; Hamilton, NY	L 17–18	1,300	
November 21	at Bucknell	Christy Mathewson–Memorial Stadium; Lewisburg, PA	L 21–28	1,096	
*Non-conference game; Rankings from NCAA Division I-AA Football Committee Poll released prior to the game
