= 1993 Northeastern Huskies football team =

American college football season

1993 Northeastern Huskies football
- Conference: Yankee Conference
- Mid-Atlantic Division
- Record: 2–9 (2–6 Yankee)
- Head coach: Barry Gallup (3rd season)
- Home stadium: Parsons Field

1993 Yankee Conference football standings
	Conf.					Overall
Team	W		L		T	W		L		T
New England Division
No. 6 Boston University x$^	8	–	0	–	0	12	–	1	–	0
No. 25 UMass	6	–	2	–	0	9	–	2	–	0
Connecticut	5	–	3	–	0	6	–	5	–	0
New Hampshire	4	–	4	–	0	6	–	5	–	0
Rhode Island	2	–	6	–	0	4	–	7	–	0
Maine	0	–	8	–	0	0	–	11	–	0
Mid-Atlantic Division
No. 10 William & Mary x^	7	–	1	–	0	9	–	3	–	0
No. 18 Delaware ^	6	–	2	–	0	9	–	4	–	0
James Madison	4	–	4	–	0	6	–	5	–	0
Richmond	3	–	5	–	0	5	–	6	–	0
Northeastern	2	–	6	–	0	2	–	9	–	0
Villanova	1	–	7	–	0	3	–	8	–	0
$ – Conference champion; x – Division champion/co-champions; ^ – NCAA Division I-AA playoff participant; Rankings from The Sports Network poll

The 1993 Northeastern Huskies football team was an American football team that represented Northeastern University as a member of the Yankee Conference during the 1993 NCAA Division I-AA football season. Led by third-year head coach Barry Gallup, the team compiled an overall record of 2–9, with a mark of 2–6 in conference play, and placed fifth in the Mid-Atlantic Division.

== Schedule ==
Date	Opponent	Site	Result	Attendance	Source
September 10	at Villanova	Villanova Stadium; Villanova, PA	W 27–3	6,794	
September 18	at Boise State*	Bronco Stadium; Boise, ID	L 13–27	17,355	
September 25	at Rhode Island	Meade Stadium; Kingston, RI	L 13–15	3,133	
October 2	at No. 15 Richmond	UR Stadium; Richmond, VA	L 21–24	10,926	
October 9	at No. 23 Boston University	Nickerson Field; Boston, MA	L 14–17		
October 16	No. 17 William & Mary	Parsons Field; Brookline, MA	L 6–53	4,200	
October 23	at New Hampshire	Cowell Stadium; Durham, NH	L 6–21		
October 30	UMass	Parsons Field; Brookline, MA	L 17–21	5,500	
November 6	James Madison	Parsons Field; Brookline, MA	L 21–52	2,100	
November 13	at Maine	Alumni Field; Orono, ME	W 34–20		
November 20	No. 19 Delaware	Parsons Field; Brookline, MA	L 23–28	2,805	
*Non-conference game; Rankings from The Sports Network Poll released prior to the game
