= 1993 Colgate Red Raiders football team =

American college football season

1993 Colgate Red Raiders football
- Conference: Patriot League
- Record: 3–7–1 (1–3–1 Patriot)
- Head coach: Ed Sweeney (1st season)
- Captains: Tony Barrett; Mark Plaske; Bill Sparacio
- Home stadium: Andy Kerr Stadium

1993 Patriot League football standings
	Conf.					Overall
Team	W		L		T	W		L		T
Lehigh $	4	–	1	–	0	7	–	4	–	0
Lafayette	3	–	1	–	1	5	–	4	–	2
Bucknell	3	–	2	–	0	4	–	7	–	0
Holy Cross	2	–	3	–	0	3	–	8	–	0
Colgate	1	–	3	–	1	3	–	7	–	1
Fordham	1	–	4	–	0	1	–	10	–	0
$ – Conference champion

The 1993 Colgate Red Raiders football team was an American football team that represented Colgate University during the 1993 NCAA Division I-AA football season. Colgate finished second-to-last in the Patriot League.

In its first season under head coach Ed Sweeney, the team compiled a 3–7–1 record. Tony Barrett, Mark Plaske and Bill Sparacio were the team captains.

The Red Raiders were outscored 284 to 149. Colgate's 1–3–1 conference record placed fifth in the six-team Patriot League standings.

The team played its home games at Andy Kerr Stadium in Hamilton, New York.

== Schedule ==
Date	Opponent	Site	Result	Attendance	Source
September 4	at Rutgers*	Giants Stadium; East Rutherford, NJ	L 6–68	19,194	
September 11	at Army*	Michie Stadium; West Point, NY	L 0–30	26,398	
September 25	at Cornell*	Schoellkopf Field; Ithaca, NY (rivalry)	W 22–6	10,000	
October 2	Columbia*	Andy Kerr Stadium; Hamilton, NY	W 27–24		
October 9	Penn*	Andy Kerr Stadium; Hamilton, NY	L 12–30	3,000	
October 16	at Navy*	Navy–Marine Corps Memorial Stadium; Annapolis, MD	L 3–31	21,780	
October 23	Lehigh	Andy Kerr Stadium; Hamilton, NY	L 32–36	4,000	
October 30	at Lafayette	Fisher Field; Easton, PA	T 7–7	3,877	
November 6	at Fordham	Coffey Field; Bronx, NY	L 13–17	3,122	
November 13	at Holy Cross	Fitton Field; Worcester, MA	L 14–27	3,771	
November 20	Bucknell	Andy Kerr Stadium; Hamilton, NY	W 13–8	1,200	
*Non-conference game
