= 1993 Connecticut Huskies football team =

American college football season

1993 Connecticut Huskies football
- Conference: Yankee Conference
- New England Division
- Record: 6–5 (5–3 Yankee)
- Head coach: Tom Jackson (11th season)
- Home stadium: Memorial Stadium

1993 Yankee Conference football standings
	Conf.					Overall
Team	W		L		T	W		L		T
New England Division
No. 6 Boston University x$^	8	–	0	–	0	12	–	1	–	0
No. 25 UMass	6	–	2	–	0	9	–	2	–	0
Connecticut	5	–	3	–	0	6	–	5	–	0
New Hampshire	4	–	4	–	0	6	–	5	–	0
Rhode Island	2	–	6	–	0	4	–	7	–	0
Maine	0	–	8	–	0	0	–	11	–	0
Mid-Atlantic Division
No. 10 William & Mary x^	7	–	1	–	0	9	–	3	–	0
No. 18 Delaware ^	6	–	2	–	0	9	–	4	–	0
James Madison	4	–	4	–	0	6	–	5	–	0
Richmond	3	–	5	–	0	5	–	6	–	0
Northeastern	2	–	6	–	0	2	–	9	–	0
Villanova	1	–	7	–	0	3	–	8	–	0
$ – Conference champion; x – Division champion/co-champions; ^ – NCAA Division I-AA playoff participant; Rankings from The Sports Network poll

The 1993 Connecticut Huskies football team represented the University of Connecticut in the 1993 NCAA Division I-AA football season. The Huskies were led by 11th-year head coach Tom Jackson, and completed the season with a record of 6–5.

== Schedule ==
Date	Opponent	Site	Result	Attendance	Source
September 4	at Furman*	Paladin Stadium; Greenville, SC	L 17–26	9,193	
September 11	New Hampshire	Memorial Stadium; Storrs, CT	W 24–23 ^{OT}	8,117	
September 18	James Madison	Memorial Stadium; Storrs, CT	W 45–34	4,342	
September 25	at Yale*	Yale Bowl; New Haven, CT	W 25–14	10,410	
October 2	Towson State*	Memorial Stadium; Storrs, CT	L 27–28	11,247	
October 9	at Villanova	Villanova Stadium; Villanova, PA	L 14–17	6,897	
October 16	UMass	Memorial Stadium; Storrs, CT (rivalry)	L 17–20	12,001	
October 23	at Maine	Alumni Field; Orono, ME	W 14–13	8,047	
October 30	at No. 21 Richmond	UR Stadium; Richmond, VA	W 21–3	3,529	
November 6	Rhode Island	Meade Stadium; Kingston, RI (rivalry)	W 41–9	3,472	
November 13	at No. 6 Boston University	Memorial Stadium; Storrs, CT	L 16–30		
*Non-conference game; Rankings from The Sports Network Poll released prior to the game

== After the season ==
=== NFL draft ===
The following Husky was selected in the National Football League draft following the season.

Round	Pick	Player	Position	NFL club
6	190	Paul Duckworth	Linebacker	Green Bay Packers
