= 1993 Delaware Fightin' Blue Hens football team =

American college football season

1993 Delaware Fightin' Blue Hens football

Yankee Conference champion ECAC Team of the Year

NCAA Division I-AA Quarterfinal, L 31–34 at Marshall
- Conference: Yankee Conference
- Mid-Atlantic Division

Ranking
- Sports Network: No. 18
- Record: 9–4 (6–2 Yankee)
- Head coach: Tubby Raymond (28th season)
- Offensive coordinator: Ted Kempski (26th season)
- Offensive scheme: Delaware Wing-T
- Defensive coordinator: Bob Sabol (3rd season)
- Base defense: 4–3
- Home stadium: Delaware Stadium

1993 Yankee Conference football standings
	Conf.					Overall
Team	W		L		T	W		L		T
New England Division
No. 6 Boston University x$^	8	–	0	–	0	12	–	1	–	0
No. 25 UMass	6	–	2	–	0	9	–	2	–	0
Connecticut	5	–	3	–	0	6	–	5	–	0
New Hampshire	4	–	4	–	0	6	–	5	–	0
Rhode Island	2	–	6	–	0	4	–	7	–	0
Maine	0	–	8	–	0	0	–	11	–	0
Mid-Atlantic Division
No. 10 William & Mary x^	7	–	1	–	0	9	–	3	–	0
No. 18 Delaware ^	6	–	2	–	0	9	–	4	–	0
James Madison	4	–	4	–	0	6	–	5	–	0
Richmond	3	–	5	–	0	5	–	6	–	0
Northeastern	2	–	6	–	0	2	–	9	–	0
Villanova	1	–	7	–	0	3	–	8	–	0
$ – Conference champion; x – Division champion/co-champions; ^ – NCAA Division I-AA playoff participant; Rankings from The Sports Network poll

The 1993 Delaware Fightin' Blue Hens football team represented the University of Delaware as a member of the Mid-Atlantic Division of the Yankee Conference during the 1993 NCAA Division I-AA football season. Led by 28th-year head coach Tubby Raymond, the Fightin' Blue Hens compiled an overall record of 9–4 with a mark of 6–2 in conference play, placing second in the Yankee Conference's Mid-Atlantic Division. For the third consecutive season, Delaware advanced to the NCAA Division I-AA Football Championship playoffs, where the Fightin' Blue Hens beat Montana in the first round before for losing to the eventual national runner-up, Marshall, in the quarterfinals. The team played home games at Delaware Stadium in Newark, Delaware.

== Schedule ==
Date	Opponent	Rank	Site	Result	Attendance	Source
September 4	Lehigh*	No. 5	Delaware Stadium; Newark, DE (rivalry)	W 62–21	14,007	
September 11	No. 11 William & Mary	No. 3	Delaware Stadium; Newark, DE (rivalry)	W 42–35	13,612	
September 18	at Rhode Island	No. 3	Meade Stadium; Kingston, RI	W 32–11	3,556	
September 25	West Chester*	No. 3	Delaware Stadium; Newark, DE (rivalry)	W 56–41	16,104	
October 9	at James Madison	No. 2	Bridgeforth Stadium; Harrisonburg, VA (rivalry)	L 38–42	11,000	
October 16	Villanova	No. 7	Delaware Stadium; Newark, DE (Battle of the Blue)	W 19–7	18,251	
October 23	at UMass	No. 7	Warren McGuirk Alumni Stadium; Hadley, MA	L 29–43	13,102	
October 30	Maine^{†}	No. 15	Delaware Stadium; Newark, DE	W 21–19		
November 6	Towson State*	No. 14	Delaware Stadium; Newark, DE	L 30–32	20,709	
November 13	Richmond	No. 22	Delaware Stadium; Newark, DE	W 48–10	13,444	
November 20	at Northeastern	No. 19	Parsons Field; Brookline, MA	W 28–23	2,805	
November 27	at No. 3 Montana*	No. 18	Washington–Grizzly Stadium; Missoula, MT (NCAA Division I-AA First Round)	W 49–48	11,271	
December 4	at No. 9 Marshall*	No. 18	Marshall University Stadium; Huntington, WV (NCAA Division I-AA Quarterfinal)	L 31–34	13,687	
*Non-conference game; ^{†}Homecoming; Rankings from The Sports Network Poll released prior to the game

== Roster ==
1993 Delaware Fightin' Blue Hens football team roster
Players
Coaches
Offense

Pos.	#	Name	Class
WR	2	Keita Malloy	Sr
RB	3	Pat Williams	So
QB	8	Dale Fry	Sr
QB	9	Leo Hamlett	So
OT	53	John Lamancusa	So
WR	82	Dan Cooper	Sr

Defense

Pos.	#	Name	Class
DB	4	Paul Williams	So
S	5	Donald Tyler	Sr
S	7	Scott Acker	Sr
DB	17	Mike Ryan	So

Special teams

Pos.	#	Name	Class

Head coach

- Tubby Raymond

Coordinators/assistant coaches

Legend

- (C) Team captain
- (S) Suspended
- (I) Ineligible
- Injured
- Redshirt

Roster
