= 1993 Richmond Spiders football team =

American college football season

1993 Richmond Spiders football
- Conference: Yankee Conference
- Record: 5–6 (3–5 Yankee)
- Head coach: Jim Marshall (5th season)
- Home stadium: UR Stadium

1993 Yankee Conference football standings
	Conf.					Overall
Team	W		L		T	W		L		T
New England Division
No. 6 Boston University x$^	8	–	0	–	0	12	–	1	–	0
No. 25 UMass	6	–	2	–	0	9	–	2	–	0
Connecticut	5	–	3	–	0	6	–	5	–	0
New Hampshire	4	–	4	–	0	6	–	5	–	0
Rhode Island	2	–	6	–	0	4	–	7	–	0
Maine	0	–	8	–	0	0	–	11	–	0
Mid-Atlantic Division
No. 10 William & Mary x^	7	–	1	–	0	9	–	3	–	0
No. 18 Delaware ^	6	–	2	–	0	9	–	4	–	0
James Madison	4	–	4	–	0	6	–	5	–	0
Richmond	3	–	5	–	0	5	–	6	–	0
Northeastern	2	–	6	–	0	2	–	9	–	0
Villanova	1	–	7	–	0	3	–	8	–	0
$ – Conference champion; x – Division champion/co-champions; ^ – NCAA Division I-AA playoff participant; Rankings from The Sports Network poll

The 1993 Richmond Spiders football team was an American football team that represented the University of Richmond as a member of the Yankee Conference during the 1993 NCAA Division I-AA football season. In their fifth season under head coach Jim Marshall, Richmond compiled a 5–6 record, with a mark of 3–5 in conference play, finishing in fourth place in the Mid-Atlantic division of the Yankee.

== Schedule ==
Date	Opponent	Rank	Site	Result	Attendance	Source
September 4	VMI*	No. 19	UR Stadium; Richmond, VA (rivalry)	W 38–14	9,842	
September 11	at James Madison*	No. 14	Bridgeforth Stadium; Harrisonburg, VA (rivalry)	W 20–13	10,000	
September 18	at New Hampshire	No. 9	Cowell Stadium; Durham, NH	L 20–31	5,122	
September 25	Villanova	No. 19	UR Stadium; Richmond, VA	W 21–7	7,982	
October 2	Northeastern	No. 15	UR Stadium; Richmond, VA	W 24–21	10,926	
October 9	at Maine	No. 14	Fitzpatrick Stadium; Portland, ME	W 17–14	3,459	
October 16	No. 18 Boston University^{†}	No. 14	UR Stadium; Richmond, VA	L 14–44	11,612	
October 30	Connecticut	No. 21	UR Stadium; Richmond, VA	L 3–21	3,529	
November 6	at No. 25 UMass		McGuirk Stadium; Hadley, MA	L 24–29	5,139	
November 13	at No. 22 Delaware		Delaware Stadium; Newark, DE	L 10–48	13,444	
November 20	at No. 10 William & Mary		Zable Stadium; Williamsburg, VA (rivalry)	L 17–31	12,110	
*Non-conference game; ^{†}Homecoming; Rankings from NCAA Division I-AA Football Committee Poll released prior to the game
