= 1992 Lehigh Engineers football team =

American college football season

1992 Lehigh Engineers football
- Conference: Patriot League
- Record: 3–8 (2–3 Patriot)
- Head coach: Hank Small (7th season)
- Captains: Adam Ciperski; Jason Cristino
- Home stadium: Goodman Stadium

1992 Patriot League football standings
	Conf.					Overall
Team	W		L		T	W		L		T
Lafayette $	5	–	0	–	0	8	–	3	–	0
Holy Cross	4	–	1	–	0	6	–	5	–	0
Colgate	2	–	3	–	0	4	–	7	–	0
Lehigh	2	–	3	–	0	3	–	8	–	0
Bucknell	1	–	4	–	0	4	–	7	–	0
Fordham	1	–	4	–	0	1	–	9	–	0
$ – Conference champion

The 1992 Lehigh Engineers football team was an American football team that represented Lehigh University during the 1992 NCAA Division I-AA football season. Lehigh tied for third place in the Patriot League.

In their seventh year under head coach Hank Small, the Engineers compiled a 3–8 record. Adam Ciperski and Jason Cristino were the team captains.

The Engineers were outscored 291 to 258. Their 2–3 conference record tied for third place in the six-team Patriot League standings.

Lehigh played its home games at Goodman Stadium on the university's Goodman Campus in Bethlehem, Pennsylvania.

== Schedule ==
Date	Opponent	Site	Result	Attendance	Source
September 12	Fordham	Goodman Stadium; Bethlehem, PA	W 16–14	11,822	
September 19	New Hampshire*	Goodman Stadium; Bethlehem, PA	L 14–28	7,183	
September 26	at Cornell*	Schoellkopf Field; Ithaca, NY	L 23–29	6,500	
October 3	Princeton*	Goodman Stadium; Bethlehem, PA	L 28–38	13,448	
October 10	at Northeastern*	Parsons Field; Brookline, MA	L 28–42	4,400	
October 17	at Brown*	Brown Stadium; Providence, RI	W 31–24	3,400	
October 24	Colgate	Goodman Stadium; Bethlehem, PA	L 13–14	11,232	
October 31	at Holy Cross	Fitton Field; Worcester, MA	L 25–28	5,321	
November 7	Bucknell	Goodman Stadium; Bethlehem, PA	W 38–16	8,373	
November 14	at No. 18 William & Mary*	Zable Stadium; Williamsburg, VA	L 13–26	10,329	
November 21	at Lafayette	Fisher Field; Easton, PA (The Rivalry)	L 29–32	13,725	
*Non-conference game; Rankings from NCAA Division I-AA Football Committee Poll released prior to the game

== Roster ==
1992 Lehigh Mountain Hawks football team roster
Players
Coaches
Offense

Pos.	#	Name	Class
QB	2	Jim Guzzo	So
QB	9	Scott Semptimphelter	Jr

Defense

Pos.	#	Name	Class
DE		Rich Owens	So

Special teams

Pos.	#	Name	Class
K	4	Chris Graf	So

Head coach

- Hank Small

Coordinators/assistant coaches

Legend

- (C) Team captain
- (S) Suspended
- (I) Ineligible
- Injured
- Redshirt
