= 1993 Maine Black Bears football team =

American college football season

1993 Maine Black Bears football
- Conference: Yankee Conference
- Record: 0–11 (0–8 Yankee)
- Head coach: Jack Cosgrove (1st season)
- Offensive coordinator: Paul Dunn (1st season)
- Defensive coordinator: Chuck Bresnahan (2nd season)
- Captain: Game captains
- Home stadium: Alumni Field

1993 Yankee Conference football standings
	Conf.					Overall
Team	W		L		T	W		L		T
New England Division
No. 6 Boston University x$^	8	–	0	–	0	12	–	1	–	0
No. 25 UMass	6	–	2	–	0	9	–	2	–	0
Connecticut	5	–	3	–	0	6	–	5	–	0
New Hampshire	4	–	4	–	0	6	–	5	–	0
Rhode Island	2	–	6	–	0	4	–	7	–	0
Maine	0	–	8	–	0	0	–	11	–	0
Mid-Atlantic Division
No. 10 William & Mary x^	7	–	1	–	0	9	–	3	–	0
No. 18 Delaware ^	6	–	2	–	0	9	–	4	–	0
James Madison	4	–	4	–	0	6	–	5	–	0
Richmond	3	–	5	–	0	5	–	6	–	0
Northeastern	2	–	6	–	0	2	–	9	–	0
Villanova	1	–	7	–	0	3	–	8	–	0
$ – Conference champion; x – Division champion/co-champions; ^ – NCAA Division I-AA playoff participant; Rankings from The Sports Network poll

The 1993 Maine Black Bears football team was an American football team that represented the University of Maine as a member of the Yankee Conference during the 1993 NCAA Division I-AA football season. In their first season under head coach Jack Cosgrove, the Black Bears compiled a 3–8 record (2–6 against conference opponents) and finished last in the New England Division of the Yankee Conference.

The team's three victories were later forfeited for the use of ineligible players. The school's athletic director resigned following the controversy.

== Schedule ==
Date	Opponent	Site	Result	Attendance	Source
September 4	at Buffalo	University at Buffalo Stadium; Amherst, NY	L 30–27 (forfeit)	14,179	
September 11	at Boston University	Nickerson Field; Boston, MA	L 0–45		
September 18	No. 25 UMass	Alumni Field; Orono, ME	L 17–13 (forfeit)	7,924	
September 25	at New Hampshire	Cowell Stadium; Durham, NH (rivalry)	L 13–63		
October 9	vs. No. 14 Richmond	Fitzpatrick Stadium; Portland, ME	L 14–17	3,459	
October 16	at Rhode Island	Meade Stadium; Kingston, RI	L 26–23 (forfeit) ^{2OT}	6,879	
October 23	Connecticut	Alumi Field; Orono, ME	L 13–14	8,047	
October 30	at No. 15 Delaware	Delaware Stadium; Newark, DE	L 19–21		
November 6	No. 11 William & Mary	Alumni Field; Orono, ME	L 23–47	3,400	
November 13	Northeastern	Alumni Field; Orono, ME	L 20–34		
November 20	Hofstra	Alumni Field; Orono, ME	L 15–27		
Rankings from The Sports Network Poll released prior to the game
