= 1993 Villanova Wildcats football team =

American college football season

1993 Villanova Wildcats football
- Conference: Yankee Conference
- Record: 3–8 (1–7 Yankee)
- Head coach: Andy Talley (9th season)
- Defensive coordinator: Dan MacNeill (6th season)
- Home stadium: Villanova Stadium

1993 Yankee Conference football standings
	Conf.					Overall
Team	W		L		T	W		L		T
New England Division
No. 6 Boston University x$^	8	–	0	–	0	12	–	1	–	0
No. 25 UMass	6	–	2	–	0	9	–	2	–	0
Connecticut	5	–	3	–	0	6	–	5	–	0
New Hampshire	4	–	4	–	0	6	–	5	–	0
Rhode Island	2	–	6	–	0	4	–	7	–	0
Maine	0	–	8	–	0	0	–	11	–	0
Mid-Atlantic Division
No. 10 William & Mary x^	7	–	1	–	0	9	–	3	–	0
No. 18 Delaware ^	6	–	2	–	0	9	–	4	–	0
James Madison	4	–	4	–	0	6	–	5	–	0
Richmond	3	–	5	–	0	5	–	6	–	0
Northeastern	2	–	6	–	0	2	–	9	–	0
Villanova	1	–	7	–	0	3	–	8	–	0
$ – Conference champion; x – Division champion/co-champions; ^ – NCAA Division I-AA playoff participant; Rankings from The Sports Network poll

The 1993 Villanova Wildcats football team was an American football team that represented the Villanova University as a member of the Yankee Conference during the 1993 NCAA Division I-AA football season. In their ninth year under head coach Andy Talley, the team compiled a 3–8 record.

== Schedule ==
Date	Opponent	Site	Result	Attendance	Source
September 10	Northeastern	Villanova Stadium; Villanova, PA	L 3–27	6,794	
September 18	Fordham*	Villanova Stadium; Villanova, PA	W 25–5	8,123	
September 25	at Richmond	University of Richmond Stadium; Richmond, VA	L 7–21	7,982	
October 2	at Boston University	Nickerson Field; Boston, MA	L 15–30		
October 9	Connecticut	Villanova Stadium; Villanova, PA	W 17–14	6,897	
October 16	at Delaware	Delaware Stadium; Newark, DE (rivalry)	L 7–19	18,251	
October 23	at No. 17 William & Mary	Zable Stadium; Williamsburg, VA	L 17–51	17,616	
October 30	Rhode Island	Villanova Stadium; Villanova, PA	W 14–10		
November 6	New Hampshire^{†}	Villanova Stadium; Villanova, PA	L 14–45	5,632	
November 13	James Madison	Villanova Stadium; Villanova, PA	L 3–42	4,616	
November 20	at Liberty*	Williams Stadium; Lynchburg, VA	L 13–27	4,300	
*Non-conference game; ^{†}Homecoming; Rankings from The Sports Network Poll released prior to the game
