= 1993 James Madison Dukes football team =

American college football season

1993 James Madison Dukes football
- Conference: Yankee Conference
- Mid-Atlantic Division
- Record: 6–5 (4–5 Yankee)
- Head coach: Rip Scherer (3rd season)
- Home stadium: Bridgeforth Stadium

1993 Yankee Conference football standings
	Conf.					Overall
Team	W		L		T	W		L		T
New England Division
No. 6 Boston University x$^	8	–	0	–	0	12	–	1	–	0
No. 25 UMass	6	–	2	–	0	9	–	2	–	0
Connecticut	5	–	3	–	0	6	–	5	–	0
New Hampshire	4	–	4	–	0	6	–	5	–	0
Rhode Island	2	–	6	–	0	4	–	7	–	0
Maine	0	–	8	–	0	0	–	11	–	0
Mid-Atlantic Division
No. 10 William & Mary x^	7	–	1	–	0	9	–	3	–	0
No. 18 Delaware ^	6	–	2	–	0	9	–	4	–	0
James Madison	4	–	4	–	0	6	–	5	–	0
Richmond	3	–	5	–	0	5	–	6	–	0
Northeastern	2	–	6	–	0	2	–	9	–	0
Villanova	1	–	7	–	0	3	–	8	–	0
$ – Conference champion; x – Division champion/co-champions; ^ – NCAA Division I-AA playoff participant; Rankings from The Sports Network poll

The 1993 James Madison Dukes football team was an American football team that represented James Madison University during the 1993 NCAA Division I-AA football season as a member of the Yankee Conference. In their third year under head coach Rip Scherer, the team compiled a 6–5 record.

== Schedule ==
Date	Opponent	Site	Result	Attendance	Source
September 4	Lock Haven*	Bridgeforth Stadium; Harrisonburg, VA	W 55–3	10,000	
September 11	Richmond	Bridgeforth Stadium; Harrisonburg, VA (rivalry)	L 13–20	10,000	
September 18	at Connecticut	Memorial Stadium; Storrs, CT	L 34–45	4,342	
September 25	Jacksonville State*	Bridgeforth Stadium; Harrisonburg, VA	W 35–14		
October 2	at UMass	McGuirk Stadium; Hadley, MA	L 10–33	14,207	
October 9	No. 2 Delaware	Bridgeforth Stadium; Harrisonburg, VA (rivalry)	W 42–38	11,000	
October 16	New Hampshire	Bridgeforth Stadium; Harrisonburg, VA	W 45–21	13,000	
October 30	at No. 13 William & Mary	Zable Stadium; Williamsburg, VA (rivalry)	L 26–31	11,698	
November 6	at Northeastern	Parsons Field; Brookline, MA	W 52–21	2,100	
November 13	at Villanova	Villanova Stadium; Villanova, PA	W 42–3	4,616	
November 20	No. 6 Boston University	Bridgeforth Stadium; Harrisonburg, VA	L 21–24		
*Non-conference game; Rankings from The Sports Network Poll released prior to the game
