= 1993 Boston University Terriers football team =

American college football season

1993 Boston University Terriers football

Yankee Conference champion Lambert Cup winner

NCAA Division I-AA Quarterfinal, L 14–21 at Idaho
- Conference: Yankee Conference
- New England Division

Ranking
- Sports Network: No. 6
- Record: 12–1 (8–0 Yankee)
- Head coach: Dan Allen (4th season)
- Offensive coordinator: Tony Sparano (5th season)
- Defensive coordinator: Tom Masella (1st season)
- Captains: Marc Fauci; Mike Pedone
- Home stadium: Nickerson Field

1993 Yankee Conference football standings
	Conf.					Overall
Team	W		L		T	W		L		T
New England Division
No. 6 Boston University x$^	8	–	0	–	0	12	–	1	–	0
No. 25 UMass	6	–	2	–	0	9	–	2	–	0
Connecticut	5	–	3	–	0	6	–	5	–	0
New Hampshire	4	–	4	–	0	6	–	5	–	0
Rhode Island	2	–	6	–	0	4	–	7	–	0
Maine	0	–	8	–	0	0	–	11	–	0
Mid-Atlantic Division
No. 10 William & Mary x^	7	–	1	–	0	9	–	3	–	0
No. 18 Delaware ^	6	–	2	–	0	9	–	4	–	0
James Madison	4	–	4	–	0	6	–	5	–	0
Richmond	3	–	5	–	0	5	–	6	–	0
Northeastern	2	–	6	–	0	2	–	9	–	0
Villanova	1	–	7	–	0	3	–	8	–	0
$ – Conference champion; x – Division champion/co-champions; ^ – NCAA Division I-AA playoff participant; Rankings from The Sports Network poll

The 1993 Boston University Terriers football team was an American football team that represented Boston University as a member of the Yankee Conference during the 1993 NCAA Division I-AA football season. In their fourth season under head coach Dan Allen, the Terriers compiled an 11–0 (8–0 in conference games) record in the regular season, won the Yankee Conference championship, and advanced to the Division I-AA playoffs where they defeated Northern Iowa in the first round and lost to Idaho in the quarterfinals. They concluded the season with a 12–1 record, having outscored opponents by a total of 436 to 211.

Quarterback Robert Dougherty completed 212 of 386 passes for 2,875 yards and 18 touchdowns. He also tallied 11 rushing touchdowns and was the Yankee Conference Player of the Year.

The team played its home games at Nickerson Field in Boston.

== Schedule ==
Date	Time	Opponent	Rank	Site	Result	Attendance	Source
September 11		Maine		Nickerson Field; Boston, MA	W 45–0		
September 18		at Holy Cross*		Fitton Field; Worcester, MA	W 44–18	6,211	
September 25		UMass		Nickerson Field; Boston, MA	W 28–9	7,508	
October 2		Villanova		Nickerson Field; Boston, MA	W 30–15		
October 9		Northeastern	No. 23	Nickerson Field; Boston, MA	W 17–14		
October 16		at No. 14 Richmond	No. 18	City Stadium; Richmond, VA	W 44–14	11,612	
October 23		Rhode Island	No. 15	Nickerson Field; Boston, MA	W 48–15	11,052	
October 30		at New Hampshire	No. 10	Cowell Stadium; Durham, NH	W 24–14		
November 6		Buffalo*	No. 9	Nickerson Field; Boston, MA	W 61–33	6,525	
November 13		at Connecticut	No. 8	Memorial Stadium; Storrs, CT	W 30–16		
November 20		at James Madison	No. 6	Bridgeforth Stadium; Harrisonburg, VA	W 24–21		
November 27	1:00 p.m.	No. 13 Northern Iowa*	No. 6	Nickerson Field; Boston, MA (NCAA Division I-AA First Round)	W 27–21 ^{2OT}	6,882	
December 4	10:05 a.m.	at No. 11 Idaho*	No. 6	Kibbie Dome; Moscow, ID (NCAA Division I-AA Quarterfinal)	L 14–21	8,800	
*Non-conference game; Rankings from The Sports Network Poll released prior to the game; All times are in Eastern time
