= Hank Small =

American football player, coach, and administrator (born 1947)

Biographical details
- Born: April 25, 1947 (age 79); Livingston, New Jersey, U.S.

Playing career
- 1966–1968: Gettysburg
- Position: End

Coaching career (HC unless noted)
- 1970: Rutgers (assistant freshmen)
- 1971–1972: Florida State (QB/WR)
- 1973–1975: Brown (QB/WR)
- 1978–1982: Princeton (offensive backfield)
- 1983–1984: Princeton (OC)
- 1985: Brown (OC/QB)
- 1986–1993: Lehigh
- 1995–1996: Wake Forest (RB)
- 1997–1998: Wake Forest (OC/RB)

Administrative career (AD unless noted)
- 1976–1977: New England Patriots (player personnel)
- 2001–2018: Charleston Southern

Head coaching record
- Overall: 47–40–1

Accomplishments and honors

Championships
- 1 Patriot (1993)

Awards
- Patriot Coach of the Year (1993)

Henry N. Small (born April 25, 1947) is an American former football coach and college athletics administrator. He served as the head football coach at Lehigh University in Bethlehem, Pennsylvania from 1986 to 1993, compiling a record of 47–40–1. Small was athletic director at Charleston Southern University, an NCAA Division I school in Charleston, South Carolina from 2001 to 2018.

Small spent four years as the offensive coordinator at Wake Forest University and also coached at Rutgers University, Florida State University, Princeton University, and Brown University. He also spent a year in the player personnel office of the New England Patriots of the National Football League (NFL).

== Head coaching record ==
=== College ===
Year	Team	Overall	Conference	Standing	Bowl/playoffs
Lehigh Engineers (Patriot League) (1986–1993)
1986	Lehigh	5–6	2–2	T–2nd	
1987	Lehigh	5–5–1	3–1–1	2nd	
1988	Lehigh	6–5	2–3	T–3rd	
1989	Lehigh	5–6	1–3	T–3rd	
1990	Lehigh	7–4	3–2	T–2nd	
1991	Lehigh	9–2	3–2	T–2nd	
1992	Lehigh	3–8	2–3	T–4th	
1993	Lehigh	7–4	4–1	1st	
Lehigh:		75–38–2	20–17		
Total:		75–38–2			
