= 1993 Princeton Tigers football team =

American college football season

1993 Princeton Tigers football
- Conference: Ivy League
- Record: 8–2 (5–2 Ivy)
- Head coach: Steve Tosches (7th season)
- Defensive coordinator: Mark Harriman (5th season)
- Captains: Keith Elias; Reggie Harris
- Home stadium: Palmer Stadium

1993 Ivy League football standings
	Conf.					Overall
Team	W		L		T	W		L		T
No. 16 Penn $	7	–	0	–	0	10	–	0	–	0
Dartmouth	6	–	1	–	0	7	–	3	–	0
Princeton	5	–	2	–	0	8	–	2	–	0
Brown	3	–	4	–	0	4	–	6	–	0
Cornell	3	–	4	–	0	4	–	6	–	0
Yale	2	–	5	–	0	3	–	7	–	0
Harvard	1	–	6	–	0	3	–	7	–	0
Columbia	1	–	6	–	0	2	–	8	–	0
+ – Conference co-champions; Rankings from The Sports Network poll

The 1993 Princeton Tigers football team was an American football team that represented Princeton University during the 1993 NCAA Division I-AA football season. Princeton finished third in the Ivy League.

In their seventh year under head coach Steve Tosches, the Tigers compiled an 8–2 record and outscored opponents 241 to 136. Keith Elias and Reggie Harris were the team captains.

Princeton's 5–2 conference record placed third in the Ivy League standings. The Tigers outscored Ivy opponents 151 to 106.

Though unranked in the preseason national rankings, Princeton's seven-game win streak to open the season saw it enter the weekly top 25 in mid-October, reaching as high as No. 16. After its season-ending loss to unranked Dartmouth, Princeton dropped out of the poll and ended the year unranked.

Princeton played its home games at Palmer Stadium on the university campus in Princeton, New Jersey.

== Schedule ==
Date	Opponent	Rank	Site	Result	Attendance	Source
September 18	Cornell		Palmer Stadium; Princeton, NJ	W 18–12	10,276	
September 25	at Lafayette*		Fisher Field; Easton, PA	W 21–7	8,049	
October 2	Holy Cross*		Palmer Stadium; Princeton, NJ	W 38–0	7,520	
October 9	at Brown		Brown Stadium; Providence, RI	W 34–16	3,571	
October 16	Lehigh*	No. 24	Palmer Stadium; Princeton, NJ	W 31–23	11,120	
October 23	at Harvard	No. 21	Harvard Stadium; Boston, MA (rivalry)	W 21–10	19,309	
October 30	Columbia	No. 18	Palmer Stadium; Princeton, NJ	W 14–3	5,176	
November 6	at No. 21 Penn	No. 16	Franklin Field; Philadelphia, PA (rivalry)	L 14–30	35,810	
November 13	Yale	No. 24	Palmer Stadium; Princeton, NJ (rivalry)	W 28–7	17,899	
November 20	at Dartmouth	No. 21	Memorial Field; Hanover, NH	L 22–28	9,120	
*Non-conference game; Rankings from The Sports Network Poll released prior to the game
