= 1993 Rhode Island Rams football team =

American college football season

1993 Rhode Island Rams football
- Conference: Yankee Conference
- New England Division
- Record: 4–7 (2–6 Yankee)
- Head coach: Floyd Keith (1st season)
- Defensive coordinator: Mike Mallory (1st season)
- Home stadium: Meade Stadium

1993 Yankee Conference football standings
	Conf.					Overall
Team	W		L		T	W		L		T
New England Division
No. 6 Boston University x$^	8	–	0	–	0	12	–	1	–	0
No. 25 UMass	6	–	2	–	0	9	–	2	–	0
Connecticut	5	–	3	–	0	6	–	5	–	0
New Hampshire	4	–	4	–	0	6	–	5	–	0
Rhode Island	2	–	6	–	0	4	–	7	–	0
Maine	0	–	8	–	0	0	–	11	–	0
Mid-Atlantic Division
No. 10 William & Mary x^	7	–	1	–	0	9	–	3	–	0
No. 18 Delaware ^	6	–	2	–	0	9	–	4	–	0
James Madison	4	–	4	–	0	6	–	5	–	0
Richmond	3	–	5	–	0	5	–	6	–	0
Northeastern	2	–	6	–	0	2	–	9	–	0
Villanova	1	–	7	–	0	3	–	8	–	0
$ – Conference champion; x – Division champion/co-champions; ^ – NCAA Division I-AA playoff participant; Rankings from The Sports Network poll

The 1993 Rhode Island Rams football team was an American football team that represented the University of Rhode Island in the Yankee Conference during the 1993 NCAA Division I-AA football season. In their first season under head coach Floyd Keith, the Rams compiled a 4–7 record (2–6 against conference opponents) and finished fourth in the New England Division of the Yankee Conference.

The matchup with rival UMass was originally scheduled to be played as the Emerald Isle Classic at Fitzgerald Stadium in Killarney, Ireland. In August the game was relocated from Ireland to McGuirk Stadium in Hadley, Massachusetts after it was determined the game would be a financial loss for each school.

== Schedule ==
Date	Opponent	Site	Result	Attendance	Source
September 4	at Boise State*	Bronco Stadium; Boise, ID	L 10–31	17,618	
September 11	Hofstra*	Meade Stadium; Kingston, RI	W 37–32	4,470	
September 18	No. 3 Delaware	Meade Stadium; Kingston, RI	L 11–32	3,556	
September 25	Northeastern	Meade Stadium; Kingston, RI	W 15–13	3,133	
October 2	at Brown*	Brown Stadium; Providence, RI (rivalry)	W 30–7	4,429	
October 9	at UMass	McGuirk Stadium; Hadley, MA	L 14–36	5,124	
October 16	Maine^{†} (Note: Maine forfeited for having used ineligible players.)	Meade Stadium; Kingston, RI	W 23–26 ^{2OT} (forfeit)	6,879	
October 23	at No. 15 Boston University	Nickerson Field; Boston, MA	L 15–48	11,052	
October 30	at Villanova	Villanova Stadium; Villanova, PA	L 10–14	1,256	
November 6	Connecticut	Meade Stadium; Kingston, RI (rivalry)	L 9–41	3,472	
November 13	at New Hampshire	Cowell Stadium; Durham, NH	L 33–51	4,347	
*Non-conference game; ^{†}Homecoming; Rankings from The Sports Network Poll released prior to the game
