= 1993 Dartmouth Big Green football team =

American college football season

1993 Dartmouth Big Green football
- Conference: Ivy League
- Record: 7–3 (6–1 Ivy)
- Head coach: John Lyons (2nd season)
- Offensive coordinator: Roger Hughes (2nd season)
- Home stadium: Memorial Field

1993 Ivy League football standings
	Conf.					Overall
Team	W		L		T	W		L		T
No. 16 Penn $	7	–	0	–	0	10	–	0	–	0
Dartmouth	6	–	1	–	0	7	–	3	–	0
Princeton	5	–	2	–	0	8	–	2	–	0
Brown	3	–	4	–	0	4	–	6	–	0
Cornell	3	–	4	–	0	4	–	6	–	0
Yale	2	–	5	–	0	3	–	7	–	0
Harvard	1	–	6	–	0	3	–	7	–	0
Columbia	1	–	6	–	0	2	–	8	–	0
+ – Conference co-champions; Rankings from The Sports Network poll

The 1993 Dartmouth Big Green football team was an American football team that represented Dartmouth College in Ivy League during the 1993 NCAA Division I-AA football season. The played their home games at Memorial Field in Hanover, New Hampshire. They were a member of the Ivy League. In its second season under head coach John Lyons, the team compiled a 7–3 record overall and a 6–1 mark against Ivy League opponents.

The team's statistical leaders included senior quarterback Jay Fiedler with 2,542 passing yards, senior wide receiver John Hyland with 1,076 receiving yards, and Pete Oberle with 660 rushing yards. Fiedler later played 10 seasons in the National Football League.

Five Dartmouth players were selected by conference coaches as first-team players on the 1993 All-Ivy League team: Fielder at quarterback; Hyland at wide receiver; Andy McDonald at offensive line; George Neos at linebacker; and Jim McGeehan at defensive back.

== Schedule ==
Date	Opponent	Site	Result	Attendance	Source
September 18	at Penn	Franklin Field; Philadelphia, PA	L 6–10	13,488	
September 25	Holy Cross*	Memorial Field; Hanover, NH	L 7–13	4,925	
October 2	Bucknell*	Memorial Field; Hanover, NH	W 31–13	7,858	
October 9	at New Hampshire*	Cowell Stadium; Durham, NH (rivalry)	L 7–14	6,309	
October 16	at Yale	Yale Bowl; New Haven, CT	W 31–14	18,316	
October 23	Cornell	Memorial Field; Hanover, NH (rivalry)	W 28–27	7,023	
October 30	Harvard	Memorial Field; Hanover, NH (rivalry)	W 39–34	11,030	
November 6	at Columbia	Wien Stadium; New York, NY	W 42–25	4,485	
November 13	Brown	Memorial Field; Hanover, NH	W 39–16	5,913	
November 20	Princeton	Memorial Field; Hanover, NH	W 28–22	9,120	
*Non-conference game

== Roster ==
1993 Dartmouth Big Green football team roster
Players			Coaches
Offense: Pos. / # / Name / Class; QB / 11 / Jay Fiedler / Sr	Defense: Pos. / # / Name / Class	Special teams: Pos. / # / Name / Class	Head coach: John Lyons; Coordinators/assistant coaches Legend: (C) Team captain; (S) Suspended; (I) Ineligible; Injured; Redshirt; Roster
