= 1993 Cornell Big Red football team =

American college football season

1993 Cornell Big Red football
- Conference: Ivy League
- Record: 4–6 (3–4 Ivy)
- Head coach: Jim Hofher (4th season)
- Captains: Bill Lazor; Chris Zingo
- Home stadium: Schoellkopf Field

1993 Ivy League football standings
	Conf.					Overall
Team	W		L		T	W		L		T
No. 16 Penn $	7	–	0	–	0	10	–	0	–	0
Dartmouth	6	–	1	–	0	7	–	3	–	0
Princeton	5	–	2	–	0	8	–	2	–	0
Brown	3	–	4	–	0	4	–	6	–	0
Cornell	3	–	4	–	0	4	–	6	–	0
Yale	2	–	5	–	0	3	–	7	–	0
Harvard	1	–	6	–	0	3	–	7	–	0
Columbia	1	–	6	–	0	2	–	8	–	0
+ – Conference co-champions; Rankings from The Sports Network poll

The 1993 Cornell Big Red football team was an American football team that represented Cornell University during the 1993 NCAA Division I-AA football season. Cornell tied for fourth in the Ivy League.

In its fourth season under head coach Jim Hofher, the team compiled a 4–6 record and outscored opponents 213 to 158. Bill Lazor and Chris Zingo were the team captains.

Cornell's 3–4 conference record tied for fourth in the Ivy League standings. The Big Red outscored Ivy opponents 146 to 95.

Cornell played its home games at Schoellkopf Field in Ithaca, New York.

== Schedule ==
Date	Opponent	Site	Result	Attendance	Source
September 18	at Princeton	Palmer Stadium; Princeton, NJ	L 12–18	10,276	
September 25	Colgate*	Schoellkopf Field; Ithaca, NY (rivalry)	L 6–22	10,000	
October 2	at Lehigh*	Goodman Stadium; Bethlehem, PA	L 13–35	14,400	
October 9	Harvard	Schoellkopf Field; Ithaca, NY	W 27–0	6,092	
October 16	Fordham*	Schoellkopf Field; Ithaca, NY	W 48–6	7,517	
October 23	at Dartmouth	Memorial Field; Hanover, NH (rivalry)	L 27–28	7,023	
October 30	at Brown	Brown Stadium; Providence, RI	W 21–3	2,174	
November 6	Yale	Schoellkopf Field; Ithaca, NY	W 21–0	9,453	
November 13	Columbia	Schoellkopf Field; Ithaca, NY (rivalry)	L 24–29	5,196	
November 20	at No. 15 Penn	Franklin Field; Philadelphia, PA (rivalry)	L 14–17	22,618	
*Non-conference game; Rankings from The Sports Network Poll released prior to the game
