= 1992 Dartmouth Big Green football team =

American college football season

1992 Dartmouth Big Green football

Ivy League champion
- Conference: Ivy League
- Record: 8–2 (6–1 Ivy)
- Head coach: John Lyons (1st season)
- Offensive coordinator: Roger Hughes (1st season)
- Home stadium: Memorial Field

1992 Ivy League football standings
	Conf.					Overall
Team	W		L		T	W		L		T
Dartmouth +	6	–	1	–	0	8	–	2	–	0
Princeton +	6	–	1	–	0	8	–	2	–	0
Penn	5	–	2	–	0	7	–	3	–	0
Cornell	4	–	3	–	0	7	–	3	–	0
Harvard	3	–	4	–	0	3	–	7	–	0
Yale	2	–	5	–	0	4	–	6	–	0
Columbia	2	–	5	–	0	3	–	7	–	0
Brown	0	–	7	–	0	0	–	10	–	0
+ – Conference co-champions

The 1992 Dartmouth Big Green football team represented Dartmouth College in the 1992 NCAA Division I-AA football season.

== Schedule ==
Date	Opponent	Site	Result	Attendance	Source
September 19	Penn	Memorial Field; Hanover, NH	W 36–17	8,219	
September 26	at New Hampshire*	Cowell Stadium; Durham, NH (rivalry)	L 27–45	6,838	
October 3	Bucknell*	Memorial Field; Hanover, NH	W 44–14	3,803	
October 10	at Holy Cross*	Fitton Field; Worcester, MA	W 48–6	7,151	
October 17	Yale	Memorial Field; Hanover, NH	W 39–27	13,017	
October 24	at Cornell	Schoellkopf Field; Ithaca, NY (rivalry)	L 16–26	14,500	
October 31	at Harvard	Harvard Stadium; Boston, MA (rivalry)	W 31–7	12,850	
November 7	Columbia	Memorial Field; Hanover, NH	W 38–19	2,907	
November 14	at Brown	Brown Stadium; Providence, RI	W 51–28	3,100	
November 21	at Princeton	Palmer Stadium; Princeton, NJ	W 34–20	24,120	
*Non-conference game

== Roster ==
1992 Dartmouth Big Green football team roster
Players			Coaches
Offense: Pos. / # / Name / Class; QB / 11 / Jay Fiedler / Jr	Defense: Pos. / # / Name / Class	Special teams: Pos. / # / Name / Class	Head coach: John Lyons; Coordinators/assistant coaches Legend: (C) Team captain; (S) Suspended; (I) Ineligible; Injured; Redshirt; Roster
