= 1992 Princeton Tigers football team =

American college football season

1992 Princeton Tigers football

Ivy League co-champion
- Conference: Ivy League
- Record: 8–2 (6–1 Ivy)
- Head coach: Steve Tosches (6th season)
- Defensive coordinator: Mark Harriman (4th season)
- Captain: Aaron Harris
- Home stadium: Palmer Stadium

1992 Ivy League football standings
	Conf.					Overall
Team	W		L		T	W		L		T
Dartmouth +	6	–	1	–	0	8	–	2	–	0
Princeton +	6	–	1	–	0	8	–	2	–	0
Penn	5	–	2	–	0	7	–	3	–	0
Cornell	4	–	3	–	0	7	–	3	–	0
Harvard	3	–	4	–	0	3	–	7	–	0
Yale	2	–	5	–	0	4	–	6	–	0
Columbia	2	–	5	–	0	3	–	7	–	0
Brown	0	–	7	–	0	0	–	10	–	0
+ – Conference co-champions

The 1992 Princeton Tigers football team was an American football team that represented Princeton University during the 1992 NCAA Division I-AA football season. Princeton was co-champion of the Ivy League.

In their sixth year under head coach Steve Tosches, the Tigers compiled an 8–2 record and outscored opponents 264 to 175. Aaron Harris was the team captain.

Princeton's 6–1 conference record tied atop the Ivy League standings. The Tigers outscored Ivy League opponents 181 to 102. Princeton's only conference loss was the season-ending showdown with co-champion Dartmouth.

By the closing weeks of the season, Princeton had cracked the national top 20 rankings, listed as No. 20 in the poll of November 9 and No. 17 in the poll of November 16. Following the loss to Dartmouth, Princeton was unranked in the season's final poll.

Princeton played its home games at Palmer Stadium on the university campus in Princeton, New Jersey.

== Schedule ==
Date	Opponent	Site	Result	Attendance	Source
September 19	at Cornell	Schoellkopf Field; Ithaca, NY	W 22–20	13,000	
September 26	Lafayette*	Palmer Stadium; Princeton, NJ	W 38–35	6,820	
October 3	at Lehigh*	Goodman Stadium; Bethlehem, PA	W 38–28	13,448	
October 10	Brown	Palmer Stadium; Princeton, NJ	W 28–14	14,275	
October 17	at Holy Cross*	Fitton Field; Worcester, MA	L 7–10	8,114	
October 24	Harvard	Palmer Stadium; Princeton, NJ (rivalry)	W 21–6	19,250	
October 31	at Columbia	Wien Stadium; New York, NY	W 34–7	9,335	
November 7	Penn	Palmer Stadium; Princeton, NJ (rivalry)	W 20–14	17,421	
November 14	at Yale	Yale Bowl; New Haven, CT (rivalry)	W 36–7	16,450	
November 21	Dartmouth	Palmer Stadium; Princeton, NJ	L 20–34	24,120	
*Non-conference game
