= 1993 Holy Cross Crusaders football team =

American college football season

1993 Holy Cross Crusaders football
- Conference: Patriot League
- Record: 3–8 (2–3 Patriot)
- Head coach: Peter Vaas (2nd season)
- Captains: Todd Araujo; Rob Milanette; Frank Visconti
- Home stadium: Fitton Field

1993 Patriot League football standings
	Conf.					Overall
Team	W		L		T	W		L		T
Lehigh $	4	–	1	–	0	7	–	4	–	0
Lafayette	3	–	1	–	1	5	–	4	–	2
Bucknell	3	–	2	–	0	4	–	7	–	0
Holy Cross	2	–	3	–	0	3	–	8	–	0
Colgate	1	–	3	–	1	3	–	7	–	1
Fordham	1	–	4	–	0	1	–	10	–	0
$ – Conference champion

The 1993 Holy Cross Crusaders football team was an American football team that represented the College of the Holy Cross during the 1993 NCAA Division I-AA football season. Holy Cross finished fourth in the Patriot League.

In their second year under head coach Peter Vaas, the Crusaders compiled a 3–8 record. Todd Araujo, Rob Milanette and Frank Visconti were the team captains.

The Crusaders were outscored 326 to 205 by opponents. Holy Cross' 2–3 conference record placed fourth in the six-team Patriot League standings. It was Holy Cross' first losing season since 1980, and the first time since league play began in 1986 that the Crusaders finished lower than second place.

Holy Cross played its home games at Fitton Field on the college campus in Worcester, Massachusetts.

== Schedule ==
Date	Opponent	Site	Result	Attendance	Source
September 11	at UMass*	McGuirk Stadium; Hadley, MA	L 7–37	12,887	
September 18	Boston University*	Fitton Field; Worcester, MA	L 18–44	6,211	
September 25	at Dartmouth*	Memorial Field; Hanover, NH	W 13–7	4,925	
October 2	at Princeton*	Palmer Stadium; Princeton, NJ	L 0–38	7,520	
October 9	Yale^*	Fitton Field; Worcester, MA	L 27–31	8,077	
October 16	at Harvard*	Harvard Stadium; Boston, MA	L 25–41	11,647	
October 23	at Bucknell	Christy Mathewson–Memorial Stadium; Lewisburg, PA	L 23–33	6,021	
October 30	at Lehigh	Goodman Stadium; Bethlehem, PA	L 10–17	5,431	
November 6	Lafayette^{†}	Fitton Field; Worcester, MA	L 27–52	7,412	
November 13	Colgate	Fitton Field; Worcester, MA	W 27–14	3,771	
November 20	Fordham	Fitton Field; Worcester, MA (rivalry)	W 28–12	3,981	
*Non-conference game; ^{†}Homecoming; ^ Family Weekend
