= 1992 Cornell Big Red football team =

American college football season

1992 Cornell Big Red football
- Conference: Ivy League
- Record: 7–3 (4–3 Ivy)
- Head coach: Jim Hofher (3rd season)
- Captains: John Massy; Scott Oliaro; Jeff Woodring
- Home stadium: Schoellkopf Field

1992 Ivy League football standings
	Conf.					Overall
Team	W		L		T	W		L		T
Dartmouth +	6	–	1	–	0	8	–	2	–	0
Princeton +	6	–	1	–	0	8	–	2	–	0
Penn	5	–	2	–	0	7	–	3	–	0
Cornell	4	–	3	–	0	7	–	3	–	0
Harvard	3	–	4	–	0	3	–	7	–	0
Yale	2	–	5	–	0	4	–	6	–	0
Columbia	2	–	5	–	0	3	–	7	–	0
Brown	0	–	7	–	0	0	–	10	–	0
+ – Conference co-champions

The 1992 Cornell Big Red football team was an American football team that represented Cornell University during the 1992 NCAA Division I-AA football season. Cornell finished fourth in the Ivy League.

In its third season under head coach Jim Hofher, the team compiled a 7–3 record and outscored opponents 263 to 183. Team captains were John Massy, Scott Oliaro and Jeff Woodring.

Cornell's 4–3 conference record placed fourth in the Ivy League standings. The Big Red outscored Ivy opponents 165 to 120.

Cornell played its home games at Schoellkopf Field in Ithaca, New York.

== Schedule ==
Date	Opponent	Site	Result	Attendance	Source
September 19	Princeton	Schoellkopf Field; Ithaca, NY	L 20–22	13,000	
September 26	at Lehigh*	Goodman Stadium; Bethlehem, PA	W 29–23	6,500	
October 3	at Lafayette*	Fisher Field; Easton, PA	W 44–33	8,500	
October 10	at Harvard	Harvard Stadium; Boston, MA	W 31–13	13,346	
October 17	at Colgate*	Colgate Athletic Field; Hamilton, NY (rivalry)	W 25–7	3,500	
October 24	at Dartmouth	Memorial Field; Hanover, NH (rivalry)	W 26–16	14,500	
October 31	Brown	Schoellkopf Field; Ithaca, NY	W 16–6	6,800	
November 7	at Yale	Yale Bowl; New Haven, CT	W 35–14	12,510	
November 14	at Columbia	Wien Stadium; New York, NY (rivalry)	L 30–35	5,495	
November 21	Penn	Schoellkopf Field; Ithaca, NY (rivalry)	L 7–14	5,000	
*Non-conference game
