= 1992 Penn Quakers football team =

American college football season

1992 Penn Quakers football
- Conference: Ivy League
- Record: 7–3 (5–2 Ivy)
- Head coach: Al Bagnoli (1st season)
- Offensive coordinator: George Landis (1st season)
- Defensive coordinator: Mike Toop (1st season)
- Home stadium: Franklin Field

1992 Ivy League football standings
	Conf.					Overall
Team	W		L		T	W		L		T
Dartmouth +	6	–	1	–	0	8	–	2	–	0
Princeton +	6	–	1	–	0	8	–	2	–	0
Penn	5	–	2	–	0	7	–	3	–	0
Cornell	4	–	3	–	0	7	–	3	–	0
Harvard	3	–	4	–	0	3	–	7	–	0
Yale	2	–	5	–	0	4	–	6	–	0
Columbia	2	–	5	–	0	3	–	7	–	0
Brown	0	–	7	–	0	0	–	10	–	0
+ – Conference co-champions

The 1992 Penn Quakers football team represented the University of Pennsylvania in the 1992 NCAA Division I-AA football season.

== Schedule ==
Date	Opponent	Site	Result	Attendance	Source
September 19	at Dartmouth	Memorial Field; Hanover, NH	L 17–36	8,219	
September 26	at Colgate*	Franklin Field; Philadelphia, PA	W 24–0	8,933	
October 3	at Fordham*	Coffey Field; Bronx, NY	W 13–10	4,933	
October 10	No. 10 William & Mary*	Franklin Field; Philadelphia, PA	L 19–21	9,685	
October 17	Columbia	Franklin Field; Philadelphia, PA	W 34–21	8,867	
October 24	at Brown	Brown Stadium; Providence, RI	W 38–0	10,250	
October 31	Yale^{†}	Franklin Field; Philadelphia, PA	W 13–10	17,893	
November 7	at Princeton	Palmer Stadium; Princeton, NJ (rivalry)	L 14–20	17,421	
November 14	Harvard	Franklin Field; Philadelphia, PA (rivalry)	W 21–19	21,626	
November 21	at Cornell	Schoellkopf Field; Ithaca, NY (rivalry)	W 14–7	5,000	
*Non-conference game; ^{†}Homecoming; Rankings from NCAA Division I-AA Football Committee Poll released prior to the game

== Roster ==
1992 Penn Quakers football team roster
Players
Coaches
Offense

Pos.	#	Name	Class
RB	30	Ken Andrejko	Jr
QB	17	Mike Barthlow	Jr
WR	12	Mike Baker	Sr
WR	3	Bill Cobb	Jr
WR	19	Jared DeLancey	Jr
OL	71	Peter Giannakoulis	So
WR	5	Tony Hernandez	Sr
OL	72	Joe Hoffmann	Sr
OL	79	Chris Kawa	Sr
QB	14	Jim McGeehan	Jr
TE	89	Cache Miller	Sr
QB	11	Jeff Murphy	Jr
WR	23	Joe Reda	Jr
OL	77	Erick Trombley	Sr
OL	55	Bill Whalen	So

Defense

Pos.	#	Name	Class
LB	37	Andy Berlin	Jr
DE	58	David Betten	Sr
DB	1	Adam Bianchl	Jr
DE	50	Sean Boyle	Sr
LB	59	Jim Flannery	Sr
LB	98	Scott Hauncher	Sr
DL	97	Chris Johnson	So
DL	94	Kevin Keating	So
DB	18	Joe Kim	Sr
DE	40	JC Lee	So
DE	92	Matt O'Connell	Sr
LB	53	Woody Palk	So
DL	46	Luke Parker	So
DE	66	John Scherpf	Sr
DL	96	Matt Ulizio	Sr
DL	99	David Vernon	Sr
DE	44	Jonah Yokubaitis	Jr

Special teams

Pos.	#	Name	Class
P	16	Rob Sims	Sr

Head coach

- Al Bagnoli

Coordinators/assistant coaches

Legend

- (C) Team captain
- (S) Suspended
- (I) Ineligible
- Injured
- Redshirt
