= 1992 Columbia Lions football team =

American college football season

1992 Columbia Lions football
- Conference: Ivy League
- Record: 3–7 (2–5 Ivy)
- Head coach: Ray Tellier (4th season)
- Defensive coordinator: Mike Donnelly (1st season)
- Captain: Des Werthman
- Home stadium: Wien Stadium

1992 Ivy League football standings
	Conf.					Overall
Team	W		L		T	W		L		T
Dartmouth +	6	–	1	–	0	8	–	2	–	0
Princeton +	6	–	1	–	0	8	–	2	–	0
Penn	5	–	2	–	0	7	–	3	–	0
Cornell	4	–	3	–	0	7	–	3	–	0
Harvard	3	–	4	–	0	3	–	7	–	0
Yale	2	–	5	–	0	4	–	6	–	0
Columbia	2	–	5	–	0	3	–	7	–	0
Brown	0	–	7	–	0	0	–	10	–	0
+ – Conference co-champions

The 1992 Columbia Lions football team was an American football team that represented Columbia University during the 1992 NCAA Division I-AA football season. Columbia tied for second-to-last in the Ivy League.

In their fourth season under head coach Ray Tellier, the Lions compiled a 3–7 record and were outscored 286 to 205. Des Werthman was the team captain.

The Lions' 2–5 conference record tied for sixth in the Ivy League standings. Columbia was outscored 214 to 136 by Ivy opponents.

Columbia played its homes games at Lawrence A. Wien Stadium in Upper Manhattan, in New York City.

== Schedule ==
Date	Opponent	Site	Result	Attendance	Source
September 19	Harvard	Wien Stadium; New York, NY	L 20–27	5,750	
September 26	at Fordham*	Coffey Field; Bronx, NY (rivalry)	W 18–9	3,521	
October 3	Colgate*	Wien Stadium; New York, NY	L 29–34	4,645	
October 10	Bucknell*	Wien Stadium; New York, NY	L 22–29	5,835	
October 17	at Penn	Franklin Field; Philadelphia, PA	L 21–34	8,867	
October 24	at Yale	Yale Bowl; New Haven, CT	L 0–23	14,569	
October 31	Princeton^{†}	Wien Stadium; New York, NY	L 7–34	9,335	
November 7	at Dartmouth	Memorial Field; Hanover, NH	L 19–38	2,907	
November 14	Cornell	Wien Stadium; New York, NY (rivalry)	W 35–30	5,495	
November 21	Brown	Wien Stadium; New York, NY	W 34–28	3,610	
*Non-conference game; ^{†}Homecoming
