= 1992 Yale Bulldogs football team =

American college football season

1992 Yale Bulldogs football
- Conference: Ivy League
- Record: 4–6 (2–5 Ivy)
- Head coach: Carmen Cozza (28th season)
- Defensive coordinator: Don Brown (4th season)
- Home stadium: Yale Bowl

1992 Ivy League football standings
	Conf.					Overall
Team	W		L		T	W		L		T
Dartmouth +	6	–	1	–	0	8	–	2	–	0
Princeton +	6	–	1	–	0	8	–	2	–	0
Penn	5	–	2	–	0	7	–	3	–	0
Cornell	4	–	3	–	0	7	–	3	–	0
Harvard	3	–	4	–	0	3	–	7	–	0
Yale	2	–	5	–	0	4	–	6	–	0
Columbia	2	–	5	–	0	3	–	7	–	0
Brown	0	–	7	–	0	0	–	10	–	0
+ – Conference co-champions

The 1992 Yale Bulldogs football team represented Yale University in the 1992 NCAA Division I-AA football season. The Bulldogs were led by 28th-year head coach Carmen Cozza, played their home games at the Yale Bowl and finished tied for sixth place in the Ivy League with a 2–5 record, 4–6 overall.

== Schedule ==
Date	Opponent	Site	Result	Attendance	Source
September 19	at Brown	Brown Stadium; Providence, RI	W 22–17	14,150	
September 26	Holy Cross*	Yale Bowl; New Haven, CT	W 7–3	5,951	
October 3	at Connecticut*	Memorial Stadium; Storrs, CT	L 20–40	12,104	
October 10	Fordham*	Yale Bowl; New Haven, CT	W 31–12	11,264	
October 17	at Dartmouth	Memorial Field; Hanover, NH	L 27–39	13,017	
October 24	Columbia	Yale Bowl; New Haven, CT	W 23–0	14,569	
October 31	at Penn	Franklin Field; Philadelphia, PA	L 10–31	17,893	
November 7	Cornell	Yale Bowl; New Haven, CT	L 14–35	12,510	
November 14	Princeton	Yale Bowl; New Haven, CT (rivalry)	L 7–36	16,450	
November 21	at Harvard	Harvard Stadium; Boston, MA (The Game)	L 0–14	31,500	
*Non-conference game

== Roster ==
1992 Yale Bulldogs football team roster
Players			Coaches
Offense: Pos. / # / Name / Class; QB / 7 / Chris Hetherington / Fr	Defense: Pos. / # / Name / Class	Special teams: Pos. / # / Name / Class	Head coach: Carmen Cozza; Coordinators/assistant coaches Legend: (C) Team captain; (S) Suspended; (I) Ineligible; Injured; Redshirt
