= 1993 Lafayette Leopards football team =

American college football season

1993 Lafayette Leopards football
- Conference: Patriot League
- Record: 5–4–2 (3–1–1 Patriot)
- Head coach: Bill Russo (13th season)
- Captains: Chris Flood; Pete Ohnegian; Dave Pyne; Mark Reardon
- Home stadium: Fisher Field

1993 Patriot League football standings
	Conf.					Overall
Team	W		L		T	W		L		T
Lehigh $	4	–	1	–	0	7	–	4	–	0
Lafayette	3	–	1	–	1	5	–	4	–	2
Bucknell	3	–	2	–	0	4	–	7	–	0
Holy Cross	2	–	3	–	0	3	–	8	–	0
Colgate	1	–	3	–	1	3	–	7	–	1
Fordham	1	–	4	–	0	1	–	10	–	0
$ – Conference champion

The 1993 Lafayette Leopards football team was an American football team that represented Lafayette College during the 1993 NCAA Division I-AA football season. Lafayette finished second in the Patriot League.

In their 13th year under head coach Bill Russo, the Leopards compiled a 5–4–2 record. Chris Flood, Pete Ohnegian, Dave Pyne and Mark Reardon were the team captains.

The Leopards outscored opponents 270 to 214. Lafayette's 3–1–1 conference record placed second in the six-team Patriot League standings.

Lafayette played its home games at Fisher Field on College Hill in Easton, Pennsylvania.

== Schedule ==
Date	Opponent	Site	Result	Attendance	Source
September 11	Bucknell	Fisher Field; Easton, PA	W 31–14	4,833	
September 18	at Buffalo*	University at Buffalo Stadium; Amherst, NY	W 29–15	6,329	
September 25	Princeton*	Fisher Field; Easton, PA	L 7–21	8,049	
October 2	at Harvard*	Harvard Stadium; Boston, MA	L 16–21	10,112	
October 9	at Columbia*	Wien Stadium; New York, NY	W 58–6	3,080	
October 16	Hofstra*	Fisher Field; Easton, PA	T 17–17	5,117	
October 23	Fordham*	Fisher Field; Easton, PA	W 27–12	8,712	
October 30	Colgate	Fisher Field; Easton, PA	T 7–7	3,877	
November 6	at Holy Cross	Fitton Field; Worcester, MA	W 52–27	7,412	
November 13	at Army*	Michie Stadium; West Point, NY	L 12–35	32,701	
November 20	at Lehigh	Goodman Stadium; Bethlehem, PA (The Rivalry)	L 14–39	15,412	
*Non-conference game
