= 1993 Harvard Crimson football team =

American college football season

1993 Harvard Crimson football
- Conference: Ivy League
- Record: 3–7 (1–6 Ivy)
- Head coach: Joe Restic (23rd season)
- Captain: Brian Ramer
- Home stadium: Harvard Stadium

1993 Ivy League football standings
	Conf.					Overall
Team	W		L		T	W		L		T
No. 16 Penn $	7	–	0	–	0	10	–	0	–	0
Dartmouth	6	–	1	–	0	7	–	3	–	0
Princeton	5	–	2	–	0	8	–	2	–	0
Brown	3	–	4	–	0	4	–	6	–	0
Cornell	3	–	4	–	0	4	–	6	–	0
Yale	2	–	5	–	0	3	–	7	–	0
Harvard	1	–	6	–	0	3	–	7	–	0
Columbia	1	–	6	–	0	2	–	8	–	0
+ – Conference co-champions; Rankings from The Sports Network poll

The 1993 Harvard Crimson football team was an American football team that represented Harvard University during the 1993 NCAA Division I-AA football season. Harvard tied for last in the Ivy League.

In their 23rd and final year under head coach Joe Restic, the Crimson compiled a 3–7 record and were outscored 279 to 233. Brian Ramer was the team captain.

Harvard's 1–6 conference record tied for seventh (and worst) in the Ivy League standings. The Crimson were outscored 193 to 154 by Ivy opponents.

Harvard played its home games at Harvard Stadium in the Allston neighborhood of Boston, Massachusetts.

== Schedule ==
Date	Opponent	Site	Result	Attendance	Source
September 18	Columbia	Harvard Stadium; Boston, MA	W 30–3	8,448	
September 25	at No. 20 William & Mary*	Zable Stadium; Williamsburg, VA	L 17–45	14,314	
October 2	Lafayette*	Harvard Stadium; Boston, MA	W 21–16	10,112	
October 9	at Cornell	Schoellkopf Field; Ithaca, NY	L 0–27	6,092	
October 16	Holy Cross*	Harvard Stadium; Boston, MA	W 41–25	11,647	
October 23	Princeton	Harvard Stadium; Boston, MA (rivalry)	L 10–21	19,309	
October 30	at Dartmouth	Memorial Field; Hanover, NH (rivalry)	L 34–39	11,030	
November 6	at Brown	Brown Stadium; Providence, RI	L 29–43	6,129	
November 13	No. 17 Penn	Harvard Stadium; Boston, MA (rivalry)	L 20–27	8,950	
November 20	at Yale	Yale Bowl; New Haven, CT (The Game)	L 31–33	33,776	
*Non-conference game; Rankings from The Sports Network Poll released prior to the game
