= 1993 Brown Bears football team =

American college football season

1993 Brown Bears football
- Conference: Ivy League
- Record: 4–6 (3–4 Ivy)
- Head coach: Mickey Kwiatkowski (4th season)
- Defensive coordinator: Jim Fleming (1st season)
- Captains: Todd Hunter; Walton Smith
- Home stadium: Brown Stadium

1993 Ivy League football standings
| | Conf. | | | | | Overall |
| Team | W | | L | | T | W | | L | | T |
|---|---|---|---|---|---|---|---|---|---|---|
| No. 16 Penn $ | 7 | – | 0 | – | 0 | 10 | – | 0 | – | 0 |
| Dartmouth | 6 | – | 1 | – | 0 | 7 | – | 3 | – | 0 |
| Princeton | 5 | – | 2 | – | 0 | 8 | – | 2 | – | 0 |
| Brown | 3 | – | 4 | – | 0 | 4 | – | 6 | – | 0 |
| Cornell | 3 | – | 4 | – | 0 | 4 | – | 6 | – | 0 |
| Yale | 2 | – | 5 | – | 0 | 3 | – | 7 | – | 0 |
| Harvard | 1 | – | 6 | – | 0 | 3 | – | 7 | – | 0 |
| Columbia | 1 | – | 6 | – | 0 | 2 | – | 8 | – | 0 |
+ – Conference co-champions; Rankings from The Sports Network poll

The 1993 Brown Bears football team was an American football team that represented Brown University during the 1993 NCAA Division I-AA football season. Brown tied for fourth in the Ivy League.

In their fourth and final season under head coach Mickey Kwiatkowski, the Bears compiled a 4–6 record and were outscored 267 to 190. Todd Hunter and Walton Smith were the team captains.

The Bears' 3–4 conference record tied for fourth place in the Ivy League standings. They were outscored 183 to 127 by Ivy opponents.

Brown played its home games at Brown Stadium in Providence, Rhode Island.

== Schedule ==
| Date | Opponent | Site | Result | Attendance | Source |
|---|---|---|---|---|---|
| September 18 | at Yale | Yale Bowl; New Haven, CT | W 12–3 | 7,967 | |
| September 25 | at Lehigh* | Goodman Stadium; Bethlehem, PA | L 35–42 | 9,264 | |
| October 2 | Rhode Island* | Brown Stadium; Providence, RI (rivalry) | L 7–30 | 4,429 | |
| October 9 | Princeton | Brown Stadium; Providence, RI | L 16–34 | 3,571 | |
| October 16 | Bucknell* | Brown Stadium; Providence, RI | W 21–12 | 3,653 | |
| October 23 | at No. 25 Penn | Franklin Field; Philadelphia, PA | L 9–34 | 19,121 | |
| October 30 | Cornell | Brown Stadium; Providence, RI | L 3–21 | 2,174 | |
| November 6 | Harvard | Brown Stadium; Providence, RI | W 43–29 | 6,129 | |
| November 13 | at Dartmouth | Memorial Field; Hanover, NH | L 16–39 | 5,913 | |
| November 20 | Columbia | Brown Stadium; Providence, RI | W 28–23 | 2,420 | |
*Non-conference game; Rankings from The Sports Network Poll released prior to the game
