= 1993 Yale Bulldogs football team =

American college football season

1993 Yale Bulldogs football
- Conference: Ivy League
- Record: 3–7 (2–5 Ivy)
- Head coach: Carmen Cozza (29th season)
- Defensive coordinator: Dick Hopkins (1st season)
- Base defense: 5–2
- Home stadium: Yale Bowl

1993 Ivy League football standings
	Conf.					Overall
Team	W		L		T	W		L		T
No. 16 Penn $	7	–	0	–	0	10	–	0	–	0
Dartmouth	6	–	1	–	0	7	–	3	–	0
Princeton	5	–	2	–	0	8	–	2	–	0
Brown	3	–	4	–	0	4	–	6	–	0
Cornell	3	–	4	–	0	4	–	6	–	0
Yale	2	–	5	–	0	3	–	7	–	0
Harvard	1	–	6	–	0	3	–	7	–	0
Columbia	1	–	6	–	0	2	–	8	–	0
+ – Conference co-champions; Rankings from The Sports Network poll

The 1993 Yale Bulldogs football team represented Yale University in the 1993 NCAA Division I-AA football season. The Bulldogs were led by 29th-year head coach Carmen Cozza, played their home games at the Yale Bowl and finished in sixth place in the Ivy League with a 2–5 record, 3–7 overall.

== Schedule ==
Date	Opponent	Site	Result	Attendance	Source
September 18	Brown	Yale Bowl; New Haven, CT	L 3–12	7,967	
September 25	Connecticut*	Yale Bowl; New Haven, CT	L 14–25	10,410	
October 2	at UCF*	Florida Citrus Bowl; Orlando, FL	L 28-42	23,489	
October 9	at Holy Cross*	Fitton Field; Worcester, MA	W 31–27	8,077	
October 16	Dartmouth	Yale Bowl; New Haven, CT	L 14–31	18,316	
October 23	at Columbia	Wien Stadium; New York, NY	W 35–28	5,352	
October 30	Penn	Yale Bowl; New Haven, CT	L 7–48	7,249	
November 6	at Cornell	Schoellkopf Field; Ithaca, NY	L 0–21	9,453	
November 13	at Princeton	Palmer Stadium; Princeton, NJ (rivalry)	L 7–28	17,899	
November 20	Harvard	Yale Bowl; New Haven, CT (The Game)	W 33–31	33,776	
*Non-conference game
