= 1992 Harvard Crimson football team =

American college football season

1992 Harvard Crimson football
- Conference: Ivy League
- Record: 3–7 (3–4 Ivy)
- Head coach: Joe Restic (22nd season)
- Captain: Robb Hirsch
- Home stadium: Harvard Stadium

1992 Ivy League football standings
	Conf.					Overall
Team	W		L		T	W		L		T
Dartmouth +	6	–	1	–	0	8	–	2	–	0
Princeton +	6	–	1	–	0	8	–	2	–	0
Penn	5	–	2	–	0	7	–	3	–	0
Cornell	4	–	3	–	0	7	–	3	–	0
Harvard	3	–	4	–	0	3	–	7	–	0
Yale	2	–	5	–	0	4	–	6	–	0
Columbia	2	–	5	–	0	3	–	7	–	0
Brown	0	–	7	–	0	0	–	10	–	0
+ – Conference co-champions

The 1992 Harvard Crimson football team was an American football team that represented Harvard University during the 1992 NCAA Division I-AA football season. The Crimson finished fifth in the Ivy League.

In their 20th year under head coach Joe Restic, the Crimson compiled a 3–7 record and were outscored 240 to 167. Robb Hirsch was the team captain.

Harvard's 3–4 conference record placed fifth in the Ivy League standings. The Crimson were outscored 143 to 115 by Ivy opponents.

Harvard played its home games at Harvard Stadium in the Allston neighborhood of Boston, Massachusetts.

== Schedule ==
Date	Opponent	Site	Result	Attendance	Source
September 19	at Columbia	Wien Stadium; New York, NY	W 27–20	5,750	
September 26	No. 14 William & Mary*	Harvard Stadium; Boston, MA	L 16–36	5,794	
October 3	at Holy Cross*	Fitton Field; Worcester, MA	L 7–30	10,601	
October 10	Cornell	Harvard Stadium; Boston, MA	L 13–31	13,346	
October 17	at Lafayette*	Fisher Field; Easton, PA	L 29–31	7,859	
October 24	at Princeton	Palmer Stadium; Princeton, NJ (rivalry)	L 6–21	19,250	
October 31	Dartmouth	Harvard Stadium; Boston, MA	L 7–31	12,850	
November 7	Brown	Harvard Stadium; Boston, MA	W 29–19	5,350	
November 14	at Penn	Franklin Field; Philadelphia, PA	L 19–21	21,626	
November 21	Yale	Harvard Stadium; Boston, MA (The Game)	W 14–0	31,500	
*Non-conference game; Rankings from NCAA Division I-AA Football Committee Poll released prior to the game
