= 1992 Brown Bears football team =

American college football season

1992 Brown Bears football
- Conference: Ivy League
- Record: 0–10 (0–7 Ivy)
- Head coach: Mickey Kwiatkowski (3rd season)
- Offensive coordinator: Dave Barton (2nd season)
- Defensive coordinator: Jim Bernhardt (3rd season)
- Captains: Brett Brown; Chris Gordon
- Home stadium: Brown Stadium

1992 Ivy League football standings
	Conf.					Overall
Team	W		L		T	W		L		T
Dartmouth +	6	–	1	–	0	8	–	2	–	0
Princeton +	6	–	1	–	0	8	–	2	–	0
Penn	5	–	2	–	0	7	–	3	–	0
Cornell	4	–	3	–	0	7	–	3	–	0
Harvard	3	–	4	–	0	3	–	7	–	0
Yale	2	–	5	–	0	4	–	6	–	0
Columbia	2	–	5	–	0	3	–	7	–	0
Brown	0	–	7	–	0	0	–	10	–	0
+ – Conference co-champions

The 1992 Brown Bears football team was an American football team that represented Brown University during the 1992 NCAA Division I-AA football season. Brown, winless, finished last in the Ivy League.

In their third season under head coach Mickey Kwiatkowski, the Bears compiled an 0–10 record and were outscored 333 to 156. Brett Brown and Chris Gordon were the team captains.

The Bears' winless (0–7) conference record placed last in the Ivy League standings. They were outscored 218 to 112 by Ivy opponents.

Brown played its home games at Brown Stadium in Providence, Rhode Island.

== Schedule ==
Date	Opponent	Site	Result	Attendance	Source
September 19	Yale	Brown Stadium; Providence, RI	L 17–22	14,150	
September 26	at Bucknell*	Christy Mathewson–Memorial Stadium; Lewisburg, PA	L 14–33	5,582	
October 3	at No. 10 William & Mary*	Zable Stadium; Williamsburg, VA	L 6–51	13,012	
October 10	at Princeton	Palmer Stadium; Princeton, NJ	L 14–28	14,275	
October 17	Lehigh*	Brown Stadium; Providence, RI	L 24–31	3,400	
October 24	Penn	Brown Stadium; Providence, RI	L 0–38	10,250	
October 31	at Cornell	Schoellkopf Field; Ithaca, NY	L 6–16	6,800	
November 7	at Harvard	Harvard Stadium; Boston, MA	L 19–29	5,350	
November 14	Dartmouth	Brown Stadium; Providence, RI	L 28–51	3,100	
November 21	at Columbia	Wien Stadium; New York, NY	L 28–34	3,610	
*Non-conference game; Rankings from NCAA Division I-AA Football Committee Poll released prior to the game
