= 1992 Holy Cross Crusaders football team =

American college football season

1992 Holy Cross Crusaders football
- Conference: Patriot League
- Record: 6–5 (4–1 Patriot)
- Head coach: Peter Vaas (1st season)
- Captains: Marcus Duckworth; Ron Hooey; Tom McDonald; John Powell
- Home stadium: Fitton Field

1992 Patriot League football standings
	Conf.					Overall
Team	W		L		T	W		L		T
Lafayette $	5	–	0	–	0	8	–	3	–	0
Holy Cross	4	–	1	–	0	6	–	5	–	0
Colgate	2	–	3	–	0	4	–	7	–	0
Lehigh	2	–	3	–	0	3	–	8	–	0
Bucknell	1	–	4	–	0	4	–	7	–	0
Fordham	1	–	4	–	0	1	–	9	–	0
$ – Conference champion

The 1992 Holy Cross Crusaders football team was an American football team that represented the College of the Holy Cross during the 1992 NCAA Division I-AA football season. Holy Cross finished second in the Patriot League.

In their first year under head coach Peter Vaas, the Crusaders compiled a 6–5 record. Marcus Duckworth, Ron Hooey, Tom McDonald and John Powell were the team captains.

The Crusaders outscored opponents 175 to 153. Their 4–1 conference record placed second in the six-team Patriot League standings.

The Crusaders were ranked No. 18 in the preseason national Division I-AA rankings, and despite a season-opening loss rose to No. 14 in the poll released September 14, but further losses dropped them out of the top 20 for the rest of the season.

Holy Cross played its home games at Fitton Field on the college campus in Worcester, Massachusetts.

== Schedule ==
Date	Opponent	Site	Result	Attendance	Source
September 12	at Army*	Michie Stadium; West Point, NY	L 7–17	32,736	
September 19	UMass*	Fitton Field; Worcester, MA	L 3–7	10,802	
September 26	at Yale*	Yale Bowl; New Haven, CT	L 3–7	5,951	
October 3	Harvard*	Fitton Field; Worcester, MA	W 30–7	10,601	
October 10	Dartmouth*	Fitton Field; Worcester, MA	L 0–48	7,151	
October 17	Princeton^{†}*	Fitton Field; Worcester, MA	W 10–7	8,114	
October 24	Bucknell^	Fitton Field; Worcester, MA	W 27–12	12,401	
October 31	Lehigh	Fitton Field; Worcester, MA	W 28–25	5,321	
November 7	at Lafayette	Fisher Field; Easton, PA	L 6–15	5,333	
November 14	at Colgate	Andy Kerr Stadium; Hamilton, NY	W 18–17	1,300	
November 21	Fordham	Fitton Field; Worcester, MA (rivalry)	W 21–13	7,242	
*Non-conference game; ^{†}Homecoming; ^ Family Weekend
