= 1992 Lafayette Leopards football team =

American college football season

1992 Lafayette Leopards football

Patriot League champion
- Conference: Patriot League
- Record: 8–3 (5–0 Patriot)
- Head coach: Bill Russo (12th season)
- Captains: Tom Kirchoff; Kevin McManus
- Home stadium: Fisher Field

1992 Patriot League football standings
	Conf.					Overall
Team	W		L		T	W		L		T
Lafayette $	5	–	0	–	0	8	–	3	–	0
Holy Cross	4	–	1	–	0	6	–	5	–	0
Colgate	2	–	3	–	0	4	–	7	–	0
Lehigh	2	–	3	–	0	3	–	8	–	0
Bucknell	1	–	4	–	0	4	–	7	–	0
Fordham	1	–	4	–	0	1	–	9	–	0
$ – Conference champion

The 1992 Lafayette Leopards football team was an American football team that represented Lafayette College during the 1992 NCAA Division I-AA football season. The Leopards won the Patriot League championship.

In their 12th year under head coach Bill Russo, the Leopards compiled an 8–3 record. Tom Kirchoff and Kevin McManus were the team captains.

The Leopards outscored opponents 382 to 282. Their undefeated (5–0) conference record placed first in the six-team Patriot League standings.

Lafayette played its home games at Fisher Field on College Hill in Easton, Pennsylvania.

== Schedule ==
Date	Opponent	Site	Result	Attendance	Source
September 12	Hofstra*	Fisher Field; Easton, PA	W 21–14	4,521	
September 19	Buffalo*	Fisher Field; Easton, PA	W 49–28	6,823	
September 26	at Princeton*	Palmer Stadium; Princeton, NJ	L 35–38	6,820	
October 3	at Cornell*	Schoellkopf Field; Ithaca, NY	L 33–44	8,500	
October 10	at Army*	Michie Stadium; West Point, NY	L 36–38	39,642	
October 17	Harvard^{†}*	Fisher Field; Easton, PA	W 31–29	7,859	
October 24	at Fordham	Coffey Field; Bronx, NY	W 44–21	4,101	
October 31	at Colgate	Andy Kerr Stadium; Hamilton, NY	W 37–28		
November 7	Holy Cross	Fisher Field; Easton, PA	W 15–6	5,333	
November 14	at Bucknell	Christy Mathewson–Memorial Stadium; Lewisburg, PA	W 49–7		
November 21	Lehigh	Fisher Field; Easton, PA (The Rivalry)	W 32–29	13,725	
*Non-conference game; ^{†}Homecoming
