= 1993 Columbia Lions football team =

American college football season

1993 Columbia Lions football
- Conference: Ivy League
- Record: 2–8 (1–6 Ivy)
- Head coach: Ray Tellier (5th season)
- Defensive coordinator: Mike Donnelly (2nd season)
- Captain: Adam Yeloushan
- Home stadium: Wien Stadium

1993 Ivy League football standings
	Conf.					Overall
Team	W		L		T	W		L		T
No. 16 Penn $	7	–	0	–	0	10	–	0	–	0
Dartmouth	6	–	1	–	0	7	–	3	–	0
Princeton	5	–	2	–	0	8	–	2	–	0
Brown	3	–	4	–	0	4	–	6	–	0
Cornell	3	–	4	–	0	4	–	6	–	0
Yale	2	–	5	–	0	3	–	7	–	0
Harvard	1	–	6	–	0	3	–	7	–	0
Columbia	1	–	6	–	0	2	–	8	–	0
+ – Conference co-champions; Rankings from The Sports Network poll

The 1993 Columbia Lions football team was an American football team that represented Columbia University during the 1993 NCAA Division I-AA football season. Columbia tied for last in the Ivy League.

In their fifth season under head coach Ray Tellier, the Lions compiled a 2–8 record and were outscored 294 to 155. Adam Yeloushan was the team captain.

The Lions' 1–6 conference record tied for seventh (and worst) in the Ivy League standings. Columbia was outscored 209 to 118 by Ivy opponents.

Columbia played its homes games at Lawrence A. Wien Stadium in Upper Manhattan, in New York City.

== Schedule ==
Date	Opponent	Site	Result	Attendance	Source
September 18	at Harvard	Harvard Stadium; Boston, MA	L 3–30	8,448	
September 25	Fordham*	Wien Stadium; New York, NY (rivalry)	W 7–0	3,325	
October 2	at Colgate*	Andy Kerr Stadium; Hamilton, NY	L 24–27		
October 9	Lafayette*	Wien Stadium; New York, NY	L 6–58	3,080	
October 16	Penn^{†}	Wien Stadium; New York, NY	L 7–36	8,605	
October 23	Yale	Wien Stadium; New York, NY	L 28–35	5,352	
October 30	at Princeton	Palmer Stadium; Princeton, NJ	L 3–14	5,176	
November 6	Dartmouth	Wien Stadium; New York, NY	L 25–42	4,485	
November 13	at Cornell	Schoellkopf Field; Ithaca, NY (rivalry)	W 29–24	5,196	
November 20	at Brown	Brown Stadium; Providence, RI	L 23–28	2,420	
*Non-conference game; ^{†}Homecoming
