= 1993 Penn Quakers football team =

American college football season

1993 Penn Quakers football

Ivy League champion
- Conference: Ivy League

Ranking
- Sports Network: No. 16
- Record: 10–0 (7–0 Ivy)
- Head coach: Al Bagnoli (2nd season)
- Offensive coordinator: George Landis (2nd season)
- Defensive coordinator: Mike Toop (2nd season)
- Home stadium: Franklin Field

1993 Ivy League football standings
	Conf.					Overall
Team	W		L		T	W		L		T
No. 16 Penn $	7	–	0	–	0	10	–	0	–	0
Dartmouth	6	–	1	–	0	7	–	3	–	0
Princeton	5	–	2	–	0	8	–	2	–	0
Brown	3	–	4	–	0	4	–	6	–	0
Cornell	3	–	4	–	0	4	–	6	–	0
Yale	2	–	5	–	0	3	–	7	–	0
Harvard	1	–	6	–	0	3	–	7	–	0
Columbia	1	–	6	–	0	2	–	8	–	0
+ – Conference co-champions; Rankings from The Sports Network poll

The 1993 Penn Quakers football team represented the University of Pennsylvania in the 1993 NCAA Division I-AA football season. Penn went undefeated and won the Ivy League championship. Penn averaged 20,313 fans per game.

== Schedule ==
Date	Opponent	Rank	Site	Result	Attendance	Source
September 18	Dartmouth		Franklin Field; Philadelphia, PA	W 10–6	13,488	
September 25	at Bucknell*		Christy Mathewson–Memorial Stadium; Lewisburg, PA	W 42–12	5,758	
October 2	Fordham*		Franklin Field; Philadelphia, PA	W 34–30	10,529	
October 9	at Colgate*		Andy Kerr Stadium; Hamilton, NY	W 30–12	3,000	
October 16	at Columbia		Wien Stadium; New York, NY	W 36–7	8,605	
October 23	Brown	No. 25	Franklin Field; Philadelphia, PA	W 34–9	19,121	
October 30	at Yale	No. 23	Yale Bowl; New Haven, CT	W 48–7	7,249	
November 6	Princeton	No. 21	Franklin Field; Philadelphia, PA (rivalry)	W 30–14	35,810	
November 13	at Harvard	No. 17	Harvard Stadium; Boston, MA (rivalry)	W 21–19	8,950	
November 20	Cornell	No. 15	Franklin Field; Philadelphia, PA (rivalry)	W 17–14	22,618	
*Non-conference game; Rankings from The Sports Network Poll released prior to the game

== Roster ==
1993 Penn Quakers football team roster
Players
Coaches
Offense

Pos.	#	Name	Class
RB	8	Joey Allen	So
WR	45	Chris Brassell	Sr
OT	65	Chris Brauser	So
G	73	Frank Caccuro	Sr
WR	3	Billy Cobb	Sr
QB	16	Mark DeRosa	Fr
OT	63	Jon Freeman	So
C	71	Pete Giannakoulis	Jr
TE	88	Ben Holman	Sr
QB	14	Jimmy McGeehan	Sr
G	54	Ed Michvech	Sr
RB	22	Terrance Stokes	Jr
TE	84	Matt Tonelli	So
WR	81	Mike Kroll	Sr
WR	--	Jared Delancy	Sr
WR	2	Miles Macick	So
WR	23	Joe Reda	Sr

Defense

Pos.	#	Name	Class
CB	6	Kevin Allen	So
LB	37	Andy Berlin	Sr
DE	58	Dave Betten	Sr
DT	98	Gabe Capodanno	Jr
CB	9	Jamie Daniels	Jr
LB	48	Kevin DeLuca	Jr
LB	42	Pat Goodwillie	Jr
DT	97	Chris Johnson	Jr
DT	40	J.C. Lee	Jr
SS	21	Jim Magallanes	Sr
FS	11	Sheldon Philip-Guide	So
DT	75	Brent Ruhkamp	Sr
DE	52	Mike Silvey	Jr
DE	27	Michael Turner	Jr
WR	25	Jerel Hopkins	Sr
DT	71	Tommy Dolan	Sr
DT	61	Kelly Tolton	Sr
LB	--	Parnell Clitus	Sr
SS	--	Nick Morris	Jr
DB	10	Brian Verona	Sr
DE	--	Mike Juliano	Jr

Special teams

Pos.	#	Name	Class

Head coach

- Al Bagnoli

Coordinators/assistant coaches

Dan "Lake" Staffieri

Legend

- (C) Team captain
- (S) Suspended
- (I) Ineligible
- Injured
- Redshirt
