= 1993 NCAA Division I-AA Football Championship Game =

College football game

1993 NCAA Division I-AA Football Championship
- I-AA National Championship Game
| Youngstown State Penguins | Marshall Thundering Herd |
| (12–2) | (11–3) |
| Independent | SoCon |
| 17 | 5 |
| Head coach: Jim Tressel | Head coach: Jim Donnan |
| TSN / Seed; 7 / – | TSN / Seed; 9 / – |
| | 1 | 2 | 3 | 4 | Total |
|---|---|---|---|---|---|
| Youngstown State | 17 | 0 | 0 | 0 | 17 |
| Marshall | 0 | 0 | 3 | 2 | 5 |
- Date: December 18, 1993
- Season: 1993
- Stadium: Marshall University Stadium
- Location: Huntington, West Virginia
- Favorite: Marshall by 2
- Referee: Steve Newman (Gateway)
- Attendance: 29,218

United States TV coverage
- Network: CBS Sports
- Announcers: Sean McDonough (play-by-play), Dan Jiggetts (color), Jim Gray (sideline)

The 1993 NCAA Division I-AA Football Championship Game was a postseason college football game between the Youngstown State Penguins and the Marshall Thundering Herd. The game was played on December 18, 1993, at Marshall University Stadium in Huntington, West Virginia. The culminating game of the 1993 NCAA Division I-AA football season, it was won by Youngstown State, 17–5. This was the third consecutive season that these two teams met in the championship game.

== Teams ==
The participants of the Championship Game were the finalists of the 1993 I-AA Playoffs, which began with a 16-team bracket. The site of the title game, Marshall University Stadium, had been predetermined months earlier.

=== Youngstown State Penguins ===
Youngstown State finished their regular season with a 9–2 record. Unseeded in the tournament, the Penguins defeated UCF, top-seed Georgia Southern, and Idaho to reach the final. This was the third appearance, both consecutively and overall, for Youngstown State in a Division I-AA championship game, having won in 1991 and having lost in 1992.

=== Marshall Thundering Herd ===
Marshall finished their regular season with an 8–3 record (5–2 in conference). Also unseeded, the Thundering Herd defeated Howard, Delaware, and Troy State to reach the final. This was the fourth appearance overall, and third consecutively, for Marshall in a Division I-AA championship game, having won in 1992 and having lost in 1987 and 1991.

== Game summary ==
The only touchdowns in the game came during Youngstown State's first three plays from scrimmage. After Marshall's game opening kickoff went out of bounds, Youngstown State scored from their own 35-yard-line on two running plays. At the end of Marshall's ensuing possession, the Herd's punter was tackled inside their own 10-yard-line, and Youngstown State scored their second rushing touchdown on the next play. The only scoring throughout the remainder of the game was a field goal by each team, and Youngstown State gave up a safety late in the fourth quarter.

=== Scoring summary ===
Scoring summary

| Quarter | Time | Drive | | | Team | Scoring information | Score | |
| Quarter | Time | Plays | Yards | TOP | Team | Scoring information | YSU | MU |
|---|---|---|---|---|---|---|---|---|
| 1 | 14:27 | 2 | 65 | 0:33 | YSU | Darnell Clark 50-yard touchdown run, Jeff Wilkins kick good | 7 | 0 |
| 1 | 12:21 | 1 | 5 | 0:03 | YSU | Tamron Smith 5-yard touchdown run, Wilkins kick good | 14 | 0 |
| 1 | 1:53 | | | | YSU | 19-yard field goal by Wilkins | 17 | 0 |
| 3 | 3:34 | | | | MU | 27-yard field goal by Willy Merrick | 17 | 3 |
| 4 | 2:52 | | | | MU | Safety: YSU punter Wilkins stepped out of end zone | 17 | 5 |
| "TOP" = time of possession. For other American football terms, see Glossary of American football. | | | | | | | 17 | 5 |

=== Game statistics ===
| | 1 | 2 | 3 | 4 | Total |
|---|---|---|---|---|---|
| Penguins | 17 | 0 | 0 | 0 | 17 |
| Thundering Herd | 0 | 0 | 3 | 2 | 5 |

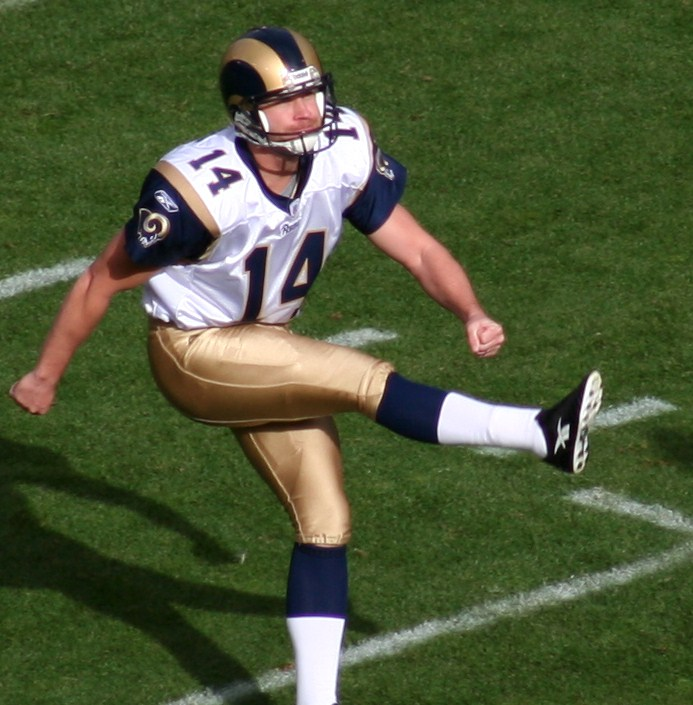
Youngstown State kicker Jeff Wilkins

| Statistics | YSU | MU |
|---|---|---|
| First downs | 16 | 16 |
| Plays–yards | 63–295 | 64–256 |
| Rushes–yards | 55–220 | 35–49 |
| Passing yards | 75 | 207 |
| Passing: comp–att–int | 7–8–0 | 19–29–2 |
| Time of possession | 34:26 | 25:34 |

| Team | Category | Player | Statistics |
|---|---|---|---|
| Youngstown State | Passing | Mark Brungard | 7–8, 75 yds |
| Youngstown State | Rushing | Tamron Smith | 24 car, 109 yds, 1 TD |
| Youngstown State | Receiving | Don Zwisler | 2 rec, 38 yds |
| Marshall | Passing | Todd Donnan | 19–29, 207 yds, 2 INT |
| Marshall | Rushing | Chris Parker | 17 car, 47 yds |
| Marshall | Receiving | Will Brown | 7 rec, 94 yds |
