= 1993 Marist Red Foxes football team =

American college football season

1993 Marist Red Foxes football
- Conference: Independent
- Record: 5–5
- Head coach: Jim Parady (2nd season)
- Home stadium: Leonidoff Field

1993 NCAA Division I-AA independents football standings
| | Conf. | | | Overall |
| Team | W | L | T | W | | L | | T |
|---|---|---|---|---|---|---|---|---|
| No. 1 Troy State ^ | | – | | 11 | – | 0 | – | 1 |
| Youngstown State ^ | | – | | 10 | – | 2 | – | 0 |
| UAB | | – | | 9 | – | 2 | – | 0 |
| Wagner | | – | | 9 | – | 2 | – | 0 |
| No. 12 UCF ^ | | – | | 9 | – | 3 | – | 0 |
| No. 24 Towson State | | – | | 8 | – | 2 | – | 0 |
| No. 19 Western Kentucky | | – | | 8 | – | 3 | – | 0 |
| Hofstra | | – | | 6 | – | 3 | – | 1 |
| Saint Mary's | | – | | 6 | – | 3 | – | 1 |
| Davidson | | – | | 6 | – | 4 | – | 0 |
| Central Connecticut State | | – | | 5 | – | 5 | – | 0 |
| Liberty | | – | | 5 | – | 5 | – | 0 |
| Marist | | – | | 5 | – | 5 | – | 0 |
| Samford | | – | | 5 | – | 6 | – | 0 |
| Duquesne | | – | | 4 | – | 6 | – | 0 |
| Saint Francis (PA) | | – | | 3 | – | 7 | – | 0 |
| Charleston Southern | | – | | 3 | – | 8 | – | 0 |
| Monmouth | | – | | 2 | – | 5 | – | 0 |
| Buffalo | | – | | 1 | – | 10 | – | 0 |
^ – NCAA Division I-AA playoff participant; Rankings from The Sports Network poll

The 1993 Marist Red Foxes football team was an American football team that represented Marist College as an independent during the 1993 NCAA Division I-AA football season. Led by second-year head coach Jim Parady, the team compiled a 5–5 record.

== Schedule ==
| Date | Opponent | Site | Result | Attendance | Source |
|---|---|---|---|---|---|
| September 11 | at Saint Francis (PA) | Pine Bowl; Loretto, PA | W 16–7 | | |
| September 18 | Pace | Leonidoff Field; Poughkeepsie, NY | W 47–19 | 1,125 | |
| September 25 | C. W. Post | Leonidoff Field; Poughkeepsie, NY | L 10–31 | | |
| October 1 | at St. John's | Redmen Field; Queens, NY | L 30–31 | | |
| October 9 | at Central Connecticut State | Arute Field; New Britain, CT | W 33–31 | | |
| October 16 | Duquesne^{†} | Leonidoff Field; Poughkeepsie, NY | W 21–12 | 2,847 | |
| October 23 | RPI | Leonidoff Field; Poughkeepsie, NY | L 7–14 | 1,208 | |
| October 30 | Wagner | Leonidoff Field; Poughkeepsie, NY | L 6–22 | | |
| November 6 | at Iona | Mazzella Field; New Rochelle, NY | L 24–27 | 1,200 | |
| November 13 | at Siena | Heritage Park; Colonie, NY | W 28–0 | | |
^{†}Homecoming
