= 1993 Monmouth Hawks football team =

American college football season

1993 Monmouth Hawks football
- Conference: Independent
- Record: 2–5
- Head coach: Kevin Callahan (1st season)
- Offensive coordinator: Terry Dow (1st season)
- Offensive scheme: Multiple
- Defensive coordinator: Andy Bobik (1st season)
- Base defense: 4–3
- Home stadium: Kessler Field

1993 NCAA Division I-AA independents football standings
	Conf.			Overall
Team	W	L	T	W		L		T
No. 1 Troy State ^		–		11	–	0	–	1
Youngstown State ^		–		10	–	2	–	0
UAB		–		9	–	2	–	0
Wagner		–		9	–	2	–	0
No. 12 UCF ^		–		9	–	3	–	0
No. 24 Towson State		–		8	–	2	–	0
No. 19 Western Kentucky		–		8	–	3	–	0
Hofstra		–		6	–	3	–	1
Saint Mary's		–		6	–	3	–	1
Davidson		–		6	–	4	–	0
Central Connecticut State		–		5	–	5	–	0
Liberty		–		5	–	5	–	0
Marist		–		5	–	5	–	0
Samford		–		5	–	6	–	0
Duquesne		–		4	–	6	–	0
Saint Francis (PA)		–		3	–	7	–	0
Charleston Southern		–		3	–	8	–	0
Monmouth		–		2	–	5	–	0
Buffalo		–		1	–	10	–	0
^ – NCAA Division I-AA playoff participant; Rankings from The Sports Network poll

The 1993 Monmouth Hawks football team represented Monmouth University in the 1993 NCAA Division I-AA football season as an independent. This year was the program first year of competition. The Hawks were led by first-year head coach Kevin Callahan and played their home games at Kessler Field. They finished the season with a record of 2–5.

== Schedule ==
Date	Time	Opponent	Site	Result	Attendance	Source
September 11	1:30 p.m.	at Stonehill	Chieftain Stadium; Easton, MA	L 8–13		
September 25	1:00 p.m.	Sacred Heart	Kessler Field; West Long Branch, NJ	L 0–12	5,135	
October 2	1:00 p.m.	Saint Peter's	Kessler Field; West Long Branch, NJ	W 44–42		
October 16	1:00 p.m.	at Saint Francis (PA)	Pine Bowl; Loretto, PA	L 14–25		
October 23	1:00 p.m.	Hartwick^{†}	Kessler Field; West Long Branch, NJ	L 13–17	6,300	
November 6	1:00 p.m.	Wagner	Kessler Field; West Long Branch, NJ	L 7–13		
November 13	1:30 p.m.	at Albright	Shirk Stadium; Reading, PA	W 15–14		
^{†}Homecoming; All times are in Eastern time
