= 1993 Delaware State Hornets football team =

American college football season

1993 Delaware State Hornets football
- Conference: Mid-Eastern Athletic Conference
- Record: 6–5 (4–2 MEAC)
- Head coach: Bill Collick (9th season)
- Home stadium: Alumni Stadium

1993 Mid-Eastern Athletic Conference football standings
	Conf.					Overall
Team	W		L		T	W		L		T
No. 8 Howard $^	6	–	0	–	0	11	–	1	–	0
South Carolina State	4	–	2	–	0	8	–	3	–	0
Delaware State	4	–	2	–	0	6	–	5	–	0
No. 21 North Carolina A&T	3	–	3	–	0	8	–	3	–	0
Florida A&M	3	–	3	–	0	5	–	6	–	0
Morgan State	1	–	5	–	0	3	–	8	–	0
Bethune–Cookman	0	–	6	–	0	1	–	10	–	0
$ – Conference champion; ^ – NCAA Division I-AA playoff participant; Rankings from The Sports Network poll

The 1993 Delaware State Hornets football team represented Delaware State College (now known as Delaware State University) as a member of the Mid-Eastern Athletic Conference (MEAC) during the 1993 NCAA Division I-AA football season. Led by ninth-year head coach Bill Collick, the Hornets compiled an overall record of 6–5, with a mark of 4–2 in conference play, and finished tied for second in the MEAC.

== Schedule ==
Date	Opponent	Site	Result	Attendance	Source
September 4	vs. Fayetteville State*	Baynard Stadium; Wilmington, DE (Wilmington Classic)	W 31–28		
September 11	Cheyney*	Alumni Stadium; Dover, DE	W 44–12		
September 18	at Towson State*	Minnegan Stadium; Towson, MD	L 14–31	1,320	
October 2	Bethune–Cookman	Alumni Stadium; Dover, DE	W 55–26	3,671	
October 9	at Youngstown State*	Stambaugh Stadium; Youngstown, OH	L 28–42		
October 16	at Florida A&M	Bragg Memorial Stadium; Tallahassee, FL	W 18–14	11,767	
October 23	Morgan State	Alumni Stadium; Dover, DE	W 65–42		
October 30	at South Carolina State	Oliver C. Dawson Stadium; Orangeburg, SC	L 15–38	6,727	
November 6	at No. 12 North Carolina A&T	Aggie Stadium; Greensboro, NC	W 25–19	8,125	
November 13	Liberty*	Alumni Stadium; Dover, DE	L 43–47		
November 20	No. 8 Howard	Alumni Stadium; Dover, DE	L 33–53	7,268	
*Non-conference game; Rankings from The Sports Network Poll released prior to the game
