= 1993 NCAA Division I-AA football season =

American college football season

1993 NCAA Division I-AA season

Regular season
- Number of teams: 118
- Duration: August–November
- Payton Award: Doug Nussmeier (QB, Idaho)

Playoff
- Duration: November 27–December 18
- Championship date: December 18, 1993
- Championship site: Marshall University Stadium; Huntington, West Virginia
- Champion: Youngstown State

NCAA Division I-AA football seasons
- «1992 1994»

The 1993 NCAA Division I-AA football season, part of college football in the United States organized by the National Collegiate Athletic Association at the Division I-AA level, began in August 1993, and concluded with the 1993 NCAA Division I-AA Football Championship Game on December 18, 1993, at Marshall University Stadium in Huntington, West Virginia. The Youngstown State Penguins won their second I-AA championship, defeating the Marshall Thundering Herd by a score of 17−5. It was the third consecutive year that Marshall and Youngstown State faced off in the I-AA title game.

== Conference changes and new programs ==
- A 1991 NCAA rule change required athletic programs to maintain all of their sports at the same division level by the 1993 season. In order to comply, 28 Division I programs with football teams at the Division II and Division III levels were forced to upgrade their programs to the Division I level, and all of them (at least initially) chose Division I-AA as their new football home.
- The rule change led directly to the establishment of the Pioneer Football League, a non-scholarship football conference at the Division I-AA level with six founding members, all of which had played in Division II or III: Butler, Dayton, Drake, Evansville, San Diego, and Valparaiso.
- It also led to the creation of the American West Conference, initially a football-only conference at the Division I-AA level with five founding members, all formerly in Division II: UC Davis, Cal Poly, Cal State Northridge, Sacramento State, and Southern Utah.
- The Metro Atlantic Athletic Conference, an existing Division I conference, also began sponsoring football in order to accommodate new I-AA football programs that had formerly operated at the Division II or III level.

School	1992 Conference	1993 Conference
Buffalo	D-III Independent	I-AA Independent
Butler	MIFC (D-II)	Pioneer (I-AA)
California–Davis	Northern California (D-II)	American West+
Cal Poly	Western (D-II)	American West (I-AA)
Cal State Northridge	Western (D-II)	American West (I-AA)
Canisius	D-III Independent	MAAC (I-AA)
Central Connecticut State	D-II Independent	I-AA Independent
Charleston Southern	D-III Independent	I-AA Independent
Davidson	D-III Independent	I-AA Independent
Dayton	D-III Independent	Pioneer (I-AA)
Drake	D-III Independent	Pioneer (I-AA)
Duquesne	D-III Independent	I-AA Independent
Evansville	D-III Independent	Pioneer (I-AA)
Georgetown	D-III Independent	MAAC (I-AA)
Georgia Southern	I-AA Independent	Southern
Iona	Liberty (D-III)	MAAC (I-AA)
James Madison	I-AA Independent	Yankee
Marist	Liberty (D-III)	I-AA Independent
Monmouth	New Program	I-AA Independent
Northeastern	I-AA Independent	Yankee
Sacramento State	Western (D-II)	American West (I-AA)
St. Francis (PA)	D-III Independent	I-AA Independent
St. John's (NY)	Liberty (D-III)	MAAC (I-AA)
St. Mary's (CA)	D-II Independent	I-AA Independent
St. Peter's	D-III Independent	MAAC (I-AA)
San Diego	D-III Independent	Pioneer (I-AA)
Siena	D-III Independent	MAAC (I-AA)
Southern Utah	Western (D-II)	American West (I-AA)
Troy State	D-II Independent	I-AA Independent
UAB	D-III Independent	I-AA Independent
Valparaiso	MIFC (D-II)	Pioneer (I-AA)
Wagner	Liberty (D-III)	I-AA Independent
William & Mary	I-AA Independent	Yankee

+ The UC Davis Aggies, although a member of the new American West Conference, were listed in Division II polls, and participated in the Division II postseason.

== Conference standings ==
1993 American West Conference football standings
	Conf.					Overall
Team	W		L		T	W		L		T
No. 7 UC Davis +^	3	–	1	–	0	10	–	2	–	0
Southern Utah +	3	–	1	–	0	3	–	7	–	1
Sacramento State	2	–	2	–	0	4	–	6	–	0
Cal Poly	1	–	3	–	0	6	–	4	–	0
Cal State Northridge	1	–	3	–	0	4	–	6	–	0
+ – Conference co-champions; ^ – NCAA Division II playoff participant; Although UC Davis was a conference member, they participated in NCAA Division II polls and postseason.; Rankings from NCAA Division II Football Committee poll

1993 Big Sky Conference football standings
	Conf.					Overall
Team	W		L		T	W		L		T
No. 3 Montana $^	7	–	0	–	0	10	–	2	–	0
No. 11 Idaho ^	5	–	2	–	0	11	–	3	–	0
No. 20 Eastern Washington	5	–	2	–	0	7	–	3	–	0
Montana State	4	–	3	–	0	7	–	4	–	0
Northern Arizona	3	–	4	–	0	7	–	4	–	0
Weber State	3	–	4	–	0	7	–	4	–	0
Boise State	1	–	6	–	0	3	–	8	–	0
Idaho State	0	–	7	–	0	0	–	11	–	0
$ – Conference champion; ^ – NCAA Division I-AA playoff participant; Rankings from The Sports Network poll

1993 Gateway Football Conference standings
	Conf.					Overall
Team	W		L		T	W		L		T
No. 13 Northern Iowa $^	5	–	1	–	0	8	–	4	–	0
Southwest Missouri State	4	–	2	–	0	7	–	4	–	0
Western Illinois	4	–	2	–	0	4	–	7	–	0
Illinois State	2	–	3	–	1	6	–	4	–	1
Eastern Illinois	2	–	3	–	1	3	–	7	–	1
Indiana State	2	–	4	–	0	4	–	7	–	0
Southern Illinois	1	–	5	–	0	2	–	9	–	0
$ – Conference champion; ^ – NCAA Division I-AA playoff participant; Rankings from The Sports Network poll

1993 Ivy League football standings
	Conf.					Overall
Team	W		L		T	W		L		T
No. 16 Penn $	7	–	0	–	0	10	–	0	–	0
Dartmouth	6	–	1	–	0	7	–	3	–	0
Princeton	5	–	2	–	0	8	–	2	–	0
Brown	3	–	4	–	0	4	–	6	–	0
Cornell	3	–	4	–	0	4	–	6	–	0
Yale	2	–	5	–	0	3	–	7	–	0
Harvard	1	–	6	–	0	3	–	7	–	0
Columbia	1	–	6	–	0	2	–	8	–	0
+ – Conference co-champions; Rankings from The Sports Network poll

1993 Metro Atlantic Athletic Conference football standings
	Conf.					Overall
Team	W		L		T	W		L		T
Iona $	5	–	0	–	0	9	–	2	–	0
Canisius	4	–	1	–	0	5	–	5	–	0
St. John's	3	–	2	–	0	8	–	3	–	0
Georgetown	2	–	3	–	0	4	–	5	–	0
Saint Peter's	1	–	4	–	0	3	–	7	–	0
Siena	0	–	5	–	0	0	–	10	–	0
$ – Conference champion

1993 Mid-Eastern Athletic Conference football standings
	Conf.					Overall
Team	W		L		T	W		L		T
No. 8 Howard $^	6	–	0	–	0	11	–	1	–	0
South Carolina State	4	–	2	–	0	8	–	3	–	0
Delaware State	4	–	2	–	0	6	–	5	–	0
No. 21 North Carolina A&T	3	–	3	–	0	8	–	3	–	0
Florida A&M	3	–	3	–	0	5	–	6	–	0
Morgan State	1	–	5	–	0	3	–	8	–	0
Bethune–Cookman	0	–	6	–	0	1	–	10	–	0
$ – Conference champion; ^ – NCAA Division I-AA playoff participant; Rankings from The Sports Network poll

1993 Ohio Valley Conference football standings
	Conf.					Overall
Team	W		L		T	W		L		T
No. 17 Eastern Kentucky $^	8	–	0	–	0	8	–	4	–	0
No. 22 Tennessee Tech	7	–	1	–	0	8	–	3	–	0
Tennessee–Martin	5	–	3	–	0	6	–	5	–	0
Middle Tennessee	4	–	4	–	0	5	–	6	–	0
Murray State	4	–	4	–	0	4	–	7	–	0
Tennessee State	4	–	4	–	0	4	–	7	–	0
Morehead State	2	–	6	–	0	3	–	8	–	0
Southeast Missouri State	2	–	6	–	0	3	–	8	–	0
Austin Peay	0	–	8	–	0	1	–	10	–	0
$ – Conference champion; ^ – NCAA Division I-AA playoff participant; Rankings from The Sports Network poll

1993 Patriot League football standings
	Conf.					Overall
Team	W		L		T	W		L		T
Lehigh $	4	–	1	–	0	7	–	4	–	0
Lafayette	3	–	1	–	1	5	–	4	–	2
Bucknell	3	–	2	–	0	4	–	7	–	0
Holy Cross	2	–	3	–	0	3	–	8	–	0
Colgate	1	–	3	–	1	3	–	7	–	1
Fordham	1	–	4	–	0	1	–	10	–	0
$ – Conference champion

1993 Pioneer Football League standings
	Conf.			Overall
Team	W		L	W		L
Dayton $	5	–	0	9	–	1
Drake	3	–	2	8	–	2
Butler	3	–	2	4	–	6
Evansville	2	–	3	6	–	4
San Diego	1	–	4	6	–	4
Valparaiso	1	–	4	5	–	5
$ – Conference champion

1993 Southern Conference football standings
	Conf.					Overall
Team	W		L		T	W		L		T
No. 2 Georgia Southern $^	7	–	1	–	0	10	–	3	–	0
No. 9 Marshall ^	6	–	2	–	0	11	–	4	–	0
Western Carolina	5	–	3	–	0	6	–	5	–	0
Furman	4	–	4	–	0	5	–	5	–	1
The Citadel	4	–	4	–	0	7	–	5	–	0
Appalachian State	4	–	4	–	0	4	–	7	–	0
East Tennessee State	3	–	5	–	0	5	–	6	–	0
Chattanooga	2	–	6	–	0	4	–	7	–	0
VMI	1	–	7	–	0	1	–	10	–	0
$ – Conference champion; ^ – NCAA Division I-AA playoff participant; Rankings from The Sports Network poll

1993 Southland Conference football standings
	Conf.					Overall
Team	W		L		T	W		L		T
No. 5 McNeese State $^	7	–	0	–	0	10	–	3	–	0
No. 4 NE Louisiana ^	6	–	1	–	0	9	–	3	–	0
No. 14 Stephen F. Austin ^	5	–	2	–	0	8	–	4	–	0
Northwestern State	3	–	4	–	0	5	–	6	–	0
Sam Houston State	2	–	5	–	0	4	–	7	–	0
North Texas	2	–	5	–	0	4	–	7	–	0
Nicholls State	2	–	5	–	0	3	–	8	–	0
SW Texas State	1	–	6	–	0	2	–	9	–	0
$ – Conference champion; ^ – NCAA Division I-AA playoff participant; Rankings from The Sports Network poll

1993 Southwestern Athletic Conference football standings
	Conf.					Overall
Team	W		L		T	W		L		T
No. 15 Southern $	7	–	0	–	0	11	–	1	–	0
No. 23 Alcorn State	6	–	1	–	0	8	–	3	–	0
Grambling State	4	–	3	–	0	7	–	4	–	0
Jackson State	3	–	3	–	1	5	–	5	–	1
Alabama State	3	–	3	–	1	5	–	4	–	1
Mississippi Valley State	2	–	3	–	2	4	–	4	–	2
Texas Southern	1	–	6	–	0	2	–	9	–	0
Prairie View A&M	0	–	7	–	0	0	–	11	–	0
$ – Conference champion; Rankings from The Sports Network Poll

1993 Yankee Conference football standings
	Conf.					Overall
Team	W		L		T	W		L		T
New England Division
No. 6 Boston University x$^	8	–	0	–	0	12	–	1	–	0
No. 25 UMass	6	–	2	–	0	9	–	2	–	0
Connecticut	5	–	3	–	0	6	–	5	–	0
New Hampshire	4	–	4	–	0	6	–	5	–	0
Rhode Island	2	–	6	–	0	4	–	7	–	0
Maine	0	–	8	–	0	0	–	11	–	0
Mid-Atlantic Division
No. 10 William & Mary x^	7	–	1	–	0	9	–	3	–	0
No. 18 Delaware ^	6	–	2	–	0	9	–	4	–	0
James Madison	4	–	4	–	0	6	–	5	–	0
Richmond	3	–	5	–	0	5	–	6	–	0
Northeastern	2	–	6	–	0	2	–	9	–	0
Villanova	1	–	7	–	0	3	–	8	–	0
$ – Conference champion; x – Division champion/co-champions; ^ – NCAA Division I-AA playoff participant; Rankings from The Sports Network poll

1993 NCAA Division I-AA independents football standings
	Conf.			Overall
Team	W	L	T	W		L		T
No. 1 Troy State ^		–		11	–	0	–	1
Youngstown State ^		–		10	–	2	–	0
UAB		–		9	–	2	–	0
Wagner		–		9	–	2	–	0
No. 12 UCF ^		–		9	–	3	–	0
No. 24 Towson State		–		8	–	2	–	0
No. 19 Western Kentucky		–		8	–	3	–	0
Hofstra		–		6	–	3	–	1
Saint Mary's		–		6	–	3	–	1
Davidson		–		6	–	4	–	0
Central Connecticut State		–		5	–	5	–	0
Liberty		–		5	–	5	–	0
Marist		–		5	–	5	–	0
Samford		–		5	–	6	–	0
Duquesne		–		4	–	6	–	0
Saint Francis (PA)		–		3	–	7	–	0
Charleston Southern		–		3	–	8	–	0
Monmouth		–		2	–	5	–	0
Buffalo		–		1	–	10	–	0
^ – NCAA Division I-AA playoff participant; Rankings from The Sports Network poll

== Conference champions ==
Conference champions

American West Conference – Southern Utah and UC Davis
Big Sky Conference – Montana
Gateway Football Conference – Northern Iowa
Ivy League – Penn
Metro Atlantic Athletic Conference – Iona
Mid-Eastern Athletic Conference – Howard
Ohio Valley Conference – Eastern Kentucky
Patriot League – Lehigh
Pioneer Football League – Dayton
Southern Conference – Georgia Southern
Southland Conference – McNeese State
Southwestern Athletic Conference – Southern
Yankee Conference – Boston University

== Postseason ==
=== NCAA Division I-AA playoff bracket ===
Only the top four teams in the field were seeded, with the NCAA placing others teams in the bracket to avoid early round matchups between teams from the same conference. This was the first season that the NCAA did not use an in-house poll process for I-AA ranking purposes; independent polling by The Sports Network wire service was used. The site of the title game, Marshall University Stadium, had been predetermined months earlier.

First Round; November 27; Campus sites
Eastern Kentucky	12
(1) Georgia Southern*	14
UCF	30
Youngstown State*	56
Northern Iowa	21
(4) Boston University*	27**
Idaho	34'
Northeast Louisiana*	31
Delaware	49
(2) Montana*	48
Howard	14
Marshall*	28*
William & Mary	28
(3) McNeese State*	34
Stephen F. Austin	20
Troy State*	42

Quarterfinals; December 4 Campus sites
(1) Georgia Southern	14
Youngstown State*	34
(4) Boston University	14
Idaho*	21
Delaware	31
Marshall*	34
(3) McNeese State*	28
Troy State	35

Semifinals; December 11; Campus sites
Youngstown State*	35
Idaho	16
Marshall*	24
Troy State	21

National Championship Game; December 18; Marshall University Stadium; Huntington, WV
Youngstown State	17
Marshall	5

* Next to team name denotes host institution
* Next to score denotes overtime period
