= 1993 Saint Mary's Gaels football team =

American college football season

1993 Saint Mary's Gaels football
- Conference: Independent
- Record: 6–3–1
- Head coach: Mike Rasmussen (4th season)
- Home stadium: Saint Mary's Stadium

1993 NCAA Division I-AA independents football standings
	Conf.			Overall
Team	W	L	T	W		L		T
No. 1 Troy State ^		–		11	–	0	–	1
Youngstown State ^		–		10	–	2	–	0
UAB		–		9	–	2	–	0
Wagner		–		9	–	2	–	0
No. 12 UCF ^		–		9	–	3	–	0
No. 24 Towson State		–		8	–	2	–	0
No. 19 Western Kentucky		–		8	–	3	–	0
Hofstra		–		6	–	3	–	1
Saint Mary's		–		6	–	3	–	1
Davidson		–		6	–	4	–	0
Central Connecticut State		–		5	–	5	–	0
Liberty		–		5	–	5	–	0
Marist		–		5	–	5	–	0
Samford		–		5	–	6	–	0
Duquesne		–		4	–	6	–	0
Saint Francis (PA)		–		3	–	7	–	0
Charleston Southern		–		3	–	8	–	0
Monmouth		–		2	–	5	–	0
Buffalo		–		1	–	10	–	0
^ – NCAA Division I-AA playoff participant; Rankings from The Sports Network poll

The 1993 Saint Mary's Gaels football team was an American football team that represented Saint Mary's College of California as an independent during the 1993 NCAA Division I-AA football season. Led by fourth-year head coach Mike Rasmussen, the team compiled a 6–3–1 record.

== Schedule ==
Date	Opponent	Site	Result	Attendance	Source
September 4	at San Francisco State	Cox Stadium; San Francisco, CA	W 27–6	1,153	
September 11	Cal State Hayward	Saint Mary's Stadium; Moraga, CA	W 44–0	2,300	
September 18	at Sonoma State	Cossacks Stadium; Rohnert Park, CA	W 44–23	1,152	
September 25	at Humboldt State	Redwood Bowl; Arcata, CA	W 21–0	2,700	
October 2	Chico State	Saint Mary's Stadium; Moraga, CA	W 27–15	2,702	
October 9	at Sacramento State	Hornet Stadium; Sacramento, CA	W 27–14	3,355	
October 23	Southern Utah	Saint Mary's Stadium; Moraga, CA	T 35–35	3,058	
October 30	No. 8 (D-II) UC Davis	Saint Mary's Stadium; Moraga, CA	L 21–28	5,109	
November 6	at Western New Mexico	Silver City, NM	L 15–42		
November 13	Cal Poly	Saint Mary's Stadium; Moraga, CA	L 37–58	3,381	
Rankings from The Sports Network Poll released prior to the game
