= 1993 Wagner Seahawks football team =

American college football season

1993 Wagner Seahawks football

ECAC–Division I-AA Bowl, W 32–0 vs. Iona
- Conference: Independent
- Record: 9–2
- Head coach: Walt Hameline (13th season)
- Home stadium: Wagner College Stadium

1993 NCAA Division I-AA independents football standings
	Conf.			Overall
Team	W	L	T	W		L		T
No. 1 Troy State ^		–		11	–	0	–	1
Youngstown State ^		–		10	–	2	–	0
UAB		–		9	–	2	–	0
Wagner		–		9	–	2	–	0
No. 12 UCF ^		–		9	–	3	–	0
No. 24 Towson State		–		8	–	2	–	0
No. 19 Western Kentucky		–		8	–	3	–	0
Hofstra		–		6	–	3	–	1
Saint Mary's		–		6	–	3	–	1
Davidson		–		6	–	4	–	0
Central Connecticut State		–		5	–	5	–	0
Liberty		–		5	–	5	–	0
Marist		–		5	–	5	–	0
Samford		–		5	–	6	–	0
Duquesne		–		4	–	6	–	0
Saint Francis (PA)		–		3	–	7	–	0
Charleston Southern		–		3	–	8	–	0
Monmouth		–		2	–	5	–	0
Buffalo		–		1	–	10	–	0
^ – NCAA Division I-AA playoff participant; Rankings from The Sports Network poll

The 1993 Wagner Seahawks football team represented Wagner College in the 1993 NCAA Division I-AA football season. It was their first year competing as an NCAA Division I-AA independent after transitioning from NCAA Division III. The Seahawks were led by 13th-year head coach Walt Hameline and played their home games at Wagner College Stadium. They finished the season 9–2 and won the ECAC–IFC Division I-AA Bowl, beating Iona, 32–0.

== Schedule ==
Date	Opponent	Site	Result	Attendance	Source
September 11	C. W. Post	Fischer Memorial Stadium; Staten Island, NY	W 27–21	3,124	
September 18	St. John's	Fischer Memorial Stadium; Staten Island, NY	W 34–9	2,122	
September 25	Central Connecticut State	Fischer Memorial Stadium; Staten Island, NY	W 22–15	3,984	
October 2	Iona	Fischer Memorial Stadium; Staten Island, NY	L 23–30	2,648	
October 9	at Duquesne	Rooney Field; Pittsburgh, PA	W 27–24		
October 16	at Pace	Pace Stadium; Pleasantville, NY	W 47–10		
October 23	Saint Francis (PA)	Fischer Memorial Stadium; Staten Island, NY	W 31–21		
October 30	at Marist	Leonidoff Field; Poughkeepsie, NY	W 22–6		
November 6	at Monmouth	Kessler Field; West Long Branch, NJ	W 13–7		
November 13	at San Diego	Torero Stadium; San Diego, CA	L 14–44	2,351	
November 20	at Iona	Mazzella Field; New Rochelle, NY (ECAC–Division I-AA Bowl)	W 32–0	1,200	
