= 1993 Davidson Wildcats football team =

American college football season

1993 Davidson Wildcats football
- Conference: Independent
- Record: 6–4
- Head coach: Tim Landis (1st season)
- Home stadium: Richardson Stadium

1993 NCAA Division I-AA independents football standings
	Conf.			Overall
Team	W	L	T	W		L		T
No. 1 Troy State ^		–		11	–	0	–	1
Youngstown State ^		–		10	–	2	–	0
UAB		–		9	–	2	–	0
Wagner		–		9	–	2	–	0
No. 12 UCF ^		–		9	–	3	–	0
No. 24 Towson State		–		8	–	2	–	0
No. 19 Western Kentucky		–		8	–	3	–	0
Hofstra		–		6	–	3	–	1
Saint Mary's		–		6	–	3	–	1
Davidson		–		6	–	4	–	0
Central Connecticut State		–		5	–	5	–	0
Liberty		–		5	–	5	–	0
Marist		–		5	–	5	–	0
Samford		–		5	–	6	–	0
Duquesne		–		4	–	6	–	0
Saint Francis (PA)		–		3	–	7	–	0
Charleston Southern		–		3	–	8	–	0
Monmouth		–		2	–	5	–	0
Buffalo		–		1	–	10	–	0
^ – NCAA Division I-AA playoff participant; Rankings from The Sports Network poll

The 1993 Davidson Wildcats football team was an American football team that represented Davidson College as an independent during the 1993 NCAA Division I-AA football season. Led by first-year head coach Tim Landis, the team compiled a 6–4 record.

== Schedule ==
Date	Opponent	Site	Result	Attendance	Source
September 11	at Sewanee	McGee Field; Sewanee, TN	L 3–7	2,000	
September 18	Rhodes	Richardson Stadium; Davidson, NC	W 41–12		
September 25	at Emory and Henry	Fullerton Field; Emory, VA	L 0–27	3,900	
October 2	at Guilford	Armfield Athletic Center; Greensboro, NC	W 35–24	3,255	
October 9	at Washington and Lee	Wilson Field; Lexington, VA	W 21–14		
October 16	Methodist	Richardson Stadium; Davidson, NC	W 35–7	714	
October 23	Randolph–Macon	Richardson Stadium; Davidson, NC	L 16–21	2,478	
October 30	Hampden–Sydney	Richardson Stadium; Davidson, NC	W 21–14	1,031	
November 6	at Centre	Farris Stadium; Danville, KY	L 31–44		
November 13	Bridgewater	Richardson Stadium; Davidson, NC	W 55–14	650	
