= 1993 Duquesne Dukes football team =

American college football season

1993 Duquesne Dukes football
- Conference: Independent
- Record: 4–6
- Head coach: Greg Gattuso (1st season)
- Home stadium: Arthur J. Rooney Athletic Field

1993 NCAA Division I-AA independents football standings
	Conf.			Overall
Team	W	L	T	W		L		T
No. 1 Troy State ^		–		11	–	0	–	1
Youngstown State ^		–		10	–	2	–	0
UAB		–		9	–	2	–	0
Wagner		–		9	–	2	–	0
No. 12 UCF ^		–		9	–	3	–	0
No. 24 Towson State		–		8	–	2	–	0
No. 19 Western Kentucky		–		8	–	3	–	0
Hofstra		–		6	–	3	–	1
Saint Mary's		–		6	–	3	–	1
Davidson		–		6	–	4	–	0
Central Connecticut State		–		5	–	5	–	0
Liberty		–		5	–	5	–	0
Marist		–		5	–	5	–	0
Samford		–		5	–	6	–	0
Duquesne		–		4	–	6	–	0
Saint Francis (PA)		–		3	–	7	–	0
Charleston Southern		–		3	–	8	–	0
Monmouth		–		2	–	5	–	0
Buffalo		–		1	–	10	–	0
^ – NCAA Division I-AA playoff participant; Rankings from The Sports Network poll

The 1993 Duquesne Dukes football team represented Duquesne University as an independent during the 1993 NCAA Division I-AA football season. Led by first-year head coach Greg Gattuso, the Dukes compiled an overall record of 4–6.

== Schedule ==
Date	Opponent	Site	Result	Attendance	Source
September 11	Canisius	Arthur J. Rooney Athletic Field; Pittsburgh, PA	W 16–12	7,422	
September 18	Bethany (WV)	Arthur J. Rooney Athletic Field; Pittsburgh, PA	W 13–10		
September 25	at Thiel	Greenville, PA	W 28–0		
October 2	at Gannon	Erie, PA	L 0–7		
October 9	Wagner	Arthur J. Rooney Athletic Field; Pittsburgh, PA	L 24–27		
October 16	at Marist	Leonidoff Field; Poughkeepsie, NY	L 12–21	2,847	
October 23	Mercyhurst	Arthur J. Rooney Athletic Field; Pittsburgh, PA	L 7–24		
October 30	St. John's	Arthur J. Rooney Athletic Field; Pittsburgh, PA	L 12–37		
November 6	at Saint Francis (PA)	Pine Bowl; Loretto, PA	W 35–34		
November 13	at Central Connecticut State	Arute Field; New Britain, CT	L 22–41		
