= 1993 Hofstra Flying Dutchmen football team =

American college football season

1993 Hofstra Flying Dutchmen football
- Conference: Independent
- Record: 6–3–1
- Head coach: Joe Gardi (4th season)
- Home stadium: Hofstra Stadium

1993 NCAA Division I-AA independents football standings
	Conf.			Overall
Team	W	L	T	W		L		T
No. 1 Troy State ^		–		11	–	0	–	1
Youngstown State ^		–		10	–	2	–	0
UAB		–		9	–	2	–	0
Wagner		–		9	–	2	–	0
No. 12 UCF ^		–		9	–	3	–	0
No. 24 Towson State		–		8	–	2	–	0
No. 19 Western Kentucky		–		8	–	3	–	0
Hofstra		–		6	–	3	–	1
Saint Mary's		–		6	–	3	–	1
Davidson		–		6	–	4	–	0
Central Connecticut State		–		5	–	5	–	0
Liberty		–		5	–	5	–	0
Marist		–		5	–	5	–	0
Samford		–		5	–	6	–	0
Duquesne		–		4	–	6	–	0
Saint Francis (PA)		–		3	–	7	–	0
Charleston Southern		–		3	–	8	–	0
Monmouth		–		2	–	5	–	0
Buffalo		–		1	–	10	–	0
^ – NCAA Division I-AA playoff participant; Rankings from The Sports Network poll

The 1993 Hofstra Flying Dutchmen football team was an American football team that represented Hofstra University as an independent during the 1993 NCAA Division I-AA football season. Led by fourth-year head coach Joe Gardi, the team compiled a 6–3–1 record.

== Schedule ==
Date	Opponent	Site	Result	Attendance	Source
September 4	Butler	Hofstra Stadium; Hempstead, NY	W 20–19		
September 11	at Rhode Island	Meade Stadium; Kingston, RI	L 32–37		
September 18	at Lehigh	Goodman Stadium; Bethlehem, PA	L 24–31	5,820	
September 25	No. 24 Illinois State	Hofstra Stadium; Hempstead, NY	L 6–16	1,837	
October 2	Buffalo	Hofstra Stadium; Hempstead, NY	W 28–20	1,437	
October 9	Bucknell	Hofstra Stadium; Hempstead, NY	W 28–0	4,127	
October 16	at Lafayette	Fisher Stadium; Easton, PA	T 17–17	5,117	
October 30	Towson State	Hofstra Stadium; Hempstead, NY	W 40–12	897	
November 13	at Fordham	Coffey Field; Bronx, NY	W 49–22	1,967	
November 20	at Maine	Alumni Field; Orono, ME	W 27–15		
Rankings from The Sports Network Poll released prior to the game
