= 1993 Bethune–Cookman Wildcats football team =

American college football season

1993 Bethune–Cookman Wildcats football
- Conference: Mid-Eastern Athletic Conference
- Record: 1–10, 1 win forfeited (0–6 MEAC, 1 win forfeited)
- Head coach: Sylvester Collins (2nd season; first 9 games); Tyrone McGriff (final 2 games)
- Home stadium: Municipal Stadium

1993 Mid-Eastern Athletic Conference football standings
| | Conf. | | | | | Overall |
| Team | W | | L | | T | W | | L | | T |
|---|---|---|---|---|---|---|---|---|---|---|
| No. 8 Howard $^ | 6 | – | 0 | – | 0 | 11 | – | 1 | – | 0 |
| South Carolina State | 4 | – | 2 | – | 0 | 8 | – | 3 | – | 0 |
| Delaware State | 4 | – | 2 | – | 0 | 6 | – | 5 | – | 0 |
| No. 21 North Carolina A&T | 3 | – | 3 | – | 0 | 8 | – | 3 | – | 0 |
| Florida A&M | 3 | – | 3 | – | 0 | 5 | – | 6 | – | 0 |
| Morgan State | 1 | – | 5 | – | 0 | 3 | – | 8 | – | 0 |
| Bethune–Cookman | 0 | – | 6 | – | 0 | 1 | – | 10 | – | 0 |
$ – Conference champion; ^ – NCAA Division I-AA playoff participant; Rankings from The Sports Network poll

The 1993 Bethune–Cookman Wildcats football team represented Bethune–Cookman College (now known as Bethune–Cookman University) as a member of the Mid-Eastern Athletic Conference (MEAC) during the 1993 NCAA Division I-AA football season. The Wildcats were led by second-year head coach Sylvester Collins for the first nine games and by interim head coach Tyrone McGriff for their final two games. In December 1993, Bethune–Cookman was forced to forfeit their wins against Morgan State and Johnson C. Smith as a result of playing an ineligible player.

== Schedule ==
| Date | Opponent | Site | Result | Attendance | Source |
|---|---|---|---|---|---|
| September 4 | vs. Knoxville* | Gator Bowl; Jacksonville, FL (Gateway Classic) | L 31–33 | 6,423 | |
| September 11 | Morgan State | Municipal Stadium; Daytona Beach, FL | L 41–17 (forfeit) | 6,794 | |
| September 18 | Johnson C. Smith* | Municipal Stadium; Daytona Beach, FL | L 30–7 (forfeit) | | |
| September 25 | at No. 13 Samford* | Seibert Stadium; Homewood, AL | L 10–27 | | |
| October 2 | at Delaware State | Alumni Stadium; Dover, DE | L 26–55 | 3,671 | |
| October 9 | No. 25 Howard | Municipal Stadium; Daytona Beach, FL | L 7–21 | 1,188 | |
| October 16 | South Carolina State | Municipal Stadium; Daytona Beach, FL | L 27–40 | | |
| October 23 | No. 11 UCF* | Municipal Stadium; Daytona Beach, FL | L 14–34 | 5,500 | |
| October 30 | No. 14 North Carolina A&T | Municipal Stadium; Daytona Beach, FL | L 14–29 | 8,173 | |
| November 13 | at Norfolk State* | Foreman Field; Norfolk, VA | W 33–31 | 9,046 | |
| November 27 | vs. Florida A&M | Tampa Stadium; Tampa, FL (Florida Classic) | L 21–35 | 31,624 | |
*Non-conference game; Rankings from The Sports Network Poll released prior to the game
