= 1993 Saint Francis Red Flash football team =

American college football season

1993 Saint Francis Red Flash football
- Conference: Independent
- Record: 3–7
- Head coach: Frank Pergolizzi (5th season)
- Home stadium: Pine Bowl

1993 NCAA Division I-AA independents football standings
	Conf.			Overall
Team	W	L	T	W		L		T
No. 1 Troy State ^		–		11	–	0	–	1
Youngstown State ^		–		10	–	2	–	0
UAB		–		9	–	2	–	0
Wagner		–		9	–	2	–	0
No. 12 UCF ^		–		9	–	3	–	0
No. 24 Towson State		–		8	–	2	–	0
No. 19 Western Kentucky		–		8	–	3	–	0
Hofstra		–		6	–	3	–	1
Saint Mary's		–		6	–	3	–	1
Davidson		–		6	–	4	–	0
Central Connecticut State		–		5	–	5	–	0
Liberty		–		5	–	5	–	0
Marist		–		5	–	5	–	0
Samford		–		5	–	6	–	0
Duquesne		–		4	–	6	–	0
Saint Francis (PA)		–		3	–	7	–	0
Charleston Southern		–		3	–	8	–	0
Monmouth		–		2	–	5	–	0
Buffalo		–		1	–	10	–	0
^ – NCAA Division I-AA playoff participant; Rankings from The Sports Network poll

The 1993 Saint Francis Red Flash football team represented Saint Francis College (now known as Saint Francis University) as an independent during the 1993 NCAA Division I-AA football season. Led by fifth-year head coach Frank Pergolizzi, the Red Flash compiled an overall record of 3–7.

== Schedule ==
Date	Opponent	Site	Result	Source
September 4	Gannon	Pine Bowl; Loretto, PA	L 0–20	
September 11	Marist	Pine Bowl; Loretto, PA	L 7–16	
September 18	at Sacred Heart	Campus Field; Fairfield, CT	W 16–14	
September 25	at Saint Peter's	JFK Stadium; Hoboken, NJ	L 14–17	
October 2	at Central Connecticut State	Arute Field; New Britain, CT	W 29–27	
October 16	Monmouth	Pine Bowl; Loretto, PA	W 25–14	
October 23	at Wagner	Fischer Memorial Stadium; Staten Island, NY	L 21–31	
October 30	at Canisius	Demske Sports Complex; Buffalo, NY	L 10–28	
November 6	Duquesne	Pine Bowl; Loretto, PA	L 34–35	
November 13	at Mercyhurst	Erie, PA	L 26–39	
