= 1993 Charleston Southern Buccaneers football team =

American college football season

1993 Charleston Southern Buccaneers football
- Conference: Independent
- Record: 3–8
- Head coach: David Dowd (3rd season)
- Home stadium: Buccaneer Field

1993 NCAA Division I-AA independents football standings
	Conf.			Overall
Team	W	L	T	W		L		T
No. 1 Troy State ^		–		11	–	0	–	1
Youngstown State ^		–		10	–	2	–	0
UAB		–		9	–	2	–	0
Wagner		–		9	–	2	–	0
No. 12 UCF ^		–		9	–	3	–	0
No. 24 Towson State		–		8	–	2	–	0
No. 19 Western Kentucky		–		8	–	3	–	0
Hofstra		–		6	–	3	–	1
Saint Mary's		–		6	–	3	–	1
Davidson		–		6	–	4	–	0
Central Connecticut State		–		5	–	5	–	0
Liberty		–		5	–	5	–	0
Marist		–		5	–	5	–	0
Samford		–		5	–	6	–	0
Duquesne		–		4	–	6	–	0
Saint Francis (PA)		–		3	–	7	–	0
Charleston Southern		–		3	–	8	–	0
Monmouth		–		2	–	5	–	0
Buffalo		–		1	–	10	–	0
^ – NCAA Division I-AA playoff participant; Rankings from The Sports Network poll

The 1993 Charleston Southern Buccaneers football team represented Charleston Southern University as an independent during the 1993 NCAA Division I-AA football season. Led by third-year head coach David Dowd, the Buccaneers compiled a record of 3–8. Charleston Southern played home games at Buccaneer Field in North Charleston, South Carolina.

== Schedule ==
Date	Opponent	Site	Result	Attendance	Source
September 4	at Morgan State	Hughes Stadium; Baltimore, MD	L 20–54	4,517	
September 11	Presbyterian	Buccaneer Field; North Charleston, SC	W 17–16	4,000	
September 18	at South Carolina State	Oliver C. Dawson Stadium; Orangeburg, SC	L 10–44	4,217	
September 25	at Towson State	Minnegan Stadium; Towson, MD	L 14–52		
October 2	at No. 5 Troy State	Veterans Memorial Stadium; Troy, AL	L 0–56	7,200	
October 9	at Newberry	Setzler Field; Newberry, SC	W 15–10		
October 16	Lees–McRae	Buccaneer Field; North Charleston, SC	W 24–17		
October 23	UAB	Buccaneer Field; North Charleston, SC	L 20–48	1,550	
October 30	at Liberty	Liberty University Stadium; Lynchburg, VA	L 6–42	7,000	
November 6	at Apprentice	Apprentice Athletic Field; Newport News, VA	L 0–21	321	
November 13	Wofford	Buccaneer Field; North Charleston, SC	L 9–21	1,800	
Rankings from The Sports Network Poll released prior to the game
