= 1993 Central Connecticut State Blue Devils football team =

American college football season

1993 Central Connecticut State Blue Devils football
- Conference: Independent
- Record: 5–5
- Head coach: Sal Cintorino (2nd season)
- Home stadium: Arute Field

1993 NCAA Division I-AA independents football standings
	Conf.			Overall
Team	W	L	T	W		L		T
No. 1 Troy State ^		–		11	–	0	–	1
Youngstown State ^		–		10	–	2	–	0
UAB		–		9	–	2	–	0
Wagner		–		9	–	2	–	0
No. 12 UCF ^		–		9	–	3	–	0
No. 24 Towson State		–		8	–	2	–	0
No. 19 Western Kentucky		–		8	–	3	–	0
Hofstra		–		6	–	3	–	1
Saint Mary's		–		6	–	3	–	1
Davidson		–		6	–	4	–	0
Central Connecticut State		–		5	–	5	–	0
Liberty		–		5	–	5	–	0
Marist		–		5	–	5	–	0
Samford		–		5	–	6	–	0
Duquesne		–		4	–	6	–	0
Saint Francis (PA)		–		3	–	7	–	0
Charleston Southern		–		3	–	8	–	0
Monmouth		–		2	–	5	–	0
Buffalo		–		1	–	10	–	0
^ – NCAA Division I-AA playoff participant; Rankings from The Sports Network poll

The 1993 Central Connecticut State Blue Devils football team was an American football team that represented Central Connecticut State University as an independent during the 1993 NCAA Division I-AA football season. Led by second-year head coach Sal Cintorino, the team compiled a 5–5 record.

== Schedule ==
Date	Opponent	Site	Result	Attendance	Source
September 11	at Towson State	Minnegan Stadium; Towson, MD	L 7–42	1,384	
September 18	at Iona	Mazzella Field; New Rochelle, NY	W 24–13		
September 25	at Wagner	Fischer Memorial Stadium; Staten Island, NY	L 15–22	3,984	
October 2	Saint Francis (PA)	Arute Field; New Britain, CT	L 27–29		
October 9	Marist	Arute Field; New Britain, CT	L 31–33		
October 16	Springfield^{†}	Arute Field; New Britain, CT	W 20–11		
October 23	C. W. Post	Arute Field; New Britain, CT	L 18–72		
October 30	at Southern Connecticut State	Jess Dow Field; New Haven, CT	W 28–14		
November 6	Saint Peter's	Arute Field; New Britain, CT	W 9–7		
November 13	Duquesne	Arute Field; New Britain, CT	W 41–22		
^{†}Homecoming
