= 1993 South Carolina State Bulldogs football team =

American college football season

1993 South Carolina State Bulldogs football

Heritage Bowl, L 0–11 vs. Southern
- Conference: Mid-Eastern Athletic Conference
- Record: 8–4 (4–2 MEAC)
- Head coach: Willie Jeffries (11th season)
- Home stadium: Oliver C. Dawson Stadium

1993 Mid-Eastern Athletic Conference football standings
	Conf.					Overall
Team	W		L		T	W		L		T
No. 8 Howard $^	6	–	0	–	0	11	–	1	–	0
South Carolina State	4	–	2	–	0	8	–	3	–	0
Delaware State	4	–	2	–	0	6	–	5	–	0
No. 21 North Carolina A&T	3	–	3	–	0	8	–	3	–	0
Florida A&M	3	–	3	–	0	5	–	6	–	0
Morgan State	1	–	5	–	0	3	–	8	–	0
Bethune–Cookman	0	–	6	–	0	1	–	10	–	0
$ – Conference champion; ^ – NCAA Division I-AA playoff participant; Rankings from The Sports Network poll

The 1993 South Carolina State Bulldogs football team represented South Carolina State University as a member of the Mid-Eastern Athletic Conference (MEAC) during the 1993 NCAA Division I-AA football season. Led by 11th-year head coach Willie Jeffries, the Bulldogs compiled an overall record of 8–4, with a mark of 4–2 in conference play, and finished tied for second in the MEAC.

== Schedule ==
Date	Opponent	Site	Result	Attendance	Source
September 4	at Newberry*	Setzler Field; Newberry, SC	W 38–0	5,964	
September 11	vs. Florida A&M	Williams–Brice Stadium; Columbia, SC (Palmetto Classic)	L 17–21	24,300	
September 18	Charleston Southern*	Oliver C. Dawson Stadium; Orangeburg, SC	W 44–10	4,217	
September 25	vs. No. 25 Southern*	Georgia Dome; Atlanta, GA (Atlanta Football Classic)	L 10–14	58,199	
October 2	vs. Jackson State*	Hoosier Dome; Indianapolis, IN (Circle City Classic)	W 34–33	61,915	
October 9	at Morgan State	Hughes Stadium; Baltimore, MD	W 49–13	3,400	
October 16	at Bethune–Cookman	Municipal Stadium; Daytona Beach, FL	W 40–27		
October 23	North Carolina Central*^{†}	Oliver C. Dawson Stadium; Orangeburg, SC	W 42–13	15,727	
October 30	Delaware State	Oliver C. Dawson Stadium; Orangeburg, SC	W 38–15	6,727	
November 7	at No. 10 Howard	William H. Greene Stadium; Washington, DC	L 14–30		
November 20	No. 16 North Carolina A&T	Oliver C. Dawson Stadium; Orangeburg, SC (rivalry)	W 58–52 ^{3OT}	13,335	
January 1, 1994	vs. No. 15 Southern*	Georgia Dome; Atlanta, GA (Heritage Bowl)	L 0–11	36,128	
*Non-conference game; ^{†}Homecoming; Rankings from The Sports Network Poll released prior to the game
