= 1993 Morgan State Bears football team =

American college football season

1993 Morgan State Bears football
- Conference: Mid-Eastern Athletic Conference
- Record: 3–8 (1–5 MEAC)
- Head coach: Ricky Diggs (3rd season)
- Home stadium: Hughes Stadium

1993 Mid-Eastern Athletic Conference football standings
	Conf.					Overall
Team	W		L		T	W		L		T
No. 8 Howard $^	6	–	0	–	0	11	–	1	–	0
South Carolina State	4	–	2	–	0	8	–	3	–	0
Delaware State	4	–	2	–	0	6	–	5	–	0
No. 21 North Carolina A&T	3	–	3	–	0	8	–	3	–	0
Florida A&M	3	–	3	–	0	5	–	6	–	0
Morgan State	1	–	5	–	0	3	–	8	–	0
Bethune–Cookman	0	–	6	–	0	1	–	10	–	0
$ – Conference champion; ^ – NCAA Division I-AA playoff participant; Rankings from The Sports Network poll

The 1993 Morgan State Bears football team represented Morgan State University as a member of the Mid-Eastern Athletic Conference (MEAC) during the 1993 NCAA Division I-AA football season. Led by third-year head coach Ricky Diggs, the Bears compiled an overall record of 3–8, with a mark of 1–5 in conference play, and finished sixth in the MEAC.

== Schedule ==
Date	Opponent	Site	Result	Attendance	Source
September 4	Charleston Southern*	Hughes Stadium; Baltimore, MD	W 54–20	4,517	
September 11	at Bethune–Cookman	Municipal Stadium; Daytona Beach, FL	W 17–41 (forfeit win)	6,794	
September 18	at No. 10 Youngstown State*	Stambaugh Stadium; Youngstown, OH	L 27–56	14,284	
September 25	at Virginia Union*	Hovey Field; Richmond, VA	W 38–21	1,023	
October 9	South Carolina State	Hughes Stadium; Baltimore, MD	L 13–49	3,400	
October 16	No. 5 North Carolina A&T	Hughes Stadium; Baltimore, MD	L 33–49	13,462	
October 23	at Delaware State	Alumni Stadium; Dover, DE	L 42–65		
October 30	vs. Florida A&M	Florida Citrus Bowl; Orlando, FL	L 14–41		
November 5	at Knoxville*	Dusty Lennon Stadium; Knoxville, TN	L 28–32		
November 13	No. 9 Howard	Hughes Stadium; Baltimore, MD (rivalry)	L 37–66	8,136	
November 20	Towson State*	Hughes Stadium; Baltimore, MD (rivalry)	L 12–56	2,014	
*Non-conference game; Rankings from The Sports Network Poll released prior to the game
