= 1993 Buffalo Bulls football team =

American college football season

1993 Buffalo Bulls football
- Conference: Independent
- Record: 1–10
- Head coach: Jim Ward (2nd season)
- Defensive coordinator: Gregory Richardson (2nd season)
- Captains: Mark Anderson; Doug Radwanski; Gary Feagin
- Home stadium: University at Buffalo Stadium

1993 NCAA Division I-AA independents football standings
	Conf.			Overall
Team	W	L	T	W		L		T
No. 1 Troy State ^		–		11	–	0	–	1
Youngstown State ^		–		10	–	2	–	0
UAB		–		9	–	2	–	0
Wagner		–		9	–	2	–	0
No. 12 UCF ^		–		9	–	3	–	0
No. 24 Towson State		–		8	–	2	–	0
No. 19 Western Kentucky		–		8	–	3	–	0
Hofstra		–		6	–	3	–	1
Saint Mary's		–		6	–	3	–	1
Davidson		–		6	–	4	–	0
Central Connecticut State		–		5	–	5	–	0
Liberty		–		5	–	5	–	0
Marist		–		5	–	5	–	0
Samford		–		5	–	6	–	0
Duquesne		–		4	–	6	–	0
Saint Francis (PA)		–		3	–	7	–	0
Charleston Southern		–		3	–	8	–	0
Monmouth		–		2	–	5	–	0
Buffalo		–		1	–	10	–	0
^ – NCAA Division I-AA playoff participant; Rankings from The Sports Network poll

The 1993 Buffalo Bulls football team represented the University at Buffalo as an independent during the 1993 NCAA Division I-AA football season. Led by second-year head coach Jim Ward, the Bulls compiled a record of 1–10. The team played home games at the newly opened University at Buffalo Stadium in Amherst, New York.

== Schedule ==
Date	Time	Opponent	Site	Result	Attendance	Source
September 4	7:00 pm	Maine	University at Buffalo Stadium; Amherst, NY	L 27–30	14,179	
September 11	7:00 pm	No. T–4 (D-II) New Haven	University at Buffalo Stadium; Amherst, NY	L 6–38	5,425	
September 18	7:00 pm	Lafayette	University at Buffalo Stadium; Amherst, NY	L 15–29	6,329	
September 25	7:00 pm	Edinboro	University at Buffalo Stadium; Amherst, NY	L 17–28	4,309	
October 2	7:30 pm	at Hofstra	Hofstra Stadium; Hempstead, NY	L 20–28	1,437	
October 9	1:00 pm	at Fordham	Coffey Field; Bronx, NY	W 33–14	3,080	
October 16	1:30 pm	Buffalo State	University at Buffalo Stadium; Amherst, NY	L 6–13	9,251	
October 23	1:30 pm	Towson State	University at Buffalo Stadium; Amherst, NY	L 14–38	2,434	
October 30	1:00 pm	at No. 1 Youngstown State	Stambaugh Stadium; Youngstown, OH	L 12–38	8,456	
November 6	1:00 pm	at No. 6 Boston University	Nickerson Field; Boston, MA	L 33–61	6,525	
November 13	1:00 pm	at No. 12 UCF	Florida Citrus Bowl; Orlando, FL	L 7–42	7,609	
Rankings from The Sports Network Poll released prior to the game; All times are in Eastern time
