= 1993 St. John's Redmen football team =

American college football season

1993 St. John's Redmen football
- Conference: Metro Atlantic Athletic Conference
- Record: 8–3 (3–2 MAAC)
- Head coach: Bob Ricca (16th season)
- Home stadium: Redmen Field

1993 Metro Atlantic Athletic Conference football standings
	Conf.					Overall
Team	W		L		T	W		L		T
Iona $	5	–	0	–	0	9	–	2	–	0
Canisius	4	–	1	–	0	5	–	5	–	0
St. John's	3	–	2	–	0	8	–	3	–	0
Georgetown	2	–	3	–	0	4	–	5	–	0
Saint Peter's	1	–	4	–	0	3	–	7	–	0
Siena	0	–	5	–	0	0	–	10	–	0
$ – Conference champion

The 1993 St. John's Redmen football team was an American football team that represented St. John's University as a member of the Metro Atlantic Athletic Conference (MAAC) during the 1993 NCAA Division I-AA football season. In their 16th year under head coach Bob Ricca, the team compiled an overall record of 8–3, with a mark of 3–2 in conference play, and finished third in the MAAC.

== Schedule ==
Date	Opponent	Site	Result	Attendance	Source
September 11	Saint Peter's	Redmen Field; Queens, NY	W 29–28		
September 18	at Wagner*	Fischer Memorial Stadium; Staten Island, NY	L 9–34	2,122	
September 25	at Siena	Heritage Park; Colonie, NY	W 28–6		
October 1	Marist*	Redmen Field; Queens, NY	W 31–30		
October 9	at Pace*	Finnerty Field; Pleasantville, NY	W 44–16		
October 16	Canisius	Redmen Field; Queens, NY	L 18–23		
October 23	Sacred Heart*	Redmen Field; Queens, NY	W 30–0	1,186	
October 30	at Duquesne*	Arthur J. Rooney Athletic Field; Pittsburgh, PA	W 37–12		
November 6	at Georgetown	Kehoe Field; Washington, DC	W 25–24		
November 12	Iona	Redmen Field; Queens, NY	L 30–42	3,025	
November 25	Stony Brook*	Redmen Field; Queens, NY	W 17–14	1,052	
*Non-conference game
