= 1993 Samford Bulldogs football team =

American college football season

1993 Samford Bulldogs football
- Conference: Independent
- Record: 5–6
- Head coach: Chan Gailey (1st season)
- Offensive coordinator: Joe D'Alessandris (1st season)
- Defensive coordinator: Pete Hurt (1st season)
- Home stadium: Seibert Stadium

1993 NCAA Division I-AA independents football standings
	Conf.			Overall
Team	W	L	T	W		L		T
No. 1 Troy State ^		–		11	–	0	–	1
Youngstown State ^		–		10	–	2	–	0
UAB		–		9	–	2	–	0
Wagner		–		9	–	2	–	0
No. 12 UCF ^		–		9	–	3	–	0
No. 24 Towson State		–		8	–	2	–	0
No. 19 Western Kentucky		–		8	–	3	–	0
Hofstra		–		6	–	3	–	1
Saint Mary's		–		6	–	3	–	1
Davidson		–		6	–	4	–	0
Central Connecticut State		–		5	–	5	–	0
Liberty		–		5	–	5	–	0
Marist		–		5	–	5	–	0
Samford		–		5	–	6	–	0
Duquesne		–		4	–	6	–	0
Saint Francis (PA)		–		3	–	7	–	0
Charleston Southern		–		3	–	8	–	0
Monmouth		–		2	–	5	–	0
Buffalo		–		1	–	10	–	0
^ – NCAA Division I-AA playoff participant; Rankings from The Sports Network poll

The 1993 Samford Bulldogs football team represented Samford University as an independent during the 1993 NCAA Division I-AA football season. Led by first-year head coach Chan Gailey, the Bulldogs compiled an overall record of 5–6.

== Schedule ==
Date	Opponent	Rank	Site	Result	Attendance	Source
September 4	Glenville State	No. 14	Seibert Stadium; Homewood, AL	W 20–14		
September 11	at Auburn	No. 12	Jordan-Hare Stadium; Auburn, AL	L 7–35	68,936	
September 18	Tennessee Tech	No. 15	Seibert Stadium; Homewood, AL	W 30–3		
September 25	Bethune–Cookman	No. 13	Seibert Stadium; Homewood, AL	W 27–10		
October 9	at No. 16 UCF	No. 9	Florida Citrus Bowl; Orlando, FL	L 17–48	8,081	
October 16	Mississippi College	No. 19	Seibert Stadium; Homewood, AL	L 14–21		
October 23	at No. 3 Youngstown State		Stambaugh Stadium; Youngstown, OH	L 7–24	15,194	
November 6	Tennessee–Martin		Seibert Stadium; Homewood, AL	W 10–0		
November 13	at Southwest Missouri State		Plaster Sports Complex; Springfield, MO	L 14–42		
November 20	No. 1 Troy State		Seibert Stadium; Homewood, AL	L 24–52		
Rankings from The Sports Network Poll released prior to the game
