= 1993 North Carolina A&T Aggies football team =

American college football season

1993 North Carolina A&T Aggies football
- Conference: Mid-Eastern Athletic Conference

Ranking
- Sports Network: No. 21
- Record: 8–3 (3–3 MEAC)
- Head coach: Bill Hayes (6th season)
- Home stadium: Aggie Stadium

1993 Mid-Eastern Athletic Conference football standings
	Conf.					Overall
Team	W		L		T	W		L		T
No. 8 Howard $^	6	–	0	–	0	11	–	1	–	0
South Carolina State	4	–	2	–	0	8	–	3	–	0
Delaware State	4	–	2	–	0	6	–	5	–	0
No. 21 North Carolina A&T	3	–	3	–	0	8	–	3	–	0
Florida A&M	3	–	3	–	0	5	–	6	–	0
Morgan State	1	–	5	–	0	3	–	8	–	0
Bethune–Cookman	0	–	6	–	0	1	–	10	–	0
$ – Conference champion; ^ – NCAA Division I-AA playoff participant; Rankings from The Sports Network poll

The 1993 North Carolina A&T Aggies football team represented North Carolina A&T State University as a member of the Mid-Eastern Athletic Conference (MEAC) during the 1993 NCAA Division I-AA football season. Led by sixth-year head coach Bill Hayes, the Aggies compiled an overall record of 8–3, with a mark of 3–3 in conference play, and finished tied for fourth in the MEAC.

== Schedule ==
Date	Opponent	Rank	Site	Result	Attendance	Source
September 4	No. 18 Appalachian State*	No. 25	Aggie Stadium; Greensboro, NC	W 22–10	10,700	
September 11	at Winston-Salem State*	No. 17	Bowman Gray Stadium; Winston-Salem, NC (rivalry)	W 49–21	23,200	
September 25	at No. 11 Western Carolina*	No. 12	E. J. Whitmire Stadium; Cullowhee, NC	W 34–7	11,288	
October 2	at Liberty*	No. 9	Liberty University Stadium; Lynchburg, VA	W 38–30	12,000	
October 9	No. 22 Florida A&M	No. 7	Aggie Stadium; Greensboro, NC	W 41–13	13,560	
October 16	at Morgan State	No. 5	Hughes Stadium; Baltimore, MD	W 49–33	13,462	
October 23	No. 19 Howard	No. 5	Aggie Stadium; Greensboro, NC	L 35–41 ^{OT}		
October 30	at Bethune–Cookman	No. 14	Municipal Stadium; Daytona Beach, FL	W 29–14	8,173	
November 6	Delaware State	No. 12	Aggie Stadium; Greensboro, NC	L 19–25	8,125	
November 13	Johnson C. Smith*	No. 18	Aggie Stadium; Greensboro, NC	W 52–7	14,333	
November 20	at South Carolina State	No. 16	Oliver C. Dawson Stadium; Orangeburg, SC (rivalry)	L 52–58 ^{3OT}	13,335	
*Non-conference game; Rankings from The Sports Network Poll released prior to the game
