= 1993 Western Kentucky Hilltoppers football team =

American college football season

1993 Western Kentucky Hilltoppers football
- Conference: Independent

Ranking
- Sports Network: No. 19
- Record: 8–3
- Head coach: Jack Harbaugh (5th season)
- Captains: Ben Mooney; Eddie Thompson
- Home stadium: L. T. Smith Stadium

1993 NCAA Division I-AA independents football standings
	Conf.			Overall
Team	W	L	T	W		L		T
No. 1 Troy State ^		–		11	–	0	–	1
Youngstown State ^		–		10	–	2	–	0
UAB		–		9	–	2	–	0
Wagner		–		9	–	2	–	0
No. 12 UCF ^		–		9	–	3	–	0
No. 24 Towson State		–		8	–	2	–	0
No. 19 Western Kentucky		–		8	–	3	–	0
Hofstra		–		6	–	3	–	1
Saint Mary's		–		6	–	3	–	1
Davidson		–		6	–	4	–	0
Central Connecticut State		–		5	–	5	–	0
Liberty		–		5	–	5	–	0
Marist		–		5	–	5	–	0
Samford		–		5	–	6	–	0
Duquesne		–		4	–	6	–	0
Saint Francis (PA)		–		3	–	7	–	0
Charleston Southern		–		3	–	8	–	0
Monmouth		–		2	–	5	–	0
Buffalo		–		1	–	10	–	0
^ – NCAA Division I-AA playoff participant; Rankings from The Sports Network poll

The 1993 Western Kentucky Hilltoppers football team represented Western Kentucky University as an independent during the 1993 NCAA Division I-AA football season. Led by fifth-year head Jack Harbaugh, the Hilltoppers compiled a record of 8–3. They missed the NCAA Division I-AA Football Championship playoffs but finished the season ranked No. 19 in final NCAA Division I-AA poll.

Western Kentucky primarily ran an option offense and led NCAA Division I-AA team in rushing. The team's captains were Ben Mooney and Eddie Thompson. The roster included future National Football League (NFL) player Robert Jackson.

== Schedule ==
Date	Time	Opponent	Rank	Site	Result	Attendance	Source
September 2		at No. 10 Eastern Kentucky		Roy Kidd Stadium; Richmond, KY (rivalry)	W 15–10	17,200	
September 11	1:10 p.m.	at Kansas State		KSU Stadium; Manhattan, KS	L 13–38	29,356	
September 18		at Austin Peay		Municipal Stadium; Clarksville, TN	W 28–27	6,089	
September 25		UAB		L. T. Smith Stadium; Bowling Green, KY	W 40–13	7,000	
October 2		Jacksonville State^{†}	No. 25	L. T. Smith Stadium; Bowling Green, KY	W 12–7	8,800	
October 16		at Southern Illinois	No. 21	McAndrew Stadium; Carbondale, IL	W 51–24	7,200	
October 23		at Indiana State	No. 18	Memorial Stadium; Terre Haute, IN	L 14–41	10,191	
October 30		Western Illinois		L. T. Smith Stadium; Bowling Green, KY	W 41–9	4,511	
November 6		at No. 4 Troy State	No. 24	Veterans Memorial Stadium; Troy, AL	L 24–31	5,100	
November 13		Eastern Illinois	No. 25	L. T. Smith Stadium; Bowling Green, KY	W 24–21	3,527	
November 20		Murray State	No. 20	L. T. Smith Stadium; Bowling Green, KY (rivalry)	W 44–14	4,552	
^{†}Homecoming; Rankings from The Sports Network Poll released prior to the game; All times are in Central time
