= 1993 Iona Gaels football team =

American college football season

1993 Iona Gaels football

MAAC champion

ECAC–Division I-AA Bowl, L 0–32 vs. Wagner
- Conference: Metro Atlantic Athletic Conference
- Record: 9–2 (5–0 MAAC)
- Head coach: Harold Crocker (9th season)
- Home stadium: Mazzella Field

1993 Metro Atlantic Athletic Conference football standings
	Conf.					Overall
Team	W		L		T	W		L		T
Iona $	5	–	0	–	0	9	–	2	–	0
Canisius	4	–	1	–	0	5	–	5	–	0
St. John's	3	–	2	–	0	8	–	3	–	0
Georgetown	2	–	3	–	0	4	–	5	–	0
Saint Peter's	1	–	4	–	0	3	–	7	–	0
Siena	0	–	5	–	0	0	–	10	–	0
$ – Conference champion

The 1993 Iona Gaels football team was an American football team that represented Iona College (now known as Iona University) as a member of the Metro Atlantic Athletic Conference (MAAC) during the 1993 NCAA Division I-AA football season. In their ninth year under head coach Harold Crocker, the team compiled an overall record of 9–2, with a mark of 5–0 in conference play, and finished as MAAC champion.

== Schedule ==
Date	Opponent	Site	Result	Attendance	Source
September 11	at Sacred Heart*	Campus Field; Fairfield, CT	W 24–0	1,900	
September 18	Central Connecticut State*	Mazzella Field; New Rochelle, NY	L 13–24		
September 25	Georgetown	Mazzella Field; New Rochelle, NY	W 22–15	1,200	
October 2	at Wagner*	Fischer Memorial Stadium; Staten Island, NY	W 30–23	2,648	
October 9	at Canisius	Demske Sports Complex; Buffalo, NY	W 19–9	235	
October 16	at Saint Peter's	JFK Stadium; Hoboken, NJ	W 35–28		
October 23	Pace*	Mazzella Field; New Rochelle, NY	W 38–6		
October 30	at Siena	Heritage Park; Colonie, NY	W 54–21	729	
November 6	Marist*	Mazzella Field; New Rochelle, NY	W 27–24	1,200	
November 12	at St. John's	Redmen Field; Queens, NY	W 42–30	3,025	
November 20	Wagner*	Mazzella Field; New Rochelle, NY (ECAC–IFC Division I-AA Bowl)	L 0–32	1,200	
*Non-conference game
