= 1993 Youngstown State Penguins football team =

American college football season

1993 Youngstown State Penguins football

NCAA Division I-AA champion

NCAA Division I-AA Championship Game, W 17–5 vs. Marshall
- Conference: Independent

Ranking
- Sports Network: No. 7
- Record: 13–2
- Head coach: Jim Tressel (8th season)
- Home stadium: Stambaugh Stadium

1993 NCAA Division I-AA independents football standings
| | Conf. | | | Overall |
| Team | W | L | T | W | | L | | T |
|---|---|---|---|---|---|---|---|---|
| No. 1 Troy State ^ | | – | | 11 | – | 0 | – | 1 |
| Youngstown State ^ | | – | | 10 | – | 2 | – | 0 |
| UAB | | – | | 9 | – | 2 | – | 0 |
| Wagner | | – | | 9 | – | 2 | – | 0 |
| No. 12 UCF ^ | | – | | 9 | – | 3 | – | 0 |
| No. 24 Towson State | | – | | 8 | – | 2 | – | 0 |
| No. 19 Western Kentucky | | – | | 8 | – | 3 | – | 0 |
| Hofstra | | – | | 6 | – | 3 | – | 1 |
| Saint Mary's | | – | | 6 | – | 3 | – | 1 |
| Davidson | | – | | 6 | – | 4 | – | 0 |
| Central Connecticut State | | – | | 5 | – | 5 | – | 0 |
| Liberty | | – | | 5 | – | 5 | – | 0 |
| Marist | | – | | 5 | – | 5 | – | 0 |
| Samford | | – | | 5 | – | 6 | – | 0 |
| Duquesne | | – | | 4 | – | 6 | – | 0 |
| Saint Francis (PA) | | – | | 3 | – | 7 | – | 0 |
| Charleston Southern | | – | | 3 | – | 8 | – | 0 |
| Monmouth | | – | | 2 | – | 5 | – | 0 |
| Buffalo | | – | | 1 | – | 10 | – | 0 |
^ – NCAA Division I-AA playoff participant; Rankings from The Sports Network poll

The 1993 Youngstown State Penguins football team was an American football team represented Youngstown State University in the 1993 NCAA Division I-AA football season. In their eighth season under head coach Jim Tressel, the team compiled a 13–2 record and defeated Marshall in the 1993 NCAA Division I-AA Football Championship Game. It was Youngstown State's second national championship in three years.

Tailback Tamron Smith received the team's most valuable player award. The team's statistical leaders included Smith with 1,433 rushing yards and 120 points scored, Darnell Clark with 1,822 all-purpose yards, Mark Brungard with 1,504 passing yards, and Leon Jones with 177 tackles (including 103 solo tackles).

== Schedule ==
| Date | Opponent | Rank | Site | Result | Attendance | Source |
|---|---|---|---|---|---|---|
| September 2 | at Western Michigan | No. 3 | Waldo Stadium; Kalamazoo, MI | W 17–3 | 29,084 | |
| September 11 | at Stephen F. Austin | No. 2 | Homer Bryce Stadium; Nacogdoches, TX | L 15–35 | | |
| September 18 | Morgan State | No. 10 | Stambaugh Stadium; Youngstown, OH | W 56–27 | 14,284 | |
| October 2 | at Eastern Kentucky | No. 8 | Roy Kidd Stadium; Richmond, KY | W 26–22 | | |
| October 9 | Delaware State^{†} | No. 6 | Stambaugh Stadium; Youngstown, OH | W 42–28 | | |
| October 16 | Liberty | No. 4 | Stambaugh Stadium; Youngstown, OH | W 42–0 | | |
| October 23 | Samford | No. 3 | Stambaugh Stadium; Youngstown, OH | W 24–7 | 15,194 | |
| October 30 | Buffalo | No. 1 | Stambaugh Stadium; Youngstown, OH | W 38–12 | 8,456 | |
| November 6 | Indiana State | No. 1 | Stambaugh Stadium; Youngstown, OH | W 17–10 | | |
| November 13 | at Illinois State | No. 1 | Hancock Stadium; Normal, IL | L 10–13 | 5,195 | |
| November 20 | at Akron | No. 7 | Rubber Bowl; Akron, OH (Steel Tire) | W 19–0 | 8,000 | |
| November 27 | No. 12 UCF | No. 7 | Stambaugh Stadium; Youngstown, OH (NCAA Division I-AA First Round) | W 56–30 | 7,408 | |
| December 4 | No. 2 Georgia Southern | No. 7 | Stambaugh Stadium; Youngstown, OH (NCAA Division I–AA Quarterfinal) | W 34–14 | 9,503 | |
| December 11 | No. 11 Idaho | No. 7 | Stambaugh Stadium; Youngstown, OH (NCAA Division I–AA Semifinal) | W 35–16 | 9,644 | |
| December 18 | vs. No. 9 Marshall | No. 7 | Marshall University Stadium; Huntington, WV (NCAA Division I-AA Football Championship Game) | W 17–5 | 29,218 | |
^{†}Homecoming; Rankings from The Sports Network Poll released prior to the game
