= 1993 Georgetown Hoyas football team =

American college football season

1993 Georgetown Hoyas football
- Conference: Metro Atlantic Athletic Conference
- Record: 4–5 (2–3 MAAC)
- Head coach: Bob Benson (1st season)
- Home stadium: Kehoe Field

1993 Metro Atlantic Athletic Conference football standings
| | Conf. | | | | | Overall |
| Team | W | | L | | T | W | | L | | T |
|---|---|---|---|---|---|---|---|---|---|---|
| Iona $ | 5 | – | 0 | – | 0 | 9 | – | 2 | – | 0 |
| Canisius | 4 | – | 1 | – | 0 | 5 | – | 5 | – | 0 |
| St. John's | 3 | – | 2 | – | 0 | 8 | – | 3 | – | 0 |
| Georgetown | 2 | – | 3 | – | 0 | 4 | – | 5 | – | 0 |
| Saint Peter's | 1 | – | 4 | – | 0 | 3 | – | 7 | – | 0 |
| Siena | 0 | – | 5 | – | 0 | 0 | – | 10 | – | 0 |
$ – Conference champion

The 1993 Georgetown Hoyas football team was an American football team that represented Georgetown University as a member of the Metro Atlantic Athletic Conference (MAAC) during the 1993 NCAA Division I-AA football season. In their first year under head coach Bob Benson, the team compiled an overall record of 4–5, with a mark of 2–3 in conference play, and finished fourth in the MAAC.

== Schedule ==
| Date | Opponent | Site | Result | Attendance | Source |
|---|---|---|---|---|---|
| September 25 | at Iona | Mazzella Field; New Rochelle, NY | L 15–22 | 1,200 | |
| October 2 | at Siena | Heritage Park; Colonie, NY | W 35–6 | | |
| October 9 | at Saint Peter's | JFK Stadium; Hoboken, NJ | W 26–14 | | |
| October 16 | Franklin & Marshall* | Kehoe Field; Washington, DC | L 3–17 | 1,757 | |
| October 22 | at Johns Hopkins* | Homewood Field; Baltimore, MD | L 17–19 | 1,142 | |
| October 30 | Catholic University* | Kehoe Field; Washington, DC | W 10–0 | | |
| November 6 | St. John's | Kehoe Field; Washington, DC | L 24–25 | | |
| November 13 | at Canisius | Demske Sports Complex; Buffalo, NY | L 14–19 | | |
| November 20 | vs. Washington and Lee* | Bermuda National Stadium; Hamilton, Bermuda (Bermuda Bowl) | W 17–14 | | |
*Non-conference game
