= 1993 Liberty Flames football team =

American college football season

1993 Liberty Flames football
- Conference: Independent
- Record: 6–5
- Head coach: Sam Rutigliano (5th season)
- Home stadium: Liberty University Stadium

1993 NCAA Division I-AA independents football standings
	Conf.			Overall
Team	W	L	T	W		L		T
No. 1 Troy State ^		–		11	–	0	–	1
Youngstown State ^		–		10	–	2	–	0
UAB		–		9	–	2	–	0
Wagner		–		9	–	2	–	0
No. 12 UCF ^		–		9	–	3	–	0
No. 24 Towson State		–		8	–	2	–	0
No. 19 Western Kentucky		–		8	–	3	–	0
Hofstra		–		6	–	3	–	1
Saint Mary's		–		6	–	3	–	1
Davidson		–		6	–	4	–	0
Central Connecticut State		–		5	–	5	–	0
Liberty		–		5	–	5	–	0
Marist		–		5	–	5	–	0
Samford		–		5	–	6	–	0
Duquesne		–		4	–	6	–	0
Saint Francis (PA)		–		3	–	7	–	0
Charleston Southern		–		3	–	8	–	0
Monmouth		–		2	–	5	–	0
Buffalo		–		1	–	10	–	0
^ – NCAA Division I-AA playoff participant; Rankings from The Sports Network poll

The 1993 Liberty Flames football team represented Liberty University as an independent during the 1993 NCAA Division I-AA football season. Led by fifth-year head coach Sam Rutigliano, the Flames compiled an overall record of 6–5.

== Schedule ==
Date	Opponent	Rank	Site	Result	Attendance	Source
September 4	Concord		Liberty University Stadium; Lynchburg, VA	W 37–3	9,200	
September 11	at Appalachian State	No. 25	Kidd Brewer Stadium; Boone, NC	W 20–14	12,867	
September 18	at Southwest Texas State	No. 18	Bobcat Stadium; San Marcos, TX	W 17–14		
September 25	No. 7 (D-II) IUP	No. 15	Liberty University Stadium; Lynchburg, VA	L 7–23	5,300	
October 2	No. 9 North Carolina A&T		Liberty University Stadium; Lynchburg, VA	L 30–38	12,000	
October 9	at No. 3 Troy State		Veterans Memorial Stadium; Troy, AL	L 13–35		
October 16	at No. 4 Youngstown State		Stambaugh Stadium; Youngstown, OH	L 0–42		
October 30	Charleston Southern		Liberty University Stadium; Lynchburg, VA	W 42–6	7,000	
November 6	at No. 13 UCF		Florida Citrus Bowl; Orlando, FL	L 19–55	8,688	
November 13	at Delaware State		Alumni Stadium; Dover, DE	W 47–43		
November 20	Villanova		Liberty University Stadium; Lynchburg, VA	W 27–13	4,300	
Rankings from NCAA Division I-AA Football Committee Poll released prior to the game
