= 1993 Towson State Tigers football team =

American college football season

1993 Towson State Tigers football
- Conference: Independent

Ranking
- Sports Network: No. 24
- Record: 8–2
- Head coach: Gordy Combs (2nd season)
- Home stadium: Minnegan Stadium

1993 NCAA Division I-AA independents football standings
	Conf.			Overall
Team	W	L	T	W		L		T
No. 1 Troy State ^		–		11	–	0	–	1
Youngstown State ^		–		10	–	2	–	0
UAB		–		9	–	2	–	0
Wagner		–		9	–	2	–	0
No. 12 UCF ^		–		9	–	3	–	0
No. 24 Towson State		–		8	–	2	–	0
No. 19 Western Kentucky		–		8	–	3	–	0
Hofstra		–		6	–	3	–	1
Saint Mary's		–		6	–	3	–	1
Davidson		–		6	–	4	–	0
Central Connecticut State		–		5	–	5	–	0
Liberty		–		5	–	5	–	0
Marist		–		5	–	5	–	0
Samford		–		5	–	6	–	0
Duquesne		–		4	–	6	–	0
Saint Francis (PA)		–		3	–	7	–	0
Charleston Southern		–		3	–	8	–	0
Monmouth		–		2	–	5	–	0
Buffalo		–		1	–	10	–	0
^ – NCAA Division I-AA playoff participant; Rankings from The Sports Network poll

The 1993 Towson State Tigers football team was an American football team that represented Towson State University (now known as Towson University) as an independent during the 1993 NCAA Division I-AA football season. Led by second-year head coach Gordy Combs, the team compiled a 8–2 record.

== Schedule ==
Date	Opponent	Site	Result	Attendance	Source
September 11	Central Connecticut State	Minnegan Stadium; Towson, MD	W 42–7	1,384	
September 18	Delaware State	Minnegan Stadium; Towson, MD	W 31–14	1,320	
September 25	Charleston Southern	Minnegan Stadium; Towson, MD	W 52–14		
October 2	at Connecticut	Memorial Stadium; Storrs, CT	W 28–27	11,247	
October 16	No. 22 Howard	Minnegan Stadium; Towson, MD	L 41–44	6,076	
October 23	at Buffalo	University at Buffalo Stadium; Amherst, NY	W 38–14	2,434	
October 30	at Hofstra	Hofstra Stadium; Hempstead, NY	L 12–40	897	
November 6	at No. 14 Delaware	Delaware Stadium; Newark, DE	W 32–30	20,709	
November 13	Bucknell	Minnegan Stadium; Towson, MD	W 49–21	2,109	
November 20	at Morgan State	Hughes Stadium; Baltimore, MD (rivalry)	W 56–12	2,014	
Rankings from The Sports Network Poll released prior to the game
