= 1993 Saint Peter's Peacocks football team =

American college football season

1993 Saint Peter's Peacocks football
- Conference: Metro Atlantic Athletic Conference
- Record: 3–7 (1–4 MAAC)
- Head coach: Roy Miller (3rd season)
- Home stadium: JFK Stadium

1993 Metro Atlantic Athletic Conference football standings
	Conf.					Overall
Team	W		L		T	W		L		T
Iona $	5	–	0	–	0	9	–	2	–	0
Canisius	4	–	1	–	0	5	–	5	–	0
St. John's	3	–	2	–	0	8	–	3	–	0
Georgetown	2	–	3	–	0	4	–	5	–	0
Saint Peter's	1	–	4	–	0	3	–	7	–	0
Siena	0	–	5	–	0	0	–	10	–	0
$ – Conference champion

The 1993 Saint Peter's Peacocks football team was an American football team that represented Saint Peter's College (now known as Saint Peter's University) as a member of the Metro Atlantic Athletic Conference (MAAC) during the 1993 NCAA Division I-AA football season. In their third year under head coach Roy Miller, the team compiled an overall record of 3–7, with a mark of 1–4 in conference play, and finished fifth in the MAAC.

== Schedule ==
Date	Opponent	Site	Result	Attendance	Source
September 11	at St. John's	Redmen Field; Queens, NY	L 28–29		
September 18	at Siena	Heritage Park; Colonie, NY	W 31–0		
September 25	Saint Francis (PA)*	JFK Stadium; Hoboken, NJ	W 17–14		
October 2	at Monmouth*	Kessler Field; West Long Branch, NJ	L 42–44		
October 9	Georgetown	JFK Stadium; Hoboken, NJ	L 14–26		
October 16	Iona	JFK Stadium; Hoboken, NJ	L 28–35		
October 23	Canisius	JFK Stadium; Hoboken, NJ	L 20–29		
October 30	at Assumption*	Rocheleau Field; Worcester, MA	L 13–18		
November 6	at Central Connecticut State*	Arute Field; New Britain, CT	L 7–9		
November 13	Jersey City State*	JFK Stadium; Hoboken, NJ	W 44–24	2,116	
*Non-conference game
