= 1993 Canisius Golden Griffins football team =

American college football season

1993 Canisius Golden Griffins football
- Conference: Metro Atlantic Athletic Conference
- Record: 5–5 (4–1 MAAC)
- Head coach: Barry Mynter (2nd season)
- Home stadium: Demske Sports Complex

1993 Metro Atlantic Athletic Conference football standings
	Conf.					Overall
Team	W		L		T	W		L		T
Iona $	5	–	0	–	0	9	–	2	–	0
Canisius	4	–	1	–	0	5	–	5	–	0
St. John's	3	–	2	–	0	8	–	3	–	0
Georgetown	2	–	3	–	0	4	–	5	–	0
Saint Peter's	1	–	4	–	0	3	–	7	–	0
Siena	0	–	5	–	0	0	–	10	–	0
$ – Conference champion

The 1993 Canisius Golden Griffins football team represented Canisius College as a member of the Metro Atlantic Athletic Conference (MAAC) during the 1993 NCAA Division I-AA football season. Led by second-year head coach Barry Mynter, the Golden Griffins compiled an overall record of 5–5 with a mark of 4–1 in conference play, placing second in the MAAC. The Canisius offense scored 186 points while the defense allowed 165 points.

== Schedule ==
Date	Opponent	Site	Result	Attendance	Source
September 11	at Duquesne*	Arthur J. Rooney Athletic Field; Pittsburgh, PA	L 12–16	7,422	
September 18	at Buffalo State*	Coyer Field; Buffalo, NY	L 10–20	2,318	
September 25	Gannon*	Demske Sports Complex; Buffalo, NY	L 13–16	1,167	
October 1	Mercyhurst*	Demske Sports Complex; Buffalo, NY	L 9–13		
October 9	Iona	Demske Sports Complex; Buffalo, NY	L 9–19	235	
October 16	at St. John's	Redmen Field; Jamaica, NY	W 23–18		
October 23	at Saint Peter's	JFK Stadium; Hoboken, NJ	W 29–20		
October 30	Saint Francis (PA)*	Demske Sports Complex; Buffalo, NY	W 28–10		
November 6	at Siena	Heritage Park; Colonie, NY	W 34–19		
November 13	Georgetown	Demske Sports Complex; Buffalo, NY	W 19–14		
*Non-conference game
