= 1993 Siena Saints football team =

American college football season

1993 Siena Saints football
- Conference: Metro Atlantic Athletic Conference
- Record: 0–10 (0–5 MAAC)
- Head coach: Jack DuBois (12th season)
- Home stadium: Heritage Park

1993 Metro Atlantic Athletic Conference football standings
	Conf.					Overall
Team	W		L		T	W		L		T
Iona $	5	–	0	–	0	9	–	2	–	0
Canisius	4	–	1	–	0	5	–	5	–	0
St. John's	3	–	2	–	0	8	–	3	–	0
Georgetown	2	–	3	–	0	4	–	5	–	0
Saint Peter's	1	–	4	–	0	3	–	7	–	0
Siena	0	–	5	–	0	0	–	10	–	0
$ – Conference champion

The 1993 Siena Saints football team was an American football team that represented Siena College as a member of the Metro Atlantic Athletic Conference (MAAC) during the 1993 NCAA Division I-AA football season. In their 12th year under head coach Jack DuBois, the team compiled an overall record of 0–10, with a mark of 0–5 in conference play, and finished sixth in the MAAC.

== Schedule ==
Date	Opponent	Site	Result	Attendance	Source
September 11	at Assumption*	Rocheleau Field; Worcester, MA	L 6–24		
September 18	Saint Peter's	Heritage Park; Colonie, NY	L 0–31		
September 25	St. John's	Heritage Park; Colonie, NY	L 6–28		
October 2	Georgetown	Heritage Park; Colonie, NY	L 6–35		
October 9	at RPI*	'86 Field; Troy, NY	L 6–56		
October 16	at Bentley*	Waltham, MA	L 14–47		
October 23	at Stonehill*	Easton, MA	L 13–28		
October 30	Iona	Heritage Park; Colonie, NY	L 21–54	729	
November 6	Canisius	Heritage Park; Colonie, NY	L 19–34		
November 13	Marist*	Heritage Park; Colonie, NY	L 0–28		
*Non-conference game
