= 1993 Florida A&M Rattlers football team =

American college football season

1993 Florida A&M Rattlers football
- Conference: Mid-Eastern Athletic Conference
- Record: 5–6 (3–3 MEAC)
- Head coach: Ken Riley (8th season)
- Defensive coordinator: George Small (1st season)
- Home stadium: Bragg Memorial Stadium

1993 Mid-Eastern Athletic Conference football standings
	Conf.					Overall
Team	W		L		T	W		L		T
No. 8 Howard $^	6	–	0	–	0	11	–	1	–	0
South Carolina State	4	–	2	–	0	8	–	3	–	0
Delaware State	4	–	2	–	0	6	–	5	–	0
No. 21 North Carolina A&T	3	–	3	–	0	8	–	3	–	0
Florida A&M	3	–	3	–	0	5	–	6	–	0
Morgan State	1	–	5	–	0	3	–	8	–	0
Bethune–Cookman	0	–	6	–	0	1	–	10	–	0
$ – Conference champion; ^ – NCAA Division I-AA playoff participant; Rankings from The Sports Network poll

The 1993 Florida A&M Rattlers football team represented Florida A&M University as a member of the Mid-Eastern Athletic Conference (MEAC) during the 1993 NCAA Division I-AA football season. Led by eighth-year head coach Ken Riley, the Rattlers compiled an overall record of 5–6, with a mark of 3–3 in conference play, and finished tied for fourth in the MEAC.

== Schedule ==
Date	Opponent	Rank	Site	Result	Attendance	Source
September 4	vs. Tennessee State*		Gator Bowl Stadium; Jacksonville, FL (Gateway Classic)	W 23–15		
September 11	vs. South Carolina State		Williams–Brice Stadium; Columbia, SC (Palmetto Classic)	W 21–17	24,300	
September 18	No. 16 Jackson State*	No. 23	Bragg Memorial Stadium; Tallahassee, FL	W 41–19	19,176	
October 2	at Howard	No. 14	William H. Greene Stadium; Washington, DC	L 13–32	12,167	
October 9	at No. 7 North Carolina A&T	No. 22	Aggie Stadium; Greensboro, NC	L 13–41	13,560	
October 16	Delaware State		Bragg Memorial Stadium; Tallahassee, FL	L 14–18	11,767	
October 23	Albany State*		Bragg Memorial Stadium; Tallahassee, FL	L 6–14	9,738	
October 30	vs. Morgan State		Florida Citrus Bowl; Orlando, FL	W 41–14		
November 6	No. 17 Southern*^{†}		Bragg Memorial Stadium; Tallahassee, FL	L 4–26	30,797	
November 13	at Grambling State*		Eddie G. Robinson Memorial Stadium; Grambling, LA	L 13–39		
November 27	vs. Bethune–Cookman		Tampa Stadium; Tampa, FL (Florida Classic)	W 35–21	31,624	
*Non-conference game; ^{†}Homecoming; Rankings from The Sports Network Poll released prior to the game
