= 1993 UAB Blazers football team =

American college football season

1993 UAB Blazers football
- Conference: Independent
- Record: 9–2
- Head coach: Jim Hilyer (3rd season)
- Offensive scheme: Multiple
- Base defense: 3–4
- Home stadium: Legion Field

1993 NCAA Division I-AA independents football standings
	Conf.			Overall
Team	W	L	T	W		L		T
No. 1 Troy State ^		–		11	–	0	–	1
Youngstown State ^		–		10	–	2	–	0
UAB		–		9	–	2	–	0
Wagner		–		9	–	2	–	0
No. 12 UCF ^		–		9	–	3	–	0
No. 24 Towson State		–		8	–	2	–	0
No. 19 Western Kentucky		–		8	–	3	–	0
Hofstra		–		6	–	3	–	1
Saint Mary's		–		6	–	3	–	1
Davidson		–		6	–	4	–	0
Central Connecticut State		–		5	–	5	–	0
Liberty		–		5	–	5	–	0
Marist		–		5	–	5	–	0
Samford		–		5	–	6	–	0
Duquesne		–		4	–	6	–	0
Saint Francis (PA)		–		3	–	7	–	0
Charleston Southern		–		3	–	8	–	0
Monmouth		–		2	–	5	–	0
Buffalo		–		1	–	10	–	0
^ – NCAA Division I-AA playoff participant; Rankings from The Sports Network poll

The 1993 UAB Blazers football team represented the University of Alabama at Birmingham (UAB) in the college football season of 1993, and was the third team fielded by the school. The team's head coach was Jim Hilyer, who was entered his third season as the UAB's head coach. They played their home games at Legion Field in Birmingham, Alabama and competed as a Division I-AA Independent. The Blazers finished their first season at the I-AA level with a record of nine wins and two losses (9–2).

== Schedule ==
Date	Opponent	Site	Result	Attendance	Source
September 6	No. 12 Troy State	Legion Field; Birmingham, AL	L 3–37	14,207	
September 11	Morehead State	Legion Field; Birmingham, AL	W 52–14	6,051	
September 25	at Western Kentucky	L. T. Smith Stadium; Bowling Green, KY	L 13–40	7,000	
October 2	at Miles	Legion Field; Birmingham, AL	W 31–6	4,000	
October 9	Lambuth	Legion Field; Birmingham, AL	W 40–14	5,856	
October 16	at Mississippi Valley State	Magnolia Stadium; Itta Bena, MS	W 33–13	9,500	
October 23	at Charleston Southern	Buccaneer Field; North Charleston, SC	W 48–20	1,550	
October 30	at Wofford	Snyder Field; Spartanburg, SC	W 23–11	1,304	
November 6	at Butler	Butler Bowl; Indianapolis, IN	W 31–27	1,047	
November 13	Dayton	Legion Field; Birmingham, AL	W 27–19	7,428	
November 20	Prairie View A&M	Legion Field; Birmingham, AL	W 58–12	4,181	
Rankings from Coaches' Poll released prior to the game

== Game summaries ==
=== Troy State ===
	1	2	3	4	Total
Troy State	3	7	14	13	37
UAB	3	0	0	0	3

In the Blazers first game as a Division I-AA independent, UAB took an early 3–0 lead on a 24-yard Kevin Thomason, only to fall by a final score of 37–3 to the in-state Trojans.

=== Morehead State ===
	1	2	3	4	Total
Morehead State	0	0	14	0	14
UAB	14	17	14	7	52

The Blazers notched their first win as a Division I-AA independent, with a 52–14 victory over Morehead State at Legion Field. Pat Green scored both of UAB's first-quarter touchdowns on separate 1-yard runs and took a 14–0 lead. The second quarter saw the Blazers tack on an additional 17 points on a David Thornton touchdown run, a 14-yard John Whitcomb touchdown pass to Jermaine Johnson and a 20-yard Kevin Thomason field goal to take a 31–0 halftime lead.

After Morehead ended the shutout with a pair of third-quarter touchdowns, the Blazers answered with a pair of touchdowns to close the third. The scores came on a 35-yard David Thornton run and on a 67-yard Whitcomb touchdown pass to Derrick Ingram. UAB added a 9-yard Chip Harris touchdown reception from Chris Williams to provide the final 52–14 margin of victory. In the victory, the Blazers had 482 yards of total offense.

=== Western Kentucky ===
	1	2	3	4	Total
UAB	7	6	0	0	13
Western Kentucky	7	13	14	7	41

In their first game on the road as a Division I-AA Independent, UAB traveled to Bowling Green and see their second defeat in three game with this 41–13 loss to the Hilltoppers. The Blazers scored first on a one-yard Pat Green touchdown run. After Western answered with a touchdown, UAB took the lead for a final time on a second one-yard Green run. After this score, the Blazers were unable to reach the end zone again in this 41–13 defeat.

=== Miles ===
The Blazers played a "road" game in their home stadium, playing cross-town opponent Miles College, and were victorious in this 31–6 victory. With the running game only able to gain 20 yards rushing, John Whitcomb completed 25 passes for 196 yards and a pair of touchdowns. For the game, the Golden Bears were flagged 21 times for 179 yards in the defeat.

=== Lambuth ===
Before a home crowd, UAB defeated the NAIA Division II Lambuth by a final score of 40–14. The Blazers were successful on offense and gained 446 total yards and on defense only allowed 202 yards and made five turnovers in the victory.

=== Mississippi Valley State ===
On the road, the Blazers upset the Delta Devils 33–19 and improved their overall record to 4–2. UAB scored on the first play from scrimmage after Wayne White recovered a MVSU fumble in the endzone for a touchdown. Additional touchdowns came on a one-yard David Thornton run and a three-yard Derrick Ingram reception from John Whitcomb in the victory.

=== Charleston Southern ===
On the road, the Blazers dominated offensively against the Buccaneers, also in their first year at Division I-AA. UAB had 469 yards of total offense with both Derrick Ingram and Marcus McKinney topping the 100-yard receiving mark with 104 and 131 yards respectively.

=== Wofford ===
On the road, Pat Green carried 23 times for 114 yards and John Whitcomb completed 20 of 31 passes for 196 yards in this 23–11 victory.

=== Butler ===
In their fourth consecutive road game, the Blazers were victorious and defeated the Bulldogs 31–27 with John Whitcomb having completed 21 of 31 passes for 380 yards. After spotting Butler 14 points, the Blazers got on the board in the second on a 66-yard Whitcomb touchdown pass Derrick Ingram. Down 21–7 at the start of the second half, UAB responded with scores on four consecutive possessions to take the lead and hold it for the victory. The four scores came on a 17-yard pass from Whitcomb to Lamar Akles, a 42-yard field goal from Kevin Thomason, an 11-yard Ingram reception and 25-yard pass from Whitcomb to Cedrick Buchannon.

=== Dayton ===
Also playing in their first year at Division I-AA, Dayton entered Legion Field with a streak of regular-season game victories at 46, and an overall unbeaten streak of 56 consecutive victories. As time expired, the Flyers exited with their first loss since the 1989 season in this 27–19 Blazers victory. UAB scored first on an 11-yard touchdown pass from John Whitcomb to Derrick Ingram. The touchdown marked the first allowed by the Flyers defense in the first quarter since 1991, and the first overall touchdown allowed since 1991 over a span of 19 games.

=== Prairie View A&M ===
In the final game of the 1993 season, the Blazers took a 44–6 lead over the Panthers at the half and sent Prairie View to their 35th consecutive loss in this 58–12 blowout victory. John Whitcomb starred in passing for 447 yards on 28 of 38 attempts with six touchdowns. Derrick Ingram also starred with 12 catches for 178 yards and two touchdowns, in addition to becoming the first Blazer to surpass the 1,000-yard plateau in a season with 1,102 total receiving yards.

== Awards and honors ==
The Sports Network: Second Team All-America
- Derrick Ingram, Jr., WR

The Sports Network: Honorable-mention All-America
- Josh Evans, Jr., DT
- John Whitcomb, Jr., QB
