= 1993 Howard Bison football team =

American college football season

1993 Howard Bison football

Black college national champion MEAC champion

1993 NCAA Division I-AA first round, L 14–28 vs. Marshall
- Conference: Mid-Eastern Athletic Conference

Ranking
- Sports Network: No. 8
- Record: 11–1 (6–0 MEAC)
- Head coach: Steve Wilson (5th season)
- Home stadium: William H. Greene Stadium

1993 Mid-Eastern Athletic Conference football standings
| | Conf. | | | | | Overall |
| Team | W | | L | | T | W | | L | | T |
|---|---|---|---|---|---|---|---|---|---|---|
| No. 8 Howard $^ | 6 | – | 0 | – | 0 | 11 | – | 1 | – | 0 |
| South Carolina State | 4 | – | 2 | – | 0 | 8 | – | 3 | – | 0 |
| Delaware State | 4 | – | 2 | – | 0 | 6 | – | 5 | – | 0 |
| No. 21 North Carolina A&T | 3 | – | 3 | – | 0 | 8 | – | 3 | – | 0 |
| Florida A&M | 3 | – | 3 | – | 0 | 5 | – | 6 | – | 0 |
| Morgan State | 1 | – | 5 | – | 0 | 3 | – | 8 | – | 0 |
| Bethune–Cookman | 0 | – | 6 | – | 0 | 1 | – | 10 | – | 0 |
$ – Conference champion; ^ – NCAA Division I-AA playoff participant; Rankings from The Sports Network poll

The 1993 Howard Bison football team represented Howard University as a member of the Mid-Eastern Athletic Conference (MEAC) during the 1993 NCAA Division I-AA football season. Led by fifth-year head coach Steve Wilson, the Bison compiled an overall record of 11–1, with a conference record of 6–0, and finished as MEAC champion. At the conclusion of the season, the Bison were also recognized as black college national champion.

== Schedule ==
| Date | Opponent | Rank | Site | Result | Attendance | Source |
|---|---|---|---|---|---|---|
| September 4 | Virginia Union* | | William H. Greene Stadium; Washington, DC | W 34–7 | 12,189 | |
| September 18 | Winston-Salem State* | | William H. Greene Stadium; Washington, DC | W 31–10 | 4,104 | |
| September 25 | vs. Alcorn State* | | Busch Memorial Stadium; St. Louis, MO (Gateway Classic) | W 38–36 | 17,798 | |
| October 2 | No. 14 Florida A&M | | William H. Greene Stadium; Washington, DC | W 32–13 | 12,167 | |
| October 9 | at Bethune–Cookman | No. 25 | Daytona Stadium; Daytona Beach, FL | W 21–7 | 1,188 | |
| October 16 | at Towson State* | No. 22 | Minnegan Stadium; Towson, MD | W 44–41 | 6,076 | |
| October 23 | at No. 5 North Carolina A&T | No. 19 | Aggie Stadium; Greensboro, NC | W 41–35 ^{OT} | | |
| October 30 | Morehouse* | No. 11 | Robert F. Kennedy Memorial Stadium; Washington, DC | W 34–9 | 15,897 | |
| November 7 | South Carolina State | No. 10 | William H. Greene Stadium; Washington, DC | W 30–14 | | |
| November 13 | at Morgan State | No. 9 | Hughes Stadium; Baltimore, MD (rivalry) | W 66–37 | 8,136 | |
| November 20 | at Delaware State | No. 8 | Alumni Stadium; Dover, DE | W 53–33 | 7,268 | |
| November 27 | at No. 9 Marshall* | No. 8 | Marshall University Stadium; Huntington, WV (NCAA Division I-AA First Round) | L 14–28 | | |
*Non-conference game; Rankings from NCAA Division I-AA Football Committee Poll released prior to the game
