= 1993 Troy State Trojans football team =

American college football season

1993 Troy State Trojans football

NCAA Division I-AA Semifinal, L 21–24 at Marshall
- Conference: Independent

Ranking
- Sports Network: No. 1
- Record: 12–1–1
- Head coach: Larry Blakeney (3rd season)
- Offensive coordinator: Don Jacobs (3rd season)
- Defensive coordinator: Johnny Williams (6th season)
- Home stadium: Veterans Memorial Stadium

1993 NCAA Division I-AA independents football standings
	Conf.			Overall
Team	W	L	T	W		L		T
No. 1 Troy State ^		–		11	–	0	–	1
Youngstown State ^		–		10	–	2	–	0
UAB		–		9	–	2	–	0
Wagner		–		9	–	2	–	0
No. 12 UCF ^		–		9	–	3	–	0
No. 24 Towson State		–		8	–	2	–	0
No. 19 Western Kentucky		–		8	–	3	–	0
Hofstra		–		6	–	3	–	1
Saint Mary's		–		6	–	3	–	1
Davidson		–		6	–	4	–	0
Central Connecticut State		–		5	–	5	–	0
Liberty		–		5	–	5	–	0
Marist		–		5	–	5	–	0
Samford		–		5	–	6	–	0
Duquesne		–		4	–	6	–	0
Saint Francis (PA)		–		3	–	7	–	0
Charleston Southern		–		3	–	8	–	0
Monmouth		–		2	–	5	–	0
Buffalo		–		1	–	10	–	0
^ – NCAA Division I-AA playoff participant; Rankings from The Sports Network poll

The 1993 Troy State Trojans football team represented Troy State University—now known as Troy University—as an independent during the 1993 NCAA Division I-AA football season. Led by third-year head coach Larry Blakeney, the Trojans compiled a record of 12–1–1. Troy State finished the regular season with a 10–0–1 record and a No. 1 ranking in the final Sports Network poll. The Trojans advanced to the NCAA Division I-AA Football Championship playoffs, beating Stephen F. Austin in the first round and McNeese State in the quarterfinals, before losing to Marshall in the semifinals by a score of 24–21. The team played home games at Veterans Memorial Stadium in Troy, Alabama.

== Schedule ==
Date	Opponent	Rank	Site	Result	Attendance	Source
September 6	at UAB	No. 12	Legion Field; Birmingham, AL	W 37–3	14,207	
September 11	at Northwestern State	No. 9	Harry Turpin Stadium; Natchitoches, LA	W 21–14		
September 18	at Nicholls State	No. 8	John L. Guidry Stadium; Thibodaux, LA	W 24–17		
September 25	at Alabama State	No. 5	Cramton Bowl; Montgomery, AL	W 38–3	19,137	
October 2	Charleston Southern	No. 5	Veterans Memorial Stadium; Troy, AL	W 56–0	7,200	
October 9	Liberty	No. 3	Veterans Memorial Stadium; Troy, AL	W 35–13		
October 23	Central State (OH)^{†}	No. 2	Veterans Memorial Stadium; Troy, AL	T 21–21	12,100	
October 30	No. 6 UCF	No. 5	Veterans Memorial Stadium; Troy, AL	W 29–15	5,100	
November 6	No. 24 Western Kentucky	No. 4	Veterans Memorial Stadium; Troy, AL	W 31–24	5,100	
November 13	No. 15 Alcorn State	No. 4	Veterans Memorial Stadium; Troy, AL	W 63–21		
November 20	at Samford	No. 1	Seibert Stadium; Homewood, AL	W 52–24		
November 27	No. 14 Stephen F. Austin	No. 1	Veterans Memorial Stadium; Troy, AL (NCAA Division I-AA First Round)	W 42–20	4,500	
December 4	at No. 5 McNeese State	No. 1	Cowboy Stadium; Lake Charles, LA (NCAA Division I-AA Quarterfinal)	W 35–28		
December 11	at No. 9 Marshall	No. 1	Marshall University Stadium; Huntington, WV (NCAA Division I-AA Semifinal)	L 21–24	14,472	
^{†}Homecoming; Rankings from The Sports Network Poll released prior to the game
