= 1993 UCF Golden Knights football team =

American college football season

1993 UCF Golden Knights football
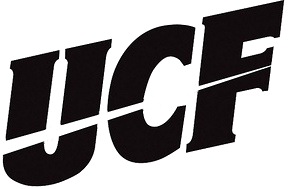

NCAA Division I-AA First Round, L 30–56 at Youngstown State
- Conference: Independent

Ranking
- Sports Network: No. 12
- Record: 9–3
- Head coach: Gene McDowell (9th season)
- Offensive coordinator: Mike Kruczek (9th season)
- Defensive coordinator: Ron McCrone (2nd season)
- Home stadium: Florida Citrus Bowl

1993 NCAA Division I-AA independents football standings
	Conf.			Overall
Team	W	L	T	W		L		T
No. 1 Troy State ^		–		11	–	0	–	1
Youngstown State ^		–		10	–	2	–	0
UAB		–		9	–	2	–	0
Wagner		–		9	–	2	–	0
No. 12 UCF ^		–		9	–	3	–	0
No. 24 Towson State		–		8	–	2	–	0
No. 19 Western Kentucky		–		8	–	3	–	0
Hofstra		–		6	–	3	–	1
Saint Mary's		–		6	–	3	–	1
Davidson		–		6	–	4	–	0
Central Connecticut State		–		5	–	5	–	0
Liberty		–		5	–	5	–	0
Marist		–		5	–	5	–	0
Samford		–		5	–	6	–	0
Duquesne		–		4	–	6	–	0
Saint Francis (PA)		–		3	–	7	–	0
Charleston Southern		–		3	–	8	–	0
Monmouth		–		2	–	5	–	0
Buffalo		–		1	–	10	–	0
^ – NCAA Division I-AA playoff participant; Rankings from The Sports Network poll

The 1993 UCF Golden Knights football season represented the University of Central Florida (UCF) as an independent during the 1993 NCAA Division I-AA football season. Led by ninth-year head coach Gene McDowell, the Golden Knights compiling a record of 9–3 for the program's eighth consecutive winning season. UCF advanced to the NCAA Division I-AA Football Championship playoffs for the second time in four years, where the Golden Knights lost in the first round to the eventual national champion, Youngstown State.

At 6–1 by late October, UCF had the best start in program history. Their only loss early on was to East Carolina, an NCAA Division I-A team. The Golden Knights won three of their last four regular season games, including the program's first win over a I-A team, a 38–16 victory over Louisiana Tech.

Starting in 1993, and continuing through the 2006 season, the program was nicknamed the "Golden Knights." Before 1993, and since 2007, UCF's sports programs have been simply known as the "Knights." The name change was proposed in 1993 by then athletic director Steve Sloan as a way to boost the popularity of the program and to boost merchandise sales.

== Schedule ==
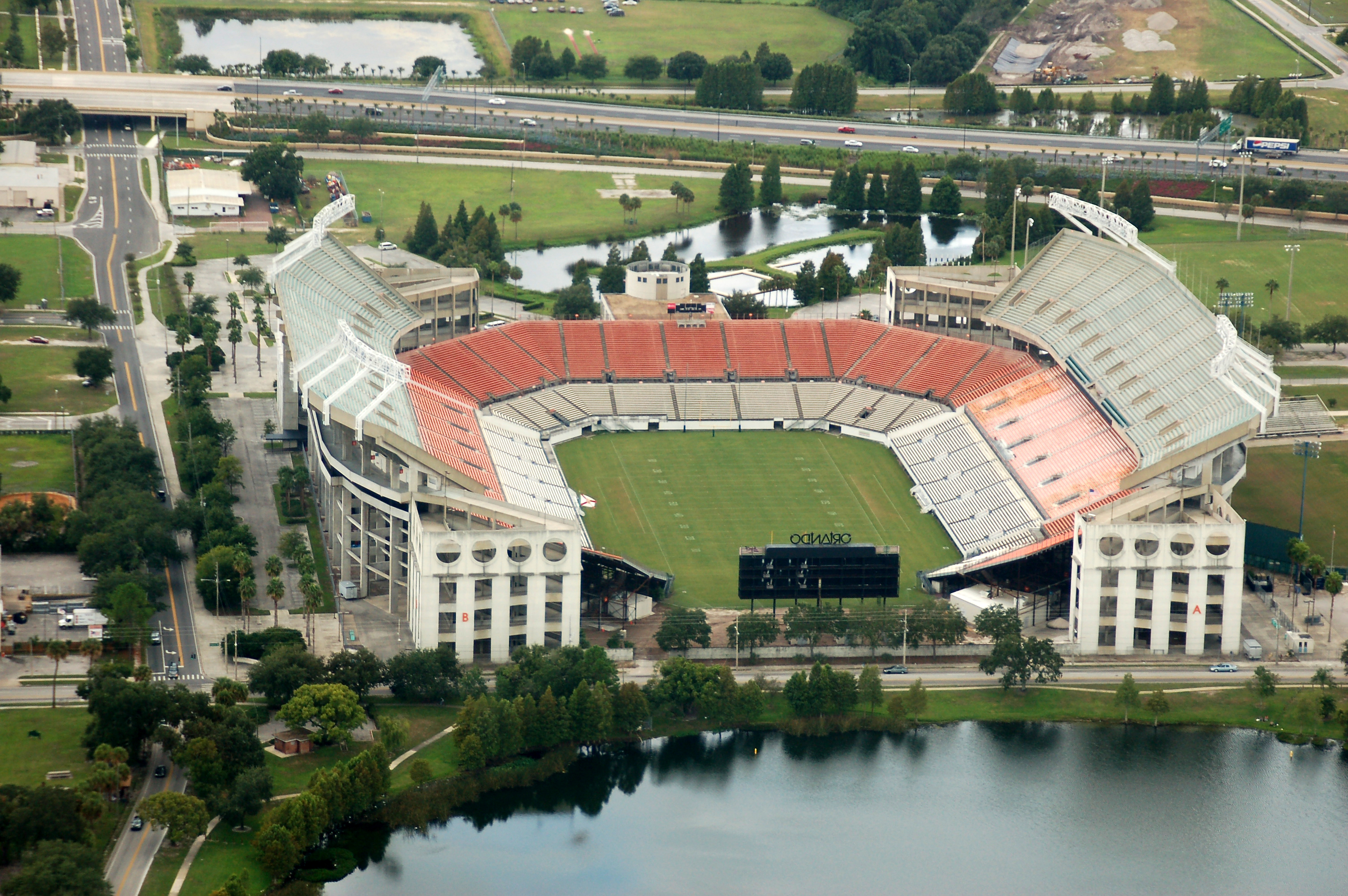
The Florida Citrus Bowl, the Knights' home field

Date	Opponent	Rank	Site	Result	Attendance	Source
September 11	No. 12 (D-II) Valdosta State	No. 23	Florida Citrus Bowl; Orlando, FL	W 35–30	11,033	
September 18	at East Carolina	No. 20	Ficklen Memorial Stadium; Greenville, NC	L 17–41	30,867	
September 25	No. 10 McNeese State	No. 22	Florida Citrus Bowl; Orlando, FL	W 22–3	10,759	
October 2	Yale	No. 16	Florida Citrus Bowl; Orlando, FL	W 42–28	23,489	
October 9	No. 9 Samford	No. 16	Florida Citrus Bowl; Orlando, FL	W 48–17	8,081	
October 16	Western Illinois	No. 11	Florida Citrus Bowl; Orlando, FL	W 35–17	12,857	
October 23	at Bethune–Cookman	No. 11	Municipal Stadium; Daytona Beach, FL	W 34–14	5,500	
October 30	at No. 5 Troy State	No. 6	Veterans Memorial Stadium; Troy, AL	L 15–29	5,100	
November 6	Liberty	No. 13	Florida Citrus Bowl; Orlando, FL	W 55–19	8,688	
November 13	Buffalo	No. 12	Florida Citrus Bowl; Orlando, FL	W 42–7	7,609	
November 20	at Louisiana Tech	No. 12	Joe Aillet Stadium; Ruston, LA	W 38–16	4,000	
November 27	at No. 7 Youngstown State	No. 12	Stambaugh Stadium; Youngstown, OH (NCAA Division I-AA First Round)	L 30–56	7,408	
Rankings from The Sports Network Poll released prior to the game
