= 1993 NCAA Division I-AA football rankings =

The 1993 NCAA Division I-AA football rankings are from the Sports Network poll of Division I-AA head coaches, athletic directors, sports information directors and media members. This is for the 1993 season.

== Legend ==
	Increase in ranking
	Decrease in ranking
	Not ranked previous week
(#–#)	Win–loss record
(Italics)	Number of first place votes
т	Tied with team above or below also with this symbol

== The Sports Network poll ==
	Preseason	Week 1 Sept 8	Week 2 Sept 15	Week 3 Sept 22	Week 4 Sept 29	Week 5 Oct 6	Week 6 Oct 13	Week 7 Oct 20	Week 8 Oct 27	Week 9 Nov 3	Week 10 Nov 10	Week 11 Nov 17	Week 12 Nov 24	Week 13 Dec 1	
1.	Marshall (37)	Marshall (1–0) (43)	Marshall (2–0) (46)	Marshall (3–0) (49)	Marshall (3–0) (50)	Idaho (4–0) (51)	Idaho (5–0) (58)	Idaho (6–0) (54)	Youngstown State (6–1) (32)	Youngstown State (7–1) (37)	Youngstown State (8–1) (39)	Troy State (9–0–1) (25)	Troy State (10–0–1) (27)	Troy State (11–0–1) (27)	1.
2.	Middle Tennessee State (6)	Youngstown State (1–0) (7)	McNeese State (2–0) (5)	Idaho (3–0) (11)	Idaho (3–0) (11)	Delaware (4–0) (10)	Troy State (6–0) (3)	Troy State (6–0) (6)	Marshall (5–2) (12)	Marshall (6–2) (10)	Marshall (7–2) (6)	Georgia Southern (8–2) (21)	Georgia Southern (9–2) (16)	Georgia Southern (10–2) (16)	2.
3.	Youngstown State (10)	Delaware (1–0)	Delaware (2–0)	Delaware (3–0) (1)	Delaware (4–0) (1)	Troy State (5–0)	Marshall (4–1)	Youngstown State (5–1)	Georgia Southern (6–2) (6)	Georgia Southern (6–2) (3)	Georgia Southern (7–2) (3)	Montana (10–1) (9)	Montana (10–1) (7)	Montana (10–2) (7)	3.
4.	Northern Iowa	McNeese State (1–0) (3)	Idaho (2–0) (7)	Middle Tennessee State (1–1)	Middle Tennessee State (2–1)	NE Louisiana (4–1) (1)	Youngstown State (4–1)	Marshall (4–2)	Montana (7–1) (4)	Troy State (7–0–1) (4)	Troy State (8–0–1) (4)	NE Louisiana (8–2) (1)	NE Louisiana (9–2) (3)	NE Louisiana (9–3) (3)	4.
5.	Delaware	Idaho (1–0)	NE Louisiana (2–0) (4)	Troy State (3–0)	Troy State (4–0)	Marshall (3–1)	North Carolina A&T (5–0)	North Carolina A&T (6–0)	Troy State (6–0–1) (6)	Montana (8–1) (3)	Montana (9–1) (6)	McNeese State (8–2) (1)	McNeese State (9–2) (2)	McNeese State (10–2) (2)	5.
6.	Idaho (5)	NE Louisiana (1–0) (1)	Middle Tennessee State (0–1)	NE Louisiana (2–1) (1)	NE Louisiana (3–1)	Youngstown State (3–1)	Georgia Southern (4–2) (1)	Georgia Southern (5–2) (2)	UCF (6–1)	Idaho (7–1) (3)	NE Louisiana (7–2)	Boston University (10–0) (4)	Boston University (11–0) (3)	Boston University (12–0) (3)	6.
7.	McNeese State (1)	Middle Tennessee State (0–1) (1)	Georgia Southern (2–0)	Youngstown State (2–1)	Georgia Southern (3–1)	North Carolina A&T (4–0)	Delaware (4–1)	Delaware (5–1)	Idaho (6–1)	NE Louisiana (6–2)	McNeese State (7–2)	Youngstown State (8–2)	Youngstown State (9–2) (1)	Youngstown State (10–2) (1)	7.
8.	Western Carolina (1)	Georgia Southern (1–0)	Troy State (2–0)	Georgia Southern (2–1)	Youngstown State (2–1)	Georgia Southern (3–2)	Montana (5–1)	Montana (6–1)	NE Louisiana (6–2)	McNeese State (6–2)	Boston University (9–0) (3)	Howard (10–0) (1)	Howard (11–0) (3)	Howard (11–1) (3)	8.
9.	NE Louisiana (2)	Troy State (1–0)	Richmond (2–0)	Alcorn State (3–0)	North Carolina A&T (3–0)	Samford (4–1)	Northern Iowa (4–2)	Northern Iowa (5–2)	McNeese State (5–2)	Boston University (8–0) (1)	Howard (9–0) (1)	Marshall (7–3)	Marshall (8–3)	Marshall (9–3)	9.
10.	Eastern Kentucky	Northern Iowa (0–1)	Youngstown State (1–1)	McNeese State (2–1)	Samford (3–1)	Middle Tennessee State (2–2)	Stephen F. Austin (4–1)	Stephen F. Austin (5–1)	Boston University (7–0)	Howard (8–0) (1)	William & Mary (7–2)	William & Mary (8–2)	William & Mary (9–2)	William & Mary (9–3)	10.
11.	Georgia Southern	William & Mary (1–0)	Alcorn State (2–0)	Western Carolina (1–1)	Northern Iowa (2–2)	Northern Iowa (3–2)	UCF (4–1)	UCF (5–1)	Howard (7–0)	William & Mary (6–2)	Idaho (7–2)	Idaho (8–2)	Idaho (9–2)	Idaho (10–2)	11.
12.	Troy State	Samford (1–0)	Western Carolina (0–1)	North Carolina A&T (2–0)	Montana (3–1)	Montana (4–1)	NE Louisiana (4–2)	NE Louisiana (5–2)	Southern (8–0)	North Carolina A&T (7–1)	UCF (7–2)	UCF (8–2)	UCF (9–2)	UCF (9–3)	12.
13.	The Citadel (2)	Western Carolina (0–1) (1)	North Carolina A&T (2–0)	Samford (2–1)	Stephen F. Austin (3–1)	Stephen F. Austin (3–1)	McNeese State (3–2)	McNeese State (4–2)	William & Mary (5–2)	UCF (6–2)	Northern Iowa (7–3)	Northern Iowa (8–3)	Northern Iowa (8–3)	Northern Iowa (8–4)	13.
14.	Samford	Richmond (1–0)	Northern Iowa (0–2)	Northern Iowa (1–2)	Florida A&M (3–0)	Richmond (4–1)	Richmond (5–1)	Alcorn State (5–1)	North Carolina A&T (6–1)	Delaware (6–2)	Southern (9–1)	Southern (9–1)	Stephen F. Austin (8–3)	Stephen F. Austin (8–4)	14.
15.	William & Mary	Alcorn State (1–0)	Samford (1–1)	Liberty (3–0)	Richmond (3–1)	Alcorn State (4–1)	Alcorn State (4–1)	Boston University (6–0)	Delaware (5–2)	Northern Iowa (6–3)	Alcorn State (7–2)	Penn (9–0)	Southern (9–1)	Southern (9–1)	15.
16.	Villanova	SW Missouri State (1–0)	Jackson State (2–0)	Montana (2–1)	UCF (2–1)	UCF (3–1)	Southern (6–0)	Southern (7–0)	Stephen F. Austin (5–2)	Princeton (7–0)	Western Carolina (6–3)	North Carolina A&T (8–2)	Penn (10–0)	Penn (10–0)	16.
17.	SW Missouri State	North Carolina A&T (1–0)	William & Mary (1–1)	Florida A&M (3–0)	Alcorn State (3–1)	William & Mary (3–2)	William & Mary (3–2)	William & Mary (4–2)	Northern Iowa (5–3)	Southern (8–1)	Penn (8–0)	Stephen F. Austin (7–3)	Eastern Kentucky (8–3)	Eastern Kentucky (8–4)	17.
18.	Appalachian State	Eastern Kentucky (0–1)	Liberty (2–0)	Stephen F. Austin (2–1)	William & Mary (2–2)	McNeese State (2–2)	Boston University (5–0)	Western Kentucky (5–1)	Princeton (6–0)	Alcorn State (6–2)	North Carolina A&T (7–2)	Eastern Kentucky (7–3)	Delaware (8–3)	Delaware (9–3)	18.
19.	Richmond	Villanova (0–0)	Montana (1–1)	Richmond (2–1)	McNeese State (2–2)	Southern (5–0)	Samford (4–2)	Howard (6–0)	Middle Tennessee State (4–3)	Montana State (7–2)	Stephen F. Austin (6–3)	Delaware (7–3)	Western Kentucky (8–3)	Western Kentucky (8–3)	19.
20.	Alcorn State	Jackson State (1–0)	UCF (1–0)	William & Mary (1–2)	Illinois State (3–1)	Western Carolina (2–2)	Northern Arizona (6–0)	Middle Tennessee State (3–3)	Alcorn State (5–2)	Western Carolina (5–3)	Eastern Kentucky (6–3)	Western Kentucky (7–3)	Eastern Washington (7–3)	Eastern Washington (7–3)	20.
21.	Jackson State	Montana (1–0)	SW Missouri State (1–1)	Jackson State (2–1)	Southern (4–0)	Western Kentucky (4–1)	Western Kentucky (4–1)	Princeton (5–0)	Richmond (5–2)	Penn (7–0)	UMass (7–2)	Princeton (8–1)	North Carolina A&T (8–3)	North Carolina A&T (8–3)	21.
22.	Montana	Furman (1–0)	Stephen F. Austin (1–1)	UCF (1–1)	Western Carolina (1–2)	Florida A&M (3–1)	Howard (5–0)	Richmond (5–2)	Western Carolina (4–3)	Stephen F. Austin (5–3)	Delaware (6–3)	Eastern Washington (7–3)	Tennessee Tech (8–3)	Tennessee Tech (8–3)	22.
23.	UCF	UCF (0–0)	Florida A&M (2–0)	Villanova (1–1)	Furman (2–1–1)	Boston University (4–0)	Middle Tennessee State (2–3)	Northern Arizona (6–1)	Penn (6–0)	Eastern Kentucky (5–3)	Middle Tennessee State (5–4)	Alcorn State (7–3)	Alcorn State (8–3)	Alcorn State (8–3)	23.
24.	Western Illinois	The Citadel (0–1)	Furman (1–1)	Illinois State (2–1)	Liberty (3–1)	Northern Arizona (5–0)	Princeton (4–0)	Western Carolina (3–3)	Montana State (6–2)	Western Kentucky (6–2)	Princeton (7–1)	Tennessee Tech (7–3)	Towson State (8–2)	Towson State (8–2)	24.
25.	North Carolina A&T	Liberty (1–0)	UMass (1–0)	Southern (3–0)	Western Kentucky (3–1)	Howard (4–0)	Western Carolina (2–3)	Penn (5–0)	Eastern Kentucky (4–3)	UMass (6–2)	Western Kentucky (6–3)	Towson State (7–2)	UMass (8–3)	UMass (8–3)	25.
	Preseason	Week 1 Sept 8	Week 2 Sept 15	Week 3 Sept 22	Week 4 Sept 29	Week 5 Oct 6	Week 6 Oct 13	Week 7 Oct 20	Week 8 Oct 27	Week 9 Nov 3	Week 10 Nov 10	Week 11 Nov 17	Week 12 Nov 24	Week 13 Dec 1	
		Dropped: 18 Appalachian State; 24 Western Illinois	Dropped: 18 Eastern Kentucky; 19 Villanova; 24 The Citadel	Dropped: 21 SW Missouri State; 24 Furman; 25 UMass	Dropped: 21 Jackson State; 23 Villanova	Dropped: 20 Illinois State; 23 Furman; 24 Liberty	Dropped: 22 Florida A&M	Dropped: 19 Samford	Dropped: 18 Western Kentucky; 23 Northern Arizona	Dropped: 19 Middle Tennessee State; 21 Richmond	Dropped: 19 Montana State	Dropped: 16 Western Carolina; 21 UMass; 23 Middle Tennessee State	Dropped: 21 Princeton	None	
