= List of Idaho State Bengals football seasons =

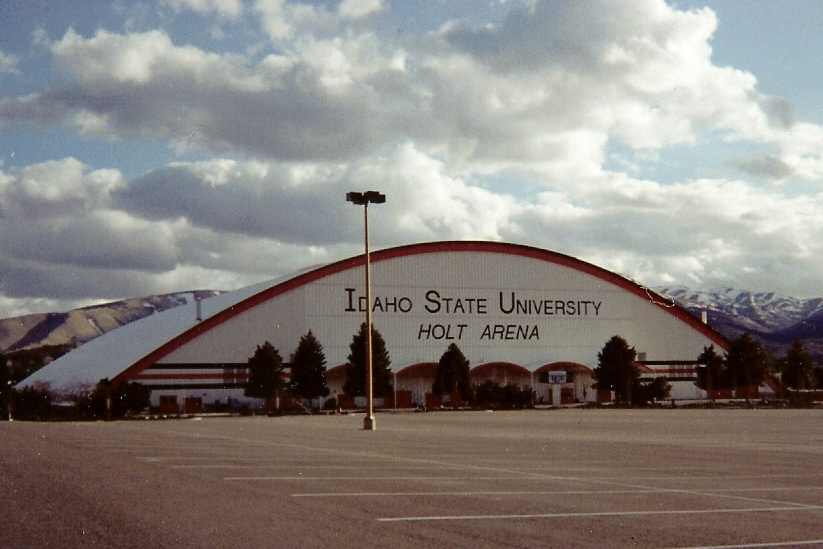
Holt Arena, the home of Idaho State football since 1970.

This is a list of seasons completed by the Idaho State Bengals football team. Representing Idaho State University in Pocatello, Idaho, the Bengals compete in the Big Sky Conference at the NCAA Division I FCS level, as they have since 1963. Idaho State plays their home games at the 12,000-seat Holt Arena.

The Bengals won their first and only national championship in 1981, defeating Eastern Kentucky in the Division I-AA (now FCS) title game. They have eight conference championships in program history, including five in the Rocky Mountain Athletic Conference and three in the Big Sky. They have finished the season ranked eight times, most recently in 2014.

The current head coach of Idaho State is Cody Hawkins, who begins his first season in 2023.

== Seasons ==
Legend

† National champions
^{†} Conference champions
^ Bowl game berth / playoff result

List of Idaho State Bengals football seasons
Season	Team	Head coach	Conference	Regular season results							Postseason results	Final ranking	
Season	Team	Head coach	Conference	Overall			Conference				Bowl game/Playoff result	STATS/NCAA Poll (Note: Since Division I was split into subdivisions, the NCAA poll was the major poll used at the I-AA (FCS) level until 1992, when it was replaced by The Sports Network poll. Beginning in 2015, the FCS now uses the STATS poll.)	Coaches' Poll
Season	Team	Head coach	Conference	Win	Loss	Tie	Win	Loss	Tie	Finish	Bowl game/Playoff result	STATS/NCAA Poll	Coaches' Poll
Academy of Idaho Bantams
1902	1902	Herbert Cheney	Independent	5	0	0				—	—	—	—
1903	1903	Herbert Cheney	Independent	0	1	1				—	—	—	—
1904	1904	Charles Rowe	Independent	1	3	0				—	—	—	—
1905	1905	Hubert Upjohn	Independent	3	0	2				—	—	—	—
1906	1906	Hubert Upjohn	Independent	0	2	1				—	—	—	—
1907	1907	John Morris	Independent	6	3	0				—	—	—	—
1908	1908	John Morris	Independent	2	2	0				—	—	—	—
1909	1909	Harvey Holmes	Independent	4	0	0				—	—	—	—
1910	1910	Harvey Holmes	Independent	6	0	0				—	—	—	—
1911	1911	Harvey Holmes	Independent	6	3	0				—	—	—	—
1912	1912	Harvey Holmes	Independent	1	2	0				—	—	—	—
1913	1913	Harvey Holmes	Independent	6	1	0				—	—	—	—
1914	1914	Harvey Holmes	Independent	6	1	0				—	—	—	—
Idaho Technical Tigers
1915	1915	Reuben Bronson	Independent	4	3	0				—	—	—	—
1916	1916	Reuben Bronson	Independent	5	2	0				—	—	—	—
1917	1917	John A. Fogt	Independent	2	2	0				—	—	—	—
1918		John A. Fogt	Independent	Season canceled due to influenza epidemic									
1919	1919	Reuben Bronson	Independent	2	3	1				—	—	—	—
1920	1920	Ralph Hutchinson	Independent	3	3	0				—	—	—	—
1921	1921	Ralph Hutchinson	Independent	6	2	0				—	—	—	—
1922	1922	Ralph Hutchinson	Independent	4	3	0				—	—	—	—
1923	1923	Ralph Hutchinson	Independent	3	2	1				—	—	—	—
1924	1924	Ralph Hutchinson	Independent	5	2	0				—	—	—	—
1925	1925	Ralph Hutchinson	Independent	2	4	0				—	—	—	—
1926	1926	Ralph Hutchinson	Independent	1	4	0				—	—	—	—
Idaho Southern Branch Tigers
1927	1927	Ralph Hutchinson	Independent	1	4	1				—	—	—	—
1928	1928	Felix Plastino	Independent	5	1	1				—	—	—	—
1929	1929	Felix Plastino	Independent	6	4	0				—	—	—	—
1930	1930	Felix Plastino	Independent	4	3	0				—	—	—	—
1931	1931	Felix Plastino	Independent	7	1	0				—	—	—	—
1932	1932	Felix Plastino	Independent	3	4	1				—	—	—	—
1933	1933	Felix Plastino	Independent	5	1	0				—	—	—	—
1934	1934	Felix Plastino	Independent	4	2	1				—	—	—	—
Idaho Southern Branch Bengals
1935	1935	Guy Wicks	Independent	7	0	1				—	—	—	—
1936	1936	Guy Wicks	Independent	4	4	0				—	—	—	—
1937	1937	Guy Wicks	Independent	6	3	0				—	—	—	—
1938	1938	Guy Wicks	Independent	4	3	0				—	—	—	—
1939	1939	Guy Wicks	Independent	5	2	0				—	—	—	—
1940	1940	Guy Wicks	Independent	3	5	0				—	—	—	—
1941	1941	John Vesser	Independent	5	1	2				—	—	—	—
1942	1942	John Vesser	Independent	4	2	0				—	—	—	—
1943		John Vesser	Independent	No team due to World War II									
1944	1946	John Vesser	Independent	4	5	0				—	—	—	—
1945		John Vesser	Independent	No team due to World War II									
1946	1946	John Vesser	Independent	4	3	1				—	—	—	—
Idaho State Bengals
1947	1947	John Vesser	Independent	3	5	1				—	—	—	—
1948	1948	John Vesser	Independent	6	1	1				—	—	—	—
1949	1949	John Vesser	Independent	6	2	1				—	—	—	—
1950	1950	John Vesser	Rocky Mountain	4	4	0	4	1	0	T-2nd	—	—	—
1951	1951	John Vesser	Rocky Mountain	5	4	0	3	2	0	T-2nd	—	—	—
1952	1952^{†}	Babe Caccia	Rocky Mountain	8	0	0	5	0	0	1st^{†}	—	—	—
1953	1953^{†}	Babe Caccia	Rocky Mountain	6	2	0	5	0	0	1st^{†}	—	—	—
1954	1954	Babe Caccia	Rocky Mountain	4	4	0	3	2	0	3rd	—	—	—
1955	1955^{†}	Babe Caccia	Rocky Mountain	8	1	0	5	0	0	1st^{†}	—	—	—
1956	1956	Babe Caccia	Rocky Mountain	6	3	0	3	2	0	2nd	—	—	—
1957	1957^{†}	Babe Caccia	Rocky Mountain	9	0	0	6	0	0	1st^{†}	—	—	—
1958	1958	Babe Caccia	Rocky Mountain	4	5	0	3	3	0	T-3rd	—	—	—
1959	1959^{†}	Babe Caccia	Rocky Mountain	6	2	0	4	0	0	1st^{†}	—	—	16
1960	1960	Babe Caccia	Rocky Mountain	6	2	0	3	1	0	2nd	—	—	—
1961	1961	Babe Caccia	Independent	5	2	1				—	—	—	13
1962	1962	Babe Caccia	Independent	3	6	0				—	—	—	—
1963	1963^{†}	Babe Caccia	Big Sky	5	3	0	3	1	0	1st^{†}	—	—	—
1964	1964	Babe Caccia	Big Sky	6	3	0	3	1	0	2nd	—	—	—
1965	1965	Babe Caccia	Big Sky	3	5	1	1	3	0	T-4th	—	—	—
1966	1966	Leo McKillip	Big Sky	3	6	0	1	3	0	4th	—	—	—
1967	1967	Leo McKillip	Big Sky	1	9	0	0	4	0	5th	—	—	—
1968	1968	Ed Cavanaugh	Big Sky	4	5	0	1	3	0	4th	—	—	—
1969	1969	Ed Cavanaugh	Big Sky	5	5	0	2	2	0	3rd	—	—	—
1970	1970	Ed Cavanaugh	Big Sky	5	5	0	3	2	0	3rd	—	—	—
1971	1971	Ed Cavanaugh	Big Sky	6	4	0	2	3	0	5th	—	—	—
1972	1972	Bob Griffin	Big Sky	7	3	0	4	1	0	2nd	—	—	14
1973 (Note: The NCAA switched to its current divisional system in 1973. Idaho State was classified as a Division II program (formerly College Division).)	1973	Bob Griffin	Big Sky	2	9	0	0	6	0	7th	—	—	—
1974	1974	Bob Griffin	Big Sky	5	5	0	2	4	0	6th	—	—	—
1975	1975	Bob Griffin	Big Sky	7	3	0	4	2	0	2nd	—	—	—
1976	1976	Joe Pascale	Big Sky	1	9	0	0	6	0	7th	—	—	—
1977	1977	Bud Hake	Big Sky	3	8	0	2	4	0	T-4th	—	—	—
1978 (Note: The NCAA split Division I into subdivisions in 1978. Idaho State, along with the rest of the Big Sky Conference, moved up to I-AA.)	1978	Bud Hake	Big Sky	2	8	0	0	6	0	7th	—	—	—
1979	1979	Bud Hake	Big Sky	0	11	0	0	7	0	8th	—	—	—
1980	1980	Dave Kragthorpe	Big Sky	6	5	0	4	4	0	T-4th	—	—	—
1981	1981†	Dave Kragthorpe	Big Sky	12	1	0	6	1	0	1st^{†}	NCAA Division I-AA Playoffs — National Champions ^	2	—
1982	1982	Dave Kragthorpe	Big Sky	3	8	0	1	6	0	8th	–	–	—
1983	1983	Jim Koetter	Big Sky	8	4	0	5	2	0	2nd	NCAA Division I-AA Playoffs — First Round ^	12	—
1984	1984	Jim Koetter	Big Sky	5	6	0	4	3	0	T-3rd	—	—	—
1985	1985	Jim Koetter	Big Sky	5	6	0	3	4	0	5th	—	—	—
1986	1986	Jim Koetter	Big Sky	2	9	0	1	7	0	8th	—	—	—
1987	1987	Jim Koetter	Big Sky	3	7	1	3	5	0	7th	—	—	—
1988	1988	Garth Hall	Big Sky	0	11	0	0	8	0	9th	—	—	—
1989	1989	Garth Hall	Big Sky	3	7	0	2	6	0	T-6th	—	—	—
1990	1990	Garth Hall	Big Sky	3	8	0	1	7	0	9th	—	—	—
1991	1991	Garth Hall	Big Sky	3	7	1	2	6	0	7th	—	—	—
1992	1992	Brian McNeely	Big Sky	3	8	0	1	6	0	8th	—	—	—
1993	1993	Brian McNeely	Big Sky	2	9	0	0	7	0	8th	—	—	—
1994	1994	Brian McNeely	Big Sky	6	5	0	4	3	0	T-4th	—	—	—
1995	1995	Brian McNeely	Big Sky	6	5	0	4	3	0	6th	—	—	—
1996 (Note: Overtime rules were added for NCAA football in 1996, thereby eliminating ties.)	1996	Brian McNeely	Big Sky	4	7		2	6		7th	—	—	—
1997	1997	Tom Walsh	Big Sky	3	8		2	6		8th	—	—	—
1998	1998	Tom Walsh	Big Sky	3	8		2	6		9th	—	—	—
1999	1999	Larry Lewis	Big Sky	4	7		2	6		T-7th	—	—	—
2000	2000	Larry Lewis	Big Sky	6	5		4	4		6th	—	—	—
2001	2001	Larry Lewis	Big Sky	4	7		1	6		T-7th	—	—	—
2002	2002^{†}	Larry Lewis	Big Sky	8	3		5	2		T-1st^{†}	–	18	—
2003	2003	Larry Lewis	Big Sky	8	4		4	3		T-4th	—	22	—
2004	2004	Larry Lewis	Big Sky	3	8		2	5		T-6th	—	—	—
2005	2005	Larry Lewis	Big Sky	5	6		3	4		6th	—	—	—
2006	2006	Larry Lewis	Big Sky	2	9		1	7		8th	—	—	—
2007	2007	John Zamberlin	Big Sky	3	8		2	6		8th	—	—	—
2008	2008	John Zamberlin	Big Sky	1	10		1	7		T-8th	—	—	—
2009	2009	John Zamberlin	Big Sky	1	10		1	7		T-7th	—	—	—
2010	2010	John Zamberlin	Big Sky	1	10		0	8		9th	—	—	—
2011	2011	Mike Kramer	Big Sky	2	9		1	7		8th	—	—	—
2012	2012	Mike Kramer	Big Sky	1	10		0	8		13th	—	—	—
2013	2013	Mike Kramer	Big Sky	3	9		1	7		T-11th	—	—	—
2014	2014	Mike Kramer	Big Sky	8	4		6	2		T-2nd	—	25	—
2015	2015	Mike Kramer	Big Sky	2	9		1	7		T-12th	—	—	—
2016	2016	Mike Kramer	Big Sky	2	9		1	7		13th	—	—	—
2017	2017	Rob Phenicie	Big Sky	4	7		2	6		T-9th	—	—	—
2018	2018	Rob Phenicie	Big Sky	6	5		5	3		T-4th	—	—	—
2019	2019	Rob Phenicie	Big Sky	3	9		2	6		T-9th	—	—	—
2020 (Note: The Fall 2020 Big Sky football season was delayed due to the COVID-19 pandemic, with league play resuming in a shortened Spring 2021 season.)	2020	Rob Phenicie	Big Sky	2	4		2	4		5th	—	—	—
2021	2021	Rob Phenicie	Big Sky	1	10		1	7		T-11th	—	—	—
2022	2022	Charlie Ragle	Big Sky	1	10		1	7		T-11th	—	—	—
2023	2023	Cody Hawkins	Big Sky	3	8		3	5		T-9th	—	—	—
2024	2024	Cody Hawkins	Big Sky	5	7		3	5		T-6th	—	—	—
2025	2025	Cody Hawkins	Big Sky	6	6		5	3		T-4	—	—	—
Totals				All-time: 493–572–21 (.464)			Conference: 179–314 (.363)				Postseason: 3–1 (.750)		
