= Idaho–Idaho State football rivalry =

American college football rivalry

- Idaho Vandals Idaho State Bengals
- Sport: Football
- First meeting: November 27, 1916; Idaho, 32–0
- Latest meeting: November 21, 2026; Idaho State, 19–5
- Next meeting: November 20, 2027 in Moscow
- Stadiums: Kibbie Dome (Idaho); ICCU Dome (Idaho State)
- Trophy: Potato State Trophy

Statistics
- Total meetings: 48
- All-time series: Idaho leads, 33–15 (.688)
- Trophy series: Idaho, 5–4 (.556)
- Largest victory: Idaho, 70–21 (1994); Idaho, 52–3 (1998)
- Smallest victory: Idaho, 1–0 (1978, forfeit)
- Longest win streak: Idaho, 8 (1916–1968)
- Current win streak: Idaho State, 2 (2025–present)

Campus locations in Idaho

The Idaho–Idaho State rivalry is the intrastate college football game in Idaho between the University of Idaho in Moscow and Idaho State University in Pocatello.

The series was played annually for 31 seasons from 1965 through 1995, until Idaho's move to the Football Bowl Subdivision (with Boise State), leaving Idaho State without an intrastate rival. Weber State, based in nearby Ogden, Utah, served as Idaho State's primary rival during Idaho's stay in the FBS. Annual play has resumed since Idaho's move back to the Football Championship Subdivision in 2018. The rivalry was at its most competitive in the 1970s and 1980s, with neither team three-peating. Idaho leads the overall series 33–15 (.688), and lead 5–4 (.556) since rejoining the Big Sky Conference in 2018.

A notable game of the series was not even played; in the conference finale for both teams in 1978, a night game was scheduled for Moscow on November 11, and ISU planned to fly up to the Palouse that Saturday afternoon in two vintage airplanes. One developed engine trouble shortly after takeoff from Pocatello and returned. Both teams were at the bottom of the Big Sky standings and the game was not rescheduled; Idaho was granted a 1–0 forfeit win.

College Comparison
	Idaho	Idaho State
Location	Moscow	Pocatello
Conference	Big Sky	
Students	12,286	12,157
School colors	Silver & gold	Orange & black
Nickname	Vandals	Bengals
Mascot(s)	Joe Vandal	Benny
Football stadium	Kibbie Dome	ICCU Dome

== Branding ==
In opposite regions of Idaho and in different time zones, the driving distance between the campuses is over 530 miles (855 km) through Boise, and over 610 miles (980 km) if routed through western Montana and Coeur d'Alene, a popular choice as it is mostly interstate (15, 90).

Idaho State was the first of the pair to play its home games indoors, opening the ICCU Dome (originally ASISU Minidome, later Holt Arena) in 1970. The Kibbie Dome in Moscow was enclosed in 1975, after four years as an outdoor venue; the last two outdoor games in this series were played there in 1971 (debut) and 1973, then the new Idaho Stadium.

From 1971 through 2010, Idaho's primary intrastate rivalry in football was with Boise State. While all three were in the Big Sky Conference (through 1995), they competed for the Gem State Trophy.

=== Battle of the Domes (2018–2023) ===
In 2017, Idaho Central Credit Union sponsored a rivalry between the two schools, titled "Battle of the Domes", the branding being applied to multiple sports. Five football games were played under the Battle of the Domes branding, Idaho winning in the 2019, 2021, and 2022 seasons, and Idaho State winning the inaugural game in 2018, alongside the 2020 season, which was delayed to spring 2021 due to the COVID-19 pandemic.

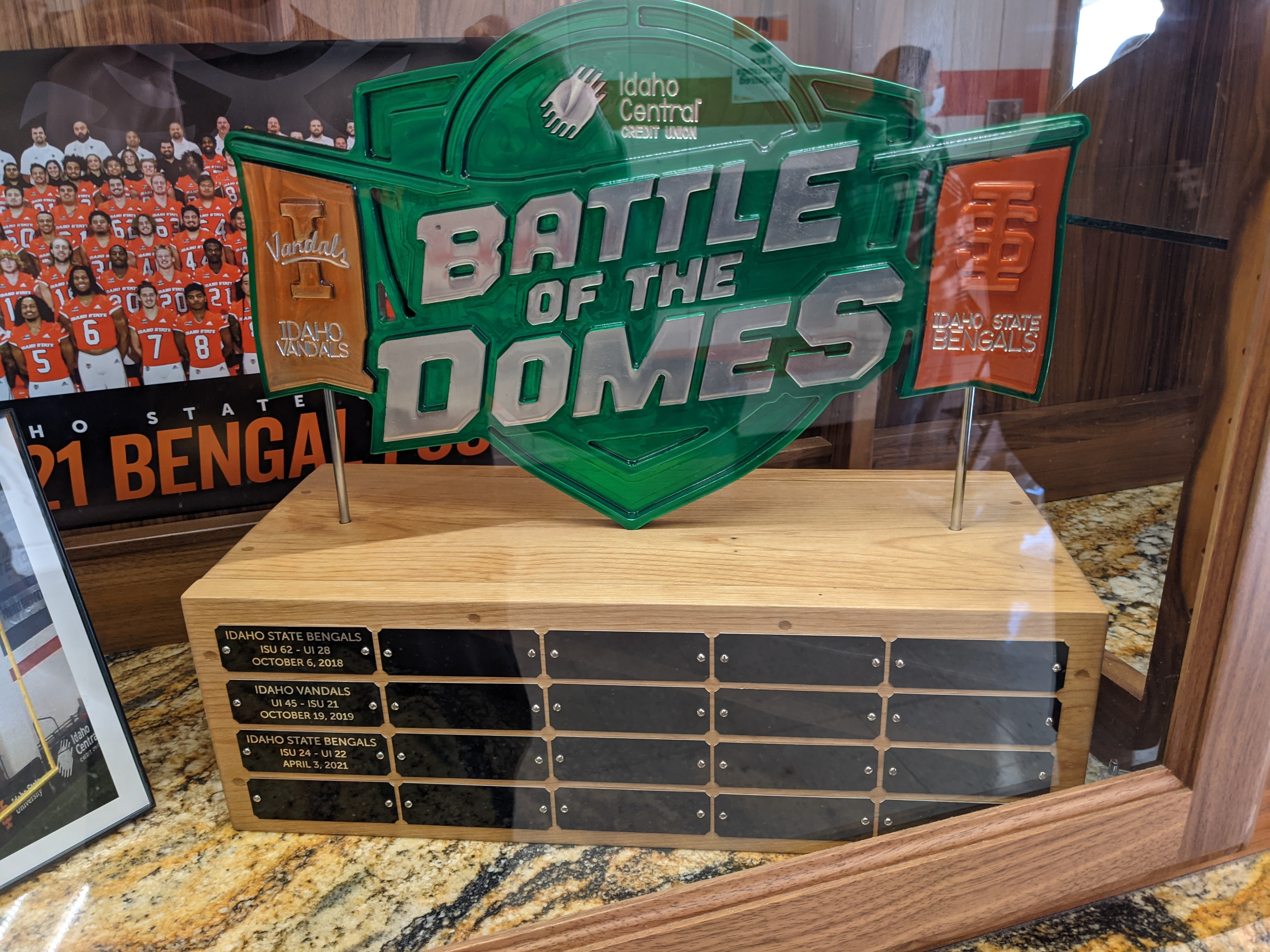
The Battle of the Domes trophy on display at ICCU Dome

With the introduction of the Battle of the Domes branding in 2017, a traveling trophy was also introduced. The Battle of the Domes trophy is prominently green (representing Idaho Central Credit Union's colors), and is mounted on a wooden base. There are 20 small plaques located on the base of the trophy, which were filled in after every football game between the two, detailing the winner, date, and score. The winner of the overall Battle of the Domes competition was awarded temporary possession of the trophy.

Ahead of the 2023 season, the Battle of the Domes branding was officially retired, after Idaho Central Credit Union adjusted their sponsorship with both institutions.

=== The Potato State Trophy (2024–present) ===
After the retirement of the Battle of the Domes branding, a temporary rivalry trophy was created by Idaho head coach Jason Eck, who put a Mr. Potato Head on the base of the original Battle of the Domes trophy. On July 21, 2024, a permanent trophy was formally introduced, called the "Potato State Trophy".

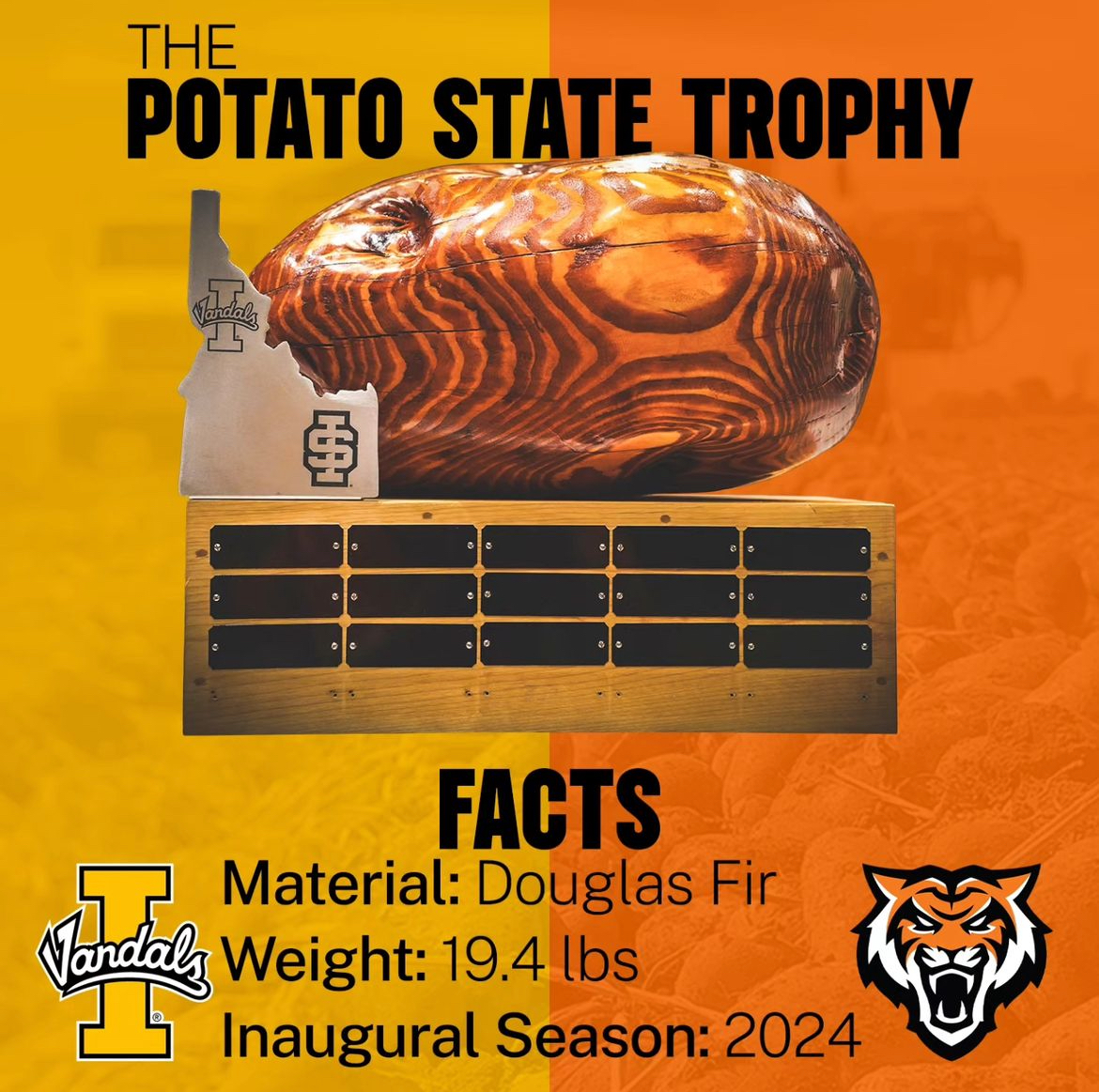

The trophy weighs 19.4 pounds (about 8.8 kilograms), and is made of Douglas Fir. It made its on-field debut in the 2024 season, and was first in possession of the Vandals after a 63–21 victory over the Bengals in 2023.

Idaho's Assistant Athletic Director for Brand Engagement & Digital Strategy, Jerek Wolcott, sculpted the potato, and Nick Davis, a wood and metal working teacher at Middleton High School, made the metal cutout.

== Notable games ==
=== 1916 ===
The first game in the series was held in Pocatello on November 27, 1916. The Vandals defeated the Bengals by a score of 32–0.

=== 1962 ===
Both the 1916 and 1929 games were in Pocatello; 1962 marks the first time that the rivalry game was played on the Palouse in Moscow. Host Idaho won a low-scoring 9–6 game.

=== 1969 ===
Idaho State ended the Vandals' eight-game winning streak in 1969 with a 47–42 upset on the road. Held in Pullman, Washington, it was Idaho State's first-ever win in the series. They won again the following year 35–14, which was also the first game in the series played indoors, at the ASISU Minidome (now ICCU Arena) in Pocatello. The next year, Idaho State was the first opponent in Moscow's new outdoor Idaho Stadium, the first game on campus in nearly three years; the Vandals won in a 40–3 rout and went on to become Big Sky champions.

=== 1975 ===
1975 was first game held inside the newly enclosed Kibbie Dome in September 1975, visiting Idaho State won by a score of 29–14.

=== 1978 ===
Late in the 1978 season, the two were scheduled to play at night in Moscow on November 11, but transportation issues caused Idaho State to forfeit, giving Idaho a 1–0 win. On game day, one of two vintage aircraft carrying the ISU team had mechanical issues and returned to Pocatello; it remains the closest game in the series.

=== 1995 ===
On September 30, 1995, Idaho State defeated Idaho 26–21, ending a seven-game losing streak. This was the last time they faced each other in conference play until 2018, with Idaho leaving Division I-AA for Division I-A (now Football Bowl Subdivision) in 1996. They played four times during Idaho's stay in the FBS, all of which were won by Idaho.

=== 2018 ===
Idaho rejoined the FCS and the Big Sky Conference in 2018, renewing the rivalry. Now dubbed the "Battle of the Domes," Idaho State won 62–28 in the first game under the new branding. They have played each other annually in a rivalry game during the last week of the regular season since then.

== Universities ==
The University of Idaho was established 137 years ago in 1889 by the territorial legislature and opened its doors three years later. Idaho State's origins date back to 1901; it was a two-year branch campus of the UI (1927–1947), became a four-year college in 1947, and a university in 1963.

== Accomplishments ==
Team	Idaho	Idaho State
National titles	0	1
Playoff appearances	11	2
Bowl appearances	3	2
Postseason bowl record	3–0 (1.00)	2–0 (1.00)
Conference titles	10	8
Big Sky titles	9	3
All-time program record	460–614–26 (.430)	478–543–20 (.469)

== Game results ==
Idaho victories	Idaho State victories

No.	Date	Location	Winner	Score
1	November 27, 1916	Pocatello, ID	Idaho	32–0
2	November 28, 1929	Pocatello, ID	Idaho	41–7
3	September 29, 1962	Moscow, ID	Idaho	9–6
4	November 16, 1963	Pocatello, ID	Idaho	14–0
5	November 13, 1965	Moscow, ID	Idaho	15–7
6	October 8, 1966	Pocatello, ID	Idaho	27–20
7	September 30, 1967	Boise, ID	Idaho	16–6
8	September 28, 1968	Pocatello, ID	Idaho	35–15
9	September 27, 1969	Pullman, WA	Idaho State	47–42
10	October 3, 1970	Pocatello, ID	Idaho State	35–14
11	October 9, 1971	Moscow, ID	Idaho	40–3
12	October 21, 1972	Pocatello, ID	Idaho State	35–7
13	November 17, 1973	Moscow, ID	Idaho	43–0
14	October 5, 1974	Pocatello, ID	Idaho	28–9
15	September 27, 1975	Moscow, ID	Idaho State	29–14
16	October 30, 1976	Pocatello, ID	Idaho	6–3
17	October 8, 1977	Moscow, ID	Idaho State	34–14
18	November 11, 1978	Moscow, ID	Idaho	1–0^
19	October 6, 1979	Pocatello, ID	Idaho	28–23
20	November 8, 1980	Moscow, ID	Idaho State	28–21
21	October 31, 1981	Moscow, ID	#3 Idaho State	24–14
22	November 6, 1982	Pocatello, ID	#14 Idaho	20–17
23	September 24, 1983	Pocatello, ID	#13 Idaho State	41–31
24	November 10, 1984	Moscow, ID	Idaho	45–42
25	October 26, 1985	Pocatello, ID	Idaho State	38–37

No.	Date	Location	Winner	Score
26	October 4, 1986	Moscow, ID	#17 Idaho	38–26
27	October 3, 1987	Pocatello, ID	Idaho State	30–21
28	November 12, 1988	Moscow, ID	#2 Idaho	41–7
29	November 4, 1989	Pocatello, ID	#7 Idaho	47–31
30	October 13, 1990	Moscow, ID	Idaho	41–20
31	October 19, 1991	Pocatello, ID	Idaho	46–21
32	October 10, 1992	Moscow, ID	#4 Idaho	49–18
33	October 9, 1993	Pocatello, ID	#1 Idaho	56–27
34	October 1, 1994	Moscow, ID	#6 Idaho	70–21
35	September 30, 1995	Pocatello, ID	#24 Idaho State	26–21
36	September 13, 1997	Pocatello, ID	Idaho	43–0
37	October 3, 1998	Moscow, ID	Idaho	52–3
38	September 16, 2006	Moscow, ID	Idaho	27–24
39	September 6, 2008	Moscow, ID	Idaho	42–27
40	October 6, 2018	Pocatello, ID	Idaho State	62–28
41	October 19, 2019	Moscow, ID	Idaho	45–21
42	April 3, 2021	Pocatello, ID	Idaho State	24–22
43	November 20, 2021	Pocatello, ID	Idaho	14–0
44	November 19, 2022	Pocatello, ID	#21 Idaho	38–7
45	November 18, 2023	Moscow, ID	#6 Idaho	63–21
46	November 24, 2024	Pocatello, ID	#7 Idaho	40–17
47	November 22, 2025	Moscow, ID	Idaho State	37–16
48	November 21, 2026	Pocatello, ID	#25 Idaho State	19–5
Series: Idaho leads 33–15

^ Idaho State forfeited in 1978 due to transportation issues.

- Eight non-conference games: 1916, 1929, 1962, 1963, 1997, 1998, 2006, 2008; all won by Idaho
- Not played in 63 seasons: 1917–28, 1930–61, 1964, 1996, 1999–2005, 2007, 2009–17

=== Big Sky games ===
Both schools were charter members of the Big Sky Conference, which launched in 1963. In conference play, Idaho leads the series 25–15 (.625) through 2026. Idaho State was previously a member of the Rocky Mountain Athletic Conference. Idaho joined conference play for football in 1965, after six seasons (1959–1964) as an independent, preceded by several decades in the Pacific Coast Conference. They left the Big Sky in 1996 for Division I-A (FBS), then returned to FCS in 2018.

== Coaching records ==
Since first game in 1916

=== Idaho ===
Head coach	Games	Seasons	Wins	Losses	Ties	Pct.
Wilfred Bleamaster	1	1916–17	1	0	0	1.000
Leo Calland	1	1929–34	1	0	0	1.000
Dee Andros	2	1962–64	2	0	0	1.000
Steve Musseau	3	1965–67	3	0	0	1.000
Y C McNease	2	1968–69	1	1	0	.500
Don Robbins	4	1970–73	2	2	0	.500
Ed Troxel	4	1974–77	2	2	0	.500
Jerry Davitch	4	1978–81	2	2	0	.500
Dennis Erickson (a)	4	1982–85	2	2		.500
Keith Gilbertson	3	1986–88	2	1		.667
John L. Smith	6	1989–94	6	0		1.000
Chris Tormey	3	1995–99	2	1		.667
Dennis Erickson (b)	1	2006	1	0		1.000
Robb Akey	1	2007–12	1	0		1.000
Paul Petrino	4	2013–21	2	2		.500
Jason Eck	3	2022–24	3	0		1.000
Thomas Ford	2	2025–26	0	2		.000

=== Idaho State ===
Head Coach	Games	Seasons	Wins	Losses	Ties	Pct.
Reuben Bronson	1	1915–16	0	1	0	.000
Felix Plastino	1	1928–34	0	1	0	.000
Babe Caccia	3	1952–65	0	3	0	.000
Leo McKillip	2	1966–67	0	2	0	.000
Ed Cavanaugh	4	1968–71	2	2	0	.500
Bob Griffin	4	1972–75	2	2	0	.500
Joe Pascale	1	1976	0	1	0	.000
Bud Hake	3	1977–79	1	2	0	.333
Dave Kragthorpe	3	1980–82	2	1		.667
Jim Koetter	5	1983–87	3	2		.600
Garth Hall	4	1988–91	0	4		.000
Brian McNeely	4	1992–96	1	3		.250
Tom Walsh	2	1997–98	0	2		.000
Larry Lewis	1	1999–2006	0	1		.000
John Zamberlin	1	2007–10	0	1		.000
Rob Phenicie	4	2017–21	2	2		.500
Charlie Ragle	1	2022	0	1		.000
Cody Hawkins	4	2023–26	2	2		.500

== Miscellaneous ==
=== Locations ===
The rivalry game has been held in four different locations in two different states. Pocatello has held the most games with 25, followed by Moscow with 21, then Boise and Pullman, both with one.

State	City	Hosted
Washington	Pullman	1 (1969)
Idaho	Pocatello	25 (1916, 1929, 1963, 1966, 1968, 1970, 1972, 1974, 1976, 1979, 1982, 1983, 1985, 1987, 1989, 1991, 1993, 1995, 1997, 2018, 2021*, 2021, 2022, 2024, 2026)
Idaho	Moscow	21 (1962, 1965, 1971, 1973, 1975, 1977, 1978, 1980, 1981, 1984, 1986, 1988, 1990, 1992, 1994, 1998, 2006, 2008, 2019, 2023, 2025)
Idaho	Boise	1 (1967)

- The 1978 game in Moscow was not played due to ISU transportation problems; Idaho won by forfeit.
- Due to the COVID-19 pandemic, the 2000 season was delayed to spring 2021.

== See also ==
- List of NCAA college football rivalry games
