= List of Rocky Mountain Athletic Conference football champions =

This is a list of yearly Rocky Mountain Athletic Conference football champions.

== Champions by year ==
- 1909 Colorado
- 1910 Colorado College & Colorado
- 1911 Colorado
- 1912 Colorado Mines & Utah
- 1913 Colorado
- 1914 Colorado Mines
- 1915 Colorado Agricultural
- 1916 Colorado Agricultural
- 1917 Denver & Utah Agricultural
- 1918 Colorado Mines
- 1919 Colorado Agricultural
- 1920 Colorado Agricultural
- 1921 Utah Agricultural
- 1922 Utah
- 1923 Colorado
- 1924 Colorado
- 1925 Colorado Agricultural
- 1926 Utah
- 1927 Colorado Agricultural
- 1928 Utah
- 1929 Utah
- 1930 Utah
- 1931 Utah
- 1932 Utah
- 1933 Colorado Agricultural, Denver, & Utah
- 1934 Colorado, Colorado Agricultural, & Colorado Teachers
- 1935 Colorado & Utah State
- 1936 Utah State
- 1937 Colorado
- 1938 Montana State
- 1939 Colorado Mines
- 1940Colorado College
- 1941 Colorado College
- 1942 Colorado Mines
- 1943 No league play
- 1944 No league play
- 1945 Colorado College
- 1946 Montana State
- 1947 Montana State
- 1948 Colorado State–Greeley
- 1949 Colorado College
- 1950 Colorado College
- 1951 Colorado Mines
- 1952 Idaho State
- 1953 Idaho State
- 1954 Montana State
- 1955 Idaho State
- 1956 Montana State
- 1957 Idaho State
- 1958 Colorado College & Colorado Mines
- 1959 Idaho State
- 1960 Adams State
- 1961 Adams State
- 1962 Adams State
- 1963 Western State
- 1964 Western State
- 1965 Western State
- 1966 Western State
- 1967 Adams State
- 1968 Adams State
- 1969 Northern Colorado
- 1970 Pittsburg State
- 1971 Northern Colorado
- 1972 Adams State
- 1973 Western State
- 1974 Western State
- 1975 Western State
- 1976 Western State
- 1977 Western State
- 1978 Western State
- 1979 Western State
- 1980 Adams State & CSU Pueblo
- 1981 N.M. Highlands
- 1982 Mesa State
- 1983 Mesa State
- 1984 Fort Lewis
- 1985 Mesa State
- 1986 Mesa State
- 1987 Mesa State
- 1988 Mesa State
- 1989 Adams State
- 1990 Mesa State
- 1991 Western State
- 1992 Western State
- 1993 Fort Hays State
- 1994 Western State
- 1995 Fort Hays State & Western State
- 1996 Chadron State
- 1997 Western State
- 1998 Chadron State & Western State
- 1999 Chadron State & N.M. Highlands
- 2000 Mesa State
- 2001 Chadron State
- 2002 Chadron State & Nebraska-Kearney
- 2003 Mesa State
- 2004 Colorado Mines
- 2005 Nebraska-Kearney
- 2006 Chadron State
- 2007 Chadron State
- 2008 Chadron State
- 2009 Nebraska-Kearney
- 2010 Colorado Mines & Nebraska-Kearney
- 2011 CSU Pueblo
- 2012 CSU Pueblo
- 2013 CSU Pueblo
- 2014 CSU Pueblo & Colorado Mines
- 2015 Colorado Mesa †
- 2016 Colorado Mesa, Colorado Mines & CSU Pueblo
- 2017 Colorado Mesa & CSU Pueblo
- 2018 Colorado Mines & CSU Pueblo
- 2019 Colorado Mines
- 2020 None
- 2021 Colorado Mines & Western Colorado
- 2022 Colorado Mines
- 2023 Colorado Mines
- 2024 CSU Pueblo
- 2025 CSU Pueblo

† Colorado Mesa declared champion due to CSU–Pueblo's use of academically ineligible players.
