= 1952 Montana State Bobcats football team =

American college football season

1952 Montana State Bobcats football
- Conference: Rocky Mountain Conference
- Record: 2–5 (1–4 RMC)
- Head coach: Tony Storti (1st season)
- Home stadium: Gatton Field

1952 Rocky Mountain Conference football standings
	Conf.					Overall
Team	W		L		T	W		L		T
Idaho State $	5	–	0	–	0	8	–	0	–	0
Colorado College	4	–	1	–	0	7	–	2	–	0
Colorado State–Greeley	3	–	2	–	0	5	–	3	–	0
Colorado Mines	2	–	3	–	0	4	–	5	–	0
Montana State	1	–	4	–	0	2	–	5	–	0
Western State (CO)	0	–	5	–	0	2	–	6	–	0
$ – Conference champion

The 1952 Montana State Bobcats football team was an American football team that represented Montana State University in the Rocky Mountain Conference (RMC) during the 1952 college football season. In its first season under head coach Tony Storti, the team compiled a 2–5 record (1–4 against conference opponents) and finished fifth out of six teams in the RMC.

== Schedule ==
Date	Opponent	Site	Result	Attendance	Source
October 4	Eastern Washington*	Gatton Field; Bozeman, MT	W 16–6		
October 11	at Colorado State–Greeley	Jackson Field; Greeley, CO	L 0–47		
October 18	Colorado College^{†}	Gatton Field; Bozeman, MT	L 12–40		
October 25	Western State (CO)	Gatton Field; Bozeman, MT	W 16–12		
November 1	at Montana*	Dornblaser Field; Missoula, MT (rivalry)	L 12–35		
November 8	at Idaho State	Spud Bowl; Pocatello, ID	L 12–35	4,500	
November 22	at Colorado Mines	Brooks Field; Golden, CO	L 19–35		
*Non-conference game; ^{†}Homecoming
