= Plastino =

Plastino is an Italian surname. Notable people with the surname include:

- Al Plastino (1921–2013), American comics artist
- Felix Plastino (1895–1957), American player and coach of college football
- Nick Plastino (born 1986), Canadian-born Italian ice hockey player
