= 1953 Montana State Bobcats football team =

American college football season

1953 Montana State Bobcats football
- Conference: Rocky Mountain Conference
- Record: 4–4 (4–1 RMC)
- Head coach: Tony Storti (2nd season)
- Home stadium: Gatton Field

1953 Rocky Mountain Conference football standings
	Conf.					Overall
Team	W		L		T	W		L		T
Idaho State $	5	–	0	–	0	6	–	2	–	0
Montana State	4	–	1	–	0	4	–	4	–	0
Western State (CO)	2	–	2	–	1	5	–	2	–	1
Colorado College	1	–	2	–	2	2	–	4	–	2
Colorado Mines	1	–	3	–	1	3	–	4	–	1
Colorado State–Greeley	0	–	5	–	0	2	–	5	–	0
$ – Conference champion

The 1953 Montana State Bobcats football team was an American football team that represented Montana State University in the Rocky Mountain Conference (RMC) during the 1953 college football season. In its second season under head coach Tony Storti, the team compiled a 4–4 record (4–1 against conference opponents) and finished second out of six teams in the RMC.

== Schedule ==
Date	Opponent	Site	Result	Attendance	Source
September 19	College of Idaho*	Gatton Field; Bozeman, MT	L 26–38		
September 26	at Colorado Mines	Brooks Field; Golden, CO	W 25–7		
October 3	Western State (CO)*	Gatton Field; Bozeman, MT	W 14–13		
October 10	Colorado State–Greeley^{†}	Gatton Field; Bozeman, MT	W 26–0		
October 17	at Colorado College	Washburn Field; Colorado Springs, CO	W 20–0		
October 24	at North Dakota*	Memorial Stadium; Grand Forks, ND	L 7–14		
October 31	Idaho State	Gatton Field; Bozeman, MT	L 0–13		
November 7	Montana*	Gatton Field; Bozeman, MT (rivalry)	L 13–32	6,147	
*Non-conference game; ^{†}Homecoming
