= 1956 Idaho State Bengals football team =

American college football season

1956 Idaho State Bengals football
- Conference: Rocky Mountain Conference
- Record: 6–3 (3–2 RMC)
- Head coach: Babe Caccia (5th season)
- Home stadium: Spud Bowl

1956 Rocky Mountain Conference football standings
	Conf.					Overall
Team	W		L		T	W		L		T
Montana State $^	5	–	0	–	0	9	–	0	–	1
Idaho State	3	–	2	–	0	6	–	3	–	0
Colorado State–Greeley	3	–	2	–	0	5	–	4	–	0
Western State (CO)	3	–	2	–	0	5	–	5	–	0
Colorado College	1	–	4	–	0	2	–	7	–	0
Colorado Mines	0	–	5	–	0	2	–	7	–	0
$ – Conference champion; ^ – NAIA playoff participant

The 1956 Idaho State Bengals football team was an American football team that represented Idaho State College (now known as Idaho State University) as a member of the Rocky Mountain Conference (RMC) during the 1956 college football season. In their fifth season under head coach Babe Caccia, the Bengals compiled a 6–3 record, with a mark of 3–2 in conference play, and finished tied for second in the RMC.

== Schedule ==
Date	Opponent	Site	Result	Attendance	Source
September 22	Nevada*	Spud Bowl; Pocatello, ID	W 20–6		
September 29	San Diego NAS*	Spud Bowl; Pocatello, ID	W 19–12	5,000	
October 6	at Western State (CO)	Gunnison, CO	L 13–14		
October 13	Omaha*	Spud Bowl; Pocatello, ID	L 0–9		
October 20	at Montana State	Gatton Field; Bozeman, MT	L 6–26		
October 27	Colorado College	Spud Bowl; Pocatello, ID	W 32–0		
November 3	at Colorado Mines	Brooks Field; Golden, CO	W 27–6		
November 10	Colorado State–Greeley	Spud Bowl; Pocatello, ID	W 20–7		
November 17	vs. Air Force*	Pueblo, CO	W 13–7		
*Non-conference game
