= John Vesser =

American college athletics player and coach

- Vesser, c. 1942

Biographical details
- Born: October 1, 1900; Coeur d'Alene, Idaho, U.S.
- Died: March 20, 1996 (aged 95); Pocatello, Idaho, U.S.

Playing career

Football
- 1922–1925: Idaho
- 1926: Los Angeles Wildcats
- 1927: Chicago Cardinals
- 1930–1931: Chicago Cardinals
- Position: End

Coaching career (HC unless noted)

Football
- 1934–1936: Lewiston HS (ID)
- 1937–1940: Idaho Southern Branch (assistant)
- 1941–1951: Idaho Southern Branch / Idaho State

Basketball
- 1944–1946: Idaho Southern Branch / Idaho State
- 1947–1948: Idaho State

Administrative career (AD unless noted)
- 1952–1965: Idaho State

Head coaching record
- Overall: 41–27–6 (college football)

Accomplishments and honors

Awards
- First-team All-PCC (1924)

John Martin Vesser (October 1, 1900 – March 20, 1996) was an American football player, coach of football and basketball, and college athletics administrator. He served as the head football coach at Idaho State University for nine seasons, from 1941 to 1951.

== Biography ==
Vesser was born in 1900 in Coeur d'Alene, Idaho. He played college football for Idaho, and was on the West squad for the inaugural East–West Shrine Game in December 1925. Vesser then played professionally for the Los Angeles Wildcats and the Chicago Cardinals.

Following his playing career, Vesser became a coach, first at the high school level, then joined the Idaho Southern Branch Bengals football team as an assistant coach in 1937. In 1941, Vesser succeeded Guy Wicks as head coach; the school was renamed as Idaho State College in 1947. Vesser spent 11 years as head coach, during which the team competed in nine football seasons, as no teams were fielded in 1943 or 1945 due to World War II, compiling an overall record of 41–27–6 (.595).

Vesser also served as head coach of the Idaho State Bengals men's basketball team for several seasons, and was athletic director at the college from 1952 to 1965. He was inducted to the North Idaho Athletic Hall of Fame in 1974, and the athletics hall of fame at Idaho State in 1979. Vesser died in 1996 in Pocatello, Idaho.

== Head coaching record ==
=== College football ===
Year	Team	Overall	Conference	Standing	Bowl/playoffs
Idaho Southern Branch / State Bengals (Independent) (1941–1949)
1941	Idaho Southern Branch	5–1–2			
1942	Idaho Southern Branch	4–2			
1943	No team—World War II				
1944	Idaho Southern Branch	4–5			
1945	No team—World War II				
1946	Idaho Southern Branch	4–3–1			
1947	Idaho State	3–5–1			
1948	Idaho State	6–1–1			
1949	Idaho State	6–2–1			
Idaho State Bengals (Rocky Mountain Conference) (1950–1951)
1950	Idaho State	4–4	3–2	T–2nd	
1951	Idaho State	5–4	3–2	T–2nd	
Idaho Southern Branch / Idaho State:		41–27–6	6–4		
Total:		41–27–6			
