= Hubert Upjohn =

American football coach

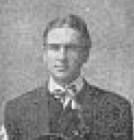
- Upjohn, circa 1906

Biographical details
- Born: January 4, 1881; Kalamazoo, Michigan, U.S.
- Died: March 19, 1965 (aged 84); Monterey, California, U.S.
- Education: Kalamazoo (1903); Chicago (Ph.B., 1904)

Coaching career (HC unless noted)
- 1905–1906: Academy of Idaho

Head coaching record
- Overall: 3–2–3

Hubert Standard Upjohn (January 4, 1881 – March 19, 1965) was an American college football coach. He served as the head football coach at the Academy of Idaho—now known as Idaho State University–from 1905 to 1906, compiling a record of 3–2–3. Upjohn was a 1903 graduate of Kalamazoo College and a 1904 graduate of the University of Chicago.

== Head coaching record ==
| Year | Team | Overall | Conference | Standing | Bowl/playoffs |
|---|---|---|---|---|---|
Academy of Idaho Bantams (Independent) (1905–1906)
| 1905 | Academy of Idaho | 3–0–2 | | | |
| 1906 | Academy of Idaho | 0–2–1 | | | |
| Academy of Idaho: | | 3–2–3 | | | |
| Total: | | 3–2–3 | | | |
