= Herbert Cheney =

American football coach and educator

Biographical details
- Born: June 6, 1873; Barnstable, Massachusetts, U.S.
- Died: January 13, 1931 (aged 57); Tacoma, Washington, U.S.
- Education: Ohio Wesleyan (AB, 1895); Harvard (AM, 1899)

Coaching career (HC unless noted)
- 1902–1903: Idaho State

Head coaching record
- Overall: 5–1–1

Herbert Denison Cheney (Note: Online records for Idaho State University spell his surname both as Cheney and Chaney.) (June 6, 1873 – January 13, 1931) was an American football coach and educator. He served as the head football coach at the Academy of Idaho—now known as Idaho State University–from 1902 to 1903, compiling a record of 5–1–1.

Cheney was an 1895 graduate of Ohio Wesleyan University and earned his master's degree in ancient and modern languages from Harvard University in 1899. As of September 1918, Cheney was teaching at Gooding College and living in Gooding, Idaho, with his wife, Edna. He had two daughters and two sons. Cheney died on January 13, 1931, after being struck by an automobile in Tacoma, Washington, while on his way to teach night classes at the College of Puget Sound.

== Head coaching record ==
Year	Team	Overall	Conference	Standing	Bowl/playoffs
Academy of Idaho Bantams (Independent) (1902–1903)
1902	Academy of Idaho	5–0			
1903	Academy of Idaho	0–1–1			
Academy of Idaho:		5–1–1			
Total:		5–1–1			
