= Charlie Ragle =

American football player and coach (born 1976)

Biographical details
- Born: May 30, 1976 (age 50); Playas, New Mexico, U.S.

Playing career
- 1994–1997: Eastern New Mexico
- Position: Running back

Coaching career (HC unless noted)
- 2000–2004: Moon Valley HS (AZ) (DC)
- 2005: Chaparral HS (AZ) (DC)
- 2006: Arizona State (GA)
- 2007–2011: Chaparral HS (AZ)
- 2012: Arizona (assistant DFO)
- 2013–2016: Arizona (STC/TE)
- 2017–2018: California (STC/TE)
- 2019–2021: California (STC)
- 2022: Idaho State
- 2023–2025: Arizona State (AHC/STC)

Head coaching record
- Overall: 63–7 (high school); 1–10 (college)

Charlie Ragle (born May 30, 1976) is an American football coach and former player. Most recently, he was the assistant head coach and special teams coordinator at Arizona State University, a position he held from 2023-2025. Ragle served as the head football coach at Idaho State University in 2022. He was previously the special teams coordinator at University of California, Berkeley and the University of Arizona. Prior to joining the college coaching ranks, Ragle had a successful run as a High school football coach in Arizona.

== Playing career ==
Born in Playas, New Mexico, Ragle was a two-time all-state selection at running back for Animas High School in New Mexico and played college football at Eastern New Mexico University in Portales. He was a three-year starter at running back for the Division II Greyhounds, and also returned kicks.

== Coaching career ==
=== High school ===
From 2000 to 2004, Ragle served as the defensive coordinator at Moon Valley High School in Phoenix, Arizona. Moon Valley made the state playoffs in the final three years, and in 2004, they finished with a 14–0 record as state champions. In early 2005 Ragle and offensive coordinator Dave Huffine departed Moon Valley to join Ron Estabrook's staff at powerhouse Chaparral High School in Scottsdale, Arizona.

After a stop as a graduate assistant for Arizona State in 2006 under Dirk Koetter, Ragle returned to the high school ranks as the head coach at Chaparral, following Estabrook's retirement. In five seasons, from 2007 to 2011, Ragle led his team to a 63–7 overall record, and won state championships in his final three seasons. Among his players at Chaparral was future NFL Pro Bowl offensive tackle Taylor Lewan. Lewan would be recruited by then-University of Michigan head coach Rich Rodriguez, and Rodriguez and Ragle became acquainted.

=== Arizona ===
Rodriguez hired Ragle prior to the 2012 season to serve as Arizona's assistant director of operations. He was promoted to special teams coordinator and tight ends coach in December 2012, a position he held through 2016 season.

=== California ===
Prior to the 2017 season, Ragle was hired by head coach Justin Wilcox as the special teams coordinator and tight ends coach at California. In 2019, he began to focus solely on special teams, and stayed in Berkeley through 2021.

=== Idaho State ===
In December 2021, Ragle was hired to succeed Rob Phenicie as the head coach at Idaho State University in the Big Sky Conference. It was his first opportunity as a collegiate head coach. Following a frustrating 1–10 first season in Pocatello, Ragle resigned in late November to join the staff at Arizona State.

=== Arizona State ===
Following the 2022 season, Ragle joined Kenny Dillingham's inaugural staff at Arizona State; he had coached Dillingham in high school. Ragle will serve as the assistant head coach and special teams coordinator.

== Personal life ==
Ragle graduated from Eastern New Mexico University in 1998 with a degree in physical education, with a minor in history. He and his wife, Carrie, have a daughter, Caylee, and a son, Chas.

== Head coaching record ==
Year	Team	Overall	Conference	Standing	Bowl/playoffs
Idaho State Bengals (Big Sky Conference) (2022)
2022	Idaho State	1–10	1–7	T–11th	
Idaho State:		1–10	1–7		
Total:		1–10			
