= Jim Koetter =

American football coach (1937–2025)

Biographical details
- Born: December 11, 1937; McCook, Nebraska, U.S.
- Died: February 18, 2025 (aged 87)

Playing career
- 1958–1959: Idaho State
- Position: End

Coaching career (HC unless noted)
- 1961–1962: Aberdeen HS (ID)
- 1963–1964: Highland HS (ID) (assistant)
- 1965–1979: Highland HS (ID)
- 1980–1982: Idaho State (assistant)
- 1983–1987: Idaho State

Head coaching record
- Overall: 23–32–1 (college)

James Joseph Koetter (December 11, 1937 – February 18, 2025) was an American football coach. He was the head coach of the Idaho State Bengals football team from 1983 to 1987.

== Biography ==
A native of McCook, Nebraska, Koetter played college football at McCook Junior College (which later merged into Mid-Plains Community College), then transferred to Idaho State University (ISU) in Pocatello, Idaho, where he played as an end in 1958 and 1959, and earned a bachelor's degree in 1961.

Remaining in eastern Idaho, Koetter was the head coach at Aberdeen High School for two years before joining the coaching staff as an assistant coach at Highland High School in Pocatello in 1963. He succeeded Ron Anderson as head coach two years later and led the Rams for 15 seasons with a record of 102–49–2 (.673). Koetter was also an assistant basketball coach and track coach at Highland.

Koetter became an assistant at his alma mater ISU in 1980 under new head coach Dave Kragthorpe, and the next year the Bengals won the national title in Division I-AA. When Kragthorpe left ISU in June 1983, Koetter was promoted to head coach; he led the Bengals for five seasons, compiling a record of 23–32–1 (.420).

After his tenure at ISU, Koetter returned to high school coaching at Pocatello High School.

Koetter was a 1985 inductee of the Idaho State athletic hall of fame, in both football and track and field. He was the father of Dirk Koetter, who has coached in the National Football League (NFL) including a tenure as head coach of the Tampa Bay Buccaneers.

Koetter died on February 18, 2025, at the age of 87.

== Head coaching record ==
=== College ===
Year	Team	Overall	Conference	Standing	Bowl/playoffs	NCAA^{#}
Idaho State Bengals (Big Sky Conference) (1983–1987)
1983	Idaho State	8–4	5–2	2nd	L NCAA Division I-AA First Round	12
1984	Idaho State	5–6	4–3	T–3rd		
1985	Idaho State	5–6	3–4	5th		
1986	Idaho State	2–9	1–7	8th		
1987	Idaho State	3–7–1	3–5	7th		
Idaho State:		23–32–1	16–21			
Total:		23–32–1				
