= 1957 Idaho State Bengals football team =

American college football season

1957 Idaho State Bengals football

RMC champion
- Conference: Rocky Mountain Conference
- Record: 9–0 (5–0 RMC)
- Head coach: Babe Caccia (6th season)
- Captains: Jim Wagstaff; Ken Peterson
- Home stadium: Spud Bowl

1957 Rocky Mountain Conference football standings
	Conf.					Overall
Team	W		L		T	W		L		T
Idaho State $	5	–	0	–	0	9	–	0	–	0
Western State (CO)	3	–	1	–	1	5	–	4	–	1
Colorado State–Greeley	3	–	2	–	0	6	–	3	–	0
Colorado College	2	–	3	–	0	3	–	5	–	0
Colorado Mines	0	–	3	–	2	0	–	6	–	3
Adams State	0	–	4	–	1	0	–	9	–	1
$ – Conference champion

The 1957 Idaho State Bengals football team was an American football team that represented Idaho State University as a member of the Rocky Mountain Conference (RMC) during the 1957 college football season. their sixth season under head coach Babe Caccia, the Bengals compiled a perfect 9–0 record, won the RMC championship, and outscored opponents by a total of 280 to 85. The team captains were Jim Wagstaff and Ken Peterson.

== Schedule ==
Date	Opponent	Site	Result	Attendance	Source
September 21	Hastings*	Spud Bowl; Pocatello, ID	W 22–0	3,500	
September 28	at Nevada*	Mackay Field; Reno, NV	W 40–6		
October 5	Western State (CO)	Spud Bowl; Pocatello, ID	W 41–13		
October 19	Montana State*^{†}	Spud Bowl; Pocatello, ID	W 26–13	5,000	
October 26	at Colorado College	Washburn Field; Colorado Springs, CO	W 34–7	2,000	
November 2	Colorado Mines	Spud Bowl; Pocatello, ID	W 34–7	1,500	
November 9	at Colorado State–Greeley	Jackson Field; Greeley, CO	W 7–6	1,500	
November 11	at Adams State	Alamosa, CO	W 42–12		
November 23	vs. College of Idaho*	Lincoln Field; Twin Falls, ID	W 34–21	3,500	
*Non-conference game; ^{†}Homecoming

== After the season ==
The following Bengal was selected in the 1958 NFL draft after the season.

Round	Pick	Player	Position	NFL club
21	253	Jim Wagstaff	Back	Detroit Lions
