= 1952 Idaho State Bengals football team =

American college football season

1952 Idaho State Bengals football

RMC champion
- Conference: Rocky Mountain Conference
- Record: 8–0 (5–0 RMC)
- Head coach: Babe Caccia (1st season)
- Captains: Chet Lee; Lamont Jones
- Home stadium: Spud Bowl

1952 Rocky Mountain Conference football standings
	Conf.					Overall
Team	W		L		T	W		L		T
Idaho State $	5	–	0	–	0	8	–	0	–	0
Colorado College	4	–	1	–	0	7	–	2	–	0
Colorado State–Greeley	3	–	2	–	0	5	–	3	–	0
Colorado Mines	2	–	3	–	0	4	–	5	–	0
Montana State	1	–	4	–	0	2	–	5	–	0
Western State (CO)	0	–	5	–	0	2	–	6	–	0
$ – Conference champion

The 1952 Idaho State Bengals football team was an American football team that represented Idaho State University as a member of the Rocky Mountain Conference (RMC) during the 1952 college football season. In their first season under head coach Babe Caccia, the Bengals compiled a perfect 8–0 record, won the RMC championship, and outscored opponents by a total of 233 to 85. The team captains were Chet Lee and Lamont Jones.

== Schedule ==
Date	Opponent	Site	Result	Attendance	Source
September 20	College of Idaho*	Spud Bowl; Pocatello, ID	W 20–7	4,400	
September 27	Western State (CO)	Spud Bowl; Pocatello, ID	W 40–0	3,000	
October 4	at Colorado College	Washburn Field; Colorado Springs, CO	W 17–6		
October 18	Colorado State–Greeley^{†}	Spud Bowl; Pocatello, ID	W 46–16	5,000	
October 25	Nevada*	Spud Bowl; Pocatello, ID	W 33–13	3,000	
November 1	at Colorado Mines	Golden, CO	W 21–13		
November 8	Montana State	Spud Bowl; Pocatello, ID	W 35–12	4,500	
November 15	at Lewis & Clark*	Multnomah Stadium; Portland, OR	W 21–18		
*Non-conference game; ^{†}Homecoming
