= Leo McKillip =

American gridiron football player, coach, and administrator (1929–2013)

Biographical details
- Born: January 26, 1929
- Died: December 24, 2013 (aged 84); Omaha, Nebraska, U.S.

Playing career
- 1948–1950: Notre Dame
- Position: Halfback

Coaching career (HC unless noted)
- 1954: Kimball HS (NE)
- 1955–1965: Idaho State (backfield)
- 1966–1967: Idaho State
- 1970–1973: Saint Mary's
- 1974–1977: Edmonton Eskimos (assistant)
- 1978–1979: Winnipeg Blue Bombers (LB/DB)
- 1980–1982: Winnipeg Blue Bombers (DC)
- 1983–1984: Washington Federals (DC)
- 1985–1992: Dana

Administrative career (AD unless noted)
- 1986–1993: Dana

Head coaching record
- Overall: 51–75–2 (college)
- Tournaments: 0–1 (NAIA D-II playoffs)

Accomplishments and honors

Championships
- National (1949)

William "Leo" McKillip (January 26, 1929 – December 24, 2013) was an American football coach and college athletics administrator. He served as the head football coach at Idaho State University from 1966 to 1967, Saint Mary's College of California from 1970 to 1973, and Dana College in Blair, Nebraska, from 1985 to 1992. McKillip was also the athletic director at Dana from 1986 to 1993.

McKillip died at age 84 in 2013 in Omaha, Nebraska.

== Head coaching record ==
=== College ===
Year	Team	Overall	Conference	Standing	Bowl/playoffs
Idaho State Bengals (Big Sky Conference) (1966–1967)
1966	Idaho State	3–6	1–3	4th	
1967	Idaho State	1–9	0–4	5th	
Idaho State:		4–15	1–7		
Saint Mary's Gaels (NCAA College Division / Division III independent) (1970–1973)
1970	Saint Mary's	3–4			
1971	Saint Mary's	3–5			
1972	Saint Mary's	3–4			
1973	Saint Mary's	3–4–1			
Saint Mary's:		12–17–1			
Dana Vikings (Nebraska Intercollegiate Athletic Conference / Nebraska-Iowa Athletic Conference) (1985–1992)
1985	Dana	1–8	0–5	6th	
1986	Dana	6–4	3–2	T–2nd	
1987	Dana	8–3	3–2	T–2nd	L NAIA Division II First Round
1988	Dana	6–4	3–2	T–2nd	
1989	Dana	6–4	2–3	T–4th	
1990	Dana	3–6–1	1–3–1	5th	
1991	Dana	3–6	1–4	T–5th	
1992	Dana	2–8	0–6	7th	
Dana:		35–43–1	13–27–1		
Total:		51–75–2			
