= Bob Griffin (American football coach) =

American football player and coach (born 1940)

Biographical details
- Born: October 22, 1940 (age 86); New Haven, Connecticut, U.S.

Playing career
- 1958: Delaware
- 1961-1962: Southern Connecticut
- Position: Quarterback

Coaching career (HC unless noted)
- 1963–1965: Holy Cross HS (NY)
- 1966–1969: Rhode Island (assistant)
- 1970: Bishop Hendricken HS (RI)
- 1971: Idaho State (OC)
- 1972–1975: Idaho State
- 1976–1992: Rhode Island
- 1993–1995: Berlin Adler
- 1995–1998: Syracuse (WR)
- 2000–2003: Holy Cross (QB)
- 2004–2005: Holy Cross (co-OC)
- 2008–2011: Rhode Island (TE)

Head coaching record
- Overall: 100–127–1 (college)
- Tournaments: 2–3 (NCAA D-I-AA playoffs)

Accomplishments and honors

Championships
- 3 Yankee (1981, 1984–1985)

Robert S. Griffin (born October 22, 1940) is an American former football coach. He served as the head football coach at Idaho State University from 1972 to 1975 and the University of Rhode Island from 1976 to 1992, compiling a career college football coaching record of 100–127–1. His 79 wins with the Rhode Island Rams are the most of any head coach in program history. Griffin was born and raised in Milford, Connecticut and graduated from Southern Connecticut State College in 1963. He played college football at Southern Connecticut State as a quarterback and holds the team record for longest completed pass (87 yards).

== Coaching career ==
Griffin began his coaching career at Holy Cross High School in Queens, NY, leading the team to their first New York City Championship in 1963 and a second New York City Championship in 1965. Griffin worked as an assistant coach at URI from 1966 to 1970. He next was offensive coordinator at Idaho State, and was named head coach in 1972. Griffin returned to URI in 1976 and spent 17 seasons as the Rams' head coach.

On November 25, 1992, Griffin was fired from his post at Rhode Island. In the 20 years following Griffin's termination, the school's football team had two winning seasons under four different head coaches.

== Personal life ==
Griffin has three children and seven grandchildren. He currently resides in Narragansett, Rhode Island with his wife, Rosanne.

== Head coaching record ==
Year	Team	Overall	Conference	Standing	Bowl/playoffs
Idaho State Bengals (Big Sky Conference) (1972–1975)
1972	Idaho State	7–3	4–2	2nd	
1973	Idaho State	2–9	0–6	7th	
1974	Idaho State	5–5	2–4	6th	
1975	Idaho State	7–3	4–2	T–2nd	
Idaho State:		21–20	10–14		
Rhode Island Rams (Yankee Conference) (1976–1992)
1976	Rhode Island	3–5	2–3	T–3rd	
1977	Rhode Island	6–5	4–1	2nd	
1978	Rhode Island	7–3	3–2	T–2nd	
1979	Rhode Island	1–9–1	1–4	5th	
1980	Rhode Island	2–9	0–5	6th	
1981	Rhode Island	6–6	4–1	T–1st	L NCAA Division I-AA First Round
1982	Rhode Island	7–4	2–3	5th	
1983	Rhode Island	6–4	2–3	T–4th	
1984	Rhode Island	10–3	4–1	T–1st	L NCAA Division I-AA SemiFinal
1985	Rhode Island	10–3	5–0	1st	L NCAA Division I-AA Quarter-Final
1986	Rhode Island	1–10	0–7	8th	
1987	Rhode Island	1–10	1–6	8th	
1988	Rhode Island	4–7	3–5	T–7th	
1989	Rhode Island	3–8	1–7	8th	
1990	Rhode Island	5–6	2–6	T–7th	
1991	Rhode Island	6–5	3–5	T–4th	
1992	Rhode Island	1–10	0–8	9th	
Rhode Island:		79–107–1	37–67		
Total:		100–127–1			
National championship Conference title Conference division title or championship game berth
