= Joe Pascale =

American football player and coach (1946–2021)

Biographical details
- Born: April 17, 1946; New York, New York, U.S.
- Died: March 28, 2021 (aged 74); Hyannis, Massachusetts, U.S.

Playing career
- 1963–1966: Connecticut
- Positions: Linebacker, nose guard

Coaching career (HC unless noted)
- 1967–1969: Connecticut (assistant)
- 1970–1973: Rhode Island (assistant)
- 1974–1975: Idaho State (DC)
- 1976: Idaho State
- 1977: Princeton (DL/LB)
- 1978–1979: Princeton (DC)
- 1980–1981: Montreal Alouettes (DL)
- 1982–1983: Ottawa Rough Riders (assistant)
- 1984–1985: New Jersey Generals (assistant)
- 1986–1989: St. Louis/Phoenix Cardinals (DC)
- 1990: Phoenix Cardinals (LB)
- 1991–1993: Phoenix Cardinals (OLB)
- 1994–1996: Cincinnati Bengals (LB)
- 1997–2001: San Diego Chargers (DC)
- 2002: San Diego Chargers (special projects)

Head coaching record
- Overall: 1–9

Joseph Vincent Pascale (April 17, 1946 – March 28, 2021) was an American football player and coach. He served as the head coach at Idaho State University in 1976, compiling a record of 1–9. Pascale later worked as a defensive assistant in the National Football League (NFL) for the Phoenix Cardinals, Cincinnati Bengals, and San Diego Chargers.

== Head coaching record ==
Year	Team	Overall	Conference	Standing	Bowl/playoffs
Idaho State Bengals (Big Sky Conference) (1976)
1976	Idaho State	1–9	0–6	7th	
Idaho State:		1–9	0–6		
Total:		1–9			
