= 1959 Idaho State Bengals football team =

American college football season

1959 Idaho State Bengals football

RMC champion
- Conference: Rocky Mountain Conference
- Record: 6–2 (4–0 RMC)
- Head coach: Babe Caccia (8th season)
- Captains: Paul Tripp; Ray Konczos
- Home stadium: Spud Bowl

1959 Rocky Mountain Conference football standings
	Conf.					Overall
Team	W		L		T	W		L		T
Idaho State $	3	–	0	–	0	6	–	2	–	0
Adams State	3	–	1	–	0	8	–	1	–	0
Colorado State–Greeley	3	–	2	–	0	7	–	2	–	0
Colorado College	2	–	3	–	0	4	–	4	–	0
Colorado Mines	1	–	3	–	0	4	–	6	–	0
Western State (CO)	1	–	4	–	0	3	–	5	–	0
$ – Conference champion

The 1959 Idaho State Bengals football team was an American football team that represented Idaho State College (now known as Idaho State University) as a member of the Rocky Mountain Conference (RMC) during the 1959 college football season. In their eighth season under head coach Babe Caccia, the Bengals compiled a 6–2 record (4–0 against conference opponents), won the RMC championship, and outscored opponents by a total of 160 to 79. The team captains were Paul Tripp and Ray Konczos.

== Schedule ==
Date	Time	Opponent	Site	Result	Attendance	Source
September 19		Arizona State–Flagstaff*	Spud Bowl; Pocatello, ID	L 7–16	3,400	
September 26		Hawaii*	Spud Bowl; Pocatello, ID	L 8–14	5,000	
October 3	8:00 p.m.	vs. Western State (CO)	Jaycee Park; Twin Falls, ID	W 32–7	1,800–2,000	
October 10		at Omaha*	Omaha Municipal Stadium; Omaha, NE	W 33–0	2,573	
October 17		No. 4 Montana State^{†}	Spud Bowl; Pocatello, ID	W 6–0	5,500	
October 24		at Colorado College	Washburn Field; Colorado Springs, CO	W 14–8		
October 31		College of Idaho*	Spud Bowl; Pocatello, ID	W 28–21		
November 7		at Colorado State–Greeley	Jackson Field; Greeley, CO	W 32–13		
*Non-conference game; ^{†}Homecoming; Rankings from UPI Poll released prior to the game; All times are in Central time
