= Larry Lewis =

American football player and coach (born 1957)

Biographical details
- Born: October 30, 1957 (age 68); Vale, Oregon, U.S.

Playing career
- 1977–1980: Boise State
- Position: Linebacker

Coaching career (HC unless noted)
- 1981–1985: Weber State (OLB)
- 1986–1988: Weber State (DL)
- 1989–1994: Washington State (DE)
- 1995–1998: Washington State (AHC/ST)
- 1999–2006: Idaho State
- 2008–2010: Colorado State (ST/S)
- 2011: Colorado State (AHC/ST/RB)
- 2012–2013: Nevada (ST/RB)
- 2013–2015: Virginia (ST/RB)
- 2017–2021: Penn State (analyst)

Head coaching record
- Overall: 40–49

Accomplishments and honors

Championships
- 1 Big Sky (2002)

Larry Lewis (born October 30, 1957) is a college football coach and former player. Previously Lewis served as the head football coach at Idaho State and as an assistant coach at Weber State, Washington State and Colorado State. Lewis also played linebacker at Boise State from 1977 through 1980 and was a member of the Broncos' national championship team in 1980.

Lewis was hired by Idaho State on November 23, 1998, to serve as their head coach after he served as an assistant for Mike Price for 18 years at both Weber State and Washington State. During his tenure as the Bengals' head coach, he led the team to an overall record of 40 wins and 49 losses (40–49) and to a co-Big Sky Conference championship in 2002. Lewis was fired from Idaho State, along with his entire staff, on November 20, 2006, after they won only two games during the season.

== Head coaching record ==
Year	Team	Overall	Conference	Standing	Bowl/playoffs
Idaho State Bengals (Big Sky Conference) (1999–2006)
1999	Idaho State	4–7	2–6	T–7th	
2000	Idaho State	6–5	4–4	6th	
2001	Idaho State	4–7	1–6	T–7th	
2002	Idaho State	8–3	5–2	T–1st	
2003	Idaho State	8–4	4–3	T–4th	
2004	Idaho State	3–8	2–5	T–6th	
2005	Idaho State	5–6	3–4	6th	
2006	Idaho State	2–9	1–7	8th	
Idaho State:		40–49	22–37		
Total:		40–49			
National championship Conference title Conference division title or championship game berth
