= 1953 Idaho State Bengals football team =

American college football season

1953 Idaho State Bengals football

RMC champion
- Conference: Rocky Mountain Conference
- Record: 6–2 (5–0 RMC)
- Head coach: Babe Caccia (2nd season)
- Captains: Nolan Ford; Vernon Ravsten
- Home stadium: Spud Bowl

1953 Rocky Mountain Conference football standings
	Conf.					Overall
Team	W		L		T	W		L		T
Idaho State $	5	–	0	–	0	6	–	2	–	0
Montana State	4	–	1	–	0	4	–	4	–	0
Western State (CO)	2	–	2	–	1	5	–	2	–	1
Colorado College	1	–	2	–	2	2	–	4	–	2
Colorado Mines	1	–	3	–	1	3	–	4	–	1
Colorado State–Greeley	0	–	5	–	0	2	–	5	–	0
$ – Conference champion

The 1953 Idaho State Bengals football team was an American football team that represented Idaho State University as a member of the Rocky Mountain Conference (RMC) during the 1953 college football season. In their second season under head coach Babe Caccia, the Bengals compiled a 6–2 record (5–0 against conference opponents), won the RMC championship, and outscored opponents by a total of 165 to 141. The team captains were Nolan Ford and Vernon Ravsten.

== Schedule ==
Date	Opponent	Site	Result	Attendance	Source
September 19	Eastern Washington*	Spud Bowl; Pocatello, ID	L 6–14		
October 3	Colorado College	Spud Bowl; Pocatello, ID	W 27–20		
October 10	Colorado Mines^{†}	Spud Bowl; Pocatello, ID	W 33–21		
October 16	at Colorado State–Greeley	Greeley, CO	W 10–7	2,500	
October 24	at College of Idaho*	Caldwell, ID	L 9–46		
October 31	at Montana State	Bozeman, MT	W 13–0		
November 7	Western State (CO)	Spud Bowl; Pocatello, ID	W 33–20		
November 14	at Nevada*	Mackay Field; Reno, NV	W 34–13	< 2,000	
*Non-conference game; ^{†}Homecoming
