= Guy Wicks =

American baseball player (1902–1968)

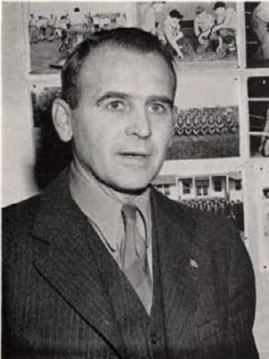
- Wicks in 1946

Biographical details
- Born: June 8, 1902; Eustis, Nebraska, U.S.
- Died: January 16, 1968 (aged 65); Atlanta, Georgia, U.S.

Playing career

Baseball
- 1922–1924: Idaho
- Position: Infielder

Coaching career (HC unless noted)

Football
- 1935–1940: Idaho–Southern Branch

Basketball
- 1925–1927: Genesee HS (ID)
- 1927–1930: Moscow HS (ID)
- 1930–1931: North Central HS (WA)
- 1931–1941: Idaho–Southern Branch
- 1941–1942: Idaho
- 1946–1947: Idaho

Baseball
- 1942: Idaho
- 1946–1947: Idaho

Administrative career (AD unless noted)
- 1931–1935: Idaho–Southern Branch (assistant AD)
- 1935–1941: Idaho–Southern Branch

Head coaching record
- Overall: 29–17–1 (college football); 184–111 (college basketball); 22–55 (college baseball)
- Military career
- Allegiance: United States
- Branch: United States Navy
- Service years: 1942–1946
- Rank: Lieutenant Commander
- Unit: Training
- Conflicts: World War II

Guy Plumb Wicks (June 8, 1902 – January 16, 1968) was an American coach of college athletics and a university administrator; he coached basketball, baseball, and football in the state of Idaho.

== Early years ==
Born in Eustis, Nebraska, Wicks moved with his family to the Palouse region of northern Idaho. He graduated from Moscow High School and the University of Idaho, also in Moscow, where he played baseball for the Vandals, and was a member of Sigma Nu fraternity.

== Coaching and administration ==
After receiving his bachelor's degree in 1925, Wicks coached multiple sports at the high school level in nearby Genesee for two years, back at Moscow for three, and at North Central in Spokane for one.

Wicks moved to Pocatello in southeastern Idaho in 1931 to become assistant athletic director at the University of Idaho's Southern Branch (then a two-year school, and now Idaho State University), where he also coached the basketball team. With the departure of Felix Plastino in 1935, Wicks became athletic director, and also became head football coach, posting a 29–17–1 (.628) record in six seasons with the Bengals.

After a decade in Pocatello, Wicks returned to Moscow in 1941 to coach basketball and baseball for the Vandals. During World War II, he served as an officer in the U.S. Navy, then returned to coach at Idaho in 1946. Wicks later worked in the athletic department and then in university administration, as the associate dean of students.

== Death ==
Following his retirement from the university in 1966, Wicks worked for the Sigma Nu fraternity. While in Atlanta to visit the chapter at Emory University, he fell ill and died in early 1968 at the university hospital; he had battled chronic lymphatic leukemia since 1960.

== Personal ==
Wicks married Lela Grace Jain (1906–1997) of Genesee in 1929. She outlived her husband by nearly three decades, and was a leading citizen in Moscow. Grace entered UI in 1925 and was a member of Pi Sigma Rho sorority, which became Alpha Phi in 1928. Illness from influenza delayed her graduation until 1933, majoring in English with a minor in music. With two older brothers having served in World War I, she assisted in the promotion of the Memorial Gymnasium, which opened in 1928.

Grace was a financial advisor in the 1950s, elected a county commissioner in the early 1960s (both very uncommon for a woman at the time), and later the local chair of the Republican Party. A major contributor to the county historical society, she had a long run as a newspaper columnist as a senior for the Moscow-Pullman Daily News, writing right up until her death, which came a day shy of age 91.

The couple is buried together at the city cemetery in Genesee; they had two children, Grace Jain and Donald, and eight grandchildren.

== Legacy ==
A year after his death, Idaho's recently relocated baseball field (46.7316°N 117.0195°W) was named for Wicks during the 1969 postseason. In the vast open area at the northwest corner of the campus which includes multiple intramural fields, the name "Guy Wicks Field" is now primarily attached to the women's soccer field at the western edge. Baseball was dropped as a varsity sport after 1980, and women's soccer was added in the fall of 1998.

The university's "Guy and Grace Wicks Award" annually recognizes two outstanding seniors, based on academic success, campus activities, and service to the university and the community.

Wicks was inducted to the athletic halls of fame at Idaho State University in 1980 and at the University of Idaho in 2008.

== Head coaching record ==
=== College football ===
| Year | Team | Overall | Conference | Standing | Bowl/playoffs |
|---|---|---|---|---|---|
Idaho Southern Branch Bengals (Independent) (1935–1940)
| 1935 | Idaho Southern Branch | 7–0–1 | | | |
| 1936 | Idaho Southern Branch | 4–4 | | | |
| 1937 | Idaho Southern Branch | 6–3 | | | |
| 1938 | Idaho Southern Branch | 4–3 | | | |
| 1939 | Idaho Southern Branch | 5–2 (Note: Idaho State claims a 5–2 record for the 1939 season; however, contemporary newspapers reported that the team actually lost its final game of the season, to Chaffey College, which would yield a 4–3 record.) | | | |
| 1940 | Idaho Southern Branch | 3–5 | | | |
| Idaho Southern Branch: | | 29–17–1 | | | |
| Total: | | 29–17–1 | | | |
