= Garth Hall =

American football player and coach

Biographical details
- Born: c. 1946

Playing career
- 1965–1967: Utah State
- Position: Wide receiver

Coaching career (HC unless noted)
- 1974–1982: BYU (assistant)
- 1983–1984: Tulane (OC)
- 1985–1987: Oregon State (OC)
- 1988–1991: Idaho State

Head coaching record
- Overall: 9–33–1

Garth Vaughn Hall (born c. 1946) is an American former college football coach. He served as the head football coach at Idaho State University from 1988 to 1991, compiling a record of 9–33–1. Hall was an assistant football coach at Brigham Young University from 1974 to 1982. He was hired as the offensive coordinator at Tulane University in 1983 by head coach Wally English.

== Head coaching record ==
Year	Team	Overall	Conference	Standing	Bowl/playoffs
Idaho State Bengals (Big Sky Conference) (1988–1991)
1988	Idaho State	0–11	0–8	9th	
1989	Idaho State	3–7	2–6	T–6th	
1990	Idaho State	3–8	1–7	9th	
1991	Idaho State	3–7–1	2–6	7th	
Idaho State:		9–33–1	5–27		
Total:		9–33–1			
