= Brian McNeely =

American football player and coach (1957–2015)

Biographical details
- Born: September 29, 1957; Dodge City, Kansas, U.S.
- Died: May 2, 2015 (aged 57); Morrison, Colorado, U.S.

Playing career
- c. 1975: Garden City

Coaching career (HC unless noted)
- 1978–1979: Butler County (assistant)
- 1981: Pratt (assistant)
- 1982–1984: Butler County
- 1985: Kansas (assistant)
- 1986–1991: Garden City
- 1992–1996: Idaho State
- 2000: Colorado (DFO/RC)
- 2002–2004: Indiana (AHC/RC)

Head coaching record
- Overall: 21–34 (college); 59–32–2 (junior college)
- Tournaments: 6–3 (KJCCC playoffs)

Accomplishments and honors

Championships
- 2 KJCCC regular season (1989, 1991); 2 KJCCC playoffs (1988, 1991)

Brian Scott McNeely (September 29, 1957 – May 2, 2015) was an American college football coach. He served as the head football coach at Idaho State University from 1992 to 1996, compiling a record of 21–34. McNeely was also the head football coach at Butler County Community College—now known as Butler Community College—in El Dorado, Kansas from 1982 to 1984 and Garden City Community College in Garden City, Kansas from 1986 to 1991, amassing a career junior college football head coaching record of 59–32–2.

McNeely died of cancer on May 2, 2015.

== Head coaching record ==
=== College ===
Year	Team	Overall	Conference	Standing	Bowl/playoffs
Idaho State Bengals (Big Sky Conference) (1992–1996)
1992	Idaho State	3–8	1–6	8th	
1993	Idaho State	2–9	0–7	8th	
1994	Idaho State	6–5	4–3	T–4th	
1995	Idaho State	6–5	3–4	6th	
1996	Idaho State	4–7	1–6	7th	
Idaho State:		21–34	9–26		
Total:		21–34			

=== Junior college ===
Year	Team	Overall	Conference	Standing	Bowl/playoffs
Butler County Grizzlies (Kansas Jayhawk Community College Conference) (1982–1984)
1982	Butler County	4–4–1	3–4–1	T–6th	
1983	Butler County	6–3	5–3	4th	
1984	Butler County	6–3	5–2	T–2nd	
Butler County:		16–10–1	13–9–1		
Garden City Broncbusters (Kansas Jayhawk Community College Conference) (1986–1991)
1986	Garden City	3–6	1–6	8th	
1987	Garden City	7–4	3–3	4th	L KJCCC championship
1988	Garden City	7–4	3–3	T–2nd	W KJCCC championship
1989	Garden City	10–2	6–0	1st	L KJCCC championship, W Centennial Bowl
1990	Garden City	8–3	5–1	2nd	L KJCCC semifinal, W Centennial Bowl
1991	Garden City	8–3–1	4–1–1	T–1st	W KJCCC championship, L Real Dairy Bowl
Garden City:		43–22–1	22–14–1		
Total:		59–32–2			
National championship Conference title Conference division title or championship game berth
