= Ed Cavanaugh =

American football player and coach (1928–1999)

Biographical details
- Born: August 25, 1928; New Haven, Connecticut, U.S.
- Died: March 22, 1999 (aged 70); Vero Beach, Florida, U.S.

Playing career
- 1949–1950: Duke
- Position: Guard

Coaching career (HC unless noted)
- 1955–1958: Kansas State (assistant)
- 1959–1966: Arizona (assistant)
- 1967: Utah State (assistant)
- 1968–1971: Idaho State
- 1972–1976: Buffalo Bills (assistant)
- 1977–1978: Miami (FL) (OL)
- 1979: Army (OL)
- 1980–1982: Army
- 1986–1992: Rhode Island (OL)

Head coaching record
- Overall: 30–40–2

Edward Michael Cavanaugh (August 25, 1928 – March 22, 1999) was an American college football player and coach. He served as the head football coach at Idaho State University in Pocatello from 1968 to 1971 and the United States Military Academy from 1980 to 1982, compiling a career head coaching record 30–40–2.

Cavanaugh played college football at Duke University as a guard before graduating in 1951.

Cavanaugh died at his residence in Vero Beach, Florida, on March 22, 1999, at the age of 70.

== Head coaching record ==
| Year | Team | Overall | Conference | Standing | Bowl/playoffs |
|---|---|---|---|---|---|
Idaho State Bengals (Big Sky Conference) (1968–1971)
| 1968 | Idaho State | 4–5 | 1–3 | 4th | |
| 1969 | Idaho State | 5–5 | 2–2 | 3rd | |
| 1970 | Idaho State | 5–5 | 3–2 | 2nd | |
| 1971 | Idaho State | 6–4 | 2–3 | 5th | |
| Idaho State: | | 20–19 | 8–10 | | |
Army Cadets (NCAA Division I-A independent) (1980–1982)
| 1980 | Army | 3–7–1 | | | |
| 1981 | Army | 3–7–1 | | | |
| 1982 | Army | 4–7 | | | |
| Army: | | 10–21–2 | | | |
| Total: | | 30–40–2 | | | |
