= Dave Kragthorpe =

American football player and coach (1933–2026)

Biographical details
- Born: May 1, 1933; Mound, Minnesota, U.S.
- Died: August 23, 2026 (aged 93); Montgomery, Texas, U.S.

Playing career
- 1951–1954: Utah State
- Position: Tackle

Coaching career (HC unless noted)
- 1957: Utah State (OL- freshmen)
- 1958–1959: Idaho Falls HS (ID) (assistant)
- 1960–1963: Wyandotte HS (MI)
- 1965–1966: Montana (assistant)
- 1967–1968: South Dakota State (assistant)
- 1969: South Dakota State
- 1970–1975: BYU (OC/OL)
- 1976–1979: BYU (AHC/OL)
- 1980–1982: Idaho State
- 1985–1990: Oregon State
- 1991: New Mexico (OL)

Administrative career (AD unless noted)
- 1983–1985: Utah State

Head coaching record
- Overall: 41–69–2
- Tournaments: 3–0 (NCAA D-I-AA playoffs)

Accomplishments and honors

Championships
- 1 NCAA Division I-AA (1981); 1 Big Sky (1981)

Awards
- Pac-10 Coach of the Year (1989)

David Stanley Kragthorpe (May 1, 1933 – August 23, 2026) was an American football player and coach. He was the head football coach at South Dakota State University in 1969, Idaho State University from 1980 to 1982, and Oregon State University from 1985 to 1990, compiling a career college football record of 41–69–2.

== Early life ==
Kragthorpe attended Utah State University in Logan, where he excelled as a two-way tackle for the Aggies from 1951 to 1954. In addition, he was also on the baseball team. Despite all his athletic obligations, Kragthorpe graduated with double bachelor's degrees in physical education and recreation education in 1955. He played one season for the New York Giants as a guard, being taken 188th overall in the 16th round of the 1955 NFL draft. After spending two years in the United States Navy, he returned to Utah State and earned his master's degree in secondary education in 1963.

== Coaching career ==
Kragthorpe was an assistant coach for two seasons at Montana and two at South Dakota State; he was promoted to head coach at SDSU in 1969, and posted a 3–7 record. He then served as offensive line coach and offensive coordinator at Brigham Young University, under former USU teammate LaVell Edwards from 1970 to 1975. Under Edwards' and Kragthorpe's leadership, the Cougars became one of the first programs committed to throwing the football in the 1970s, a time when "three yards and a cloud of dust" was still the dominant sentiment in college football. Kragthorpe continued to coach the offensive line under new offensive coordinator Doug Scovil from 1976 to 1979.

=== Idaho State ===
After a winless 0–11 season in 1979 under Bud Hake, Idaho State athletic director, I. J. "Babe" Caccia decided to try to import some of the passing magic to Pocatello from nearby Provo, Utah. He hired Kragthorpe as his head coach in November 1979, and the Bengals improved to 6–5 in 1980 and came within nine points of eventual national champion Boise State in the season finale.

The best results were definitely in his second season in 1981, when the Bengals won the Big Sky Conference title, hosted two playoff wins, and won the Division I-AA championship in Texas for a 12–1 season. They were led by senior quarterback Mike Machurek, a junior college transfer from California; he was a sixth-round pick in the 1982 NFL draft, serving as a reserve player with the Detroit Lions. During the 1981 season, Idaho State outscored its opponents 422–172. The following year, the Bengals fell to 3–8; Kragthorpe was 21–14 (.600) in three seasons at ISU, from 1980 to 1982.

In June 1983, Kragthorpe stepped away from the sidelines to take over as athletics director at his alma mater, Utah State in Logan.

=== Oregon State ===
Eighteen months later, in December 1984, Kragthorpe returned to coaching when he was hired to replace Joe Avezzano at Oregon State University. Kragthorpe's hiring capped a 35-day search process headed by university president John V. Byrne; the job had previously been offered to Los Angeles Raiders assistant coach Sam Boghosian, who elected to stay instead in the coaching ranks of the National Football League.

The 51-year old Kragthorpe reportedly signed a five year contract with the Beavers paying a base salary of $85,000 per year, with the OSU Beaver Club booster organization pledging $25,000 of the total. Acknowledging the disastrous state of affairs of the Oregon State football program with its five year record of 6–47–2 (.127) under former head coach Avezzano, Kragthorpe preached patience, declaring, "I don't think success is going to be immediate—nothing comes that quickly. I go in with my eyes open."

Once again, Kragthorpe implemented a pass-oriented offense for the 1985 season, with the team branded as the "Air Express" as a tip of the hat to the school's successful "Orange Express" basketball program.

Kragthorpe had little coaching success in the Pacific-10 Conference, failing to have a winning record in any of his six seasons with Oregon State and finishing no better than 6th, compiling an overall record of 17–48–2 (.269). In recognition of how difficult the Oregon State job was perceived to be in those days, Kragthorpe won the Pac-10 Coach of the Year honors in 1989, despite having a 4–7–1 record that year with the Beavers. Kragthorpe resigned from Oregon State on November 21, 1990, after an especially disappointing 1–10 result that season.

==== 1985 Washington game ====
Despite Kragthorpe's record at Oregon State, he will be forever linked to one of the greatest wins in program history. In his first season at the helm, Kragthorpe led the Beavers (2–4) into Husky Stadium in Seattle to take on the Washington Huskies as 38-point underdogs. With 1:29 left in the fourth quarter, the Beavers successfully blocked a Washington punt and recovered the ball in the end zone for the winning touchdown; the final score of 21–20 was then the largest upset by point spread in college football history.

== Later life and death ==
In 1994, Kragthorpe was hired by the USU Alumni Association to resurrect the university's alumni chapters program. Despite officially retiring in 2001, Kragthorpe could for years still be found at his desk in the Alumni Office, overseeing the USU alumni chapters in Idaho and northern Nevada.

Kragthorpe was a member of the Old Main Society, Alumni Sustaining Membership program, Big Blue Club, and the Emeriti Association. In 2005, he received the Distinguished Alumnus Award. His son, Kurt, is a sportswriter for the Salt Lake Tribune, while another son, Steve, served as head coach at Tulsa and Louisville. Grandson Brad Kragthorpe is an assistant for the Cincinnati Bengals.

Kragthorpe and his wife, Barbara, split their time between Logan, Utah and Louisville, Kentucky. He died in Montgomery, Texas on August 23, 2026, at the age of 93.

== Head coaching record ==
Year	Team	Overall	Conference	Standing	Bowl/playoffs
South Dakota State Jackrabbits (North Central Conference) (1969)
1969	South Dakota State	3–7	3–3	3rd	
South Dakota State:		3–7	3–3		
Idaho State Bengals (Big Sky Conference) (1980–1982)
1980	Idaho State	6–5	4–4	T–3rd	
1981	Idaho State	12–1	6–1	T–1st	W NCAA Division I-AA Championship
1982	Idaho State	3–8	1–6	8th	
Idaho State:		21–14	11–11		
Oregon State Beavers (Pacific-10 Conference) (1985–1990)
1985	Oregon State	3–8	2–6	9th	
1986	Oregon State	3–8	2–5	10th	
1987	Oregon State	2–9	0–7	10th	
1988	Oregon State	4–6–1	2–5–1	8th	
1989	Oregon State	4–7–1	3–4–1	6th	
1990	Oregon State	1–10	1–6	10th	
Oregon State:		17–48–2	10–33–2		
Total:		41–69–2			
National championship Conference title Conference division title or championship game berth
