= John Zamberlin =

American football player and coach (born 1956)

No. 54, 61, 56
- Position: Linebacker

Personal information
- Born: February 13, 1956 (age 70); Tacoma, Washington, U.S.
- Listed height: 6 ft 2 in (1.88 m)
- Listed weight: 230 lb (104 kg)

Career information
- High school: Woodrow Wilson (Tacoma, Washington)
- College: Pacific Lutheran
- NFL draft: 1979: 5th round, 135th overall pick

Career history

Playing
- New England Patriots (1979–1982); Kansas City Chiefs (1983–1984)

Coaching
- UMass (1987–1990) (defensive assistant); Eastern Washington (1992–1994) (defensive assistant); Richmond (1995–1996) (defensive coordinator); Central Washington (1997–2006) (head coach); Idaho State (2007–2010) (head coach); Weber State (2011) (defensive tackles coach); Hamilton Tiger-Cats (2012–2013) (linebackers coach); Meridian HS (ID) (2019–present) (head coach)

Career NFL statistics
- Sacks: 3.5
- Fumble recoveries: 1
- Interceptions: 1
- Stats at Pro Football Reference

John Zamberlin (born February 13, 1956) is an American football coach and former player. He is the head football coach at Meridian High School in Meridian, Idaho, a position he has held since 2019. Zamberlin played professionally as a linebacker in the National Football League (NFL) with the New England Patriots from 1979 to 1982 and the Kansas City Chiefs from 1983 to 1983. He served as the head football coach at Central Washington University from 1997 to 2006 and at Idaho State University from 2007 to 2010. In 2011, Zamberlin was the defensive tackles coach at Weber State University. He was the linebackers coach for the Hamilton Tiger-Cats of the Canadian Football League (CFL) from 2012 to 2013.

== Head coaching record ==
| Year | Team | Overall | Conference | Standing | Bowl/playoffs |
|---|---|---|---|---|---|
Central Washington Wildcats (Great Northwest Athletic Conference) (1997–2005)
| 1997 | Central Washington | 5–4 | 3–2 | 3rd | |
| 1998 | Central Washington | 7–4 | 4–1 | T–1st | NAIA Quarterfinal |
| 1999 | Central Washington | 4–5 | 2–2 | 3rd | |
| 2000 | Central Washington | 5–5 | 3–1 | 2nd | |
| 2001 | Central Washington | 4–7 | 1–2 | 3rd | |
| 2002 | Central Washington | 11–1 | 3–0 | 1st | NCAA Division II First Round |
| 2003 | Central Washington | 6–4 | 2–1 | 2nd | |
| 2004 | Central Washington | 7–4 | 5–1 | 1st | |
| 2005 | Central Washington | 8–2 | 6–0 | 1st | |
Central Washington Wildcats (North Central Conference) (2006)
| 2006 | Central Washington | 6–5 | 3–5 | T–5th | |
| Central Washington: | | 63–41 | 31–15 | | |
Idaho State Bengals (Big Sky Conference) (2007–2010)
| 2007 | Idaho State | 3–8 | 2–6 | 8th | |
| 2008 | Idaho State | 1–11 | 1–7 | T–8th | |
| 2009 | Idaho State | 1–10 | 1–7 | T–7th | |
| 2010 | Idaho State | 1–10 | 0–8 | 9th | |
| Idaho State: | | 6–39 | 4–28 | | |
| Total: | | 69–80 | | | |
National championship Conference title Conference division title or championship game berth
