= Rob Phenicie =

American football player and coach (born 1966)

Current position
- Title: Assistant head coach, tight ends coach
- Team: Montana
- Conference: Big Sky

Biographical details
- Born: March 4, 1966 (age 60); Huntington Beach, California, U.S.

Playing career
- 1984–1985: Nebraska
- 1986: Orange Coast
- 1987: Memphis
- Position: Tight end

Coaching career (HC unless noted)
- 1989–1991: Memphis (GA)
- 1991–1992: UCLA (GA)
- 1992–1996: Los Angeles Valley (QB/WR)
- 1997–1998: Cal State Northridge (OC/QB/WR)
- 1999: UNLV (assistant)
- 2000–2001: Wyoming (WR)
- 2002: Wyoming (PGC/WR)
- 2003–2009: Montana (OC/QB)
- 2010–2011: UNLV (OC/QB)
- 2012: UNLV (QB)
- 2013–2014: UNLV (TE)
- 2015–2016: Idaho State (WR)
- 2017–2021: Idaho State
- 2022: Montana (analyst)
- 2023: Montana (TE/OT)
- 2024–present: Montana (AHC/TE)

Head coaching record
- Overall: 16–35

Robert Alan Phenicie (born March 4, 1966) is an American football coach and former player. He is the assistant head football coach and tight ends coach at Montana. Previously, Phenicie was the head coach at Idaho State University. He was named the head coach in March 2017, staying until his firing, following the 2021 season. Phenicie's other coaching stops took him to the University of Memphis, UCLA, Los Angeles Valley College, Cal State Northridge, the University of Montana and UNLV.

== Coaching career ==
Following Phenicie's graduation from Memphis, he pursued his master's degree while serving as an offensive graduate assistant for the Memphis Tigers football team from 1989–1991.

He then went to UCLA, also as an offensive graduate assistant in 1991 and 1992.

He then coached the wide receivers and quarterbacks at Los Angeles Valley College through the 1996 season.

From there, Phenicie moved on to be the offensive coordinator at Cal State Northridge for two seasons (1997–1998). He also coached the quarterbacks and the wide receivers.

In 1999, Phenicie was an assistant at UNLV.

Phenicie then moved on to Wyoming, serving as the wide receivers coach and recruiting coordinator from 2000–2002. He also added co-offensive coordinator duties for the 2002 season.

In 2003, Phenicie joined the Montana coaching staff as offensive coordinator and quarterbacks coach. He helped head coach Bobby Hauck lead the Grizzlies to three national championship game appearances.

In 2010, he made his second stop at UNLV. This time, Phenicie stayed five years. He was the offensive coordinator in 2010 and 2011, coached the quarterbacks from 2010–2012, and coached the tight ends in 2013 and 2014.

Phenicie then joined the Idaho State coaching staff as the assistant head coach for offense and wide receivers coach in 2015. Following the 2016 season, Phenicie was promoted to offensive coordinator, but soon after left to take a position on the Northern Iowa coaching staff. A week later, Idaho State head coach, Mike Kramer, retired. The next day, a week before spring practices were set to begin, Phenicie was named the head coach at Idaho State.

Phenicie's original contract was a two-year deal, and made him the head coach for the 2017 season, and guaranteed that he would remain on staff as at least the offensive coordinator in the second year. In December 2017, Phenicie was rewarded with a new contract, nearly doubling his salary, and making him the permanent head coach.

Following his time at Idaho State, Phenicie returned to Montana as an offensive analyst.

== Playing career ==
Phenicie began his college playing career as a tight end at Nebraska in 1984. He then transferred to Orange Coast College for a year, and then moved on to Memphis. He played in 11 games and caught four passes for 50 yards in 1987 for the Tigers.

== Personal life ==
Phenicie received his bachelor's degree in Sociology from the University of Memphis in 1989 and his master's degree in Athletic Administration from the University of Memphis in 1991. He and his wife, Jennifer, have one daughter, Meghen.

== Head coaching record ==
Year	Team	Overall	Conference	Standing	Bowl/playoffs
Idaho State Bengals (Big Sky Conference) (2017–2021)
2017	Idaho State	4–7	2–6	T–9th	
2018	Idaho State	6–5	5–3	T–4th	
2019	Idaho State	3–9	2–6	T–9th	
2020–21	Idaho State	2–4	2–4	T–6th	
2021	Idaho State	1–10	1–7	T–11th	
Idaho State:		16–35	12–26		
Total:		16–35			
