= Babe Caccia =

American football coach and administrator (1917–2009)

Biographical details
- Born: October 3, 1917; Pocatello, Idaho, U.S.
- Died: August 28, 2009 (aged 91); Pocatello, Idaho, U.S.
- Education: University of Idaho, 1941

Playing career

Football
- 1936–1937: Idaho–Southern Branch
- Positions: Center, linebacker

Coaching career (HC unless noted)

Football
- 1946–1947: Pocatello Cross HS (ID) (line)
- 1948–1951: Idaho State (assistant)
- 1952–1965: Idaho State
- 1976: Edmonton Eskimos (line)

Administrative career (AD unless noted)
- 1965–1979: Idaho State (assistant AD)
- 1979–1986: Idaho State

Head coaching record
- Overall: 79–38–2 (college football)

Accomplishments and honors

Championships
- Football; 5 RMC (1952–1953, 1955, 1957, 1959); 1 Big Sky (1963)

Italo John "Babe" Caccia (October 3, 1917 – August 28, 2009) was an American college football and athletics administrator in Idaho.

== Biography ==
Caccia was born in Pocatello, Idaho, in 1917. He played on the football teams of Idaho State University (ISU)—then known as Idaho–Southern Branch—in Pocatello in 1936 and 1937. He graduated from the University of Idaho in 1941, then served in the United States Navy during World War II.

Caccia served as the head football coach at ISU from 1953 to 1965, compiling a record of 79–38–2 (.672), then became assistant athletic director. ISU football teams won six conference championships in the 14 seasons that Caccia was head coach. He later was the athletic director at ISU, from 1979 to 1986.

Caccia was inducted to the ISU athletic hall of fame in 1961. He died in Pocatello at age 91 in 2009.

== Head coaching record ==
=== College football ===
Year	Team	Overall	Conference	Standing	Bowl/playoffs
Idaho State Bengals (Rocky Mountain Conference) (1952–1960)
1952	Idaho State	8–0	5–0	1st	
1953	Idaho State	6–3	5–0	1st	
1954	Idaho State	4–4	3–3	3rd	
1955	Idaho State	8–1	6–0	1st	
1956	Idaho State	6–3	3–2	T–2nd	
1957	Idaho State	9–0	5–0	1st	
1958	Idaho State	4–5	3–2	T–3rd	
1959	Idaho State	6–2	4–0	1st	
1960	Idaho State	6–2	3–1	2nd	
Idaho State Bengals (NCAA College Division independent) (1961–1962)
1961	Idaho State	5–2–1			
1962	Idaho State	3–6			
Idaho State Bengals (Big Sky Conference) (1963–1965)
1963	Idaho State	5–3	3–1	1st	
1964	Idaho State	6–3	2–1	2nd	
1965	Idaho State	3–5–1	1–3	T–4th	
Idaho State:		79–38–2	43–13		
Total:		79–38–2			
National championship Conference title Conference division title or championship game berth
