= Idaho State Bengals football =

Football team of Idaho State University

2026 Idaho State Bengals football team
- First season: 1902; 124 years ago
- Athletic director: Pauline Thiros
- Head coach: Cody Hawkins; 4th season, 20–25 (.444)
- Location: Pocatello, Idaho
- Stadium: ICCU Dome (capacity: 12,000)
- NCAA division: Division I FCS
- Conference: Big Sky
- Colors: Orange and black
- All-time record: 499–578–20 (.464)
- Bowl record: 2–0 (1.000)

NCAA Division I FCS championships
- 1981

Conference championships
- RMAC: 1952, 1953, 1955, 1957, 1959 Big Sky: 1963, 1981, 2002
- Rivalries: Idaho (rivalry)
- Fight song: Growl, Bengals, Growl
- Mascot: Benny the Bengal
- Marching band: Bengal Marching Band
- Website: ISUBengals.com

The Idaho State Bengals football program represents Idaho State University in college football. The Bengals play their home games at the ICCU Dome, an indoor facility on campus in Pocatello, Idaho. Idaho State is a charter member of the Big Sky Conference in NCAA Division I Football Championship Subdivision (FCS) (formerly Division I-AA). Through the 2022 season, the Bengals have an all-time record of 482–550–20 (.468). Idaho State's current head coach is Cody Hawkins, who was hired on December 11, 2022.

== History ==
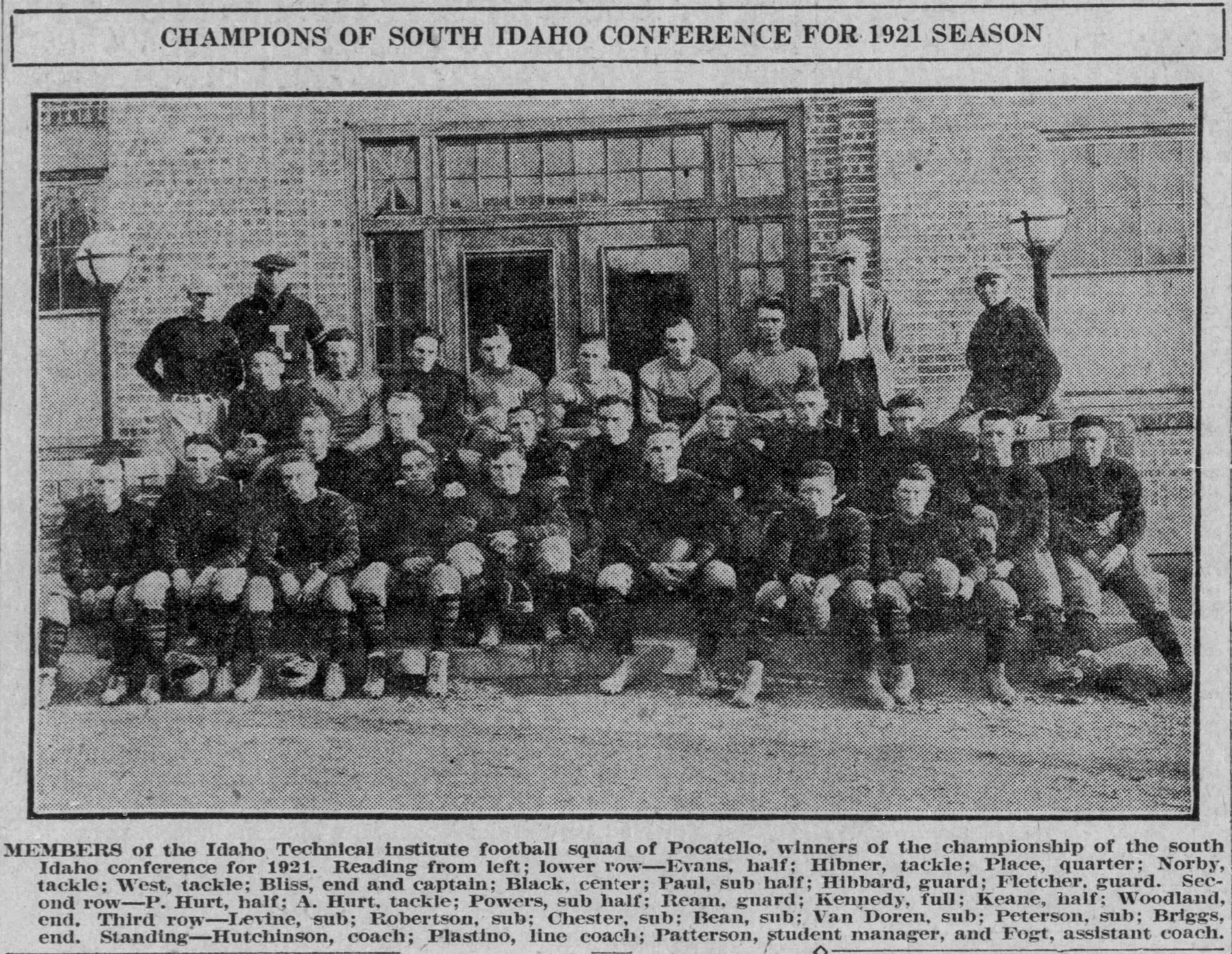
1921 Idaho Technical Tigers team photo

The university and its football team have been known by several names since the program's inaugural season of 1902:

- 1902–1914: Academy of Idaho Bantams
- 1915–1926: Idaho Technical Tigers
  - No team was fielded during the 1918 influenza pandemic
- 1927–1934: Idaho Southern Branch Tigers
- 1935–1946: Idaho Southern Branch Bengals
  - Due to World War II, no team was fielded in 1943 or 1945
- 1947–present: Idaho State Bengals

=== Early history (1902–1934) ===
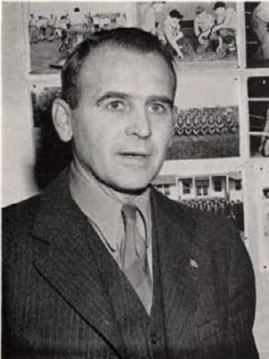
Guy Wicks

Idaho State first started fielding football in 1902, one year after the school was established as the Academy of Idaho. From 1902 to 1934, the program had 10 different head coaches, seven of which coached for less than three seasons. The Bantams and Tigers, as they were known until 1904 and 1934, respectively, found some success during this era, with a total record of 117–70–10 (.619). Herbert Cheney, the program's first ever head coach, has the highest winning percentage of any coach in program history, with a record of 5–1–1 (.786).

=== Guy Wicks era (1935–1940) ===
Guy Wicks spent six total seasons with the Bengals. He accumulated a record of 29–17–1 (.628). He only had one losing season with the program, during 1940, with a record of 3–5. Wicks was also the head basketball coach at the school from 1931 to 1941.

=== John Vesser era (1941–1951) ===
Wick's successor, John Vesser, stayed nine total seasons with Idaho State. He was the head coach when Idaho State moved from being an independent program to being a member of the Rocky Mountain Athletic Conference (RMAC). In total, he had a record of 41–27–6 (.595).

=== Babe Caccia era (1952–1965) ===
Babe Caccia played as both a center and a linebacker when he played for Idaho State (then known as Idaho Southern Branch) in 1936 and 1937. Babe was the head coach of the football program for 14 seasons, the most of any head coach, and won six conference titles. This included the first ever Big Sky title in 1963. After his run as head coach, he became assistant athletic director for Idaho State from 1965 to 1979, and athletic director from 1979 to 1986. For one year in 1976, he acted as line coach for the Edmonton Eskimos (now Edmonton Elks) of the Canadian Football League (CFL). He boasted a fairly successful record of 79–38–2 (.664) with Idaho State.

=== Leo McKillip era (1966–1967) ===
Leo McKillip only coached for two seasons, having a losing record in both of them. He was Idaho State's first head coach to have a winning percentage below .500 since 1904, totaling 4–15 (.211).

=== Ed Cavanaugh era (1968–1971) ===
Ed Cavanaugh took over as head coach in 1968. He improved over his predecessor, with a total record of 20–19 (.596). He was the head coach when Idaho State opened the ASISU Minidome, renamed as Holt Arena in 1988.

=== Bob Griffin era (1972–1975) ===
Bob Griffin took over in 1972, and he remained with Idaho State for four total seasons, accumulating a 21–20 (.512) record. He went on to have a successful career with the Rhode Island Rams after his stay at Idaho State.

=== Joe Pascale era (1976) ===
Joe Pascale was the defensive coordinator for two seasons, then was promoted to head coach in February 1976 when Bob Griffin departed for Rhode Island. During the lone season Pascale led the Bengals, they managed just one victory, a close 27–22 win at home over Nevada; ISU finished at 1–9 (.100) and winless (0–6) in conference. His one-year contract was not renewed, and he became an assistant coach at Princeton in the Ivy League.

=== Bud Hake era (1977–1979) ===
Bud Hake came to ISU in 1977 from the junior college ranks; he was previously the head coach for a decade at Grays Harbor College in Aberdeen, Washington. In 1978, the Bengals traveled to Japan to play the Utah State Aggies in Nishinomiya on September 3, and were shut out 10–0. Hake's three seasons resulted in a dismal 5–28 (.152) record with only two wins in conference, both in 1977. After a winless 0–11 season in 1979, he soon resigned.

=== Dave Kragthorpe era (1980–1982) ===
Previously the offensive line coach at BYU, Dave Kragthorpe was hired as head coach in late November 1979, During his first season in 1980, the rebuilding Bengals were 6–5 and won half of their conference games. In 1981, Idaho State had a 12–1 (.923) record, and won the NCAA Division I-AA Football Championship, beating Eastern Kentucky 34–23 in the 1981 Pioneer Bowl. Despite this success, ISU finished at 3–8 the following season. In his three years leading the Bengals, Kragthorpe went 21–14 (.600). He departed in June 1983 to become the athletic director at his alma mater, Utah State, then was the head coach at Oregon State from 1985 to 1990. Through 2022, Kragthorpe is the most recent Bengal head coach with an overall winning record.

=== Jim Koetter era (1983–1987) ===
Alumnus and assistant coach Jim Koetter was promoted to head coach in June 1983; he led the Bengals to the Division I-AA playoffs that season, but fell in the first round to Nevada to finish at 8–4. In five seasons as head coach, Koetter compiled a 23–32–1 (.420) record. Previously a longtime head coach in Pocatello at Highland High School, he then coached at Pocatello High School.

=== Garth Hall era (1988–1991) ===
Garth Hall was formerly an offensive coordinator at both Tulane and Oregon State before he took his place as head coach in Idaho State. He failed to find much success, finishing 9–33–1 (.214), going 0–11 during his first season as a head coach. Hall coached the last Bengals game that ended in a tie, 35–35 at Southern Utah in 1991.

=== Brian McNeely era (1992–1996) ===
Brian McNeely took up as head coach after Hall. He finished with a record of 21–34 (.382).

=== Tom Walsh era (1997–1998) ===
Tom Walsh was the offensive coordinator for the Los Angeles Raiders of the National Football League (NFL) before he started his career in Idaho State. He totaled 6–16 (.261) during his two-season stay with Idaho State.

=== Larry Lewis era (1999–2006) ===
Larry Lewis took over after Walsh, and he remained head coach for 8 seasons. In 2002, he and the Bengals were tri-Big Sky Champions, sharing the champion title with Montana and Montana State.

Conference Champions:

Montana State, Montana, and Idaho State (5–2).Tiebreaker: Montana State won the tiebreaker (head-to-head) over Montana and Idaho State to secure the automatic NCAA bid. Montana won the tiebreaker over Idaho State based on overall record.

Lewis holds a record of 40–49 (.449) with the Bengals.

=== John Zamberlin era (2007–2010) ===
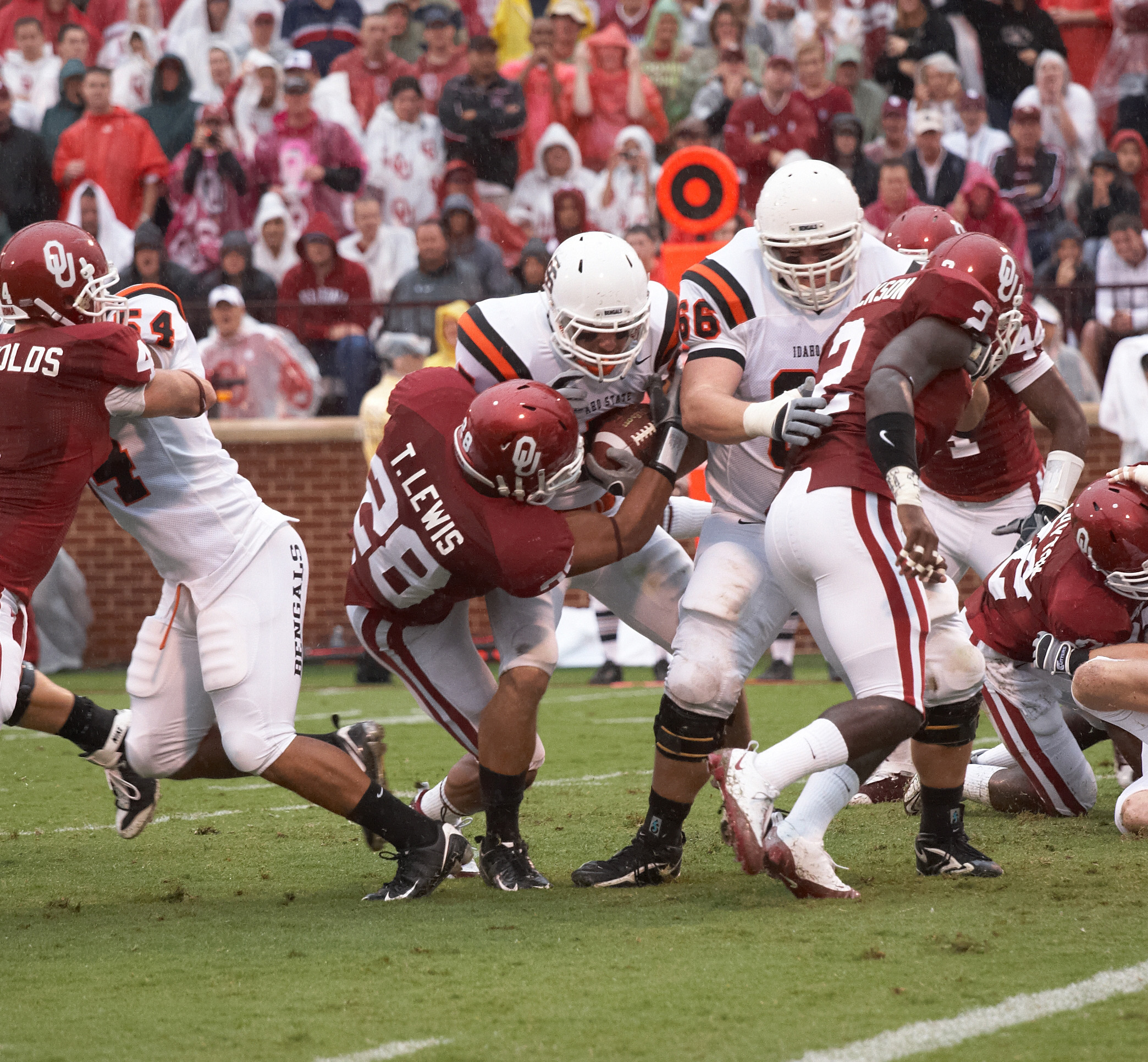
Idaho State (in white uniforms) playing the Oklahoma Sooners in 2009

John Zamberlin was head coach at Central Washington before he went to Idaho State. He won four conference championships as head coach of Central Washington. Zamberlain's contract was originally going to end in 2009, but Idaho State extended the contract by two seasons. The choice was very controversial among students due to the team's lack of success. He averaged 1.5 wins per season, and he ended his career 6–39 (.133), the second-lowest winning percentage in program history. He was later a linebackers coach for the Hamilton Tiger-Cats of the CFL from 2012 to 2013.

=== Mike Kramer era (2011–2016) ===
Mike Kramer was previously head coach at both Eastern Washington and Montana State, winning one conference title with Eastern Washington and three with Montana State. His most successful season came with the 2014 Bengals, who had a record of 8-4 and finished the season ranked 25th in the FCS, but the team did not make the playoffs. His total record was 18–50 (.265).

=== Rob Phenicie era (2017–2021) ===
In 2017, Kramer resigned as head coach, and Idaho State promoted wide receivers coach Rob Phenicie to head coach the same day. After five seasons with a cumulative record of 16–35 (.314), Phenicie was fired on November 20, 2021.

=== Charlie Ragle era (2022) ===
On December 10, 2021, former California special teams coordinator Charlie Ragle was hired to be the Bengals' head coach. On November 28, 2022, less than a year after being hired, Ragle left the Bengals after his first season, accumulating only one win. He currently holds the lowest win percentage in program history (.091).

=== Cody Hawkins era (2023–present) ===
After Ragle's departure, Idaho State hired Cody Hawkins, the offensive coordinator for two seasons at UC Davis. Hawkins quickly grew popular among the student body at Idaho State, earning the nickname "Daddy Hawkins." Hawkins ended his inaugural season with a 3–8 record. The most notable win in the season being against Eastern Washington dubbed the "Minidome Miracle" after coming back from a 27-point deficit late in the third quarter to win the game 42–41. In the 2025 season, Hawkins led the Bengals to a 6–6 overall record (5–3 in conference play), their first non-losing season since 2018, including Idaho State's first away victory against intrastate rival Idaho since 1981. Hawkins currently holds the highest winning percentage of any head coach since 2006.

== Conference affiliations ==
Idaho State's conference affiliations have been as follows:

- Independent (1902–1949, 1961–1962)
- Rocky Mountain Athletic Conference (1950–1960)
- Big Sky Conference (1963–present)

== Championships ==
=== National championships ===
Year	Coach	Selector	Record	Opponent	Result
1981	Dave Kragthorpe	I-AA Playoff	12–1	Eastern Kentucky	W 34–23

=== Conference championships ===
Idaho State has won eight conference championships, spanning two conferences.

Year	Conference	Overall record	Conference record
1952	Rocky Mountain Athletic Conference	8–0	5–0
1953	Rocky Mountain Athletic Conference	6–2	5–0
1955	Rocky Mountain Athletic Conference	8–1	5–0
1957	Rocky Mountain Athletic Conference	9–0	6–0
1959	Rocky Mountain Athletic Conference	6–2	4–0
1963	Big Sky Conference	5–3	3–1
1981	Big Sky Conference	12–1	6–1
2002	Big Sky Conference	8–3	5–2†

† Co-champions

=== Undefeated seasons ===
Idaho State has had seven undefeated seasons, under five different head coaches.

Year	Overall record	Conference record	Head coach
1902	5–0	n/a	Herbert Cheney
1905	3–0–2	n/a	Hubert Upjohn
1909	4–0	n/a	Harvey Holmes
1910	6–0	n/a	Harvey Holmes
1935	7–0–1	n/a	Guy Wicks
1952	8–0	5–0	Babe Caccia
1957	9–0	6–0	Babe Caccia

== Postseason results ==
=== Bowl games ===
The Bengals have appeared in, and won, two bowl games.

Date	Bowl	Opponent	Result	Ref.
November 24, 1949	Bean Bowl	Chadron State	W 20–2	
December 19, 1981	Pioneer Bowl	Eastern Kentucky	W 34–23	†

† Pioneer Bowl was an alternate name for the 1981 championship game, below.

=== Division I-AA/FCS playoffs ===
The Bengals have appeared in the I-AA/FCS playoffs three times with a record of 3–1. They were National Champions in 1981.

Year	Round	Opponent	Result
1981	Quarterfinals; Semifinals; National Championship Game	Rhode Island; South Carolina State; Eastern Kentucky	W 51–0; W 41–12; W 34–23
1983	First Round	Nevada	L 20–27
2026	First Round	North Dakota	TBD

== National award winners ==
- National Football Foundation National Scholar-Athlete Award

NFF National Scholar-Athlete Award
Year	Name	Position
1991	Steve Boyenger	Safety

== Retired numbers ==
Idaho State Bengals retired numbers
No.	Player	Pos.	Tenure	Ref.
41	Jared Allen	DE	2000–2003	

== All-Americans ==
The Bengals have had five two-time All-Americans: wide receiver Eddie Bell ('68–'69), defensive end Josh Hays ('95–96), placekicker Pete Garces ('98–'99), defensive end Jared Allen ('02–'03), and punter David Harrington ('10–'11). Allen also won the prestigious Buck Buchanan Award in 2003 as the top defensive player in the nation in Division I-AA. Wide receiver Rodrick Rumble was an All-American in 2011, a season in which he broke the Big Sky conference record for receptions with 112. Return specialist Tavoy Moore was given first-team All-American honors by the American Football Coaches Association (AFCA) for the 2010 season. Quarterback Mike Machurek was named a Kodak All-American for his 1981 championship season. Punter Jon Vanderwielen earned several All-American honors in 2009.

== Head coaches ==
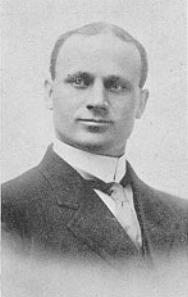
Harvey Holmes, coach (1909–14)

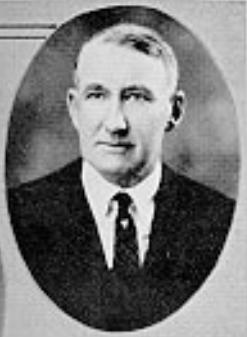
Ralph Hutchinson, coach (1920–27)

Coach	Years	Seasons	Record	Pct.	Conference championships	Playoff app.	National titles
Herbert Cheney	1902–1903	2	5–1–1	.786	0		0
Charles Rowe	1904	1	1–3	.250	0		0
Hubert Upjohn	1905–1906	2	3–2–3	.563	0		0
John Morris	1907–1908	2	8–5	.615	0		0
Harvey Holmes	1909–1914	6	28–10	.737	0		0
Reuben Bronson (a)	1915–1916	2	9–5	.643	0		0
John A. Fogt	1917	1	2–2	.500	0		0
Reuben Bronson (b)	1919	1	2–2–1	.500	0		0
Ralph Hutchinson	1920–1927	8	25–24–2	.510	0		0
Felix Plastino	1928–1934	7	34–16–3	.670	0		0
Guy Wicks	1935–1940	6	29–17–1	.628	0		0
John Vesser	1941–1951	9†	41–27–6	.595	0		0
Babe Caccia	1952–1965	14	79–38–2	.664	6 (1952, 1953, 1955, 1957, 1959, 1963)		0
Leo McKillip	1966–1967	2	4–15	.211	0		0
Ed Cavanaugh	1968–1971	4	28–19	.596	0		0
Bob Griffin	1972–1975	4	21–20	.512	0		0
Joe Pascale	1976	1	1–9	.100	0		0
Bud Hake	1977–1979	3	5–27	.156	0	0	0
Dave Kragthorpe	1980–1982	3	21–14	.600	1 (1981)	1 (1981)	1 (1981)
Jim Koetter	1983–1987	5	23–32–1	.411	0	1 (1983)	0
Garth Hall	1988–1991	4	9–33–1	.214	0	0	0
Brian McNeely	1992–1996	5	21–34	.382	0	0	0
Tom Walsh	1997–1998	2	6–16	.261	0	0	0
Larry Lewis	1999–2006	8	40–49	.449	1 (2002)	0	0
John Zamberlin	2007–2010	4	6–39	.133	0	0	0
Mike Kramer	2011–2016	6	18–50	.265	0	0	0
Rob Phenicie	2017–2021	5	16–35	.314	0	0	0
Charlie Ragle	2022	1	1–10	.091	0	0	0
Cody Hawkins	2023–present	4	20–25	.444	0	0	0

† The program did not field a team during 1943 and 1945.

Several head coaches have been inducted to the university's athletic hall of fame:

- Ralph Hutchinson – football (as player), basketball (as player), baseball (as coach)
- Felix Plastino – football (as player)
- Guy Wicks – football (as coach), basketball (as coach)
- John Vesser – football (as coach), athletic director
- Babe Caccia – football (as player), wrestling (as player)
- Jim Koetter – football (as player), track & field (as player)

== Facilities ==
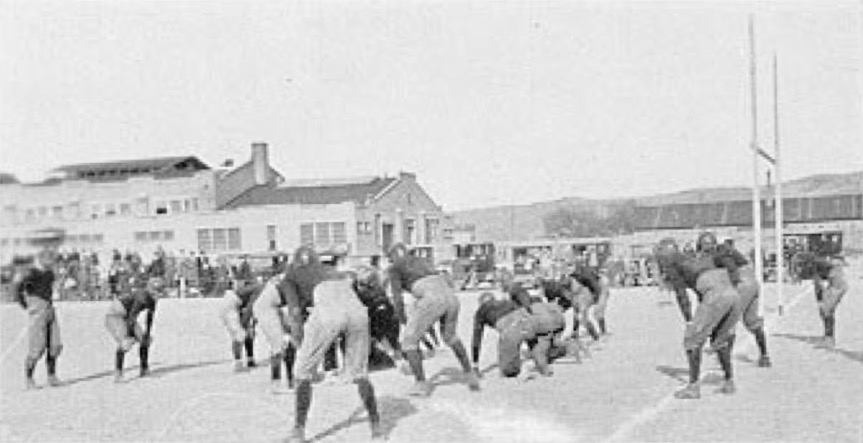
Hutchinson Field, circa 1924

Detail about the team's early facilities is lacking. Before the 1922 season, there was a shared athletic field used by the football, baseball, and track programs, with "practically no provision for the comfort of spectators."

=== Hutchinson Field ===
On November 4, 1922, the football team played its first game on Hutchinson Field, named after head coach Ralph Hutchinson. There were separate football and baseball fields, surrounded by a quarter-mile track, and provisions for bleachers to hold 5000 spectators along with automobile parking. This field was used until partway through the 1936 season. The area is now the Hutchinson Memorial Quadrangle (located at 42.861°N 112.434°W).

=== Spud Bowl ===
Hutchinson Field was replaced by an outdoor stadium in 1936. The first game held there was a 19–32 loss to the Montana State Bobcats on November 11, 1936. Newspaper reports indicate the stadium was named the "Spud Bowl" during the 1946 season. It remained the team's home field through the 1969 season. At the south end of campus, the former Spud Bowl is now Davis Field (named for William E. Davis and located at 42.859°N 112.431°W), which continues as the home venue for outdoor track and field and soccer.

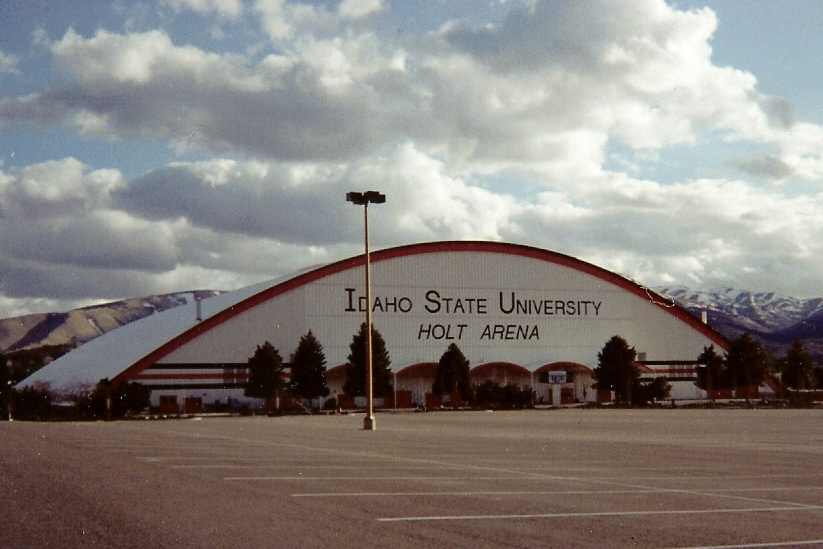
The ICCU Dome in 2008 (under the former Holt Arena name.)

=== ICCU Dome ===
The team's current home venue is an indoor arena that was conceived by ISU athletic director Milton W. "Dubby" Holt in 1966. ISU students voted to appropriate not more than $2.8 million to the project two years later. Originally named the ASISU MiniDome, it was renamed Holt Arena in 1988 to honor Holt. The arena replaced the Spud Bowl as the Bengals' home football stadium in 1970.

The arena is an indoor multi-purpose athletic stadium located on the north end of the ISU campus. Completed in September 1970, it is the oldest enclosed stadium on a college campus in the United States and the second-oldest overall. Only the Astrodome in Houston, completed in 1965, predates it.

== Rivalries ==
=== Boise State ===
Games played	ISU wins	ISU losses	Win%	First meeting	Last meeting	Next scheduled meeting
31	6	25	.194	L 20–27 (1968)	L 52–0 (2015)	September 7, 2030

Boise State joined the Big Sky conference in the 1970 season, the two teams first playing each other two seasons earlier in a loss for the Bengals. Boise State won twelve of the first thirteen games in the series, though Idaho State were able to remain somewhat competitive throughout the 1980s and early 1990s, winning five of fourteen games played between 1981 and 1994. In the 1996 season, Boise State, along with Idaho, moved to the Football Bowl Subdivision, leaving Idaho State without an intrastate rival until Idaho rejoined the Big Sky Conference in 2018. Idaho State has played Boise State three times since the move, all of which were Bronco victories by wide margins. A future game is scheduled for September 7, 2030.

=== Idaho ===
Games played	ISU wins	ISU losses	Win%	First meeting	Last meeting	Next scheduled meeting
47	14	33	.298	L 0–32 (1916)	W 37–16 (2025)	November 21, 2026

Idaho State and Idaho have a rivalry that can be traced to 1916, when they played their first game against each other, with Idaho winning, 32–0. They have played 47 rivalry games since then. Idaho won the first 8 games in the series, with Idaho State winning their first game in 1969. The rivalry remained competitive throughout the 1970s and 1980s, neither team three-peating throughout that period. In 1996, Idaho moved up to Division I-A, now the Football Bowl Subdivision (FBS), and the rivalry halted. The two schools played each other only 4 times during Idaho's stay in the FBS, Idaho winning all of them. In 2018, Idaho moved back down to Division I Football Championship Subdivision (FCS), and rejoined the Big Sky Conference. Idaho leads the series 5–3 since rejoining the conference.

With Idaho's rejoining of the Big Sky Conference in 2018, Idaho Central Credit Union sponsored a rivalry series titled "Battle of the Domes", which was applied to multiple sports. Idaho State was the first of the pair to play its home games indoors, opening the ICCU Dome (originally ASISU Minidome, later Holt Arena) in 1970. The Kibbie Dome in Moscow was enclosed in 1975, after four years as an outdoor venue; the last two outdoor games in this series were played there in 1971 and 1973, then known as new Idaho Stadium.

Ahead of the 2023 season, the Battle of the Domes branding was retired after Idaho Central Credit Union adjusted its sponsorship with both institutions. A temporary trophy was created by Idaho head coach Jason Eck, who fashioned a Mr. Potato Head to the base of the original Battle of the Domes trophy. In 2024, the rivalry's new trophy was officially introduced, a large potato carved out of douglas fir alongside a metal cutout of Idaho, dubbed the Potato State Trophy. Idaho won first possession of the trophy after defeating Idaho State 40–17 in the 2024 season. The following year, Idaho State defeated Idaho at the Kibbie Dome by a score of 37–16, ending a four-game losing streak against Idaho and earning their first possession of the trophy.

=== Portland State ===
Games played	ISU wins	ISU losses	Win%	First meeting	Last meeting	Next scheduled meeting
48	28	20	.583	W 27–7 (1965)	W38–8 (2026)	TBD

Portland State first joined the Big Sky Conference in 1996, and have played Idaho State a total of 47 times. Before Portland State joined the conference, the two teams competed 21 times in non-conference play, the first being a 27–7 home win by Idaho State. In 2011, the Big Sky Conference released its football schedules for the 2012–2015 seasons, which assigned each team two protected opponents that they would play on a yearly basis, with Portland State and Idaho State being assigned to each other.

Ahead of the 2022 season, the protected matchups assigned to each team were changed, with Idaho and Weber State now being Idaho State's annual guaranteed matchups. As a result, Idaho State and Portland State now play each other twice every three years under the current rotation.

=== Weber State ===
Games played	ISU wins	ISU losses	Win%	First meeting	Last meeting	Next scheduled meeting
67	17	50	.254	W 42–20 (1962)	L 27–20 (2025)	September 25, 2027

Weber State, based in nearby Ogden, Utah first played Idaho State in October 1962, a Bengal victory. Weber State is Idaho State's most played rival, as they have played each other annually since both joined the Big Sky Conference as charter members in July 1963. Weber State leads the series and have won twelve of the last fifteen matchups.

In the 2024 season, the "Train Bell Trophy", a rivalry trophy between the two schools, was reintroduced, having not been used since the 1970s. The trophy was named due to the two city's connection by railroad. Idaho State won the first game in the new trophy series 43–35 at Ogden, their first away win against Weber State since 1984.

== All-time record vs. Big Sky teams ==
As September 26, 2026, ISU has the following records against other Big Sky teams.

Opponent	Won	Lost	Tied	Percentage	Streak	First	Last
Idaho	14	33	0	.289	Won 1	1916	2025
Weber State	17	50	0	.258	Lost 1	1962	2026
Portland State	28	20	0	.583	Won 1	1965	2026
Eastern Washington	10	31	0	.244	Lost 1	1947	2024
UC Davis	2	7	0	.125	Won 1	2012	2025
Cal Poly	41	32	0	.562	Lost 1	1937	2026
Montana	14	49	0	.230	Lost 16	1921	2025
Montana State	31	42	0	.436	Lost 3	1923	2026
Northern Arizona	17	37	0	.327	Lost 5	1952	2026
Northern Colorado	23	12	0	.636	Won 2	1939	2025
Southern Utah	13	8	1	.591	Won 1	1989	2026
Utah Tech	2	0	0	1.000	Won 2	2013	2026
Totals	210	318	1	.398			

== Idaho State players in the NFL ==
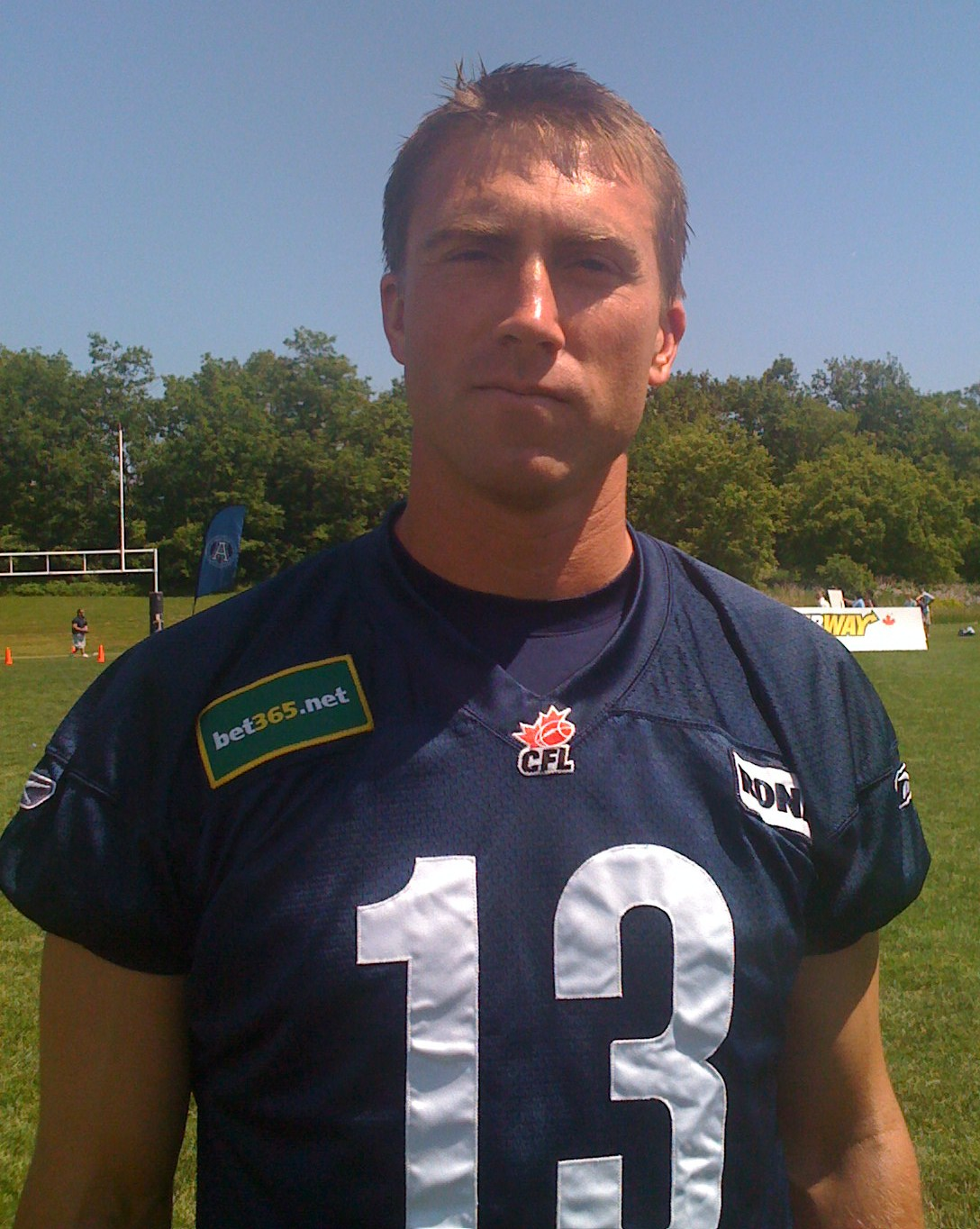
Punter Eddie Johnson

- DE - Jeff Charleston (2006–2012); Super Bowl XLIV champion, First-team All-Big sky, Big Sky newcomer of the year, Big Sky co-defensive P.O.Y.
- DE - Jared Allen (2004–2015); 4 time first team All-Pro, 5 time Pro Bowl, 2 time NFL sacks leader, winner of the Buck Buchanan Award, Pro Football Hall of Fame inductee
- RB - Merrill Hoge (1987–1994)
- C - Evan Dietrich-Smith (2009–2018); Super Bowl XLV champion
- WR - Eddie Bell (1970–1976)
- QB - Mike Machurek (1982–1984); Division 1-AA National champion, AP All-American, All-Big Sky
- C - Will Grant (1978–1987)
- TE - Mike Hancock (1973–1974)
- P - Eddie Johnson (2003–2008)
- DE - Bob Otto (1985–1987); Second-team All-Big Sky
- OL - John Roman (1976–1982)
- LB - Tom Toner (1973–1977); Idaho State Sports Hall of Fame
- T - Brian Vertefeuille (1974)
- S - Jim Wagstaff (1958–1962); Second-team All-AFL, All-RMC
- P - Case deBruijn (1982)
- TE - Josh Hill
- TE - Tanner Conner

== Notable games ==
Utah Aggies 136, Idaho Tech 0, on October 11, 1919: Idaho State (then known as Idaho Technical Institute) lost to Utah State (then known as Utah Agricultural College) by a score of 136–0.

Idaho 1, Idaho State 0, on November 11, 1978: In the conference finale for both teams in 1978, a night game was scheduled in Moscow, Idaho. ISU planned to fly up to the Palouse that afternoon in two vintage airplanes. One developed engine trouble shortly after takeoff from Pocatello and returned. Both teams were at the bottom of the Big Sky standings and the game was not rescheduled; Idaho was granted a 1–0 forfeit win.

Idaho State 34, Eastern Kentucky 23, on December 19, 1981: In the 1981 season, Idaho State were ranked at the top of the Big Sky standings, and appeared in the Division I-AA playoffs for the first time in program history, ranked #2 in the nation. Idaho State defeated Rhode Island and South Carolina State in the playoffs on their way to the title game, then known as the Pioneer Bowl. Coach Dave Kragthorpe led the Bengals to an 11-point victory and the national title.

Idaho State 30, Nevada 28, on September 16, 2017: Idaho State had lost each of their prior 10 games against Nevada, and were 33.5 point underdogs against them. However, the Bengals were able to pull off an upset, beating Nevada, 30–28. Nevada scored 14 points in the fourth quarter, but failed to defeat Idaho State. This was the first time Idaho State had beaten a school in the Football Bowl Subdivision (FBS) since defeating Utah State in 2000.

== Future non-conference opponents ==
Announced schedules as of June 29, 2026.

2026	2027	2028	2029	2030	2031	2032
VMI	at Nevada	at Wyoming	San Diego	Houston Christian	North Dakota	at Arizona State
at Utah State	Central Arkansas	Southern Utah	at BYU	at Boise State	at Utah State	
San Diego		at San Diego	at North Dakota		at Southern Utah	

== See also ==
- Idaho State Bengals football players, a list of notable players for the team
