= Felix Plastino =

American football player and coach (1895–1957)

- Plastino, circa 1930

Biographical details
- Born: June 25, 1895; Provo, Utah, U.S.
- Died: November 25, 1957 (aged 62); Vienna, Virginia, U.S.
- Education: University of Idaho

Playing career

Football
- c. 1915: Idaho Technical
- 1917 1919–1920 (Note: Idaho's football media guide lists Plastino as a letterman for 1917–1921.): Idaho
- Position: Center

Coaching career (HC unless noted)

Football
- 1928–1934: Idaho–Southern Branch

Head coaching record
- Overall: 34–16–3

Felix Anthony Plastino (June 25, 1895 – November 25, 1957) was an American player and coach of college football. He was head coach at the University of Idaho–Southern Branch (now Idaho State University) in Pocatello from 1928 to 1934.

== Early years ==
Born in 1895 in Provo, Utah, Plastino first played college football at Idaho Technical Institute (Note: Idaho Technical Institute and Idaho Southern Branch were early names for Idaho State University.) in Pocatello, Idaho. He served in the United States Army during World War I. Following his military service, Plastino resumed his college football career at the University of Idaho in Moscow, where he was elected team captain in 1920.

== Coaching ==
In June 1928, Plastino was named to succeed Ralph Hutchinson as head coach of the Idaho Southern Branch football team. In seven seasons, he led the program to a record of 34–16–3 (.670).

== After coaching ==
Later in life, Plastino was active in politics in the Democratic Party of Jerome County, Idaho. He also had an Army intelligence role in Washington, D.C. He died in Vienna, Virginia, in 1957 and was survived by his wife and five children. In 1979, Plastino was inducted to the athletic hall of fame at Idaho State University.

== Head coaching record ==
=== College football ===
Year	Team	Overall	Conference	Standing	Bowl/playoffs
Idaho Southern Branch Bengals (Independent) (1928–1934)
1928	Idaho Southern Branch	5–1–1			
1929	Idaho Southern Branch	6–4			
1930	Idaho Southern Branch	4–3			
1931	Idaho Southern Branch	7–1			
1932	Idaho Southern Branch	3–4–1			
1933	Idaho Southern Branch	5–1			
1934	Idaho Southern Branch	4–2–1			
Idaho Southern Branch:		34–16–3			
Total:		34–16–3			
