= Bill Hayes (American football) =

American football player, coach, and administrator (born 1943)

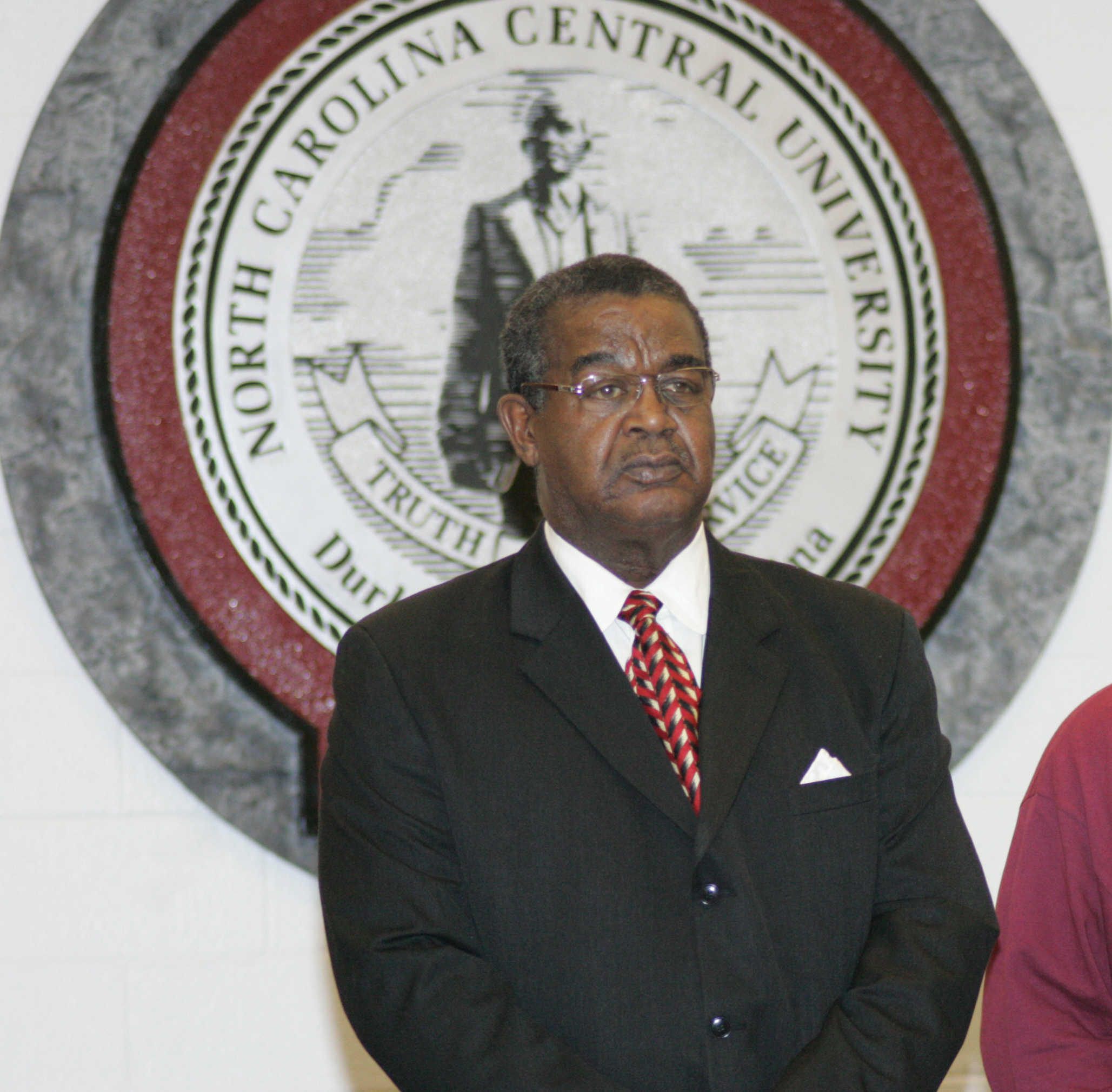
- Hayes as North Carolina Central athletics director

Biographical details
- Born: June 1, 1943 (age 83); Durham, North Carolina, U.S.

Playing career
- 1961–1964: North Carolina Central

Coaching career (HC unless noted)
- 1973–1975: Wake Forest (RB)
- 1976–1987: Winston-Salem State
- 1988–2002: North Carolina A&T

Administrative career (AD unless noted)
- 2003–2007: North Carolina Central
- 2007–2009: Florida A&M
- 2010–2014: Winston-Salem State

Head coaching record
- Overall: 195–104–2
- Bowls: 0–1
- Tournaments: 1–2 (NCAA D-II playoffs); 1–2 (NCAA D-I-AA playoffs)

Accomplishments and honors

Championships
- 2 Black college football national (1990, 1999); 3 CIAA (1977–1978, 1987); 3 MEAC (1991–1992, 1999); 5 CIAA Southern Division (1983–1987)

Awards
- 2× MEAC Coach of the Year (1991, 1999); North Carolina Central University Athletic Hall of Fame; Winston-Salem State University Clarence Athletic Hall of Fame; North Carolina A&T State University Sports Hall of Fame; CIAA Hall of Fame; North Carolina Sports Hall of Fame

William Hayes (born June 1, 1943) is an American former football coach and college athletics administrator. He retired as the athletic director at Winston-Salem State University in 2014. Hayes served as the head football coach at Winston-Salem State from 1976 to 1987 and at North Carolina A&T State University from 1988 to 2003, compiling a career college football record of 195–104–2. In 27 seasons as a head coach, Hayes has the distinction of being the winningest coach at both football programs. He is an alumnus of North Carolina Central University.

== Coaching career ==
Hayes started his coaching career as a running backs coach on the coaching staff at Wake Forest University, from 1973 to 1975, making him one of the first African-American coaches in the Atlantic Coast Conference. At the Division II level at Winston-Salem State, the Rams under Hayes won three Central Intercollegiate Athletic Association (CIAA) titles, and made two Division II playoff appearances, in 1978 and 1987. At North Carolina A&T on the Division I-AA level, the Aggies under Hayes won three Mid-Eastern Athletic Conference (MEAC) titles and made two Division I-AA playoff appearances, in 1992 and 1999. The Aggies also appeared in the now defunct post-season HBCU bowl game, the Heritage Bowl in 1991.

Hayes coached a number of players who went to play in the NFL or CFL: Timmy Newsome (running back), Donald Evans (defensive end), and Anthony Blaylock (defensive back) from Winston-Salem State, and Jamain Stephens (offensive lineman), Curtis Deloatch (defensive back), Maurice Hicks (running back), Michael Basnight (running back), Jamal Jones (wide receiver), Junius Coston (offensive line), Qasim Mitchell (offensive lineman) from North Carolina A&T, Yancey Thigpen (Wide Receiver) from Winston-Salem State.

== Administrative career ==
Hayes became a university administrator after he ended his coaching career. He served as athletic director at his alma mater, North Carolina Central University in Durham, North Carolina, from 2003 to 2007, Florida A&M University in Tallahassee, Florida from December 2007 to December 2009, and Winston-Salem State University from 2010 to 2014.

== Head coaching record ==
Year	Team	Overall	Conference	Standing	Bowl/playoffs
Winston-Salem State Rams (Central Intercollegiate Athletic Association) (1976–1987)
1976	Winston-Salem State	4–6	4–4	T–5th	
1977	Winston-Salem State	11–1	8–0	1st	L Gold Bowl
1978	Winston-Salem State	11–1	8–0	1st	L NCAA Division II Semifinal
1979	Winston-Salem State	8–2–1	6–1–1	T–2nd	
1980	Winston-Salem State	5–5	5–2	T–3rd	
1981	Winston-Salem State	5–5	4–3	2nd (Southern)	
1982	Winston-Salem State	3–7	2–5	T–4th (Southern)	
1983	Winston-Salem State	8–2–1	6–0–1	1st (Southern)	
1984	Winston-Salem State	9–2	7–0	1st (Southern)	
1985	Winston-Salem State	9–2	7–1	1st (Southern)	
1986	Winston-Salem State	7–4	7–0	1st (Southern)	
1987	Winston-Salem State	9–3	8–0	1st (Southern)	L NCAA Division II Quarterfinal
Winston-Salem State:		89–40–2	72–16–2		
North Carolina A&T Aggies (Mid-Eastern Athletic Conference) (1988–2002)
1988	North Carolina A&T	2–9	2–4	T–5th	
1989	North Carolina A&T	5–6	2–4	6th	
1990	North Carolina A&T	9–2	5–1	2nd	
1991	North Carolina A&T	9–3	5–1	T–1st	
1992	North Carolina A&T	9–3	5–1	1st	L NCAA Division I-AA First Round
1993	North Carolina A&T	8–3	3–3	T–4th	
1994	North Carolina A&T	6–5	3–3	T–3rd	
1995	North Carolina A&T	4–7	2–4	T–4th	
1996	North Carolina A&T	8–3	4–3	T–3rd	
1997	North Carolina A&T	7–4	3–4	5th	
1998	North Carolina A&T	8–3	5–3	T–4th	
1999	North Carolina A&T	11–2	8–0	1st	L NCAA Division I-AA Quarterfinal
2000	North Carolina A&T	8–3	6–2	T–2nd	
2001	North Carolina A&T	8–3	5–3	T–3rd	
2002	North Carolina A&T	4–8	2–6	T–7th	
North Carolina A&T:		106–64	60–42		
Total:		195–104–2			
National championship Conference title Conference division title or championship game berth
