= 1992 Eastern Illinois Panthers football team =

American college football season

1992 Eastern Illinois Panthers football
- Conference: Gateway Football Conference
- Record: 5–6 (2–4 GFC)
- Head coach: Bob Spoo (6th season)
- Offensive coordinator: Roy Wittke (3rd season)
- Home stadium: O'Brien Stadium

1992 Gateway Football Conference standings
	Conf.					Overall
Team	W		L		T	W		L		T
No. 3 Northern Iowa $^	5	–	1	–	0	12	–	2	–	0
No. 20 Western Illinois	4	–	2	–	0	7	–	4	–	0
Southwest Missouri State	4	–	2	–	0	6	–	5	–	0
Eastern Illinois	2	–	4	–	0	5	–	6	–	0
Illinois State	2	–	4	–	0	5	–	6	–	0
Indiana State	2	–	4	–	0	4	–	7	–	0
Southern Illinois	2	–	4	–	0	4	–	7	–	0
$ – Conference champion; ^ – NCAA Division I-AA playoff participant; Rankings from NCAA Division I-AA Football Committee poll

The 1992 Eastern Illinois Panthers football team represented Eastern Illinois University during the 1992 NCAA Division I-AA football season. The Panthers played their home games at O'Brien Stadium in Charleston, Illinois.

== Schedule ==
Date	Time	Opponent	Site	Result	Attendance	Source
September 5		at Austin Peay*	Municipal Stadium; Clarksville, TN	W 14–9		
September 12	6:00 p.m.	at No. 1 Marshall*	Marshall University Stadium; Huntington, WV	L 28–63	25,556	
September 19		Murray State*	O'Brien Stadium; Charleston, IL	W 48–9		
September 26		at Illinois State	Hancock Stadium; Normal, IL (rivalry)	L 7–48		
October 3		Southern Illinois	O'Brien Stadium; Charleston, IL	L 46–47	6,018	
October 10		Indiana State	O'Brien Stadium; Charleston, IL	W 31–28	8,520	
October 17		at Western Illinois	Hanson Field; Macomb, IL	L 24–28		
October 24		at No. 14 Southwest Missouri State	Plaster Sports Complex; Springfield, MO	L 10–13		
October 31		at No. 11 Youngstown State*	Stambaugh Stadium; Youngstown, OH	L 19–28		
November 7	1:30 p.m.	No. 1 Northern Iowa	O'Brien Stadium; Charleston, IL	W 21–15	8,948	
November 14		Western Kentucky*	O'Brien Stadium; Charleston, IL	W 28–7	2,003	
*Non-conference game; Rankings from NCAA Division I-AA Football Committee Poll released prior to the game; All times are in Central time
