= 1992 Troy State Trojans football team =

American college football season

1992 Troy State Trojans football
- Conference: Independent
- Record: 10–1
- Head coach: Larry Blakeney (2nd season)
- Offensive coordinator: Don Jacobs (2nd season)
- Defensive coordinator: Johnny Williams (5th season)
- Home stadium: Veterans Memorial Stadium

1992 NCAA Division II independents football records
	Conf.			Overall
Team	W	L	T	W		L		T
No. 5 New Haven ^		–		12	–	1	–	0
Troy State		–		10	–	1	–	0
Michigan Tech		–		9	–	1	–	0
Southern Connecticut State		–		6	–	4	–	0
Saint Mary's		–		5	–	4	–	0
Wayne State (NE)		–		5	–	4	–	1
Wofford		–		6	–	5	–	0
American International		–		4	–	6	–	0
Kentucky State		–		4	–	7	–	0
Springfield		–		3	–	6	–	0
Central Connecticut		–		1	–	8	–	0
Lees–McRae		–		1	–	9	–	0
West Texas State		–		1	–	9	–	0
Northwood		–		0	–	9	–	0
^ – NCAA Division II playoff participant; Rankings from NCAA Division II Football Committee poll

The 1992 Troy State Trojans football team represented Troy State University—now known as Troy University—as an independent during the 1992 NCAA Division II football season. Led by second-year head coach Larry Blakeney, the Trojan compiled a record of 10–1. Troy State played home games at Veterans Memorial Stadium in Troy, Alabama.

This a transitional season for Troy State, as they were moving from NCAA Division II to the NCAA's Division I-AA. Despite the successful record, the Trojans were unranked. They were also ineligible to compete in postseason playoffs.

== Schedule ==
Date	Opponent	Site	Result	Attendance	Source
September 5	at Southern Illinois	McAndrew Stadium; Carbondale, IL	W 37–13	7,000	
September 12	Northwestern State	Veterans Memorial Stadium; Troy, AL	W 38–19	7,200	
September 19	at UCF	Florida Citrus Bowl; Orlando, FL	W 20–16	7,755	
September 26	No. 18 Alabama State	Veterans Memorial Stadium; Troy, AL	W 31–14	15,000	
October 3	Valdosta State	Veterans Memorial Stadium; Troy, AL	W 26–10	4,000	
October 10	at Arkansas State	Indian Stadium; Jonesboro, AR	W 41–7	7,500	
October 17	at Liberty	Liberty University Stadium; Lynchburg, VA	L 7–9	3,000	
October 24	at No. 20 (D-II) North Alabama	Braly Municipal Stadium; Florence, AL	W 24–10	6,117	
November 7	No. 8 Samford^{†}	Veterans Memorial Stadium; Troy, AL	W 29–24	15,000	
November 14	No. 14 Georgia Southern	Paulson Stadium; Statesboro, GA	W 21–0	15,665	
November 21	at Nicholls State	Guidry Stadium; Thibodaux, LA	W 21–0	2,005	
^{†}Homecoming; Rankings from The Sports Network Poll released prior to the game
