= Steve Wilson (defensive back) =

American football player and coach (born 1957)

No. 81, 45
- Positions: Defensive back, Wide receiver

Personal information
- Born: August 24, 1957 (age 69); Los Angeles, California, U.S.
- Listed height: 5 ft 10 in (1.78 m)
- Listed weight: 195 lb (88 kg)

Career information
- High school: Northern (Durham, North Carolina)
- College: Howard
- NFL draft: 1979: undrafted

Career history

Playing
- Dallas Cowboys (1979–1981); Denver Broncos (1982–1988)

Coaching
- Howard (1989–2001) Head coach; Bowie State (2001–2003) Defensive coordinator; Texas Southern (2004–2007) Head coach; DC Defenders (2020) Assistant defensive backs/special teams

Awards and highlights
- All-MEAC (1978); 2× MEAC Coach of the Year (1989, 1993)

Career NFL statistics
- Games played–started: 140–33
- Interceptions: 22
- Stats at Pro Football Reference

Steven Anthony Wilson (born August 24, 1957) is an American former professional football player who was a defensive back in the National Football League (NFL) for the Dallas Cowboys and Denver Broncos. He played college football for the Howard Bison. Wilson was most recently the assistant defensive backs/special teams coach for the DC Defenders of the XFL. He was the former head football coach at his alma mater Howard University, from 1989 to 2001, and Texas Southern University, from 2004 to 2007.

== Early life ==
Wilson attended Northern High School where he played defensive back and wide receiver. He was invited to the North-South Senior All-Star Game as a senior.

He accepted a scholarship to play for Howard University, where he focused on playing wide receiver. As a senior, he set single-season school records for catches (94), receiving yards (1,339), touchdown receptions (12) and kickoff returns (40). He graduated as the school's all-time leading receiver and kick returner.

In 2013, he was inducted into the Mid-Eastern Athletic Conference hall of fame. In 2012, he received MEAC/SWAC Challenge Legend honors. He also was inducted into the Black College Hall of Fame.

== Professional career ==
=== Dallas Cowboys ===
Wilson was not selected in the 1979 NFL draft and was signed as an undrafted free agent by the Dallas Cowboys. Although he was initially waived on August 14, he was re-signed on August 29 for depth purposes, after Butch Johnson was injured. He led the team in punt returns as a rookie.

He was converted into a cornerback in his second season, with 11 starts, 48 tackles, 4 interceptions and 41 passes defensed (led the team).

In 1981, he started 4 games before being replaced with rookie Everson Walls, who received Pro Bowl honors at the end of the season. In 1982, he was moved back to wide receiver before being released on September 3.

=== Denver Broncos ===
Wilson signed as a free agent with the Denver Broncos on September 14, 1982, after Steve Foley broke his arm in the first game of the season.

In 1983, he started 3 games after injuries to Foley and Dennis Smith, forced the team to make changes in the defensive backfield. In 1985, he started four of the first five games because of injuries and finished with 3 interceptions, 12 passes defensed and a fumble recovery.

In 1987, he started at right cornerback the last 5 regular season games and all the playoff games, including Super Bowl XXII. He was waived on August, 29, 1988, only to be re-signed on September 28, after the team experienced a rash of injuries.

During his time with the Broncos he was a dependable player (missing 4 games) and although he was used primarily as a backup, he was always among the team leaders in interceptions, finishing his career ranked ninth (16) in franchise history.

== Coaching career ==
Wilson led the Howard Bison football team to the Mideastern Athletic Conference and Black College National championship twice (1993, 1996). His 1993 team had an 11-0 record and qualified for the school's first Division I-AA (now FCS) playoff appearance. His coaching record was 78 wins, 67 losses and received MEAC Coach of the Year honors twice (1989, 1993).

He spent three seasons as the defensive coordinator for Bowie State University. In 2004, he was hired as the head coach of Texas Southern. His coaching record was 4 wins, 40 losses.

In 2019, he was named the special teams coordinator and defensive backs coach for the DC Defenders of the XFL.

== Personal life ==
Wilson's father, Tommy Wilson, played eight seasons in the National Football League (NFL) and was a Pro Bowl player.

== Head coaching record ==
Year	Team	Overall	Conference	Standing	Bowl/playoffs	TSN^{#}
Howard Bison (Mid-Eastern Athletic Conference) (1989–2001)
1989	Howard	8–3	4–2	2nd		
1990	Howard	6–5	3–3	4th		
1991	Howard	2–9	1–5	T–6th		
1992	Howard	7–4	3–3	T–4th		
1993	Howard	11–1	6–0	1st	L NCAA Division I-AA First Round	8
1994	Howard	4–7	1–5	7th		
1995	Howard	6–5	2–4	T–4th		
1996	Howard	10–2	6–1	2nd	W Heritage	20
1997	Howard	7–4	4–3	4th		
1998	Howard	7–4	5–3	T–4th		
1999	Howard	5–6	4–4	T–4th		
2000	Howard	3–8	3–5	6th		
2001	Howard	2–9	1–7	T–8th		
Howard:		78–67	43–45			
Texas Southern Tigers (Southwestern Athletic Conference) (2004–2007)
2004	Texas Southern	0–11	0–7	5th (West)		
2005	Texas Southern	1–10	1–8	5th (West)		
2006	Texas Southern	3–8	3–6	T–3rd (West)		
2007	Texas Southern	0–11	0–9	5th (West)		
Texas Southern:		4–40	4–30			
Total:		82–107				
National championship Conference title Conference division title or championship game berth
