= 1992 Grambling State Tigers football team =

American college football season

1992 Grambling State Tigers football

Black college national champion

Heritage Bowl, W 45–15 vs. Florida A&M
- Conference: Southwestern Athletic Conference
- Record: 10–2 (6–1 SWAC)
- Head coach: Eddie Robinson (50th season)
- Home stadium: Eddie G. Robinson Memorial Stadium

1992 Southwestern Athletic Conference football standings
| | Conf. | | | | | Overall |
| Team | W | | L | | T | W | | L | | T |
|---|---|---|---|---|---|---|---|---|---|---|
| No. 18 Alcorn State $^ | 7 | – | 0 | – | 0 | 7 | – | 4 | – | 0 |
| Grambling State | 6 | – | 1 | – | 0 | 10 | – | 2 | – | 0 |
| Jackson State | 4 | – | 3 | – | 0 | 7 | – | 4 | – | 0 |
| Alabama State | 3 | – | 4 | – | 0 | 5 | – | 6 | – | 0 |
| Southern | 3 | – | 4 | – | 0 | 5 | – | 6 | – | 0 |
| Texas Southern | 3 | – | 4 | – | 0 | 5 | – | 6 | – | 0 |
| Mississippi Valley State | 2 | – | 5 | – | 0 | 4 | – | 5 | – | 0 |
| Prairie View A&M | 0 | – | 7 | – | 0 | 0 | – | 11 | – | 0 |
$ – Conference champion; ^ – NCAA Division I-AA playoff participant; Rankings from NCAA Division I-AA Football Committee poll

The 1992 Grambling State Tigers football team represented Grambling State University as a member of the Southwestern Athletic Conference (SWAC) during the 1992 NCAA Division I-AA football season. Led by 50th-year head coach Eddie Robinson, the Tigers compiled an overall record of 10–2 and a mark of 6–1 in conference play, and finished second in the SWAC. The Tigers also won a black college football national championship after they defeated Florida A&M in the Heritage Bowl 45–15.

== Schedule ==
| Date | Opponent | Site | Result | Attendance | Source |
|---|---|---|---|---|---|
| September 5 | Alcorn State | Eddie G. Robinson Memorial Stadium; Grambling, LA | L 33–35 | 14,455 | |
| September 12 | vs. Virginia Union* | Giants Stadium; East Rutherford, NJ (Whitney Young Memorial Classic) | W 54–6 | 40,848 | |
| September 19 | Tennessee State* | Eddie G. Robinson Memorial Stadium; Grambling, LA | W 38–28 | | |
| September 26 | vs. Delaware State* | Pontiac Silverdome; Pontiac, MI (Motor City Classic) | L 42–45 | 26,000 | |
| October 3 | vs. Prairie View A&M | Cotton Bowl; Dallas, TX (rivalry) | W 63–3 | 54,307 | |
| October 10 | vs. Mississippi Valley State | Soldier Field; Chicago, IL (Chicago Football Classic) | W 49–6 | 43,692 | |
| October 24 | Jackson State | Eddie G. Robinson Memorial Stadium; Grambling, LA | W 34–31 | | |
| October 31 | at Texas Southern | Rice Stadium; Houston, TX | W 24–17 | | |
| November 7 | Alabama State^{†} | Eddie G. Robinson Memorial Stadium; Grambling, LA | W 44–19 | 21,000 | |
| November 14 | at Florida A&M* | Bragg Memorial Stadium; Tallahassee, FL | W 27–10 | 13,007 | |
| November 28 | vs. Southern | Louisiana Superdome; New Orleans, LA (Bayou Classic) | W 30–27 | 73,556 | |
| January 2, 1993 | at Florida A&M* | Bragg Memorial Stadium; Tallahassee, FL (Heritage Bowl) | W 45–15 | 11,273 | |
*Non-conference game; ^{†}Homecoming
