= 1992 Mississippi Valley State Delta Devils football team =

American college football season

1992 Mississippi Valley State Delta Devils football
- Conference: Southwestern Athletic Conference
- Record: 4–5 (2–5 SWAC)
- Head coach: Larry Dorsey (3rd season)
- Home stadium: Magnolia Stadium

1992 Southwestern Athletic Conference football standings
	Conf.					Overall
Team	W		L		T	W		L		T
No. 18 Alcorn State $^	7	–	0	–	0	7	–	4	–	0
Grambling State	6	–	1	–	0	10	–	2	–	0
Jackson State	4	–	3	–	0	7	–	4	–	0
Alabama State	3	–	4	–	0	5	–	6	–	0
Southern	3	–	4	–	0	5	–	6	–	0
Texas Southern	3	–	4	–	0	5	–	6	–	0
Mississippi Valley State	2	–	5	–	0	4	–	5	–	0
Prairie View A&M	0	–	7	–	0	0	–	11	–	0
$ – Conference champion; ^ – NCAA Division I-AA playoff participant; Rankings from NCAA Division I-AA Football Committee poll

The 1992 Mississippi Valley State Delta Devils football team represented Mississippi Valley State University as a member of the Southwestern Athletic Conference (SWAC) during the 1992 NCAA Division I-AA football season. Led by third-year head coach Larry Dorsey, the Delta Devils compiled an overall record of 4–5, with a conference record of 2–5, and finished seventh in the SWAC.

== Schedule ==
Date	Opponent	Site	Result	Attendance	Source
September 12	Lane*	Magnolia Stadium; Itta Bena, MS	W 30–0	3,500	
September 19	at Miles*	Legion Field; Birmingham, AL	W 19–6	6,000	
September 26	at Jackson State	Mississippi Veterans Memorial Stadium; Jackson, MS	L 14–42	40,000	
October 3	at Southern	A. W. Mumford Stadium; Baton Rouge, LA	L 10–13		
October 10	vs. Grambling State	Soldier Field; Chicago, IL (Chicago Football Classic)	L 6–49	43,692	
October 24	at Texas Southern	Robertson Stadium; Houston, TX	W 25–13		
October 31	Prairie View A&M	Magnolia Stadium; Itta Bena, MS	W 35–14		
November 7	Alcorn State	Magnolia Stadium; Itta Bena, MS	L 0–31		
November 14	at Alabama State	Cramton Bowl; Montgomery, AL	L 19–35		
*Non-conference game
