= 1992 Georgia Southern Eagles football team =

American college football season

1992 Georgia Southern Eagles football
- Conference: Independent
- Record: 7–4
- Head coach: Tim Stowers (3rd season)
- Defensive coordinator: Tommy Spangler (3rd season)
- Home stadium: Paulson Stadium

1992 NCAA Division I-AA independents football standings
| | Conf. | | | Overall |
| Team | W | L | T | W | | L | | T |
|---|---|---|---|---|---|---|---|---|
| No. 13 William & Mary | | – | | 9 | – | 2 | – | 0 |
| No. 7 Youngstown State ^ | | – | | 9 | – | 2 | – | 1 |
| No. 9 Samford ^ | | – | | 9 | – | 3 | – | 0 |
| Georgia Southern | | – | | 7 | – | 4 | – | 0 |
| No. 19 Liberty | | – | | 7 | – | 4 | – | 0 |
| UCF | | – | | 6 | – | 4 | – | 0 |
| Northeastern | | – | | 5 | – | 5 | – | 1 |
| Towson State | | – | | 5 | – | 5 | – | 0 |
| Western Kentucky | | – | | 4 | – | 6 | – | 0 |
| James Madison | | – | | 4 | – | 7 | – | 0 |
^ – NCAA Division I-AA playoff participant; Rankings from NCAA Division I-AA Football Committee poll

The 1992 Georgia Southern Eagles football team represented the Georgia Southern Eagles of Georgia Southern University during the 1992 NCAA Division I-AA football season. The Eagles played their home games at Paulson Stadium in Statesboro, Georgia. The team was coached by Tim Stowers, in his third year as head coach for the Eagles. The Eagles were in a transition season from Independent to the Southern Conference during the 1992 season.

== Schedule ==
| Date | Opponent | Rank | Site | TV | Result | Attendance | Source |
|---|---|---|---|---|---|---|---|
| September 5 | No. 16 Florida A&M | | Paulson Stadium; Statesboro, GA | | L 17–28 | 12,708 | |
| September 12 | Valdosta State | | Paulson Stadium; Statesboro, GA | | W 24–13 | 12,586 | |
| September 26 | No. 13 Furman | | Paladin Stadium; Greenville, SC | | W 21–0 | 14,879 | |
| October 3 | No. 8 (D-II) Savannah State | No. T–20 | Paulson Stadium; Statesboro, GA | | W 21–7 | 16,706 | |
| October 10 | at No. 12 (I-A) Georgia | No. 19 | Sanford Stadium; Athens, GA | PPV | L 7–34 | 85,434 | |
| October 17 | James Madison | | Paulson Stadium; Statesboro, GA | | W 24–17 | 13,714 | |
| October 24 | No. 4 (D-II) Jacksonville State | | Paulson Stadium; Statesboro, GA | | W 10–0 | 16,366 | |
| October 31 | No. 4 Middle Tennessee | | Paulson Stadium; Statesboro, GA | | W 13–10 | 14,077 | |
| November 7 | Mississippi College | No. 16 | Paulson Stadium; Statesboro, GA | | W 30–0 | 16,740 | |
| November 14 | Troy State | No. 14 | Paulson Stadium; Statesboro, GA | | L 0–21 | 15,665 | |
| November 21 | at No. 7 Youngstown State | No. T–20 | Stambaugh Stadium; Youngstown, OH | | L 10–21 | 8,984 | |
Rankings from NCAA Division I-AA Football Committee Poll released prior to the game
