= 1992 Illinois State Redbirds football team =

American college football season

1992 Illinois State Redbirds football
- Conference: Gateway Football Conference
- Record: 5–6 (2–4 GFC)
- Head coach: Jim Heacock (5th season)
- Home stadium: Hancock Stadium

1992 Gateway Football Conference standings
	Conf.					Overall
Team	W		L		T	W		L		T
No. 3 Northern Iowa $^	5	–	1	–	0	12	–	2	–	0
No. 20 Western Illinois	4	–	2	–	0	7	–	4	–	0
Southwest Missouri State	4	–	2	–	0	6	–	5	–	0
Eastern Illinois	2	–	4	–	0	5	–	6	–	0
Illinois State	2	–	4	–	0	5	–	6	–	0
Indiana State	2	–	4	–	0	4	–	7	–	0
Southern Illinois	2	–	4	–	0	4	–	7	–	0
$ – Conference champion; ^ – NCAA Division I-AA playoff participant; Rankings from NCAA Division I-AA Football Committee poll

The 1992 Illinois State Redbirds football team represented Illinois State University as a member of the Gateway Football Conference (GFC) during the 1992 NCAA Division I-AA football season. In their fifth year under head coach Jim Heacock, the Redbirds compiled an overall record of 5–6, with a mark of 2–4 in conference play, and finished tied for fourth in the GFC. Illinois State played home games at Hancock Stadium in Normal, Illinois.

== Schedule ==
Date	Opponent	Site	Result	Attendance	Source
September 5	Southwest State (MN)*	Hancock Stadium; Normal, IL	W 51–12		
September 12	at Northern Illinois*	Huskie Stadium; DeKalb, IL	L 19–26	13,302	
September 19	at Indiana State	Memorial Stadium; Terre Haute, IN	L 7–12	5,982	
September 26	Eastern Illinois	Hancock Stadium; Normal, IL (rivalry)	W 48–7		
October 3	at No. 2 Northern Iowa	UNI-Dome; Cedar Falls, IA	L 14–41	15,086	
October 10	at No. 7 Youngstown State*	Stambaugh Stadium; Youngstown, OH	L 10–34	11,634	
October 17	No. 18 Southwest Missouri State	Hancock Stadium; Normal, IL	L 21–24	11,288	
October 24	Southern Illinois	Hancock Stadium; Normal, IL	W 35–11	10,349	
October 31	at Western Illinois	Hanson Field; Macomb, IL	L 9–37	4,621	
November 7	Western Kentucky*	Hancock Stadium; Normal, IL	W 23–7	7,907	
November 14	at Southeast Missouri State*	Houck Stadium; Cape Girardeau, MO	W 52–33		
*Non-conference game; Rankings from NCAA Division I-AA Football Committee Poll released prior to the game
