= 1992 Delaware State Hornets football team =

American college football season

1992 Delaware State Hornets football
- Conference: Mid-Eastern Athletic Conference
- Record: 6–5 (3–3 MEAC)
- Head coach: Bill Collick (8th season)
- Home stadium: Alumni Stadium

1992 Mid-Eastern Athletic Conference football standings
	Conf.					Overall
Team	W		L		T	W		L		T
No. 17 North Carolina A&T $^	5	–	1	–	0	9	–	3	–	0
No. 15 Florida A&M	4	–	2	–	0	7	–	4	–	0
South Carolina State	4	–	2	–	0	7	–	4	–	0
Howard	3	–	3	–	0	7	–	4	–	0
Delaware State	3	–	3	–	0	6	–	5	–	0
Bethune–Cookman	2	–	4	–	0	4	–	7	–	0
Morgan State	0	–	6	–	0	2	–	9	–	0
$ – Conference champion; ^ – NCAA Division I-AA playoff participant; Rankings from NCAA Division I-AA Football Committee poll

The 1992 Delaware State Hornets football team represented Delaware State College (now known as Delaware State University) as a member of the Mid-Eastern Athletic Conference (MEAC) during the 1992 NCAA Division I-AA football season. Led by eighth-year head coach Bill Collick, the Hornets compiled an overall record of 6–5, with a mark of 3–3 in conference play, and finished tied for fourth in the MEAC.

== Schedule ==
Date	Opponent	Rank	Site	Result	Attendance	Source
September 5	vs. Cheyney*		Baynard Stadium; Wilmington, DE (Wilmington Classic)	W 54–0	4,127	
September 12	at No. 2 Youngstown State*		Stambaugh Stadium; Youngstown, OH	L 20–42	11,926	
October 19	at Bethune–Cookman		Municipal Stadium; Daytona Beach, FL	W 31–17	2,500	
September 26	vs. Grambling State*		Pontiac Silverdome; Pontiac, MI (Motor City Classic)	W 45–42	26,000	
October 10	Towson State*		Alumni Stadium; Dover, DE	W 27–13		
October 17	No. 9 Florida A&M		Alumni Stadium; Dover, DE	W 22–20	4,783	
October 24	at Morgan State		Hughes Stadium; Baltimore, MD	W 34–16	13,048	
October 31	South Carolina State	No. 17	Alumni Stadium; Dover, DE	L 7–28	6,349	
November 7	No. 19 North Carolina A&T		Alumni Stadium; Dover, DE	L 10–24		
November 14	at Liberty*		Liberty University Stadium; Lynchburg, VA	L 27–49		
November 21	at Howard		William H. Greene Stadium; Washington, DC	L 28–31		
*Non-conference game; Rankings from NCAA Division I-AA Football Committee Poll released prior to the game
