= 1992 South Carolina State Bulldogs football team =

American college football season

1992 South Carolina State Bulldogs football
- Conference: Mid-Eastern Athletic Conference
- Record: 7–4 (4–2 MEAC)
- Head coach: Willie Jeffries (10th season)
- Home stadium: Oliver C. Dawson Stadium

1992 Mid-Eastern Athletic Conference football standings
	Conf.					Overall
Team	W		L		T	W		L		T
No. 17 North Carolina A&T $^	5	–	1	–	0	9	–	3	–	0
No. 15 Florida A&M	4	–	2	–	0	7	–	4	–	0
South Carolina State	4	–	2	–	0	7	–	4	–	0
Howard	3	–	3	–	0	7	–	4	–	0
Delaware State	3	–	3	–	0	6	–	5	–	0
Bethune–Cookman	2	–	4	–	0	4	–	7	–	0
Morgan State	0	–	6	–	0	2	–	9	–	0
$ – Conference champion; ^ – NCAA Division I-AA playoff participant; Rankings from NCAA Division I-AA Football Committee poll

The 1992 South Carolina State Bulldogs football team represented South Carolina State University as a member of the Mid-Eastern Athletic Conference (MEAC) during the 1992 NCAA Division I-AA football season. Led by tenth-year head coach Willie Jeffries, the Bulldogs compiled an overall record of 7–4, with a mark of 4–2 in conference play, and finished tied for second in the MEAC.

== Schedule ==
Date	Opponent	Site	Result	Attendance	Source
September 5	at Newberry*	Setzler Field; Newberry, SC	W 42–17	6,143	
September 12	at No. 16 Florida A&M	Bragg Memorial Stadium; Tallahassee, FL	L 20–33		
September 19	vs. Southern*	Georgia Dome; Atlanta, GA (Atlanta Football Classic)	L 18–19	55,296	
October 3	vs. Jackson State*	Williams–Brice Stadium; Columbia, SC (Palmetto Classic)	L 3–41	25,200	
October 10	Morgan State	Oliver C. Dawson Stadium; Orangeburg, SC	W 31–14		
October 17	Bethune–Cookman	Oliver C. Dawson Stadium; Orangeburg, SC	W 35–7		
October 24	North Carolina Central*	Oliver C. Dawson Stadium; Orangeburg, SC	W 69–0	13,733	
October 31	at No. 17 Delaware State	Alumni Stadium; Dover, DE	W 28–7	6,349	
November 7	Howard	Oliver C. Dawson Stadium; Orangeburg, SC	W 28–18		
November 14	vs. Charleston Southern*	Summerville High School; Summerville, SC	W 32–0	8,500	
November 21	at North Carolina A&T	Aggie Stadium; Greensboro, NC (rivalry)	L 21–24		
*Non-conference game; Rankings from NCAA Division I-AA Football Committee Poll released prior to the game
