= Jim Heacock =

American football player and coach (born 1948)

Biographical details
- Born: June 23, 1948 (age 78); Alliance, Ohio, U.S.

Playing career
- 1967–1970: Muskingum

Coaching career (HC unless noted)
- 1971: Marlington HS (OH) (assistant)
- 1972: Bowling Green (GA)
- 1973–1974: Muskingum (DB)
- 1975–1977: Muskingum (DC)
- 1978–1980: Bowling Green (DL)
- 1981–1982: Bowling Green (AHC/DC)
- 1983–1987: Washington (DL)
- 1988–1995: Illinois State
- 1996–2004: Ohio State (DL)
- 2005–2011: Ohio State (DC)

Head coaching record
- Overall: 37–49–2

Accomplishments and honors

Awards
- Broyles Award (2007)

Jim Heacock (born June 23, 1948) is an American former football coach. He served as the head football coach at Illinois State University from 1988 to 1995, compiling a record of 37–49–2. In 1996, he became an assistant coach at Ohio State University and served as the defensive coordinator for the Ohio State Buckeyes from 2005 until his retirement following the 2011 season.

== Coaching career ==
Heacock was an assistant coach at the University of Washington from 1983 to 1987. As the team prepared for its bowl game in 1987, Heacock accepted a job as the head football coach at Illinois State University. At Illinois State, he employed future Ohio State head coach Urban Meyer.

In 1996, Heacock joined Ohio State University's football coaching staff as the defensive line coach. When head coach John Cooper was fired in 2001, Heacock was one of only three assistants retained by the new head coach, Jim Tressel. Heacock won the Broyles Award, awarded to the nation's top assistant coach, in 2007. As of 2008, Heacock was the most senior member of the Ohio State coaching staff. Heacock was promoted to defensive coordinator in 2005. In his first year in that position, the Ohio State defense was ranked first in the nation in rush defense. The same year, the defense ranked fifth in the nation for fewest points allowed and for total defense. According to sportswriter Dennis Dodd, "Statistically, the 2007 unit was among the best finishing first nationally in scoring defense, total defense and pass defense".

Heacock was awarded the Broyles Award in 2007 as the top assistant coach in college football. Tressel remarked that "Heacock's defense has allowed this young Ohio State team to become a national contender." Heacock was more modest, claiming that "We're all just in this for the same reason. ... There are other assistants who do every bit as much as I do. I kind of get in the way."

== Personal life ==
Heacock's brother, Jeff, was the head football coach for Muskingum University from 1981 to 2006.

== Head coaching record ==
| Year | Team | Overall | Conference | Standing | Bowl/playoffs |
|---|---|---|---|---|---|
Illinois State Redbirds (Gateway Football Conference) (1988–1995)
| 1988 | Illinois State | 1–10 | 0–6 | 7th | |
| 1989 | Illinois State | 5–6 | 4–2 | T–2nd | |
| 1990 | Illinois State | 5–6 | 3–3 | T–3rd | |
| 1991 | Illinois State | 5–6 | 1–5 | 7th | |
| 1992 | Illinois State | 5–6 | 2–4 | T–4th | |
| 1993 | Illinois State | 6–4–1 | 2–3–1 | T–4th | |
| 1994 | Illinois State | 5–5–1 | 3–3 | 4th | |
| 1995 | Illinois State | 5–6 | 3–3 | T–3rd | |
| Illinois State: | | 37–49–2 | 18–30–1 | | |
| Total: | | 37–49–2 | | | |
