= 1992 Western Kentucky Hilltoppers football team =

American college football season

1992 Western Kentucky Hilltoppers football
- Conference: Independent
- Record: 4–6
- Head coach: Jack Harbaugh (4th season)
- Captains: Richard Grice; Mark Lamberth
- Home stadium: L. T. Smith Stadium

1992 NCAA Division I-AA independents football standings
	Conf.			Overall
Team	W	L	T	W		L		T
No. 13 William & Mary		–		9	–	2	–	0
No. 7 Youngstown State ^		–		9	–	2	–	1
No. 9 Samford ^		–		9	–	3	–	0
Georgia Southern		–		7	–	4	–	0
No. 19 Liberty		–		7	–	4	–	0
UCF		–		6	–	4	–	0
Northeastern		–		5	–	5	–	1
Towson State		–		5	–	5	–	0
Western Kentucky		–		4	–	6	–	0
James Madison		–		4	–	7	–	0
^ – NCAA Division I-AA playoff participant; Rankings from NCAA Division I-AA Football Committee poll

The 1992 Western Kentucky Hilltoppers football team represented Western Kentucky University as an independent during the 1992 NCAA Division I-AA football season Led by fourth-year head coach Jack Harbaugh, the Hilltoppers compiled a record of 4–6. The team's captains were Richard Grice and Mark Lamberth.

== Schedule ==
Date	Opponent	Site	Result	Attendance	Source
September 5	Eastern Kentucky	L. T. Smith Stadium; Bowling Green, KY (rivalry)	L 7–21	14,101	
September 12	Indiana State	L. T. Smith Stadium; Bowling Green, KY	W 34–14	8,760	
September 19	at Western Illinois	Hanson Field; Macomb, IL	L 30–31	6,230	
September 26	at Southwestern Louisiana	Cajun Field; Lafayette, LA	L 14–17	20,049	
October 10	at No. 1 Northern Iowa	UNI-Dome; Cedar Falls, IA	L 6–34	11,255	
October 24	No. 19 UCF*^{†}	L. T. Smith Stadium; Bowling Green, KY	W 50–36	10,589	
October 29	Southern Illinois	L. T. Smith Stadium; Bowling Green, KY	W 41–39	6,434	
November 7	at Illinois State	Hancock Stadium; Normal, IL	L 7–23	7,907	
November 14	at Eastern Illinois	O'Brien Field; Charleston, IL	L 7–28	2,003	
November 21	at Murray State	Roy Stewart Stadium; Murray, KY (rivalry)	W 47–15	1,403	
*Non-conference game; ^{†}Homecoming; Rankings from NCAA Division I-AA Football Committee Poll released prior to the game
