= 1992 Southern Illinois Salukis football team =

American college football season

1992 Southern Illinois Salukis football
- Conference: Gateway Football Conference
- Record: 4–7 (2–4 GFC)
- Head coach: Bob Smith (4th season)
- Home stadium: McAndrew Stadium

1992 Gateway Football Conference standings
	Conf.					Overall
Team	W		L		T	W		L		T
No. 3 Northern Iowa $^	5	–	1	–	0	12	–	2	–	0
No. 20 Western Illinois	4	–	2	–	0	7	–	4	–	0
Southwest Missouri State	4	–	2	–	0	6	–	5	–	0
Eastern Illinois	2	–	4	–	0	5	–	6	–	0
Illinois State	2	–	4	–	0	5	–	6	–	0
Indiana State	2	–	4	–	0	4	–	7	–	0
Southern Illinois	2	–	4	–	0	4	–	7	–	0
$ – Conference champion; ^ – NCAA Division I-AA playoff participant; Rankings from NCAA Division I-AA Football Committee poll

The 1992 Southern Illinois Salukis football team was an American football team that represented Southern Illinois University (now known as Southern Illinois University Carbondale) in the Gateway Football Conference (GFC) during the 1992 NCAA Division I-AA football season. Under forth-year head coach Bob Smith, the team compiled a 4–7 record (2–4 against conference opponents) and finish last place in the conference. The team played its home games at McAndrew Stadium in Carbondale, Illinois.

On offense, the team set new school records with 56 touchdowns, 36.5 points per game, 295.9 rushing yards per game, and 459.7 yards of total offense per game. The team's statistical leaders included Scott Gabbert with 2,463 passing yards and Anthony Perry with 1,023 rushing yards. Junior Billy Swain set a new school record for career touchdown passes.

== Schedule ==
Date	Opponent	Site	Result	Attendance	Source
September 5	Troy State*	McAndrew Stadium; Carbondale, IL	L 13–37	7,000	
September 12	Southeast Missouri State*	McAndrew Stadium; Carbondale, IL	W 44–35	10,200	
September 19	Austin Peay*	McAndrew Stadium; Carbondale, IL	W 37–7	12,100	
September 26	at Arkansas State*	Indian Stadium; Jonesboro, AR	L 38–42	8,000	
October 3	at Eastern Illinois	McAndrew Stadium; Carbondale, IL	W 47–46	6,018	
October 10	Western Illinois	McAndrew Stadium; Carbondale, IL	L 42–50	13,000	
October 17	No. 1 Northern Iowa	McAndrew Stadium; Carbondale, IL	L 25–30	6,800	
October 24	at Illinois State	Hancock Stadium; Normal, IL	L 11–35	10,349	
October 29	at Western Kentucky*	L. T. Smith Stadium; Bowling Green, KY	L 39–41	6,434	
November 7	at No. 12 Southwest Missouri State	Plaster Sports Complex; Springfield, MO	L 12–51	10,782	
November 21	Indiana State	McAndrew Stadium; Carbondale, IL	W 42–35	1,000	
*Non-conference game; Rankings from NCAA Division I-AA Football Committee Poll released prior to the game
