= 1992 Indiana State Sycamores football team =

American college football season

1992 Indiana State Sycamores football
- Conference: Gateway Football Conference
- Record: 4–7 (2–4 GFC)
- Head coach: Dennis Raetz (13th season)
- Home stadium: Memorial Stadium

1992 Gateway Football Conference standings
	Conf.					Overall
Team	W		L		T	W		L		T
No. 3 Northern Iowa $^	5	–	1	–	0	12	–	2	–	0
No. 20 Western Illinois	4	–	2	–	0	7	–	4	–	0
Southwest Missouri State	4	–	2	–	0	6	–	5	–	0
Eastern Illinois	2	–	4	–	0	5	–	6	–	0
Illinois State	2	–	4	–	0	5	–	6	–	0
Indiana State	2	–	4	–	0	4	–	7	–	0
Southern Illinois	2	–	4	–	0	4	–	7	–	0
$ – Conference champion; ^ – NCAA Division I-AA playoff participant; Rankings from NCAA Division I-AA Football Committee poll

The 1992 Indiana State Sycamores football team represented Indiana State University as a member of the Gateway Football Conference (GFC) during the 1992 NCAA Division I-AA football season. The team was led by 13th-year head coach Dennis Raetz and played their home games at Memorial Stadium in Terre Haute, Indiana. The Sycamores finished the season with a 4–7 record overall and a 2–4 record in conference play.

== Schedule ==
Date	Opponent	Site	Result	Attendance	Source
September 5	at Oklahoma State*	Lewis Field; Stillwater OK	L 3–35	34,068	
September 12	at Western Kentucky*	L. T. Smith Stadium; Bowling Green, KY	L 14–34	8,760	
September 19	Illinois State	Memorial Stadium; Terre Haute, IN	W 12–7	5,982	
September 26	Lock Haven*	Memorial Stadium; Terre Haute, IN	W 66–13	4,021	
October 3	No. 7 Youngstown State*	Memorial Stadium; Terre Haute, IN	L 24–30	4,014	
October 10	at Eastern Illinois	O'Brien Stadium; Charleston, IL	L 28–31	8,520	
October 17	Glenville State*	Memorial Stadium; Terre Haute, IN	W 63–49	4,123	
October 24	at Western Illinois	Hanson Field; Macomb, IL	L 30–42		
October 31	No. 1 Northern Iowa^{†}	Memorial Stadium; Terre Haute, IN	L 13–34	7,729	
November 14	No. 11 Southwest Missouri State	Memorial Stadium; Terre Haute, IN	W 31–28	981	
November 21	at Southern Illinois	McAndrew Stadium; Carbondale, IL	L 35–42	1,000	
*Non-conference game; ^{†}Homecoming; Rankings from NCAA Division I-AA Football Committee Poll released prior to the game
