= 1992 Southern Jaguars football team =

American college football season

1992 Southern Jaguars football
- Conference: Southwestern Athletic Conference
- Record: 5–6 (3–4 SWAC)
- Head coach: Marino Casem (3rd season)
- Defensive coordinator: Sherman Simmons (4th season)
- Home stadium: A. W. Mumford Stadium

1992 Southwestern Athletic Conference football standings
	Conf.					Overall
Team	W		L		T	W		L		T
No. 18 Alcorn State $^	7	–	0	–	0	7	–	4	–	0
Grambling State	6	–	1	–	0	10	–	2	–	0
Jackson State	4	–	3	–	0	7	–	4	–	0
Alabama State	3	–	4	–	0	5	–	6	–	0
Southern	3	–	4	–	0	5	–	6	–	0
Texas Southern	3	–	4	–	0	5	–	6	–	0
Mississippi Valley State	2	–	5	–	0	4	–	5	–	0
Prairie View A&M	0	–	7	–	0	0	–	11	–	0
$ – Conference champion; ^ – NCAA Division I-AA playoff participant; Rankings from NCAA Division I-AA Football Committee poll

The 1992 Southern Jaguars football team represented Southern University as a member of the Southwestern Athletic Conference (SWAC) during the 1992 NCAA Division I-AA football season. Led by third-year head coach Marino Casem, the Jaguars compiled an overall record of 5–6, with a conference record of 3–4, and finished tied for fourth in the SWAC.

== Schedule ==
Date	Opponent	Site	Result	Attendance	Source
September 12	Alabama State	A. W. Mumford Stadium; Baton Rouge, LA	L 10–30		
September 19	vs. South Carolina State*	Georgia Dome; Atlanta, GA (Atlanta Football Classic)	W 19–18	55,296	
October 3	Mississippi Valley State	A. W. Mumford Stadium; Baton Rouge, LA	W 13–10		
October 10	vs. Winston-Salem State*	Independence Stadium; Shreveport, LA (Shreveport Classic)	W 47–14	20,000	
October 17	No. 20 Jackson State	A. W. Mumford Stadium; Baton Rouge, LA (rivalry)	L 24–25	27,237	
October 24	at Alcorn State	Jack Spinks Stadium; Lorman, MS	L 13–35		
October 31	at Nicholls State*	John L. Guidry Stadium; Thibodaux, LA	L 24–27		
November 7	Florida A&M*	A. W. Mumford Stadium; Baton Rouge, LA	L 6–16	13,206	
November 14	Texas Southern	A. W. Mumford Stadium; Baton Rouge, LA	W 34–6		
November 21	at Prairie View A&M	Edward L. Blackshear Field; Prairie View, TX	W 12–7		
November 28	vs. Grambling State	Louisiana Superdome; New Orleans, LA (Bayou Classic)	L 27–30	73,556	
*Non-conference game; Rankings from Coaches' Poll released prior to the game
