= 1992 Bethune–Cookman Wildcats football team =

American college football season

1992 Bethune–Cookman Wildcats football
- Conference: Mid-Eastern Athletic Conference
- Record: 4–7 (2–4 MEAC)
- Head coach: Sylvester Collins (1st season)
- Home stadium: Municipal Stadium

1992 Mid-Eastern Athletic Conference football standings
	Conf.					Overall
Team	W		L		T	W		L		T
No. 17 North Carolina A&T $^	5	–	1	–	0	9	–	3	–	0
No. 15 Florida A&M	4	–	2	–	0	7	–	4	–	0
South Carolina State	4	–	2	–	0	7	–	4	–	0
Howard	3	–	3	–	0	7	–	4	–	0
Delaware State	3	–	3	–	0	6	–	5	–	0
Bethune–Cookman	2	–	4	–	0	4	–	7	–	0
Morgan State	0	–	6	–	0	2	–	9	–	0
$ – Conference champion; ^ – NCAA Division I-AA playoff participant; Rankings from NCAA Division I-AA Football Committee poll

The 1992 Bethune–Cookman Wildcats football team represented Bethune–Cookman College (now known as Bethune–Cookman University) as a member of the Mid-Eastern Athletic Conference (MEAC) during the 1992 NCAA Division I-AA football season. Led by first-year head coach Sylvester Collins, the Wildcats compiled an overall record of 4–7, with a mark of 2–4 in conference play, and finished sixth in the MEAC.

== Schedule ==
Date	Opponent	Site	Result	Attendance	Source
September 5	vs. Savannah State*	Gator Bowl; Jacksonville, FL (Gateway Classic)	L 21–31	5,000	
September 12	at UCF*	Florida Citrus Bowl; Orlando, FL	L 3–28	12,075	
October 19	Delaware State	Municipal Stadium; Daytona Beach, FL	L 17–31	2,500	
September 26	Samford*	Municipal Stadium; Daytona Beach, FL	L 13–42	2,500	
October 10	at Howard	William H. Greene Stadium; Washington, DC	L 7–26		
October 17	at South Carolina State	Oliver C. Dawson Stadium; Orangeburg, SC	L 7–35		
October 24	Albany State*^{†}	Municipal Stadium; Daytona Beach, FL	W 14–7	8,501	
October 31	at No. 18 North Carolina A&T	Aggie Stadium; Greensboro, NC	L 22–30	23,636	
November 14	Norfolk State*	Municipal Stadium; Daytona Beach, FL	W 31–26	4,673	
November 21	at Morgan State	Hughes Stadium; Baltimore, MD	W 1–0 (forfeit win)		
November 28	vs. No. 15 Florida A&M	Tampa Stadium; Tampa, FL (Florida Classic)	W 35–21	40,741	
*Non-conference game; ^{†}Homecoming; Rankings from NCAA Division I-AA Football Committee Poll released prior to the game
