= 1992 Northeastern Huskies football team =

American college football season

1992 Northeastern Huskies football
- Conference: Independent
- Record: 5–5–1
- Head coach: Barry Gallup (2nd season)
- Home stadium: Parsons Field

1992 NCAA Division I-AA independents football standings
	Conf.			Overall
Team	W	L	T	W		L		T
No. 13 William & Mary		–		9	–	2	–	0
No. 7 Youngstown State ^		–		9	–	2	–	1
No. 9 Samford ^		–		9	–	3	–	0
Georgia Southern		–		7	–	4	–	0
No. 19 Liberty		–		7	–	4	–	0
UCF		–		6	–	4	–	0
Northeastern		–		5	–	5	–	1
Towson State		–		5	–	5	–	0
Western Kentucky		–		4	–	6	–	0
James Madison		–		4	–	7	–	0
^ – NCAA Division I-AA playoff participant; Rankings from NCAA Division I-AA Football Committee poll

The 1992 Northeastern Huskies football team was an American football team that represented Northeastern University as an independent during the 1992 NCAA Division I-AA football season. Led by second-year head coach Barry Gallup, the team compiled a 5–5–1 record.

== Schedule ==
Date	Opponent	Site	Result	Attendance	Source
September 12	at Northern Arizona	Walkup Skydome; Flagstaff, AZ	L 14–21	6,377	
September 19	at Maine	Alumni Field; Orono, ME	W 47–36		
September 26	Connecticut	Parsons Field; Brookline, MA	W 16–13		
October 3	at James Madison	Bridgeforth Stadium; Harrisonburg, VA	L 34–35	11,200	
October 10	Lehigh	Parsons Field; Brookline, MA	W 42–28	4,400	
October 17	No. 6 Youngstown State	Parsons Field; Brookline, MA	W 28–23	4,100	
October 24	at New Hampshire	Cowell Stadium; Durham, NH	T 10–10		
October 31	at No. 18 UMass	McGuirk Stadium; Hadley, MA	L 10–22	5,051	
November 7	Rhode Island	Parsons Field; Brookline, MA	W 35–26	6,500	
November 14	at Towson State	Minnegan Stadium; Towson, MD	L 32–33	1,687	
November 21	at Boston University	Nickerson Field; Boston, MA	L 19–25		
Rankings from NCAA Division I-AA Football Committee Poll released prior to the game
