= 1992 Prairie View A&M Panthers football team =

American college football season

1992 Prairie View A&M Panthers football
- Conference: Southwestern Athletic Conference
- Record: 0–11 (0–7 SWAC)
- Head coach: Ronald Beard (2nd season)
- Offensive coordinator: Darwin Valentine (2nd season)
- Defensive coordinator: Douglas Fowlkes (2nd season)
- Home stadium: Edward L. Blackshear Field

1992 Southwestern Athletic Conference football standings
	Conf.					Overall
Team	W		L		T	W		L		T
No. 18 Alcorn State $^	7	–	0	–	0	7	–	4	–	0
Grambling State	6	–	1	–	0	10	–	2	–	0
Jackson State	4	–	3	–	0	7	–	4	–	0
Alabama State	3	–	4	–	0	5	–	6	–	0
Southern	3	–	4	–	0	5	–	6	–	0
Texas Southern	3	–	4	–	0	5	–	6	–	0
Mississippi Valley State	2	–	5	–	0	4	–	5	–	0
Prairie View A&M	0	–	7	–	0	0	–	11	–	0
$ – Conference champion; ^ – NCAA Division I-AA playoff participant; Rankings from NCAA Division I-AA Football Committee poll

The 1992 Prairie View A&M Panthers football team represented Prairie View A&M University as a member of the Southwestern Athletic Conference (SWAC) during the 1992 NCAA Division I-AA football season. Led by second-year head coach Ronald Beard, the Panthers compiled an overall record of 0–11, with a mark of 0–7 in conference play, and finished eighth in the SWAC.

== Schedule ==
Date	Opponent	Site	Result	Attendance	Source
September 5	at Texas Southern	Rice Stadium; Houston, TX (Labor Day Classic)	L 0–35		
September 12	Angelo State*	Edward L. Blackshear Field; Prairie View, TX	L 3–33		
September 19	Langston*	Edward L. Blackshear Field; Prairie View, TX	L 0–33		
October 3	vs. Grambling State	Cotton Bowl; Dallas, TX (rivalry)	L 3–63	54,307	
October 10	at West Texas State*	Kimbrough Memorial Stadium; Canyon, TX	L 15–21		
October 17	Alcorn State	Edward L. Blackshear Field; Prairie View, TX	L 0–63		
October 24	at Alabama State	Cramton Bowl; Montgomery, AL	L 6–44	6,782	
October 31	at Mississippi Valley State	Magnolia Stadium; Itta Bena, MS	L 14–35		
November 7	Southwest Texas State*	Edward L. Blackshear Field; Prairie View, TX	L 7–56		
November 14	at Jackson State	Mississippi Veterans Memorial Stadium; Jackson, MS	L 0–46	3,000	
November 21	Southern	Edward L. Blackshear Field; Prairie View, TX	L 7–12		
*Non-conference game
