= Barry Gallup =

American football player and coach (born 1946)

Barry Gallup Sr.
Biographical details
- Born: August 15, 1946 (age 80); Lynn, Massachusetts, U.S.

Playing career
- 1965–1968: Boston College
- Position: Wide receiver

Coaching career (HC unless noted)
- 1969: Boston College (asst. freshmen)
- 1973–1980: Boston College (DL)
- 1981–1990: Boston College (WR/RC)
- 1991–1999: Northeastern

Administrative career (AD unless noted)
- 1993–1997: Northeastern
- 2000–2012: Boston College (assistant AD)

Head coaching record
- Overall: 38–60–1

Barry Gallup Sr. (born August 15, 1946) is an American former college football coach and college athletics administrator. He spent 46 years as a player, coach, or administrator for the Boston College Eagles football team and was the head football coach at Northeastern University from 1991 to 1999, compiling a record of 38–60–1.

== Athletic career ==
During his prep years, Gallup played at Swampscott High School and Deerfield Academy. At Boston College, he set school records for receptions (87) and receiving yards (1,325). He also played two seasons of college basketball under Bob Cousy and was a member of the BC team that made the Elite Eight in 1967.

== Coaching ==
After graduating, Gallup accepting a teaching position in Swampscott, Massachusetts and worked as BC's assistant freshman football coach after school hours. In 1973, he succeeded John Petercuskie as the Eagles' defensive line coach. In 1981, he was a frontrunner from the head coaching job, but the school chose to hire Maine head coach and former BC assistant Jack Bicknell instead. Bicknell retained Gallup on his coaching staff, moving him to receivers coach and recruiting coordinator.

As BC's primary recruiter, Gallup helped bring Doug Flutie, Joe Nash, Fred Smerlas and Peter Cronan to the school and was a key builder of the BC teams that played in the 1982 Tangerine Bowl, 1983 Liberty Bowl, 1985 Cotton Bowl, and 1986 Hall of Fame Bowl. As receivers coach, he coached several future professional players, including Brian Brennan, Mark Chmura, Kelvin Martin, Pete Mitchell, Tom Waddle, and Darren Flutie.

After being passed over for the head coaching job again after Bicknell's firing, Gallup left BC to become the head football coach at Northeastern. He inherited a team that went 1-10 and led them to a 4-7 record in his first year. The team improved to 5-5-1 in 1992. He had his first winning season (6-5) in 1996 and followed it up with an 8-3 record the following year. He retired from coaching in 2000 to accept an administrative role at Boston College.

== Administration ==
Gallup was considered for the head coaching position at Harvard after Joe Restic announced his retirement prior to the 1993 season, but he instead chose to become Northeastern's athletic director while remaining football coach. During his tenure as AD, Northeastern earned NCAA certification and hired men's hockey coach Bruce Crowder and men's basketball coach Dave Leitao. He resigned in December 1996 to focus on coaching.

In 2000, Gallup returned to Boston College as assistant athletic director for football operations. In 2013, he became the senior associate athletic director for football and alumni relations. In 2021, Boston College named its new football medical center the Barry Gallup '69 Sports Medicine Center. He retired in 2022 after 46 years with the football program.

== Personal ==
Gallup resides in Wellesley with wife, Victoria. Their oldest son, Darren Douglas Gallup, was going to play football at Harvard in 2003, but was killed in a motor vehicle accident his senior year at Belmont Hill School. Their youngest son, Barry Jr., played football at Notre Dame. Daughter Lisa Ann Gallup died at the age of 26 from cancer.

== Head coaching record ==
Year	Team	Overall	Conference	Standing	Bowl/playoffs
Northeastern Huskies (NCAA Division I-AA independent) (1991–1992)
1991	Northeastern	4–7			
1992	Northeastern	5–5–1			
Northeastern Huskies (Yankee Conference) (1993–1996)
1993	Northeastern	2–9	2–6	5th (New England)	
1994	Northeastern	2–9	2–6	T–4th (New England)	
1995	Northeastern	4–7	2–6	T–5th (New England)	
1996	Northeastern	6–5	3–5	5th (New England)	
Northeastern Huskies (Atlantic 10 Conference) (1997–1998)
1997	Northeastern	8–3	5–3	3rd (New England)	
1998	Northeastern	5–6	3–5	5th (New England)	
1999	Northeastern	2–9	1–7	T–10th (New England)	
Northeastern:		38–60–1	18–38		
Total:		38–60–1			
