= 1992 Howard Bison football team =

American college football season

1992 Howard Bison football
- Conference: Mid-Eastern Athletic Conference
- Record: 7–4 (3–3 MEAC)
- Head coach: Steve Wilson (4th season)
- Home stadium: William H. Greene Stadium; Robert F. Kennedy Memorial Stadium

1992 Mid-Eastern Athletic Conference football standings
	Conf.					Overall
Team	W		L		T	W		L		T
No. 17 North Carolina A&T $^	5	–	1	–	0	9	–	3	–	0
No. 15 Florida A&M	4	–	2	–	0	7	–	4	–	0
South Carolina State	4	–	2	–	0	7	–	4	–	0
Howard	3	–	3	–	0	7	–	4	–	0
Delaware State	3	–	3	–	0	6	–	5	–	0
Bethune–Cookman	2	–	4	–	0	4	–	7	–	0
Morgan State	0	–	6	–	0	2	–	9	–	0
$ – Conference champion; ^ – NCAA Division I-AA playoff participant; Rankings from NCAA Division I-AA Football Committee poll

The 1992 Howard Bison football team represented Howard University as a member of the Mid-Eastern Athletic Conference (MEAC) during the 1992 NCAA Division I-AA football season. Led by fourth-year head coach Steve Wilson, the Bison compiled an overall record of 7–4, with a conference record of 3–3, and finished tied for fourth in the MEAC.

== Schedule ==
Date	Opponent	Site	Result	Attendance	Source
September 5	at Morehouse*	B. T. Harvey Stadium; Atlanta, GA	L 0–7	10,339	
September 12	at Alabama A&M*	Milton Frank Stadium; Huntsville, AL	W 28–7		
September 19	Cheyney*	William H. Greene Stadium; Washington, DC	W 75–6		
September 26	Alcorn State*	William H. Greene Stadium; Washington, DC	W 48–42		
October 3	at No. 11 Florida A&M	Bragg Memorial Stadium; Tallahassee, FL	L 3–10		
October 10	Bethune–Cookman	William H. Greene Stadium; Washington, DC	W 26–7		
October 24	No. 18 North Carolina A&T	William H. Greene Stadium; Washington, DC	L 14–16		
October 31	Bowie State*^{†}	Robert F. Kennedy Memorial Stadium; Washington, DC	W 55–6	11,553	
November 7	at South Carolina State	Oliver C. Dawson Stadium; Orangeburg, SC	L 18–28		
November 14	Morgan State	William H. Greene Stadium; Washington, DC (rivalry)	W 68–21	3,139	
November 21	Delaware State	William H. Greene Stadium; Washington, DC	W 31–28		
*Non-conference game; ^{†}Homecoming; Rankings from NCAA Division I-AA Football Committee Poll released prior to the game
