= 1992 Towson State Tigers football team =

American college football season

1992 Towson State Tigers football
- Conference: Independent
- Record: 5–5
- Head coach: Gordy Combs (1st season)
- Home stadium: Minnegan Stadium

1992 NCAA Division I-AA independents football standings
	Conf.			Overall
Team	W	L	T	W		L		T
No. 13 William & Mary		–		9	–	2	–	0
No. 7 Youngstown State ^		–		9	–	2	–	1
No. 9 Samford ^		–		9	–	3	–	0
Georgia Southern		–		7	–	4	–	0
No. 19 Liberty		–		7	–	4	–	0
UCF		–		6	–	4	–	0
Northeastern		–		5	–	5	–	1
Towson State		–		5	–	5	–	0
Western Kentucky		–		4	–	6	–	0
James Madison		–		4	–	7	–	0
^ – NCAA Division I-AA playoff participant; Rankings from NCAA Division I-AA Football Committee poll

The 1992 Towson State Tigers football team was an American football team that represented Towson State University (now known as Towson University) as an independent during the 1992 NCAA Division I-AA football season. Led by first-year head coach Gordy Combs, the team compiled a 5–5 record.

== Schedule ==
Date	Opponent	Site	Result	Attendance	Source
September 12	at Rhode Island	Meade Stadium; Kingston, RI	L 19–36	5,852	
September 19	Bucknell	Minnegan Stadium; Towson, MD	W 24–21	2,125	
September 26	Hofstra	Minnegan Stadium; Towson, MD	W 37–18	1,911	
October 3	Liberty	Minnegan Stadium; Towson, MD	L 14–16	2,091	
October 10	at Delaware State	Alumni Stadium; Dover, DE	L 13–27		
October 17	at No. 10 William & Mary	Zable Stadium; Williamsburg, VA	L 15–43	15,122	
October 24	James Madison	Minnegan Stadium; Towson, MD	W 28–21	4,069	
October 31	at No. 2 (D-II) IUP	Miller Stadium; Indiana, PA	W 35–33		
November 14	Northeastern	Minnegan Stadium; Towson, MD	W 33–32	1,687	
November 21	at No. 10 Delaware	Delaware Stadium; Newark, DE	L 27–55	15,262	
Rankings from NCAA Division I-AA Football Committee Poll released prior to the game
