= 1992 Morgan State Bears football team =

American college football season

1992 Morgan State Bears football
- Conference: Mid-Eastern Athletic Conference
- Record: 2–9 (0–6 MEAC)
- Head coach: Ricky Diggs (2nd season)
- Home stadium: Hughes Stadium

1992 Mid-Eastern Athletic Conference football standings
	Conf.					Overall
Team	W		L		T	W		L		T
No. 17 North Carolina A&T $^	5	–	1	–	0	9	–	3	–	0
No. 15 Florida A&M	4	–	2	–	0	7	–	4	–	0
South Carolina State	4	–	2	–	0	7	–	4	–	0
Howard	3	–	3	–	0	7	–	4	–	0
Delaware State	3	–	3	–	0	6	–	5	–	0
Bethune–Cookman	2	–	4	–	0	4	–	7	–	0
Morgan State	0	–	6	–	0	2	–	9	–	0
$ – Conference champion; ^ – NCAA Division I-AA playoff participant; Rankings from NCAA Division I-AA Football Committee poll

The 1992 Morgan State Bears football team represented Morgan State University as a member of the Mid-Eastern Athletic Conference (MEAC) during the 1992 NCAA Division I-AA football season. Led by second-year head coach Ricky Diggs, the Bears compiled an overall record of 2–9, with a mark of 0–6 in conference play, and finished seventh in the MEAC.

== Schedule ==
Date	Opponent	Site	Result	Attendance	Source
September 12	at Liberty*	Liberty University Stadium; Lynchburg, VA	L 27–55	5,008	
September 19	at North Carolina A&T	Aggie Stadium; Greensboro, NC	L 23–52	7,880	
September 26	Johnson C. Smith*	Hughes Stadium; Baltimore, MD	W 25–21	5,428	
October 3	at Buffalo*	Rotary Field; Buffalo, NY	W 45–27	3,104	
October 10	at South Carolina State	Oliver C. Dawson Stadium; Orangeburg, SC	L 14–31		
October 17	Central State (OH)*	Hughes Stadium; Baltimore, MD	L 29–51	8,023	
October 24	Delaware State	Hughes Stadium; Baltimore, MD	L 16–34	13,048	
October 31	at No. 12 Florida A&M	Bragg Memorial Stadium; Tallahassee, FL	L 32–42	28,547	
November 7	at Western Illinois*	Hanson Field; Macomb, IL	L 13–63	3,127	
November 14	at Howard	William H. Greene Stadium; Washington, DC (rivalry)	L 21–68	3,139	
November 21	Bethune–Cookman	Hughes Stadium; Baltimore, MD	L 0–1 (forfeit)		
*Non-conference game; Rankings from NCAA Division I-AA Football Committee Poll released prior to the game
