= 1992 Texas Southern Tigers football team =

American college football season

1992 Texas Southern Tigers football
- Conference: Southwestern Athletic Conference
- Record: 5–6 (3–4 SWAC)
- Head coach: Wally Highsmith (4th season)
- Home stadium: Robertson Stadium; Rice Stadium

1992 Southwestern Athletic Conference football standings
	Conf.					Overall
Team	W		L		T	W		L		T
No. 18 Alcorn State $^	7	–	0	–	0	7	–	4	–	0
Grambling State	6	–	1	–	0	10	–	2	–	0
Jackson State	4	–	3	–	0	7	–	4	–	0
Alabama State	3	–	4	–	0	5	–	6	–	0
Southern	3	–	4	–	0	5	–	6	–	0
Texas Southern	3	–	4	–	0	5	–	6	–	0
Mississippi Valley State	2	–	5	–	0	4	–	5	–	0
Prairie View A&M	0	–	7	–	0	0	–	11	–	0
$ – Conference champion; ^ – NCAA Division I-AA playoff participant; Rankings from NCAA Division I-AA Football Committee poll

The 1992 Texas Southern Tigers football team represented Texas Southern University as a member of the Southwestern Athletic Conference (SWAC) during the 1992 NCAA Division I-AA football season. Led by fourth-year head coach Wally Highsmith, the Tigers compiled an overall record of 5–6, with a mark of 3–4 in conference play, and finished tied for fourth in the SWAC.

== Schedule ==
Date	Opponent	Site	Result	Attendance	Source
September 5	Prairie View A&M	Rice Stadium; Houston, TX (Labor Day Classic)	W 35–0		
September 12	vs. Southwest Texas State*	Alamo Stadium; San Antonio, TX	L 34–39		
September 26	vs. Central State (OH)*	Cooper Stadium; Columbus, OH (Capital City Classic)	W 30–17		
October 3	Knoxville*	Robertson Stadium; Houston, TX	W 39–22		
October 10	at Alcorn State	Jack Spinks Stadium; Lorman, MS	L 36–46		
October 17	vs. Alabama State	Ladd Stadium; Mobile, AL (Gulf Coast Classic)	W 30–28		
October 24	Mississippi Valley State	Robertson Stadium; Houston, TX	L 13–25		
October 31	Grambling State	Rice Stadium; Houston, TX	L 17–24		
November 7	at Jackson State	Mississippi Veterans Memorial Stadium; Jackson, MS	W 27–26		
November 14	at Southern	A. W. Mumford Stadium; Baton Rouge, LA	L 6–34		
November 21	at Nevada*	Mackay Stadium; Reno, NV	L 14–38	18,946	
*Non-conference game
