= 1992 Alcorn State Braves football team =

American college football season

1992 Alcorn State Braves football

SWAC champion

NCAA Division I-AA First Round, L 27–78 vs. Northeast Louisiana
- Conference: Southwestern Athletic Conference
- Record: 7–4 (7–0 SWAC)
- Head coach: Cardell Jones (2nd season)
- Home stadium: Jack Spinks Stadium

1992 Southwestern Athletic Conference football standings
	Conf.					Overall
Team	W		L		T	W		L		T
No. 18 Alcorn State $^	7	–	0	–	0	7	–	4	–	0
Grambling State	6	–	1	–	0	10	–	2	–	0
Jackson State	4	–	3	–	0	7	–	4	–	0
Alabama State	3	–	4	–	0	5	–	6	–	0
Southern	3	–	4	–	0	5	–	6	–	0
Texas Southern	3	–	4	–	0	5	–	6	–	0
Mississippi Valley State	2	–	5	–	0	4	–	5	–	0
Prairie View A&M	0	–	7	–	0	0	–	11	–	0
$ – Conference champion; ^ – NCAA Division I-AA playoff participant; Rankings from NCAA Division I-AA Football Committee poll

The 1992 Alcorn State Braves football team represented Alcorn State University as a member of the Southwestern Athletic Conference (SWAC) during the 1992 NCAA Division I-AA football season. Led by second-year head coach Cardell Jones, the Braves compiled an overall record of 7–4, with a conference record of 7–0, and finished as SWAC champion.

== Schedule ==
Date	Opponent	Rank	Site	Result	Attendance	Source
September 5	at Grambling State		Eddie G. Robinson Memorial Stadium; Grambling, LA	W 33–35	14,455	
September 19	No. 7 Alabama State		Jack Spinks Stadium; Lorman, MS	W 32–7	17,560	
September 26	at Howard*		William H. Greene Stadium; Washington, DC	L 42–48		
October 3	at Sam Houston State*		Bowers Stadium; Huntsville, TX	L 27–28		
October 10	Texas Southern		Jack Spinks Stadium; Lorman, MS	W 46–36		
October 17	at Prairie View A&M		Edward L. Blackshear Field; Prairie View, TX	W 63–0		
October 24	Southern		Jack Spinks Stadium; Lorman, MS	W 35–13		
October 31	at Jacksonville State*		Paul Snow Stadium; Jacksonville, AL	L 45–59	12,100	
November 7	at Mississippi Valley State		Magnolia Stadium; Itta Bena, MS	W 31–0		
November 21	at Jackson State		Mississippi Veterans Memorial Stadium; Jackson, MS (Soul Bowl)	W 42–35		
November 28	at No. 2 Northeast Louisiana*	No. 18	Malone Stadium; Monroe, LA (NCAA Division I-AA First Round)	L 27–78		
*Non-conference game; Rankings from NCAA Division I-AA Football Committee Poll released prior to the game
