= Jeff Heacock =

American football coach

Biographical details
- Born: Alliance, Ohio, U.S.
- Education: Muskingum University (1976)

Playing career

Football
- 1972–1975: Muskingum
- Position: Defensive back

Coaching career (HC unless noted)

Football
- 1976–1977: West Branch HS (OH) (DC)
- 1978–1979: Muskingum (assistant)
- 1980: Muskingum (DC)
- 1981–2006: Muskingum

Track and field
- 1980–1981: Muskingum

Head coaching record
- Overall: 109–144–4 (football); 7–3 (track and field)

Jeffrey W. Heacock is an American former football and track and field coach. He was the head football coach for Muskingum University from 1981 to 2006.

== Career ==
Heacock was raised in Alliance, Ohio, and attended West Branch High School. He was an All-Ohio Athletic Conference (OAC) and Little All-American football player at Muskingum. During his senior year, he led the team to an OAC championship and was a co-captain.

Heacock began his coaching career as the defensive coordinator for his alma mater, West Branch. After two years, he returned to his college alma mater, Muskingum, as an assistant football coach. In 1980, he was promoted to defensive coordinator and the head track and field coach. In two seasons as track coach, he coached the team to a 7–3 dual meet record.

In 1981, Heacock was promoted to head football coach at 27 years old. He took over for 11-year head coach Al Christopher. Heacock coached the team until his resignation in 2006. At the time of his resignation, he was top-30 all-time in NCAA Division III wins with 109 and 11th in the OAC.

After Heacock resigned, he was promoted to the university's assistant vice president of student affairs for external relations.

== Personal life ==
Heacock's father, Clint, was an alumnus of Muskingum and was an All-OAC player in the 1930s. Heacock's brother, Jim, was drafted by the Green Bay Packers of the National Football League (NFL) and was the head football coach for Illinois State University.

== Head coaching record ==
=== Football ===
Year	Team	Overall	Conference	Standing	Bowl/playoffs
Muskingum Fighting Muskies (Ohio Athletic Conference) (1981–2006)
1981	Muskingum	3–6	1–5	T–6th (Blue)	
1982	Muskingum	2–7	0–5	6th (Red)	
1983	Muskingum	6–3	4–1	2nd (Blue)	
1984	Muskingum	9–1	7–1	2nd	
1985	Muskingum	7–3	5–3	T–3rd	
1986	Muskingum	7–3	6–2	T–2nd	
1987	Muskingum	5–4–1	5–2–1	4th	
1988	Muskingum	4–5–1	2–5–1	6th	
1989	Muskingum	7–3	6–2	3rd	
1990	Muskingum	3–7	2–7	T–8th	
1991	Muskingum	7–3	6–3	3rd	
1992	Muskingum	4–6	3–6	T–7th	
1993	Muskingum	2–7–1	2–6–1	8th	
1994	Muskingum	2–8	2–7	T–8th	
1995	Muskingum	6–3–1	5–3–1	5th	
1996	Muskingum	5–5	4–5	6th	
1997	Muskingum	2–8	2–7	T–7th	
1998	Muskingum	5–5	4–5	6th	
1999	Muskingum	3–7	2–7	T–7th	
2000	Muskingum	4–6	3–6	T–6th	
2001	Muskingum	3–7	2–7	8th	
2002	Muskingum	3–7	3–6	6th	
2003	Muskingum	5–5	4–5	T–5th	
2004	Muskingum	1–9	1–8	9th	
2005	Muskingum	2–8	2–7	T–8th	
2006	Muskingum	2–8	1–8	9th	
Muskingum:		109–144–4	84–119–4		
Total:		109–144–4			
