= 1992 Southwest Missouri State Bears football team =

American college football season

1992 Southwest Missouri State Bears football
- Conference: Gateway Football Conference
- Record: 6–5 (4–2 GFC)
- Head coach: Jesse Branch (7th season)
- Captains: Derek Cooper; Damon Frost; Matt Irvin; Rick Perry
- Home stadium: Plaster Sports Complex

1992 Gateway Football Conference standings
	Conf.					Overall
Team	W		L		T	W		L		T
No. 3 Northern Iowa $^	5	–	1	–	0	12	–	2	–	0
No. 20 Western Illinois	4	–	2	–	0	7	–	4	–	0
Southwest Missouri State	4	–	2	–	0	6	–	5	–	0
Eastern Illinois	2	–	4	–	0	5	–	6	–	0
Illinois State	2	–	4	–	0	5	–	6	–	0
Indiana State	2	–	4	–	0	4	–	7	–	0
Southern Illinois	2	–	4	–	0	4	–	7	–	0
$ – Conference champion; ^ – NCAA Division I-AA playoff participant; Rankings from NCAA Division I-AA Football Committee poll

The 1992 Southwest Missouri State Bears football team represented Southwest Missouri State University (now known as Missouri State University) as a member of the Gateway Football Conference (GFC) during the 1992 NCAA Division I-AA football season. Led by seventh-year head coach Del Miller, the Bears compiled an overall record of 6–5, with a mark of 4–2 in conference play, and finished tied for second in the GFC.

== Schedule ==
Date	Time	Opponent	Rank	Site	Result	Attendance	Source
September 5		at No. 19 McNeese State*		Cowboy Stadium; Lake Charles, LA	L 13–16	15,702	
September 12		Washburn*		Plaster Sports Complex; Springfield, MO	W 66–15	12,904	
September 19		North Texas*	No. 17	Plaster Sports Complex; Springfield, MO	W 35–10	12,475	
September 26		at Pacific (CA)*	No. 11	Stagg Memorial Stadium; Stockton, CA	L 14–48		
October 3		Western Illinois	No. 17	Plaster Sports Complex; Springfield, MO	W 16–13		
October 10		at Tulsa*	No. 16	Skelly Stadium; Tulsa, OK	L 14–17	21,856	
October 17		at Illinois State	No. 18	Hancock Stadium; Normal, IL	W 24–21	11,288	
October 24		Eastern Illinois	No. 14	Plaster Sports Complex; Springfield, MO	W 13–10		
November 7		Southern Illinois	No. 12	Plaster Sports Complex; Springfield, MO	W 51–12	10,782	
November 14		at Indiana State	No. 11	Memorial Stadium; Terre Haute, IN	L 28–31	981	
November 21	6:30 p.m.	at No. 3 Northern Iowa		UNI-Dome; Cedar Falls, IA	L 12–37	16,324	
*Non-conference game; Rankings from NCAA Division I-AA Football Committee Poll released prior to the game; All times are in Central time
