= 1992 Jackson State Tigers football team =

American college football season

1992 Jackson State Tigers football
- Conference: Southwestern Athletic Conference
- Record: 7–4 (4–3 SWAC)
- Head coach: James Carson (1st season)
- Offensive coordinator: John McKenzie (1st season)
- Home stadium: Mississippi Veterans Memorial Stadium

1992 Southwestern Athletic Conference football standings
	Conf.					Overall
Team	W		L		T	W		L		T
No. 18 Alcorn State $^	7	–	0	–	0	7	–	4	–	0
Grambling State	6	–	1	–	0	10	–	2	–	0
Jackson State	4	–	3	–	0	7	–	4	–	0
Alabama State	3	–	4	–	0	5	–	6	–	0
Southern	3	–	4	–	0	5	–	6	–	0
Texas Southern	3	–	4	–	0	5	–	6	–	0
Mississippi Valley State	2	–	5	–	0	4	–	5	–	0
Prairie View A&M	0	–	7	–	0	0	–	11	–	0
$ – Conference champion; ^ – NCAA Division I-AA playoff participant; Rankings from NCAA Division I-AA Football Committee poll

The 1992 Jackson State Tigers football team represented Jackson State University as a member of the Southwestern Athletic Conference (SWAC) during the 1992 NCAA Division I-AA football season. Led by first-year head coach James Carson, the Tigers compiled an overall record of 7–4 and a mark of 4–3 in conference play, and finished third in the SWAC.

== Schedule ==
Date	Opponent	Rank	Site	Result	Attendance	Source
September 5	Tuskegee*		Mississippi Veterans Memorial Stadium; Jackson, MS	W 30–0	17,500	
September 12	vs. Tennessee State*		Liberty Bowl Memorial Stadium; Memphis, TN (Southern Heritage Classic)	W 38–18	37,437	
September 19	at Stephen F. Austin*		Homer Bryce Stadium; Nacogdoches, TX	L 26–41	8,645	
September 26	Mississippi Valley State		Mississippi Veterans Memorial Stadium; Jackson, MS	W 42–14	40,000	
October 3	vs. South Carolina State*		Williams–Brice Stadium; Columbia, SC (Palmetto Classic)	W 41–3	25,200	
October 10	at Alabama State		Cramton Bowl; Montgomery, AL	W 21–7		
October 17	at Southern	No. 20	A. W. Mumford Stadium; Baton Rouge, LA (rivalry)	W 25–24	27,237	
October 24	at Grambling State	No. T–20	Eddie G. Robinson Memorial Stadium; Grambling, LA	L 31–34		
November 7	Texas Southern		Mississippi Veterans Memorial Stadium; Jackson, MS	L 26–27		
November 14	Prairie View A&M		Mississippi Veterans Memorial Stadium; Jackson, MS	W 46–0	3,000	
November 21	Alcorn State		Mississippi Veterans Memorial Stadium; Jackson, MS (Soul Bowl)	L 35–42		
*Non-conference game; Rankings from NCAA Division I-AA Football Committee Poll released prior to the game
