= 1992 James Madison Dukes football team =

American college football season

1992 James Madison Dukes football
- Conference: Independent
- Record: 4–7
- Head coach: Rip Scherer (2nd season)
- Home stadium: Bridgeforth Stadium

1992 NCAA Division I-AA independents football standings
	Conf.			Overall
Team	W	L	T	W		L		T
No. 13 William & Mary		–		9	–	2	–	0
No. 7 Youngstown State ^		–		9	–	2	–	1
No. 9 Samford ^		–		9	–	3	–	0
Georgia Southern		–		7	–	4	–	0
No. 19 Liberty		–		7	–	4	–	0
UCF		–		6	–	4	–	0
Northeastern		–		5	–	5	–	1
Towson State		–		5	–	5	–	0
Western Kentucky		–		4	–	6	–	0
James Madison		–		4	–	7	–	0
^ – NCAA Division I-AA playoff participant; Rankings from NCAA Division I-AA Football Committee poll

The 1992 James Madison Dukes football team was an American football team that represented James Madison University during the 1992 NCAA Division I-AA football season as an independent. In their second year under head coach Rip Scherer, the team compiled a 4–7 record.

== Schedule ==
Date	Opponent	Site	Result	Attendance	Source
September 5	at Virginia Tech	Lane Stadium; Blacksburg, VA	L 20–49	43,684	
September 12	at Richmond	City Stadium; Richmond, VA (rivalry)	L 40–49	14,666	
September 19	Hofstra	Bridgeforth Stadium; Harrisonburg, VA	W 38–6	10,200	
September 26	at No. 1 Youngstown State	Stambaugh Stadium; Youngstown, OH	W 52–49	16,826	
October 3	Northeastern	Bridgeforth Stadium; Harrisonburg, VA	W 35–34	11,200	
October 10	Appalachian State	Bridgeforth Stadium; Harrisonburg, VA	L 21–27	14,000	
October 17	at Georgia Southern	Paulson Stadium; Statesboro, GA	L 17–24	13,714	
October 24	at Towson State	Minnegan Stadium; Towson, MD	L 21–28	4,069	
October 31	No. 10 William & Mary	Bridgeforth Stadium; Harrisonburg, VA (rivalry)	W 21–14	7,400	
November 7	Liberty	Bridgeforth Stadium; Harrisonburg, VA	L 31–34	6,250	
November 14	at UCF	Florida Citrus Bowl; Orlando, FL	L 37–41	6,681	
Rankings from NCAA Division I-AA Football Committee Poll released prior to the game
