= 1992 William & Mary Tribe football team =

American college football season

1992 William & Mary Tribe football

Ivy Bowl, W 35–19 at Nihon University
- Conference: Independent
- Record: 9–2
- Head coach: Jimmye Laycock (13th season)
- Defensive coordinator: Joe Bottiglieri (2nd season)
- Captains: Joe Person; Palmer Scarritt; Alex Utecht
- Home stadium: Zable Stadium

1992 NCAA Division I-AA independents football standings
	Conf.			Overall
Team	W	L	T	W		L		T
No. 13 William & Mary		–		9	–	2	–	0
No. 7 Youngstown State ^		–		9	–	2	–	1
No. 9 Samford ^		–		9	–	3	–	0
Georgia Southern		–		7	–	4	–	0
No. 19 Liberty		–		7	–	4	–	0
UCF		–		6	–	4	–	0
Northeastern		–		5	–	5	–	1
Towson State		–		5	–	5	–	0
Western Kentucky		–		4	–	6	–	0
James Madison		–		4	–	7	–	0
^ – NCAA Division I-AA playoff participant; Rankings from NCAA Division I-AA Football Committee poll

The 1992 William & Mary Tribe football team represented the College of William & Mary as an independent during the 1992 NCAA Division I-AA football season. Led by Jimmye Laycock in his 13th year as head coach, William & Mary finished the season with a record of 9–2 and ranked No. 13 in the final NCAA Division I-AA Football Committee poll.

== Schedule ==
Date	Opponent	Rank	Site	Result	Attendance	Source
September 12	VMI		Zable Stadium; Williamsburg, VA (rivalry)	W 21–16	12,316	
September 19	Boston University	No. 18	Zable Stadium; Williamsburg, VA	W 31–21	9,205	
September 26	at Harvard	No. 14	Harvard Stadium; Boston, MA	W 36–16	5,794	
October 3	Brown	No. 10	Zable Stadium; Williamsburg, VA	W 51–6	13,012	
October 10	at Penn	No. 10	Franklin Field; Philadelphia, PA	W 21–19	9,685	
October 17	Towson State^{†}	No. 10	Zable Stadium; Williamsburg, VA	W 43–15	15,122	
October 24	at No. 24 (I-A) Virginia	No. 10	Scott Stadium; Charlottesville, VA	L 7–33	40,100	
October 31	at James Madison	No. 10	Bridgeforth Stadium; Harrisonburg, VA (rivalry)	L 14–21	7,400	
November 7	at Colgate	No. 17	Andy Kerr Stadium; Hamilton, NY	W 44–26	850	
November 14	Lehigh	No. 18	Zable Stadium; Williamsburg, VA	W 26–13	10,329	
November 21	at No. 19 Richmond	No. 13	University of Richmond Stadium; Richmond, VA (I-64 Bowl)	W 34–19	19,377	
January 9, 1993	at Nihon University		Tokyo Dome; Tokyo, Japan (Ivy Bowl)	W 35–19	40,000	
^{†}Homecoming; Rankings from NCAA Division I-AA Football Committee Poll released prior to the game
