= 1992 Liberty Flames football team =

American college football season

1992 Liberty Flames football
- Conference: Independent
- Record: 7–4
- Head coach: Sam Rutigliano (4th season)
- Home stadium: Liberty University Stadium

1992 NCAA Division I-AA independents football standings
	Conf.			Overall
Team	W	L	T	W		L		T
No. 13 William & Mary		–		9	–	2	–	0
No. 7 Youngstown State ^		–		9	–	2	–	1
No. 9 Samford ^		–		9	–	3	–	0
Georgia Southern		–		7	–	4	–	0
No. 19 Liberty		–		7	–	4	–	0
UCF		–		6	–	4	–	0
Northeastern		–		5	–	5	–	1
Towson State		–		5	–	5	–	0
Western Kentucky		–		4	–	6	–	0
James Madison		–		4	–	7	–	0
^ – NCAA Division I-AA playoff participant; Rankings from NCAA Division I-AA Football Committee poll

The 1992 Liberty Flames football team represented Liberty University as an independent during the 1992 NCAA Division I-AA football season. Led by fourth-year head coach Sam Rutigliano, the Flames compiled an overall record of 7–4.

== Schedule ==
Date	Opponent	Site	Result	Attendance	Source
September 5	at Furman	Paladin Stadium; Greenville, SC	L 13–31	9,035	
September 12	Morgan State	Liberty University Stadium; Lynchburg, VA	W 55–27	5,008	
September 19	Concord	Liberty University Stadium; Lynchburg, VA	W 26–8		
September 26	at North Carolina A&T	Aggie Stadium; Greensboro, NC	L 32–35		
October 3	at Towson State	Minnegan Stadium; Towson, MD	W 16–14	2,091	
October 10	at Maine	Alumni Field; Orono, ME	L 20–42		
October 17	Troy State	Liberty University Stadium; Lynchburg, VA	W 9–7	3,000	
October 24	at Northern Illinois	Huskie Stadium; DeKalb, IL	L 21–27	12,105	
October 31	UCF	Liberty University Stadium; Lynchburg, VA	W 31–28	8,100	
November 7	at James Madison	Bridgeforth Stadium; Harrisonburg, VA	W 34–31	6,250	
November 14	Delaware State	Liberty University Stadium; Lynchburg, VA	W 49–27		
