= 1992 Alabama State Hornets football team =

American college football season

1992 Alabama State Hornets football
- Conference: Southwestern Athletic Conference
- Record: 5–6 (3–4 SWAC)
- Head coach: Houston Markham (6th season)
- Home stadium: Cramton Bowl

1992 Southwestern Athletic Conference football standings
	Conf.					Overall
Team	W		L		T	W		L		T
No. 18 Alcorn State $^	7	–	0	–	0	7	–	4	–	0
Grambling State	6	–	1	–	0	10	–	2	–	0
Jackson State	4	–	3	–	0	7	–	4	–	0
Alabama State	3	–	4	–	0	5	–	6	–	0
Southern	3	–	4	–	0	5	–	6	–	0
Texas Southern	3	–	4	–	0	5	–	6	–	0
Mississippi Valley State	2	–	5	–	0	4	–	5	–	0
Prairie View A&M	0	–	7	–	0	0	–	11	–	0
$ – Conference champion; ^ – NCAA Division I-AA playoff participant; Rankings from NCAA Division I-AA Football Committee poll

The 1992 Alabama State Hornets football team represented Alabama State University as a member of the Southwestern Athletic Conference (SWAC) during the 1992 NCAA Division I-AA football season. Led by sixth-year head coach Houston Markham, the Hornets compiled an overall record of 5–6, with a mark of 3–4 in conference play, and finished tied for fourth in the SWAC.

== Schedule ==
Date	Opponent	Rank	Site	Result	Attendance	Source
September 12	at Southern		A. W. Mumford Stadium; Baton Rouge, LA	W 30–10		
September 19	at Alcorn State	No. 7	Jack Spinks Stadium; Lorman, MS	L 7–32	17,560	
September 26	at Troy State*	No. 18	Veterans Memorial Stadium; Troy, AL	L 14–31	15,000	
October 3	vs. Central State (OH)*		Hoosier Dome; Indianapolis, IN (Circle City Classic)	L 13–34	62,109	
October 10	Jackson State		Cramton Bowl; Montgomery, AL	L 7–21		
October 17	vs. Texas Southern		Ladd Stadium; Mobile, AL (Gulf Coast Classic)	L 28–30		
October 24	Prairie View A&M		Cramton Bowl; Montgomery, AL	W 44–6	6,782	
October 31	vs. Alabama A&M*		Legion Field; Birmingham, AL (Magic City Classic)	W 14–11	53,708	
November 7	at Grambling State		Eddie G. Robinson Memorial Stadium; Grambling, LA	L 19–44	21,000	
November 14	Mississippi Valley State		Cramton Bowl; Montgomery, AL	W 35–19		
November 26	Fayetteville State*		Cramton Bowl; Montgomery, AL (Turkey Day Classic)	W 17–14	14,360	
*Non-conference game; Rankings from NCAA Division I-AA Football Committee Poll released prior to the game
