= 1992 Florida A&M Rattlers football team =

American college football season

1992 Florida A&M Rattlers football

Heritage Bowl, L 15–45 vs. Grambling State
- Conference: Mid-Eastern Athletic Conference
- Record: 7–5 (4–2 MEAC)
- Head coach: Ken Riley (7th season)
- Offensive coordinator: Kent Schoolfield (4th season)
- Home stadium: Bragg Memorial Stadium

1992 Mid-Eastern Athletic Conference football standings
	Conf.					Overall
Team	W		L		T	W		L		T
No. 17 North Carolina A&T $^	5	–	1	–	0	9	–	3	–	0
No. 15 Florida A&M	4	–	2	–	0	7	–	4	–	0
South Carolina State	4	–	2	–	0	7	–	4	–	0
Howard	3	–	3	–	0	7	–	4	–	0
Delaware State	3	–	3	–	0	6	–	5	–	0
Bethune–Cookman	2	–	4	–	0	4	–	7	–	0
Morgan State	0	–	6	–	0	2	–	9	–	0
$ – Conference champion; ^ – NCAA Division I-AA playoff participant; Rankings from NCAA Division I-AA Football Committee poll

The 1992 Florida A&M Rattlers football team represented Florida A&M University as a member of the Mid-Eastern Athletic Conference (MEAC) during the 1992 NCAA Division I-AA football season. Led by seventh-year head coach Ken Riley, the Rattlers compiled an overall record of 7–5, with a mark of 4–2 in conference play, and finished tied for second in the MEAC.

== Schedule ==
Date	Opponent	Rank	Site	Result	Attendance	Source
September 5	at Georgia Southern*	No. 16	Paulson Stadium; Statesboro, GA	W 28–17	12,708	
September 12	South Carolina State	No. 16	Bragg Memorial Stadium; Tallahassee, FL	W 33–20		
September 19	at No. 1 (I-A) Miami (FL)*	No. 13	Miami Orange Bowl; Miami, FL	L 0–38	74,292	
September 26	vs. Tennessee State*	No. 20	Atlanta–Fulton County Stadium; Atlanta, GA (Atlanta Football Classic)	W 20–12	43,211	
October 3	Howard	No. 11	Bragg Memorial Stadium; Tallahassee, FL	W 10–3		
October 10	vs. No. 15 North Carolina A&T	No. 11	Florida Citrus Bowl; Orlando, FL	W 21–7	21,610	
October 17	at Delaware State	No. 9	Alumni Stadium; Dover, DE	L 20–22	4,783	
October 31	Morgan State	No. 12	Bragg Memorial Stadium; Tallahassee, FL	W 42–32	28,547	
November 7	at Southern*	No. 10	A. W. Mumford Stadium; Baton Rouge, LA	W 16–6	13,206	
November 14	Grambling State*	No. 8	Bragg Memorial Stadium; Tallahassee, FL	L 10–27	13,007	
November 28	vs. Bethune–Cookman	No. 15	Tampa Stadium; Tampa, FL (Florida Classic)	L 21–35	40,741	
January 2, 1993	Grambling State*	No. 15	Bragg Memorial Stadium; Tallahassee, FL (Heritage Bowl)	L 15–45	11,273	
*Non-conference game; Rankings from NCAA Division I-AA Football Committee Poll released prior to the game

== Roster ==
1992 Florida A&M Rattlers football team roster
Players
Coaches
Offense

Pos.	#	Name	Class
OT	73	Jamie Brown
TE	86	Chad Fann
WR	81	Terry Mickens

Defense

Pos.	#	Name	Class
DE	99	Ed Dunn
LB	45	Earl Holmes	Fr
CB	1	Ken Riley Jr.
LB	58	Samuel Stockton

Special teams

Pos.	#	Name	Class

Head coach

- Ken Riley

Coordinators/assistant coaches

Legend

- (C) Team captain
- (S) Suspended
- (I) Ineligible
- Injured
- Redshirt
