= 1992 Youngstown State Penguins football team =

American college football season

1992 Youngstown State Penguins football

NCAA Division I-AA runner up

NCAA Division I-AA Championship Game, L 28–31 vs. Marshall
- Conference: Independent
- Record: 11–3–1
- Head coach: Jim Tressel (7th season)
- Home stadium: Stambaugh Stadium

1992 NCAA Division I-AA independents football standings
	Conf.			Overall
Team	W	L	T	W		L		T
No. 13 William & Mary		–		9	–	2	–	0
No. 7 Youngstown State ^		–		9	–	2	–	1
No. 9 Samford ^		–		9	–	3	–	0
Georgia Southern		–		7	–	4	–	0
No. 19 Liberty		–		7	–	4	–	0
UCF		–		6	–	4	–	0
Northeastern		–		5	–	5	–	1
Towson State		–		5	–	5	–	0
Western Kentucky		–		4	–	6	–	0
James Madison		–		4	–	7	–	0
^ – NCAA Division I-AA playoff participant; Rankings from NCAA Division I-AA Football Committee poll

The 1992 Youngstown State Penguins football team was an American football team represented Youngstown State University as an independent during the 1992 NCAA Division I-AA football season. In their seventh season under head coach Jim Tressel, the team compiled an 11–3–1 record and lost to Marshall in the 1992 NCAA Division I-AA Football Championship Game. Youngstown appeared in the Division I-AA national championship game six times, and won the championship four times, during the 1990s.

Quarterback Nick Cochran received the team's most valuable player award. The team's statistical leaders included Cochran with 2,196 passing yards, Tamron Smith with 1,403 rushing yards and 126 points scored, and Leon Jones with 125 tackles (including 75 solo tackles).

== Schedule ==
Date	Opponent	Rank	Site	TV	Result	Attendance	Source
September 5	Clarion	No. 2	Stambaugh Stadium; Youngstown, OH		W 48–7		
September 12	Delaware State	No. 2	Stambaugh Stadium; Youngstown, OH		W 42–20	11,926	
September 19	at Southwest Texas State	No. 1	Bobcat Stadium; San Marcos, TX		W 23–20	11,217	
September 26	James Madison	No. 1	Stambaugh Stadium; Youngstown, OH		L 49–52	16,826	
October 3	at Indiana State	No. 7	Memorial Stadium; Terre Haute, IN		W 30–24	4,014	
October 10	Illinois State	No. 7	Stambaugh Stadium; Youngstown, OH		W 34–10	11,634	
October 17	at Northeastern	No. 6	Parsons Field; Brookline, MA		L 23–28	4,100	
October 31	Eastern Illinois	No. 11	Stambaugh Stadium; Youngstown, OH		W 28–19		
November 7	at Ohio	No. 9	Peden Stadium; Athens, OH		W 28–20	8,882	
November 14	at Akron	No. 7	Rubber Bowl; Akron, OH (Steel Tire)		T 10–10	6,912	
November 21	No. 20 Georgia Southern	No. 7	Stambaugh Stadium; Youngstown, OH		W 21–10	8,984	
November 28	No. 10 Villanova	No. 7	Stambaugh Stadium; Youngstown, OH (NCAA Division I-AA First Round)		W 23–20	9,465	
December 5	at No. 1 The Citadel	No. 7	Johnson Hagood Stadium; Charleston, SC (NCAA Division I-AA Quarterfinal)		W 42–17	13,021	
December 12	at No. 3 Northern Iowa	No. 7	UNI-Dome; Cedar Falls, IA (NCAA Division I-AA Semifinal)		W 19–7	14,682	
December 19	at No. 6 Marshall	No. 7	Marshall University Stadium; Huntington, WV (NCAA Division I-AA Football Championship Game)	CBS	L 28–31	31,304	
Rankings from NCAA Division I-AA Football Committee Poll released prior to the game
