= 1992 North Carolina A&T Aggies football team =

American college football season

1992 North Carolina A&T Aggies football

MEAC champion

NCAA Division I-AA First Round, L 0–44 at The Citadel
- Conference: Mid-Eastern Athletic Conference
- Record: 9–3 (5–1 MEAC)
- Head coach: Bill Hayes (5th season)
- Home stadium: Aggie Stadium

1992 Mid-Eastern Athletic Conference football standings
	Conf.					Overall
Team	W		L		T	W		L		T
No. 17 North Carolina A&T $^	5	–	1	–	0	9	–	3	–	0
No. 15 Florida A&M	4	–	2	–	0	7	–	4	–	0
South Carolina State	4	–	2	–	0	7	–	4	–	0
Howard	3	–	3	–	0	7	–	4	–	0
Delaware State	3	–	3	–	0	6	–	5	–	0
Bethune–Cookman	2	–	4	–	0	4	–	7	–	0
Morgan State	0	–	6	–	0	2	–	9	–	0
$ – Conference champion; ^ – NCAA Division I-AA playoff participant; Rankings from NCAA Division I-AA Football Committee poll

The 1992 North Carolina A&T Aggies football team represented North Carolina A&T State University as a member of the Mid-Eastern Athletic Conference (MEAC) during the 1992 NCAA Division I-AA football season. Led by fifth-year head coach Bill Hayes, the Aggies compiled an overall record of 9–3 with a mark of 5–1 in conference play, and were MEAC champion. North Carolina A&T advanced to the NCAA Division I-AA First Round and were defeated by The Citadel.

== Schedule ==
Date	Opponent	Rank	Site	Result	Attendance	Source
September 5	at North Carolina Central*		O'Kelly–Riddick Stadium; Durham, NC (rivalry)	W 49–7	10,853	
September 12	Winston–Salem State*		Aggie Stadium; Greensboro, NC (rivalry)	W 21–7		
September 19	Morgan State		Aggie Stadium; Greensboro, NC	W 52–23	7,880	
September 26	Liberty*		Aggie Stadium; Greensboro, NC	W 35–32		
October 3	at Norfolk State	No. 15	Foreman Field; Norfolk, VA	W 35–6	15,213	
October 10	vs. No. 11 Florida A&M	No. 15	Florida Citrus Bowl; Orlando, FL	L 7–21	21,610	
October 24	at Howard	No. 18	William H. Greene Stadium; Washington, D.C.	W 16–14		
October 31	Bethune–Cookman	No. 18	Aggie Stadium; Greensboro, NC	W 30–22	23,636	
November 7	at Delaware State	No. 19	Alumni Stadium; Dover, DE	W 24–10		
November 14	at Appalachian State*	No. 17	Kidd Brewer Stadium; Boone, NC	L 6–42	12,687	
November 21	South Carolina State		Aggie Stadium; Greensboro, NC (rivalry)	W 24–21		
November 28	at No. T–1 The Citadel*	No. 17	Johnson Hagood Stadium; Charleston, SC (NCAA Division I-AA First Round)	L 0–44	12,300	
*Non-conference game; Rankings from NCAA Division I-AA Football Committee Poll released prior to the game
