= 1992 Western Illinois Leathernecks football team =

American college football season

1992 Western Illinois Leathernecks football
- Conference: Gateway Football Conference
- Record: 7–4 (4–2 GFC)
- Head coach: Randy Ball (3rd season)
- Home stadium: Hanson Field

1992 Gateway Football Conference standings
	Conf.					Overall
Team	W		L		T	W		L		T
No. 3 Northern Iowa $^	5	–	1	–	0	12	–	2	–	0
No. 20 Western Illinois	4	–	2	–	0	7	–	4	–	0
Southwest Missouri State	4	–	2	–	0	6	–	5	–	0
Eastern Illinois	2	–	4	–	0	5	–	6	–	0
Illinois State	2	–	4	–	0	5	–	6	–	0
Indiana State	2	–	4	–	0	4	–	7	–	0
Southern Illinois	2	–	4	–	0	4	–	7	–	0
$ – Conference champion; ^ – NCAA Division I-AA playoff participant; Rankings from NCAA Division I-AA Football Committee poll

The 1992 Western Illinois Leathernecks football team represented Western Illinois University as a member of the Gateway Football Conference (GFC) during the 1992 NCAA Division I-AA football season. The team was led by third-year head coach Randy Ball and played their home games at Hanson Field in Macomb, Illinois. The Leathernecks finished the season with a 7–4 record overall and a 4–2 record in conference play.

== Schedule ==
Date	Opponent	Rank	Site	Result	Attendance	Source
September 5	Missouri Western State*		Hanson Field; Macomb, IL	W 42–7	8,307	
September 12	at Sam Houston State*		Bowers Stadium; Huntsville, TX	L 14–19		
September 19	Western Kentucky*		Hanson Field; Macomb, IL	W 31–30	6,230	
September 26	UCF*		Hanson Field; Macomb, IL	L 22–35	9,764	
October 3	at No. 17 Southwest Missouri State		Plaster Sports Complex; Springfield, MO	L 13–16		
October 10	at Southern Illinois		McAndrew Stadium; Carbondale, IL	W 50–42	13,000	
October 17	Eastern Illinois		Hanson Field; Macomb, IL	W 28–24		
October 24	Indiana State		Hanson Field; Macomb, IL	W 42–30		
October 31	Illinois State		Hanson Field; Macomb, IL	W 37–9	4,621	
November 7	Morgan State*		Hanson Field; Macomb, IL	W 63–13	3,127	
November 14	at No. 4 Northern Iowa	No. 19	UNI-Dome; Cedar Falls, IA	L 6–37	14,552	
*Non-conference game; Rankings from NCAA Division I-AA Football Committee Poll released prior to the game
