= 1992 Northern Iowa Panthers football team =

College football season

1992 Northern Iowa Panthers football

Gateway champion

NCAA Division I-AA Semifinal, L 7–19 vs. Youngstown State
- Conference: Gateway Football Conference
- Record: 12–2 (5–1 Gateway)
- Head coach: Terry Allen (4th season)
- Defensive coordinator: Ardell Wiegandt (4th season)
- Home stadium: UNI-Dome

1992 Gateway Football Conference standings
	Conf.					Overall
Team	W		L		T	W		L		T
No. 3 Northern Iowa $^	5	–	1	–	0	12	–	2	–	0
No. 20 Western Illinois	4	–	2	–	0	7	–	4	–	0
Southwest Missouri State	4	–	2	–	0	6	–	5	–	0
Eastern Illinois	2	–	4	–	0	5	–	6	–	0
Illinois State	2	–	4	–	0	5	–	6	–	0
Indiana State	2	–	4	–	0	4	–	7	–	0
Southern Illinois	2	–	4	–	0	4	–	7	–	0
$ – Conference champion; ^ – NCAA Division I-AA playoff participant; Rankings from NCAA Division I-AA Football Committee poll

The 1992 Northern Iowa Panthers football team was an American football team that represented the University of Northern Iowa as a member of the Gateway Football Conference (Gateway Conference) during the 1992 NCAA Division I-AA football season. In its fourth season under head coach Terry Allen, the team compiled a 12–2 record (5–1 in conference games) and won the Gateway Conference championship. Northern Iowa advanced to the NCAA Division I-AA playoffs, where they beat Eastern Washington in the first round and McNeese State in the quarterfinals before falling to Youngstown State in the semifinals. It was the first 12-win season in program history. Terry Allen was selected as the Gateway Conference and AFCA Region 5 coach of the year.

Linebacker William Freeney and wide receiver and return specialist Kenny Shedd were selected by the Associated Press, Sports Network, Football Gazette, and Kodak on the Division I-AA All-American team. Freeney, who tallied 18 sacks, 141 total tackles, and 20 tackles for loss, was also selected as the Gateway Conference defensive player of the years. Shedd led the team with 1,875 all-purpose yards and 978 receiving yards (33.72 yards per catch), returned four punts for touchdown, and gained 508 yards on 36 punt returns. Nine Northern Iowa players were honored as first-team players on the 1992 all-Gateway football team: Freeney; Shedd; defensive back Willie Beamon; linebacker Peter Burns; offensive tackle John Herrin; punter Tim Mosley; tight end Chris Nuss; placekicker Scott Obermeier; and defensive lineman Casey Smith. Three others were named to the second team. Burns led the team with 163 total tackles, and Beamon tallied 19 pass breakups and 8 interceptions. Quarterback Jay Johnson completed 175 of 336 passes for 2,937 yards.

The team played its home games at the UNI-Dome in Cedar Falls, Iowa.

== Schedule ==
Date	Time	Opponent	Rank	Site	Result	Attendance	Source
September 12	7:00 p.m.	at No. 10 McNeese State*	No. 3	Cowboy Stadium; Lake Charles, LA	W 21–18	17,765	
September 19	1:30 p.m.	Idaho State*	No. 4	UNI-Dome; Cedar Falls, IA	W 49–11	11,722	
September 26	1:05 p.m.	at Iowa State*	No. 4	Cyclone Stadium; Ames, IA	W 27–10	40,646	
October 3	1:30 p.m.	Illinois State^{†}	No. 2	UNI-Dome; Cedar Falls, IA	W 41–14	15,086	
October 10	6:30 p.m.	Western Kentucky*	No. 1	UNI-Dome; Cedar Falls, IA	W 34–6	11,255	
October 17	1:30 p.m.	at Southern Illinois	No. 1	McAndrew Stadium; Carbondale, IL	W 30–25	7,000	
October 24	6:30 p.m.	No. 2 Idaho*	No. 1	UNI-Dome; Cedar Falls, IA	W 27–26	16,324	
October 31	1:30 p.m.	at Indiana State	No. 1	Memorial Stadium; Terre Haute, IN	W 34–13	7,729	
November 7	1:30 p.m.	at Eastern Illinois	No. 1	O'Brien Stadium; Charleston, IL	L 15–21	8,948	
November 14	6:30 p.m.	No. 19 Western Illinois	No. 4	UNI-Dome; Cedar Falls, IA	W 37–6	14,552	
November 21	6:30 p.m.	Southwest Missouri State	No. 3	UNI-Dome; Cedar Falls, IA	W 37–12	16,324	
November 28		No. 14 Eastern Washington*	No. 3	UNI-Dome; Cedar Falls, IA (NCAA Division I-AA First Round)	W 17–14	13,149	
December 5		No. 11 McNeese State*	No. 3	UNI-Dome; Cedar Falls, IA (NCAA Division I-AA Quarterfinal)	W 29–7	13,375	
December 12		No. 7 Youngstown State*	No. 3	UNI-Dome; Cedar Falls, IA (NCAA Division I-AA Semifinal)	L 7–19	14,682	
*Non-conference game; ^{†}Homecoming; Rankings from NCAA Division I-AA Football Committee Poll released prior to the game; All times are in Central time

== Roster ==
1992 Northern Iowa Panthers football team roster
Players
Coaches
Offense

Pos.	#	Name	Class
OT	69	John Lee	Jr
WR	2	Tim Mosley	Jr
QB	7	Brett O’Donnell	So
WR	5	Kenny Shedd	Sr
QB	13	Kurt Warner	Jr

Defense

Pos.	#	Name	Class
CB	12	Willie Beamon	Sr
LB	40	Paul Wolf	So

Special teams

Pos.	#	Name	Class

Head coach

- Terry Allen

Coordinators/assistant coaches

Legend

- (C) Team captain
- (S) Suspended
- (I) Ineligible
- Injured
- Redshirt
