= 1992 Samford Bulldogs football team =

American college football season

1992 Samford Bulldogs football

NCAA Division I-AA First Round, L 21–56 at Delaware
- Conference: Independent
- Record: 9–3
- Head coach: Terry Bowden (6th season)
- Offensive coordinator: Jimbo Fisher (2nd season)
- Defensive coordinator: Jack Hines (6th season)
- Home stadium: Seibert Stadium

1992 NCAA Division I-AA independents football standings
| | Conf. | | | Overall |
| Team | W | L | T | W | | L | | T |
|---|---|---|---|---|---|---|---|---|
| No. 13 William & Mary | | – | | 9 | – | 2 | – | 0 |
| No. 7 Youngstown State ^ | | – | | 9 | – | 2 | – | 1 |
| No. 9 Samford ^ | | – | | 9 | – | 3 | – | 0 |
| Georgia Southern | | – | | 7 | – | 4 | – | 0 |
| No. 19 Liberty | | – | | 7 | – | 4 | – | 0 |
| UCF | | – | | 6 | – | 4 | – | 0 |
| Northeastern | | – | | 5 | – | 5 | – | 1 |
| Towson State | | – | | 5 | – | 5 | – | 0 |
| Western Kentucky | | – | | 4 | – | 6 | – | 0 |
| James Madison | | – | | 4 | – | 7 | – | 0 |
^ – NCAA Division I-AA playoff participant; Rankings from NCAA Division I-AA Football Committee poll

The 1992 Samford Bulldogs football team represented Samford University as an independent during the 1992 NCAA Division I-AA football season. Led by sixth-year head coach Terry Bowden, the Bulldogs compiled an overall record of 9–3. Samford advanced to the NCAA Division I-AA First Round and were defeated by Delaware.

== Schedule ==
| Date | Opponent | Rank | Site | Result | Attendance | Source |
|---|---|---|---|---|---|---|
| September 5 | West Georgia | | Seibert Stadium; Homewood, AL | W 44–16 | | |
| September 12 | at Auburn | No. 8 | Jordan-Hare Stadium; Auburn, AL | L 0–55 | 65,913 | |
| September 19 | at Tennessee Tech | | Tucker Stadium; Cookeville, TN | W 37–13 | | |
| September 26 | at Bethune–Cookman | | Municipal Stadium; Daytona Beach, FL | W 42–13 | 2,500 | |
| October 3 | Western Carolina | No. 18 | Seibert Stadium; Homewood, AL | W 30–6 | | |
| October 10 | No. 3 Eastern Kentucky | No. 17 | Seibert Stadium; Homewood, AL | W 46–14 | | |
| October 17 | Southeast Missouri State | No. 13 | Seibert Stadium; Homewood, AL | W 45–14 | | |
| October 31 | UAB | No. 8 | Seibert Stadium; Homewood, AL | W 49–3 | 6,156 | |
| November 7 | at Troy State | No. 8 | Veterans Memorial Stadium; Troy, AL | L 24–29 | 15,000 | |
| November 14 | at Tennessee–Martin | No. 12 | Pacer Stadium; Martin, TN | W 42–25 | | |
| November 21 | UCF | No. 9 | Seibert Stadium; Homewood, AL | W 20–13 | 4,987 | |
| November 28 | at No. 8 Delaware | No. 9 | Delaware Stadium; Newark, DE (NCAA Division I-AA First Round) | L 21–56 | 11,364 | |
Rankings from NCAA Division I-AA Football Committee Poll released prior to the game
