= 1992 UCF Knights football team =

American college football season

1992 UCF Knights football
- Conference: Independent
- Record: 6–4 (Note: The official NCAA Statistics, and the school, list a record of 6–4. The overall record including the exhibition game against Moscow is 7–4.)
- Head coach: Gene McDowell (8th season)
- Offensive coordinator: Mike Kruczek (8th season)
- Defensive coordinator: Ron McCrone (1st season)
- Home stadium: Florida Citrus Bowl

1992 NCAA Division I-AA independents football standings
	Conf.			Overall
Team	W	L	T	W		L		T
No. 13 William & Mary		–		9	–	2	–	0
No. 7 Youngstown State ^		–		9	–	2	–	1
No. 9 Samford ^		–		9	–	3	–	0
Georgia Southern		–		7	–	4	–	0
No. 19 Liberty		–		7	–	4	–	0
UCF		–		6	–	4	–	0
Northeastern		–		5	–	5	–	1
Towson State		–		5	–	5	–	0
Western Kentucky		–		4	–	6	–	0
James Madison		–		4	–	7	–	0
^ – NCAA Division I-AA playoff participant; Rankings from NCAA Division I-AA Football Committee poll

The 1992 UCF Knights football season was the fourteenth season for the team and eighth for Gene McDowell as the head coach of the Knights. McDowell's 1992 team posted 6–4 overall record (and one exhibition game win). During the 1992 season, Dr. John Hitt, UCF's fourth president, announced that the program would make the move to Division I-A (FBS) in 1996.

On October 3, the school made history by becoming the first team to play a team from Russia on American soil. The Knights played an exhibition game against the Moscow Bears, the Russia national American football team. The Knights prevailed by the score of 43–6 in front of 5,412 at the Citrus Bowl.

In their season opening game against Gardner-Webb, the Knights rushed for a school record 461 yards.

== Schedule ==
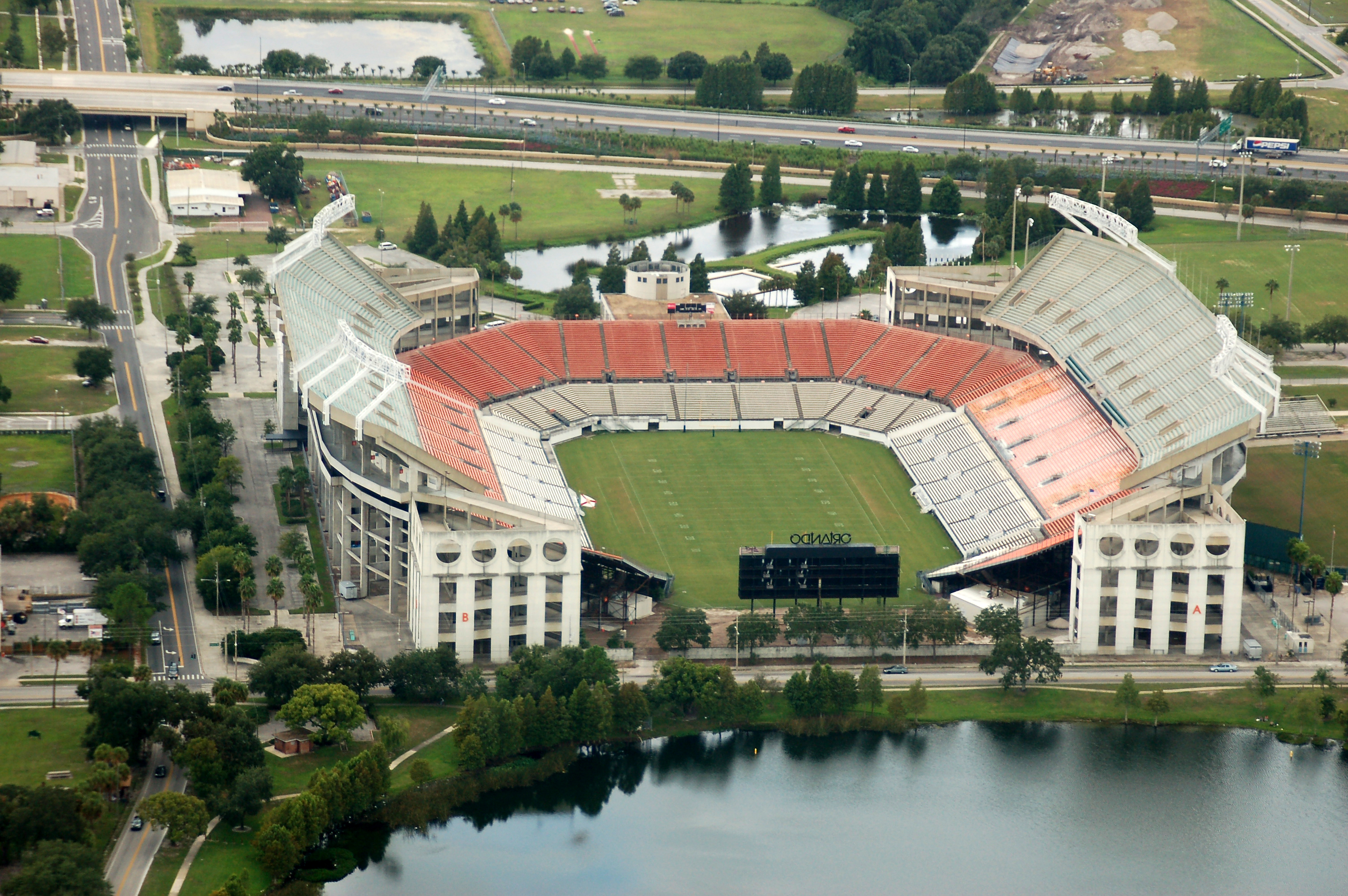
The Florida Citrus Bowl, the Knights' home field

Date	Opponent	Rank	Site	Result	Attendance	Source
September 5	Gardner–Webb		Florida Citrus Bowl; Orlando, FL	W 71–21	10,286	
September 12	Bethune–Cookman		Florida Citrus Bowl; Orlando, FL	W 28–3	12,075	
September 19	Troy State		Florida Citrus Bowl; Orlando, FL	L 16–20	7,755	
September 26	at Western Illinois		Hanson Field; Macomb, IL	W 35–22	9,764	
October 3	Moscow Bears (Russia national American football team)		Florida Citrus Bowl; Orlando, FL	W 43–6 (exhibition)	5,412	
October 17	Nicholls State		Florida Citrus Bowl; Orlando, FL	W 42–18	8,087	
October 24	at Western Kentucky	No. 19	L. T. Smith Stadium; Bowling Green, KY	L 36–50	10,589	
October 31	at Liberty		Liberty University Stadium; Lynchburg, VA	L 28–31	8,100	
November 7	Buffalo		Florida Citrus Bowl; Orlando, FL	W 63–21	9,067	
November 14	James Madison		Florida Citrus Bowl; Orlando, FL	W 41–37	6,681	
November 21	at No. 9 Samford		Seibert Stadium; Homewood, AL	L 13–20	4,987	
Rankings from NCAA Division I-AA Football Committee Poll released prior to the game
