= 1992 NCAA Division I-AA football season =

American college football season

1992 NCAA Division I-AA season

Regular season
- Number of teams: 89
- Duration: September 5–November 21
- Payton Award: Michael Payton

Playoff
- Duration: November 28–December 19
- Championship date: December 19, 1992
- Championship site: Marshall University Stadium; Huntington, West Virginia
- Champion: Marshall

NCAA Division I-AA football seasons
- «1991 1993»

The 1992 NCAA Division I-AA football season, part of college football in the United States organized by the National Collegiate Athletic Association at the Division I-AA level, began on September 5, 1992, and concluded with the 1992 NCAA Division I-AA Football Championship Game on December 19, 1992, in Huntington, West Virginia. The Marshall Thundering Herd defeated the Youngstown State Penguins by a score of 31–28. It was the second consecutive year that Marshall and Youngstown State faced off in the I-AA title game.

== Conference changes and new programs ==
Prior to the season, the Gateway Collegiate Athletic Conference, otherwise a women's sports league but sponsoring football as its only men's sport since the 1985 collapse of the football side of the Missouri Valley Conference (MVC), merged into the MVC. The football league became the standalone Gateway Football Conference, forerunner of the present-day Missouri Valley Football Conference (MVFC).

School	1991 Conference	1992 Conference
Arkansas State	I-AA Independent	I-A Independent
Nevada	Big Sky (I-AA)	Big West (I-A)
Tennessee–Martin	D-II Independent	Ohio Valley

== Conference standings ==
1992 Big Sky Conference football standings
	Conf.					Overall
Team	W		L		T	W		L		T
No. 5 Idaho +^	6	–	1	–	0	9	–	3	–	0
No. 14 Eastern Washington +^	6	–	1	–	0	7	–	4	–	0
Montana	4	–	3	–	0	6	–	5	–	0
Weber State	4	–	3	–	0	6	–	5	–	0
Boise State	3	–	4	–	0	5	–	6	–	0
Montana State	2	–	5	–	0	4	–	7	–	0
Northern Arizona	2	–	5	–	0	4	–	7	–	0
Idaho State	1	–	6	–	0	3	–	8	–	0
+ – Conference co-champions; ^ – NCAA Division I-AA playoff participant; Rankings from NCAA Division I-AA Football Committee poll

1992 Gateway Football Conference standings
	Conf.					Overall
Team	W		L		T	W		L		T
No. 3 Northern Iowa $^	5	–	1	–	0	12	–	2	–	0
No. 20 Western Illinois	4	–	2	–	0	7	–	4	–	0
Southwest Missouri State	4	–	2	–	0	6	–	5	–	0
Eastern Illinois	2	–	4	–	0	5	–	6	–	0
Illinois State	2	–	4	–	0	5	–	6	–	0
Indiana State	2	–	4	–	0	4	–	7	–	0
Southern Illinois	2	–	4	–	0	4	–	7	–	0
$ – Conference champion; ^ – NCAA Division I-AA playoff participant; Rankings from NCAA Division I-AA Football Committee poll

1992 Ivy League football standings
	Conf.					Overall
Team	W		L		T	W		L		T
Dartmouth +	6	–	1	–	0	8	–	2	–	0
Princeton +	6	–	1	–	0	8	–	2	–	0
Penn	5	–	2	–	0	7	–	3	–	0
Cornell	4	–	3	–	0	7	–	3	–	0
Harvard	3	–	4	–	0	3	–	7	–	0
Yale	2	–	5	–	0	4	–	6	–	0
Columbia	2	–	5	–	0	3	–	7	–	0
Brown	0	–	7	–	0	0	–	10	–	0
+ – Conference co-champions

1992 Mid-Eastern Athletic Conference football standings
	Conf.					Overall
Team	W		L		T	W		L		T
No. 17 North Carolina A&T $^	5	–	1	–	0	9	–	3	–	0
No. 15 Florida A&M	4	–	2	–	0	7	–	4	–	0
South Carolina State	4	–	2	–	0	7	–	4	–	0
Howard	3	–	3	–	0	7	–	4	–	0
Delaware State	3	–	3	–	0	6	–	5	–	0
Bethune–Cookman	2	–	4	–	0	4	–	7	–	0
Morgan State	0	–	6	–	0	2	–	9	–	0
$ – Conference champion; ^ – NCAA Division I-AA playoff participant; Rankings from NCAA Division I-AA Football Committee poll

1992 Ohio Valley Conference football standings
	Conf.					Overall
Team	W		L		T	W		L		T
No. 4 Middle Tennessee $^	8	–	0	–	0	10	–	3	–	0
No. 12 Eastern Kentucky ^	7	–	1	–	0	9	–	3	–	0
Tennessee Tech	6	–	2	–	0	7	–	4	–	0
Tennessee State	5	–	3	–	0	5	–	6	–	0
Morehead State	3	–	5	–	0	3	–	8	–	0
Austin Peay	2	–	6	–	0	3	–	8	–	0
Tennessee–Martin	2	–	6	–	0	3	–	8	–	0
Southeast Missouri State	2	–	6	–	0	2	–	9	–	0
Murray State	1	–	7	–	0	2	–	9	–	0
$ – Conference champion; ^ – NCAA Division I-AA playoff participant; Rankings from NCAA Division I-AA Football Committee poll

1992 Patriot League football standings
	Conf.					Overall
Team	W		L		T	W		L		T
Lafayette $	5	–	0	–	0	8	–	3	–	0
Holy Cross	4	–	1	–	0	6	–	5	–	0
Colgate	2	–	3	–	0	4	–	7	–	0
Lehigh	2	–	3	–	0	3	–	8	–	0
Bucknell	1	–	4	–	0	4	–	7	–	0
Fordham	1	–	4	–	0	1	–	9	–	0
$ – Conference champion

1992 Southern Conference football standings
	Conf.					Overall
Team	W		L		T	W		L		T
No. 1 The Citadel $^	6	–	1	–	0	11	–	2	–	0
No. 6 Marshall ^	5	–	2	–	0	12	–	3	–	0
No. 16 Appalachian State ^	5	–	2	–	0	7	–	5	–	0
Western Carolina	5	–	2	–	0	7	–	4	–	0
Furman	4	–	3	–	0	6	–	5	–	0
East Tennessee State	2	–	5	–	0	5	–	6	–	0
VMI	1	–	6	–	0	3	–	8	–	0
Chattanooga	0	–	7	–	0	2	–	9	–	0
$ – Conference champion; ^ – NCAA Division I-AA playoff participant; Rankings from NCAA Division I-AA Football Committee poll

1992 Southland Conference football standings
	Conf.					Overall
Team	W		L		T	W		L		T
No. 1 Northeast Louisiana $^	7	–	0	–	0	10	–	3	–	0
No. 11 McNeese State ^	6	–	1	–	0	9	–	4	–	0
Northwestern State	4	–	3	–	0	7	–	4	–	0
Sam Houston State	3	–	2	–	2	6	–	3	–	2
North Texas	3	–	4	–	0	4	–	7	–	0
Southwest Texas State	2	–	4	–	1	5	–	5	–	1
Stephen F. Austin	1	–	6	–	0	3	–	8	–	0
Nicholls State	0	–	6	–	1	1	–	9	–	1
$ – Conference champion; ^ – NCAA Division I-AA playoff participant; Rankings from NCAA Division I-AA Football Committee poll

1992 Southwestern Athletic Conference football standings
	Conf.					Overall
Team	W		L		T	W		L		T
No. 18 Alcorn State $^	7	–	0	–	0	7	–	4	–	0
Grambling State	6	–	1	–	0	10	–	2	–	0
Jackson State	4	–	3	–	0	7	–	4	–	0
Alabama State	3	–	4	–	0	5	–	6	–	0
Southern	3	–	4	–	0	5	–	6	–	0
Texas Southern	3	–	4	–	0	5	–	6	–	0
Mississippi Valley State	2	–	5	–	0	4	–	5	–	0
Prairie View A&M	0	–	7	–	0	0	–	11	–	0
$ – Conference champion; ^ – NCAA Division I-AA playoff participant; Rankings from NCAA Division I-AA Football Committee poll

1992 Yankee Conference football standings
	Conf.					Overall
Team	W		L		T	W		L		T
No. 8 Delaware $^	7	–	1	–	0	11	–	3	–	0
No. 10 Villanova ^	6	–	2	–	0	9	–	3	–	0
UMass	5	–	3	–	0	7	–	3	–	0
Richmond	5	–	3	–	0	7	–	4	–	0
Maine	4	–	4	–	0	6	–	5	–	0
Connecticut	4	–	4	–	0	6	–	5	–	0
New Hampshire	3	–	5	–	0	5	–	5	–	1
Boston University	2	–	6	–	0	3	–	8	–	0
Rhode Island	0	–	8	–	0	1	–	10	–	0
$ – Conference champion; ^ – NCAA Division I-AA playoff participant; Rankings from NCAA Division I-AA Football Committee poll

1992 NCAA Division I-AA independents football standings
	Conf.			Overall
Team	W	L	T	W		L		T
No. 13 William & Mary		–		9	–	2	–	0
No. 7 Youngstown State ^		–		9	–	2	–	1
No. 9 Samford ^		–		9	–	3	–	0
Georgia Southern		–		7	–	4	–	0
No. 19 Liberty		–		7	–	4	–	0
UCF		–		6	–	4	–	0
Northeastern		–		5	–	5	–	1
Towson State		–		5	–	5	–	0
Western Kentucky		–		4	–	6	–	0
James Madison		–		4	–	7	–	0
^ – NCAA Division I-AA playoff participant; Rankings from NCAA Division I-AA Football Committee poll

== Conference champions ==
This is a listing of conference champions.

Conference	Champion
Atlantic 10 Conference	Delaware
Big Sky Conference	Idaho and Eastern Washington
Ivy League	Dartmouth and Princeton
Gateway Football Conference	Northern Iowa
Mid-Eastern Athletic Conference	North Carolina A&T
Ohio Valley Conference	Middle Tennessee
Patriot League	Lafayette
Southern Conference	The Citadel
Southland Conference	Northeast Louisiana
Southwestern Athletic Conference	Alcorn State

== Postseason ==
Only the top four teams in the field were seeded, and thus assured of home games in their first-round games. The site of the title game, Marshall University Stadium, had been predetermined months before the playoffs began.

=== NCAA Division I-AA playoff bracket ===
First Round; November 28; Campus sites
Alcorn State	27
1	Northeast Louisiana*	78
Samford	21
Delaware*	56
Appalachian State	10
4	Middle Tennessee*	35
Eastern Kentucky	0
Marshall*	44
North Carolina A&T	0
2	The Citadel*	44
Villanova	20
Youngstown State*	23
Eastern Washington	14
3	Northern Iowa*	17
McNeese State	23
Idaho*	20

Quarterfinals; December 5 Campus sites
1	Northeast Louisiana*	18
Delaware	41
4	Middle Tennessee	21
Marshall*	35
2	The Citadel*	17
Youngstown State	42
3	Northern Iowa*	29
McNeese State	7

Semifinals; December 12; Campus sites
Delaware	7
Marshall*	28
Youngstown State	19
3	Northern Iowa*	7

National Championship Game; December 19; Marshall University Stadium; Huntington, West Virginia
Marshall	31
Youngstown State	28

* Next to team name denotes host institution

== Final poll standings ==
NCAA
Ranking	Team
1	The Citadel
1	Northeast Louisiana
3	Northern Iowa
4	Middle Tennessee
5	Idaho
6	Marshall
7	Youngstown State
8	Delaware
9	Samford
10	Villanova
11	McNeese State
12	Eastern Kentucky
13	William & Mary
14	Eastern Washington
15	Florida A&M
16	Appalachian State
17	North Carolina A&T
18	Alcorn State
19	Liberty
20	Western Illinois
