= 1992 NCAA Division I-AA football rankings =

The 1992 NCAA Division I-AA football rankings are from the NCAA Division I-AA football committee, which in the 1992 season was composed of four components. One of these components was the Sports Network poll of 49 Division I-AA head coaches, athletic directors, sports information directors and media members, which was sometimes published separately.

== Legend ==
| | Increase in ranking |
| | Decrease in ranking |
| | Not ranked previous week |
| (#–#) | Win–loss record |
| (Italics) | Number of first place votes |
| т | Tied with team above or below also with this symbol |

== NCAA Division I-AA Football Committee poll ==
Currently, the following polls are only ones available. A preseason poll was also released.

| | Week 1 Sept 7 | Week 2 Sept 14 | Week 3 Sept 21 | Week 4 Sept 28 | Week 5 Oct 5 | Week 6 Oct 12 | Week 7 Oct 19 | Week 8 Oct 26 | Week 9 Nov 2 | Week 10 Nov 9 | Week 11 Nov 16 | Week 12 Nov 23 | |
|---|---|---|---|---|---|---|---|---|---|---|---|---|---|
| 1. | Marshall (1–0) | Youngstown State (2–0) (3) | Youngstown State (3–0) (3) | Marshall (3–0) (4) | Northern Iowa (4–0–0–) (4) | Northern Iowa (5–0) (4) | Northern Iowa (6–0) (4) | Northern Iowa (7–0) (4) | Northern Iowa (4) (8–0) | Northeast Louisiana (3) (7–2) | The Citadel (9–1) | The Citadel (2) (10–1) | 1. |
| 2. | Youngstown State (1–0) | Marshall (2–0) (1) | Marshall (3–0) (1) | Northern Iowa (3–0) | Villanova (4–0) | Villanova (5–0) | Idaho (6–0) | Marshall (6–1) | Idaho (7–1) | The Citadel (1) (8–1) | Northeast Louisiana (8–2) | Northeast Louisiana (2) (9–2) | 2. |
| 3. | Northern Iowa (0–0) | Villanova (2–0) | Villanova (3–0) | Villanova (3–0) | Eastern Kentucky (4–0) | Idaho (5–0) | Marshall (5–1) | Idaho (6–1) | The Citadel (7–1) | Delaware (8–1) | Northern Iowa (9–1) | Northern Iowa (10–1) | 3. |
| 4. | Eastern Kentucky (1–0) | Northern Iowa (1–0) | Northern Iowa (2–0) | Eastern Kentucky (3–0) | Idaho (4–0) | The Citadel (6–0) | Middle Tennessee (5–1) | Middle Tennessee (6–1) | Northeast Louisiana (6–2) | Northern Iowa (8–1) | Middle Tennessee (8–2) | Middle Tennessee (9–2) | 4. |
| 5. | Middle Tennessee (1–0) | Eastern Kentucky (1–0) | Eastern Kentucky (2–0) | Idaho (3–0) | The Citadel (5–0) | Marshall (4–1) | Northeast Louisiana (5–2) | Northeast Louisiana (6–2) | Marshall (6–2) | Middle Tennessee (7–2) | Idaho (8–2) | Idaho (9–2) | 5. |
| 6. | Villanova (1–0) | Idaho (2–0) | Idaho (3–0) | The Citadel (4–0) | Marshall (3–1) | Youngstown State (5–1) | The Citadel (6–1) | The Citadel (7–1) | Delaware (7–1) | Idaho (7–2) | Marshall (7–3) | Marshall (8–3) | 6. |
| 7. | Northeast Louisiana (1–0) | Alabama State (1–0) | Delaware (2–0) | Youngstown State (3–1) | Youngstown State (4–1) | Middle Tennessee (4–1) | Delaware (5–1) | Delaware (6–1) | Middle Tennessee (6–2) | Youngstown State (7–2) | Youngstown State (7–2–1) | Youngstown State (8–2–1) | 7. |
| 8. | Samford (1–0) | Delaware (1–0) | The Citadel (3–0) | Middle Tennessee (2–1) | Middle Tennessee State (3–1) | Northeast Louisiana (4–2) | Samford (6–1) | Samford (6–1) | Samford (7–1) | Florida A&M (7–2) | Villanova (8–2) | Delaware (9–2) | 8. |
| 9. | Delaware (0–0) | The Citadel (2–0) | Chattanooga (2–0) | Northeast Louisiana (2–2) | Northeast Louisiana (3–2) | Florida A&M (5–1) | Villanova (5–1) | Richmond (6–1) | Youngstown State (6–2) | Villanova (7–2) | Samford (8–2) | Samford (9–2) | 9. |
| 10. | McNeese State (1–0) | Northeast Louisiana (1–1) | Middle Tennessee (1–1) | William & Mary (3–0) | William & Mary (4–0) | William & Mary (5–0) | William & Mary (6–0) | William & Mary (6–1) | Florida A&M (6–2) | Marshall (6–3) | Delaware (8–2) | Villanova (9–2) | 10. |
| 11. | Furman (1–0) | Chattanooga (2–0) | Southwest Missouri State (2–1) | Florida A&M (3–1) | Florida A&M (4–1) | Eastern Kentucky (4–1) | Richmond (5–1) | Youngstown State (5–2) | Villanova (6–2) | Southwest Missouri State (6–3) | McNeese State (7–3) | McNeese State (8–3) | 11. |
| 12. | The Citadel (1–0) | Middle Tennessee (1–1) | Northeast Louisiana (1–2) | Delaware (2–1) | Delaware (3–1) | Delaware (4–1) | Southwest Texas State (4–2) | Florida A&M (5–2) | Southwest Missouri State (5–3) | Samford (7–2) | Eastern Kentucky (8–2) | Eastern Kentucky (9–2) | 12. |
| 13. | Idaho (1–0) | Florida A&M (1–0) | Furman (2–1) | McNeese State (2–2) | McNeese State (2–2) | Samford (5–1) | Youngstown State (5–2) | Southwest Missouri State (5–3) | Richmond (6–2) | McNeese State (6–3) | William & Mary (8–2) | William & Mary (9–2) | 13. |
| 14. | Appalachian State (0–1) | Holy Cross (0–1) | William & Mary (2–0) | Richmond (2–1) | Richmond (3–1) | Richmond (4–1) | Southwest Missouri State (4–3) | Villanova (5–2) | McNeese State (5–3) | Georgia Southern (7–2) | Eastern Washington (7–3) | Eastern Washington (7–3) | 14. |
| 15. | James Madison (0–1) | McNeese State (1–1) | Alcorn State (2–0) | North Carolina A&T (4–0) | North Carolina A&T (5–0) | Southwest Texas State (4–2) | Florida A&M (5–2) | McNeese State (4–3) | Eastern Kentucky (6–2) | Eastern Kentucky (7–2) | Florida A&M (7–3) | Florida A&M (7–3) | 15. |
| 16. | Florida A&M (1–0) | Montana (1–1) | Southwest Texas State (2–1) | Southwest Texas State (2–2) | Southwest Missouri State (3–2) | Eastern Washington (4–1) | Boise State (5–2) | Eastern Kentucky (5–2) | Georgia Southern (6–2) | UMass (7–1) | Western Carolina (7–3) | Appalachian State (7–4) | 16. |
| 17. | Alcorn State (1–0) | Southwest Missouri State (1–1) | Montana (1–2) | Southwest Missouri State (2–2) | Samford (4–1) | Southwest Missouri State (3–3) | Eastern Kentucky (4–2) | Delaware State (6–1) | William & Mary (6–2) | North Carolina A&T (8–1) | Princeton (8–1) | North Carolina A&T (9–2) | 17. |
| 18. | Holy Cross (0–0) | William & Mary (1–0) | Alabama State (1–1) | Samford (2–2) | Southwest Texas State (3–2) | North Carolina A&T (5–1) | North Carolina A&T (5–1) | North Carolina A&T (6–1) | Eastern Washington (6–2) | William & Mary (7–2) | Appalachian State (6–4) | Alcorn State (7–3) | 18. |
| 19. | Montana (0–1) | Furman (1–1) | McNeese State (1–2) | Chattanooga (2–1) | Georgia Southern (3–1) | Boise State (4–2) | UCF (4–1) | Eastern Washington (5–2) | North Carolina A&T (7–1) | Western Illinois (7–3) | Richmond (7–3) | Liberty (7–4) | 19. |
| 20. | Chattanooga (1–0) | Southwest Texas State (2–0) | Florida A&M (2–1) | Eastern Washington (2–1); Georgia Southern (2–1) | Eastern Washington (3–1) | Jackson State (5–1) | Jackson State (6–1); Eastern Washington (4–2) | UMass (5–1) | UMass (6–1) | Eastern Washington (6–3); Princeton (7–1) | Georgia Southern (7–3); UMass (7–2) | Western Illinois (7–4) | 20. |
| | Week 1 Sept 7 | Week 2 Sept 14 | Week 3 Sept 21 | Week 4 Sept 28 | Week 5 Oct 5 | Week 6 Oct 12 | Week 7 Oct 19 | Week 8 Oct 26 | Week 9 Nov 2 | Week 10 Nov 9 | Week 11 Nov 16 | Week 12 Nov 23 | |
| | | Dropped: 8 Samford; 14 Appalachian State; 15 James Madison; 17 Alcorn State | Dropped: 14 Holy Cross | Dropped: 13 Furman; 15 Alcorn State; 17 Montana; 18 Alabama State | Dropped: 19 Chattanooga | Dropped: 19 Georgia Southern; 20 Eastern Washington | None | Dropped: 12 Southwest Texas State; 16 Boise State; 19 UCF; 20 Jackson State | Dropped: 17 Delaware State | Dropped: 15 Eastern Kentucky | Dropped: 13 Southwest Missouri State; 17 North Carolina A&T; 19 Western Illinois | Dropped: 16 Western Carolina; 17 Princeton; 19 Richmond; 20 Georgia Southern; 20 UMass | |
