= 1992 NCAA Division I-AA Football Championship Game =

College football game

1992 NCAA Division I-AA Football Championship
- I-AA National Championship Game
Youngstown State Penguins	Marshall Thundering Herd
(11–2–1)	(11–3)
Independent	SoCon
28	31
Head coach: Jim Tressel	Head coach: Jim Donnan
NCAA / Seed; 7 / —	NCAA / Seed; 6 / —
	1	2	3	4	Total
Youngstown State	0	0	14	14	28
Marshall	0	14	14	3	31
- Date: December 19, 1992
- Season: 1992
- Stadium: Marshall University Stadium
- Location: Huntington, West Virginia
- Favorite: Marshall by 8.5
- Attendance: 31,304

United States TV coverage
- Network: CBS Sports
- Announcers: Jim Nantz (play-by-play), John Robinson (color)

The 1992 NCAA Division I-AA Football Championship Game was a postseason college football game between the Youngstown State Penguins and the Marshall Thundering Herd. The game was played on December 19, 1992, at Marshall University Stadium in Huntington, West Virginia. The culminating game of the 1992 NCAA Division I-AA football season, it was won by Marshall, 31–28. The game was a rematch of the prior season's championship game.

== Teams ==
The participants of the Championship Game were the finalists of the 1992 I-AA Playoffs, which began with a 16-team bracket. The site of the title game, Marshall University Stadium, had been predetermined months earlier.

=== Youngstown State Penguins ===
Youngstown State finished their regular season with an 8–2–1 record. Unseeded in the tournament and ranked seventh in the final NCAA I-AA in-house poll, the Penguins defeated Villanova, second-seed The Citadel, and third-seed Northern Iowa to reach the final. This was the second appearance, both consecutively and overall, for Youngstown State in a Division I-AA championship game, having won in 1991.

=== Marshall Thundering Herd ===
Marshall finished their regular season with an 8–3 record (5–2 in conference). Unseeded and ranked sixth in the final NCAA I-AA in-house poll, the Thundering Herd defeated Eastern Kentucky, fourth-seed Middle Tennessee, and Delaware to reach the final. This was the third appearance overall, and second consecutively, for Marshall in a Division I-AA championship game, having lost in 1987 and 1991.

== Game summary ==
After a scoreless first quarter, Marshall led 14–0 at halftime, and extended their lead to 28–0 with 5:46 left in the third quarter. Youngstown State then rallied, cutting the lead to 28–14 by the end of the third quarter, and tying the game with 2:28 left in the fourth quarter. Marshall then drove from their 19-yard-line to the Youngstown State 5-yard-line, and senior kicker Willy Merrick made a 22-yard-field goal with seven seconds left to play, providing the winning points for Marshall. It was Merrick's first collegiate field goal, as the team's usual kicker, Merrick's sophomore brother David, was suspended for the game due to missing a practice.

=== Scoring summary ===
Scoring summary

Quarter	Time	Drive			Team	Scoring information	Score	
Quarter	Time	Plays	Yards	TOP	Team	Scoring information	YSU	MU
2	10:33				MU	Mike Bartrum 6-yard touchdown reception from Michael Payton, Willy Merrick kick good	0	7
2	3:30	7	28		MU	Orlando Hatchett 5-yard touchdown run, Merrick kick good	0	14
3					MU	Glenn Pedro 1-yard touchdown run, Merrick kick good	0	21
3	5:46				MU	Hatchett 22-yard touchdown reception from Payton, Merrick kick good	0	28
3	3:41		57	2:05	YSU	Herb Williams 30-yard touchdown reception from Nick Cochran, Jeff Wilkins kick good	7	28
3	0:16		65	0:40	YSU	Tamron Smith 4-yard touchdown run, Wilkins kick good	14	28
4	12:04	4	49	1:19	YSU	Smith 1-yard touchdown run, Wilkins kick good	21	28
4	2:28				YSU	Smith 10-yard touchdown run, Wilkins kick good	28	28
4	0:07		76		MU	22-yard field goal by Merrick	28	31
"TOP" = time of possession. For other American football terms, see Glossary of American football.							28	31

=== Game statistics ===
	1	2	3	4	Total
Penguins	0	0	14	14	28
Thundering Herd	0	14	14	3	31

Statistics	YSU	MU
First downs	17	26
Plays–yards	65–372	82–455
Rushes–yards	34–116	42–185
Passing yards	256	270
Passing: comp–att–int	18–31–1	25–40–2
Time of possession	27:57	32:03

Team	Category	Player	Statistics
Youngstown State	Passing	Nick Cochran	18–31, 256 yds, 1 TD, 1 INT
Youngstown State	Rushing	Tamron Smith	20 car, 82 yds, 3 TD
Youngstown State	Receiving	Herb Williams	5 rec, 105 yds, 1 TD
Marshall	Passing	Michael Payton	25–39, 270 yds, 2 TD, 2 INT
Marshall	Rushing	Orlando Hatchett	15 car, 112 yds, 1 TD
Marshall	Receiving	Troy Brown	10 rec, 115 yds
