= 1992 Marshall Thundering Herd football team =

American college football season

1992 Marshall Thundering Herd football

NCAA Division I-AA champion

NCAA Division I-AA Championship Game, W 31–28 vs. Youngstown State
- Conference: Southern Conference
- Record: 12–3 (5–2 SoCon)
- Head coach: Jim Donnan (3rd season)
- Offensive coordinator: Greg Briner (2nd season)
- Defensive coordinator: Mickey Matthews (3rd season)
- Captains: Mike Bartrum; Jim Durning; Bob Lane; Byran Litton; Michael Payton; Phil Ratliff; Donahue Stephenson
- Home stadium: Marshall University Stadium

Uniform
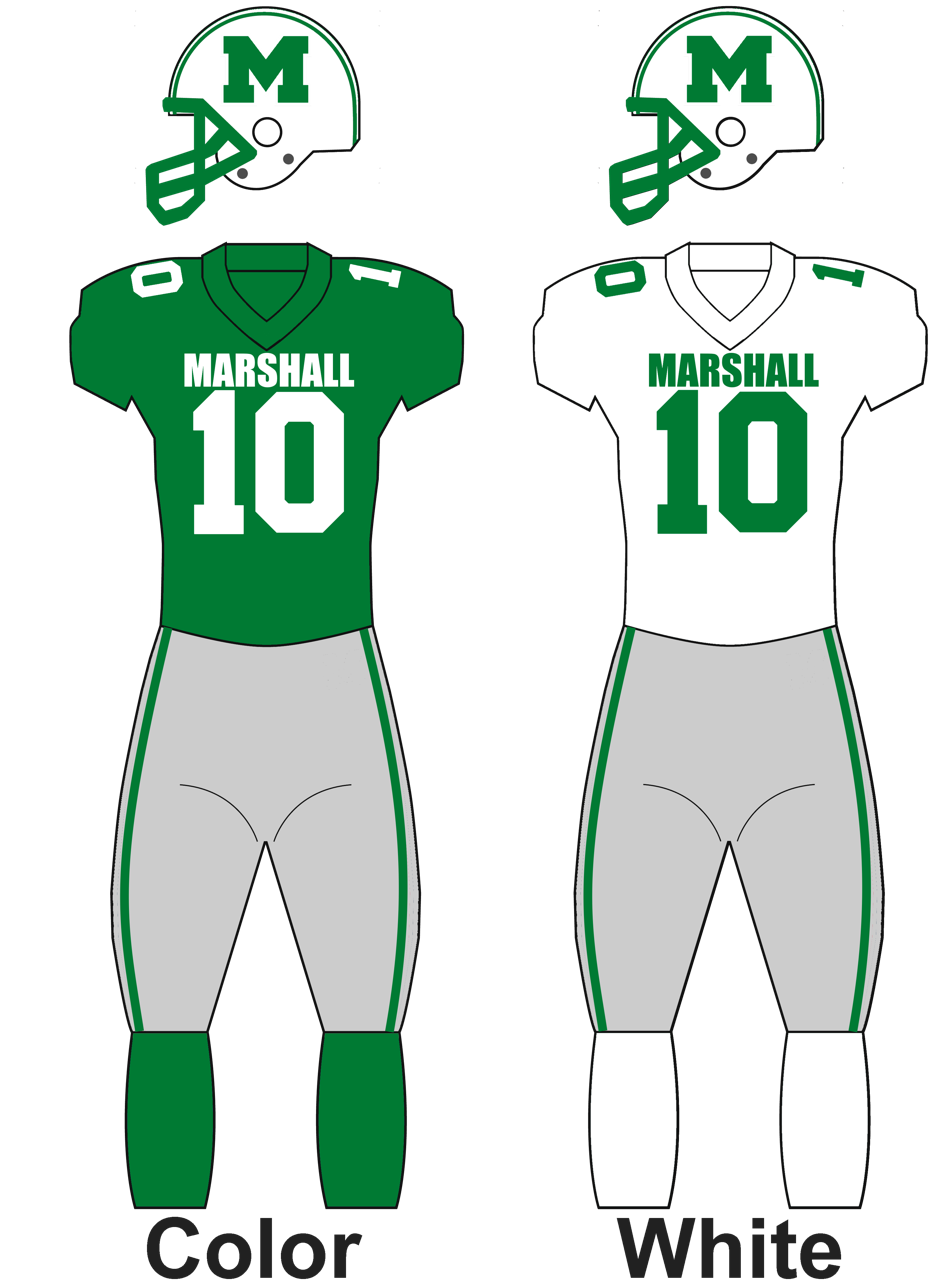

1992 Southern Conference football standings
| | Conf. | | | | | Overall |
| Team | W | | L | | T | W | | L | | T |
|---|---|---|---|---|---|---|---|---|---|---|
| No. 1 The Citadel $^ | 6 | – | 1 | – | 0 | 11 | – | 2 | – | 0 |
| No. 6 Marshall ^ | 5 | – | 2 | – | 0 | 12 | – | 3 | – | 0 |
| No. 16 Appalachian State ^ | 5 | – | 2 | – | 0 | 7 | – | 5 | – | 0 |
| Western Carolina | 5 | – | 2 | – | 0 | 7 | – | 4 | – | 0 |
| Furman | 4 | – | 3 | – | 0 | 6 | – | 5 | – | 0 |
| East Tennessee State | 2 | – | 5 | – | 0 | 5 | – | 6 | – | 0 |
| VMI | 1 | – | 6 | – | 0 | 3 | – | 8 | – | 0 |
| Chattanooga | 0 | – | 7 | – | 0 | 2 | – | 9 | – | 0 |
$ – Conference champion; ^ – NCAA Division I-AA playoff participant; Rankings from NCAA Division I-AA Football Committee poll

The 1992 Marshall Thundering Herd football team represented Marshall University as a member of the Southern Conference (SoCon) during the 1992 NCAA Division I-AA football season. Led by third-year head coach Jim Donnan, the Thundering Herd compiled an overall record of 12–3 with a mark of 5–2 in conference play, placing in a three-way tie for second in the SoCon. Marshall advanced to the NCAA Division I-AA Championship playoffs, where they beat Eastern Kentucky in the first round, Middle Tennessee State in the quarterfinals, and Delaware and Youngstown State in the NCAA Division I-AA Championship Game to win the program's first national championship. The team played home games at Marshall University Stadium in Huntington, West Virginia.

== Schedule ==
| Date | Time | Opponent | Rank | Site | TV | Result | Attendance | Source |
|---|---|---|---|---|---|---|---|---|
| September 5 | 7:00 pm | Morehead State* | No. 2 | Marshall University Stadium; Huntington, WV | | W 49–7 | 27,062 | |
| September 12 | 7:00 pm | Eastern Illinois* | No. 2 | Marshall University Stadium; Huntington, WV | | W 63–28 | 25,556 | |
| September 19 | 1:30 pm | at VMI | No. 2 | Alumni Memorial Field; Lexington, VA | | W 34–16 | 9,800 | |
| October 3 | 2:00 pm | at Missouri* | No. 1 | Faurot Field; Columbia, MO | | L 21–44 | 39,644 | |
| October 10 | 7:00 pm | Furman | No. 6 | Marshall University Stadium; Huntington, WV | SSN | W 48–6 | 28,272 | |
| October 17 | 4:00 pm | at No. 4 The Citadel | No. 5 | Johnson Hagood Stadium; Charleston, SC | SSN | W 34–13 | 23,025 | |
| October 24 | 4:00 pm | Chattanooga | No. 3 | Marshall University Stadium; Huntington, WV | SSN | W 52–23 | 21,135 | |
| October 31 | 1:30 pm | at Western Carolina | No. 2 | E. J. Whitmire Stadium; Cullowhee, NC | | L 30–38 | 9,180 | |
| November 7 | 1:00 pm | Appalachian State^{†} | No. 5 | Marshall University Stadium; Huntington, WV (rivalry) | SSN | L 34–37 | 21,467 | |
| November 14 | 1:00 pm | Tennessee Tech* | No. 10 | Marshall University Stadium; Huntington, WV | SSN | W 52–14 | 15,388 | |
| November 21 | 2:00 pm | at East Tennessee State | No. 6 | Memorial Center; Johnson City, TN | | W 49–10 | 5,002 | |
| November 28 | 1:00 pm | No. 12 Eastern Kentucky* | No. 6 | Marshall University Stadium; Huntington, WV (NCAA Division I-AA First Round) | | W 44–10 | 16,598 | |
| December 5 | 1:00 pm | No. 4 Middle Tennessee State* | No. 6 | Marshall University Stadium; Huntington, WV (NCAA Division I-AA Quarterfinal) | SSN | W 35–21 | 14,011 | |
| December 12 | 1:00 pm | No. 8 Delaware* | No. 6 | Marshall University Stadium; Huntington, WV (NCAA Division I-AA Semifinal) | SSN | W 28–7 | 16,323 | |
| December 19 | 12:00 pm | No. 7 Youngstown State* | No. 6 | Marshall University Stadium; Huntington, WV (NCAA Division I-AA Championship Game) | CBS | W 31–28 | 31,304 | |
*Non-conference game; ^{†}Homecoming; Rankings from NCAA Division I-AA Football Committee Poll released prior to the game; All times are in Eastern time

== Roster ==
1992 Marshall Thundering Herd football team roster
Players
Coaches
Offense

| Pos. | # | Name | Class |
|---|---|---|---|
| TE | 19 | Mike Bartrum | Sr |
| WR | 8 | Troy Brown | Sr |
| WR | 34 | Melvin Cunningham | Fr |
| QB | 18 | Chad O'Shea | Fr |
| RB | 36 | Chris Parker | Fr |
| QB | 14 | Michael Payton | Sr |

Defense

| Pos. | # | Name | Class |
|---|---|---|---|
| DL | 86 | Billy Lyon | Fr |

Special teams

| Pos. | # | Name | Class |

Head coach

- Jim Donnan

Coordinators/assistant coaches

Legend

- (C) Team captain
- (S) Suspended
- (I) Ineligible
- Injured
- Redshirt

== Team players drafted in the NFL ==
The following players were selected in the 1993 NFL draft.

| Player | Position | Round | Pick | Franchise |
| Troy Brown | Wide receiver | 8 | 198 | New England Patriots |

== Awards and honors ==
- Michael Payton, Walter Payton Award
