= 1992 Appalachian State Mountaineers football team =

American college football season

1992 Appalachian State Mountaineers football

NCAA Division I-AA First Round, L 10–35 vs. Middle Tennessee
- Conference: Southern Conference
- Record: 7–5 (5–2 SoCon)
- Head coach: Jerry Moore (4th season)
- Home stadium: Kidd Brewer Stadium

1992 Southern Conference football standings
	Conf.					Overall
Team	W		L		T	W		L		T
No. 1 The Citadel $^	6	–	1	–	0	11	–	2	–	0
No. 6 Marshall ^	5	–	2	–	0	12	–	3	–	0
No. 16 Appalachian State ^	5	–	2	–	0	7	–	5	–	0
Western Carolina	5	–	2	–	0	7	–	4	–	0
Furman	4	–	3	–	0	6	–	5	–	0
East Tennessee State	2	–	5	–	0	5	–	6	–	0
VMI	1	–	6	–	0	3	–	8	–	0
Chattanooga	0	–	7	–	0	2	–	9	–	0
$ – Conference champion; ^ – NCAA Division I-AA playoff participant; Rankings from NCAA Division I-AA Football Committee poll

The 1992 Appalachian State Mountaineers football team was an American football team that represented Appalachian State University as a member of the Southern Conference (SoCon) during the 1992 NCAA Division I-AA football season. In their fourth year under head coach Jerry Moore, the Mountaineers compiled an overall record of 7–5 with a conference mark of 5–2. Appalachian State advanced to the NCAA Division I-AA Football Championship playoffs, where they lost to Middle Tennessee in the first round.

== Schedule ==
Date	Opponent	Rank	Site	Result	Attendance	Source
September 5	at No. 18 (I-A) NC State*	No. 17	Carter–Finley Stadium; Raleigh, NC	L 10–35	41,095	
September 12	at Wake Forest*	No. 17	Groves Stadium; Winston-Salem, NC	L 7–10	24,387	
September 26	East Tennessee State		Kidd Brewer Stadium; Boone, NC	W 38–14	21,611	
October 3	No. 4 The Citadel		Kidd Brewer Stadium; Boone, NC	L 0–25	24,233	
October 10	at James Madison*		Bridgeforth Stadium; Harrisonburg, VA	W 27–21	14,000	
October 17	at VMI		Alumni Memorial Field; Lexington, VA	W 27–12	7,600	
October 24	Furman		Kidd Brewer Stadium; Boone, NC	L 13–16	16,971	
October 31	at Chattanooga		Chamberlain Field; Chattanooga, TN	W 37–13	2,931	
November 7	at No. 5 Marshall		Marshall University Stadium; Huntington, WV (rivalry)	W 37–34	21,497	
November 14	No. 17 North Carolina A&T*		Kidd Brewer Stadium; Boone, NC	W 42–6	12,687	
November 21	Western Carolina	No. 18	Kidd Brewer Stadium; Boone, NC (rivalry)	W 14–12	17,687	
November 28	at No. 4 Middle Tennessee*	No. 16	Johnny "Red" Floyd Stadium; Murfreesboro, TN (NCAA Division I-AA First Round)	L 10–35	4,000	
*Non-conference game; Rankings from NCAA Division I-AA Football Committee Poll released prior to the game
