= 1992 Tennessee–Martin Pacers football team =

American college football season

1992 Tennessee–Martin Pacers football
- Conference: Ohio Valley Conference
- Record: 3–8 (2–6 OVC)
- Head coach: Don McLeary (7th season)
- Home stadium: Pacer Stadium

1992 Ohio Valley Conference football standings
	Conf.					Overall
Team	W		L		T	W		L		T
No. 4 Middle Tennessee $^	8	–	0	–	0	10	–	3	–	0
No. 12 Eastern Kentucky ^	7	–	1	–	0	9	–	3	–	0
Tennessee Tech	6	–	2	–	0	7	–	4	–	0
Tennessee State	5	–	3	–	0	5	–	6	–	0
Morehead State	3	–	5	–	0	3	–	8	–	0
Austin Peay	2	–	6	–	0	3	–	8	–	0
Tennessee–Martin	2	–	6	–	0	3	–	8	–	0
Southeast Missouri State	2	–	6	–	0	2	–	9	–	0
Murray State	1	–	7	–	0	2	–	9	–	0
$ – Conference champion; ^ – NCAA Division I-AA playoff participant; Rankings from NCAA Division I-AA Football Committee poll

The 1992 Tennessee–Martin Pacers football team represented the University of Tennessee at Martin as a member of the Ohio Valley Conference (OVC) during the 1992 NCAA Division I-AA football season. Led by seventh-year head coach Don McLeary, the Pacers compiled an overall record of 3–8, with a mark of 2–6 in conference play, and finished tied for sixth in the OVC.

== Schedule ==
Date	Opponent	Site	Result	Attendance	Source
September 5	Delta State*	Pacer Stadium; Martin, TN	W 24–0		
September 12	at No. 20 Chattanooga*	Chamberlain Field; Chattanooga, TN	L 28–37	8,912	
September 26	Morehead State	Pacer Stadium; Martin, TN	W 20–7		
October 3	at Tennessee Tech	Tucker Stadium; Cookeville, TN	L 13–17	3,000	
October 10	Murray State	Pacer Stadium; Martin, TN	W 13–7		
October 17	at Tennessee State	Hale Stadium; Nashville, TN	L 15–23	4,986	
October 24	No. 17 Eastern Kentucky	Pacer Stadium; Martin, TN	L 9–35		
October 31	at Southeast Missouri State	Houck Stadium; Cape Girardeau, MO	L 13–37		
November 7	No. 7 Middle Tennessee	Pacer Stadium; Martin, TN	L 0–14		
November 14	No. 12 Samford*	Pacer Stadium; Martin, TN	L 24–42		
November 21	at Austin Peay	Municipal Stadium; Clarksville, TN	L 18–32	1,523	
*Non-conference game; Rankings from NCAA Division I-AA Football Committee Poll released prior to the game
