= 1992 Villanova Wildcats football team =

American college football season

1992 Villanova Wildcats football

Lambert Cup winner

NCAA Division I-AA First Round, L 20–23 vs. Youngstown State
- Conference: Yankee Conference
- Record: 9–3 (6–2 Yankee)
- Head coach: Andy Talley (8th season)
- Defensive coordinator: Dan MacNeill (5th season)
- Home stadium: Villanova Stadium

1992 Yankee Conference football standings
	Conf.					Overall
Team	W		L		T	W		L		T
No. 8 Delaware $^	7	–	1	–	0	11	–	3	–	0
No. 10 Villanova ^	6	–	2	–	0	9	–	3	–	0
UMass	5	–	3	–	0	7	–	3	–	0
Richmond	5	–	3	–	0	7	–	4	–	0
Maine	4	–	4	–	0	6	–	5	–	0
Connecticut	4	–	4	–	0	6	–	5	–	0
New Hampshire	3	–	5	–	0	5	–	5	–	1
Boston University	2	–	6	–	0	3	–	8	–	0
Rhode Island	0	–	8	–	0	1	–	10	–	0
$ – Conference champion; ^ – NCAA Division I-AA playoff participant; Rankings from NCAA Division I-AA Football Committee poll

The 1992 Villanova Wildcats football team was an American football team that represented the Villanova University as a member of the Yankee Conference during the 1992 NCAA Division I-AA football season. In their eighth year under head coach Andy Talley, the team compiled a 9–3 record.

== Schedule ==
Date	Opponent	Rank	Site	Result	Attendance	Source
September 4	West Chester*		Villanova Stadium; Villanova, PA	W 26–6	10,213	
September 12	Bucknell*	No. 6	Villanova Stadium; Villanova, PA	W 34–0	6,947	
September 19	Richmond	No. 3	Villanova Stadium; Villanova, PA	W 36–33	11,364	
October 3	at Boston University	No. T–2	Nickerson Field; Boston, MA	W 22–14	5,263	
October 10	at Connecticut	No. 2	Memorial Stadium; Storrs, CT	W 27–20	10,426	
October 17	No. 12 Delaware	No. 2	Villanova Stadium; Villanova, PA (rivalry)	L 20–21	12,000	
October 24	at UMass	No. 10	McGuirk Stadium; Hadley, MA	L 9–13	6,891	
October 31	Rhode Island	No. 14	Villanova Stadium; Villanova, PA	W 34–3	5,441	
November 7	at New Hampshire	No. 11	Cowell Stadium; Durham, NH	W 27–21		
November 14	Fordham*	No. 8	Villanova Stadium; Villanova, PA	W 31–14	9,567	
November 21	Maine	No. 8	Villanova Stadium; Villanova, PA	W 28–8		
November 28	at No. 7 Youngstown State*	No. 10	Stambaugh Stadium; Youngstown, OH (NCAA Division I-AA First Round)	L 20–23	9,465	
*Non-conference game; Rankings from NCAA Division I-AA Football Committee Poll released prior to the game
