= 1992 VMI Keydets football team =

American college football season

1992 VMI Keydets football
- Conference: Southern Conference
- Record: 3–8 (1–6 SoCon)
- Head coach: Jim Shuck (4th season)
- Home stadium: Alumni Memorial Field

1992 Southern Conference football standings
	Conf.					Overall
Team	W		L		T	W		L		T
No. 1 The Citadel $^	6	–	1	–	0	11	–	2	–	0
No. 6 Marshall ^	5	–	2	–	0	12	–	3	–	0
No. 16 Appalachian State ^	5	–	2	–	0	7	–	5	–	0
Western Carolina	5	–	2	–	0	7	–	4	–	0
Furman	4	–	3	–	0	6	–	5	–	0
East Tennessee State	2	–	5	–	0	5	–	6	–	0
VMI	1	–	6	–	0	3	–	8	–	0
Chattanooga	0	–	7	–	0	2	–	9	–	0
$ – Conference champion; ^ – NCAA Division I-AA playoff participant; Rankings from NCAA Division I-AA Football Committee poll

The 1992 VMI Keydets football team was an American football team that represented the Virginia Military Institute (VMI) as a member of the Southern Conference (SoCon) during the 1992 NCAA Division I-AA football season. In their fourth year under head coach Jim Shuck, the team compiled an overall record of 3–8, with a mark of 1–6 in conference play, placing seventh in the SoCon.

== Schedule ==
Date	Opponent	Site	Result	Attendance	Source
September 5	at East Tennessee State	Memorial Center; Johnson City, TN	L 16–18	5,206	
September 12	at William & Mary*	Zable Stadium; Williamsburg, VA (rivalry)	L 16–21	12,316	
September 19	No. 2 Marshall	Alumni Memorial Field; Lexington, VA	L 16–34	9,800	
September 26	West Virginia Tech*	Alumni Memorial Field; Lexington, VA	W 48–8	4,700	
October 3	at Furman	Paladin Stadium; Greenville, SC	L 13–41	13,225	
October 10	at Western Carolina	E. J. Whitmire Stadium; Cullowhee, NC	L 25–28	6,370	
October 17	Appalachian State	Alumni Memorial Field; Lexington, VA	L 12–27	7,600	
October 24	vs. Richmond*	Foreman Field; Norfolk, VA (Oyster Bowl, rivalry)	L 18–41	12,500	
November 7	Wofford*	Alumni Memorial Field; Lexington, VA	W 44–13	4,300	
November 14	at No. 2 The Citadel	Johnson Hagood Stadium; Charleston, SC (rivalry)	L 0–50	21,811	
November 21	Chattanooga	Alumni Memorial Field; Lexington, VA	W 37–34 ^{OT}	3,121	
*Non-conference game; Rankings from NCAA Division I-AA Football Committee Poll released prior to the game
