= 1992 Rhode Island Rams football team =

American college football season

1992 Rhode Island Rams football
- Conference: Yankee Conference
- New England Division
- Record: 1–10 (0–8 Yankee)
- Head coach: Bob Griffin (17th season)
- Home stadium: Meade Stadium

1992 Yankee Conference football standings
	Conf.					Overall
Team	W		L		T	W		L		T
No. 8 Delaware $^	7	–	1	–	0	11	–	3	–	0
No. 10 Villanova ^	6	–	2	–	0	9	–	3	–	0
UMass	5	–	3	–	0	7	–	3	–	0
Richmond	5	–	3	–	0	7	–	4	–	0
Maine	4	–	4	–	0	6	–	5	–	0
Connecticut	4	–	4	–	0	6	–	5	–	0
New Hampshire	3	–	5	–	0	5	–	5	–	1
Boston University	2	–	6	–	0	3	–	8	–	0
Rhode Island	0	–	8	–	0	1	–	10	–	0
$ – Conference champion; ^ – NCAA Division I-AA playoff participant; Rankings from NCAA Division I-AA Football Committee poll

The 1992 Rhode Island Rams football team was an American football team that represented the University of Rhode Island in the Yankee Conference during the 1992 NCAA Division I-AA football season. In their 17th and final season under head coach Bob Griffin, the Rams compiled a 1–10 record (0–8 against conference opponents) and finished last out of nine teams in the conference.

== Schedule ==
Date	Opponent	Site	Result	Attendance	Source
September 12	Towson State*	Meade Stadium; Kingston, RI	W 36–19	5,852	
September 19	at No. 8 Delaware	Delaware Stadium; Newark, DE	L 14–31	15,673	
September 26	Richmond	Meade Stadium; Kingston, RI	L 14–46	2,695	
October 2	at Hofstra*	Hofstra Stadium; Hempstead, NY	L 18–28	3,782	
October 10	UMass	Meade Stadium; Kingston, RI	L 7–32	6,141	
October 17	at Maine	Alumni Field; Orono, ME	L 9–21	8,842	
October 24	Boston University^{†}	Meade Stadium; Kingston, RI	L 21–34	7,097	
October 31	at No. 14 Villanova	Villanova Stadium; Villanova, PA	L 3–34	5,441	
November 7	at Northeastern*	Parsons Field; Brookline, MA	L 26–35	6,500	
November 14	New Hampshire	Meade Stadium; Kingston, RI	L 13–20	2,218	
November 21	at Connecticut	Memorial Stadium; Storrs, CT (rivalry)	L 0–38	3,472	
*Non-conference game; ^{†}Homecoming; Rankings from NCAA Division I-AA Football Committee Poll released prior to the game
