= 1992 Boston University Terriers football team =

American college football season

1992 Boston University Terriers football
- Conference: Yankee Conference
- Record: 3–8 (2–6 Yankee)
- Head coach: Dan Allen (3rd season)
- Offensive coordinator: Tony Sparano (4th season)
- Defensive coordinator: Chris Rippon (3rd season)
- Home stadium: Nickerson Field

1992 Yankee Conference football standings
	Conf.					Overall
Team	W		L		T	W		L		T
No. 8 Delaware $^	7	–	1	–	0	11	–	3	–	0
No. 10 Villanova ^	6	–	2	–	0	9	–	3	–	0
UMass	5	–	3	–	0	7	–	3	–	0
Richmond	5	–	3	–	0	7	–	4	–	0
Maine	4	–	4	–	0	6	–	5	–	0
Connecticut	4	–	4	–	0	6	–	5	–	0
New Hampshire	3	–	5	–	0	5	–	5	–	1
Boston University	2	–	6	–	0	3	–	8	–	0
Rhode Island	0	–	8	–	0	1	–	10	–	0
$ – Conference champion; ^ – NCAA Division I-AA playoff participant; Rankings from NCAA Division I-AA Football Committee poll

The 1992 Boston University Terriers football team was an American football team that represented Boston University as a member of the Yankee Conference during the 1992 NCAA Division I-AA football season. In their third season under head coach Dan Allen, the Terriers compiled a 3–8 record (2–6 against conference opponents), finished eighth out of nine teams in the Yankee Conference, and were outscored by a total of 352 to 218.

== Schedule ==
Date	Opponent	Site	Result	Attendance	Source
September 5	vs. Temple*	Hersheypark Stadium; Hershey, PA	L 0–35	8,612	
September 19	at No. 18 William & Mary*	Zable Stadium; Williamsburg, VA	L 21–31	9,205	
September 26	at UMass	McGuirk Stadium; Hadley, MA	L 28–30	5,846	
October 3	No. T–2 Villanova	Nickerson Field; Boston, MA	L 14–22	5,263	
October 10	at No. 12 Delaware	Delaware Stadium; Newark, DE	L 14–49	20,614	
October 17	No. 14 Richmond	Nickerson Field; Boston, MA	L 27–37	7,075	
October 24	at Rhode Island	Meade Stadium; Kingston, RI	W 34–21	7,097	
October 31	New Hampshire	Nickerson Field; Boston, MA	L 14–43		
November 7	vs. Maine	Fitzpatrick Stadium; Portland, ME	L 11–40		
November 14	Connecticut	Nickerson Field; Boston, MA	W 30–25	2,361	
November 21	Northeastern*	Nickerson Field; Boston, MA	W 25–19		
*Non-conference game; Rankings from NCAA Division I-AA Football Committee Poll released prior to the game
