= 1992 Austin Peay Governors football team =

American college football season

1992 Austin Peay Governors football
- Conference: Ohio Valley Conference
- Record: 3–8 (2–6 OVC)
- Head coach: Roy Gregory (2nd season)
- Home stadium: Municipal Stadium

1992 Ohio Valley Conference football standings
	Conf.					Overall
Team	W		L		T	W		L		T
No. 4 Middle Tennessee $^	8	–	0	–	0	10	–	3	–	0
No. 12 Eastern Kentucky ^	7	–	1	–	0	9	–	3	–	0
Tennessee Tech	6	–	2	–	0	7	–	4	–	0
Tennessee State	5	–	3	–	0	5	–	6	–	0
Morehead State	3	–	5	–	0	3	–	8	–	0
Austin Peay	2	–	6	–	0	3	–	8	–	0
Tennessee–Martin	2	–	6	–	0	3	–	8	–	0
Southeast Missouri State	2	–	6	–	0	2	–	9	–	0
Murray State	1	–	7	–	0	2	–	9	–	0
$ – Conference champion; ^ – NCAA Division I-AA playoff participant; Rankings from NCAA Division I-AA Football Committee poll

The 1992 Austin Peay Governors football team represented Austin Peay State University as a member of the Ohio Valley Conference (OVC) during the 1992 NCAA Division I-AA football season. Led by second-year head coach Roy Gregory, the Governors compiled an overall record of 3–8, with a mark of 2–6 in conference play, and finished tied for sixth in the OVC.

== Schedule ==
Date	Opponent	Site	Result	Attendance	Source
September 5	Eastern Illinois*	Municipal Stadium; Clarksville, TN	L 9–14		
September 12	Knoxville*	Municipal Stadium; Clarksville, TN	W 31–7		
September 19	at Southern Illinois*	McAndrew Stadium; Carbondale, IL	L 7–37	12,100	
September 26	at Southeast Missouri State	Houck Stadium; Cape Girardeau, MO	W 21–16		
October 3	at Murray State	Roy Stewart Stadium; Murray, KY	L 10–27	7,383	
October 10	at No. 8 Middle Tennessee	Johnny "Red" Floyd Stadium; Murfreesboro, TN	L 10–49		
October 17	Tennessee Tech	Municipal Stadium; Clarksville, TN	L 0–10	6,000	
October 24	at Tennessee State	Hale Stadium; Nashville, TN	L 14–35	18,341	
October 31	Morehead State	Municipal Stadium; Clarksville, TN	L 34–41	1,056	
November 14	No. 15 Eastern Kentucky	Municipal Stadium; Clarksville, TN	L 14–45		
November 21	Tennessee–Martin	Municipal Stadium; Clarksville, TN	W 32–18	1,523	
*Non-conference game; Rankings from NCAA Division I-AA Football Committee Poll released prior to the game
