= 1992 Richmond Spiders football team =

American college football season

1992 Richmond Spiders football
- Conference: Yankee Conference
- Record: 7–4 (5–3 Yankee)
- Head coach: Jim Marshall (4th season)
- Captains: Sterling Brown; Eric Johnson
- Home stadium: UR Stadium

1992 Yankee Conference football standings
	Conf.					Overall
Team	W		L		T	W		L		T
No. 8 Delaware $^	7	–	1	–	0	11	–	3	–	0
No. 10 Villanova ^	6	–	2	–	0	9	–	3	–	0
UMass	5	–	3	–	0	7	–	3	–	0
Richmond	5	–	3	–	0	7	–	4	–	0
Maine	4	–	4	–	0	6	–	5	–	0
Connecticut	4	–	4	–	0	6	–	5	–	0
New Hampshire	3	–	5	–	0	5	–	5	–	1
Boston University	2	–	6	–	0	3	–	8	–	0
Rhode Island	0	–	8	–	0	1	–	10	–	0
$ – Conference champion; ^ – NCAA Division I-AA playoff participant; Rankings from NCAA Division I-AA Football Committee poll

The 1992 Richmond Spiders football team was an American football team that represented the University of Richmond as a member of the Yankee Conference during the 1992 NCAA Division I-AA football season. In their fourth season under head coach Jim Marshall, Richmond compiled a 7–4 record, with a mark of 5–3 in conference play, finishing tied for third place in the Yankee.

== Schedule ==
Date	Opponent	Rank	Site	Result	Attendance	Source
September 12	James Madison*		UR Stadium; Richmond, VA (rivalry)	W 49–40	14,666	
September 19	at No. 3 Villanova		Villanova Stadium; Villanova, PA	L 33–36	11,364	
September 26	at Rhode Island		Meade Stadium; Kingston, RI	W 46–14	2,695	
October 3	Maine	No. 14	UR Stadium; Richmond, VA	W 28–6	14,708	
October 10	New Hampshire	No. 14	UR Stadium; Richmond, VA	W 15–7	11,011	
October 17	at Boston University	No. 14	Nickerson Field; Boston, MA	W 37–27	7,075	
October 24	vs. VMI*	No. 11	Foreman Field; Norfolk, VA (Oyster Bowl, rivalry)	W 41–18	12,500	
October 31	at Connecticut	No. 9	Memorial Stadium; Storrs, CT	L 28–30	5,214	
November 7	No. 20 UMass	No. 13	UR Stadium; Richmond, VA	L 13–17	10,402	
November 14	No. 3 Delaware		UR Stadium; Richmond, VA	W 29–21	15,822	
November 21	No. 13 William & Mary	No. 19	UR Stadium; Richmond, VA (rivalry)	L 19–34	19,377	
*Non-conference game; Rankings from NCAA Division I-AA Football Committee Poll released prior to the game
