= 1992 Southeast Missouri State Indians football team =

American college football season

1992 Southeast Missouri State Indians football
- Conference: Ohio Valley Conference
- Record: 2–9 (2–6 OVC)
- Head coach: John Mumford (3rd season)
- Home stadium: Houck Stadium

1992 Ohio Valley Conference football standings
	Conf.					Overall
Team	W		L		T	W		L		T
No. 4 Middle Tennessee $^	8	–	0	–	0	10	–	3	–	0
No. 12 Eastern Kentucky ^	7	–	1	–	0	9	–	3	–	0
Tennessee Tech	6	–	2	–	0	7	–	4	–	0
Tennessee State	5	–	3	–	0	5	–	6	–	0
Morehead State	3	–	5	–	0	3	–	8	–	0
Austin Peay	2	–	6	–	0	3	–	8	–	0
Tennessee–Martin	2	–	6	–	0	3	–	8	–	0
Southeast Missouri State	2	–	6	–	0	2	–	9	–	0
Murray State	1	–	7	–	0	2	–	9	–	0
$ – Conference champion; ^ – NCAA Division I-AA playoff participant; Rankings from NCAA Division I-AA Football Committee poll

The 1992 Southeast Missouri State Indians football team represented Southeast Missouri State University as a member of the Ohio Valley Conference (OVC) during the 1992 NCAA Division I-AA football season. Led by third-year head coach John Mumford, the Indians compiled an overall record of 2–9, with a mark of 2–6 in conference play, and finished tied for sixth in the OVC.

== Schedule ==
Date	Opponent	Site	Result	Attendance	Source
September 3	Murray State	Houck Stadium; Cape Girardeau, MO	W 27–21	7,422	
September 12	at Southern Illinois*	McAndrew Stadium; Carbondale, IL	L 35–44	10,200	
September 26	Austin Peay	Houck Stadium; Cape Girardeau, MO	L 16–21		
October 3	at No. 4 Eastern Kentucky	Roy Kidd Stadium; Richmond, KY	L 10–20		
October 10	at Tennessee Tech	Tucker Stadium; Cookeville, TN	L 14–49		
October 17	at No. 13 Samford*	Seibert Stadium; Homewood, AL	L 14–45		
October 24	No. 4 Middle Tennessee	Houck Stadium; Cape Girardeau, MO	L 16–30		
October 31	Tennessee–Martin	Houck Stadium; Cape Girardeau, MO	W 37–13		
November 7	at Morehead State	Jayne Stadium; Morehead, KY	L 17–20		
November 14	Illinois State*	Houck Stadium; Cape Girardeau, MO	L 33–52		
November 21	at Tennessee State	Hale Stadium; Nashville, TN	L 27–37	3,021	
*Non-conference game; Rankings from NCAA Division I-AA Football Committee Poll released prior to the game
