= 1992 Maine Black Bears football team =

American college football season

1992 Maine Black Bears football
- Conference: Yankee Conference
- Record: 6–5 (4–4 Yankee)
- Head coach: Kirk Ferentz (3rd season)
- Offensive coordinator: Jack Cosgrove (4th season)
- Defensive coordinator: Chuck Bresnahan (1st season)
- Captain: Game captains
- Home stadium: Alumni Field

1992 Yankee Conference football standings
	Conf.					Overall
Team	W		L		T	W		L		T
No. 8 Delaware $^	7	–	1	–	0	11	–	3	–	0
No. 10 Villanova ^	6	–	2	–	0	9	–	3	–	0
UMass	5	–	3	–	0	7	–	3	–	0
Richmond	5	–	3	–	0	7	–	4	–	0
Maine	4	–	4	–	0	6	–	5	–	0
Connecticut	4	–	4	–	0	6	–	5	–	0
New Hampshire	3	–	5	–	0	5	–	5	–	1
Boston University	2	–	6	–	0	3	–	8	–	0
Rhode Island	0	–	8	–	0	1	–	10	–	0
$ – Conference champion; ^ – NCAA Division I-AA playoff participant; Rankings from NCAA Division I-AA Football Committee poll

The 1992 Maine Black Bears football team was an American football team that represented the University of Maine as a member of the Yankee Conference during the 1992 NCAA Division I-AA football season. In their third and final season under head coach Kirk Ferentz, the Black Bears compiled a 6–5 record (4–4 against conference opponents) and tied for fifth place in the Yankee Conference.

== Schedule ==
Date	Opponent	Site	Result	Attendance	Source
September 5	New Hampshire	Alumni Field; Orono, ME (rivalry)	W 27–24	8,167	
September 12	Kutztown	Alumni Field; Orono, ME	W 10–0		
September 19	Northeastern*	Alumni Field; Orono, ME	L 36–47		
October 3	at No. 14 Richmond	University of Richmond Stadium; Richmond, VA	L 6–28	14,708	
October 10	Liberty	Alumni Field; Orono, ME	W 42–20		
October 17	Rhode Island	Alumni Field; Orono, ME	W 21–9	8,842	
October 24	at Connecticut	Memorial Stadium; Storrs, CT	L 30–37		
October 31	No. 7 Delaware	Alumni Field; Orono, ME	L 13–57	5,327	
November 7	vs. Boston University	Fitzpatrick Stadium; Portland, ME	W 40–11		
November 14	at No. 16 UMass	McGuirk Stadium; Hadley, MA	W 21–13	6,001	
November 21	at No. 8 Villanova	Villanova Stadium; Villanova, PA	L 8–28		
*Non-conference game; Rankings from NCAA Division I-AA Football Committee Poll released prior to the game

== Roster ==
1992 Maine Black Bears football team roster
Players			Coaches
Offense: Pos. / # / Name / Class; OT / 76 / Dan Jones / Sr	Defense: Pos. / # / Name / Class; LB / 31 / Jeff Comissiong / So	Special teams: Pos. / # / Name / Class	Head coach: Kirk Ferentz; Coordinators/assistant coaches Legend: (C) Team captain; (S) Suspended; (I) Ineligible; Injured; Redshirt
