= 1992 Morehead State Eagles football team =

American college football season

1992 Morehead State Eagles football
- Conference: Ohio Valley Conference
- Record: 3–8 (3–5 OVC)
- Head coach: Cole Proctor (3rd season)
- Home stadium: Jayne Stadium

1992 Ohio Valley Conference football standings
	Conf.					Overall
Team	W		L		T	W		L		T
No. 4 Middle Tennessee $^	8	–	0	–	0	10	–	3	–	0
No. 12 Eastern Kentucky ^	7	–	1	–	0	9	–	3	–	0
Tennessee Tech	6	–	2	–	0	7	–	4	–	0
Tennessee State	5	–	3	–	0	5	–	6	–	0
Morehead State	3	–	5	–	0	3	–	8	–	0
Austin Peay	2	–	6	–	0	3	–	8	–	0
Tennessee–Martin	2	–	6	–	0	3	–	8	–	0
Southeast Missouri State	2	–	6	–	0	2	–	9	–	0
Murray State	1	–	7	–	0	2	–	9	–	0
$ – Conference champion; ^ – NCAA Division I-AA playoff participant; Rankings from NCAA Division I-AA Football Committee poll

The 1992 Morehead State Eagles football team represented Morehead State University as a member of the Ohio Valley Conference (OVC) during the 1992 NCAA Division I-AA football season. Led by third-year head coach Cole Proctor, the Eagles compiled an overall record of 3–8, with a mark of 3–5 in conference play, and finished fifth in the OVC.

== Schedule ==
Date	Opponent	Site	Result	Attendance	Source
September 5	at No. 2 Marshall*	Marshall University Stadium; Huntington, WV	L 7–49	27,062	
September 12	West Virginia State*	Jayne Stadium; Morehead, KY	L 0–22	6,500	
September 26	at Tennessee–Martin	Pacer Stadium; Martin, TN	L 7–20		
October 3	at East Tennessee State*	Memorial Center; Johnson City, TN	L 7–27		
October 10	Tennessee State	Jayne Stadium; Morehead, KY	L 14–24	5,600	
October 17	Murray State	Jayne Stadium; Morehead, KY	W 31–7		
October 24	at Tennessee Tech	Tucker Stadium; Cookeville, TN	L 12–31		
October 31	at Austin Peay	Municipal Stadium; Clarksville, TN	W 41–34	1,056	
November 7	Southeast Missouri State	Jayne Stadium; Morehead, KY	W 20–17		
November 14	at No. 5 Middle Tennessee	Johnny "Red" Floyd Stadium; Murfreesboro, TN	L 0–70	6,000	
November 21	No. 12 Eastern Kentucky	Jayne Stadium; Morehead, KY (rivalry)	L 9–37	6,500	
*Non-conference game; Rankings from NCAA Division I-AA Football Committee Poll released prior to the game
