= 1992 Eastern Kentucky Colonels football team =

American college football season

1992 Eastern Kentucky Colonels football

NCAA Division I-AA First Round, L 10–44 at Marshall
- Conference: Ohio Valley Conference
- Record: 9–3 (7–1 OVC)
- Head coach: Roy Kidd (29th season)
- Home stadium: Roy Kidd Stadium

1992 Ohio Valley Conference football standings
	Conf.					Overall
Team	W		L		T	W		L		T
No. 4 Middle Tennessee $^	8	–	0	–	0	10	–	3	–	0
No. 12 Eastern Kentucky ^	7	–	1	–	0	9	–	3	–	0
Tennessee Tech	6	–	2	–	0	7	–	4	–	0
Tennessee State	5	–	3	–	0	5	–	6	–	0
Morehead State	3	–	5	–	0	3	–	8	–	0
Austin Peay	2	–	6	–	0	3	–	8	–	0
Tennessee–Martin	2	–	6	–	0	3	–	8	–	0
Southeast Missouri State	2	–	6	–	0	2	–	9	–	0
Murray State	1	–	7	–	0	2	–	9	–	0
$ – Conference champion; ^ – NCAA Division I-AA playoff participant; Rankings from NCAA Division I-AA Football Committee poll

The 1992 Eastern Kentucky Colonels football team represented Eastern Kentucky University as a member of the Ohio Valley Conference (OVC) during the 1992 NCAA Division I-AA football season. Led by 29th-year head coach Roy Kidd, the Colonels compiled an overall record of 9–3, with a mark of 7–1 in conference play, and finished second in the OVC. Eastern Kentucky advanced to the NCAA Division I-AA First Round and were defeated by Marshall.

== Schedule ==
Date	Opponent	Rank	Site	Result	Attendance	Source
September 5	at Western Kentucky*		L. T. Smith Stadium; Bowling Green, KY (rivalry)	W 21–7	14,101	
September 19	No. 10 Northeast Louisiana	No. 5	Roy Kidd Stadium; Richmond, KY	W 26–21		
September 26	Tennessee Tech	No. 5	Roy Kidd Stadium; Richmond, KY	W 35–0		
October 3	Southeast Missouri State	No. 4	Roy Kidd Stadium; Richmond, KY	W 20–10		
October 10	at No. 17 Samford*	No. 3	Seibert Stadium; Homewood, AL	L 14–46		
October 17	at No. 4 Middle Tennessee	No. 11	Johnny "Red" Floyd Stadium; Murfreesboro, TN	L 7–38	12,800	
October 24	at Tennessee–Martin	No. 17	Pacer Stadium; Martin, TN	W 35–9		
October 31	Tennessee State	No. 16	Roy Kidd Stadium; Richmond, KY	W 49–28	10,200	
November 7	Murray State	No. 15	Roy Kidd Stadium; Richmond, KY	W 21–18 ^{OT}	6,400	
November 14	at Austin Peay	No. 15	Municipal Stadium; Clarksville, TN	W 45–14		
November 21	at Morehead State	No. 12	Jayne Stadium; Morehead, KY (rivalry)	W 37–9	6,500	
November 28	at No. 6 Marshall*	No. 12	Marshall University Stadium; Huntington, WV (NCAA Division I-AA First Round)	L 10–44	16,598	
*Non-conference game; Rankings from NCAA Division I-AA Football Committee Poll released prior to the game
