= 1992 Tennessee Tech Golden Eagles football team =

American college football season

1992 Tennessee Tech Golden Eagles football
- Conference: Ohio Valley Conference
- Record: 7–4 (6–2 OVC)
- Head coach: Jim Ragland (7th season)
- Home stadium: Tucker Stadium

1992 Ohio Valley Conference football standings
	Conf.					Overall
Team	W		L		T	W		L		T
No. 4 Middle Tennessee $^	8	–	0	–	0	10	–	3	–	0
No. 12 Eastern Kentucky ^	7	–	1	–	0	9	–	3	–	0
Tennessee Tech	6	–	2	–	0	7	–	4	–	0
Tennessee State	5	–	3	–	0	5	–	6	–	0
Morehead State	3	–	5	–	0	3	–	8	–	0
Austin Peay	2	–	6	–	0	3	–	8	–	0
Tennessee–Martin	2	–	6	–	0	3	–	8	–	0
Southeast Missouri State	2	–	6	–	0	2	–	9	–	0
Murray State	1	–	7	–	0	2	–	9	–	0
$ – Conference champion; ^ – NCAA Division I-AA playoff participant; Rankings from NCAA Division I-AA Football Committee poll

The 1992 Tennessee Tech Golden Eagles football team represented Tennessee Technological University (commonly referred to as Tennessee Tech) as a member of the Ohio Valley Conference (OVC) during the 1992 NCAA Division I-AA football season. Led by seventh-year head coach Jim Ragland, the Golden Eagles compiled an overall record of 7–4, with a mark of 6–2 in conference play, and finished third in the OVC.

== Schedule ==
Date	Opponent	Site	Result	Attendance	Source
September 12	Lock Haven*	Tucker Stadium; Cookeville, TN	W 31–21		
September 19	Samford*	Tucker Stadium; Cookeville, TN	L 13–37		
September 26	at No. 5 Eastern Kentucky	Roy Kidd Stadium; Richmond, KY	L 0–35		
October 3	Tennessee–Martin	Tucker Stadium; Cookeville, TN	W 17–13	3,000	
October 10	Southeast Missouri State	Tucker Stadium; Cookeville, TN	W 49–14		
October 17	at Austin Peay	Municipal Stadium; Clarksville, TN	W 10–0	6,000	
October 24	Morehead State	Tucker Stadium; Cookeville, TN	W 31–12		
October 31	at Murray State	Roy Stewart Stadium; Murray, KY	W 35–10		
November 7	Tennessee State	Tucker Stadium; Cookeville, TN	W 26–15		
November 14	at No. 10 Marshall*	Marshall University Stadium; Huntington, WV	L 14–52	15,388	
November 21	at No. 4 Middle Tennessee	Johnny "Red" Floyd Stadium; Murfreesboro, TN	L 0–21		
*Non-conference game; Rankings from NCAA Division I-AA Football Committee Poll released prior to the game
