= 1992 New Hampshire Wildcats football team =

American college football season

1992 New Hampshire Wildcats football
- Conference: Yankee Conference
- Record: 5–5–1 (3–5 Yankee)
- Head coach: Bill Bowes (21st season)
- Home stadium: Cowell Stadium

1992 Yankee Conference football standings
| | Conf. | | | | | Overall |
| Team | W | | L | | T | W | | L | | T |
|---|---|---|---|---|---|---|---|---|---|---|
| No. 8 Delaware $^ | 7 | – | 1 | – | 0 | 11 | – | 3 | – | 0 |
| No. 10 Villanova ^ | 6 | – | 2 | – | 0 | 9 | – | 3 | – | 0 |
| UMass | 5 | – | 3 | – | 0 | 7 | – | 3 | – | 0 |
| Richmond | 5 | – | 3 | – | 0 | 7 | – | 4 | – | 0 |
| Maine | 4 | – | 4 | – | 0 | 6 | – | 5 | – | 0 |
| Connecticut | 4 | – | 4 | – | 0 | 6 | – | 5 | – | 0 |
| New Hampshire | 3 | – | 5 | – | 0 | 5 | – | 5 | – | 1 |
| Boston University | 2 | – | 6 | – | 0 | 3 | – | 8 | – | 0 |
| Rhode Island | 0 | – | 8 | – | 0 | 1 | – | 10 | – | 0 |
$ – Conference champion; ^ – NCAA Division I-AA playoff participant; Rankings from NCAA Division I-AA Football Committee poll

The 1992 New Hampshire Wildcats football team was an American football team that represented the University of New Hampshire as a member of the Yankee Conference during the 1992 NCAA Division I-AA football season. In its 21st year under head coach Bill Bowes, the team compiled a 5–5–1 record (3–5 against conference opponents) and finished seventh of nine teams in the Yankee Conference.

== Schedule ==
| Date | Opponent | Site | Result | Attendance | Source |
|---|---|---|---|---|---|
| September 5 | at Maine | Alumni Field; Orono, ME (rivalry) | L 24–27 | 8,167 | |
| September 12 | Connecticut | Cowell Stadium; Durham, NH | L 21–24 | | |
| September 19 | at Lehigh* | Goodman Stadium; Bethlehem, PA | W 28–14 | 7,183 | |
| September 26 | Dartmouth* | Cowell Stadium; Durham, NH (rivalry) | W 45–27 | 6,838 | |
| October 3 | No. 12 Delaware | Cowell Stadium; Durham, NH | L 22–42 | 8,709 | |
| October 10 | at No. 14 Richmond | University of Richmond Stadium; Richmond, VA | L 7–15 | 11,011 | |
| October 24 | Northeastern* | Cowell Stadium; Durham, NH | T 10–10 | | |
| October 31 | at Boston University | Nickerson Field; Boston, MA | W 43–14 | | |
| November 7 | No. 11 Villanova | Cowell Stadium; Durham, NH | L 21–27 | | |
| November 14 | at Rhode Island | Meade Stadium; Kingston, RI | W 20–13 | 2,218 | |
| November 21 | No. T–20 UMass | McGuirk Stadium; Hadley, MA (rivalry) | W 20–13 | 5,398 | |
*Non-conference game; Rankings from NCAA Division I-AA Football Committee Poll released prior to the game
