= 1992 Middle Tennessee Blue Raiders football team =

American college football season

1992 Middle Tennessee Blue Raiders football

OVC champion

NCAA Division I-AA Quarterfinal, L 21–35 at Marshall
- Conference: Ohio Valley Conference
- Record: 10–3 (8–0 OVC)
- Head coach: Boots Donnelly (14th season)
- Home stadium: Johnny "Red" Floyd Stadium

1992 Ohio Valley Conference football standings
	Conf.					Overall
Team	W		L		T	W		L		T
No. 4 Middle Tennessee $^	8	–	0	–	0	10	–	3	–	0
No. 12 Eastern Kentucky ^	7	–	1	–	0	9	–	3	–	0
Tennessee Tech	6	–	2	–	0	7	–	4	–	0
Tennessee State	5	–	3	–	0	5	–	6	–	0
Morehead State	3	–	5	–	0	3	–	8	–	0
Austin Peay	2	–	6	–	0	3	–	8	–	0
Tennessee–Martin	2	–	6	–	0	3	–	8	–	0
Southeast Missouri State	2	–	6	–	0	2	–	9	–	0
Murray State	1	–	7	–	0	2	–	9	–	0
$ – Conference champion; ^ – NCAA Division I-AA playoff participant; Rankings from NCAA Division I-AA Football Committee poll

The 1992 Middle Tennessee Blue Raiders football team represented Middle Tennessee State University in the 1992 NCAA Division I-AA football season

== Schedule ==
Date	Opponent	Rank	Site	Result	Attendance	Source
September 5	at Tennessee State		Vanderbilt Stadium; Nashville, TN	W 35–31	23,748	
September 12	at No. 11 (I-A) Nebraska*	No. 5	Memorial Stadium; Lincoln, NE	L 7–48	76,184	
September 26	at Murray State	No. 10	Roy Stewart Stadium; Murray, KY	W 66–6		
October 3	at Northern Illinois*	No. 8	Huskie Stadium; DeKalb, IL	W 21–13	12,632	
October 10	Austin Peay	No. 8	Johnny "Red" Floyd Stadium; Murfreesboro, TN	W 49–10		
October 17	No. 11 Eastern Kentucky	No. 4	Johnny "Red" Floyd Stadium; Murfreesboro, TN	W 38–7	12,800	
October 24	at Southeast Missouri State	No. 4	Houck Stadium; Cape Girardeau, MO	W 30–16		
October 31	at Georgia Southern*	No. 4	Paulson Stadium; Statesboro, GA	L 10–13	14,077	
November 7	at Tennessee–Martin	No. 7	Pacer Stadium; Martin, TN	W 14–0		
November 14	Morehead State	No. 5	Johnny "Red" Floyd Stadium; Murfreesboro, TN	W 70–0	6,000	
November 21	Tennessee Tech	No. 4	Johnny "Red" Floyd Stadium; Murfreesboro, TN	W 21–0		
November 28	No. 16 Appalachian State*	No. 4	Johnny "Red" Floyd Stadium; Murfreesboro, TN (NCAA Division I-AA First Round)	W 35–10		
December 5	at No. 6 Marshall*	No. 4	Marshall University Stadium; Huntington, WV (NCAA Division I-AA Quarterfinal)	L 21–35	14,011	
*Non-conference game; Rankings from NCAA Division I-AA Football Committee Poll released prior to the game

== After the season ==
=== NFL draft ===
The following Blue Raiders were selected in the National Football League draft following the season.

Round	Pick	Player	Position	NFL club
3	83	Mike Caldwell	Linebacker	Cleveland Browns
5	134	Walter Dunson	Wide receiver	San Diego Chargers
