= 1992 Western Carolina Catamounts football team =

American college football season

1992 Western Carolina Catamounts football
- Conference: Southern Conference
- Record: 7–4 (5–2 SoCon)
- Head coach: Steve Hodgin (3rd season)
- Home stadium: E. J. Whitmire Stadium

1992 Southern Conference football standings
	Conf.					Overall
Team	W		L		T	W		L		T
No. 1 The Citadel $^	6	–	1	–	0	11	–	2	–	0
No. 6 Marshall ^	5	–	2	–	0	12	–	3	–	0
No. 16 Appalachian State ^	5	–	2	–	0	7	–	5	–	0
Western Carolina	5	–	2	–	0	7	–	4	–	0
Furman	4	–	3	–	0	6	–	5	–	0
East Tennessee State	2	–	5	–	0	5	–	6	–	0
VMI	1	–	6	–	0	3	–	8	–	0
Chattanooga	0	–	7	–	0	2	–	9	–	0
$ – Conference champion; ^ – NCAA Division I-AA playoff participant; Rankings from NCAA Division I-AA Football Committee poll

The 1992 Western Carolina Catamounts team was an American football team that represented Western Carolina University as a member of the Southern Conference (SoCon) during the 1992 NCAA Division I-AA football season. In their third year under head coach Steve Hodgin, the team compiled an overall record of 7–4, with a mark of 5–2 in conference play, and finished tied for second in the SoCon.

== Schedule ==
Date	Opponent	Site	Result	Attendance	Source
September 5	Mars Hill*	E. J. Whitmire Stadium; Cullowhee, NC	W 42–6	5,240	
September 12	at No. 24 (I-A) Georgia Tech*	Bobby Dodd Stadium; Atlanta, GA	L 19–37	41,911	
September 26	Ferrum*	E. J. Whitmire Stadium; Cullowhee, NC	W 42–0	9,377	
October 3	at No. 18 Samford*	Seibert Stadium; Homewood, AL	L 6–30		
October 10	VMI	E. J. Whitmire Stadium; Cullowhee, NC	W 28–25	6,370	
October 17	at Chattanooga	Chamberlain Field; Chattanooga, TN	W 44–13	4,017	
October 24	No. 6 The Citadel	E. J. Whitmire Stadium; Cullowhee, NC	L 31–36	12,818	
October 31	No. 2 Marshall	E. J. Whitmire Stadium; Cullowhee, NC	W 38–30	9,180	
November 7	at Furman	Paladin Stadium; Greenville, SC	W 29–27		
November 14	East Tennessee State	E. J. Whitmire Stadium; Cullowhee, NC	W 41–12	9,247	
November 21	at No. 18 Appalachian State	Kidd Brewer Stadium; Boone, NC (rivalry)	L 12–14	17,687	
*Non-conference game; Rankings from NCAA Division I-AA Football Committee Poll released prior to the game
