= 1992 East Tennessee State Buccaneers football team =

American college football season

1992 East Tennessee State Buccaneers football
- Conference: Southern Conference
- Record: 5–6 (2–5 SoCon)
- Head coach: Mike Cavan (1st season)
- Home stadium: Memorial Center

1992 Southern Conference football standings
	Conf.					Overall
Team	W		L		T	W		L		T
No. 1 The Citadel $^	6	–	1	–	0	11	–	2	–	0
No. 6 Marshall ^	5	–	2	–	0	12	–	3	–	0
No. 16 Appalachian State ^	5	–	2	–	0	7	–	5	–	0
Western Carolina	5	–	2	–	0	7	–	4	–	0
Furman	4	–	3	–	0	6	–	5	–	0
East Tennessee State	2	–	5	–	0	5	–	6	–	0
VMI	1	–	6	–	0	3	–	8	–	0
Chattanooga	0	–	7	–	0	2	–	9	–	0
$ – Conference champion; ^ – NCAA Division I-AA playoff participant; Rankings from NCAA Division I-AA Football Committee poll

The 1992 East Tennessee State Buccaneers football team was an American football team that represented East Tennessee State University as a member of the Southern Conference (SoCon) during the 1992 NCAA Division I-AA football season. Led by first-year head coach Mike Cavan, the Buccaneers compiled and overall record of 5–6, with a mark of 2–5 in conference play, and finished sixth in the SoCon.

== Schedule ==
Date	Opponent	Site	Result	Attendance	Source
September 5	VMI	Memorial Center; Johnson City, TN	W 18–16	5,206	
September 12	Mars Hill*	Memorial Center; Johnson City, TN	W 21–0		
September 19	at No. 7 The Citadel	Johnson Hagood Stadium; Charleston, SC	L 7–28	16,231	
September 26	at Appalachian State	Kidd Brewer Stadium; Boone, NC	L 14–38	21,611	
October 3	Morehead State*	Memorial Center; Johnson City, TN	W 27–7		
October 10	Charleston Southern*	Memorial Center; Johnson City, TN	W 62–0	6,511	
October 17	at Louisiana Tech*	Joe Aillet Stadium; Ruston, LA	L 7–65	17,000	
October 31	Furman	Memorial Center; Johnson City, TN	L 14–45		
November 7	at Chattanooga	Chamberlain Field; Chattanooga, TN	W 27–24	3,497	
November 14	at Western Carolina	E. J. Whitmire Stadium; Cullowhee, NC	L 12–41	9,247	
November 21	No. 6 Marshall	Memorial Center; Johnson City, TN	L 10–49	5,002	
*Non-conference game; Rankings from NCAA Division I-AA Football Committee Poll released prior to the game
