= 1992 UMass Minutemen football team =

American college football season

1992 UMass Minutemen football
- Conference: Yankee Conference
- Record: 7–3 (5–2 Yankee)
- Head coach: Mike Hodges (1st season)
- Home stadium: Warren McGuirk Alumni Stadium

1992 Yankee Conference football standings
	Conf.					Overall
Team	W		L		T	W		L		T
No. 8 Delaware $^	7	–	1	–	0	11	–	3	–	0
No. 10 Villanova ^	6	–	2	–	0	9	–	3	–	0
UMass	5	–	3	–	0	7	–	3	–	0
Richmond	5	–	3	–	0	7	–	4	–	0
Maine	4	–	4	–	0	6	–	5	–	0
Connecticut	4	–	4	–	0	6	–	5	–	0
New Hampshire	3	–	5	–	0	5	–	5	–	1
Boston University	2	–	6	–	0	3	–	8	–	0
Rhode Island	0	–	8	–	0	1	–	10	–	0
$ – Conference champion; ^ – NCAA Division I-AA playoff participant; Rankings from NCAA Division I-AA Football Committee poll

The 1992 UMass Minutemen football team represented the University of Massachusetts Amherst in the 1992 NCAA Division I-AA football season as a member of the Yankee Conference. The team was coached by Mike Hodges and played its home games at Warren McGuirk Alumni Stadium in Hadley, Massachusetts. The 1992 season was Hodges' first as head coach of the Minutemen. UMass finished the season with a record of 7–3 overall and 5–3 in conference play.

== Schedule ==
Date	Opponent	Rank	Site	Result	Attendance	Source
September 12	at No. 9 Delaware		Delaware Stadium; Newark, DE	L 13–33	17,299	
September 19	at No. 20 Holy Cross*		Fitton Field; Worcester, MA	W 7–3	10,802	
September 26	Boston University		McGuirk Stadium; Hadley, MA	W 30–28	5,846	
October 10	at Rhode Island		Meade Stadium; Kingston, RI	W 32–7	6,141	
October 17	Connecticut		McGuirk Stadium; Hadley, MA (rivalry)	W 20–7	10,909	
October 24	No. 10 Villanova		McGuirk Stadium; Hadley, MA	W 13–9	6,891	
October 31	Northeastern*	No. 18	McGuirk Stadium; Hadley, MA	W 22–10	5,051	
November 7	at No. 16 Richmond	No. 15	UR Stadium; Richmond, VA	W 17–13	10,402	
November 14	Maine	No. 15	McGuirk Stadium; Hadley, MA	L 13–21	6,001	
November 21	at New Hampshire	No. T–20	Cowell Stadium; Durham, NH (rivalry)	L 13–20	5,398	
*Non-conference game; Rankings from NCAA Division I-AA Football Committee Poll released prior to the game
