= 1992 Connecticut Huskies football team =

American college football season

1992 Connecticut Huskies football
- Conference: Yankee Conference
- Record: 5–6 (4–4 Yankee)
- Head coach: Tom Jackson (10th season)
- Home stadium: Memorial Stadium

1992 Yankee Conference football standings
	Conf.					Overall
Team	W		L		T	W		L		T
No. 8 Delaware $^	7	–	1	–	0	11	–	3	–	0
No. 10 Villanova ^	6	–	2	–	0	9	–	3	–	0
UMass	5	–	3	–	0	7	–	3	–	0
Richmond	5	–	3	–	0	7	–	4	–	0
Maine	4	–	4	–	0	6	–	5	–	0
Connecticut	4	–	4	–	0	6	–	5	–	0
New Hampshire	3	–	5	–	0	5	–	5	–	1
Boston University	2	–	6	–	0	3	–	8	–	0
Rhode Island	0	–	8	–	0	1	–	10	–	0
$ – Conference champion; ^ – NCAA Division I-AA playoff participant; Rankings from NCAA Division I-AA Football Committee poll

The 1992 Connecticut Huskies football team represented the University of Connecticut in the 1992 NCAA Division I-AA football season. The Huskies were led by tenth-year head coach Tom Jackson, and completed the season with a record of 5–6.

== Schedule ==
Date	Opponent	Site	Result	Attendance	Source
September 5	New Haven*	Memorial Stadium; Storrs, CT	L 13–14	7,142	
September 12	at New Hampshire	Cowell Stadium; Durham, NH	W 24–21		
September 26	at Northeastern*	Parsons Field; Brookline, MA	L 13–16		
October 3	at Yale*	Memorial Stadium; Storrs, CT	W 40–20	12,104	
October 10	No. 2 Villanova	Memorial Stadium; Storrs, CT	L 20–27	10,426	
October 17	at UMass	Warren McGuirk Alumni Stadium; Amherst, MA (rivalry)	L 7–20	10,909	
October 24	Maine	Memorial Stadium; Storrs, CT	W 37–30		
October 31	Richmond	Memorial Stadium; Storrs, CT	W 30–28	5,214	
November 7	at No. 6 Delaware	Delaware Stadium; Newark, DE	L 7–33	22,911	
November 14	at Boston University	Nickerson Field; Boston, MA	L 25–30	2,361	
November 21	Rhode Island	Memorial Stadium; Storrs, CT (rivalry)	W 38–0	3,472	
*Non-conference game; Rankings from NCAA Division I-AA Football Committee Poll released prior to the game
