= 1992 Chattanooga Moccasins football team =

American college football season

1992 Chattanooga Moccasins football
- Conference: Southern Conference
- Record: 2–9 (0–7 SoCon)
- Head coach: Buddy Nix (9th season)
- Captain: Game captains
- Home stadium: Chamberlain Field

1992 Southern Conference football standings
	Conf.					Overall
Team	W		L		T	W		L		T
No. 1 The Citadel $^	6	–	1	–	0	11	–	2	–	0
No. 6 Marshall ^	5	–	2	–	0	12	–	3	–	0
No. 16 Appalachian State ^	5	–	2	–	0	7	–	5	–	0
Western Carolina	5	–	2	–	0	7	–	4	–	0
Furman	4	–	3	–	0	6	–	5	–	0
East Tennessee State	2	–	5	–	0	5	–	6	–	0
VMI	1	–	6	–	0	3	–	8	–	0
Chattanooga	0	–	7	–	0	2	–	9	–	0
$ – Conference champion; ^ – NCAA Division I-AA playoff participant; Rankings from NCAA Division I-AA Football Committee poll

The 1992 Chattanooga Moccasins football team represented the University of Tennessee at Chattanooga as a member of the Southern Conference (SoCon) in the 1992 NCAA Division I-AA football season. The Moccasins were led by ninth-year head coach Buddy Nix and played their home games at Chamberlain Field. They finished the season 2–9 overall and 0–7 in SoCon play to place eighth.

== Schedule ==
Date	Opponent	Rank	Site	Result	Attendance	Source
September 5	at Boise State*		Bronco Stadium; Boise, ID	W 35–20	18,194	
September 12	Tennessee–Martin*	No. 20	Chamberlain Field; Chattanooga, TN	W 37–28	8,912	
September 26	Central Arkansas*	No. 9	Chamberlain Field; Chattanooga, TN	L 17–24	5,926	
October 3	at No. 25 (I-A) Clemson*	No. 19	Memorial Stadium; Clemson, SC	L 3–54	71,486	
October 10	at No. 4 The Citadel		Johnson Hagood Stadium; Charleston, SC	L 13–33	19,622	
October 17	Western Carolina		Chamberlain Field; Chattanooga, TN	L 13–44	4,017	
October 24	at No. 3 Marshall		Marshall University Stadium; Huntington, WV	L 23–52	21,135	
October 31	No. 15 Appalachian State^{†}		Chamberlain Field; Chattanooga, TN	L 17–37	2,931	
November 7	East Tennessee State		Chamberlain Field; Chattanooga, TN	L 24–27	3,497	
November 14	Furman		Chamberlain Field; Chattanooga, TN	L 7–35	4,114	
November 21	at VMI		Alumni Memorial Field; Lexington, VA	L 34–37 ^{OT}	3,121	
*Non-conference game; ^{†}Homecoming; Rankings from NCAA Division I-AA Football Committee Poll released prior to the game
