= 1992 Murray State Racers football team =

American college football season

1992 Murray State Racers football
- Conference: Ohio Valley Conference
- Record: 2–9 (1–7 OVC)
- Head coach: Mike Mahoney (6th season)
- Home stadium: Roy Stewart Stadium

1992 Ohio Valley Conference football standings
	Conf.					Overall
Team	W		L		T	W		L		T
No. 4 Middle Tennessee $^	8	–	0	–	0	10	–	3	–	0
No. 12 Eastern Kentucky ^	7	–	1	–	0	9	–	3	–	0
Tennessee Tech	6	–	2	–	0	7	–	4	–	0
Tennessee State	5	–	3	–	0	5	–	6	–	0
Morehead State	3	–	5	–	0	3	–	8	–	0
Austin Peay	2	–	6	–	0	3	–	8	–	0
Tennessee–Martin	2	–	6	–	0	3	–	8	–	0
Southeast Missouri State	2	–	6	–	0	2	–	9	–	0
Murray State	1	–	7	–	0	2	–	9	–	0
$ – Conference champion; ^ – NCAA Division I-AA playoff participant; Rankings from NCAA Division I-AA Football Committee poll

The 1992 Murray State Racers football team represented Murray State University during the 1992 NCAA Division I-AA football season as a member of the Ohio Valley Conference (OVC). Led by sixth-year head coach Mike Mahoney, the Racers compiled an overall record of 2–9, with a mark of 1–7 in conference play, and finished ninth in the OVC.

== Schedule ==
Date	Opponent	Site	Result	Attendance	Source
September 3	at Southeast Missouri State	Houck Stadium; Cape Girardeau, MO	L 21–27	7,422	
September 12	Missouri–Rolla*	Roy Stewart Stadium; Murray, KY	W 36–0	3,800	
September 19	at Eastern Illinois*	O'Brien Stadium; Charleston, IL	L 9–48		
September 26	No. 10 Middle Tennessee	Roy Stewart Stadium; Murray, KY	L 6–66		
October 3	Austin Peay	Roy Stewart Stadium; Murray, KY	W 27–10	7,383	
October 10	at Tennessee–Martin	Pacer Stadium; Martin, TN	L 7–13		
October 17	at Morehead State	Jayne Stadium; Morehead, KY	L 7–31		
October 31	Tennessee Tech	Roy Stewart Stadium; Murray, KY	L 10–35		
November 7	at No. 15 Eastern Kentucky	Roy Kidd Stadium; Richmond, KY	L 18–21 ^{OT}	6,400	
November 14	Tennessee State	Roy Stewart Stadium; Murray, KY	L 10–19		
November 21	Western Kentucky*	Roy Stewart Stadium; Murray, KY (rivalry)	L 15–47	1,403	
*Non-conference game; Rankings from NCAA Division I-AA Football Committee Poll released prior to the game
