= 1992 Furman Paladins football team =

American college football season

1992 Furman Paladins football
- Conference: Southern Conference
- Record: 6–5 (4–3 SoCon)
- Head coach: Jimmy Satterfield (7th season)
- Captains: Kota Suttle; Carl Tremble; Tate Waters
- Home stadium: Paladin Stadium

1992 Southern Conference football standings
	Conf.					Overall
Team	W		L		T	W		L		T
No. 1 The Citadel $^	6	–	1	–	0	11	–	2	–	0
No. 6 Marshall ^	5	–	2	–	0	12	–	3	–	0
No. 16 Appalachian State ^	5	–	2	–	0	7	–	5	–	0
Western Carolina	5	–	2	–	0	7	–	4	–	0
Furman	4	–	3	–	0	6	–	5	–	0
East Tennessee State	2	–	5	–	0	5	–	6	–	0
VMI	1	–	6	–	0	3	–	8	–	0
Chattanooga	0	–	7	–	0	2	–	9	–	0
$ – Conference champion; ^ – NCAA Division I-AA playoff participant; Rankings from NCAA Division I-AA Football Committee poll

The 1992 Furman Paladins football team was an American football team that represented Furman University as a member of the Southern Conference (SoCon) during the 1992 NCAA Division I-AA football season. In their seventh year under head coach Jimmy Satterfield, the Paladins compiled an overall record of 6–5 with a mark of 4–3 in conference play, finishing fifth in the SoCon.

== Schedule ==
Date	Opponent	Rank	Site	Result	Attendance	Source
September 5	Liberty*		Paladin Stadium; Greenville, SC	W 31–13	9,035	
September 12	at North Carolina*		Kenan Memorial Stadium; Chapel Hill, NC	L 0–28	48,500	
September 19	Presbyterian*	No. 19	Paladin Stadium; Greenville, SC	W 43–7		
September 26	Georgia Southern	No. 13	Paladin Stadium; Greenville, SC	L 0–21	14,879	
October 3	VMI		Paladin Stadium; Greenville, SC	W 41–13	13,225	
October 10	at No. 6 Marshall		Marshall University Stadium; Huntington, WV	L 6–48	28,272	
October 24	at Appalachian State		Kidd Brewer Stadium; Boone, NC	W 16–13	16,971	
October 31	at East Tennessee State		Memorial Center; Johnson City, TN	W 45–14		
November 7	Western Carolina		Paladin Stadium; Greenville, SC	L 27–29		
November 14	at Chattanooga		Chamberlain Field; Chattanooga, TN	W 35–7	4,114	
November 21	No. 1 The Citadel		Paladin Stadium; Greenville, SC (rivalry)	L 14–20	16,464	
*Non-conference game; Rankings from NCAA Division I-AA Football Committee Poll released prior to the game
