= 1992 Tennessee State Tigers football team =

American college football season

1992 Tennessee State Tigers football
- Conference: Ohio Valley Conference
- Record: 5–6 (5–3 OVC)
- Head coach: Joe Gilliam Sr. (4th season)
- Home stadium: Hale Stadium

1992 Ohio Valley Conference football standings
	Conf.					Overall
Team	W		L		T	W		L		T
No. 4 Middle Tennessee $^	8	–	0	–	0	10	–	3	–	0
No. 12 Eastern Kentucky ^	7	–	1	–	0	9	–	3	–	0
Tennessee Tech	6	–	2	–	0	7	–	4	–	0
Tennessee State	5	–	3	–	0	5	–	6	–	0
Morehead State	3	–	5	–	0	3	–	8	–	0
Austin Peay	2	–	6	–	0	3	–	8	–	0
Tennessee–Martin	2	–	6	–	0	3	–	8	–	0
Southeast Missouri State	2	–	6	–	0	2	–	9	–	0
Murray State	1	–	7	–	0	2	–	9	–	0
$ – Conference champion; ^ – NCAA Division I-AA playoff participant; Rankings from NCAA Division I-AA Football Committee poll

The 1992 Tennessee State Tigers football team represented Tennessee State University as a member of the Ohio Valley Conference (OVC) during the 1992 NCAA Division I-AA football season. Led by fourth-year head coach Joe Gilliam Sr., the Tigers compiled an overall record of 5–6, with a conference record of 5–3, and finished fourth in the OVC.

== Schedule ==
Date	Opponent	Site	Result	Attendance	Source
September 5	vs. No. 5 Middle Tennessee	Vanderbilt Stadium; Nashville, TN	L 31–35	23,748	
September 12	vs. Jackson State*	Liberty Bowl Memorial Stadium; Memphis, TN (Southern Heritage Classic)	L 18–38	37,437	
September 19	at Grambling State*	Eddie G. Robinson Memorial Stadium; Grambling, LA	L 28–38		
September 26	vs. Florida A&M*	Atlanta–Fulton County Stadium; Atlanta, GA (Atlanta Football Classic)	L 12–20	43,211	
October 10	at Morehead State	Jayne Stadium; Morehead, KY	W 24–14	5,600	
October 17	Tennessee–Martin	Hale Stadium; Nashville, TN	W 23–15	4,986	
October 24	Austin Peay^{†}	Hale Stadium; Nashville, TN	W 35–14	18,341	
October 31	at No. 16 Eastern Kentucky	Hanger Field; Richmond, KY	L 28–49	10,200	
November 7	at Tennessee Tech	Tucker Stadium; Cookeville, TN	L 15–26		
November 14	at Murray State	Roy Stewart Stadium; Murray, KY	W 19–10		
November 21	Southeast Missouri State	Hale Stadium; Nashville, TN	W 37–27	3,021	
*Non-conference game; ^{†}Homecoming; Rankings from NCAA Division I-AA Football Committee Poll released prior to the game
