= Michael Payton =

American football player (1970–2018)

No. 14
- Position: Quarterback

Personal information
- Born: March 5, 1970; Harrisburg, Pennsylvania, U.S.
- Died: September 27, 2018 (aged 48)
- Listed height: 6 ft 2 in (1.88 m)
- Listed weight: 225 lb (102 kg)

Career information
- High school: Central Dauphin East (Harrisburg)
- College: Marshall (1989–1992)
- NFL draft: 1993: undrafted

Career history
- Dallas Cowboys (1993)*; Saskatchewan Roughriders (1994–1995); Florida Bobcats (1996)
- * Offseason or practice squad member only

Awards and highlights
- Division I-AA national champion (1992); Walter Payton Award (1992); Consensus I-AA All-American (1992); 2× SoCon Male Athlete of the Year (1991, 1992); 2× SoCon Player of the Year (1991, 1992); 2× First-team All-SoCon (1991, 1992)

Career AFL statistics
- Passing attempts: 17
- Passing completions: 3
- Completion percentage: 17.6%
- TD–INT: 0–1
- Passing yards: 31
- Stats at ArenaFan.com
- College Football Hall of Fame

Michael Payton (March 5, 1970 – September 27, 2018) was an American football quarterback. He played college football for the Marshall Thundering Herd, where he won the 1992 Walter Payton Award. After college, he played one season in the Arena Football League (AFL) for the Florida Bobcats.

== College football ==
Born in Harrisburg, Pennsylvania, Payton attended Central Dauphin East High School and was spotted by Marshall University coach George Chaump. Payton originally intended to play for Chaump at Indiana University of Pennsylvania (IUP) and had an apartment rented there. However Chaump switched to Marshall University and asked Payton to join him there. Payton was set on IUP but his father told him to go and look at Marshall's campus and to reconsider as Marshall played in a higher college football league. Payton went to Marshall and because of the quality of the staff, the campus and the football programme decided to attend. He later said, "I loved the place and loved the people. They stand behind the athletes."

Chaump left in 1989 but Payton remained. As a sophomore in 1990, he completed 199 of 347 passes for 2,409 yards, 12 touchdowns, and 16 interceptions. In 1991, he completed 222 passes on 346 attempts for 3,392 yards, 26 touchdowns, and 10 interceptions. That season, he led Marshall to the NCAA Division I championship game, where the Herd finished as runners-up. Payton also set the Division I-AA record for season passing efficiency and was named Southern Conference Player of the Year. Payton was also West Virginia Athlete of the Year and Man of the Year for 1991.

In 1992, he completed 268 passes on 415 attempts for 3,610 yards, 31 touchdowns, and 12 interceptions. He was awarded the Walter Payton Award for that year and was a consensus first-team All-American. Payton again led Marshall to the I-AA title contest, where they defeated Youngstown State in the 1992 NCAA Division I-AA Football Championship Game, giving Marshall their first I-AA title. He was again named Southern Conference Player of the Year, West Virginia Athlete of the Year and Man of the Year. Payton finished his college tenure as the Southern Conference's all-time career passing leader, and received the Walter Payton Award, which is given annually to the best player in Division I-AA football. Payton is Marshall's fourth highest ever passer with 9.411 career yards-gained (exceeding the previous record by more than 2,300 yards) and their fifth highest all-time scorer with 69 career touchdowns. At Marshall, he played frequently with future New England Patriots receiver Troy Brown.

== Professional career ==
After graduating from college Payton had a brief stint with the Dallas Cowboys as a free agent but his time there was cut short by compartment syndrome, which caused numbness in one of his feet. Payton collapsed after a couple of months in Dallas and was in danger of losing his leg. He returned to practice within three weeks but was dropped by Dallas days later. Afterwards Payton played for the Saskatchewan Roughriders in the Canadian Football League.

Payton played for one season in the Arena Football League. He played as a back-up quarterback for the Florida Bobcats in 1996. That year, he completed three passes on 17 attempts and threw one interception.

Payton was inducted in the Marshall University Athletic Hall of Fame in 1999. In January 2015, Payton was one of 17 players elected to the College Football Hall of Fame.

== Personal life ==
Payton was active with the charities Drug Abuse Resistance Education and Big Brothers Big Sisters of America. He was also a senior counsellor for Alternative Rehabilitation Communities, a personal trainer and life coach. Payton was also a voter in the FWAA-NFF Grantland Rice Super 16 Poll.

== Death ==
Payton died on September 27, 2018, from cancer. He had received twelve separate treatments for the disease.

== Michael Payton Memorial Quarterback Award ==
Payton was a member of the Board of Advisors of the Mr. Pennsylvania Football program. The Michael Payton Memorial Quarterback Award was established in his honor. Recipients have displayed academic, athletic, and moral leadership. The award is presented at the annual banquet by members of his family.
