= 1992 The Citadel Bulldogs football team =

American college football season

1992 The Citadel Bulldogs football
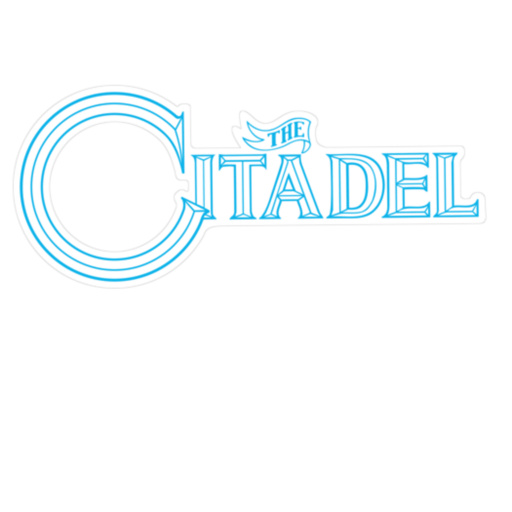

SoCon champion

NCAA Division I-AA Quarterfinal, L 17–42 vs. Youngstown State
- Conference: Southern Conference
- Record: 11–2 (6–1 SoCon)
- Head coach: Charlie Taaffe (6th season)
- Offensive scheme: Option
- Defensive coordinator: Don Powers (4th season)
- Home stadium: Johnson Hagood Stadium

1992 Southern Conference football standings
	Conf.					Overall
Team	W		L		T	W		L		T
No. 1 The Citadel $^	6	–	1	–	0	11	–	2	–	0
No. 6 Marshall ^	5	–	2	–	0	12	–	3	–	0
No. 16 Appalachian State ^	5	–	2	–	0	7	–	5	–	0
Western Carolina	5	–	2	–	0	7	–	4	–	0
Furman	4	–	3	–	0	6	–	5	–	0
East Tennessee State	2	–	5	–	0	5	–	6	–	0
VMI	1	–	6	–	0	3	–	8	–	0
Chattanooga	0	–	7	–	0	2	–	9	–	0
$ – Conference champion; ^ – NCAA Division I-AA playoff participant; Rankings from NCAA Division I-AA Football Committee poll

The 1992 The Citadel Bulldogs football team represented The Citadel, The Military College of South Carolina in the 1992 NCAA Division I-AA football season. The Bulldogs were led by sixth-year head coach Charlie Taaffe and played their home games at Johnson Hagood Stadium. They played as members of the Southern Conference, as they have since 1936.

The Citadel claimed its second SoCon championship, their first since 1961. They spent four weeks as the top ranked team in the nation and played in the I-AA playoffs for the third time in five years. They also won 11 games, most in school history, and the only time a Bulldog football team has won more than eight games in a season. Their playoff win was the first postseason victory for the Bulldogs since the 1960 Tangerine Bowl.

The Bulldogs defeated two teams from Division I-A for the first time since the SoCon became a Division I-AA league. Wins over Arkansas and Army marked high points in the season. The victory over Arkansas to open the season resulted in the Razorbacks' head coach Jack Crowe stepping down. This was Arkansas' first game as a member of the Southeastern Conference.

After the win over Arkansas, Sports Illustrated published a story critical of The Citadel and its military environment, particularly its effects on athletes. It contained several accounts of hazing, most notably of a freshman kicker who missed a field goal that would have won the 1991 game against Wofford. The story created a firestorm on campus and potential distractions for the team, as several current players were named in the article.

== Schedule ==
Date	Time	Opponent	Rank	Site	TV	Result	Attendance	Source
September 5	3:00 p.m.	at Arkansas*		Razorback Stadium; Fayetteville, AR		W 10–3	35,868	
September 12	7:00 p.m.	Wofford*	No. 12	Johnson Hagood Stadium; Charleston, SC (rivalry)		W 30–13	20,710	
September 19	7:00 p.m.	East Tennessee State	No. 9	Johnson Hagood Stadium; Charleston, SC		W 28–7	16,231	
September 26	1:30 p.m.	at Army*	No. 8	Michie Stadium; West Point, NY		W 15–14	37,692	
October 3	1:30 p.m.	at Appalachian State	No. 6	Kidd Brewer Stadium; Boone, NC		W 25–0	24,233	
October 10	7:00 p.m.	Chattanooga	No. 5	Johnson Hagood Stadium; Charleston, SC		W 33–13	19,622	
October 17	4:08 p.m.	No. 5 Marshall	No. 4	Johnson Hagood Stadium; Charleston, SC	WTAV-24	L 13–34	23,025	
October 24	2:00 p.m.	at Western Carolina	No. 6	E. J. Whitmire Stadium; Cullowhee, NC		W 36–31	12,818	
November 7	2:00 p.m.	Newberry*	No. 3	Johnson Hagood Stadium; Charleston, SC		W 32–14	14,757	
November 14	2:00 p.m.	VMI^{†}	No. 2	Johnson Hagood Stadium; Charleston, SC (Military Classic of the South)		W 50–0	21,811	
November 21	1:30 p.m.	at Furman	No. 1	Paladin Stadium; Greenville, SC (rivalry)		W 20–14	16,464	
November 28	1:00 p.m.	No. 17 North Carolina A&T*	No. 1	Johnson Hagood Stadium; Charleston, SC (NCAA Division I-AA First Round)		W 44–0	12,300	
December 5	1:00 p.m.	No. 7 Youngstown State*	No. 1	Johnson Hagood Stadium; Charleston, SC (NCAA Division I-AA Quarterfinal)		L 17–42	13,021	
*Non-conference game; ^{†}Homecoming; Rankings from NCAA Division I-AA Football Committee Poll released prior to the game; All times are in Eastern time

== Preseason ==
The Bulldogs were picked to finish fifth in the eight team SoCon by league media.

== Game summaries ==
=== Arkansas ===
Team	1	2	3	4	Total
• Bulldogs	0	0	0	10	10
Razorbacks	0	0	0	3	3

- Date: September 5, 1992
- Location: Razorback Stadium, Fayetteville, Arkansas
- Game start: 2:00 P.M. CDT
- Game attendance: 35,868

Scoring summary
4	14:08	ARK	Todd Wright 25-yard field goal	ARK 3–0
4	9:48	CIT	Judson Boehmer 34-yard fumble return (Jeff Trinh kick)	CIT 7–3
4	3:28	CIT	Jeff Trinh 25-yard field goal	CIT 10–3

The Citadel opened the 1992 season at Arkansas, which had joined the Southeastern Conference prior to the 1992 NCAA Division I-A football season. The Razorbacks returned 14 starters from a 1991 team that went to a bowl game and was considered "legitimate contenders for the SEC title." Arkansas had not lost a home opener on campus since 1906, going 42–0–3 since a loss to the Chilocco Indians, while The Citadel had lost 19 of 20 road openers, the lone win against Navy in 1989. The two teams had never met in football, and The Citadel's only wins over SEC teams were over Vanderbilt in 1962 and 1979.

Both teams were scoreless through three quarters, as each team missed a field goal as the second quarter wound down. Late in the third quarter, the Bulldogs drove to the Arkansas 25–yard line before QB Jack Douglas fumbled a pitch to Eric Little, which the Razorbacks recovered on their 24–yard line. They drove to The Citadel 8–yard line, where they faced fourth down and one yard to go. As fans booed, the Razorbacks sent out their field goal unit for a 25–yard kick by Todd Wright to take a 3–0 lead early in the 4th quarter. The Citadel was unable to move past midfield on their ensuing possession and were forced to punt. On a second and four play from the Razorbacks 31, RB E. D. Jackson took a handoff up the middle where he was met by Bulldogs DE Garrett Sizer, knocking the ball loose. Citadel DE Judson Boehmer recovered the fumble behind the line of scrimmage, and taking advantage of a rule change for 1992 returned it for a touchdown. The Razorbacks took over after the kickoff on their 31, and on the third play QB Jason Allen threw a pass that was intercepted by Bulldog CB Detric Cummings. Douglas led the Bulldogs to the 8–yard line, and Jeff Trinh connected on a 25–yard field goal with 3:28 remaining to take a 10–3 lead. Arkansas threatened on their next possession, but were unable to convert from The Citadel 27–yard line, and the Bulldogs ran the final 1:21 off the clock to seal the win. This was the Bulldogs fifth win over a Division I-A team in their previous six tries.

As a team, the Bulldogs gained 218 yards on the ground and 276 yards overall. Douglas rushed 26 times for 82 yards and finished 5 of 7 in the air for 58 yards. RB Everette Sands carried 11 times for 51 yards. The Razorbacks gained 287 yards, 177 of them on the ground, with Jackson carrying 29 times for a career-high 167 yards and Allen completing 11 of 23 attempts for 110 yards and one interception. The Citadel fumbled four times, losing two, while Arkansas fumbled three times, losing one. The Bulldogs converted 8 of 15 third down attempts, while the Razorbacks converted only 4 of 13. The Citadel won the time of possession battle, holding the ball for 33:13.

After the game, Razorbacks coach Jack Crowe resigned. He was succeeded by Defensive Coordinator Joe Kines.

=== Wofford ===
Team	1	2	3	4	Total
Terriers	0	7	0	6	13
• #12 Bulldogs	0	17	0	13	30

- Date: September 12, 1992
- Location: Johnson Hagood Stadium, Charleston, South Carolina
- Game start: 7:00 P.M. EDT
- Game attendance: 20,710

Scoring summary
2	11:29	CIT	Everette Sands 2-yard run (Jeff Trinh kick)	CIT 7–0
2	8:49	WOF	Brian Taylor 2-yard run (Brian Porzio kick)	7–7
2	6:15	CIT	Cedric Sims 3-yard run (Jeff Trinh kick)	CIT 14–7
2	0:00	CIT	Jeff Trinh 35-yard field goal	17–7
4	14:55	CIT	Everette Sands 17-yard run (kick failed)	23–7
4	4:36	CIT	Jack Douglas 26-yard run (Jeff Trinh kick)	30–7
4	3:18	WOF	Shawn Graves 9-yard run (kick failed)	30–13

The Bulldogs faced Division II Wofford in their home opener. The previous season, the Terriers had upset The Citadel at Johnson Hagood Stadium, with freshman kicker Chad Davis missing three field goals. The story surrounding Davis provided key information for Rick Reilly's article on the Fourth-Class System that was published in the week leading up to the 1992 Wofford game. The key storyline for the week included these distractions and the emotional high of the win over Arkansas, arguably the Bulldogs biggest win as a program. The Terriers were coming off a disappointing 41–27 loss at NAIA power Elon.

Both teams were scoreless in the first quarter, and The Citadel took over at their own 27 yard line after a Wofford punt early in the second quarter. Driving 73 yards on 13 plays, Sands scored on a 2–yard run to put the Bulldogs up 7–0. Wofford responded with their own 73–yard drive later in the quarter to tie the game. The Bulldogs took over on the ensuing kickoff at their own 40 yard line and went 60 yards for a Cedric Sims touchdown and a lead they would not relinquish. Jeff Trinh added a 36–yard field goal as the half expired for a 17–7 lead. Early in the third quarter, Jack Douglas was intercepted by CB Chad Starks, giving Wofford momentum. Five plays later, CB Torrance Forney recorded his second interception of Wofford QB Shawn Graves, this time near the end zone. The Citadel then 98 yards on 17 plays in nearly 8 minutes to take a commanding 23–7 lead. The Bulldogs would recover a fumble in their own territory on the next possession, and drive 72 yards on 7 plays for a fourth touchdown later in the fourth quarter. Wofford scored the final points of the game after a four play, 72-yard drive late in the fourth quarter.

Sands rushed for 117 yards on 25 carries while Douglas carried 16 times for 95 yards and threw for 92 more en route to the 30–13 win. Wofford senior QB Shawn Graves rushed for 149 yards and a touchdown, causing Taaffe to remark, "I'm glad we don't have to play him again." The Citadel defense shut down the Terriers in the air, with Graves completing just one of ten passes for 12 yards and three interceptions. The Bulldogs gained 441 yards to just 288 for Wofford. Taaffe was particularly pleased with the performance in light of all the distractions of the week. Citadel fans were particularly excited about score updates from the Arkansas game at South Carolina, in which the Razorbacks routed the Gamecocks 45–7.

=== East Tennessee State ===
Team	1	2	Total
Buccaneers			0
#7 Bulldogs			0

- Date: September 19, 1992
- Location: Johnson Hagood Stadium, Charleston, South Carolina
- Game start: 7:00 P.M. EDT
- Game attendance: 16,231

The Citadel opened SoCon play against East Tennessee State, which entered at 2–0, 1–0 in conference play. The Buccaneers had defeated VMI 18–16 in their opener at home, and then beat NAIA Mars Hill 21–0 in their first shutout since 1984. ETSU had yet to play a road game.

=== Army ===
Team	1	2	3	4	Total
• #5 Bulldogs	0	6	6	3	15
Black Knights	7	0	7	0	14

- Date: September 26, 1992
- Location: Michie Stadium, West Point, New York
- Game start: 1:30 P.M. EDT
- Game attendance: 37,692

Scoring summary
1	7:49	ARMY	Akill King 2–yard run (Patmon Malcom kick)	ARMY 7–0
2	8:24	CIT	Everette Sands 44-yard run (kick failed)	ARMY 7–6
3	10:39	ARMY	Steve Weber 1-yard run (Malcom kick)	ARMY 14–6
3	5:10	CIT	Cedne Sims 2–yard run (pass failed)	ARMY 14–12
4	2:47	CIT	Jeff Trinh 37-yard field goal	CIT 15–14

In its second game against a team from Division I-A, The Citadel traveled to Army.

=== Appalachian State ===
Team	1	2	3	4	Total
• #4 Bulldogs	0	9	0	16	25
Mountaineers	0	0	0	0	0

- Date: October 3, 1992
- Location: Kidd Brewer Stadium, Boone, North Carolina
- Game start: 1:30 P.M. EDT
- Game attendance: 24,233

Scoring summary
1		CIT	Everette Sands 10–yard run (pass failed)	CIT 6–0
2		CIT	Jeff Trinh 25–yard field goal	CIT 9–0
4		CIT	Trinh 42–yard field goal	CIT 12–0
4	9:50	CIT	Cornell Caldwell 54–yard pass from Jack Douglas (Trinh kick)	CIT 19–0
4	:18	CIT	Terrence Rivers 75–yard run (kick failed)	CIT 25–0

The Citadel travelled to face defending SoCon champion Appalachian State. The Bulldogs had dealt the Mountaineers their only loss in league play in 1991.

=== Chattanooga ===
Team	1	2	3	4	Total
Mocs	7	3	3	0	13
• #2 Bulldogs	12	7	7	7	33

- Date: October 10, 1992
- Location: Johnson Hagood Stadium, Charleston, South Carolina
- Game start: 7:00 P.M. EDT
- Game attendance: 19,622

Scoring summary
1	11:42	UTC	Jerry Ellison 10–yard run (Rodney Allen kick)	UTC 7–0
1	2:45	CIT	Jack Douglas 8–yard run (kick failed)	UTC 7–6
1	1:05	CIT	Douglas 37–yard run (kick failed)	CIT 12–7
2	9:05	UTC	Allen 50–yard field goal	CIT 12–10
2	2:53	CIT	Terrence Rivers 1–yard run (Jeff Trinh kick)	CIT 19–10
3	9:59	UTC	Allen 41–yard field goal	CIT 19–13
3	5:14	CIT	Douglas 1–yard run (Trinh kick)	CIT 26–13
4	13:50	CIT	Douglas 23–yard run (Trinh kick)	CIT 33–13

=== Marshall ===
Team	1	2	3	4	Total
• #9 Thundering Herd	3	14	7	10	34
#2 Bulldogs	3	0	10	0	13

- Date: October 17, 1992
- Location: Johnson Hagood Stadium, Charleston, South Carolina
- Game attendance: 23,025

Scoring summary
1	9:58	MU	David Merrick 20–yard field goal	MU 3–0
1	3:28	CIT	Jeff Trinh 20–yard field goal	TIE 3–3
2	13:10	MU	Michael Payton 24–yard pass to Andy Bowen (Merrick kick)	MU 10–3
2	:49	MU	Orlando Hatchett 3–yard run	MU 17–3
3	8:07	CIT	Jack Douglas 10–yard pass to Marty Fagan (Jeff Trinh kick)	MU 17–10
3	5:49	MU	Hatchett 7–yard run (Merrick kick)	MU 24–10
3	1:18	CIT	Trinh 41–yard field goal	MU 24–13
4	9:35	MU	Payton 2–yard pass to Mike Bartrum (Merrick kick)	MU 31–13
4	4:30	MU	Merrick 32–yard field goal	MU 34–13

In a highly anticipated matchup, the undefeated #4 Bulldogs faced 4–1 and #5 Marshall at Johnson Hagood Stadium. Marshall's only loss was to I-A Missouri, and had won each of their four games against I-AA competition in convincing fashion, with the smallest margin of victory being 18 against VMI. The matchup matched the SoCon statistical leaders in several team categories, such as scoring offense vs scoring defense, total offense vs total defense, passing offense vs passing defense, and rushing offense vs rushing defense. The game was the first pre-announced sellout in Johnson Hagood Stadium history, and just the second since the stadium was constructed in 1948.

Despite a record crowd of 23,025, the Bulldogs fell 34–13.

=== Western Carolina ===
Team	1	2	3	4	Total
• #6 Bulldogs	6	10	6	14	36
Catamounts	7	7	7	10	31

- Date: October 24, 1992
- Location: E. J. Whitmire Stadium, Cullowhee, North Carolina
- Game attendance: 12,818

Scoring summary
1	CIT	Everette Sands 1–yard run (kick blocked)	CIT 6–0
1	WCU	Harold Hines 13–yard run (Phil Shirley kick)	WCU 7–6
2	CIT	Jeff Trinh 46–yard field goal	CIT 9–7
2	CIT	Sands 1–yard run (Trinh kick)	CIT 16–7
2	WCU	Lonnie Galloway 12–yard pass to Craig Aiken (Shirley kick)	CIT 16–14
3	WCU	Kevin Thigpen 1–yard run (Shirley kick)	WCU 21–16
3	CIT	Jack Douglas 1–yard run (pass failed)	CIT 22–21
4	CIT	Lenny Clark 45–yard fumble return (Trinh kick)	CIT 29–21
4	CIT	Torrance Forney 36–yard interception return (Trinh kick)	CIT 36–21
4	WCU	Shirley 30–yard field goal	CIT 36–24
4	WCU	Galloway 65 yard pass to Aiken (Shirley kick)	CIT 36–31

=== Newberry ===
Team	1	2	Total
Indians			0
#4 Bulldogs			0

- Date: November 7, 1992
- Location: Johnson Hagood Stadium, Charleston, South Carolina
- Game attendance: 14,757

=== VMI ===
Team	1	2	3	4	Total
Keydets	0	0	0	0	0
• #1 Bulldogs	13	20	7	10	50

- Date: November 14, 1992
- Location: Johnson Hagood Stadium, Charleston, South Carolina
- Game start: 2:00 P.M. EDT
- Game attendance: 21,811

Scoring summary
1	11:27	CIT	Cedric Sims 12–yard run (Jeff Trinh kick)	CIT 7–0
1	:21	CIT	Erick Little 4–yard run (kick failed)	CIT 13–0
2	14:11	CIT	Everette Sands 1–yard run (kick failed)	CIT 19–0
2	9:22	CIT	Jack Douglass 60–yard pass to Cornell Caldwell (John Cahill kick)	CIT 26–0
2	1:04	CIT	Undra Mitchem 4–yard run (Cahill kick)	CIT 33–0
3	11:26	CIT	Douglas 48–yard run (Cahill kick)	CIT 40–0
4	14:57	CIT	Trinh 27–yard field goal	CIT 43–0
4	4:45	CIT	Travis Jervey 32–yard run (Cahill kick)	CIT 50–0

The Bulldogs won their ninth game of the season, securing the largest number of wins in program history. After Jeff Trinh missed two of his first three extra point attempts, freshman John Cahill replaced him on extra points and connected on all four of his attempts. This was Cahill's first collegiate appearance.

=== Furman ===
Team	1	2	3	4	Total
• #1 Bulldogs	13	0	7	0	20
Paladins	0	0	7	7	14

- Date: November 21, 1992
- Location: Paladin Stadium, Greenville, South Carolina
- Game start: 1:30 p.m. EDT
- Game attendance: 16,464

Scoring summary
1	10:01	CIT	Cedric Sims 20-yard run (kick failed)	CIT 6–0
1	1:42	CIT	Jack Douglas 5-yard run (John Cahill kick)	CIT 13–0
3	9:24	FUR	Carl Tremble 21-yard run (Jim Richter kick)	CIT 13–7
3	1:45	CIT	Everette Sands 20-yard run (Cahill kick)	CIT 20–7
4	4:51	FUR	Trimble 7-yard run (Richter kick)	CIT20–14

The Bulldogs clinched the Southern Conference championship with the win over Furman, for their second title in program history.

=== Division I-AA Playoffs: North Carolina A&T ===
Team	1	2	Total
#15 Aggies			0
#1 Bulldogs			0

- Date: November 28, 1992
- Location: Johnson Hagood Stadium, Charleston, South Carolina
- Game start: 1:00 P.M. EDT
- Game attendance: 12,300

=== Division I-AA Playoffs: Youngstown State ===
Team	1	2	Total
#6 Penguins			0
#1 Bulldogs			0

- Date: December 5, 1992
- Location: Johnson Hagood Stadium, Charleston, South Carolina
- Game attendance: 13,021

== Roster ==
1992 The Citadel Bulldogs football team roster
Players
Coaches
Offense

Pos.	#	Name	Class
WR	1	Damond Boatwright	Jr
RB	3	Cedric Sims	Sr
QB	14	Jack Douglas	Sr
RB	19	Terrance Rivers	So
FB	34	Everette Sands	Jr
HB	38	Erick Little	So
G	64	Shayne Stephens	Jr
OT	68	David Morrelli	Sr
OT	72	Carey Cash	Sr
C	73	Brett Copeland	Sr
G	78	Lance Hansen	Sr
TE	81	Marty Fagan	Sr
WR	88	Cornell Caldwell	Sr
RB		Travis Jervey	Fr

Defense

Pos.	#	Name	Class
CB	7	Detric Cummings	Jr
CB	9	Terrence Forney	Sr
LB	12	Mike Wideman	Jr
FS	15	Lester Smith	Sr
SS	21	Dan Johnson	Jr
LB	41	Micah Young	So
DE	46	Garrett Sizer	Jr
LB	65	Rob Briggs	Sr
DE	66	Judson Boehmer	Jr
DT	97	Jake Erhard	Jr
DT	98	LaQuincy Powell	Jr
DT		Brad Keeney	Fr

Special teams

Pos.	#	Name	Class
K	4	Jeff Trinh	Fr
P	13	Eric Willingham	Sr

Head coach

- Charlie Taaffe

Coordinators/assistant coaches

- Don Powers (DC)
- Marty Long (DL, OLB)

Legend

- (C) Team captain
- (S) Suspended
- (I) Ineligible
- Injured
- Redshirt

== Honors and awards ==
The following awards were bestowed at the end of the season:

- Eddie Robinson Award – Charlie Taaffe
- AP All-Americans – Carey Cash, Lester Smith
- Walter Camp All-Americans – Carey Cash, Terrence Forney, Lance Hansen, Lester Smith
- The Sports Network All-Americans – Carey Cash, Lance Hansen, Lester Smith

== Ranking movements ==
Ranking movements Legend: ██ Increase in ranking ██ Decrease in ranking — = Not ranked
	Week												
Poll	Pre	1	2	3	4	5	6	7	8	9	10	11	Final
I-AA Committee	—		9	8	6	5	4	6	6	3	2	1	1
Sports Network	—	12	7	5	4	2	2	6		4	1	1	1
