= 1992 Delaware Fightin' Blue Hens football team =

American college football season

1992 Delaware Fightin' Blue Hens football

Yankee Conference champion ECAC Team of the Year

NCAA Division I-AA Semifinal, L 7–28 at Marshall
- Conference: Yankee Conference
- Record: 11–3 (7–1 Yankee)
- Head coach: Tubby Raymond (27th season)
- Offensive coordinator: Ted Kempski (25th season)
- Offensive scheme: Delaware Wing-T
- Defensive coordinator: Bob Sabol (2nd season)
- Base defense: 4–3
- Home stadium: Delaware Stadium

1992 Yankee Conference football standings
	Conf.					Overall
Team	W		L		T	W		L		T
No. 8 Delaware $^	7	–	1	–	0	11	–	3	–	0
No. 10 Villanova ^	6	–	2	–	0	9	–	3	–	0
UMass	5	–	3	–	0	7	–	3	–	0
Richmond	5	–	3	–	0	7	–	4	–	0
Maine	4	–	4	–	0	6	–	5	–	0
Connecticut	4	–	4	–	0	6	–	5	–	0
New Hampshire	3	–	5	–	0	5	–	5	–	1
Boston University	2	–	6	–	0	3	–	8	–	0
Rhode Island	0	–	8	–	0	1	–	10	–	0
$ – Conference champion; ^ – NCAA Division I-AA playoff participant; Rankings from NCAA Division I-AA Football Committee poll

The 1992 Delaware Fightin' Blue Hens football team represented the University of Delaware as a member of the Yankee Conference during the 1992 NCAA Division I-AA football season. Led by 27th-year head coach Tubby Raymond, the Fightin' Blue Hens compiled an overall record of 11–3 with a mark of 7–1 in conference play, winning the Yankee Conference title. Delaware advanced to the NCAA Division I-AA Football Championship playoffs, where the Fightin' Blue Hens beat Samford in the first round and Northeast Louisiana in the quarterfinals before for losing to the eventual national champion, Marshall, in the semifinals. The team played home games at Delaware Stadium in Newark, Delaware.

== Schedule ==
Date	Opponent	Rank	Site	Result	Attendance	Source
September 12	UMass	No. 9	Delaware Stadium; Newark, DE	W 33–13	17,299	
September 19	Rhode Island	No. 8	Delaware Stadium; Newark, DE	W 31–14	15,673	
September 26	West Chester*	No. 7	Delaware Stadium; Newark, DE (rivalry)	L 20–21	15,331	
October 3	at New Hampshire	No. 12	Cowell Stadium; Durham, NH	W 42–22	8,709	
October 10	Boston University^{†}	No. 12	Delaware Stadium; Newark, DE	W 49–14	20,614	
October 17	at No. 2 Villanova	No. 12	Villanova Stadium; Villanova, PA (Battle of the Blue)	W 21–20	12,000	
October 24	at Navy*	No. 7	Navy–Marine Corps Memorial Stadium; Annapolis, MD	W 37–21	32,189	
October 31	at Maine	No. 7	Alumni Field; Orono, ME	W 57–13	5,327	
November 7	Connecticut	No. 6	Delaware Stadium; Newark, DE	W 33–7	22,911	
November 14	at Richmond	No. 3	University of Richmond Stadium; Richmond, VA	L 21–29	15,822	
November 21	Towson State*	No. 10	Delaware Stadium; Newark, DE	W 55–27	15,262	
November 28	No. 9 Samford*	No. 8	Delaware Stadium; Newark, DE (NCAA Division I-AA First Round)	W 56–21	11,364	
December 5	at No. 2 Northeast Louisiana*	No. 8	Malone Stadium; Monroe, LA (NCAA Division I-AA Quarterfinal)	W 41–18	10,172	
December 12	at No. 6 Marshall*	No. 8	Marshall University Stadium; Huntington, WV (NCAA Division I-AA Semifinal)	L 7–28	16,323	
*Non-conference game; ^{†}Homecoming; Rankings from NCAA Division I-AA Football Committee Poll released prior to the game

== Roster ==
1992 Delaware Fightin' Blue Hens football team roster
Players
Coaches
Offense

Pos.	#	Name	Class
WR	2	Keita Malloy	Jr
RB	3	Pat Williams	Fr
C	52	David Frost	Sr
WR	82	Dan Cooper	Jr

Defense

Pos.	#	Name	Class
DB	11	Tim Jacobs	Sr
DB	17	Mike Ryan	Fr

Special teams

Pos.	#	Name	Class

Head coach

- Tubby Raymond

Coordinators/assistant coaches

Legend

- (C) Team captain
- (S) Suspended
- (I) Ineligible
- Injured
- Redshirt

Roster
