= 1992 Cal State Northridge Matadors football team =

American college football season

1992 Cal State Northridge Matadors football
- Conference: Western Football Conference
- Record: 5–5 (3–2 WFC)
- Head coach: Bob Burt (7th season)
- Defensive coordinator: Mark Banker (10th season)
- Home stadium: North Campus Stadium

1992 Western Football Conference standings
| | Conf. | | | | | Overall |
| Team | W | | L | | T | W | | L | | T |
|---|---|---|---|---|---|---|---|---|---|---|
| No. 19 Portland State $^ | 3 | – | 1 | – | 0 | 9 | – | 4 | – | 0 |
| No. 11 Sacramento State | 3 | – | 2 | – | 0 | 7 | – | 3 | – | 0 |
| Cal State Northridge | 3 | – | 2 | – | 0 | 5 | – | 5 | – | 0 |
| Southern Utah | 2 | – | 3 | – | 0 | 6 | – | 5 | – | 0 |
| Cal Poly | 2 | – | 3 | – | 0 | 4 | – | 5 | – | 1 |
| Santa Clara | 1 | – | 3 | – | 0 | 4 | – | 6 | – | 0 |
$ – Conference champion; ^ – NCAA Division II playoff participant; Rankings from NCAA Division II Football Committee poll

The 1992 Cal State Northridge Matadors football team represented California State University, Northridge as a member of the Western Football Conference (WFC) during the 1992 NCAA Division II football season. Led by seventh-year head coach Bob Burt, Cal State Northridge compiled an overall record of 5–5 with a mark of 3–2 in conference play, tying for second place in the WFC. The team was outscored by its opponents 224 to 161 for the season. The Matadors played home games at North Campus Stadium in Northridge, California.

The WFC folded after 1992, in part because of a new NCAA rule that prohibited member institutions who competed at the NCAA Division I level in other sports to compete at the NCAA Division II level in football. Four WFC members (Cal State Northridge, Sacramento State, Cal Poly, and Southern Utah) joined UC Davis as charter members of the NCAA Division I American West Conference in 1993.

== Schedule ==
| Date | Opponent | Site | Result | Attendance | Source |
|---|---|---|---|---|---|
| September 5 | at Cal State Fullerton* | Titan Stadium; Fullerton, CA | L 7–28 | 8,279 | |
| September 12 | UC Davis* | North Campus Stadium; Northridge, CA | W 16–14 | 3,417 | |
| September 19 | San Francisco State* | North Campus Stadium; Northridge, CA | W 22–6 | 3,367 | |
| September 26 | at Central Oklahoma* | Wantland Stadium; Edmond, OK | L 0–14 | 4,527 | |
| October 3 | at No. 5 (I-AA) Idaho* | Kibbie Dome; Moscow, ID | L 7–30 | 6,700 | |
| October 17 | at Santa Clara | Buck Shaw Stadium; Santa Clara, CA | W 42–18 | 4,124 | |
| October 24 | Cal Poly | North Campus Stadium; Northridge, CA | W 14–13 | 6,217 | |
| October 31 | at Southern Utah | Eccles Coliseum; Cedar City, UT | L 20–49 | 3,085 | |
| November 7 | Portland State | North Campus Stadium; Northridge, CA | L 10–35 | 1,804 | |
| November 14 | No. 11 Sacramento State | North Campus Stadium; Northridge, CA | W 23–17 | 2,633 | |
*Non-conference game; Rankings from NCAA Division II Football Committee Poll released prior to the game
