= 1992 Cal State Hayward Pioneers football team =

American college football season

1992 Cal State Hayward Pioneers football
- Conference: Northern California Athletic Conference
- Record: 5–5 (3–2 NCAC)
- Head coach: Tim Tierney (18th season)
- Home stadium: Pioneer Stadium

1992 Northern California Athletic Conference football standings
	Conf.					Overall
Team	W		L		T	W		L		T
No. 7 UC Davis $^	5	–	0	–	0	8	–	2	–	1
Sonoma State	3	–	2	–	0	7	–	3	–	0
Humboldt State	3	–	2	–	0	7	–	4	–	0
Cal State Hayward	3	–	2	–	0	5	–	5	–	0
San Francisco State	1	–	4	–	0	2	–	7	–	0
Chico State	0	–	5	–	0	1	–	9	–	0
$ – Conference champion; ^ – NCAA Division II playoff participant; Rankings from NCAA Division II Football Committee poll

The 1992 Cal State Hayward Pioneers football team represented California State University, Hayward—now known as California State University, East Bay—as a member of the Northern California Athletic Conference (NCAC) during the 1992 NCAA Division II football season. Led by 18th-year head coach Tim Tierney, Cal State Hayward compiled an overall record of 5–5 with a mark of 3–2 in conference play, placing in a three-way tie for second in the NCAC. The team was outscored by its opponents 246 to 227 for the season. The Pioneers played home games at Pioneer Stadium in Hayward, California.

== Schedule ==
Date	Opponent	Site	Result	Attendance	Source
September 5	at San Diego*	Torero Stadium; San Diego, CA	L 13–14	3,000	
September 12	Saint Mary's*	Pioneer Stadium; Hayward, CA	L 6–10	600	
September 19	Azusa Pacific*	Pioneer Stadium; Hayward, CA	W 33–25	400	
September 26	at Cal Poly*	Mustang Stadium; San Luis Obispo, CA	L 3–35	2,000–5,323	
October 3	at Redlands*	Ted Runner Stadium; Redlands, CA	W 22–8	500	
October 17	at Chico State	University Stadium; Chico, CA	W 24–21	3,000	
October 24	at Sonoma State	Cossacks Stadium (Note: Seawolf Stadium was known as Cossacks Stadium until 2002 when the University changed the mascot from Cossacks to Seawolves.); Rohnert Park, CA	L 20–37	1,096–2,500	
October 31	San Francisco State	Pioneer Stadium; Hayward, CA	W 41–22	2,000	
November 7	at Humboldt State	Redwood Bowl; Arcata, CA	W 38–36	1,800–1,802	
November 14	No. T–7 UC Davis	Pioneer Stadium; Hayward, CA	L 27–38	6,000–7,000	
*Non-conference game; Rankings from NCAA Division II Football Committee Poll released prior to the game
