= 1992 Humboldt State Lumberjacks football team =

American college football season

1992 Humboldt State Lumberjacks football
- Conference: Northern California Athletic Conference
- Record: 7–4 (3–2 NCAC)
- Head coach: Fred Whitmire (2nd season)
- Home stadium: Redwood Bowl

1992 Northern California Athletic Conference football standings
	Conf.					Overall
Team	W		L		T	W		L		T
No. T–7 UC Davis $^	5	–	0	–	0	8	–	2	–	1
Sonoma State	3	–	2	–	0	7	–	3	–	0
Humboldt State	3	–	2	–	0	7	–	4	–	0
Cal State Hayward	3	–	2	–	0	5	–	5	–	0
San Francisco State	1	–	4	–	0	2	–	7	–	0
Chico State	0	–	5	–	0	1	–	9	–	0
$ – Conference champion; ^ – NCAA Division II playoff participant; Rankings from NCAA Division II Football Committee poll

The 1992 Humboldt State Lumberjacks football team represented Humboldt State University—now known as California State Polytechnic University, Humboldt—as a member of the Northern California Athletic Conference (NCAC) during the 1992 NCAA Division II football season. Led by second-year head coach Fred Whitmire, the Lumberjacks compiled an overall record of 7–4 with a mark of 3–2 in conference play, placing in a three-way tie for second in the NCAC. The team outscored its opponents 292 to 261 for the season. Humboldt State played home games at the Redwood Bowl in Arcata, California.

== Schedule ==
Date	Opponent	Site	Result	Attendance	Source
September 5	at Azusa Pacific*	Cougar Athletic Stadium; Azusa, CA	L 24–7	1,235	
September 12	Western Montana*	Redwood Bowl; Arcata, CA	L 41–21	3,948	
September 19	at Saint Mary’s*	Saint Mary's Stadium; Moraga, CA	L 6–43	2,167	
September 26	at Southern Oregon*	Fuller Field; Ashland, OR	W 36–16	2,800	
October 3	Santa Clara*	Redwood Bowl; Arcata, CA	L 10–14	3,872	
October 10	Whitworth*	Redwood Bowl; Arcata, CA	W 38–36	2,136	
October 17	at San Francisco State	Cox Stadium; San Francisco, CA	W 24–14	1,500	
October 24	No. 13 UC Davis	Redwood Bowl; Arcata, CA	L 31–58	4,272	
October 31	at Sonoma State	Cossacks Stadium (Note: Seawolf Stadium was known as Cossacks Stadium until 2002 when the University changed the mascot from Cossacks to Seawolves.); Rohnert Park, CA	W 19–7	921	
November 7	Cal State Hayward	Redwood Bowl; Arcata, CA	L 36–38	1,800–1,802	
November 14	Chico State	Redwood Bowl; Arcata, CA	W 27–7	3,178	
*Non-conference game; Rankings from NCAA Division II Football Committee Poll released prior to the game
