= 1992 Santa Clara Broncos football team =

American college football season

1992 Santa Clara Broncos football
- Conference: Western Football Conference
- Record: 4–6 (1–3 WFC)
- Head coach: Terry Malley (8th season)
- Home stadium: Buck Shaw Stadium

1992 Western Football Conference standings
	Conf.					Overall
Team	W		L		T	W		L		T
No. 19 Portland State $^	3	–	1	–	0	9	–	4	–	0
No. 11 Sacramento State	3	–	2	–	0	7	–	3	–	0
Cal State Northridge	3	–	2	–	0	5	–	5	–	0
Southern Utah	2	–	3	–	0	6	–	5	–	0
Cal Poly	2	–	3	–	0	4	–	5	–	1
Santa Clara	1	–	3	–	0	4	–	6	–	0
$ – Conference champion; ^ – NCAA Division II playoff participant; Rankings from NCAA Division II Football Committee poll

The 1992 Santa Clara Broncos football team represented Santa Clara University during the 1992 NCAA Division II football season. The Broncos were led by eighth-year head coach Terry Malley and played home games on campus at Buck Shaw Stadium in Santa Clara, California. Santa Clara finished the season with a record of four wins and six losses (4–6, 1–3 WFC), and were outscored by their opponents 245–334 for the season.

Santa Clara competed in the last year of the Western Football Conference (WFC). The WFC folded in part because of a new NCAA rule that prohibited member institutions who competed at the Division I (D-I) level in other sports to compete at the Division II (D-II) level in football. Rather than move up to D-I for football, the university discontinued the football program after this season. Rival Saint Mary's continued its football program as an NCAA Division I-AA independent for 11 more seasons.

In eight seasons as head coach of the Broncos, Malley compiled a 47–39–1 (.546) record.

== Schedule ==
Date	Opponent	Site	Result	Attendance	Source
September 5	at Chico State*	University Stadium; Chico, CA	W 35–25	4,112	
September 12	Sonoma State*	Buck Shaw Stadium; Santa Clara, CA	L 7–27	1,100	
September 19	UC Davis*	Buck Shaw Stadium; Santa Clara, CA	L 44–48	6,372	
September 26	San Francisco State*	Buck Shaw Stadium; Santa Clara, CA	W 42–30	3,064	
October 3	at Humboldt State*	Redwood Bowl; Arcata, CA	W 14–10	3,782	
October 10	Southern Utah	Buck Shaw Stadium; Santa Clara, CA	W 28–25	2,985	
October 17	Cal State Northridge	Buck Shaw Stadium; Santa Clara, CA	L 18–42	4,124	
October 31	Cal Poly	Buck Shaw Stadium; Santa Clara, CA	L 14–40	2,755	
November 7	at No. 13 Sacramento State	Hornet Stadium; Sacramento, CA	L 21–32	2,727	
November 14	at Saint Mary's*	Saint Mary's Stadium; Moraga, CA	L 22–55	5,439	
*Non-conference game; Rankings from NCAA Division II Football Committee Poll released prior to the game
