= 1992 Northwestern State Demons football team =

American college football season

1992 Northwestern State Demons football
- Conference: Southland Conference
- Record: 7–4 (4–3 Southland)
- Head coach: Sam Goodwin (10th season)
- Home stadium: Harry Turpin Stadium

1992 Southland Conference football standings
	Conf.					Overall
Team	W		L		T	W		L		T
No. 1 Northeast Louisiana $^	7	–	0	–	0	10	–	3	–	0
No. 11 McNeese State ^	6	–	1	–	0	9	–	4	–	0
Northwestern State	4	–	3	–	0	7	–	4	–	0
Sam Houston State	3	–	2	–	2	6	–	3	–	2
North Texas	3	–	4	–	0	4	–	7	–	0
Southwest Texas State	2	–	4	–	1	5	–	5	–	1
Stephen F. Austin	1	–	6	–	0	3	–	8	–	0
Nicholls State	0	–	6	–	1	1	–	9	–	1
$ – Conference champion; ^ – NCAA Division I-AA playoff participant; Rankings from NCAA Division I-AA Football Committee poll

The 1992 Northwestern State Demons football team was an American football team that represented Northwestern State University as a member of the Southland Conference during the 1992 NCAA Division I-AA football season. In their tenth year under head coach Sam Goodwin, the team compiled an overall record of 7–4, with a mark of 4–3 in conference play, and finished third in the Southland.

== Schedule ==
Date	Opponent	Site	Result	Attendance	Source
September 5	No. 7 (D-II) Mississippi College*	Harry Turpin Stadium; Natchitoches, LA	W 27–6		
September 12	at Troy State*	Veterans Memorial Stadium; Troy, AL	L 19–38	7,200	
September 26	No. 17 (D-II) East Texas State*	Harry Turpin Stadium; Natchitoches, LA	W 20–0	10,200	
October 3	at Arkansas State*	Indian Stadium; Jonesboro, AR	W 24–18	16,300	
October 10	at North Texas	Fouts Field; Denton, TX	W 37–34	13,250	
October 17	at McNeese State	Cowboy Stadium; Lake Charles, LA (rivalry)	L 0–29		
October 24	No. 5 Northeast Louisiana	Harry Turpin Stadium; Natchitoches, LA (rivalry)	L 18–28		
October 31	Southwest Texas State	Harry Turpin Stadium; Natchitoches, LA	W 20–17		
November 7	Sam Houston State	Harry Turpin Stadium; Natchitoches, LA	L 19–42		
November 14	Nicholls State	Harry Turpin Stadium; Natchitoches, LA (rivalry)	W 44–6	4,800	
November 21	at Stephen F. Austin	Homer Bryce Stadium; Nacogdoches, TX (rivalry)	W 24–10		
*Non-conference game; Rankings from NCAA Division I-AA Football Committee Poll released prior to the game
