= 1992 Nicholls State Colonels football team =

American college football season

1992 Nicholls State Colonels football
- Conference: Southland Conference
- Record: 1–9–1 (0–6–1 Southland)
- Head coach: Phil Greco (6th season)
- Home stadium: John L. Guidry Stadium

1992 Southland Conference football standings
	Conf.					Overall
Team	W		L		T	W		L		T
No. 1 Northeast Louisiana $^	7	–	0	–	0	10	–	3	–	0
No. 11 McNeese State ^	6	–	1	–	0	9	–	4	–	0
Northwestern State	4	–	3	–	0	7	–	4	–	0
Sam Houston State	3	–	2	–	2	6	–	3	–	2
North Texas	3	–	4	–	0	4	–	7	–	0
Southwest Texas State	2	–	4	–	1	5	–	5	–	1
Stephen F. Austin	1	–	6	–	0	3	–	8	–	0
Nicholls State	0	–	6	–	1	1	–	9	–	1
$ – Conference champion; ^ – NCAA Division I-AA playoff participant; Rankings from NCAA Division I-AA Football Committee poll

The 1992 Nicholls State Colonels football team represented Nicholls State University as a member of the Southland Conference during the 1992 NCAA Division I-AA football season. Led by Phil Greco in his sixth and final season as head coach, the Colonels compiled an overall record of 1–9–1 with mark of 0–6–1 in conference play, placing last out of eight teams in the Southland. Nicholls State played home games at John L. Guidry Stadium in Thibodaux, Louisiana.

== Schedule ==
Date	Opponent	Site	Result	Attendance	Source
September 5	Northeast Louisiana	John L. Guidry Stadium; Thibodaux, LA	L 10–38		
September 12	at No. 9 (D-II) Texas A&I*	Javelina Stadium; Kingsville, TX	L 12–50	8,500	
September 26	No. 19 McNeese State	John L. Guidry Stadium; Thibodaux, LA	L 17–21		
October 3	at No. 16 Southwest Texas State	Bobcat Stadium; San Marcos, TX (rivalry)	L 13–38		
October 10	Sam Houston State	John L. Guidry Stadium; Thibodaux, LA	T 19–19	4,207	
October 17	at UCF*	Florida Citrus Bowl; Orlando, FL	L 18–42		
October 24	at Stephen F. Austin	Homer Bryce Stadium; Nacogdoches, TX	L 6–21		
October 31	Southern*	John L. Guidry Stadium; Thibodaux, LA	W 27–24		
November 7	North Texas	Fouts Field; Denton, TX	L 3–31		
November 14	Northwestern State	Harry Turpin Stadium; Natchitoches, LA (rivalry)	L 6–44	4,800	
November 21	at Troy State*	John L. Guidry Stadium; Thibodaux, LA	L 0–21	2,005	
*Non-conference game; Rankings from NCAA Division I-AA Football Committee Poll released prior to the game
