= 1992 San Francisco State Gators football team =

American college football season

1992 San Francisco State Gators football
- Conference: Northern California Athletic Conference
- Record: 2–7 (1–4 NCAC)
- Head coach: Dick Mannini (1st season)
- Home stadium: Cox Stadium

1992 Northern California Athletic Conference football standings
	Conf.					Overall
Team	W		L		T	W		L		T
No. 7 UC Davis $^	5	–	0	–	0	8	–	2	–	1
Sonoma State	3	–	2	–	0	7	–	3	–	0
Humboldt State	3	–	2	–	0	7	–	4	–	0
Cal State Hayward	3	–	2	–	0	5	–	5	–	0
San Francisco State	1	–	4	–	0	2	–	7	–	0
Chico State	0	–	5	–	0	1	–	9	–	0
$ – Conference champion; ^ – NCAA Division II playoff participant; Rankings from NCAA Division II Football Committee poll

The 1992 San Francisco State Gators football team represented San Francisco State University as a member of the Northern California Athletic Conference (NCAC) during the 1992 NCAA Division II football season. Led by first-year head coach Dick Mannini, San Francisco State compiled an overall record of 2–7 with a mark of 1–4 in conference play, placing fifth in the NCAC. For the season the team was outscored by its opponents 256 to 185. The Gators played home games at Cox Stadium in San Francisco.

== Schedule ==
Date	Opponent	Site	Result	Attendance	Source
September 5	at Saint Mary's*	Saint Mary's Stadium; Moraga, CA	L 14–27	1,735	
September 19	at Cal State Northridge*	North Campus Stadium; Northridge, CA	L 6–22	3,367	
September 26	at Santa Clara*	Buck Shaw Stadium; Santa Clara, CA	L 30–42	3,064	
October 10	Menlo*	Cox Stadium; [San Francisco, CA	W 14–7	1,521	
October 17	Humboldt State	Cox Stadium; San Francisco, CA	L 14–24	1,500	
October 24	Chico State	Cox Stadium; San Francisco, CA	W 43–28	1,250	
October 31	at Cal State Hayward	Pioneer Stadium; Hayward, CA	L 22–41	2,000	
November 7	No. 11 UC Davis	Cox Stadium; San Francisco, CA	L 14–42	3,038	
November 14	at Sonoma State	Cossacks Park; Rohnert Park, CA	L 28–33	871	
*Non-conference game; Rankings from NCAA Division II Football Committee Poll released prior to the game
