= 1992 Cal Poly Mustangs football team =

American college football season

1992 Cal Poly Mustangs football
- Conference: Western Football Conference
- Record: 4–5–1 (2–3 WFC)
- Head coach: Lyle Setencich (6th season)
- Home stadium: Mustang Stadium

1992 Western Football Conference standings
| | Conf. | | | | | Overall |
| Team | W | | L | | T | W | | L | | T |
|---|---|---|---|---|---|---|---|---|---|---|
| No. 19 Portland State $^ | 3 | – | 1 | – | 0 | 9 | – | 4 | – | 0 |
| No. 11 Sacramento State | 3 | – | 2 | – | 0 | 7 | – | 3 | – | 0 |
| Cal State Northridge | 3 | – | 2 | – | 0 | 5 | – | 5 | – | 0 |
| Southern Utah | 2 | – | 3 | – | 0 | 6 | – | 5 | – | 0 |
| Cal Poly | 2 | – | 3 | – | 0 | 4 | – | 5 | – | 1 |
| Santa Clara | 1 | – | 3 | – | 0 | 4 | – | 6 | – | 0 |
$ – Conference champion; ^ – NCAA Division II playoff participant; Rankings from NCAA Division II Football Committee poll

The 1992 Cal Poly Mustangs football team represented California Polytechnic State University, San Luis Obispo as a member of the Western Football Conference (WFC) during the 1992 NCAA Division II football season. Led by sixth-year head coach Lyle Setencich, Cal Poly compiled an overall record of 4–5–1 with a mark of 2–3 in conference play, tying for fourth place in the WFC. The team outscored its opponents 253 to 217 for the season. The Mustangs played home games at Mustang Stadium in San Luis Obispo, California.

The WFC folded after 1992, in part because of a new National Collegiate Athletic Association (NCAA) rule that prohibited member institutions who competed at the NCAA Division I level in other sports to compete at the NCAA Division II level in football. Four WFC members—Cal State Northridge, Sacramento State, Cal Poly, and Southern Utah—joined with UC Davis as charter members of the Division-I American West Conference in 1993.

== Schedule ==
| Date | Opponent | Site | Result | Attendance | Source |
|---|---|---|---|---|---|
| September 12 | at No. 8 North Dakota State* | Dacotah Field; Fargo, ND | L 10–26 | 13,211 | |
| September 19 | at Chico State* | University Stadium; Chico, CA | W 41–10 | | |
| September 26 | Cal State Hayward* | Mustang Stadium; San Luis Obispo, CA | W 35–3 | 5,323 | |
| October 3 | No. 16 Sonoma State* | Mustang Stadium; San Luis Obispo, CA | L 35–36 | 4,170 | |
| October 10 | at UC Davis* | Toomey Field; Davis, CA (rivalry) | T 31–31 | 5,500 | |
| October 17 | Sacramento State | Mustang Stadium; San Luis Obispo, CA | L 0–24 | 6,484 | |
| October 24 | at Cal State Northridge | North Campus Stadium; Northridge, CA | L 13–14 | 6,217 | |
| October 31 | at Santa Clara | Buck Shaw Stadium; Santa Clara, CA | W 40–14 | 2,755 | |
| November 7 | Southern Utah | Mustang Stadium; San Luis Obispo, CA | W 17–14 | | |
| November 14 | at No. 18 Portland State | Civic Stadium; Portland, OR | L 31–45 | | |
*Non-conference game; Rankings from NCAA Division II Football Committee Poll released prior to the game

== Team players in the NFL ==
The following Cal Poly Mustang players were selected in the 1993 NFL draft.

| Player | Position | Round | Overall | NFL team |
| Brian Roche | Tight end | 3 | 81 | San Diego Chargers |
