= 1992 Chico State Wildcats football team =

American college football season

1992 Chico State Wildcats football
- Conference: Northern California Athletic Conference
- Record: 1–9 (0–5 NCAC)
- Head coach: Gary Hauser (4th season)
- Home stadium: University Stadium

1992 Northern California Athletic Conference football standings
	Conf.					Overall
Team	W		L		T	W		L		T
No. 7 UC Davis $^	5	–	0	–	0	8	–	2	–	1
Sonoma State	3	–	2	–	0	7	–	3	–	0
Humboldt State	3	–	2	–	0	7	–	4	–	0
Cal State Hayward	3	–	2	–	0	5	–	5	–	0
San Francisco State	1	–	4	–	0	2	–	7	–	0
Chico State	0	–	5	–	0	1	–	9	–	0
$ – Conference champion; ^ – NCAA Division II playoff participant; Rankings from NCAA Division II Football Committee poll

The 1992 Chico State Wildcats football team represented California State University, Chico as a member of the Northern California Athletic Conference (NCAC) during the 1992 NCAA Division II football season. Led by fourth-year head coach Gary Hauser, Chico State compiled an overall record of 1–9 with a mark of 0–5 in conference play, placing last out of six teams in the NCAC. The team was outscored by its opponents 353 to 199 for the season. The Wildcats played home games at University Stadium in Chico, California.

== Schedule ==
Date	Opponent	Site	Result	Attendance	Source
September 5	Santa Clara*	University Stadium; Chico, CA	L 25–35	4,112	
September 12	at No. 19 (I-AA) Montana*	Washington–Grizzly Stadium; Missoula, MT	L 0–41	11,294	
September 19	Cal Poly*	University Stadium; Chico, CA	L 10–41		
October 3	Saint Mary’s*	University Stadium; Chico, CA	W 28–21	1,200	
October 10	at Sacramento State	Hornet Stadium; Sacramento, CA	L 20–36	4,697–5,591	
October 17	Cal State Hayward	University Stadium; Chico, CA	L 21–24	3,000	
October 24	at San Francisco State*	Cox Stadium; San Francisco, CA	L 28–43	1,250	
October 31	at No. 15 UC Davis	Toomey Field; Davis, CA	L 37–44	4,050	
November 7	Sonoma State	University Stadium; Chico, CA	L 23–41	1,443	
November 14	at Humboldt State	Redwood Bowl; Arcata, CA	L 7–27		
*Non-conference game; Rankings from NCAA Division II Football Committee Poll released prior to the game
