= 1992 Northern Arizona Lumberjacks football team =

American college football season

1992 Northern Arizona Lumberjacks football
- Conference: Big Sky Conference
- Record: 4–7 (2–5 Big Sky)
- Head coach: Steve Axman (3rd season)
- Home stadium: Walkup Skydome

1992 Big Sky Conference football standings
	Conf.					Overall
Team	W		L		T	W		L		T
No. 5 Idaho +^	6	–	1	–	0	9	–	3	–	0
No. 14 Eastern Washington +^	6	–	1	–	0	7	–	4	–	0
Montana	4	–	3	–	0	6	–	5	–	0
Weber State	4	–	3	–	0	6	–	5	–	0
Boise State	3	–	4	–	0	5	–	6	–	0
Montana State	2	–	5	–	0	4	–	7	–	0
Northern Arizona	2	–	5	–	0	4	–	7	–	0
Idaho State	1	–	6	–	0	3	–	8	–	0
+ – Conference co-champions; ^ – NCAA Division I-AA playoff participant; Rankings from NCAA Division I-AA Football Committee poll

The 1992 Northern Arizona Lumberjacks football team represented Northern Arizona University as a member of the Big Sky Conference during the 1992 NCAA Division I-AA football season. Led by third-year head coach Steve Axman, the Lumberjacks compiled an overall record of 4–7, with a mark of 2–5 in conference play, and finished tied for sixth in the Big Sky.

== Schedule ==
Date	Opponent	Site	Result	Attendance	Source
September 5	Southern Utah*	Walkup Skydome; Flagstaff, AZ	L 17–20	4,811	
September 12	Northeastern*	Walkup Skydome; Flagstaff, AZ	W 21–14	6,377	
September 19	at UNLV*	Sam Boyd Silver Bowl; Whitney, NV	L 7–40	15,584	
September 26	Idaho State	Walkup Skydome; Flagstaff, AZ	W 27–12	8,016	
October 3	at Montana State	Sales Stadium; Bozeman, MT	W 13–9	9,787	
October 10	Boise State	Walkup Skydome; Flagstaff, AZ	L 14–20	12,937	
October 17	at Montana	Washington–Grizzly Stadium; Missoula, MT	L 27–28	10,073	
October 24	No. T–20 Eastern Washington	Walkup Skydome; Flagstaff, AZ	L 9–15	9,117	
October 31	at No. 3 Idaho	Kibbie Dome; Moscow, ID	L 14–53		
November 7	Weber State	Walkup Skydome; Flagstaff, AZ	L 19–25	5,302	
November 14	Minnesota–Duluth*	Walkup Skydome; Flagstaff, AZ	W 31–22	5,489	
*Non-conference game; Rankings from NCAA Division I-AA Football Committee Poll released prior to the game
