= 1992 North Texas Mean Green football team =

American college football season

1992 North Texas Mean Green football
- Conference: Southland Conference
- Record: 4–7 (3–4 Southland)
- Head coach: Dennis Parker (2nd season)
- Home stadium: Fouts Field

1992 Southland Conference football standings
	Conf.					Overall
Team	W		L		T	W		L		T
No. 1 Northeast Louisiana $^	7	–	0	–	0	10	–	3	–	0
No. 11 McNeese State ^	6	–	1	–	0	9	–	4	–	0
Northwestern State	4	–	3	–	0	7	–	4	–	0
Sam Houston State	3	–	2	–	2	6	–	3	–	2
North Texas	3	–	4	–	0	4	–	7	–	0
Southwest Texas State	2	–	4	–	1	5	–	5	–	1
Stephen F. Austin	1	–	6	–	0	3	–	8	–	0
Nicholls State	0	–	6	–	1	1	–	9	–	1
$ – Conference champion; ^ – NCAA Division I-AA playoff participant; Rankings from NCAA Division I-AA Football Committee poll

The 1992 North Texas Mean Green football team was an American football team that represented the University of North Texas during the 1992 NCAA Division I-AA football season as a member of the Southland Conference. In their second year under head coach Dennis Parker, the team compiled a 4–7 record.

== Schedule ==
Date	Opponent	Site	Result	Attendance	Source
September 5	Abilene Christian*	Fouts Field; Denton, TX	W 41–0	10,129	
September 12	at SMU*	Ownby Stadium; University Park, TX (rivalry)	L 14–28	10,200	
September 19	at No. 17 Southwest Missouri State*	Robert W. Plaster Stadium; Springfield, MO	L 10–35	12,475	
September 26	at Texas*	Texas Memorial Stadium; Austin, TX	L 15–33	61,864	
October 10	Northwestern State^{†}	Fouts Field; Denton, TX	L 34–37	13,250	
October 17	at Stephen F. Austin	Homer Bryce Stadium; Nacogdoches, TX	W 21–11	7,165	
October 24	at Sam Houston State	Bowers Stadium; Huntsville, TX	L 14–34	6,134	
October 31	McNeese State	Fouts Field; Denton, TX	L 25–26	5,129	
November 7	Nicholls State	Fouts Field; Denton, TX	W 31–3	2,760	
November 14	at Southwest Texas State	Bobcat Stadium; San Marcos, TX	W 13–10	5,872	
November 21	No. 1 Northeast Louisiana	Fouts Field; Denton, TX	L 25–47	3,460	
*Non-conference game; ^{†}Homecoming; Rankings from NCAA Division I-AA Football Committee Poll released prior to the game
