= 1992 Northeast Louisiana Indians football team =

American college football season

1992 Northeast Louisiana Indians football

Southland champion

NCAA Division I-AA Quarterfinal, L 18–41 vs. Delaware
- Conference: Southland Conference
- Record: 10–3 (7–0 Southland)
- Head coach: Dave Roberts (4th season)
- Offensive coordinator: Norman Joseph (3rd season)
- Home stadium: Malone Stadium

1992 Southland Conference football standings
	Conf.					Overall
Team	W		L		T	W		L		T
No. 1 Northeast Louisiana $^	7	–	0	–	0	10	–	3	–	0
No. 11 McNeese State ^	6	–	1	–	0	9	–	4	–	0
Northwestern State	4	–	3	–	0	7	–	4	–	0
Sam Houston State	3	–	2	–	2	6	–	3	–	2
North Texas	3	–	4	–	0	4	–	7	–	0
Southwest Texas State	2	–	4	–	1	5	–	5	–	1
Stephen F. Austin	1	–	6	–	0	3	–	8	–	0
Nicholls State	0	–	6	–	1	1	–	9	–	1
$ – Conference champion; ^ – NCAA Division I-AA playoff participant; Rankings from NCAA Division I-AA Football Committee poll

The 1992 Northeast Louisiana Indians football team was an American football team that represented Northeast Louisiana University (now known as the University of Louisiana at Monroe) as part of the Southland Conference during the 1992 NCAA Division I-AA football season. In their fourth year under head coach Dave Roberts, the team compiled a 10–3 record. The Indians offense scored 466 points while the defense allowed 278 points.

== Schedule ==
Date	Time	Opponent	Rank	Site	TV	Result	Attendance	Source
September 5	7:00 pm	at Nicholls State		John L. Guidry Stadium; Thibodaux, LA		W 38–10		
September 12	7:00 pm	at Southwestern Louisiana*	No. 7	Cajun Field; Lafayette, LA (rivalry)		L 23–31	23,742	
September 19	7:00 pm	at No. 5 Eastern Kentucky*	No. 10	Roy Kidd Stadium; Richmond, KY		L 21–26		
September 26	7:00 pm	No. 16 Southwest Texas State	No. 12	Malone Stadium; Monroe, LA		W 13–6		
October 3	7:00 pm	Delta State*	No. 9	Malone Stadium; Monroe, LA		W 52–13		
October 10	7:00 pm	at No. 13 McNeese State	No. 9	Cowboy Stadium; Lake Charles, LA	HSE	W 38–10	19,376	
October 17	7:00 pm	Sam Houston State^{†}	No. 8	Malone Stadium; Monroe, LA		W 28–18	20,180	
October 24	2:00 pm	at Northwestern State	No. 5	Harry Turpin Stadium; Natchitoches, LA		W 28–18		
November 7	7:00 pm	No. 18 Eastern Washington*	No. 3	Malone Stadium; Monroe, LA		W 41–31		
November 14	7:00 pm	Stephen F. Austin	No. 1	Malone Stadium; Monroe, LA		W 41–22	17,132	
November 21	2:00 pm	at North Texas	No. 2	Fouts Field; Denton, TX		W 47–25	3,460	
November 28	6:00 pm	No. 18 Alcorn State*	No. 2	Malone Stadium; Monroe, LA (NCAA Division I-AA First Round)		W 78–27		
December 5	6:00 pm	No. 8 Delaware*	No. 2	Malone Stadium; Monroe, LA (NCAA Division I-AA Quarterfinal)		L 18–41	10,172	
*Non-conference game; ^{†}Homecoming; Rankings from NCAA Division I-AA Football Committee Poll released prior to the game; All times are in Central time
