= 1992 Boise State Broncos football team =

American college football season

1992 Boise State Broncos football
- Conference: Big Sky Conference
- Record: 5–6 (3–4 Big Sky)
- Head coach: Skip Hall (6th season)
- Defensive coordinator: Jim Fleming (3rd season)
- Home stadium: Bronco Stadium

1992 Big Sky Conference football standings
	Conf.					Overall
Team	W		L		T	W		L		T
No. 5 Idaho +^	6	–	1	–	0	9	–	3	–	0
No. 14 Eastern Washington +^	6	–	1	–	0	7	–	4	–	0
Montana	4	–	3	–	0	6	–	5	–	0
Weber State	4	–	3	–	0	6	–	5	–	0
Boise State	3	–	4	–	0	5	–	6	–	0
Montana State	2	–	5	–	0	4	–	7	–	0
Northern Arizona	2	–	5	–	0	4	–	7	–	0
Idaho State	1	–	6	–	0	3	–	8	–	0
+ – Conference co-champions; ^ – NCAA Division I-AA playoff participant; Rankings from NCAA Division I-AA Football Committee poll

The 1992 Boise State Broncos football team represented Boise State University in the 1992 NCAA Division I-AA football season. The Broncos competed in the Big Sky Conference and played their home games at Bronco Stadium in Boise, Idaho. Led by sixth-year head coach Skip Hall, Boise State finished the season 5–6 overall and 3–4 in conference.

Hall resigned following BSU's eleventh consecutive loss to rival Idaho, and he became the defensive coordinator at Missouri.

== Schedule ==
Date	Time	Opponent	Rank	Site	TV	Result	Attendance	Source
September 5		Chattanooga*		Bronco Stadium; Boise, ID		L 20–35	18,194	
September 12		at Idaho State		Holt Arena; Pocatello, ID		L 20–24	10,498	
September 19		Pacific (CA)*		Bronco Stadium; Boise, ID		W 17–7	17,132	
September 26	6:00 pm	at Stephen F. Austin*		Homer Bryce Stadium; Nacogdoches, TX		W 24–20	12,145	
October 3	6:05 pm	Montana		Bronco Stadium; Boise, ID		W 27–21	19,732	
October 10		at Northern Arizona		Walkup Skydome; Flagstaff, AZ		W 20–14	12,937	
October 17	6:05 pm	Weber State^{†}	No. 19	Bronco Stadium; Boise, ID		W 24–21	19,179	
October 24		Portland State*	No. 16	Bronco Stadium; Boise, ID		L 26–51	18,098	
October 31	12:05 pm	at Montana State		Reno H. Sales Stadium; Bozeman, MT		L 13–17	5,827	
November 14	1:35 pm	at No. 20 Eastern Washington		Woodward Field; Cheney, WA		L 13–14	4,218	
November 21	12:05 pm	No. 5 Idaho		Bronco Stadium; Boise, ID (rivalry)	Prime	L 16–62	22,472	
*Non-conference game; ^{†}Homecoming; Rankings from NCAA Division I-AA Football Committee Poll released prior to the game; All times are in Mountain time
