= 1992 Stephen F. Austin Lumberjacks football team =

American college football season

1992 Stephen F. Austin Lumberjacks football
- Conference: Southland Conference
- Record: 3–8 (1–6 Southland)
- Head coach: John Pearce (1st season)
- Home stadium: Homer Bryce Stadium

1992 Southland Conference football standings
	Conf.					Overall
Team	W		L		T	W		L		T
No. 1 Northeast Louisiana $^	7	–	0	–	0	10	–	3	–	0
No. 11 McNeese State ^	6	–	1	–	0	9	–	4	–	0
Northwestern State	4	–	3	–	0	7	–	4	–	0
Sam Houston State	3	–	2	–	2	6	–	3	–	2
North Texas	3	–	4	–	0	4	–	7	–	0
Southwest Texas State	2	–	4	–	1	5	–	5	–	1
Stephen F. Austin	1	–	6	–	0	3	–	8	–	0
Nicholls State	0	–	6	–	1	1	–	9	–	1
$ – Conference champion; ^ – NCAA Division I-AA playoff participant; Rankings from NCAA Division I-AA Football Committee poll

The 1992 Stephen F. Austin Lumberjacks football team was an American football team that represented Stephen F. Austin State University as a member of the Southland Conference during the 1992 NCAA Division I-AA football season. In their first year under head coach John Pearce, the team compiled an overall record of 3–8, with a mark of 1–6 in conference play, and finished seventh in the Southland.

== Schedule ==
Date	Opponent	Site	Result	Attendance	Source
September 5	Arkansas–Monticello*	Homer Bryce Stadium; Nacogdoches, TX	W 24–6		
September 12	at Montana State*	Reno H. Sales Stadium; Bozeman, MT	L 6–13	7,607	
September 19	Jackson State*	Homer Bryce Stadium; Nacogdoches, TX	W 41–25	8,645	
September 26	Boise State*	Homer Bryce Stadium; Nacogdoches, TX	L 20–24	12,145	
October 10	at No. 18 Southwest Texas State	Bobcat Stadium; San Marcos, TX	L 14–17	8,239	
October 17	North Texas	Homer Bryce Stadium; Nacogdoches, TX	L 11–21	7,165	
October 24	Nicholls State	Homer Bryce Stadium; Nacogdoches, TX	W 21–6		
October 31	at Sam Houston State	Bowers Stadium; Huntsville, TX (rivalry)	L 23–34	10,134	
November 7	No. 14 McNeese State	Homer Bryce Stadium; Nacogdoches, TX	L 3–28	11,479	
November 14	at No. 1 Northeast Louisiana	Malone Stadium; Monroe, LA	L 22–41	17,132	
November 21	Northwestern State	Homer Bryce Stadium; Nacogdoches, TX (rivalry)	L 10–24		
*Non-conference game; Rankings from NCAA Division I-AA Football Committee Poll released prior to the game
