= 1992 Eastern Washington Eagles football team =

American college football season

1992 Eastern Washington Eagles football

Big Sky co-champion

NCAA Division I-AA First Round, L 14–17 at Northern Iowa
- Conference: Big Sky Conference
- Record: 7–4 (6–1 Big Sky)
- Head coach: Dick Zornes (14th season)
- Home stadium: Woodward Field

1992 Big Sky Conference football standings
	Conf.					Overall
Team	W		L		T	W		L		T
No. 5 Idaho +^	6	–	1	–	0	9	–	3	–	0
No. 14 Eastern Washington +^	6	–	1	–	0	7	–	4	–	0
Montana	4	–	3	–	0	6	–	5	–	0
Weber State	4	–	3	–	0	6	–	5	–	0
Boise State	3	–	4	–	0	5	–	6	–	0
Montana State	2	–	5	–	0	4	–	7	–	0
Northern Arizona	2	–	5	–	0	4	–	7	–	0
Idaho State	1	–	6	–	0	3	–	8	–	0
+ – Conference co-champions; ^ – NCAA Division I-AA playoff participant; Rankings from NCAA Division I-AA Football Committee poll

The 1992 Eastern Washington Eagles football team represented Eastern Washington University as a member of the Big Sky Conference during the 1992 NCAA Division I-AA football season. Led by 14th-year head coach Dick Zornes, the Eagles compiled an overall record of 7–4, with a mark of 6–1 in conference play, and finished as Big Sky co-champion. Eastern Washington advanced to the NCAA Division I-AA First Round and were defeated by Northern Iowa.

== Schedule ==
Date	Time	Opponent	Rank	Site	Result	Attendance	Source
September 12		at Portland State*		Civic Stadium; Portland, OR	L 21–24		
September 19		No. 18 Sonoma State*		Woodward Field; Cheney, WA	W 45–14	4,013	
September 26		at No. 17 Montana		Washington–Grizzly Stadium; Missoula, MT (rivalry)	W 27–21	14,066	
October 3		Weber State	No. T–20	Woodward Field; Cheney, WA	W 32–14	3,338	
October 10		Montana State	No. 20	Woodward Field; Cheney, WA	W 23–17	4,712	
October 17		No. 3 Idaho	No. 16	Woodward Field; Cheney, WA	L 21–38	6,879	
October 24		at Northern Arizona	No. T–20	Walkup Skydome; Flagstaff, AZ	W 15–9	9,117	
October 31		at Idaho State	No. 19	Holt Arena; Pocatello, ID	W 37–3		
November 7		at No. 3 Northeast Louisiana*	No. 18	Malone Stadium; Monroe, LA	L 31–41		
November 14	12:35 p.m.	Boise State	No. 20	Woodward Field; Cheney, WA	W 14–13	4,218	
November 28		at No. 3 Northern Iowa*	No. 14	UNI-Dome; Cedar Falls, IA (NCAA Division I-AA First Round)	L 14–17	13,149	
*Non-conference game; Rankings from NCAA Division I-AA Football Committee Poll released prior to the game; All times are in Pacific time
