= John Pearce (American football) =

American football coach

Biographical details
- Born: January 13, 1947 (age 79); Sulphur Springs, Texas, U.S.
- Education: East Texas State (1970)

Coaching career (HC unless noted)
- 1970–1973: Waco Connally HS (TX) (DC)
- 1974: Kilgore HS (TX) (DC)
- 1975–1981: Allen HS (TX)
- 1982–1983: Sherman HS (TX)
- 1984–1988: Willowridge HS (TX)
- 1989–1991: Texas A&M (RB/TE)
- 1992–1998: Stephen F. Austin
- 1999–2002: UCLA (assistant)
- 2006: Rice (assistant)

Head coaching record
- Overall: 46–32–2 (college); 109–44–3 (high school)
- Tournaments: 2–2 (NCAA D-I-AA playoffs)

John Pearce (born January 13, 1947) is an American former football coach. He served as the head football coach at Stephen F. Austin State University in Nacogdoches, Texas from 1992 to 1998, compiling a record of 46–32–2. After leaving his position at Stephen F. Austin, he was an assistant coach at the University of California, Los Angeles (UCLA) and Rice University.

== High school and college ==
In his high school senior season of 1964 for the Sulphur Springs Wildcats, Pearce was an all-district and honorable mention all-state linebacker selection. In 2011, the Sulphur Springs New-Telegram celebrated 100 years of Wildcat football by picking the All-Century team for Sulphur Springs 1974 High School. Pearce was a member of that elite team as the best in Sulphur Springs football history and was honored as a player on the Wildcat Hall of Honor in 1996.

In 1965, Pearce received a football scholarship to Texas A&M University. He attended Texas A&M for two years, lettering on the freshman team, before transferring and finishing playing career at East Texas State University in 1968.

== Coaching career ==
=== High school ===
In his first coaching job, from 1970 through 1973, Pearce served as an assistant football coach at Waco Connally High School. Then, he served as the assistant football coach at Kilgore High School. For the next 14 years, Pearce was the head coach at Allen High School (1975–81), Sherman High School (1982-83) and Fort Bend Willowridge High School (1984–88).

At Allen High School, Pearce was the district coach of the year three-times and produced four state rank teams. In the 20th century, his winning percentage was the highest of any Allen coach, and in 1980, an 11-wins season was the most for any Allen 11-man football team. It was not until 2003 that an Allen team won more.

After two years at Sherman High School, as the Head Football Coach and Athletic Director, Pearce received the head football coach position at Ft. Bend Willowridge High School. Willowridge won four district championships, and Pearce received district coach of the year honors four times while producing four state top-ten teams. In 1988, he was the first ever winner of the Houston Touchdown Club High School Coach of the Year award. Mayor Kathy Whitmire named January 29, 1989, Coach John Pearce Day in Houston, and he received the Toyota Texas High School Coach of the Year in 1988. In 2006, Pearce was inducted into the T.J. Ford Willowridge Wall of Honor.

=== College ===
Pearce started his college coaching career in 1989 as an assistant at Texas A&M University where he coached the tight ends, punters, kickers, and running backs. Working under legendary coach R. C. Slocum, during his three years as a coach at A&M, the Aggies went to the Cotton Bowl, Holiday Bowl, and Sun Bowl and in 1991 won the Southwest Conference Championship. All three teams were nationally ranked each season.

In December 1991, Pearce received the head coaching job at Stephen F. Austin State University. The Lumberjacks, coached by Pearce, had a 46-32-2 record in seven seasons. After a rebuilding year in 1992, the next five years were record-setting. Of 118 1-AA universities, Pearce was the only head coach, in the official The Sports Network poll, to have his team ranked in the top 25 every week for five consecutive years (1993-1997). The Jacks were the only Southland Conference University during this time period to have five consecutive winning seasons. They also, from 1993 to 1997, were the only Division 1-A or 1-AA team in Texas to post winning seasons each year.

Before Pearce left SFA after the 1998 season, he had five nationally ranked teams, the best single season record in SFA history (1995), most SFA winning seasons in a row (5) and ranked in the top ten in the history of Southland Football coaches in total winning percentages. The Jacks also appeared in the NCAA play offs in 1993 and advanced to the national semi-finals in 1995.

He was selected by the American Football Coaches Association as a three year member of the All-American Selection Committee, and twice Chairman of the prestigious American Football Coaches Association Summer Manual. In 2016, he was inducted into the Stephen F. Austin University Letterman's Association Jacks of Honor.

In 1999, Pearce moved to the University of California, Los Angeles (UCLA) where he was an assistant coach for four seasons with three winning years and two bowl game appearances, the Sun Bowl and Las Vegas Bowl. After two years as a defensive coach, Pearce moved to coaching quarterbacks. As the quarterback coach, develop two of the three top passers in UCLA history. Pearce finished his coaching career on Christmas Day 2002 with a Las Vegas Bowl win over New Mexico.

After a short period at Rice University in 2006, where he served as the assistant head coach, Pearce started his writing career.

== Head coaching record ==
Year	Team	Overall	Conference	Standing	Bowl/playoffs	TSN^{#}
Stephen F. Austin Lumberjacks (Southland Conference / Southland Football League) (1992–1998)
1992	Stephen F. Austin	3–8	1–6	7th		
1993	Stephen F. Austin	8–4	5–2	3rd	L NCAA Division I-AA First Round	14
1994	Stephen F. Austin	6–3–2	4–1–1	3rd		21
1995	Stephen F. Austin	11–2	4–1	2nd	L NCAA Division I-AA Semifinal	5
1996	Stephen F. Austin	7–4	3–3	T–3rd		22
1997	Stephen F. Austin	8–3	5–2	3rd		13
1998	Stephen F. Austin	3–8	2–5	T–6th		
Stephen F. Austin:		46–32–2	24–20–1			
Total:		46–32–2				

== Authorship ==
In 2014, Pearce became a published author with his book "Ever Remember the Days of 1913-14". He also is an historical researcher on his family and author in many areas including a self-published book, Sulphur Springs football's "Pride of the Blue and Gold". Pearce has had numerous short stories published and has been called the official "Wildcat Historian" for Sulphur Springs High School football by the Sulphur Springs Daily News Telegram. His crowning authorship was a book titled "A Private in the Texas Army" following his Dad's war years experience published in 2022.

== Personal life ==
John married Jaime McKinney on June 29, 1968, and they had two children, Amy Elizabeth born in 1969 and Michael Frank born in 1973. Pearce has noted his most exciting time in coaching was having his record-setting son Mike Pearce on his SFA teams (1992–96) and watching him receive All-American recognition as a receiver in 1996.

Pearce retired to Sugar Land in 2003. After retirement, he and Jaime returned to Texas from California and built a home in Sugar Land. In retirement he had noted he wanted to be a "soccer mom" for his grandchildren.
