= 1992 Idaho Vandals football team =

American college football season

1992 Idaho Vandals football

Big Sky co-champion

NCAA Division I-AA First Round, L 20–23 vs. McNeese State
- Conference: Big Sky Conference
- Record: 9–3 (6–1 Big Sky)
- Head coach: John L. Smith (4th season)
- Offensive coordinator: Scott Linehan (1st season)
- Defensive coordinator: Craig Bray (3rd season)
- Home stadium: Kibbie Dome

1992 Big Sky Conference football standings
	Conf.					Overall
Team	W		L		T	W		L		T
No. 5 Idaho +^	6	–	1	–	0	9	–	3	–	0
No. 14 Eastern Washington +^	6	–	1	–	0	7	–	4	–	0
Montana	4	–	3	–	0	6	–	5	–	0
Weber State	4	–	3	–	0	6	–	5	–	0
Boise State	3	–	4	–	0	5	–	6	–	0
Montana State	2	–	5	–	0	4	–	7	–	0
Northern Arizona	2	–	5	–	0	4	–	7	–	0
Idaho State	1	–	6	–	0	3	–	8	–	0
+ – Conference co-champions; ^ – NCAA Division I-AA playoff participant; Rankings from NCAA Division I-AA Football Committee poll

The 1992 Idaho Vandals football team represented the University of Idaho in the 1992 NCAA Division I-AA football season. The Vandals, led by fourth-year head coach John L. Smith, were members of the Big Sky Conference and played their home games at the Kibbie Dome, an indoor facility on campus in Moscow, Idaho.

== Regular season ==
Led by junior quarterback Doug Nussmeier, Idaho finished the regular season at 9–2 and 6–1 in the Big Sky. The Vandals were co-champions with Eastern Washington, whom they defeated 38–21 in Cheney in mid-October. Idaho began the season at ninth in the I-AA rankings, and won its first six games, including a win at Division I-A Colorado State of the WAC. After the win at EWU, they climbed to second in the rankings.

Five days later, Idaho lost by one point at top-ranked Northern Iowa, then lost the Little Brown Stein at home to unranked Montana two weeks later. In the regular season finale with rival Boise State, the Vandals won for the eleventh consecutive year, 62–16, for their sixth straight victory at Bronco Stadium.

This is Idaho's most recent Big Sky football title. They moved up to Division I-A in 1996, but are scheduled to return to the conference for football in 2018.

== Division I-AA playoffs ==
After missing the postseason the previous year for the first time since 1984, the Vandals returned to the 16-team I-AA playoffs and were ranked fifth in the regular season's final poll. They hosted in the first round, but lost to #11 McNeese State of Louisiana.

== Notable players and coaches ==
Junior quarterback Nussmeier, a four-year starter (1990–93), was the conference offensive player of the year, an All-American, and won the Walter Payton Award in 1993. He was selected by the New Orleans Saints in the 1994 NFL draft and played several seasons as a reserve prior to starting his career as a coach. Also a four-year starter, senior defensive end Jeff Robinson was an All-American and a two-time Big Sky defensive player of the year. Selected by the Denver Broncos in the fourth round of the 1993 NFL draft, Robinson was later a tight end and played in the NFL through 2009, extending his career as a long snapper. He was a member of the St. Louis Rams for Super Bowls XXXIV and XXXVI. Junior placekicker Mike Hollis, a junior college transfer, had a seven-year career in the NFL, which included a Pro Bowl.

Former Vandal quarterback Scott Linehan, a future NFL head coach, was the offensive coordinator and two future Vandal head coaches were on the staff: Nick Holt (defensive line) and Paul Petrino (receivers).

With the win over Boise State, Smith became the winningest head coach in school history at 33–14, passing his former boss Dennis Erickson. He stayed another two seasons and remains the Vandals' all-time leader with 53 wins, followed by Erickson at 36 (an additional season in 2006), and Chris Tormey at 33.

== Schedule ==
Date	Time	Opponent	Rank	Site	TV	Result	Attendance	Source
September 5	6:05 pm	St. Cloud State*	No. 9	Kibbie Dome; Moscow, ID		W 42–9	7,750	
September 12	11:05 am	at Colorado State*	No. 9	Hughes Stadium; Fort Collins, CO		W 37–34	18,573	
September 19	1:05 pm	Weber State	No. 6	Kibbie Dome; Moscow, ID		W 52–24	11,400	
October 3	1:05 pm	Cal State Northridge*	No. 5	Kibbie Dome; Moscow, ID		W 30–7	6,700	
October 10	1:05 pm	Idaho State^{†}	No. 4	Kibbie Dome; Moscow, ID		W 49–18	14,500	
October 17	1:05 pm	at No. 16 Eastern Washington	No. 3	Woodward Field; Cheney, WA		W 38–21	6,879	
October 24	4:30 pm	at No. 1 Northern Iowa*	No. 2	UNI-Dome; Cedar Falls, IA	KHQ	L 26–27	16,324	
October 31	1:05 pm	Northern Arizona	No. 3	Kibbie Dome; Moscow, ID		W 53–14		
November 7	11:05 am	at Montana	No. 2	Washington–Grizzly Stadium; Missoula, MT (Little Brown Stein)	PSN	L 29–47	10,331	
November 14	1:05 pm	Montana State	No. 6	Kibbie Dome; Moscow, ID		W 28–7	9,300	
November 21	11:05 am	at Boise State	No. 5	Bronco Stadium; Boise, ID (rivalry)	PSN	W 62–16	22,472	
November 28	1:05 pm	No. 11 McNeese State*	No. 5	Kibbie Dome; Moscow, ID (NCAA Division I-AA First Round)		L 20–23	6,000	
*Non-conference game; ^{†}Homecoming; Rankings from NCAA Division I-AA Football Committee Poll released prior to the game; All times are in Pacific time

== NFL draft ==
One Vandal senior was selected in the 1993 NFL draft, which was eight rounds (224 selections).

Player	Position	Round	Overall	Franchise
Jeff Robinson	DE	4th	98	Denver Broncos

One Vandal junior was selected in the following year's draft in 1994, which was seven rounds (222 selections).

Player	Position	Round	Overall	Franchise
Doug Nussmeier	QB	4th	116	New Orleans Saints
