= 1992 NCAA Division II football season =

American college football season

- Regular season: August – November 1992
- Playoffs: November 21 – December 12, 1992
- National Championship: Braly Municipal Stadium; Florence, AL
- Champion: Jacksonville State
- Harlon Hill Trophy: Ronald Moore, Pittsburg State

The 1992 NCAA Division II football season, part of college football in the United States organized by the National Collegiate Athletic Association at the Division II level, began in August 1992, and concluded with the NCAA Division II Football Championship on December 12, 1992, at Braly Municipal Stadium in Florence, Alabama, hosted by the University of North Alabama. The Jacksonville State Gamecocks defeated the Pittsburg State Gorillas, 17–13, to win their first Division II national title.

The Harlon Hill Trophy was awarded to Ronald Moore, running back from Pittsburg State.

== Conference and program changes ==
=== Conference changes ===
- Following the 1991 season, the Missouri Intercollegiate Athletic Association changed its name to the Mid-America Intercollegiate Athletics Association after further expanding into Kansas with Emporia State.
- The Rocky Mountain Athletic Conference transitioned to the NCAA from NAIA Division I. All eight members of the RMAC transitioned to Division II.

Team	1991 conference	1992 conference
Tennessee–Martin	Independent	Ohio Valley (I-AA)
UC Santa Barbara	D-II Independent	Dropped Program
West Texas State	Restored program	D-II Independent

== Conference standings ==
1992 Central Intercollegiate Athletic Association football standings
	Conf.					Overall
Team	W		L		T	W		L		T
No. 6 Hampton $^	5	–	0	–	1	9	–	2	–	1
Winston-Salem State	5	–	1	–	0	7	–	4	–	0
Fayetteville State	3	–	2	–	1	5	–	3	–	1
Virginia Union	3	–	2	–	1	3	–	5	–	1
Johnson C. Smith	3	–	3	–	0	5	–	5	–	0
Virginia State	3	–	3	–	0	3	–	7	–	0
Elizabeth City State	2	–	3	–	1	3	–	6	–	1
Livingstone	2	–	4	–	0	3	–	7	–	0
Norfolk State	2	–	4	–	0	3	–	7	–	0
North Carolina Central	2	–	4	–	0	3	–	8	–	0
Bowie State	1	–	5	–	0	1	–	10	–	0
$ – Conference champion; ^ – NCAA Division II playoff participant; Rankings from NCAA Division II Football Committee poll

1992 Gulf South Conference football standings
	Conf.					Overall
Team	W		L		T	W		L		T
No. 3 Jacksonville State $^	5	–	0	–	1	12	–	1	–	1
No. T–16 North Alabama	3	–	2	–	1	7	–	4	–	1
No. T–20 Valdosta State	3	–	2	–	1	5	–	4	–	1
Mississippi College	2	–	3	–	1	4	–	5	–	1
Livingston	2	–	4	–	0	5	–	4	–	0
West Georgia	2	–	4	–	0	5	–	6	–	0
Delta State	2	–	4	–	0	3	–	6	–	1
$ – Conference champion; ^ – NCAA Division II playoff participant; Rankings from NCAA Division II Football Committee poll

1992 Lone Star Conference football standings
	Conf.					Overall
Team	W		L		T	W		L		T
No. 4 Texas A&I $^	6	–	0	–	0	9	–	3	–	0
No. 14 East Texas State	5	–	1	–	0	8	–	3	–	0
Angelo State	3	–	3	–	0	5	–	5	–	0
Eastern New Mexico	3	–	3	–	0	5	–	5	–	0
Central Oklahoma	2	–	4	–	0	6	–	4	–	0
Abilene Christian	2	–	5	–	0	3	–	6	–	0
Cameron	0	–	6	–	0	1	–	9	–	0
$ – Conference champion; ^ – NCAA Division II playoff participant; Rankings from NCAA Division II Football Committee poll

1992 Mid-America Intercollegiate Athletics Association football standings
	Conf.					Overall
Team	W		L		T	W		L		T
No. 1 Pittsburg State $^	9	–	0	–	0	14	–	1	–	0
No. T–16 NE Missouri State ^	7	–	2	–	0	9	–	3	–	0
Emporia State	6	–	3	–	0	7	–	3	–	0
Central Missouri State	6	–	3	–	0	6	–	4	–	0
NW Missouri State	6	–	3	–	0	6	–	5	–	0
Missouri Western	4	–	5	–	0	5	–	6	–	0
Missouri Southern	3	–	6	–	0	4	–	6	–	0
Washburn	2	–	7	–	0	2	–	8	–	0
Southwest Baptist	1	–	8	–	0	2	–	8	–	0
Missouri–Rolla	1	–	8	–	0	2	–	9	–	0
$ – Conference champion; ^ – NCAA Division II playoff participant; Rankings from NCAA Division II Football Committee poll

1992 Midwest Intercollegiate Football Conference standings
	Conf.					Overall
Team	W		L		T	W		L		T
Hillsdale +	8	–	2	–	0	9	–	2	–	0
Ferris State +^	8	–	2	–	0	10	–	3	–	0
Butler +	8	–	2	–	0	8	–	2	–	0
Grand Valley State +	8	–	2	–	0	8	–	3	–	0
Ashland	7	–	3	–	0	8	–	3	–	0
Saginaw Valley State	6	–	4	–	0	7	–	4	–	0
Wayne State (MI)	3	–	7	–	0	4	–	7	–	0
Valparaiso	3	–	7	–	0	3	–	8	–	0
Indianapolis	1	–	8	–	1	1	–	8	–	1
Saint Joseph's (IN)	1	–	8	–	1	1	–	8	–	1
Northern Michigan	1	–	9	–	0	1	–	9	–	0
+ – Conference co-champions; ^ – NCAA Division II playoff participant

1992 North Central Conference football standings
	Conf.					Overall
Team	W		L		T	W		L		T
No. 2 North Dakota State $^	8	–	1	–	0	10	–	2	–	0
No. 13 North Dakota ^	6	–	2	–	1	6	–	4	–	1
Augustana (SD)	6	–	3	–	0	8	–	3	–	0
St. Cloud State	6	–	3	–	0	7	–	4	–	0
South Dakota State	5	–	4	–	0	6	–	4	–	0
Morningside	4	–	4	–	1	5	–	5	–	1
Mankato State	4	–	5	–	0	6	–	5	–	0
Northern Colorado	4	–	5	–	0	6	–	5	–	0
South Dakota	1	–	8	–	0	2	–	9	–	0
Nebraska–Omaha	0	–	9	–	0	2	–	9	–	0
$ – Conference champion; ^ – NCAA Division II playoff participant; Rankings from NCAA Division II Football Committee poll

1992 Northern California Athletic Conference football standings
	Conf.					Overall
Team	W		L		T	W		L		T
No. T–7 UC Davis $^	5	–	0	–	0	8	–	2	–	1
Sonoma State	3	–	2	–	0	7	–	3	–	0
Humboldt State	3	–	2	–	0	7	–	4	–	0
Cal State Hayward	3	–	2	–	0	5	–	5	–	0
San Francisco State	1	–	4	–	0	2	–	7	–	0
Chico State	0	–	5	–	0	1	–	9	–	0
$ – Conference champion; ^ – NCAA Division II playoff participant; Rankings from NCAA Division II Football Committee poll

1992 Northern Sun Intercollegiate Conference football standings
	Conf.					Overall
Team	W		L		T	W		L		T
No. 14 Northern State $	5	–	1	–	0	6	–	5	–	0
No. 13 Southwest State (MN)	4	–	1	–	1	6	–	3	–	1
Minnesota Duluth	4	–	1	–	1	5	–	5	–	1
Moorhead State	3	–	3	–	0	4	–	5	–	0
Bemidji State	2	–	4	–	0	2	–	8	–	0
Winona State	0	–	6	–	0	2	–	9	–	0
Minnesota Morris	1	–	5	–	0	2	–	9	–	0
$ – Conference champion; Rankings from NAIA Division I poll

1992 Pennsylvania State Athletic Conference football standings
	Conf.					Overall
Team	W		L		T	W		L		T
East Division
No. T–7 West Chester x^	6	–	0	–	0	9	–	2	–	0
No. 18 East Stroudsburg	5	–	1	–	0	8	–	2	–	1
Millersville	4	–	2	–	0	7	–	3	–	0
Mansfield	3	–	3	–	0	5	–	6	–	0
Kutztown	2	–	4	–	0	4	–	5	–	1
Bloomsburg	1	–	5	–	0	2	–	8	–	0
Cheyney	0	–	6	–	0	0	–	11	–	0
West Division
No. 12 IUP x	5	–	0	–	1	8	–	1	–	1
Slippery Rock	5	–	1	–	0	9	–	2	–	0
No. 15 Edinboro ^	4	–	1	–	1	8	–	2	–	1
Shippensburg	2	–	3	–	1	4	–	6	–	1
California (PA)	2	–	4	–	0	4	–	6	–	1
Lock Haven	1	–	4	–	1	3	–	7	–	1
Clarion	0	–	6	–	0	0	–	10	–	0
x – Division champion/co-champions; ^ – NCAA Division II playoff participant; Clarion forfeited wins over Bloomsburg, IUP, Slippery Rock, Shippensburg, California, and Lock Haven.; Rankings from NCAA Division II Football Committee poll

1992 Rocky Mountain Athletic Conference football standings
	Conf.					Overall
Team	W		L		T	W		L		T
No. T–7 Western State (CO) $^	7	–	0	–	0	9	–	2	–	0
Fort Hays State	6	–	1	–	0	6	–	5	–	0
Chadron State	5	–	2	–	0	7	–	3	–	0
New Mexico Highlands	4	–	3	–	0	7	–	3	–	1
Mesa State	3	–	4	–	0	3	–	8	–	0
Colorado Mines	2	–	5	–	0	4	–	6	–	0
Adams State	1	–	6	–	0	3	–	7	–	0
Fort Lewis	0	–	7	–	0	1	–	9	–	0
$ – Conference champion; ^ – NCAA Division II playoff participant; Rankings from NCAA Division II Football Committee poll

1992 Southern Intercollegiate Athletic Conference football standings
	Conf.					Overall
Team	W		L		T	W		L		T
No. 10 Fort Valley State $	6	–	1	–	0	7	–	4	–	0
Albany State	5	–	1	–	1	6	–	4	–	1
No. T–20 Savannah State ^	5	–	2	–	0	8	–	4	–	0
Morehouse	4	–	3	–	0	6	–	5	–	0
Clark Atlanta	3	–	4	–	0	3	–	7	–	0
Alabama A&M	3	–	4	–	0	3	–	8	–	0
Tuskegee	2	–	4	–	1	3	–	6	–	1
Morris Brown	2	–	5	–	0	4	–	6	–	0
Miles	0	–	6	–	0	0	–	10	–	0
$ – Conference champion; ^ – NCAA Division II playoff participant; Rankings from NCAA Division II Football Committee poll

1992 Western Football Conference standings
	Conf.					Overall
Team	W		L		T	W		L		T
No. 19 Portland State $^	3	–	1	–	0	9	–	4	–	0
No. 11 Sacramento State	3	–	2	–	0	7	–	3	–	0
Cal State Northridge	3	–	2	–	0	5	–	5	–	0
Southern Utah	2	–	3	–	0	6	–	5	–	0
Cal Poly	2	–	3	–	0	4	–	5	–	1
Santa Clara	1	–	3	–	0	4	–	6	–	0
$ – Conference champion; ^ – NCAA Division II playoff participant; Rankings from NCAA Division II Football Committee poll

1992 NCAA Division II independents football records
	Conf.			Overall
Team	W	L	T	W		L		T
No. 5 New Haven ^		–		12	–	1	–	0
Troy State		–		10	–	1	–	0
Michigan Tech		–		9	–	1	–	0
Southern Connecticut State		–		6	–	4	–	0
Saint Mary's		–		5	–	4	–	0
Wayne State (NE)		–		5	–	4	–	1
Wofford		–		6	–	5	–	0
American International		–		4	–	6	–	0
Kentucky State		–		4	–	7	–	0
Springfield		–		3	–	6	–	0
Central Connecticut		–		1	–	8	–	0
Lees–McRae		–		1	–	9	–	0
West Texas State		–		1	–	9	–	0
Northwood		–		0	–	9	–	0
^ – NCAA Division II playoff participant; Rankings from NCAA Division II Football Committee poll

== Conference summaries ==
Conference Champions

Central Intercollegiate Athletic Association – Hampton
Gulf South Conference – Jacksonville State
Lone Star Conference – Texas A&I
Mid-America Intercollegiate Athletics Association – Pittsburg State
Midwest Intercollegiate Football Conference – Butler, Ferris State, Grand Valley State, and Hillsdale
North Central Conference – North Dakota State
Northern California Athletic Conference – UC Davis
Northern Intercollegiate Conference – Northern State
Pennsylvania State Athletic Conference – West Chester (East), Indiana (PA) (West)
Rocky Mountain Athletic Conference – Western State (CO)
South Atlantic Conference – Gardner–Webb
Southern Intercollegiate Athletic Conference – Fort Valley State
Western Football Conference – Portland State

== Postseason ==
1992 NCAA Division II Football Championship
- Teams: 16
- Finals Site: Braly Municipal Stadium; Florence, AL
- Champion: Jacksonville State; (1st title, title game)
- Runner-up: Pittsburg State; (2nd title game)
- Semifinalists: New Haven; Portland State
- Winning coach: championship

The 1992 NCAA Division II Football Championship playoffs were the 20th single-elimination tournament to determine the national champion of men's NCAA Division II college football. The championship game was held at Braly Municipal Stadium in Florence, Alabama, for the seventh time.

=== Playoff bracket ===
First round Campus sites
Ferris State	19
Edinboro	15
New Haven	38
West Chester	26
Jacksonville State	41
Savannah State	16
North Alabama	33
Hampton	21
Texas A&I	22
Western State (CO)	13
Portland State	42
UC Davis	28
Pittsburg State	28
North Dakota	21
North Dakota State	42
Northeast Missouri State	7

Quarterfinals; Campus sites
Ferris State	13
New Haven	35
Jacksonville State	14
North Alabama	12
Portland State	35
Texas A&I	30
Pittsburg State	38*
North Dakota State	37

Semifinals; Campus sites
New Haven	35
Jacksonville State	46
Portland State	38
Pittsburg State	41

Championship; Braly Municipal Stadium; Florence, AL
Jacksonville State	17
Pittsburg State	13

== See also ==
- 1992 NCAA Division I-A football season
- 1992 NCAA Division I-AA football season
- 1992 NCAA Division III football season
- 1992 NAIA Division I football season
- 1992 NAIA Division II football season
