= 1992 Idaho State Bengals football team =

American college football season

1992 Idaho State Bengals football
- Conference: Big Sky Conference
- Record: 3–8 (1–6 Big Sky)
- Head coach: Brian McNeely (1st season)
- Offensive scheme: Pro-style
- Defensive coordinator: Kyle Whittingham (1st season)
- Base defense: 4–3
- Home stadium: Holt Arena

1992 Big Sky Conference football standings
	Conf.					Overall
Team	W		L		T	W		L		T
No. 5 Idaho +^	6	–	1	–	0	9	–	3	–	0
No. 14 Eastern Washington +^	6	–	1	–	0	7	–	4	–	0
Montana	4	–	3	–	0	6	–	5	–	0
Weber State	4	–	3	–	0	6	–	5	–	0
Boise State	3	–	4	–	0	5	–	6	–	0
Montana State	2	–	5	–	0	4	–	7	–	0
Northern Arizona	2	–	5	–	0	4	–	7	–	0
Idaho State	1	–	6	–	0	3	–	8	–	0
+ – Conference co-champions; ^ – NCAA Division I-AA playoff participant; Rankings from NCAA Division I-AA Football Committee poll

The 1992 Idaho State Bengals football team represented Idaho State University as a member of the Big Sky Conference during the 1992 NCAA Division I-AA football season. Led by first-year head coach Brian McNeely, the Bengals compiled an overall record of 3–8, with a mark of 1–6 in conference play, and finished eighth in the Big Sky.

== Schedule ==
Date	Opponent	Site	Result	Attendance	Source
September 5	Mesa State*	Holt Arena; Pocatello, ID	W 52–17	5,000	
September 12	Boise State	Holt Arena; Pocatello, ID	W 24–20	10,498	
September 19	at No. 4 Northern Iowa*	UNI-Dome; Cedar Falls, IA	L 11–49	11,722	
September 26	at Northern Arizona	Walkup Skydome; Flagstaff, AZ	L 12–27	8,016	
October 3	Central Washington*	Holt Arena; Pocatello, ID	W 38–26		
October 10	at No. 4 Idaho	Kibbie Dome; Moscow, ID (rivalry)	L 18–49	14,500	
October 17	at Montana State	Sales Stadium; Bozeman, MT	L 7–14	7,017	
October 24	at Weber State	Wildcat Stadium; Ogden, UT	L 11–27	7,891	
October 31	No. 19 Eastern Washington	Holt Arena; Pocatello, ID	L 3–37		
November 14	Southern Utah*	Holt Arena; Pocatello, ID	L 28–29		
November 21	Montana	Holt Arena; Pocatello, ID	L 14–21	5,023	
*Non-conference game; Rankings from NCAA Division I-AA Football Committee Poll released prior to the game
