= 1992 Sonoma State Cossacks football team =

American college football season

1992 Sonoma State Cossacks football
- Conference: Northern California Athletic Conference
- Record: 7–3 (3–2 NCAC)
- Head coach: Tim Walsh (4th season)
- Home stadium: Cossacks Stadium

1992 Northern California Athletic Conference football standings
	Conf.					Overall
Team	W		L		T	W		L		T
No. 7 UC Davis $^	5	–	0	–	0	8	–	2	–	1
Sonoma State	3	–	2	–	0	7	–	3	–	0
Humboldt State	3	–	2	–	0	7	–	4	–	0
Cal State Hayward	3	–	2	–	0	5	–	5	–	0
San Francisco State	1	–	4	–	0	2	–	7	–	0
Chico State	0	–	5	–	0	1	–	9	–	0
$ – Conference champion; ^ – NCAA Division II playoff participant; Rankings from NCAA Division II Football Committee poll

The 1992 Sonoma State Cossacks football team represented Sonoma State University as a member of the Northern California Athletic Conference (NCAC) during the 1992 NCAA Division II football season. Led by Tim Walsh in his fourth and final season as head coach, Sonoma State compiled an overall record of 7–3 with a mark of 3–2 in conference play, tying for second place in the NCAC. The team outscored its opponents 296 to 266 for the season. The Cossacks played home games at Cossacks Stadium (Note: Cossacks Stadium was renamed in 2002 to Seawolf Stadium when the University changed the name of the mascot to Seawolves.) in Rohnert Park, California.

Walsh finished his tenure at Sonoma State with an overall record of 27–14, for a .659 winning percentage. He was the most successful coach in the history of the Sonoma State Cossacks football program, with more wins and a higher winning percentage than any other coach.

== Schedule ==
Date	Opponent	Rank	Site	Result	Attendance	Source
September 12	at Santa Clara*		Buck Shaw Stadium; Santa Clara, CA	W 27–7	1,100	
September 19	at Eastern Washington*	No. 18	Woodward Field; Cheney, WA	L 14–45	4,013	
September 26	No. 6 Portland State*		Cossacks Stadium; Rohnert Park, CA	W 37–27	2,143	
October 3	at Cal Poly*	No. 16	Mustang Stadium; San Luis Obispo, CA	W 36–35	4,170	
October 10	at Saint Mary's*	No. 9	Saint Mary's Stadium; Moraga, CA	W 26–21	4,120	
October 17	at UC Davis	No. 7	Toomey Field; Davis, CA	L 38–41	7,800–8,000	
October 24	Cal State Hayward		Cossacks Stadium; Rohnert Park, CA	W 37–20	1,096–2,500	
October 31	Humboldt State		Cossacks Stadium; Rohnert Park, CA	L 7–19	921	
November 7	at Chico State		University Stadium; Chico, CA	W 41–23	1,443	
November 14	San Francisco State		Cossacks Stadium; Rohnert Park, CA	W 33–28	871	
*Non-conference game; Rankings from NCAA Division II Football Committee Poll released prior to the game
