= 1992 UC Davis Aggies football team =

American college football season

1992 UC Davis Aggies football

NCAC champion

NCAA Division II First Round, L 28–42 vs. Portland State
- Conference: Northern California Athletic Conference
- Record: 8–2–1 (5–0 NCAC)
- Head coach: Bob Foster (4th season)
- Home stadium: Toomey Field

1992 Northern California Athletic Conference football standings
	Conf.					Overall
Team	W		L		T	W		L		T
No. 7 UC Davis $^	5	–	0	–	0	8	–	2	–	1
Sonoma State	3	–	2	–	0	7	–	3	–	0
Humboldt State	3	–	2	–	0	7	–	4	–	0
Cal State Hayward	3	–	2	–	0	5	–	5	–	0
San Francisco State	1	–	4	–	0	2	–	7	–	0
Chico State	0	–	5	–	0	1	–	9	–	0
$ – Conference champion; ^ – NCAA Division II playoff participant; Rankings from NCAA Division II Football Committee poll

The 1992 UC Davis football team represented the University of California, Davis as a member of the Northern California Athletic Conference (NCAC) during the 1992 NCAA Division II football season. Led Bob Foster in his fourth and final season as head coach, UC Davis compiled an overall record of 8–2–1 with a mark of 5–0 in conference play, winning the NCAC title for the 21st time in 22 season. 1992 was the 23rd consecutive winning season for the Aggies. UC Davis advanced to the NCAA Division II Football Championship playoffs, where they lost to Portland State in the first round. The team outscored its opponents 395 to 320 for the season. The Aggies played home games at Toomey Field in Davis, California.

This was the last season UC Davis competed in the NCAC. In 1993, they moved to the American West Conference (AWC).

== Schedule ==
Date	Time	Opponent	Rank	Site	Result	Attendance	Source
September 12		at Cal State Northridge*		North Campus Stadium; Northridge, CA	L 14–16	3,417	
September 19		at Santa Clara*		Buck Shaw Stadium; Santa Clara, CA	W 48–44	6.372	
September 26		Saint Mary's*		Toomey Field; Davis, CA	W 30–26	7,200	
October 3		at No. 9 Sacramento State*		Charles C. Hughes Stadium; Sacramento, CA (Causeway Classic)	W 21–14	15,800	
October 10		Cal Poly*		Toomey Field; Davis, CA (rivalry)	T 31–31	5,500	
October 17		No. 7 Sonoma State		Toomey Field; Davis, CA	W 41–38	7,800–8,000	
October 24		at Humboldt State	No. 13	Redwood Bowl; Arcata, CA	W 58–31	4,272	
October 31		Chico State	No. 15	Toomey Field; Davis, CA	W 44–37	4,050	
November 7		at San Francisco State	No. 11	Cox Stadium; San Francisco, CA	W 42–14	3,038	
November 14		at Cal State Hayward	No. T–7	Pioneer Stadium; Hayward, CA	W 38–27	6,000–7,000	
November 21	1:00 p.m.	at No. 19 Portland State	No. T–7	Civic Stadium; Portland, OR (NCAA Division II First Round)	L 28–42	7,336	
*Non-conference game; Rankings from NCAA Division II Football Committee Poll released prior to the game; All times are in Pacific time
