= 1992 Sacramento State Hornets football team =

American college football season

1992 Sacramento State Hornets football
- Conference: Western Football Conference
- Record: 7–3 (3–2 WFC)
- Head coach: Bob Mattos (15th season)
- Home stadium: Hornet Stadium

1992 Western Football Conference standings
	Conf.					Overall
Team	W		L		T	W		L		T
No. 19 Portland State $^	3	–	1	–	0	9	–	4	–	0
No. 11 Sacramento State	3	–	2	–	0	7	–	3	–	0
Cal State Northridge	3	–	2	–	0	5	–	5	–	0
Southern Utah	2	–	3	–	0	6	–	5	–	0
Cal Poly	2	–	3	–	0	4	–	5	–	1
Santa Clara	1	–	3	–	0	4	–	6	–	0
$ – Conference champion; ^ – NCAA Division II playoff participant; Rankings from NCAA Division II Football Committee poll

The 1992 Sacramento State Hornets football team represented California State University, Sacramento as a member of the Western Football Conference (WFC) during the 1992 NCAA Division II football season. Led by Bob Mattos in his 15th and final season as head coach, Sacramento State compiled an overall record of 7–3 with a mark of 3–2 in conference play, tying for second place in the WFC. The team outscored its opponents 268 to 149 for the season. The Hornets played home games at Hornet Stadium in Sacramento, California.

== Schedule ==
Date	Opponent	Rank	Site	Result	Attendance	Source
September 5	Montana State*		Hornet Stadium; Sacramento, CA	W 10–7	4,652–6,136	
September 19	Abilene Christian*	No. 19	Hornet Stadium; Sacramento, CA	W 57–9	3,186–3,545	
September 26	at Cal State Fullerton*	No. 12	Titan Stadium; Fullerton, CA	W 29–3	4,154	
October 3	UC Davis*	No. 9	Charles C. Hughes Stadium; Sacramento, CA (Causeway Classic)	L 14–21	15,800	
October 10	Chico State*		Hornet Stadium; Sacramento, CA	W 36–20	4,697–5,591	
October 17	at Cal Poly		Mustang Stadium; San Luis Obispo, CA	W 24–0	6,484	
October 24	at Southern Utah	No. 18	Eccles Coliseum; Cedar City, UT	L 14–17	2,345	
October 31	No. 9 Portland State		Hornet Stadium; Sacramento, CA	W 35–28	1,350	
November 7	Santa Clara	No. 13	Hornet Stadium; Sacramento, CA	W 32–21	2,727	
November 14	at Cal State Northridge	No. 11	North Campus Stadium; Northridge, CA	L 17–23	2,633	
*Non-conference game; Rankings from NCAA Division II Football Committee Poll released prior to the game

== Team players in the NFL ==
The following Sacramento State players were selected in the 1993 NFL draft.

Player	Position	Round	Overall	NFL team
Jon Kirksey	Defensive tackle	8	221	New Orleans Saints
