= 1992 North Dakota State Bison football team =

American college football season

1992 North Dakota State Bison football

NCC champion

NCAA Division II Quarterfinal, L 37–38 vs. Pittsburg State
- Conference: North Central Conference
- Record: 10–2 (8–1 NCC)
- Head coach: Rocky Hager (6th season)
- Home stadium: Dacotah Field

1992 North Central Conference football standings
	Conf.					Overall
Team	W		L		T	W		L		T
No. 2 North Dakota State $^	8	–	1	–	0	10	–	2	–	0
No. 13 North Dakota ^	6	–	2	–	1	6	–	4	–	1
Augustana (SD)	6	–	3	–	0	8	–	3	–	0
St. Cloud State	6	–	3	–	0	7	–	4	–	0
South Dakota State	5	–	4	–	0	6	–	4	–	0
Morningside	4	–	4	–	1	5	–	5	–	1
Mankato State	4	–	5	–	0	6	–	5	–	0
Northern Colorado	4	–	5	–	0	6	–	5	–	0
South Dakota	1	–	8	–	0	2	–	9	–	0
Nebraska–Omaha	0	–	9	–	0	2	–	9	–	0
$ – Conference champion; ^ – NCAA Division II playoff participant; Rankings from NCAA Division II Football Committee poll

The 1992 North Dakota State Bison football team was an American football team that represented North Dakota State University during the 1992 NCAA Division II football season as a member of the North Central Conference. In their sixth year under head coach Rocky Hager, the team compiled a 10–2 record and finished as NCC champion.

== Schedule ==
Date	Opponent	Rank	Site	Result	Attendance	Source
September 12	Cal Poly*	No. 8	Dacotah Field; Fargo, ND	W 26–10	13,211	
September 19	at Augustana (SD)	No. 7	Howard Wood Field; Sioux Falls, SD	W 21–17	3,800	
September 26	South Dakota State	No. 4	Dacotah Field; Fargo, ND (rivalry)	W 47–10	12,672	
October 3	at South Dakota	No. 4	DakotaDome; Vermillion, SD	W 39–20	2,900	
October 10	St. Cloud State	No. 3	Dacotah Field; Fargo, ND	L 21–23	13,637	
October 17	at No. 10 Mankato State	No. 14	Blakeslee Stadium; Mankato, MN	W 28–10	5,675	
October 24	Northern Colorado	No. 8	Dacotah Field; Fargo, ND	W 35–3	11,217	
October 31	at Nebraska–Omaha	No. 5	Al F. Caniglia Field; Omaha, NE	W 50–16	750	
November 7	Morningside	No. 2	Dacotah Field; Fargo, ND	W 24–7	8,389	
November 14	at No. 13 North Dakota	No. 2	Memorial Stadium; Grand Forks, ND (Nickel Trophy)	W 20–19	12,322	
November 21	No. 16 Northeast Missouri State*	No. 2	Dacotah Field; Fargo, ND (NCAA Division II First Round)	W 42–7	6,230	
November 28	at No. 1 Pittsburg State*	No. 2	Carnie Smith Stadium; Pittsburg, KS (NCAA Division II Quarterfinal)	L 37–38 ^{OT}	5,200	
*Non-conference game; Rankings from NCAA Division II Football Committee Poll released prior to the game
