= 1992 Sam Houston State Bearkats football team =

American college football season

1992 Sam Houston State Bearkats football
- Conference: Southland Conference
- Record: 6–3–2 (3–2–2 Southland)
- Head coach: Ron Randleman (11th season)
- Defensive coordinator: Mike Lucas (3rd season)
- Home stadium: Bowers Stadium

1992 Southland Conference football standings
	Conf.					Overall
Team	W		L		T	W		L		T
No. 1 Northeast Louisiana $^	7	–	0	–	0	10	–	3	–	0
No. 11 McNeese State ^	6	–	1	–	0	9	–	4	–	0
Northwestern State	4	–	3	–	0	7	–	4	–	0
Sam Houston State	3	–	2	–	2	6	–	3	–	2
North Texas	3	–	4	–	0	4	–	7	–	0
Southwest Texas State	2	–	4	–	1	5	–	5	–	1
Stephen F. Austin	1	–	6	–	0	3	–	8	–	0
Nicholls State	0	–	6	–	1	1	–	9	–	1
$ – Conference champion; ^ – NCAA Division I-AA playoff participant; Rankings from NCAA Division I-AA Football Committee poll

The 1992 Sam Houston State Bearkats football team represented Sam Houston State University as a member of the Southland Conference during the 1992 NCAA Division I-AA football season. Led by 11th-year head coach Ron Randleman, the Bearkats compiled an overall record of 6–3–2 with a mark of 3–2–2 in conference play, and finished fourth in the Southland.

== Schedule ==
Date	Opponent	Site	Result	Attendance	Source
September 12	Western Illinois*	Bowers Stadium; Huntsville, TX	W 19–14		
September 19	Angelo State*	Bowers Stadium; Huntsville, TX	W 20–0	12,020	
September 26	at Rice*	Rice Stadium; Houston, TX	L 14–45	21,500	
October 3	Alcorn State*	Bowers Stadium; Huntsville, TX	W 28–27		
October 10	at Nicholls State	John L. Guidry Stadium; Thibodaux, LA	T 19–19	4,207	
October 17	at No. 8 Northeast Louisiana	Malone Stadium; Monroe, LA	L 18–28	20,180	
October 24	North Texas	Bowers Stadium; Huntsville, TX	W 34–14	6,134	
October 31	Stephen F. Austin	Bowers Stadium; Huntsville, TX (Battle of the Piney Woods)	W 34–23	10,134	
November 7	at No. 8 Northwestern State	Harry Turpin Stadium; Natchitoches, LA	W 42–19		
November 14	at No. 13 McNeese State	Cowboy Stadium; Lake Charles, LA	L 14–37		
November 21	Southwest Texas State	Bowers Stadium; Huntsville, TX (rivalry)	T 22–22		
*Non-conference game; Rankings from NCAA Division I-AA Football Committee Poll released prior to the game
