= 1992 Montana Grizzlies football team =

American college football season

1992 Montana Grizzlies football
- Conference: Big Sky Conference
- Record: 6–5 (4–3 Big Sky)
- Head coach: Don Read (7th season)
- Offensive coordinator: Mick Dennehy (2nd season)
- Defensive coordinator: Jerome Souers (3rd season)
- Home stadium: Washington–Grizzly Stadium

1992 Big Sky Conference football standings
	Conf.					Overall
Team	W		L		T	W		L		T
No. 5 Idaho +^	6	–	1	–	0	9	–	3	–	0
No. 14 Eastern Washington +^	6	–	1	–	0	7	–	4	–	0
Montana	4	–	3	–	0	6	–	5	–	0
Weber State	4	–	3	–	0	6	–	5	–	0
Boise State	3	–	4	–	0	5	–	6	–	0
Montana State	2	–	5	–	0	4	–	7	–	0
Northern Arizona	2	–	5	–	0	4	–	7	–	0
Idaho State	1	–	6	–	0	3	–	8	–	0
+ – Conference co-champions; ^ – NCAA Division I-AA playoff participant; Rankings from NCAA Division I-AA Football Committee poll

The 1992 Montana Grizzlies football team was an American football team that represented the University of Montana in the Big Sky Conference during the 1992 NCAA Division I-AA football season. In their seventh year under head coach Don Read, the team compiled a 6–5 record.

== Schedule ==
Date	Opponent	Rank	Site	Result	Attendance	Source
September 5	at Washington State*		Martin Stadium; Pullman, WA	L 13–25	21,068	
September 12	Chico State*	No. 19	Washington–Grizzly Stadium; Missoula, MT	W 41–0	11,294	
September 19	at Kansas State*	No. 16	KSU Stadium; Manhattan, KS	L 12–27	32,712	
September 26	Eastern Washington	No. 17	Washington–Grizzly Stadium; Missoula, MT (rivalry)	L 21–27	14,066	
October 3	at Boise State		Bronco Stadium; Boise, ID	L 21–27	19,732	
October 10	at Weber State		Wildcat Stadium; Ogden, UT	L 7–24	9,036	
October 17	Northern Arizona		Washington–Grizzly Stadium; Missoula, MT	W 28–27	10,073	
October 24	Montana State		Washington–Grizzly Stadium; Missoula, MT (rivalry)	W 29–17	15,438	
November 7	No. 2 Idaho		Washington–Grizzly Stadium; Missoula, MT	W 47–29	10,331	
November 14	Hofstra*		Washington–Grizzly Stadium; Missoula, MT	W 50–6	8,274	
November 21	at Idaho State		Holt Arena; Pocatello, ID	W 21–14	5,023	
*Non-conference game; Rankings from NCAA Division I-AA Football Committee Poll released prior to the game
