= 1992 Weber State Wildcats football team =

American college football season

1992 Weber State Wildcats football
- Conference: Big Sky Conference
- Record: 6–5 (4–3 Big Sky)
- Head coach: Dave Arslanian (4th season)
- Home stadium: Wildcat Stadium

1992 Big Sky Conference football standings
	Conf.					Overall
Team	W		L		T	W		L		T
No. 5 Idaho +^	6	–	1	–	0	9	–	3	–	0
No. 14 Eastern Washington +^	6	–	1	–	0	7	–	4	–	0
Montana	4	–	3	–	0	6	–	5	–	0
Weber State	4	–	3	–	0	6	–	5	–	0
Boise State	3	–	4	–	0	5	–	6	–	0
Montana State	2	–	5	–	0	4	–	7	–	0
Northern Arizona	2	–	5	–	0	4	–	7	–	0
Idaho State	1	–	6	–	0	3	–	8	–	0
+ – Conference co-champions; ^ – NCAA Division I-AA playoff participant; Rankings from NCAA Division I-AA Football Committee poll

The 1992 Weber State Wildcats football team represented Weber State University as a member of the Big Sky Conference during the 1992 NCAA Division I-AA football season. Led by fourth-year head coach Dave Arslanian and senior quarterback Jamie Martin, the Wildcats compiled an overall record of 6–5 with a mark of 4–3 in conference play, tying for third place in the Big Sky. In 2014, Martin's number 10 was the first number be retired in Stewart Stadium. As of 2019, Martin is the only Weber State player to receive this honor.

== Schedule ==
Date	Opponent	Site	Result	Attendance	Source
September 5	at New Mexico State*	Aggie Memorial Stadium; Las Cruces, NM	L 21–37	14,216	
September 12	Southern Utah*	Wildcat Stadium; Ogden, UT	W 35–24	13,153	
September 19	at No. 6 Idaho	Kibbie Dome; Moscow, ID	L 24–52	11,400	
September 26	Montana State	Wildcat Stadium; Ogden, UT	W 47–19	6,134	
October 3	at No. T–20 Eastern Washington	Woodward Field; Cheney, WA	L 14–32	3,338	
October 10	Montana^{†}	Wildcat Stadium; Ogden, UT	W 24–7	9,036	
October 17	at Boise State	Bronco Stadium; Boise, ID	L 21–24	19,179	
October 24	Idaho State	Wildcat Stadium; Ogden, UT	W 27–11	7,891	
October 31	at Nevada*	Mackay Stadium; Reno, NV	W 23–21	19,333	
November 7	at Northern Arizona	Walkup Skydome; Flagstaff, AZ	W 25–19	5,302	
November 21	No. 11 McNeese State	Wildcat Stadium; Ogden, UT	L 22–23	4,972	
*Non-conference game; ^{†}Homecoming; Rankings from NCAA Division I-AA Football Committee Poll released prior to the game

== Roster ==
1992 Weber State Wildcats football team roster
Players
Coaches
Offense

Pos.	#	Name	Class
G	66	Miller Atagi	Jr
WR	82	Nate Burchette	Jr
OT	70	Aaron Elliott	Sr
G	62	Paul Kongaika	Jr
TE	89	Wade Lindley	Jr
QB	10	Jamie Martin	Sr
OT	72	Ken Rayner	Jr
RB	40	Derrick Richards	Sr
WR	4	Fred Safford	Jr
WR	22	Trevor Shaw	Jr
C	53	Les Vierra	Jr

Defense

Pos.	#	Name	Class
LB	35	Jantz Afuvai	Jr
CB	1	Derrick Beatty	So
FS	3	Joe Delfin	So
LB	37	Deric Gurley	Jr
CB	26	Mark Hood	Jr
DT	73	Steve Filiaga	Jr
DE	91	James Fundark	Sr
DT	94	Jason Jensen	Fr
CB	8	Shay Liggins	Sr
SS	7	Lamar Mickey	Jr
DE	87	Tim Otten	Jr
DT	--	Tau Pupua	So

Special teams

Pos.	#	Name	Class
P	12	Roy Hudson
PK	15	Patrik Schmidle

Head coach

- Dave Arslanian

Coordinators/assistant coaches

Legend

- (C) Team captain
- (S) Suspended
- (I) Ineligible
- Injured
- Redshirt

== Team players in the NFL ==
No Weber State players were selected in the 1993 NFL draft.

The following finished their college career in 1992, were not drafted, but played in the NFL.

Player	Position	First NFL team
Jamie Martin	Quarterback	Los Angeles Rams
