= 1992 Southwest Texas State Bobcats football team =

American college football season

1992 Southwest Texas State Bobcats football
- Conference: Southland Conference
- Record: 5–5–1 (2–4–1 SLC)
- Head coach: Jim Bob Helduser (1st season)
- Defensive coordinator: Jack Kiser (1st season)
- Home stadium: Bobcat Stadium

1992 Southland Conference football standings
	Conf.					Overall
Team	W		L		T	W		L		T
No. 1 Northeast Louisiana $^	7	–	0	–	0	10	–	3	–	0
No. 11 McNeese State ^	6	–	1	–	0	9	–	4	–	0
Northwestern State	4	–	3	–	0	7	–	4	–	0
Sam Houston State	3	–	2	–	2	6	–	3	–	2
North Texas	3	–	4	–	0	4	–	7	–	0
Southwest Texas State	2	–	4	–	1	5	–	5	–	1
Stephen F. Austin	1	–	6	–	0	3	–	8	–	0
Nicholls State	0	–	6	–	1	1	–	9	–	1
$ – Conference champion; ^ – NCAA Division I-AA playoff participant; Rankings from NCAA Division I-AA Football Committee poll

The 1992 Southwest Texas State Bobcats football team was an American football team that represented Southwest Texas State University (now known as Texas State University) during the 1992 NCAA Division I-AA football season as a member of the Southland Conference (SLC). In their first year under head coach Jim Bob Helduser, the team compiled an overall record of 5–5–1 with a mark of 2–4–1 in conference play.

== Schedule ==
Date	Opponent	Rank	Site	Result	Attendance	Source
September 5	at Texas A&I*		Javelina Stadium; Kingsville, TX	W 15–14		
September 12	vs. Texas Southern*		Alamo Stadium; San Antonio, TX	W 39–34		
September 19	No. 1 Youngstown State*	No. 20	Bobcat Stadium; San Marcos, TX	L 20–23	11,217	
September 26	at No. 12 Northeast Louisiana	No. 16	Malone Stadium; Monroe, LA	L 6–13		
October 3	Nicholls State	No. 16	Bobcat Stadium; San Marcos, TX (rivalry)	W 38–13		
October 10	Stephen F. Austin	No. 18	Bobcat Stadium; San Marcos, TX	W 17–14	8,239	
October 24	McNeese State	No. 12	Bobcat Stadium; San Marcos, TX	L 13–17		
October 31	at Northwestern State		Harry Turpin Stadium; Natchitoches, LA	L 17–20		
November 7	at Prairie View A&M*		Edward L. Blackshear Field; Prairie View, TX	W 56–7		
November 14	North Texas		Bobcat Stadium; San Marcos, TX	L 10–13	5,872	
November 21	at Sam Houston State		Bowers Stadium; Huntsville, TX (rivalry)	T 22–22		
*Non-conference game; Rankings from NCAA Division I-AA Football Committee Poll released prior to the game
