= 1992 Montana State Bobcats football team =

American college football season

1992 Montana State Bobcats football
- Conference: Big Sky Conference
- Record: 4–7 (2–5 Big Sky)
- Head coach: Cliff Hysell (1st season)
- Home stadium: Sales Stadium

1992 Big Sky Conference football standings
	Conf.					Overall
Team	W		L		T	W		L		T
No. 5 Idaho +^	6	–	1	–	0	9	–	3	–	0
No. 14 Eastern Washington +^	6	–	1	–	0	7	–	4	–	0
Montana	4	–	3	–	0	6	–	5	–	0
Weber State	4	–	3	–	0	6	–	5	–	0
Boise State	3	–	4	–	0	5	–	6	–	0
Montana State	2	–	5	–	0	4	–	7	–	0
Northern Arizona	2	–	5	–	0	4	–	7	–	0
Idaho State	1	–	6	–	0	3	–	8	–	0
+ – Conference co-champions; ^ – NCAA Division I-AA playoff participant; Rankings from NCAA Division I-AA Football Committee poll

The 1992 Montana State Bobcats football team was an American football team that represented Montana State University in the Big Sky Conference (Big Sky) during the 1992 NCAA Division I-AA football season. In their first season under head coach Cliff Hysell, the Bobcats compiled a 4–7 record (3–5 against Big Sky opponents) and finished fifth out of nine teams in the Big Sky.

== Schedule ==
Date	Opponent	Site	Result	Attendance	Source
September 5	at Sacramento State*	Hornet Stadium; Sacramento, CA	L 7–10	4,652–6,136	
September 12	Stephen F. Austin*	Sales Stadium; Bozeman, MT	W 13–10	7,607	
September 19	Mesa State*	Sales Stadium; Bozeman, MT	W 43–0	7,247	
September 26	at Weber State	Wildcat Stadium; Ogden, UT	L 19–47	6,134	
October 3	Northern Arizona^{†}	Sales Stadium; Bozeman, MT	L 9–13	9,787	
October 10	at No. 20 Eastern Washington	Woodward Field; Cheney, WA	L 17–23	4,712	
October 17	Idaho State	Sales Stadium; Bozeman, MT	W 14–7	7,017	
October 24	at Montana	Washington–Grizzly Stadium; Missoula, MT (rivalry)	L 17–29	15,438	
October 31	Boise State	Sales Stadium; Bozeman, MT	W 17–13	5,827	
November 14	at No. 6 Idaho	Kibbie Dome; Moscow, ID	L 7–28	9,300	
November 21	at UNLV*	Sam Boyd Silver Bowl; Whitney, NV	L 7–36	9,444	
*Non-conference game; ^{†}Homecoming; Rankings from NCAA Division I-AA Football Committee Poll released prior to the game
