= 1992 McNeese State Cowboys football team =

American college football season

1992 McNeese State Cowboys football

NCAA Division I-AA Quarterfinal, L 7–29 vs. Northern Iowa
- Conference: Southland Conference
- Record: 9–4 (6–1 Southland)
- Head coach: Bobby Keasler (3rd season)
- Offensive coordinator: Mike Santiago (3rd season)
- Defensive coordinator: Kirby Bruchhaus (3rd season)
- Home stadium: Cowboy Stadium

1992 Southland Conference football standings
	Conf.					Overall
Team	W		L		T	W		L		T
No. 1 Northeast Louisiana $^	7	–	0	–	0	10	–	3	–	0
No. 11 McNeese State ^	6	–	1	–	0	9	–	4	–	0
Northwestern State	4	–	3	–	0	7	–	4	–	0
Sam Houston State	3	–	2	–	2	6	–	3	–	2
North Texas	3	–	4	–	0	4	–	7	–	0
Southwest Texas State	2	–	4	–	1	5	–	5	–	1
Stephen F. Austin	1	–	6	–	0	3	–	8	–	0
Nicholls State	0	–	6	–	1	1	–	9	–	1
$ – Conference champion; ^ – NCAA Division I-AA playoff participant; Rankings from NCAA Division I-AA Football Committee poll

The 1992 McNeese State Cowboys football team was an American football team that represented McNeese State University as a member of the Southland Conference (Southland) during the 1992 NCAA Division I-AA football season. In their third year under head coach Bobby Keasler, the team compiled an overall record of 9–4, with a mark of 6–1 in conference play, and finished second in the Southland. The Cowboys advanced to the Division I-AA playoffs and lost to Northern Iowa in the quarterfinals.

== Schedule ==
Date	Time	Opponent	Rank	Site	Result	Attendance	Source
September 5		Southwest Missouri State*	No. 19	Cowboy Stadium; Lake Charles, LA	W 16–13	15,702	
September 12	7:00 p.m.	No. 3 Northern Iowa*	No. 10	Cowboy Stadium; Lake Charles, LA	L 18–21	17,765	
September 19		at Nevada*	No. 15	Mackay Stadium; Reno, NV	L 21–31	22,005	
September 26		at Nicholls State	No. 19	John L. Guidry Stadium; Thibodaux, LA	W 21–17		
October 10		Northeast Louisiana	No. 13	Cowboy Stadium; Lake Charles, LA	L 35–52		
October 17		Northwestern State		Cowboy Stadium; Lake Charles, LA (rivalry)	W 29–0		
October 24		at No. 12 Southwest Texas State		Bobcat Stadium; San Marcos, TX	W 17–13		
October 31		at North Texas	No. 15	Fouts Field; Denton, TX	W 26–25		
November 7		at Stephen F. Austin	No. 14	Homer Bryce Stadium; Nacogdoches, TX	W 28–3	11,479	
November 14		Sam Houston State	No. 13	Cowboy Stadium; Lake Charles, LA	W 37–14		
November 21		at Weber State*	No. 11	Wildcat Stadium; Ogden, UT	W 23–22	4,972	
November 28		at No. 5 Idaho*	No. 11	Kibbie Dome; Moscow, ID (NCAA Division I-AA First Round)	W 23–20	6,000	
December 5		at No. 3 Northern Iowa*	No. 11	UNI-Dome; Cedar Falls, IA (NCAA Division I-AA Quarterfinal)	L 20–23	13,375	
*Non-conference game; Rankings from NCAA Division I-AA Football Committee Poll released prior to the game; All times are in Central time
