= 1992 NCAA Division II football rankings =

The 1992 NCAA Division II football rankings are from the NCAA Division II football committee. This is for the 1992 season.

== Legend ==
	Increase in ranking
	Decrease in ranking
	Not ranked previous week
(#–#)	Win–loss record
(Italics)	Number of first place votes
т	Tied with team above or below also with this symbol

== NCAA Division II Football Committee poll ==
	Preseason	Week 1 Sept 15	Week 2 Sept 22	Week 3 Sept 29	Week 4 Oct 6	Week 5 Oct 13	Week 6 Oct 20	Week 7 Oct 27	Week 8 Nov 3	Week 9 Nov 10	
1.	Pittsburg State	Pittsburg State (2–0) (4)	Pittsburg State (3–0) (4)	Pittsburg State (4–0) (4)	Pittsburg State (5–0) (4)	Pittsburg State (6–0) (4)	Pittsburg State (7–0) (4)	Pittsburg State (8–0) (4)	Pittsburg State (9–0) (4)	Pittsburg State (10–0) (4)	1.
2.	Jacksonville State	IUP (2–0)	IUP (3–0)	IUP (3–0) т	IUP (4–0)	IUP (5–0)	IUP (6–0)	IUP (7–0)	North Dakota State (7–1)	North Dakota State (8–1)	2.
3.	Portland State	Jacksonville State (2–0) т	Jacksonville State (2–0)	Jacksonville State (3–0) т	North Dakota State (4–0)	Texas A&I (4–1)	Texas A&I (5–1)	Edinboro (7–0)	Jacksonville State (6–1–1)	Jacksonville State (7–1–1)	3.
4.	IUP	Portland State (1–0) т	North Dakota State (2–0) т	North Dakota State (3–0)	Texas A&I (3–1)	Jacksonville State (4–0–1)	Jacksonville State (5–0–1)	Jacksonville State (5–1–1) т	Texas A&I (6–2)	Texas A&I (7–2)	4.
5.	Northern Colorado	Northern Colorado (2–0)	Texas A&I (2–1) т	Texas A&I (2–1)	Jacksonville State (3–0–1)	Edinboro (5–0)	Edinboro (6–0)	North Dakota State (6–1) т	New Haven (8–0)	New Haven (9–0)	5.
6.	Angelo State	Angelo State (2–0)	Portland State (2–1)	Edinboro (3–0)	Edinboro (4–0)	New Haven (5–0)	New Haven (6–0)	Texas A&I (5–2) т	IUP (7–1)	Hampton (8–1–1)	6.
7.	Mississippi College	North Dakota State (1–0)	Edinboro (3–0)	Mankato State (4–0)	New Haven (5–0)	Sonoma State (4–1)	Hampton (6–0–1)	New Haven (7–0)	Hampton (7–1–1) т	UC Davis (7–1–1) т	7.
8.	North Dakota State	Texas A&I (1–1)	Mankato State (3–0)	Savannah State (4–0)	Savannah State (4–1)	Hampton (5–0–1)	North Dakota State (5–1)	Hillsdale (8–0)	Western State (CO) (8–1) т	West Chester (8–1) т	8.
9.	Texas A&I	Northeast Missouri State (2–0)	Savannah State (3–0) т	Sacramento State (3–0)	Sonoma State (3–1)	St. Cloud State (4–2)	Hillsdale (7–0)	Augustana (SD) (7–1) т	Savannah State (7–2)	Western State (CO) (8–1) т	9.
10.	Grand Valley State	Butler (2–0)	Northeast Missouri State (3–0) т	Hampton (3–0–1) т	Hampton (4–0–1)	Mankato State (5–1)	Portland State (4–2) т	Portland State (5–2) т	West Chester (7–1)	Fort Valley State (7–3)	10.
11.	Wofford	Hampton (2–0)	North Alabama (3–0)	New Haven (4–0) т	Mankato State (4–1)	Hillsdale (6–0)	Augustana (SD) (6–1) т	Winston–Salem State (6–2)	UC Davis (6–1–1)	Sacramento State (7–2)	11.
12.	Butler	Edinboro (2–0)	Sacramento State (2–0)	Emporia State (4–0)	Hillsdale (5–0)	Grand Valley State (5–1)	Emporia State (6–1)	Emporia State (7–1)	Fort Valley State (6–3)	IUP (7–1–1)	12.
13.	Northeast Missouri State	New Haven (2–0)	New Haven (3–0)	Livingston (3–0)	Grand Valley State (4–1) т	Portland State (4–2)	UC Davis (5–0–1)	Hampton (6–1–1) т	Sacramento State (6–2)	North Dakota (6–2–1)	13.
14.	Sacramento State	Mankato State (2–0)	Angelo State (2–1)	Hillsdale (4–0) т	Winston–Salem State (4–1) т	North Dakota State (5–1)	Winston–Salem State (5–2) т	Western State (CO) (7–1) т	East Texas State (6–3)	East Texas State (7–3)	14.
15.	East Texas State	Savannah State (2–0)	Ashland (3–0)	Central Oklahoma (3–0) т	East Texas State (3–2)	North Alabama (4–1)	East Texas State (4–3) т	UC Davis (5–1–1)	Hillsdale (8–1)	Edinboro (7–1–1)	15.
16.	Edinboro	Ashland (2–0)	Livingston (3–0)	Sonoma State (2–1)	Portland State (3–2) т	Emporia State (5–1)	Savannah State (5–2)	Savannah State (6–2)	Emporia State (7–2)	Northeast Missouri State (8–2) т	16.
17.	North Dakota	North Alabama (2–0)	East Texas State (2–1)	Northern Colorado (3–1)	Emporia State (4–1) т	Augustana (SD) (5–1)	West Chester (5–1)	West Chester (6–1)	Edinboro (7–1)	North Alabama (6–3) т	17.
18.	Virginia Union	Sonoma State (2–0)	Emporia State (3–0)	Grand Valley State (3–1)	Augustana (SD) (3–1)	East Texas State (3–3)	Mankato State (5–2) т	East Texas State (5–3)	Augustana (SD) (7–2)	East Stroudsburg (8–1)	18.
19.	Ashland	Sacramento State (1–0)	Hampton (2–0–1) т	Winston–Salem State (3–1)	North Alabama (3–1)	Millersville (5–0) т	Sacramento State (5–1) т	Fort Valley State (5–2) т	North Dakota (5–2–1)	Portland State (6–3)	19.
20.	Winston–Salem State	Nebraska–Omaha (1–0)	Hillsdale (3–0) т	Western State (CO) (4–0)	Millersville (4–1) т	Savannah State (4–2) т	North Alabama (4–2)	North Dakota (4–2–1) т	North Alabama (5–3)	Valdosta State (5–4) т	20.
21.					Central Oklahoma (4–1) т	Winston–Salem State (4–2) т				Savannah State (7–3) т	21.
	Preseason	Week 1 Sept 15	Week 2 Sept 22	Week 3 Sept 29	Week 4 Oct 6	Week 5 Oct 13	Week 6 Oct 20	Week 7 Oct 27	Week 8 Nov 3	Week 9 Nov 10	
		Dropped: 7 Mississippi College; 10 Grand Valley State; 11 Wofford; 15 East Texas State; 17 North Dakota; 18 Virginia Union; 20 Winston–Salem State	Dropped: 5 Northern Colorado; 10 Butler; 18 Sonoma State; 20 Nebraska–Omaha	Dropped: 6 Portland State; 10 Northeast Missouri State; 11 North Alabama; 14 Angelo State; 15 Ashland; 17 East Texas State	Dropped: 9 Sacramento State; 13 Livingston; 17 Northern Colorado; 20 Western State (CO)	Dropped: 20 Central Oklahoma	Dropped: 7 Sonoma State; 9 St. Cloud State; 12 Grand Valley State; 19 Millersville	Dropped: 18 Mankato State; 19 Sacramento State; 20 North Alabama	Dropped: 10 Portland State; 11 Winston–Salem State	Dropped: 15 Hillsdale; 16 Emporia State; 18 Augustana (SD)	
